= List of inactive United States Navy aircraft squadrons (VF) =

163 of the 185 United States Navy aircraft squadrons which have carried a VF designation at some point during their existence have been disestablished. Two squadrons exist in an "inactive" status for possible future reactivation and Twenty are currently active designated as Strike Fighter Squadrons (VFA).

These disestablished and deactivated squadrons are sometimes incorrectly referred to as decommissioned squadrons, but the U.S. Navy does not "commission" or "decommission" aircraft squadrons. Until 1998, squadrons were "established", "disestablished", and sometimes "redesignated"; since 1998, squadrons are "established", "deactivated", and sometimes "reactivated" and/or "redesignated". It has never been correct to refer to U.S. Navy aircraft squadrons as being commissioned and decommissioned, ships are commissioned and decommissioned, U.S. Navy aircraft squadrons are not.

Under the system in use until 1998, a squadron's history and lineage began when it was established and ended when it was disestablished. During the course of its existence (between establishment and disestablishment) a squadron could be redesignated multiple times. The Navy's oldest currently active aircraft squadron is VFA-14 "Tophatters". It was established in September 1919 and has carried sixteen different designations (VT-5, VP-1-4, VF-4, VB-3, VS-41, VA-14, VF-14, VFA-14 to name just a few) having been redesignated fifteen times. Re-designation might assign a squadron a new number while leaving the basic designation untouched (e.g., VF-151 to VF-192), or it could change the entire designation (e.g., VA-156 to VF-111). A Squadron retains its lineage regardless of its redesignation(s). When a squadron was disestablished or redesignated its former designation became available to be used for a new squadron or in the redesignation of an existing squadron. Squadrons which share a designation do not also share a lineage as a squadron's lineage follows the squadron, not the designation. A squadron which received the designation of a former squadron might adopt the nickname and/or the insignia and carry on the traditions of the previous squadron, but it could not lay claim to the history or lineage of that previous squadron any more than a new ship commissioned with the name USS Enterprise could claim to be the actual WWII aircraft carrier USS Enterprise.

This system changed in March 1998 with Chief of Naval Operations Instruction (OPNAVINST) 5030.4E. U.S. Navy aircraft squadrons are now no longer disestablished, they are instead "deactivated." A deactivated squadron remains in existence, though only "on paper", awaiting possible future "reactivation". Neither its designation nor any previous designations are available for use by a new squadron. A reactivated squadron would trace its lineage back to the squadron's original establishment date, including its inactive period. Under this new system a squadron can still be redesignated if its function changes necessitating a different designation, for example Fighter Squadron TWO (VF-2) redesignated to Strike Fighter Squadron TWO (VFA-2).

The current update of OPNAVINST 3050.4 contains a list of all currently active and deactivated U.S. Navy aircraft squadrons.

This article lists all 185 squadrons which have ever been designated with the VF designation with every designation each ever existed under, including the twenty currently active squadrons. It does not include U.S. Navy Reserve squadrons which existed before 1970 unless they were activated in which case they are included, nor does it include 25 "VF(N)" (night fighter) squadrons which existed between 1943 and 1946.

== VF squadron designation systems ==
The VF designation was one of the oldest in use by the U.S. Navy. Beginning in the early 1920s it designated "Combat Squadron" then "Fighting Plane Squadron". Later, up to 1948 it designated "Fighting Squadron" and from 1948 on it designated "Fighter Squadron" until 2006 when the last fighter squadron flying the F-14D Tomcat transitioned to the F/A-18F Super Hornet and was redesignated a Strike Fighter Squadron (VFA). The designation has not been used since 2006.

Before 1937 squadrons were numbered either serially (VF-1, VF-2, VF-3 etc...) or by ship squadron numbers, but beginning in 1937 squadron numbers were determined by the hull number of the aircraft carrier to which they were assigned. From 1941 to 1964 they were determined by Carrier Air Group (Carrier Air Wing after 20 December 1963) assignment. The specific number was determined by the designation scheme in effect during different time periods, and the various designation systems used through the years resulted in the same squadron designations being re used for completely unrelated squadrons. The designations VF-11, VF-12 and VF-13 can be used for an example: The first use of each of those designations denoted a single VF squadron of each of three different CVGs during WWII with VF-11 being the VF squadron of CVG-11, VF-12 the VF squadron of CVG-12, and VF-13 the VF squadron of CVG-13. The second use of those designations denoted three VF squadrons of a single CVG after 1 September 1948 with VF-11, VF-12 and VF-13 being the 1st, 2nd and 3rd VF squadrons of CVG-1.

VF Squadron numbering was determined by seven different designation schemes which existed from 1920 through 1964.

=== Combat squadron designations 15 June 1920 to 1 July 1922 ===
When the Navy first established squadrons they were designated by a combination of squadron function and a number. Functions such as "Combat", "Torpedo" or "Patrol" were followed by a number which was determined by the ship squadron number to which the aircraft squadron was attached. The official use of abbreviated designations such as VT, VP or VF however was not implemented until 1922. The Dictionary of American Naval Aviation Squadrons (DANAS) Volume 1 Appendix 4 lists the abbreviated designations and lists the abbreviation VF as applying to "Combat Squadron" in 1922.

=== Fighting plane squadron designations 1 July 1922 to 1 July 1927 ===
Naval Aviation Organization for FY 1923 issued on 17 June 1922 and implemented on 1 July 1922 changed the numbering of squadrons from according to ship squadron number to serially within each type of squadron and listed the squadrons by abbreviated designation (VF, VO, VS, VT) for the first time. On 1 July 1922 the two Combat Squadrons were redesignated in accordance with this scheme becoming Fighting Plane Squadrons VF-1 and VF-2 and a third squadron was established as VF-3.

=== Fighting squadron designations 1 July 1927 to 1 July 1937 ===
On 1 July 1927 the squadron designation scheme was modified to include a letter appended to the end of the squadron designation which denoted to which fleet the squadron was assigned, the squadrons remained numbered serially. At that time in history the Navy was organized into two fleets, one of them called the Battle Fleet and the other called the Scouting Fleet. In the squadron designation scheme the letter 'B' at the end of the squadron designation denoted a squadron of the Battle Fleet and the letter 'S' denoted one of the Scouting Fleet. When squadrons were moved between the Battle and Scouting Fleets they were redesignated with each move by changing the letter from 'B' to 'S' or 'S' to 'B'

=== Fighting squadron designations 1 July 1937 to 1 March 1942 ===
On 1 July 1937 the squadron designation scheme was changed when squadrons were permanently assigned to specific aircraft carriers. The Battle Fleet and Scouting Fleet suffix letters were eliminated and squadrons were redesignated to conform with the hull number of the aircraft carrier to which they were assigned with VF squadrons being designated VF-2 (USS Lexington CV 2), VF-3 (USS Saratoga CV 3), VF-4 (USS Ranger CV 4) etc... (USS Langley (CV 1) had ceased operating as an Aircraft Carrier by October 1936 having been converted to a Seaplane Tender so there was no squadron designated VF-1).

=== Fighting squadron designations 1 March 1942 to 15 November 1946 ===
As part of the Navy's massive wartime buildup, a new designation scheme was created which established numbered carrier air groups (CVG) and designated squadrons in accordance with carrier air group assignment. The seven ship named carrier air groups were not redesignated and they continued to exist alongside the new numbered air groups until by the end of 1942 Lexington, Yorktown, Wasp and Hornet Air Groups had been disestablished after their aircraft carriers were sunk and Enterprise Air Group had been disestablished when USS Enterprise entered a shipyard for extensive repair after being severely damaged. The two remaining ship named air groups, Ranger Air Group and Saratoga Air Group were later redesignated CVG-4 and CVG-3 on 3 August 1943 and 25 September 1943 respectively.

VF squadron designations were directly linked to and determined by Carrier Air Group (CVG) (later, Carrier Air Wing (CVW)) designations from 1942 to 1964. See List of United States Navy aircraft wings for detailed information regarding Carrier Air Group designations.

=== Fighting squadron designations 15 November 1946 to 1 September 1948 ===
After the post war drawdown a new designation scheme was implemented on 15 November 1946 which included the letters 'A', 'B', 'L' and 'E' in both the Carrier Air Group and Squadron designations. Suffix letters denoted the type of Carrier Air Group to which a Squadron was assigned; 'A' for those assigned to CVAGs aboard Essex class carriers (sometimes called "Attack" carriers), 'B' for those assigned to CVBGs aboard the large Midway class carriers (sometimes called "Battle" carriers), 'L' for those assigned to CVLGs sized for embarkation aboard "light" Independence or Saipan class carriers and 'E' for those assigned to CVEGs sized for the remaining small WWII "escort carriers".

=== Fighter squadron designations 1 September 1948 to September 1964 ===
The last designation scheme became effective on 1 September 1948 and squadrons began to be redesignated starting a few months in advance of the effective date. Squadron suffix letters were dropped and squadron designation numbers identified to which CVG the squadron was assigned with the first one or two digits denoting the CVG followed by a 1, 2 or 3 to differentiate between the VF squadrons in the air group (CVG-1: VF-11, VF-12, VF-13; CVG-15: VF-151, VF-152, VF-153 etc...). This designation scheme required the redesignation of squadrons each time a squadron was moved from one air group to another. It remained in effect until September 1964 when squadron designations were "frozen" and squadrons from that time forward kept whatever designation they had in September 1964.

== VF squadrons by establishment date ==
The 185 squadrons which have been designated a VF squadron for any period of their existence are listed below in order of establishment date divided into five time periods: Pre WWII from 1919 through 1941; WWII from 1942 through 1945; Post WWII from 1946 through 1949; 1950s from 1950 through 1959; and 1960 and later.

=== Pre-WWII: Squadrons established 1919 through 1941 ===
There were eleven squadrons established during this time period which carried the VF designation for some period during their existence. Two of these squadrons are still active today.

Note: The parenthetical (1st), (2nd), (3rd) etc... appended to some designations in the table below are not a part of the designation system. They are added to this table to indicate that the designation was used more than once during the history of U.S. Naval Aviation and which use of the designation is indicated. Absence indicates that the designation was used only once.

- "Tophatters"; U.S. Navy's oldest currently active aircraft squadron. Established September 1919, still active as VFA-14.

As this squadron has existed for the entire period covered by all seven squadron designation schemes, each scheme can be seen in the squadron's history below.

Designation	Insignia	Nickname	Aircraft (Note: Where not listed in a wikipedia article, aircraft assignment was derived from "http://www.wings-aviation.ch/25-Navy-Sqn/Squadron-Basis-en.htm")	Lineage	Notes (Note: Carrier assignment of early squadrons through 1937 were derived from "http://www.wings-aviation.ch")	Current Designation
Air Det Pac Flt		Top Hatters		Air Det Pac Flt: Sep 1919-15 Jun 1920		
15 June 1920 Designation Scheme (by ship squadron)		Top Hatters				
VT-5(1st)		Top Hatters		VT-5(1st): 15 Jun 1920-7 Sep 1921	Torpedo Squadron 5	
VP-1-4		Top Hatters		VP-1-4: 7 Dec 1921-23 Sep 1921	Patrol Squadron 1–4	
VF-4(1st). (Note: Dictionary of American Naval Aviation Squadrons (DANAS) Vol 1 App 4 lists squadron designations and lists the "VF" designation as the designation for "Combat Squadron" in 1922.)		Top Hatters	VE-7	VF-4(1st): 23 Sep 1921 – 1 Jul 1922	Combat Squadron 4 (Note: Dictionary of American Naval Aviation Squadrons (DANAS) Vol I chap 1 pg 9 references the "Navy Directory dated 1 January 1922" which listed two "combat squadrons"; Combat Squadron 3 and Combat Squadron 4 in existence as of the date of issuance (1 January 1922). DANAS Vol 1 App 4 lists squadron designations and lists the "VF" designation as the designation for "Combat Squadron" in 1922. It is possible that this VF-4 was the "Combat Squadron 4" listed in the Navy Directory dated 1 January 1922 and that the "Combat Squadron 4" listed in the squadron below was actually the "Combat Squadron 3 (VF-3)" listed in that Navy Directory.)	
1 July 1922 Designation Scheme (serially by type)		Top Hatters				
VF-1(1st)		Top Hatters	VE-7, TS-1	VF-1(1st): 1 Jul 1922-1 Jul 1927	Fighting Plane Squadron 1 (Note: Redesignated Fighting Squadron 1 in accordance with the change from designating squadrons by ship squadron to designating them serially (VF-1, VF-2, VF-3 etc...).) (Note: Provided fighters to Battle Ships.) (Note: Began operating aboard USS Langley (CV 1) in 1926)	
1 July 1927 Designation Scheme (serially by type with Fleet suffix)		Top Hatters				
VF-1B(1st)		Top Hatters	TS-1, FB5, F2B	VF-1B(1st): 1 Jul 1927-1 Jul 1934	Fighting Squadron 1 of the Battle Fleet (Note: Redesignated Fighting Squadron 1B with assignment to the "Battle Fleet." Operated from USS Langley (CV 1) and USS Saratoga (CV 3))	
VB-2B		Top Hatters	F4B, F11C	VB-2B(2nd): 1 Jul 1934-1 Jul 1937	Bombing Squadron 2 of the Battle Fleet (Note: Redesignated Bombing Squadron 2B of the "Battle Fleet" on 1 July 1934. Operated from USS Saratoga (CV 3))	
1 July 1937 Designation Scheme (by aircraft carrier hull number)		Top Hatters				
VB-3(1st)		Top Hatters	SBC, SB2U	VB-3: 1 Jul 1937-1 Jul 1939	Saratoga (CV 3) Bombing Squadron (Note: Redesignated Bombing Squadron 3 when suffix letters were discontinued and squadrons were designated in accordance with the aircraft carrier to which they were assigned)	
VB-4(2nd)		Top Hatters	SB2U, SBD	VB-4(1st): 1 Jul 1939-15 Mar 1941	Ranger (CV 4) Bombing Squadron	
VS-41(2nd)		Top Hatters	SBD	VS-41(2nd): 15 Mar 1941-1 Mar 1943	One of two Ranger (CV 4) Scouting Squadrons	
VB-41		Top Hatters	SBD	VB-41: 1 Mar 1943-4 Aug 1943	One of two Ranger (CV 4) Bombing Squadrons	
1 March 1942 Designation Scheme (by Carrier Air Group)		Top Hatters				
VB-4(4th)		Top Hatters	SBD, SB2C	VB-4(2nd): 4 Aug 1943-15 Nov 1946	Bombing Squadron of CVG-4 (Note: Redesignated Bombing Squadron 4 as the sole Bombing Squadron when Ranger Air Group was redesignated Carrier Air Group 4 (CVG-4) on 3 August 1943)	
15 November 1946 Designation Scheme (by Carrier Air Group with type suffix)		Top Hatters				
VA-1A		Top Hatters	SB2C, F4U	VA-1A: 15 Nov 1946-2 Aug 1948	One of two Attack Squadrons of CVAG-1 (Note: Redesignated Attack Squadron 1A as the first of two Attack Squadrons (the other was VA-2A) of Attack Carrier Air Group 1 (CVAG-1))	
1 September 1948 Designation Scheme (by Carrier Air Group until September 1964)		Top Hatters				
VA-14		Top Hatters	F4U	VA-14: 2 Aug 1948-15 Dec 1949	Fourth Fighter or Attack Squadron of CVG-1 (Note: Redesignated Attack Squadron 14 as a Carrier Air Group 1 (CVG-1) attack squadron. CVG-1 squadrons were VF-11, VF-12, VF-13, VA-14, VA-15)	
VF-14(2nd)		Top Hatters	F4U, F3D, F3H/F-3, F-4, F-14	VF-14(2nd): 15 Dec 1949-1 Dec 2001	Redesignated from a CVG-1 Attack Sqdn to a CVG-1 Fighter Sqdn (Note: Carrier Air Group 1 squadrons: VF-11, VF-12, VF-13, VF-14, VA-15, VA-16)	
VFA-14		Top Hatters	F/A-18E	VFA-14: 1 Dec 2001–present	Redesignated a Strike Fighter Squadron with replacement of the F-14 with the F/A-18E	VFA-14

- "Carrier Aviation's First Squadron;" original "Felix the Cat" squadron. Established 23 September 1921, disestablished 1 October 1945.

Fighting Two was the first squadron trained to operate as a squadron from USS Langley (CV 1). During the closing days of 1924 and early 1925, the planes of VF-2 were equipped for Carrier landing and takeoff and during the week ending 17 January 1925 the squadron became the first to qualify in carrier landings. Also, this squadron is the squadron which created the famous "Felix the Cat" insignia and is one of three squadrons which used the insignia simultaneously during WWII. The insignia was adopted while the squadron was a Bombing Squadron designated VB-2B from 1 Jul 1928-1 Jul 1930 and it continued to be used once the squadron was redesignated back to a VF squadron on 1 July 1930. By July 1937 the squadron had been redesignated VF-3(2nd) as USS Saratoga's (CV 3) fighting squadron. On 15 July 1943 CVG-6's VF-6 (2nd) was transferred to Saratoga Air Group and redesignated VF-3(3rd) and Saratoga Air Group's VF-3(2nd) (this squadron) was transferred to CVG-6 and redesignated VF-6(3rd). VF-3(3rd) laid claim to the Felix the Cat insignia, but VF-3(2nd) (this squadron, now VF-6(3rd)) also retained it when it moved to CVG-6; then on 1 Feb 1945 VF-3(3rd) was split in two with half the squadron remaining VF-3(3rd) and the other half being established as VBF-3 (Bombing Fighting Squadron 3). VBF-3 then became the third squadron using the insignia with all three using it until the original owner (this squadron) was disestablished after the war on 1 October 1945. VBF-3 was then redesignated VF-4A on 15 November 1946 and gave up the insignia leaving the "new" VF-3(3rd) which is the current day VFA-31 in sole possession of it.

Designation	Insignia	Nickname	Aircraft (Note: Where not listed in a wikipedia article, aircraft assignment was derived from "http://www.wings-aviation.ch/25-Navy-Sqn/Squadron-Basis-en.htm")	Lineage	Notes (Note: Carrier assignment of early squadrons through 1937 were derived from "http://www.wings-aviation.ch")	Disestablished
15 June 1920 Designation Scheme (by ship squadron)
Combat; Squadron; 4			VE-7	Cmbt Sqdn 4: 23 Sep 1921 – 1 Jul 1922	(Note: Dictionary of American Naval Aviation Squadrons (DANAS) Vol I chap 1 pg 9 references the "Navy Directory dated 1 January 1922" which listed two "combat squadrons"; Combat Squadron 3 and Combat Squadron 4 in existence as of the date of issuance (1 January 1922). DANAS Vol 1 App 4 lists squadron designations and lists the "VF" designation as the designation for "Combat Squadron" in 1922. It is possible that the squadron above (VF-4(1st)) was the "Combat Squadron 4" listed in the Navy Directory dated 1 January 1922 and that this "Combat Squadron 4" was actually the "Combat Squadron 3 (VF-3)" listed in that Navy Directory.)	
1 July 1922 Designation Scheme (serially by type)
VF-2(1st)			VE-7, F6C-2	VF-2(1st): 1 Jul 1922-19 Mar 1923	Fighting Plane Squadron 2 (Note: Redesignated Fighting Squadron 2 in accordance with the change from designating squadrons by ship squadron to designating them serially (VF-1, VF-2, VF-3 etc...).)	
VF-2B(1st)			FU-1, F6C-4	VF-2B(1st): 19 Mar 1923-1 Jan 1927	(Note: The "LINEAGE FOR FIGHTER SQUADRONS" list found on the U.S. Navy History and Heritage command website at lists this squadron as VF-2B; however, the designation scheme which appended suffix letters to denote "Battle Fleet" or "Scouting Fleet" assignment was not implemented until 1 July 1927, four years and three and a half months after this designation. Either that LINEAGE FOR FIGHTER SQUADRONS list is in error, or the squadron was actually designated as such years in advance of adoption of the scheme fleet wide. This squadron at this time was the first squadron ever to operate from USS Langley (CV 1) which was the U.S. Navy's first aircraft carrier and it is possible that it was designated with the suffix "B" in anticipation of its pending assignment to USS Langley) (Note: Provided fighters to Battle Ships) (Note: Beginning in 1925 operated from USS Langley (CV 1) as Carrier Aviation's first squadron)	
VF-6(1st)			FU-1	VF-6(1st): 1 Jan 1927-1 Jul 1927	Fighting Plane Squadron 6 (Note: Operated from USS Langley (CV 1) and provided fighters to Battle Ships)	
1 July 1927 Designation Scheme (serially by type with Fleet suffix)
VF-6B(1st)			FU-1	VF-6B(1st): 1 Jul 1927-1 Jul 1928	Fighting Squadron 6 of the Battle Fleet (Note: Redesignated Fighting Squadron 6B with assignment to the battle fleet)	
VB-2B(1st)			F2B, F3B	VB-2B(1st): 1 Jul 1928-1 Jul 1930	Bombing Squadron 2 of the Battle Fleet (Note: Converted to a Bombing Squadron and designated bombing squadron 2B) (Note: created the famous Felix the Cat insignia) (Note: Operated from USS Saratoga (CV 3))	
VF-6B(2nd)			F2B, F3B, F2F	VF-6B(2nd): 1 Jul 1930-1 Jul 1937	Fighting Squadron 6 of the Battle Fleet (Note: Converted back to a Fighting Squadron, continued operating from USS Saratoga (CV 3))	
1 July 1937 Designation Scheme (by aircraft carrier hull number)
VF-3(2nd)			F2F, F4F	VF-3(2nd): 1 Jul 1937-15 Jul 1943	Saratoga (CV 3) Fighting Squadron (Note: Redesignated Fighting Squadron 3 when suffix letters were discontinued and squadrons were designated in accordance with the aircraft carrier to which they were assigned, VF-3 designated USS Saratoga's (CV 3) Fighting Squadron)	
1 March 1942 Designation Scheme (by Carrier Air Group)
VF-6(3rd)			F4F, F6F	VF-6(3rd): 15 Jul 1943 – 1 Oct 1945	CVG-6 Fighting Squadron (Note: Transferred to Carrier Air Group 6 (CVG-6) and redesignated VF-6 (3rd). Disestablished 1 Oct 1945 as part of the post WWII draw down)	1 October 1945

- First VF-3. Established 1 July 1922, disestablished in May 1924.

Fighting Plane Squadron 3, the third VF squadron to be established. This squadron was a short lived squadron existing less than two years.

Designation	Insignia	Nickname	Aircraft (Note: Where not listed in a wikipedia article, aircraft assignment was derived from "http://www.wings-aviation.ch/25-Navy-Sqn/Squadron-Basis-en.htm")	Lineage	Notes	Disestablished
1 July 1922 Designation Scheme (serially by type)
VF-3(1st)				VF-3(1st): 1 Jul 1922-May 1924	Fighting Plane Squadron 3	May 1924

- "Flying Chiefs". Established 1 January 1927, disestablished 1 July 1942.

Established with a majority of enlisted pilots, most of them Chief Petty Officers. Was the Fighting Squadron of USS Lexington (CV 2) during the first months of WWII. Was disestablished after the loss of USS Lexington in the Battle of the Coral Sea.

Designation	Insignia	Nickname	Aircraft (Note: Where not listed in a wikipedia article, aircraft assignment was derived from "http://www.wings-aviation.ch/25-Navy-Sqn/Squadron-Basis-en.htm")	Lineage	Notes (Note: Carrier assignment of early squadrons through 1937 were derived from "http://www.wings-aviation.ch")	Disestablished
1 July 1922 Designation Scheme (serially by type)
VF-2(2nd)		Flying Chiefs (Note: Established with a majority of enlisted pilots, most of them Chief Petty Officers)	VE-7, F6C, FU-1	VF-2(2nd): 1 Jan 1927 – 1 Jul 1927	Fighting Plane Squadron 2 (Note: designated VF-2 when the first VF-2 was redesignated VF-6) (Note: Operated from USS Langley (CV 1))	
1 July 1927 Designation Scheme (serially by type with Fleet suffix)		Flying Chiefs				
VF-2B(2nd)		Flying Chiefs	F6C, F2B, F3B	VF-2B(2nd): 1 Jul 1927-1 Jul 1932	Fighting Squadron 2 of the Battle Fleet (Note: Redesignated Fighting Squadron 2B with assignment to the "Battle Fleet") (Note: Operated aboard USS Lexington (CV 2))	
VF-2S		Flying Chiefs	F3B	VF-2S: 1 Jul 1932-Apr 1933	Fighting Squadron 2 of the Scouting Fleet (Note: Redesignated Fighting Squadron 2S with assignment to the "Scouting Fleet," continued to operate from USS Lexington (CV 2))	
VF-2B(3rd)		Flying Chiefs	F3B	VF-2B(3rd): Apr 1933-1 Jul 1937	Fighting Squadron 2 of the Battle Fleet (Note: Rejoined the "Battle Fleet" still aboard USS Lexington (CV 2))	
1 July 1937 Designation Scheme (by aircraft carrier hull number)		Flying Chiefs				
VF-2(3rd)		Flying Chiefs	F2A, F4F	VF-2(3rd): 1 Jul 1937 – 1 Jul 1942	Lexington (CV 2) Fighting Squadron (Note: Redesignated Fighting Squadron 2 when suffix letters were discontinued and squadrons were designated in accordance with the aircraft carrier to which they were assigned, VF-2 designated USS Lexington's (CV 2) Fighting Squadron) (Note: Lexington Air Group along with this squadron were disestablished after the 8 May 1942 sinking of USS Lexington in the battle of the Coral Sea)	1 July 1942

- Original "Red Rippers" squadron. Established 1 February 1927, disestablished 15 February 1959.

Began WWII as one of two USS Ranger (CV 4) fighting squadrons. Because USS Ranger was a smaller carrier and lacked storage space required for torpedoes of a torpedo (VT) squadron it initially had a second scouting squadron in place of the torpedo squadron but by March 1941 it had two fighting squadrons designated VF-41 and VF-42 instead.

Designation	Insignia	Nickname	Aircraft (Note: Where not listed in a wikipedia article, aircraft assignment was derived from "http://www.wings-aviation.ch/25-Navy-Sqn/Squadron-Basis-en.htm")	Lineage	Notes (Note: Carrier assignment of early squadrons through 1937 were derived from "http://www.wings-aviation.ch")	Disestablished
1 July 1922 Designation Scheme (serially by type)
VF-5(1st)		(Note: Original "Red Rippers" squadron)Red Rippers	F6C-3	VF-5(1st): 1 Feb 1927 – 1 Jul 1927	Fighting Squadron 5	
1 July 1927 Designation Scheme (serially by type with Fleet suffix)		Red Rippers				
VF-5S(1st)		Red Rippers	F6C-3	VF-5S(1st): 1 Jul 1927-Jan 1928	Fighting Squadron 5 of the Scouting Fleet (Note: Redesignated Fighting Squadron 5S with assignment to the "Scouting Fleet")	
VF-5B(1st)		Red Rippers	F6C-3	VF-5B(1st): Jan 1928-1 Jul 1928	Fighting Squadron 5 of the Battle Fleet (Note: Redesignated Fighting Squadron 5B with transfer to the "Battle Fleet")	
VB-1B(2nd)		Red Rippers	F6C-3	VB-1B: 1 Jul 1928-1 Jul 1930	Bombing Squadron 1 of the Battle Fleet (Note: Redesignated a "Battle Fleet" Bombing Squadron operated from USS Lexington (CV 2))	
VF-5B(2nd)		Red Rippers	F4B-1	VF-5B(2nd): 1 Jul 1930-Jul 1932	Fighting Squadron 5 of the Battle Fleet (Note: Redesignated back to a Fighting Squadron, operated from USS Lexington (CV 2))	
VF-5S(2nd)		Red Rippers	F4B-1	VF-5S(2nd): Jul 1932-Apr 1933	Fighting Squadron 5 of the Scouting Fleet (Note: Transferred back to the "Scouting Fleet", continued operating from USS Lexington (CV 2))	
VF-5B(3rd)		Red Rippers	FF-1, F3F-1	VF-5B(3rd): Apr 1933-1 Jul 1937	Fighting Squadron 5 of the Battle Fleet (Note: Back to the "Battle Fleet", operated from USS Lexington (CV 2) and USS Ranger (CV 4))	
1 July 1937 Designation Scheme (by aircraft carrier hull number)		Red Rippers				
VF-4(2nd)		Red Rippers	F3F, F4F	VF-4(2nd): 1 Jul 1937-15 Mar 1941	Ranger (CV 4) Fighting Squadron (Note: Redesignated Fighting Squadron 4 when suffix letters were discontinued and squadrons were designated in accordance with the aircraft carrier to which they were assigned, VF-4 designated USS Ranger's (CV 4) Fighting Squadron)	
VF-41(1st)		Red Rippers	F4F	VF-41(1st): 15 Mar 1941-4 Aug 1943	One of two Ranger (CV 4) Fighting Squadrons (Note: Redesignated Fighting Squadron 41 when one of the air group's two Scouting Squadrons (VS-41) was redesignated as a second Fighting Squadron (VF-42))	
VF-4(4th)		Red Rippers	F4F, F6F	VF-4(4th): 4 Aug 1943-15 Nov 1946	Fighting Squadron of CVG-4 (Note: In December 1941 Ranger Air Group's second VF squadron VF-42 transferred to Yorktown Air Group. The transfer was intended to be temporary and there was no redesignation, however; it suffered significant losses in the Battle of Coral Sea in May 1942 and was disestablished the next month. VF-41 had been the sole VF squadron in Ranger Air Group since December 1941 and when Ranger Air Group was redesignated Carrier Air Group 4 (CVG-4) on 3 August 1943 the squadron was redesignated VF-4 the next day)	
15 November 1946 Designation Scheme (by Carrier Air Group with type suffix)		Red Rippers				
VF-1A		Red Rippers	F8F	VF-1A: 15 Nov 1946-2 Aug 1948	One of two Fighting Squadrons of CVAG-1 (Note: Redesignated Fighting Squadron 1A as the first of two Fighting Squadrons (the other was VF-2A) of Attack Carrier Air Group 1 (CVAG-1))	
1 September 1948 Designation Scheme (by Carrier Air Group until September 1964)		Red Rippers				
VF-11(2nd)		Red Rippers	F8F, F2H	VF-11(2nd): 2 Aug 1948 – 15 Feb 1959	First Fighter or Attack Squadron of CVG-1 (Note: Redesignated Fighter Squadron 11 as a Carrier Air Group 1 (CVG-1) fighter squadron. CVG-1 squadrons were VF-11, VF-12, VF-13, VA-14, VA-15)	15 February 1959

- USS Yorktown (CV-5) fighting squadron. Established 4 July 1927, disestablished 7 January 1943.

Fighting Squadron of USS Yorktown (CV 5) during the early months of WWII. Was disestablished after the loss of USS Yorktown in the Battle of Midway.

Designation	Insignia	Nickname	Aircraft (Note: Where not listed in a wikipedia article, aircraft assignment was derived from "http://www.wings-aviation.ch/25-Navy-Sqn/Squadron-Basis-en.htm")	Lineage	Notes (Note: Carrier assignment of early squadrons through 1937 were derived from "http://www.wings-aviation.ch")	Disestablished
1 July 1927 Designation Scheme (serially by type with Fleet suffix)
VF-3S(1st)			F6C, FB	VF-3S(1st): 4 Jul 1927 – 3 Mar 1928	Fighting Squadron 3 of the Scouting Fleet (Note: Established as Fighting Squadron 3S of the "Scouting Fleet." Operated from USS Lexington (CV 2))	
VF-3B(1st)			FB, F3B	VF-3B(1st): 3 Mar 1928-Apr 1931	Fighting Squadron 3 of the Battle Fleet (Note: Transferred to the "Battle Fleet." Operated from USS Lexington (CV 2))	
VF-3S(2nd)			F3B	VF-3S(2nd): Apr 1931-Jul 1932	Fighting Squadron 3 of the Scouting Fleet (Note: Transferred back to the "Scouting Fleet." Operated from USS Langley (CV 1))	
VF-3B(2nd)			F4B, F2F	VF-3B(2nd): Jul 1932-1 Jul 1937	Fighting Squaron 3 of the Battle Fleet (Note: Back to the "Battle Fleet." Operated from USS Langley (CV 1) and USS Ranger (CV 4))	
VF-7B			F2F		Fighting Squadron 7 of the Battle Fleet (Note: Established late Jun 1937 & immediately absorbed into VF-3B(2nd) before 1 July 1937)	
1 July 1937 Designation Scheme (by aircraft carrier hull number)
VF-5(2nd)		Striking Eagles	F2F, F3F, F4F	VF-5(2nd): 1 Jul 1937 – 7 Jan 1943	Yorktown (CV 5) Fighting Squadron (Note: Redesignated Fighting Squadron 5 when suffix letters were discontinued and squadrons were designated in accordance with the aircraft carrier to which they were assigned, VF-5 designated USS Yorktown's (CV 5) Fighting Squadron) (Note: Yorktown Air Group along with this squadron were disestablished after the 7 Jun 1942 sinking of USS Yorktown)	7 January 1943

- Second Fighting Squadron of Ranger Air Group. Established in May 1928, disestablished 22 June 1942.

Because of its smaller size, USS Ranger unlike other fleet carriers of the time had no room for torpedo storage and so she had no Torpedo Squadron. Instead of the standard air group consisting of one each Fighting (VF), Bombing (VB), Scouting (VS) and Torpedo (VT) she embarked one Fighting, one Bombing and two Scouting squadrons. This squadron was the Ranger Air Group's first Scouting Squadron (VS-41) with the second being designated VS-42. It was redesignated to be a second Ranger Air Group Fighting Squadron on 15 March 1941 when it was redesignated VF-42 and operated as such aboard Ranger in the Atlantic. It was "temporarily" moved to USS Yorktown to provide more fighters in the Pacific Theater during the early months of WWII where it suffered significant losses in the Battle of Coral Sea and was disestablished a month later.

Designation	Insignia	Nickname	Aircraft (Note: Where not listed in a wikipedia article, aircraft assignment was derived from "http://www.wings-aviation.ch/25-Navy-Sqn/Squadron-Basis-en.htm")	Lineage	Notes	Disestablished
1 July 1927 Designation Scheme (serially by type with Fleet suffix)
VS-1B(1st)				VS-1B(1st): May 1928 – 1930	Scouting Squadron 1 of the Battle Fleet (Note: Established as a Scouting Squadron of the "Battle Fleet")	
VS-1S				VS-1S: 1930–1931	Scouting Squadron 1 of the Scouting Fleet (Note: Redesignated as a Scouting Squadron of the "Scouting Fleet")	
VS-1B(2nd)				VS-1B(2nd): 1931-1 Jul 1937	Scouting Squadron 1 of the Battle Fleet (Note: Reassigned back to the "Battle Fleet")	
1 July 1937 Designation Scheme (by aircraft carrier hull number)
VS-41(1st)			SBD	VS-41(1st): 1 Jul 1937-15 Mar 1941	One of two Ranger (CV 4) Scouting Squadrons (Note: Redesignated Scouting Squadron 41 when suffix letters were discontinued and squadrons were designated in accordance with the aircraft carrier to which they were assigned, VS-41 designated one of two Scouting Squadrons intended for USS Ranger (CV 4) (the other being VS-42))	
VF-42(1st)			F4F	VF-42(1st): 15 Mar 1941 – 22 Jun 1942	One of two Ranger (CV 4) Fighting Squdrons (Note: Redesigned to provide two Fighting Squadrons instead of two Scouting Squadrons. In December 1941 the squadron was meant to be temporarily assigned to Yorktown Air Group, but it suffered significant losses in the Battle of Coral Sea in May 1942 and was disestablished the next month)	22 June 1942

- "Tomcatters"; second and current "Felix the Cat" squadron. Established 1 July 1935, still active as VFA-31.

Began WWII as USS Enterprise (CV 6) Fighting Squadron becoming the Fighting Squadron of CVG-6(1st) when that air group was established on 15 March 1943 and on 15 July 1943 was moved to USS Saratoga (CV 3) as VF-3(3rd) for the remainder of the war. Adopted VF-3(2nd)s Felix the Cat insignia even though VF-3(2nd) also kept it when it was moved to CVG-6(1st) as VF-6(3rd) as well. This squadron was left in sole possessesion of the insignia when the original owner was disestablished after the war and a third squadron which had also used the insignia (VBF-3) gave it up in 1946. This squadron still uses it today as the VFA-31 "Tomcatters".

Designation	Insignia	Nickname	Aircraft (Note: Where not listed in a wikipedia article, aircraft assignment was derived from "http://www.wings-aviation.ch/25-Navy-Sqn/Squadron-Basis-en.htm")	Lineage	Notes (Note: Carrier assignment of early squadrons through 1937 were derived from "http://www.wings-aviation.ch")	Current Designation
1 July 1927 Designation Scheme (serially by type with Fleet suffix)
VF-1B(2nd)		Shooting Stars	F4B	VF-1B(2nd):1 Jul 1935 – 1 Jul 1937	Fighting Squadron 1 of the Battle Fleet (Note: Established as Fighting Squadron 1B of the "Battle Fleet. Operated from USS Langley (CV 1))	
VF-8B			F4B		Fighting Squadron 8 of the Battle Fleet (Note: Established in June 1937 and immediately absorbed into VF-1B before 1 July 1937)	
1 July 1937 Designation Scheme (by aircraft carrier hull number)
VF-6(2nd)		Shooting Stars	F3F, F4F	VF-6(2nd): 1 Jul 1937-15 Jul 1943	Enterprise (CV 6) Fighting Squadron (Note: Redesignated Fighting Squadron 6 when suffix letters were discontinued and squadrons were designated in accordance with the aircraft carrier to which they were assigned, VF-6 designated USS Enterprise's (CV 6) Fighting Squadron) (Note: Became Fighting Squadron of CVG-6 when CVG-6 was established on 15 March 1943 after Enterprise Air Group had been disestablished on 1 September 1942 when USS Enterprise entered Pearl Harbor Naval Shipyard for extensive repair.)	
VF-3(3rd)	(Note: Adopted the Felix the Cat Insignia from the Saratoga's previous VT-3(2nd) which became VF-6(3rd) keeping the insignia resulting in both squadrons using it until its original owner was disestablished after the end of the War)	Shooting Stars	F6F	VF-3(3rd): 15 Jul 1943-15 Nov 1946	Saratoga (CV 3) Fighting Squadron (Note: Reassigned to USS Saratoga (CV 3) and redesignated Fighting Squadron 3) (Note: became Fighting Squadron of CVG-3 on 25 Sep 1943 when Saratoga Air Group was redesignated CVG-3)	
15 November 1946 Designation Scheme (by Carrier Air Group with type suffix)	(Note: Adopted the Felix the Cat Insignia from the Saratoga's previous VT-3(2nd) which became VF-6(3rd) keeping the insignia resulting in both squadrons using it until its original owner was disestablished after the end of the War)	Shooting Stars				
VF-3A	(Note: Adopted the Felix the Cat Insignia from the Saratoga's previous VT-3(2nd) which became VF-6(3rd) keeping the insignia resulting in both squadrons using it until its original owner was disestablished after the end of the War)	Shooting Stars	F6F	VF-3A: 15 Nov 1946-7 Aug 1948	One of two Fighting Squadrons of CVAG-3 (Note: Redesignated Fighting Squadron 3A as the first of two Fighting Squadrons (the other was VF-4A) of Attack Carrier Air Group 3 (CVAG-3))	
1 September 1948 Designation Scheme (by Carrier Air Group until September 1964)
VF-31(2nd)		Tomcatters	F9F, F2H, F3H/F-3, F-4, F-14	VF-31(2nd): 7 Aug 1948–2006	First Fighter or Attack Squadron of CVG-3 (Note: Redesignated Fighter Squadron 31 as a Carrier Air Group 3 (CVG-3) fighter squadron. CVG-3 squadrons were VF-31, VF-32, VF-33, VA-34, VA-35)	
VFA-31		Tomcatters	F/A-18E	VFA-31: 2006–present	Redesignated a Strike Fighter Squadron with replacement of the squadron's F-14 Tomcat with the F/A-18E Super Hornet	VFA-31

- USS Wasp Fighting Squadron. Established 1 July 1939, disestablished 29 March 1943.

Wasp Air Group and its squadrons were disestablished after the 15 Sep 1942 sinking of USS Wasp.

Designation	Insignia	Nickname	Aircraft (Note: Where not listed in a wikipedia article, aircraft assignment was derived from "http://www.wings-aviation.ch/25-Navy-Sqn/Squadron-Basis-en.htm")	Lineage	Notes	Disestablished
1 July 1937 Designation Scheme (by aircraft carrier hull number)
VF-7(1st)			F3F	VF-7(1st): 1 July 1939 – 19 Nov 1940	Wasp (CV 7) Fighting Squadron (Note: Established as Wasp Air Group's Fighting Squadron when Wasp Air Group was established on 1 July 1939)	
VF-72(1st)			F4F	VF-72(1st): 19 Nov 1940 – 29 Mar 1943	One of two Wasp (CV 7) Fighting Squadrons (Note: Redesignated VF-72 when the group's bombing squadron (VB-7) was redesignated VF-71 making two VF squadrons in the Air Group) (Note: Wasp Air Group along with this squadron were disestablished after the 15 Sep 1942 sinking of USS Wasp)	29 March 1943

- Second USS Wasp Fighting Squadron. Established 1 July 1939, disestablished 7 January 1943.

Wasp Air Group and its squadrons were disestablished after the 15 Sep 1942 sinking of USS Wasp.

Designation	Insignia	Nickname	Aircraft (Note: Where not listed in a wikipedia article, aircraft assignment was derived from "http://www.wings-aviation.ch/25-Navy-Sqn/Squadron-Basis-en.htm")	Lineage	Notes	Disestablished
1 July 1937 Designation Scheme (by aircraft carrier hull number)
VB-7(1st)			SBD	VB-7: 1 Jul 1939-5 Nov 1940	Wasp (CV 7) Bombing Squadron (Note: Established as Wasp Air Group's Bombing Squadron when Wasp Air Group was established on 1 July 1939)	
VF-71(1st)			F4F	VF-71(1st): 5 Nov 1940 – 7 Jan 1943	One of two Wasp (CV 7) Fighting Squadrons (Note: Redesignated as a second VF squadron in the Air Group)	7 January 1943

- Fighting Squadron of USS Hornet (CV 8). Established 2 September 1941, disestablished 28 August 1942.

USS Hornet's fighting squadron during the early months of WWII. Suffered significant losses during the Battle of Midway in June 1942 and was disestablished soon thereafter.

Designation	Insignia	Nickname	Aircraft (Note: Where not listed in a wikipedia article, aircraft assignment was derived from "http://www.wings-aviation.ch/25-Navy-Sqn/Squadron-Basis-en.htm")	Lineage	Notes	Disestablished
1 July 1937 Designation Scheme (by aircraft carrier hull number)
VF-8(1st)			F4F	VF-8(1st): 2 Sep 1941 – 28 Aug 1942	Hornet (CV 8) Fighting Squadron (Note: Established as Hornet Air Group's Fighting Squadron in advance of the group's establishment on 20 October 1941)	28 August 1942

=== World War II squadrons established 1942 through 1945 ===
There were 103 squadrons established during this time period which carried the VF designation for some period during their existence. Three of these squadrons are still active today.

On 1 March 1942 the first numbered Carrier Air Group was established and designated Carrier Air Group Nine (CVG-9). 87 more Carrier Air Groups followed being established during the war and numbered from 1 up to 153 (with many numbers skipped between 53 and 153). Squadrons were numbered with the carrier air group to which they were assigned so VF-9 was the fighting squadron of CVG-9, VF-22 was the fighting squadron of CVLG-22 and VF-26 was the fighting squadron of CVEG-26 etc... The numbered carrier air groups were initially established with numbers to match aircraft carrier hull numbers which were nearing commissioning with the initial intent being to match CVG-9 with USS Essex (CV 9) and CVLG-21 with USS Independence (CVL 21) for example, but they ultimately were not always assigned to specific aircraft carriers by hull number and they were often moved from one carrier to another when necessary.

CVGs operated from the three remaining pre-war aircraft carriers USS Saratoga, USS Ranger and USS Enterprise and all new Essex class carriers. There were three variations on the CVG designation with CVLGs for "Light" Independence class carriers, CVEGs for small Escort Carriers, and CVBGs for the large Midway class carriers which were nearing completion in the final months of the war.

Shortly before the end of the war in 1945 the two CVBGs were established initially with two VF Squadrons each and those squadrons were designated with an 'A' or 'B' appended to the end of the designation with VF-74A and VF-74B for CVBG-74 and VF-75A and VF-75B for CVBG-75.

Note: The parenthetical (1st), (2nd), (3rd) etc... appended to some designations in the table below are not a part of the designation system. They are added to indicate that the designation was used more than once during the history of U.S. Naval Aviation and which use of the designation is indicated. Absence indicates that the designation was used only once.

==== World War II squadrons disestablished by September 1946 ====
The squadrons listed in this table were established as VF squadrons during WWII and disestablished during the war or during the post war drawdown. There are also fourteen squadrons included below listed in italics which were not disestablished during the war or post war drawdown and whose post war designations are detailed in the following table.

Designation	Insignia	Nickname	Aircraft (Note: Where not listed in a wikipedia article, aircraft assignment was derived from "http://www.wings-aviation.ch/25-Navy-Sqn/Squadron-Basis-en.htm")	Established (YYYY-MM-DD)	Disestablished (YYYY-MM-DD)	Notes
1 March 1942 Designation Scheme (by Carrier Air Group)
VF-1(2nd); VF-5(3rd) (Note: This squadron was not disestablished during WWII or the during the post war drawdown. It is included in this table only for continuity purposes. It is listed in the next section detailing its post war designation(s))				1943-02-15	After Sep 1946	See next section
VF-2(4th)		Rippers	FM-1; F6F	1943-06-01	1945-11-09	
VF-4(3rd); VF-1(3rd)	(Note: In 1934 the original VF-4 (by then the original VF-1) "Top Hatters" was redesignated as a Bombing Squadron (VB). The "Top Hatters" were still a VB squadron when this squadron was established as VF-4 and the name and insignia adopted by this VF squadron very closely imitated the name and insignia of that original VF-4/original VF-1)	High Hatters	F6F	1943-05-01	1945-10-25	Designations: (Note: VF-4 (3rd) was established in May 1943 intended for CVG-4 but was redesignated VF-1 (3rd) two and a half months later in July and assigned to CVG-1.); VF-4(3rd): 1 May 1943 – 15 Jul 1943; VF-1(3rd): 15 Jul 1943 – 25 Oct 1945
VF-7(2nd)			F6F	1944-01-03	1946-06-08	
VF-8(2nd)		Hellcats	F6F	1943-06-01	1945-11-23	
VF-9			F2A; F4F; F6F	1942-03-01	1945-09-28	
VF-10		Grim Reapers	F4F; F6F; F4U	1942-06-03	1945-11-26	Original Grim Reapers squadron
VF-11(1st) (Note: This squadron was not disestablished during WWII or the during the post war drawdown. It is included in this table only for continuity purposes. It is listed in the next section detailing its post war designation(s))				1942-10-10	After Sep 1946	See next section
VF-12(1st)			F6F	1943-01-09	1945-09-17	
VF-13(1st)		Black Cats	F6F	1943-11-02	1945-10-20	
VF-14(1st)			F6F	1943-09-01	1946-06-14	
VF-15		Satan's Playmates	F6F	1942-09-01	1945-10-20	
VF-16		Fighting Airedales	F6F	1942-11-16	1945-11-06	
VF-17 (Note: This squadron was not disestablished during WWII or the during the post war drawdown. It is included in this table only for continuity purposes. It is listed in the next section detailing its post war designation(s))				1943-01-01	After Sep 1946	See next section
VF-18(1st)			F6F	1943-07-20	1944-03-05	
VF-19 (Note: This squadron was not disestablished during WWII or the during the post war drawdown. It is included in this table only for continuity purposes. It is listed in the next section detailing its post war designation(s))				1943-08-15	After Sep 1946	See next section
VF-20 (Note: This squadron was not disestablished during WWII or the during the post war drawdown. It is included in this table only for continuity purposes. It is listed in the next section detailing its post war designation(s))				1943-08-15	After Sep 1946	See next section
VF-21(1st)			F4F; F6F	1942-08-05	1945-11-05	Designations: (Note: In March 1943 all "Escort-Scouting Squadrons" (VGS) assigned to Escort Carriers were redesignated Composite Squadrons (VC). Composite Squadrons were single squadrons composed of both Fighters and Bombers which were paired with the vast majority of Escort Carriers as only the largest Escort Carriers were paired with CVEGs. Later in the year five VC Squadrons were redesignated Fighting Squadrons (VF)); VGS-11: 5 Aug 1942-1 Mar 1943; VC-11(1st): 1 Mar 1943-16 May 1943; VF-21(1st): 16 May 1943 – 5 Nov 1945
VF-22(1st)			F4F; F6F	1943-09-30	1945-09-19	
VF-23(1st)			F6F	1942-11-16	1945-09-19	
VF-24(1st)			F6F	1942-12-31	1945-09-25	
VF-25			F6F	1943-02-15	1945-09-20	
VF-26(1st)			F4F	1942-05-04	1945-11-13	Designations: (Note: In March 1943 all "Escort-Fighter Squadrons" (VGF) assigned to Escort or Light Carrier Air Groups (CVEG, CVLG) were redesignated Fighting Squadrons (VF)); VGF-26: 4 May 1942-1 Mar 1943; VF-26(1st): 1 Mar 1943 – 13 Nov 1945
VF-27			F4F; F6F	1942-04-22	1945-11-26	Designations: (Note: In March 1943 all "Escort-Fighter Squadrons" (VGF) assigned to Escort or Light Carrier Air Groups (CVEG, CVLG) were redesignated Fighting Squadrons (VF)); VGF-27: 22 Apr 1942-1 Mar 1943; VF-27: 1 Mar 1943 – 26 Nov 1945
VF-28			F4F; F6F	1942-05-04	1945-11-06	Designations: (Note: In March 1943 all "Escort-Fighter Squadrons" (VGF) assigned to Escort or Light Carrier Air Groups (CVEG, CVLG) were redesignated Fighting Squadrons (VF)); VGF-28: 4 May 1942-1 Mar 1943; VF-28: 1 Mar 1943 – 6 Nov 1945
VF-29			F4F; F6F	1942-07-20	1945-09-10	Designations: (Note: In March 1943 all "Escort-Fighter Squadrons" (VGF) assigned to Escort or Light Carrier Air Groups (CVEG, CVLG) were redesignated Fighting Squadrons (VF)); VGF-29: 20 Jul 1942-1 Mar 1943; VF-29: 1 Mar 1943 – 10 Sep 1945
VF-30			F6F	1943-04-01	1945-09-12	
VF-31(1st)			F6F	1943-05-01	1945-10-25	
VF-32(1st)			F6F	1943-06-01	1945-11-13	
VF-33(1st)		Hellcats	F6F	1942-08-06	1945-11-19	Designations: (Note: In March 1943 all "Escort-Scouting Squadrons" (VGS) assigned to Escort Carriers were redesignated Composite Squadrons (VC). Composite Squadrons were single squadrons composed of both Fighters and Bombers which were paired with the vast majority of Escort Carriers as only the largest Escort Carriers were paired with CVEGs. Later in the year five VC Squadrons were redesignated Fighting Squadrons (VF)); VGS-16: 6 Aug 1942-1 Mar 1943; VC-16: 1 Mar 1943-15 Aug 1943; VF-33(1st): 15 Aug 1943 – 9 Nov 1945
VF-34(1st)			F6F	1943-02-24	1944-07-08	Designations: (Note: In March 1943 all "Escort-Scouting Squadrons" (VGS) assigned to Escort Carriers were redesignated Composite Squadrons (VC). Composite Squadrons were single squadrons composed of both Fighters and Bombers which were paired with the vast majority of Escort Carriers as only the largest Escort Carriers were paired with CVEGs. Later in the year five VC Squadrons were redesignated Fighting Squadrons (VF)); VGS-34: 24 Feb 1943-1 Mar 1943; VC-34(1st): 1 Mar 1943-15 Aug 1943; VF-34(1st): 15 Aug 1943 – 8 Jul 1944
VF-34(2nd)			F6F	1945-04-01	1945-12-05	
VF-35			F6F	1943-07-15	1945-11-19	
VF-36(1st); VF-18(2nd) (Note: This squadron was not disestablished during WWII or the during the post war drawdown. It is included in this table only for continuity purposes. It is listed in the next section detailing its post war designation(s))				1942-08-15	After Sep 1946	See next section
VF-36(2nd)			F6F	1944-05-15	1946-01-28	
VF-37			F6F	1943-07-15	1945-12-20	
VF-38			F6F	1943-06-20	1946-01-31	
VF-39(1st)			F6F	1943-06-01	1944-07-15	Designations: (Note: Composite Squadrons (VC) were single squadrons composed of both Fighters and Bombers which were paired with the vast majority of Escort Carriers as only the largest Escort Carriers were paired with CVEGs. In August 1943 five VC Squadrons were redesignated Fighting Squadrons (VF)); VC-64: 1 Jun 1943-15 Aug 1943; VF-39(1st): 15 Aug 1943 – 15 Jul 1944
VF-39(2nd)			F6F	1945-05-15	1945-09-10	
VF-40			F6F	1943-06-15	1945-11-19	
VF-41(2nd) (Note: This squadron was not disestablished during WWII or the during the post war drawdown. It is included in this table only for continuity purposes. It is listed in the next section detailing its post war designation(s))				1945-03-45	After Sep 1946	See next section
VF-42(2nd) (Note: This squadron was not disestablished during WWII or the during the post war drawdown. It is included in this table only for continuity purposes. It is listed in the next section detailing its post war designation(s))				1945-07-19	After Sep 1946	See next section
VF-43(1st)				1943-08-01	1943-11-08	
VF-43(2nd)				1945-08-09	1946-06-17	
VF-44(1st)			F6F	1944-02-01	1945-09-18	
VF-45(1st)		Gamecocks	F6F	1944-04-01	1945-09-10	
VF-46		Men-O-War	F6F	1944-04-15	1945-09-14	
VF-47			F6F	1944-05-15	1945-09-21	
VF-48			F6F	1944-06-15	1945-01-02	
VF-49			F6F	1944-08-10	1945-11-27	
VF-50			F6F	1944-08-10	1945-10-29	
VF-51(1st)			F6F	1943-09-22	1945-11-13	
VF-52(1st)				1943-09-01	1943-11-08	
VF-52(2nd)				1945-01-06	1945-05-25	(Note: VF squadron assigned to Night Carrier Air Group (CVG(N)) 52 from 6 Jan to 25 May 1945 alongside specialized night fighter VF(N) and night torpedo VT(N) squadrons.)
VF-53(1st)			F6F	1945-01-02	1945-04-01	(Note: VF squadron assigned to Night Carrier Air Group (CVG(N)) 53 from 2 Jan to 1 Apr 1945 alongside specialized night fighter VF(N) and night torpedo VT(N) squadrons.)
VF-60			F6F	1943-07-15	1945-11-19	
VF-66		Firebirds	FR-1	1945-01-01	1945-10-18	
VF-74(1st)			F6F	1944-03-25	1944-10-01	
VF-74A; VF-74(2nd) (Note: This squadron was not disestablished during WWII or the during the post war drawdown. It is included in this table only for continuity purposes. It is listed in the next section detailing its post war designation(s))				1945-05-01	After Sep 1946	See next section
VF-74B				1945-05-01	1945-08-01	(Note: Carrier Air Group 74 (CVBG-74) was established 1 May 1945 and assigned to a "new" large Midway class carrier. It was initially assigned two VF squadrons, VF-74A and VF-74B)
VF-75A; VF-75 (Note: This squadron was not disestablished during WWII or the during the post war drawdown. It is included in this table only for continuity purposes. It is listed in the next section detailing its post war designation(s))				1945-07-01	After Sep 1946	See next section
VF-75B				1945-06-01	1945-08-01	(Note: Carrier Air Group 75 (CVBG-75) was established 1 Jun 1945 and assigned to a "new" large Midway class carrier. It was initially assigned two VF squadrons, VF-75A and VF-75B)
VF-80		Vipers	F6F-5	1944-02-01	1946-09-16	
VF-81(1st) (Note: This squadron was not disestablished during WWII or the during the post war drawdown. It is included in this table only for continuity purposes. It is listed in the next section detailing its post war designation(s))				1944-03-02	After Sep 1946	See next section
VF-82(1st) (Note: This squadron was not disestablished during WWII or the during the post war drawdown. It is included in this table only for continuity purposes. It is listed in the next section detailing its post war designation(s))				1944-04-01	After Sep 1946	See next section
VF-83(1st)			F6F-5	1944-05-01	1945-09-24	
VF-84(1st)		Wolf Gang	F4U; F6F	1944-05-01	1945-10-08	
VF-85			F4U; F6F	1944-05-01	1945-09-27	
VF-86			F6F	1944-06-15	1945-11-21	
VF-87			F6F	1944-07-01	1945-11-02	
VF-88			F6F	1944-08-15	1945-10-29	
VF-89			F4U	1944-10-02	1946-04-27	
VF-92(1st)		Hells Kittens	F6F	1944-12-01	1945-12-18	
VF-93(1st)		Polecats	F6F	1944-12-15	1946-04-30	
VF-94(1st)		Tough Kitties	F6F	1944-11-15	1945-11-07	
VF-95			F4U	1945-01-02	1945-10-31	
VF-97				1944-11-01	1946-03-31	
VF-98 (Note: This squadron was not disestablished during WWII or the during the post war drawdown. It is included in this table only for continuity purposes. It is listed in the next section detailing its post war designation(s))				1944-08-28	After Sep 1946	See next section
VF-99			F4U	1944-07-15	1945-09-06	
VF-100			F4U	1944-04-01	1946-02-20	
VF-150			F4U	1945-01-22	1945-11-02	
VF-151(1st)			F4U	1945-02-12	1945-10-06	
VF-152(1st)			F4U	1945-03-05	1945-09-21	
VF-153 (Note: This squadron was not disestablished during WWII or the during the post war drawdown. It is included in this table only for continuity purposes. It is listed in the next section detailing its post war designation(s))				1945-03-26	After Sep 1946	See next section
VF-301(1st)				1944-01-03	1944-08-01	
VF-302(1st)				1944-01-15	1944-08-01	
VF-303				1944-03-01	1944-05-04	

==== World War II squadrons not disestablished by September 1946 ====
The squadrons listed below were established during WWII but were not disestablished during the war or during the post war drawdown. They were redesignated on 15 November 1946 in accordance with the new designation scheme which took effect on that date.

By the end of September 1946 as a result of the post war drawdown the Navy was left with 14 of its WWII Carrier Air Groups which consisted of four squadrons each. Those squadrons were one Fighting (VF), one Bombing Fighting (VBF), one Bombing (VB) and one Torpedo (VF) squadron. It also was left with two smaller Escort Carrier Air Groups each consisting of one Fighting (VF) squadron and one Torpedo (VT) squadron. On 15 November 1946 the Bombing Fighting (VBF) squadrons were all redesignated Fighting (VF) squadrons and the Bombing (VB) and Torpedo (VF) squadrons were all redesignated Attack (VA) squadrons leaving 14 Carrier Air Groups with two Fighting (VF) and two Attack (VA) squadrons each and the two smaller Escort Carrier Air Groups each with one Fighting (VF) and one Attack (VA) squadron.

When the 15 November 1946 designation scheme was implemented those 14 remaining WWII CVGs and their squadrons were redesignated in accordance with it. CVAGs and CVBGs were all designated with odd numbers (CVAG-1, CVAG-3, CVAG-5 etc..., CVBG-1, CVBG-3 etc...) and their two VF squadrons were numbered with the first squadron carrying the Air Group's number and the second squadron the next consecutive even number. A letter suffix was appended to denote the type of air group the squadron was a part of (CVAG-1: VF-1A, VF-2A; CVBG-1: VF-1B, VF-2B; CVAG-7: VF-7A, VF-8A; CVAG-11; VF-11A, VF-12A etc...). Two CVEGs were each assigned a single VF squadron which carried the CVEG's number followed by an E (CVEG-1: VF-1E, CVEG-2: VF-2E).

Note: The parenthetical (1st), (2nd), (3rd) etc... appended to some designations below are not a part of the designation system. They are added to indicate that the designation was used more than once during the history of U.S. Naval Aviation and which use of the designation is indicated. Absence indicates that the designation was used only once.

Fighting Squadron(VF) and Bombing Fighting Squadron(VBF) of CVG-3(1st)

- Second and current "Felix the Cat" squadron. 1 July 1935 to present. This squadron was established prior to WWII and is included in this section only for continuity purposes. Only the last four designations are shown here, the entire squadron is listed in the "Pre-WWII squadrons" section of the article

Designation	Insignia	Nickname	Aircraft (Note: Where not listed in a wikipedia article, aircraft assignment was derived from "http://www.wings-aviation.ch/25-Navy-Sqn/Squadron-Basis-en.htm")	Lineage	Notes	Current Designation
1 March 1942 Designation Scheme (by Carrier Air Group)
VF-3(3rd)	(Note: Adopted the Felix the Cat Insignia from the Saratoga's previous VT-3(2nd) which became VF-6(3rd) keeping the insignia resulting in both squadrons using it until its original owner was disestablished after the end of the War)	Shooting Stars	F6F	VF-3(3rd): 15 Jul 1943-15 Nov 1946	Fighting Squadron of CVG-3(1st)	
15 November 1946 Designation Scheme (by Carrier Air Group with type suffix)	(Note: Adopted the Felix the Cat Insignia from the Saratoga's previous VT-3(2nd) which became VF-6(3rd) keeping the insignia resulting in both squadrons using it until its original owner was disestablished after the end of the War)					
VF-3A	(Note: Adopted the Felix the Cat Insignia from the Saratoga's previous VT-3(2nd) which became VF-6(3rd) keeping the insignia resulting in both squadrons using it until its original owner was disestablished after the end of the War)	Shooting Stars	F6F	VF-3A: 15 Nov 1946-7 Aug 1948	1st Fighting Squadron of CVAG-3	
1 September 1948 Designation Scheme (by Carrier Air Group until September 1964)
VF-31(2nd)		Tomcatters	F9F, F2H, F3H/F-3, F-4, F-14	VF-31(2nd): 7 Aug 1948–2006	1st Fighter Squadron of CVG-3(2nd)	
VFA-31		Tomcatters	F/A-18E	VFA-31: 2006–present	Redesignated Strike Fighter Sqdn with replacement of the F-14 with the F/A-18E	VFA-31

- VBF-3/VF-4A/VF-32(2nd)/VFA-32: Established 1 February 1945, currently active as VFA-32

Designation	Insignia	Nickname	Aircraft (Note: Where not listed in a wikipedia article, aircraft assignment was derived from "http://www.wings-aviation.ch/25-Navy-Sqn/Squadron-Basis-en.htm")	Lineage	Notes	Current Designation
1 March 1942 Designation Scheme (by Carrier Air Group)
VBF-3	(Note: Because VBF-3 had been established by being split out VF-3(3rd) the squadron originally called themselves the "Crazy Cats" and used the Felix the Cat insignia which made them the third squadron along with VF-3(3rd) and VF-6(3rd) to use the Felix the Cat insignia at the same time. As VF-4A the squadron abandoned the Felix the Cat insignia, called themselves "White Lightining" and created a new insignia)	Crazy Cats	F6F	VBF-3: 1 Feb 1945-15 Nov 1946	Bombing Fighting Squadron (Note: By 1945 VF squadrons had grown very large and they were split in two creating a second fighting squadron in each CVG which was designated a "Bombing Fighting" squadron (VBF)) of CVG-3(1st)	
15 November 1946 Designation Scheme (by Carrier Air Group with type suffix)
VF-4A		White Lightning	F8F	VF-4A: 15 Nov 1946 – 7 Aug 1948	2nd Fighting Squadron of CVAG-3 (Note: CVG-3(1st redesignated CVAG-3 with two fighting squadrons, VF-3A and VF-4A)	
1 September 1948 Designation Scheme (by Carrier Air Group until September 1964)
VF-32(2nd)		White Lightning, Swordsman (Note: (1956))	F4U, F9F-6, F8U/F-8, F-4, F-14	VF-32(2nd): 7 Aug 1948-Nov 2005	2nd Fighter Squadron of CVG-3(2nd) (Note: CVAG-3 redesignated CVG-3(2nd) and its squadrons VF-31(2nd) and VF-32(2nd))	
VFA-32		Swordsmen	F/A-18F	VFA-32: 1 Aug 2006–present	Redesignated Strike Fighter Sqdn with replacement of the F-14 with the F/A-18E	VFA-32

Fighting Squadron(VF) and Bombing Fighting Squadron(VBF) of CVG-4(1st)

- Original "Red Rippers" squadron. 1 February 1927 to 15 February 1959. This squadron was established prior to WWII and is included in this section only for continuity purposes. Only the last three designations are shown here, the entire squadron is listed in the "Pre-WWII squadrons" section of the article

Designation	Insignia	Nickname	Aircraft (Note: Where not listed in a wikipedia article, aircraft assignment was derived from "http://www.wings-aviation.ch/25-Navy-Sqn/Squadron-Basis-en.htm")	Lineage	Notes	Disestablished
VF-4(4th)		Red Rippers	F4F, F6F	VF-4(4th): 4 Aug 1943-15 Nov 1946	Fighting Squadron of CVG-4(1st)	
15 November 1946 Designation Scheme (by Carrier Air Group with type suffix)
VF-1A		Red Rippers	F8F	VF-1A: 15 Nov 1946-2 Aug 1948	1st Fighting Squadron of CVAG-1	
1 September 1948 Designation Scheme (by Carrier Air Group until September 1964)
VF-11(2nd)		Red Rippers	F8F, F2H	VF-11(2nd): 2 Aug 1948 – 15 Feb 1959	1st Fighter Squadron of CVG-1(2nd)	15 February 1959

- VBF-4/VF-2A/VF-12(2nd)/VA-12: Established 12 May 1945, disestablished 1 October 1986

Designation	Insignia	Nickname	Aircraft (Note: Where not listed in a wikipedia article, aircraft assignment was derived from "http://www.wings-aviation.ch/25-Navy-Sqn/Squadron-Basis-en.htm")	Lineage	Notes	Disestablished
1 March 1942 Designation Scheme (by Carrier Air Group)
VBF-4		Ubangis	F6F	VBF-4: 12 May 1945-15 Nov 1946	Bombing Fighting Squadron (Note: By 1945 VF squadrons had grown very large and they were split in two creating a second fighting squadron in each CVG which was designated a "Bombing Fighting" squadron (VBF)) of CVG-4(1st)	
15 November 1946 Designation Scheme (by Carrier Air Group with type suffix)		Ubangis				
VF-2A		Ubangis	F6F, F4U, F8F	VF-2A: 15 Nov 1946 – 2 Aug 1948	2nd Fighting Squadron of CVAG-1 (Note: CVG-4(1st was redesignated CVAG-1 with two fighting squadrons, VF-1A and VF-2A)	
1 September 1948 Designation Scheme (by Carrier Air Group until September 1964)		Ubangis				
VF-12(2nd)		Ubangis	F8F, F2H	VF-12(2nd): 2 Aug 1948 – 1 Aug 1955	2nd Fighter Squadron of CVG-1(2nd) (Note: CVAG-1 redesignated CVG-1(2nd) and its fighting squadrons VF-11(2nd) and VF-12(2nd))	
VA-12		Ubangis, Clinchers (Note: (1982))	F2H, F7U, AD4/A-4, A-7	VA-12: 1 Aug 1955-1 Oct 1986	Converted to a CVG-1(2nd) Attack Squadron	1 October 1986

Fighting Squadron(VF) and Bombing Fighting Squadron(VBF) of CVG-5(1st)

- VF-1(2nd)/VF-5(3rd)/VF-5A/VF-51(2nd): Established 15 February 1943, disestablished 31 March 1995

Designation	Insignia	Nickname	Aircraft (Note: Where not listed in a wikipedia article, aircraft assignment was derived from "http://www.wings-aviation.ch/25-Navy-Sqn/Squadron-Basis-en.htm")	Lineage	Notes	Disestablished
1 March 1942 Designation Scheme (by Carrier Air Group)
VF-1(2nd)		Fighting Hellcats	F6F	VF-1(2nd): 15 Feb 1943 – 15 Jul 1943	(Note: VF-1 (2nd) was established in February 1943 intended for CVG-1 but was redesignated VF-5 (3rd) five months later in July and assigned to CVG-5)	
VF-5(3rd)		Fighting Hellcats	F6F, F4U	VF-5(3rd): 15 Jul 1943 – 15 Nov 1946	Fighting Squadron of CVG-5(1st)	
15 November 1946 Designation Scheme (by Carrier Air Group with type suffix)
VF-5A	(Note: Adopted from disestablished VF-5(2nd))	Screaming Eagles (Note: Adopted from disestablished VF-5(2nd))	F8F, FJ-1	VF-5A: 15 Nov 1946 – 16 Aug 1948	1st Fighting Squadron of CVAG-5 (Note: On 15 November 1946 CVG-5 was redesignated CVAG-5 with two fighting squadrons VF-5A and VF-6A)	
1 September 1948 Designation Scheme (by Carrier Air Group until September 1964)
VF-51(2nd)		Screaming Eagles	FJ, F9F Panther, F9F Cougar, F8U/F-8, F-4, F-14	VF-51(2nd): 16 Aug 1948 – 31 Mar 1995	1st Fighter Squadron of CVG-5(2nd) (Note: On 1 sep 48 CVAG-5 was redesignated CVG-5(2nd) and its VF squadrons VF-51(2nd) and VF-52(3rd))	31 March 1995

- VBF-5/VF-6A/VF-52(3rd): Established 8 May 1945, disestablished 23 February 1959

Designation	Insignia	Nickname	Aircraft (Note: Where not listed in a wikipedia article, aircraft assignment was derived from "http://www.wings-aviation.ch/25-Navy-Sqn/Squadron-Basis-en.htm")	Lineage	Notes	Disestablished
1 March 1942 Designation Scheme (by Carrier Air Group)
VBF-5		Knightriders	F4U-4	VBF-5: 8 May 1945-15 Nov 1946	Bombing Fighting Squadron (Note: By 1945 VF squadrons had grown very large and they were split in two creating a second fighting squadron in each CVG which was designated a "Bombing Fighting" squadron (VBF)) of CVG-5(1st)	
15 November 1946 Designation Scheme (by Carrier Air Group with type suffix)
VF-6A		Knightriders	F4U-4	VF-6A: 15 Nov 1946 – 16 Aug 1948	2nd Fighting Squadron of CVAG-5	
1 September 1948 Designation Scheme (by Carrier Air Group until September 1964)
VF-52(3rd)		Sea Lancers	TO-1, F9F-2, F2H-3	VF-52(3rd): 16 Aug 1948 – 23 Feb 1959	2nd Fighting Squadron of CVG-5(2nd)	23 February 1959

Fighting Squadron(VF) and Bombing Fighting Squadron(VBF) of CVG-11(1st)

- VF-11(1st)/VF-11A/VF-111(1st): Established 10 October 1942, disestablished 19 January 1959

Designation	Insignia	Nickname	Aircraft (Note: Where not listed in a wikipedia article, aircraft assignment was derived from "http://www.wings-aviation.ch/25-Navy-Sqn/Squadron-Basis-en.htm")	Lineage	Notes	Disestablished
1 March 1942 Designation Scheme (by Carrier Air Group)
VF-11(1st)		Sundowners (Note: Original "Sundowners" squadron)	F4F, F6F	VF-11(1st): 10 Oct 1942 – 15 Nov 1946	Fighting Squadron of CVG-11(1st) (Note: Carrier Air Group 11 (CVG-11) established 10 Oct 1942, redesignated CVAG-11 15 Nov 1946)	
15 November 1946 Designation Scheme (by Carrier Air Group with type suffix)
VF-11A		Sundowners	F8F	VF-11A: 15 Nov 1946 – 15 Jul 1948	1st Fighting Squadron of CVAG-11 (Note: CVG-11(1st) redesignated CVAG-11 on 15 Nov 1946 with two Fighting Squadrons, VF-11A and VF-12A)	
1 September 1948 Designation Scheme (by Carrier Air Group until September 1964)
VF-111(1st)		Sundowners	F9F-2, F9F-8, FJ-3	VF-111(1st)15 Jul 1948 – 19 Jan 1959	1st Fighter Squadron of CVG-11(2nd) (Note: On 1 sep 48 CVAG-11 was redesignated CVG-11(2nd) and its VF squadrons were redesignated VF-111(1st) and VF-112)	19 January 1959

- VBF-11/VF-12A/VF-112/VA-112: Established 9 April 1945, disestablished 10 October 1969

Designation	Insignia	Nickname	Aircraft (Note: Where not listed in a wikipedia article, aircraft assignment was derived from "http://www.wings-aviation.ch/25-Navy-Sqn/Squadron-Basis-en.htm")	Lineage	Notes	Disestablished
1 March 1942 Designation Scheme (by Carrier Air Group)
VBF-11			F6F	VBF-11: 9 Apr 1945-15 Nov 1946	Bombing Fighting Squadron (Note: By 1945 VF squadrons had grown very large and they were split in two creating a second fighting squadron in each CVG which was designated a "Bombing Fighting" squadron (VBF)) of CVG-11(1st)	
15 November 1946 Designation Scheme (by Carrier Air Group with type suffix)
VF-12A			F6F, F8F	VF-12A: 15 Nov 1946 – 15 July 1948	2nd Fighting Squadron of CVAG-11	
1 September 1948 Designation Scheme (by Carrier Air Group until September 1964)
VF-112			F8F, F9F Panther, F9F Cougar, F3H	VF-112: 15 Jul 1948 – 15 Feb 1959	2nd Fighter Squadron of CVG-11(2nd)	
VA-112		Broncos (Note: (1961))	A4D/A-4	VA-112: 15 Feb 1959-10 Oct 1969	Converted to a CVG-11(2nd) Attack Squadron	10 October 1969

Fighting Squadron(VF) and Bombing Fighting Squadron(VBF) of CVG-17(1st)

- VF-17/VF-5B/VF-61: Original "Jolly Rogers" squadron Established 1 January 1943, disestablished 15 April 1959

Designation	Insignia	Nickname	Aircraft (Note: Where not listed in a wikipedia article, aircraft assignment was derived from "http://www.wings-aviation.ch/25-Navy-Sqn/Squadron-Basis-en.htm")	Lineage	Notes	Disestablished
1 March 1942 Designation Scheme (by Carrier Air Group)
VF-17		Jolly Rogers (Note: Original "Jolly Rogers" squadron)	F4U-1, F6F-5	VF-17: 1 Jan 1943 – 15 Nov 1946	Fighting Squadron of CVG-17(1st) (Note: Carrier Air Group 17 (CVG-17) established 1 Jan 1943, redesignated CVBG-17 23 Jan 1946, redesignated CVBG-5 15 Nov 1946)	
15 November 1946 Designation Scheme (by Carrier Air Group with type suffix)
VF-5B(4th)		Jolly Rogers	F4U-4, F8F-2	VF-5B(4th): 15 Nov 1946 – 28 Jul 1948	1st Fighting Squadron of CVBG-5 (Note: CVBG-17 redesignated CVBG-5 on 15 Nov 1945 with two Fighting Squadrons, VF-5B and VF-6B)	
1 September 1948 Designation Scheme (by Carrier Air Group until September 1964)
VF-61		Jolly Rogers	F8F, F9F Panther, F9F Cougar, FJ-3, F3H	VF-61: 28 Jul 1948 – 15 Apr 1959	1st Fighter Squadron of CVG-6(2nd) (Note: On 1 sep 48 CVBG-5 was redesignated CVG-6(2nd) and its VF squadrons were redesignated VF-61 and VF-62)	15 April 1959

- VBF-17/VF-6B(3rd)/VF-62(1st)/VA-106(2nd): Established 2 January 1945, disestablished 7 November 1969

Designation	Insignia	Nickname	Aircraft (Note: Where not listed in a wikipedia article, aircraft assignment was derived from "http://www.wings-aviation.ch/25-Navy-Sqn/Squadron-Basis-en.htm")	Lineage	Notes	Disestablished
1 March 1942 Designation Scheme (by Carrier Air Group)
VBF-17 (3rd)			F4U	VBF-17: 2 Jan 1945-15 Nov 1946	Bombing Fighting Squadron of CVG-17(1st)	
15 November 1946 Designation Scheme (by Carrier Air Group with type suffix)
VF-6B (3rd)			F4U, F8F	VF-6B(3rd): 15 Nov 1946 – 28 Jul 1948	2nd Fighting Squadron of CVBG-5	
1 September 1948 Designation Scheme (by Carrier Air Group until September 1964)
VF-62(1st)	(Note: (1952))	Gladiators (Note: (1952))	F8F, F2H	VF-62(1st): 28 Jul 1948 – 1 Jul 1955	2nd Fighter Squadron of CVG-6(2nd)	
VA-106(2nd)		Gladiators	F2H, F9F-8, A4D/A-4	VA-106(2nd): 1 Jul 1955-7 Nov 1969	6th Fighter or Attack Squadron of CVG-10(2nd) (Note: moved to CVG-10(2nd) as an Attack Squadron. CVG-10(2nd) squadrons were VF-101, VF-102, VF-103, VA-104, VA-105 and this squadron VA-106)	7 November 1969

Fighting Squadron(VF) and Bombing Fighting Squadron(VBF) of CVG-18

- VGS-18/VC-18/VF-36(1st)/VF-18(2nd)/VF-7A/VF-71(2nd): Established 15 October 1942, disestablished 31 March 1959

Designation	Insignia	Nickname	Aircraft (Note: Where not listed in a wikipedia article, aircraft assignment was derived from "http://www.wings-aviation.ch/25-Navy-Sqn/Squadron-Basis-en.htm")	Lineage	Notes	Disestablished
1 March 1942 Designation Scheme (by Carrier Air Group)
VGS-18			F4F	VGS-18: 15 Oct 1942-1 Mar 1943	(Note: Established as an "Escort Scouting Squadron" for assignment to an escort carrier)	
VC-18			F4F	VC-18: 1 Mar 1943-15 Aug 1943	(Note: In March 1943 all "Escort-Scouting Squadrons" (VGS) assigned to Escort Carriers were redesignated Composite Squadrons (VC). Composite Squadrons were single squadrons composed of both Fighters and Bombers which were paired with the vast majority of Escort Carriers as only the largest Escort Carriers were paired with CVEGs. Later in the year five VC Squadrons were redesignated Fighting Squadrons (VF))	
VF-36(1st)			F4F	VF-36(1st): 15 Aug 1943 – 5 Mar 1944	(Note: Redesignated VF-36 intended for Escort Carrier Air Group 36 (CVEG-36) however establishment of CVEG-36 was delayed and it was redesignated VF-18(2nd) for CVG-18 when the first VF-18 was disestablished)	
VF-18(2nd)			F4F, F6F, F8F	VF-18(2nd): 5 Mar 1944 – 15 Nov 1946	Fighting Squadron of CVG-18(1st)	
15 November 1946 Designation Scheme (by Carrier Air Group with type suffix)
VF-7A			F8F	VF-7A: 15 Nov 1946 – 28 Jul 1948	1st Fighting Squadron of CVAG-7 (Note: CVG-18 was redesignated CVAG-7 on 15 Nov 1946 with two fighting squadrons, VF-7A and VF-8A)	
1 September 1948 Designation Scheme (by Carrier Air Group until September 1964)
VF-71(2nd)	(Note: adopted from the first VF-71)	Screaming Deamons	F9F-2, F2H-4	VF-71(2nd): 28 Jul 1948 – 31 Mar 1959	1st Fighter Squadron of CVG-7(2nd) (Note: On 1 sep 48 CVAG-7 was redesignated CVG-7(2nd) and its VF squadrons VF-71(2nd) and VF-72(2nd))	31 March 1959

- VBF-18(2nd)/VF-8A/VF-72(2nd)/VA-72: Established 25 January 1945, disestablished 30 June 1991

Designation	Insignia	Nickname	Aircraft (Note: Where not listed in a wikipedia article, aircraft assignment was derived from "http://www.wings-aviation.ch/25-Navy-Sqn/Squadron-Basis-en.htm")	Lineage	Notes	Disestablished
1 March 1942 Designation Scheme (by Carrier Air Group)
VBF-18		Bearcats	F6F, F8F	VBF-18: 25 Jan 1945-15 Nov 1946	Bombing Fighting Squadron (Note: By 1945 VF squadrons had grown very large and they were split in two creating a second fighting squadron in each CVG which was designated a "Bombing Fighting" squadron (VBF)) of CVG-18	
15 November 1946 Designation Scheme (by Carrier Air Group with type suffix)
VF-8A		Bearcats	F8F	VF-8A: 15 Nov 1946 – 28 Jul 1948	2nd Fighting Squadron of CVAG-7	
1 September 1948 Designation Scheme (by Carrier Air Group until September 1964)
VF-72(2nd)	(Note: (1950))	Bearcats, Hawks (Note: (1950))	F8F, F9F Panther	VF-72(2nd): 28 Jul 1948 – 3 Jan 1956'	2nd Fighter Squadron of CVG-7(2nd)	
VA-72		Hawks, Blue Hawks (Note: (early 1960s))	F9F-5, A4D/A-4, A-7	VA-72: 3 Jan 1956-30 Jun 1991	Converted to a CVG-7(2nd) Attack Squadron	30 June 1991

Fighting Squadron(VF) and Bombing Fighting Squadron(VBF) of CVG-19(1st)

- VF-19(1st)/VF-19A/VF-191(1st): Established 15 August 1943, disestablished 1 March 1978

Designation	Insignia	Nickname	Aircraft (Note: Where not listed in a wikipedia article, aircraft assignment was derived from "http://www.wings-aviation.ch/25-Navy-Sqn/Squadron-Basis-en.htm")	Lineage	Notes	Disestablished
1 March 1942 Designation Scheme (by Carrier Air Group)
VF-19		Satan's Kittens	F6F	VF-19: 15 Aug 1943 – 15 Nov 1946	Fighting Squadron of CVG-19(1st)	
15 November 1946 Designation Scheme (by Carrier Air Group with type suffix)		Satan's Kittens				
VF-19A		Satan's Kittens	F6F, F8F	VF-19A: 15 Nov 1946 – 24 Aug 1948	1st Fighting Squadron of CVAG-19 (Note: On 15 Nov CVG-19 was redesignated CVAG-19 and with two fighting squadrons VF-19A and VF-20A)	
1 September 1948 Designation Scheme (by Carrier Air Group until September 1964)		Satan's Kittens				
VF-191(1st)		Satan's Kittens	F8F, F9F Panther, F9F Cougar, FJ-3, F11F, F8U/F-8, F-4	VF-191(1st): 24 Aug 1948 – 1 Mar 1978	1st Fighter Squadron of CVG-19(2nd) (Note: On 1 sep 48 CVAG-19 was redesignated CVG-19(2nd) and its VF squadrons VF-191(1st) and VF-192(1st))	1 March 1978

- VBF-19(1st)/VF-20A/VF-192(1st)/VF-114: Established 20 January 1945, disestablished 30 April 1993

Designation	Insignia	Nickname	Aircraft (Note: Where not listed in a wikipedia article, aircraft assignment was derived from "http://www.wings-aviation.ch/25-Navy-Sqn/Squadron-Basis-en.htm")	Lineage	Notes	Disestablished
1 March 1942 Designation Scheme (by Carrier Air Group)
VBF-19			F6F	VBF-19: 20 Jan 1945-15 Nov 1946	Bombing Fighting Squadron (Note: By 1945 VF squadrons had grown very large and they were split in two creating a second fighting squadron in each CVG which was designated a "Bombing Fighting" squadron (VBF)) of CVG-19(1st)	
15 November 1946 Designation Scheme (by Carrier Air Group with type suffix)
VF-20A			F6F, F4U	VF-20A: 15 Nov 1946 – 24 Aug 1948	2nd Fighting Squadron of CVAG-19	
1 September 1948 Designation Scheme (by Carrier Air Group until September 1964)
VF-192(1st)		Executioners	F4U	VF-192(1st): 24 Aug 1948 – 15 Feb 1950	2nd Fighter Squadron of CVG-19(2nd)	
VF-114	(Note: (1961))	Executioners, Aardvarks (Note: (1961))	F4U, F9F Panther, F2H, F3H, F4H/F-4, F-14	VF-114: 15 Feb 1950 – 30 Apr 1993	4th Fighter Squadron of CVG-11(2nd) (Note: Moved to CVG-11(2nd) as a fourth fighter squadron)	30 April 1993

Fighting Squadron(VF) and Bombing Fighting Squadron(VBF) of CVG-20

- VF-20/VF-8A/VF-91(1st)/VF-34(3rd)/VA-34: Established 15 October 1943, disestablished 1 June 1969

Designation	Insignia	Nickname	Aircraft (Note: Where not listed in a wikipedia article, aircraft assignment was derived from "http://www.wings-aviation.ch/25-Navy-Sqn/Squadron-Basis-en.htm")	Lineage	Notes	Disestablished
1 March 1942 Designation Scheme (by Carrier Air Group)
VF-20	(Note: New insignia approved on 1 Feb 1946)	Jokers	F6F	VF-20: 15 Oct 1943 – 15 Nov 1946	Fighting Squadron of CVG-20(1st)	
15 November 1946 Designation Scheme (by Carrier Air Group with type suffix)		Jokers				
VF-9A		Jokers	F6F, F8F	VF-9A: 15 Nov 1946 – 12 Aug 1948	1st Fighting Squadron of CVAG-9 (Note: CVG-20 redesignated CVAG-9 with two fighting squadrons, VF-9A and VF-10A)	
1 September 1948 Designation Scheme (by Carrier Air Group until September 1964)		Jokers				
VF-91(1st)		Jokers	F8F	VF-91(1st): 12 Aug 1948 – 15 Feb 1950	1st Fighter Squadron of CVG-9(2nd) (Note: On 1 sep 48 CVAG-9 was redesignated CVG-9(2nd) and its VF squadrons VF-91(1st) and VF-92(2nd))	
VF-34(3rd)		Jokers	F8F, F9F, F2H	VF-34(3rd): 15 Feb 1950 – 1 Jul 1955	4th Fighter Squadron of CVG-3(2nd) (Note: Moved to CVG-3(2nd) as a fourth fighter squadron when CVG-9(2nd) was disestablished)	
VA-34(2nd)		Blue Blasters (Note: nickname changed in 1957)	F2H, F7U, A4D/A-4	VA-34(2nd): 1 Jul 1955-1 Jun 1969	Converted to a CVG-3(2nd) Attack Squadron	1 June 1969

- VBF-20/VF-10A/VF-92(2nd)/VF-74(3rd): Established 16 April 1945, disestablished 30 April 1994

Designation	Insignia	Nickname	Aircraft (Note: Where not listed in a wikipedia article, aircraft assignment was derived from "http://www.wings-aviation.ch/25-Navy-Sqn/Squadron-Basis-en.htm")	Lineage	Notes	Disestablished
1 March 1942 Designation Scheme (by Carrier Air Group)
VBF-20			F6F	VBF-20: 16 Apr 1945-15 Nov 1946	Bombing Fighting Squadron (Note: By 1945 VF squadrons had grown very large and they were split in two creating a second fighting squadron in each CVG which was designated a "Bombing Fighting" squadron (VBF)) of CVG-20	
15 November 1946 Designation Scheme (by Carrier Air Group with type suffix)
VF-10A	(Note: Adopted in 1948)	Be-Devilers (Note: (Adopted in 1948))	F8F	VF-10A: 15 Nov 1946 – 12 Aug 1948	2nd Fighting Squadron of CVAG-9	
1 September 1948 Designation Scheme (by Carrier Air Group until September 1964)	(Note: Adopted in 1948)	Be-Devilers				
VF-92(2nd)	(Note: Adopted in 1948)	Be-Devilers	F8F	VF-92(2nd): 12 Aug 1948-15 Jan 1950	2nd Fighter Squadron of CVG-9(2nd)	
VF-74(3rd)	(Note: Adopted in 1948)	Be-Devilers	F8F, F4U, F9F-8, F4D, F4H/F-4, F-14	VF-74(3rd): 15 Jan 1950 – 30 Apr 1994	4th Fighter Squadron of CVG-7(2nd) (Note: Moved to CVG-7(2nd) as an additional fighter squadron when CVG-9(2nd) was disestablished)	30 April 1994

Fighting Squadron of CVEG-41

- VF-41(2nd)/VF-1E/VF-1(4th): Established 26 March 1945, disestablished 20 November 1948

Designation	Insignia	Nickname	Aircraft (Note: Where not listed in a wikipedia article, aircraft assignment was derived from "http://www.wings-aviation.ch/25-Navy-Sqn/Squadron-Basis-en.htm")	Lineage	Notes	Disestablished
1 March 1942 Designation Scheme (by Carrier Air Group)
VF-41(2nd)		Firebirds	F6F, FR-1 (Note: Following the disestablishment of VF-66 in October 1945 its pilots and FR-1 Fireballs were transferred to VF-41)	VF-41(2nd): 26 Mar 1945 – 15 Nov 1946	Fighting Squadron of CVEG-41 (Note: CVEG "Escort Carrier Air Group")	
15 November 1946 Designation Scheme (by Carrier Air Group with type suffix)
VF-1E		Firebirds	FR-1, F6F	VF-1E: 15 Nov 1946 – 1 Sep 1948	Fighting Squadron of CVEG-1 (Note: CVEG-41 redesignated CVEG-1 on 15 Nov 1946 with a single fighting squadron VF-1E)	
VF-1(4th)		Firebirds	F6F	VF-1(4th): 1 Sep 1948 – 20 Nov 1948	(Note: CVEG-1 was disestablished on 1 Sep 1948 and the suffix 'E' was dropped from its VF squadron's designation making it VF-1(4th). The squadron was disestablished less than three months later)	20 November 1948

Fighting Squadron of CVEG-42

- VF-42(2nd)/VF-2E/VF-81(2nd): Established 19 July 1945, disestablished 17 January 1950

Designation	Insignia	Nickname	Aircraft (Note: Where not listed in a wikipedia article, aircraft assignment was derived from "http://www.wings-aviation.ch/25-Navy-Sqn/Squadron-Basis-en.htm")	Lineage	Notes	Disestablished
1 March 1942 Designation Scheme (by Carrier Air Group)
VF-42(2nd)			F6F	VF-42(2nd) 19 Jul 1945 – 15 Nov 1946	Fighting Squadron of CVEG-42 (Note: CVEG "Escort Carrier Air Group")	
15 November 1946 Designation Scheme (by Carrier Air Group with type suffix)
VF-2E			F6F, F8F	VF-2E: 15 Nov 1946 – 15 Sep 1948	Fighting Squadron of CVEG-2 (Note: CVEG-42 redesignated CVEG-2 on 15 Nov 1946 with a single fighting squadron VF-2E)	
1 September 1948 Designation Scheme (by Carrier Air Group until September 1964)
VF-81(2nd)			F8F, F4U	VF-81(2nd): 15 Sep 1948 – 17 Jan 1950	1st Fighter Squadron of CVG-8(2nd) (Note: On 1 Sep 48 CVEG-2 was disestablished and VF-2E redesignated VF-81(2nd) for assignment to a new CVG-8, however CVG-8(2nd)'s establishment was cancelled and the squadrons programmed for it were disestablished)	17 January 1950

Fighting Squadron(VF), Bombing Fighting Squadron(VBF) and Bombing Squadron(VB) of CVBG-74

- VF-74A/VF-74(2nd)/VF-1B(3rd)/VF-21(2nd)/VA-43/VF-43(5th): Established 1 May 1945, disestablished 1 July 1994

Designation	Insignia	Nickname	Aircraft (Note: Where not listed in a wikipedia article, aircraft assignment was derived from "http://www.wings-aviation.ch/25-Navy-Sqn/Squadron-Basis-en.htm")	Lineage	Notes	Disestablished
1 March 1942 Designation Scheme (by Carrier Air Group)
VF-74A			F4U	VF-74A: 1 May 1945 – 1 Aug 1945	1st Fighting Squadron of CVBG-74 (Note: CVBG-74 established 1 May 1945 assigned to a "new" large Midway class aircraft carrier and initially assigned two VF squadrons, VF-74A and VF-74B)	
VF-74(2nd)			F4U	VF-74(2nd): 1 Aug 1945 – 15 Nov 1946	Single Fighting Squadron of CVGB-74 (Note: The air group's second VF squadron (VF-74B) was disestablished and the remaining squadron (VF-74A) was redesignated VF-74 as the single fighting squadron squadron of CVBG-74)	
15 November 1946 Designation Scheme (by Carrier Air Group with type suffix)
VF-1B(3rd)			F4U, F8F	VF-1B(3rd): 15 Nov 1946 – 1 Sep 1948	1st Fighting Squadron of CVBG-1 (Note: CVBG-74 redesignated CVBG-1 15 Nov 1946 with two fighting squadrons, VF-1B and VF-2B)	
1 September 1948 Designation Scheme (by Carrier Air Group until September 1964)
VF-21(2nd)		Mach Busters	F8F, F9F, FJ, F11F	VF-21(2nd): 1 Sep 1948 – 1 Jul 1959	1st Fighter Squadron of CVG-2(2nd) (Note: On 1 sep 48 CVBG-1 was redesignated CVG-2(2nd) and its VF squadrons VF-21(2nd) and VF-22(2nd))	
VA-43		Challengers	A4D/A-4	VA-43: 1 Jul 1959-1 Jun 1973	3rd FRS of RCVG-4 (Note: Readiness Carrier Air Group 4 (RCVG-4) was the Naval Air Force, Atlantic Fleet training air group consisting of Fleet Replacement Squadrons (FRS) which trained aircrew and maintenance personnel enroute to a fleet squadron. VA-43 was the Douglas A-4 Skyhawk FRS)	
VF-43(5th)		Challengers	T-38, F-21, F-16N, T-2	VF-43(5th): 1 Jun 1973 – 1 Jul 1994	Aggressor Squadron providing air to air combat training (Note: converted back to a fighter squadron to simulate "enemy air" tactics for air to air combat training of fleet fighter squadrons)	1 July 1994

- VBF-74A/VBF-74(2nd)/VF-2B(3rd)/VF-22(2nd): Established 1 May 1945, disestablished 6 June 1958

Designation	Insignia	Nickname	Aircraft (Note: Where not listed in a wikipedia article, aircraft assignment was derived from "http://www.wings-aviation.ch/25-Navy-Sqn/Squadron-Basis-en.htm")	Lineage	Notes	Disestablished
1 March 1942 Designation Scheme (by Carrier Air Group)
VBF-74A			F4U	VBF-74A: 1 May 1945-1 Aug 1945	1st Bombing Fighting Squadron of CVBG-74 (Note: CVBG-74 established 1 May 1945 assigned to a "new" large Midway class aircraft carrier and initially assigned two VBF squadrons, VBF-74A and VBF-74B)	
VBF-74			F4U	VBF-74: 1 Aug 1945-15 Nov 1946	Single Bombing Fighting Squadron of CVGB-74 (Note: The air group's second VBF squadron (VBF-74B) was disestablished and the remaining squadron (VBF-74A) was redesignated VBF-74 as the single bombing fighting squadron squadron of CVBG-74)	
15 November 1946 Designation Scheme (by Carrier Air Group with type suffix)
VF-2B(4th)			F4U	VF-2B(4th): 15 Nov 1946 – 1 Sep 1948	2nd Fighting Squadron of CVBG-1 (Note: CVBG-74 redesignated CVBG-1 15 Nov 1946 with two fighting squadrons, VF-1B and VF-2B)	
1 September 1948 Designation Scheme (by Carrier Air Group until September 1964)
VF-22(2nd)			F2H-2	VF-22(2nd): 1 Sep 1948 – 6 Jun 1958	2nd Fighter Squadron of CVG-2(2nd) (Note: On 1 sep 48 CVBG-1 was redesignated CVG-2(2nd) and its VF squadrons VF-21(2nd) and VF-22(2nd))	6 June 1958

- VB-74/VA-1B/VA-24/VF-24(2nd)/VF-211(3rd)/VFA-211: Established 1 May 1945, currently active as VFA-211

Designation	Insignia	Nickname	Aircraft (Note: Where not listed in a wikipedia article, aircraft assignment was derived from "http://www.wings-aviation.ch/25-Navy-Sqn/Squadron-Basis-en.htm")	Lineage	Notes	Current Designation
1 March 1942 Designation Scheme (by Carrier Air Group)
VB-74			SB2C	VB-74: 1 May 1945-15 Nov 1946	Bombing Squadron of CVBG-74	
15 November 1946 Designation Scheme (by Carrier Air Group with type suffix)
VA-1B			SB2C, AD	VA-1B: 15 Nov 1946-1 Sep 1948	1st Attack Squadron of CVBG-1 (Note: On 15 November 1946 Bombing(VB) and Torpedo(VT) squadrons which had not been disestablished were all redesignated Attack(VA) squadrons) (Note: CVBG-1 had two Attack squadrons, VA-1B and VA-2B(VA-2B had been VT-74))	
1 September 1948 Designation Scheme (by Carrier Air Group until September 1964)
VA-24			AD, F4U	VA-24: 1 Sep 1948-1 Dec 1949	1st Attack squadron of CVG-2(2nd) (Note: CVG-2(2nd) initially consisted of VF-21, VF-22, VF-23, VA-24 and VA-25)	
VF-24(2nd)		Red Checkertails	F4U, F9F, FJ-1, FJ-3, F3H, F11F, F8U	VF-24(2nd): 1 Dec 1949 – 9 Mar 1959	4th Fighter Squadron of CVG-2(2nd) (Note: VA-24 was converted to be a fourth fighter squadron in CVG-2(2nd)	
VF-211(3rd)		Checkmates	F-8U/F-8, F-14	VF-211(3rd): 9 Mar 1959-Aug 2006	1st Fighter Squadron of CVG-21(2nd) (Note: On 9 March 1959, VF-24(2nd) traded insignia, nicknames and designations with VF-211(2nd) becoming VF-211(3rd) in CVG-21(2nd) while VF-211(2nd) became VF-24(3rd) in CVG-2(2nd))	
VFA-211		Checkmates	F/A-18E	VFA-211: 1 Aug 2006–present	Redesignated Strike Fighter Sqdn with replacement of the F-14 with the F/A-18E	VFA-211

Fighting Squadron(VF) and Bombing Fighting Squadron(VBF) of CVBG-75

- VF-75A/VF-75/VF-3B(3rd)/VF-41(3rd): Established 1 June 1945, disestablished 8 June 1950

Designation	Insignia	Nickname	Aircraft (Note: Where not listed in a wikipedia article, aircraft assignment was derived from "http://www.wings-aviation.ch/25-Navy-Sqn/Squadron-Basis-en.htm")	Lineage	Notes	Disestablished
1 March 1942 Designation Scheme (by Carrier Air Group)
VF-75A		Gay Blades	F4U	VF-75A: 1 Jun 1945 – 1 Aug 1945	1st Fighting Squadron of CVBG-75 (Note: CVBG-75 established 1 June 1945 assigned to a "new" large Midway class aircraft carrier and initially assigned two VF squadrons, VF-75A and VF-75B)	
VF-75		Gay Blades	F4U	VF-75: 1 Aug 1945 – 15 Nov 1946	Single Fighting Squadron of CVGB-75 (Note: The air group's second VF squadron (VF-75B) was disestablished and the remaining squadron (VF-75A) was redesignated VF-75 as the single fighting squadron squadron of CVBG-75)	
15 November 1946 Designation Scheme (by Carrier Air Group with type suffix)
VF-3B(3rd)		Gay Blades	F4U	VF-3B(3rd): 15 Nov 1946 – 1 Sep 1948	1st Fighting Squadron of CVBG-3 (Note: CVBG-75 redesignated CVBG-3 14 Nov 1946 with two fighting squadrons, VF-3B and VF-4B)	
1 September 1948 Designation Scheme (by Carrier Air Group until September 1964)
VF-41(3rd)		Gay Blades	F4U	VF-41(3rd): 1 Sep 1948-8 Jun 1950	1st Fighter Squadron of CVG-4(2nd) (Note: On 1 sep 48 CVBG-3 was redesignated CVG-4(2nd) and its VF squadrons VF-41(3rd) and VF-42(3rd))	8 June 1950

- VBF-75A/VBF-75/VF-4B/VF-42(3rd): Established 1 June 1945, disestablished 8 June 1950

Designation	Insignia	Nickname	Aircraft (Note: Where not listed in a wikipedia article, aircraft assignment was derived from "http://www.wings-aviation.ch/25-Navy-Sqn/Squadron-Basis-en.htm")	Lineage	Notes	Disestablished
1 March 1942 Designation Scheme (by Carrier Air Group)
VBF-75A			F4U	VBF-75A: 1 Jun 1945-1 Aug 1945	1st Bombing Fighting Squadron of CVBG-75 (Note: CVBG-75 established 1 June 1945 assigned to a "new" large Midway class aircraft carrier and initially assigned two VBF squadrons, VBF-75A and VBF-75B)	
VBF-75		Green Pawns (Note: Original "Green Pawns" squadron)	F4U	VBF-75: 1 Aug 1945-15 Nov 1946	Single Bombing Fighting Squadron of CVGB-75 (Note: The air group's second VBF squadron (VBF-75B) was disestablished and the remaining squadron (VBF-75A) was redesignated VBF-75 as the single bombing fighting squadron squadron of CVBG-75)	
15 November 1946 Designation Scheme (by Carrier Air Group with type suffix)
VF-4B		Green Pawns	F4U	VF-4B: 15 Nov 1946 – 1 Sep 1948	2nd Fighting Squadron of CVBG-3 (Note: CVBG-75 redesignated CVBG-3 15 Nov 1946 with two fighting squadrons, VF-3B and VF-4B)	
1 September 1948 Designation Scheme (by Carrier Air Group until September 1964)
VF-42(3rd)		Green Pawns	F4U	VF-42(3rd): 1 Sep 1948 – 8 Jun 1950	2nd Fighter Squadron of CVG-4(2nd)	8 June 1950

Fighting Squadron(VF), Bombing Fighting Squadron(VBF) and Bombing(VB) Squadron of CVG-81

- VF-81(1st)/VF-13A/VF-131(1st)/VF-64/VF-21(3rd): Established 2 March 1944, disestablished 31 January 1996

Designation	Insignia	Nickname	Aircraft (Note: Where not listed in a wikipedia article, aircraft assignment was derived from "http://www.wings-aviation.ch/25-Navy-Sqn/Squadron-Basis-en.htm")	Lineage	Notes	Disestablished
1 March 1942 Designation Scheme (by Carrier Air Group)
VF-81(1st)		Freelancers	F6F	VF-81(1st): 2 Mar 1944 – 15 Nov 1946	Fighting Squadron of CVG-81	
15 November 1946 Designation Scheme (by Carrier Air Group with type suffix)		Freelancers				
VF-13A		Freelancers	F4U	VF-13A: 15 Nov 1946 – 2 Aug 1948	1st Fighting Squadron of CVAG-13 (Note: CVG-81 redesignated CVAG-13 with two fighting squarons, VF-13A and VF-14)	
1 September 1948 Designation Scheme (by Carrier Air Group until September 1964)		Freelancers				
VF-131(1st)		Freelancers	F4U	VF-131(1st): 2 Aug 1948 – 15 Feb 1950	1st Fighter Squadron of CVG-13(2nd) (Note: On 1 sep 48 CVAG-13 was redesignated CVG-13(2nd) and its VF squadrons VF-131(1st) and VF-132(1st))	
VF-64		Freelancers	F4U, F9F, F3H	VF-64: 15 Feb 1950 – 1 Jul 1959	4th Fighter Squadron of CVG-6(2nd) (Note: Moved to CVG-6(2nd) after CVG-13(2nd) was disestablished)	
VF-21(3rd)		Freelancers	F3H/F-3, F-4, F-14	VF-21(3rd): 1 Jul 1959 – 31 Jan 1996	1st Fighter Squadron of CVG-2(2nd) (Note: Moved to CVG-2(2nd))	31 January 1996

- VBF-81(1st)/VF-14A/VF-132(1st): Established 13 May 1945, disestablished 30 November 1949

Designation	Insignia	Nickname	Aircraft (Note: Where not listed in a wikipedia article, aircraft assignment was derived from "http://www.wings-aviation.ch/25-Navy-Sqn/Squadron-Basis-en.htm")	Lineage	Notes	Disestablished
1 March 1942 Designation Scheme (by Carrier Air Group)
VBF-81		Privateers	F4U	VBF-81: 13 May 1945-15 Nov 1946	Bombing Fighting Squadron (Note: By 1945 VF squadrons had grown very large and they were split in two creating a second fighting squadron in each CVG which was designated a "Bombing Fighting" squadron (VBF)) of CVG-81	
15 November 1946 Designation Scheme (by Carrier Air Group with type suffix)
VF-14A		Swordsmen	F4U; F8F	VF-14A: 15 Nov 1946 – 2 Aug 1948	2nd Fighting Squadron of CVAG-13	
1 September 1948 Designation Scheme (by Carrier Air Group until September 1964)
VF-132(1st)		Swordsmen	F8F	VF-132(1st): 2 Aug 1948 – 30 Nov 1949	2nd Fighter Squadron of CVG-13(2nd)	30 November 1949

- VB-81/VA-13A/VA-134(1st)/VF-174/VA-174(2nd): Established 1 March 1944, disestablished 30 June 1988

Designation	Insignia	Nickname	Aircraft (Note: Where not listed in a wikipedia article, aircraft assignment was derived from "http://www.wings-aviation.ch/25-Navy-Sqn/Squadron-Basis-en.htm")	Lineage	Notes	Disestablished
1 March 1942 Designation Scheme (by Carrier Air Group)
VB-81		Hell Razors	SBW	VB-81: 1 Mar 1944-15 Nov 1946	Bombing Squadron of CVG-81	
15 November 1946 Designation Scheme (by Carrier Air Group with type suffix)
VA-13A		Hell Razors	SBW, F4U	VA-13A: 15 Nov 1946-2 Aug 1948	1st Attack Squadron of CVAG-13(2nd) (Note: CVG-81 redesignated CVAG-13 on 15 November 1946 with two Attack Squadrons, VA-13A and VA-14A (VA-14 was formerly VT-81) (Note: On 15 November 1946 the remaining Bombing(VB) and Torpedo(VT) squadrons were redesignated Attack(VA) squadrons)	
1 September 1948 Designation Scheme (by Carrier Air Group until September 1964)
VA-134(1st)		Hell Razors	F4U	VA-134(1st): 2 Aug 1948-15 Feb 1950	1st Attack Squadron of CVG-13(2nd) (Note: CVAG-13 was redesignated CVG-13(2nd) initially with three VF squadrons VF-31, VF-32, VF-33) and two VA squadrons (VA-34 and VA-35))	
VF-174		Hell Razors	F4U, F9F-6, FJ-3, F9F-8, F8U/F-8	VF-174: 15 Feb 1950 – 1 Jul 1966	4th Fighter Squadron of CVG-17(2nd) (Note: CVG-13(2nd) was disestablished and its squadrons were redistributed to other air groups, this squadron was moved to CVG-17(2nd) as its fourth fighter squadron) (Note: In 1958 the squadron was moved to RCVG-4 (without being redesignated) and operated as a F-8 Crusader FRS from 1 May 1958 to 1 Jul 1966)	
VA-174(2nd)		Hell Razors	A-7	VA-174(2nd): 1 Jul 1966-30 Jun 1988	Converted from a F-8 FRS to an A-7 FRS	30 June 1988

Fighting Squadron(VF) and Bombing Fighting Squadron(VBF) of CVG-82

- VF-82(1st)/VF-17A/VF-171(1st): Established 11 April 1944, disestablished 15 March 1958

Designation	Insignia	Nickname	Aircraft (Note: Where not listed in a wikipedia article, aircraft assignment was derived from "http://www.wings-aviation.ch/25-Navy-Sqn/Squadron-Basis-en.htm")	Lineage	Notes	Disestablished
1 March 1942 Designation Scheme (by Carrier Air Group)
VF-82(1st)		Fighting Fools	F6F, F8F	VF-82(1st): 1 Apr 1944 – 15 Nov 1946	Fighting Squadron of CVG-82	
15 November 1946 Designation Scheme (by Carrier Air Group with type suffix)
VF-17A		Phantom Fighters	F8F, FH	VF-17A: 15 Nov 1946 – 11 Aug 1948	1st Fighting Squadron of CVAG-17 (Note: CVG-82 redesignated CVAG-17 on 15 Nov 1946 with two fighting squadrons, VF-17A and VF-18A)	
1 September 1948 Designation Scheme (by Carrier Air Group until September 1964)
VF-171(1st)		Screamin Deamons, (Note: (1949)); Aces (Note: (1953))	FH-1, F2H	VF-171(1st): 11 Aug 1948 – 15 Mar 1958	1st Fighter Squadron of CVG-17(2nd) (Note: On 1 sep 48 CVAG-17 was redesignated CVG-17(2nd) and its VF squadrons VF-171(1st) and VF-172)	15 March 1958

- VBF-82/VF-18A/VF-172/VA-172: Established 20 August 19454, disestablished 15 January 1971

Designation	Insignia	Nickname	Aircraft (Note: Where not listed in a wikipedia article, aircraft assignment was derived from "http://www.wings-aviation.ch/25-Navy-Sqn/Squadron-Basis-en.htm")	Lineage	Notes	Disestablished
1 March 1942 Designation Scheme (by Carrier Air Group)
VBF-82		Checkmates	F4U	VBF-82: 20 Aug 1945-15 Nov 1946	Bombing Fighting Squadron (Note: By 1945 VF squadrons had grown very large and they were split in two creating a second fighting squadron in each CVG which was designated a "Bombing Fighting" squadron (VBF)) of CVG-82	
15 November 1946 Designation Scheme (by Carrier Air Group with type suffix)
VF-18A		Checkmates	F4U, F8F	VF-18A: 15 Nov 1946 – 11 Aug 1948	2nd Fighting Squadron of CVAG-17	
1 September 1948 Designation Scheme (by Carrier Air Group until September 1964)
VF-172	(Note: (1950))	Checkmates, Bluebolts (Note: (1950))	F8F, FH, F2H	VF-172: 11 Aug 1948 – 1 Nov 1955	2nd Fighter Squadron of CVG-17(2nd)	
VA-172		Bluebolts	F2H, A4D/A-4	VA-172: 1 Nov 1955-15 Jan 1971	Converted to a CVG-7(2nd) Attack Squadron	15 January 1971

Fighting Squadron(VF) and Bombing Fighting Squadron(VBF) of CVG-98

- VF-98/VF-21A: Established 28 August 1944, disestablished 5 August 1947

Designation	Insignia	Nickname	Aircraft (Note: Where not listed in a wikipedia article, aircraft assignment was derived from "http://www.wings-aviation.ch/25-Navy-Sqn/Squadron-Basis-en.htm")	Lineage	Notes	Disestablished
1 March 1942 Designation Scheme (by Carrier Air Group)
VF-98			F4U	VF-98: 28 Aug 1944 – 15 Nov 1946	Fighting Squadron of CVG-98	
15 November 1946 Designation Scheme (by Carrier Air Group with type suffix)
VF-21A			F4U	VF-21A: 15 Nov 1946 – 5 Aug 1947	1st Fighting Squadron of CVAG-21 (Note: On 15 Nov 1946 CVG-98 was redesignated CVAG-21 with two fighting squadrons, VF-21A and VF-22A) (Note: CVAG-21 and its squadrons were disestablished 5 Aug 1947)	5 August 1947

- VBF-98/VF-22A: Established 1 February 1945, disestablished 5 August 1947

Designation	Insignia	Nickname	Aircraft (Note: Where not listed in a wikipedia article, aircraft assignment was derived from "http://www.wings-aviation.ch/25-Navy-Sqn/Squadron-Basis-en.htm")	Lineage	Notes	Disestablished
1 March 1942 Designation Scheme (by Carrier Air Group)
VBF-98			F4U	VBF-98: 1 Feb 1945-15 Nov 1946	Bombing Fighting Squadron (Note: By 1945 VF squadrons had grown very large and they were split in two creating a second fighting squadron in each CVG which was designated a "Bombing Fighting" squadron (VBF)) of CVG-98	
15 November 1946 Designation Scheme (by Carrier Air Group with type suffix)
VF-22A			F4U	VF-22A: 15 Nov 1946 – 5 Aug 1947	2nd Fighting Squadron of CVAG-21 (Note: CVAG-21 and its squadrons were disestablished 5 Aug 1947)	5 August 1947

Fighting Squadron(VF) and Bombing Fighting Squadron(VBF) of CVG-153

- VF-153(1st)/VF-15A/VF-151(2nd)/VF-192(2nd)/VA-192/VFA-192: Established 26 March 1945, currently active as VFA-192

Designation	Insignia	Nickname	Aircraft (Note: Where not listed in a wikipedia article, aircraft assignment was derived from "http://www.wings-aviation.ch/25-Navy-Sqn/Squadron-Basis-en.htm")	Lineage	Notes	Current Designation
1 March 1942 Designation Scheme (by Carrier Air Group)
VF-153(1st)		Fightin' Kangaroos	F6F	VF-153(1st): 26 Mar 1945 – 15 Nov 1946	Fighting Squadron of CVG-153	
15 November 1946 Designation Scheme (by Carrier Air Group with type suffix)
VF-15A		Black Knights	F6F, F8F	VF-15A: 15 Nov 1946 – 15 Jul 1948	1st Fighting Squadron of CVAG-15 (Note: CVG-153 redesignated CVAG-15 on 15 Nov 1946 with two fighting squadrons, VF-15A and VF-16A)	
1 September 1948 Designation Scheme (by Carrier Air Group until September 1964)
VF-151(2nd)		Black Knights	F8F	VF-151(2nd): 15 Jul 1948 – 15 Feb 1950	1st Fighter Squadron of CVG-15(2nd) (Note: On 1 sep 48 CVAG-15 was redesignated CVG-15(2nd) and its VF squadrons VF-151(2nd) and VF-152(1st))	
VF-192(2nd)		Black Knights, Golden Dragons (Note: (1954))	F8F, F4U, F9F Panther, F9F Cougar	VF-192(2nd): 15 Feb 1950 – 15 Mar 1956	2nd Fighter Squadron of CVG-19(2nd) (Note: Moved to CVG-19(2nd))	
VA-192		Golden Dragons	F9F Cougar, FJ-4, A4D/A-4, A-7	VA-192: 15 Mar 1956-10 Jan 1986	Converted to a CVG-19(2nd) Attack Squadron	
VFA-192		Golden Dragons	F/A-18A, F/A-18C, F/A-18E	VFA-192: 10 Jan 1985–present	Redesignated a Strike Fighter Squadron with replacement of the A-7 with the F/A-18A	VFA-192

- VBF-153/VF-16A/VF-152(2nd)/VF-54(1st)/VA-54(2nd): Established 26 March 1945, disestablished 1 April 1958

Designation	Insignia	Nickname	Aircraft (Note: Where not listed in a wikipedia article, aircraft assignment was derived from "http://www.wings-aviation.ch/25-Navy-Sqn/Squadron-Basis-en.htm")	Lineage	Notes	Disestablished
1 March 1942 Designation Scheme (by Carrier Air Group)
VBF-153		Copperheads	F6F	VBF-153: 26 Mar 1945-15 Nov 1946	Bombing Fighting Squadron (Note: By 1945 VF squadrons had grown very large and they were split in two creating a second fighting squadron in each CVG which was designated a "Bombing Fighting" squadron (VBF)) of CVG-153	
15 November 1946 Designation Scheme (by Carrier Air Group with type suffix)		Copperheads				
VF-16A		Copperheads	F6F, F8F	VF-16A: 15 Nov 1946 – 15 Jul 1948	2nd Fighting Squadron of CVAG-15	
1 September 1948 Designation Scheme (by Carrier Air Group until September 1964)		Copperheads				
VF-152(2nd)		Copperheads	F8F, F4U	VF-152(2nd): 15 Jul 1948 – 15 Feb 1950	2nd Fighter Squadron of CVG-15(2nd)	
VF-54(1st)	(Note: (1951))	Copperheads, Hell's Angels (Note: (1951))	F4U, AD	VF-54(1st): 15 Feb 1950 – 15 Jun 1956	4th Fighter Squadron of CVG-5(2nd) (Note: Moved to CVG-5(2nd) as a fourth fighter squadron when CVG-15(2nd) was disestablished)	
VA-54(2nd)		Hell's Angels	AD, F9F-8	VA-54(2nd): 15 Jun 1956-1 Apr 1958	Converted to a CVG-5(2nd) Attack Squadron	1 April 1958

=== Post-WWII: Squadrons established 1946 through 1949 ===
There were 18 squadrons established during this time period which carried the VF designation for some period during their existence. Three of these squadrons are still active today

Note: The parenthetical (1st), (2nd), (3rd) etc... appended to some designations below are not a part of the designation system. They are added to indicate that the designation was used more than once during the history of U.S. Naval Aviation and which use of the designation is indicated. Absence indicates that the designation was used only once.

In March of 1946 a Light Carrier Air Group (CVLG) was established and designated CVLG-58 along with a new Fighting squadron (VF-58). It was designated under the WWII 1 March 1942 designation scheme as it was established before 15 November 1946.

- VF-58/VF-1L: Established 15 March 1946, disestablished 20 November 1948

Designation	Insignia	Nickname	Aircraft (Note: Where not listed in a wikipedia article, aircraft assignment was derived from "http://www.wings-aviation.ch/25-Navy-Sqn/Squadron-Basis-en.htm")	Lineage	Notes	Disestablished
1 March 1942 Designation Scheme (by Carrier Air Group)
VF-58			F6F	VF-58: 15 Mar 1946 – 15 Nov 1946	Fighting Squadron of CVLG-58 (Note: CVLG "Light Carrier Air Group")	
15 November 1946 Designation Scheme (by Carrier Air Group with type suffix)
VF-1L			F6F, F8F	VF-1L: 15 Nov 1946 – 20 Nov 1948	Fighting Squadron of CVLG-1 (Note: CVLG-58 redesignated CVLG-1 15 Nov 1946 with a single fighting squadron VF-1L) (Note: CVLG-1 disestablished 1 Sep 48. VF-1L merged with the groups's Attack Squadron (VA-1L) on 20 Nov 1948 to form the second squadron designated VX-3)	20 November 1948

In April 1947 a new Escort Carrier Air Group was established and designated CVEG-3 and its fighting squadron was established as VF-3E in accordance with the designation scheme which had been implemented five months earlier on 15 November 1946.

- VF-3E/VF-82(2nd): Established 21 April 1947, disestablished 29 November 1949

Designation	Insignia	Nickname	Aircraft (Note: Where not listed in a wikipedia article, aircraft assignment was derived from "http://www.wings-aviation.ch/25-Navy-Sqn/Squadron-Basis-en.htm")	Lineage	Notes	Disestablished
15 November 1946 Designation Scheme (by Carrier Air Group with type suffix)
VF-3E			F8F	VF-3E: 21 Apr 1947 – 15 Sep 1948	Fighting Squadron of CVEG-3 (Note: CVEG "Escort Carrier Air Group")	
1 September 1948 Designation Scheme (by Carrier Air Group until September 1964)
VF-82(2nd)			F8F	VF-82(2nd): 15 Sep 1948 – 29 Nov 1949	2nd Fighter Squadron of CVG-8(2nd) (Note: On 1 Sep 48 CVEG-3 was disestablished and VF-3E was redesignated VF-82(2nd) for assignment to a new CVG-8, however CVG-8(2nd)'s establishment was cancelled and the squadrons programmed for it were disestablished)	29 November 1949

The squadrons below were established under the 1 September 1948 designation scheme. Squadrons began to be redesignated starting a few months in advance of the effective date and 14 new VF squadrons were established between July and September 1948 to increase the number of VF/VA squadrons from four per Carrier Air Group to five VF/VA per air group. Initially each CVG consisted of three VF squadrons and two VA squadrons with the VF squadrons designated VF-__1, VF-__2, and VF-__3 and the VA squadrons VA-__4 and VA-__5. Later, in 1949, the VA-__4 squadrons were redesignated to VF-__4 leaving each air group with four VF squadrons and a single VA squadron.

The eight squadrons in the table below were all established between July and October 1948 utilizing the 1 September 1948 Designation Scheme as the third fighter squadron of each Carrier Air Group. None of them were subsequently redesignated existing under only a single designation.

Designation	Insignia	Nickname	Aircraft (Note: Where not listed in a wikipedia article, aircraft assignment was derived from "http://www.wings-aviation.ch/25-Navy-Sqn/Squadron-Basis-en.htm")	Lineage	Notes	Disestablished
*VF-13(2nd)		Night Cappers	F4U, F8F, F9F, F4D, F3H/F-3, F-8	VF-13(2nd): 2 Aug 1948 – 1 Oct 1969	3rd Fighter Squadron of CVG-1(2nd)	1 October 1969
*VF-33(2nd)	(Note: (Tarsiers)) (Note: (Starfighters))	Tarsiers, (Note: (1948)); Astronauts, (Note: (1958)); Tarsiers, (Note: (1961)); Starfighters (Note: (1981))	F4U, F9F-6, FJ-3, F11F, F8U/F-8, F-4, F-14	VF-33(2nd): 12 Oct 1948 – 1 Oct 1993 (Note: This squadron existed for 45 years with no redesignations)	3rd Fighter Squadron of CVG-3(2nd)	1 October 1993
*VF-43(3rd)		Blue Pawns	F4U	VF-43(3rd): 1 Oct 1948-8 Jun 1950	3rd Fighter Squadron of CVG-4(2nd)	8 June 1950
*VF-73		Jesters	F6F, F8F, F4U, F9F-5, F9F-6, F2H, FJ-3	VF-73: 27 Jul 1948 – 1 Mar 1958	3rd Fighter Squadron of CVG-7(2nd)	1 March 1958
*VF-83(2nd)				VF-83(2nd): 15 Sep 1948-1949 or 50	3rd Fighter Squadron of CVG-8(2nd) (Note: CVG-8(2nd) establishment was cancelled and squadron was disestablished)	Late 1949 or early 1950
*VF-93(2nd)			F4U	VF-93(2nd): 12 Aug 1948 – 30 Nov 1949	3rd Fighter Squadron of CVG-9(2nd)	30 November 1949
*VF-133			F8F	VF-133: 2 Aug 1948-1949 or 1950	3rd Fighter Squadron of CVG-13(2nd) (Note: CVG-13(2nd) was disestablished 30 Nov 1949)	Late 1949 or early 1950
*VF-173		Jesters	F8F, F4U, F9F-6, FJ-3	VF-173: 11 Aug 1948 – 1 Feb 1959	3rd Fighter Squadron of CVG-17(2nd)	1 February 1959

The six squadrons below were also established and designated under the 1 September 1948 Designation Scheme as the third fighter squadron of their Carrier Air Groups but all were subsequently redesignated and each existed under multiple designations.

- VF23(2nd)/VF-151(4th)/VFA-151: Established 6 August 1948, still active as VFA-115

Designation	Insignia	Nickname	Aircraft (Note: Where not listed in a wikipedia article, aircraft assignment was derived from "http://www.wings-aviation.ch/25-Navy-Sqn/Squadron-Basis-en.htm")	Lineage	Notes	Current Designation
VF-23(2nd)		Flashers	F6F, F4U, F9F, F2H, F4D, F3H	VF-23(2nd): 6 Aug 1948 – 23 Feb 1959	3rd Fighter Squadron of CVG-2(2nd)	
VF-151(4th)		Vigilantes	F3H/F-3, F-4	VF-151(4th): 23 Feb 1959 – 1 Jun 1986	1st Fighter Squadron of CVG-15(3rd) (Note: Moved to CVG-15(3rd) as a second VF squadron after VF-151(3d), VF-152(3rd) and VF-153(3rd) all became VA squadrons in the Air Group)	
VFA-151		Vigilantes	F/A-18A, F/A-18C, F/A-18E	VFA-151: 1 Jun 1986–present	Redesignated a Strike Fighter Sqdn with replacement of the F-4 with the F/A-18C	VFA-151

- VF-53(2nd)/VF-124(2nd): Established 16 August 1948, disestablished 30 September 1994

Designation	Insignia	Nickname	Aircraft (Note: Where not listed in a wikipedia article, aircraft assignment was derived from "http://www.wings-aviation.ch/25-Navy-Sqn/Squadron-Basis-en.htm")	Lineage	Notes	Disestablished
VF-53(2nd)		Gunfighters	F4U, F9F	VF-53(2nd): 16 Aug 1948 – 11 Apr 1958	3rd Fighter Squadron of CVG-5(2nd)	
VF-124(2nd)		Gunfighters	F7U, F9F-8T/TF-9, TV-2/T-33, F8U/F-8, F-14	VF-124(2nd): 11 Apr 1958 – 30 Sep 1994	4th FRS of RCVG-12 (Note: CVG-12(2nd) was redesignated Readiness Carrier Air Group 12 (RCVG-12) on 1 Apr 1958 to operate Fleet Replacement Squadrons. VF-53(2nd) was moved to RCVG-12 redesignated as VF-124(2nd) and operated as the Pacific Fleet Fighter FRS)	30 September 1994

- VF-63/VA-63/VA-22/VFA-22: Established 28 July 1948, still active as VFA-22

Designation	Insignia	Nickname	Aircraft (Note: Where not listed in a wikipedia article, aircraft assignment was derived from "http://www.wings-aviation.ch/25-Navy-Sqn/Squadron-Basis-en.htm")	Lineage	Notes	Current Designation
VF-63		Fighting Redcocks	F8F, F4U, F9F Panther, F9F Cougar	VF-63: 28 Jul 1948-Mar 1956	3rd Fighter Squadron of CVG-6(2nd)	
VA-63		Fighting Redcocks	F9F-8, FJ-4	VA-63: Mar 1956-1 Jul 1959	Converted to an Attack Squadron (Note: VF-63 was transferred to CVG-2(2nd) in 1950 without being redesignated then was redesignated a VA squadron retaining the 63 designation while still in CVG-2(2nd). It was ultimately redesignated VA-22 in 1959 to conform with the CVG designation)	
VA-22		Fighting Redcocks	FJ-4, A4D/A-4, A-7	VA-22: 1 Jul 1959-4 May 1990	2nd Fighter or Attack Squadron of CVG-2(2nd) (Note: VF-63 had been transferred to CVG-2(2nd) in 1950 without being redesignated, then was redesignated a VA squadron retaining the 63 designation while still in CVG-2(2nd). It was ultimately redesignated VA-22 in 1959 to conform with the CVG designation)	
VFA-22		Fighting Redcocks	F/A-18A, F/A-18C, F/A-18F	VFA-22: 4 May 1990 – present	Redesignated a Strike Fighter Sqdn with replacement of the A-7 with the F/A-18C	VFA-22

- VF-113/VA-113/VFA-113: Established 15 July 1948, still active as VFA-113

Designation	Insignia	Nickname	Aircraft (Note: Where not listed in a wikipedia article, aircraft assignment was derived from "http://www.wings-aviation.ch/25-Navy-Sqn/Squadron-Basis-en.htm")	Lineage	Notes	Current Designation
VF-113		Stingers	F8F, F4U, F9F Panther, F9F Cougar	VF-113: 15 Jul 1948-Mar 1956	3rd Fighter Squadron of CVG-11(2nd)	
VA-113		Stingers	F9F-8, A4D/A-4, A-7	VA-113: Mar 1956-25 Mar 1983	Converted to a CVG-11(2nd) Attack squadron	
VFA-113		Stingers	F/A-18A, F/A-18C, F/A-18E	VFA-113: 25 Mar 1983–present	Redesignated a Strike Fighter Sqdn with replacement of the A-7 with the F/A-18C	VFA-113

- VF-153(2nd)/VF-194(1st)/VA-196: Established 15 July 1948, disestablished 21 March 1997

Designation	Insignia	Nickname	Aircraft (Note: Where not listed in a wikipedia article, aircraft assignment was derived from "http://www.wings-aviation.ch/25-Navy-Sqn/Squadron-Basis-en.htm")	Lineage	Notes	Disestablished
VF-153(2nd)		Thundercats	F8F	VF-153(2nd): 15 Jul 1948 – 15 Feb 1950	3rd Fighter Squadron of CVG-15(2nd)	
VF-194(1st)		Yellow Devils	F8F, F4U, AD	VF-194(1st): 15 Feb 1950 – 4 May 1955	4th Fighter Squadron of CVG-19(2nd) (Note: Moved to CVG-19(2nd) as its 4th fighter sqdn after CVG-15(2nd) was disestablished)	
VA-196	(Note: (1967))	Main Battery, Milestones (Note: "Milestones" name used interchangeably with "Main Battery" beginning in 1979)	AD/A-1, A-6, KA-6	VA-196: 4 May 1955-21 Mar 1997	Converted to a CVG-19(2nd) Attack Squadron	21 March 1997

- VF-193/VF-142(2nd): Established 24 August 1948, disestablished 30 April 1995

Designation	Insignia	Nickname	Aircraft (Note: Where not listed in a wikipedia article, aircraft assignment was derived from "http://www.wings-aviation.ch/25-Navy-Sqn/Squadron-Basis-en.htm")	Lineage	Notes	Disestablished
VF-193		Ghostriders	F4U, F2H, F3H/F-3, F-4	VF-193: 24 Aug 1948 – 15 Oct 1963	3rd Fighter Squadron of CVG-19(2nd)	
VF-142(2nd)		Ghostriders	F-4, F-14	VF-142(2nd): 15 Oct 1963 – 30 Apr 1995	2nd Fighter Squadron of CVG-14(2nd)	30 April 1995

The two squadrons below were established and designated under the 1 September 1948 Designation Scheme for a new CVG-21(1st) established on 15 September 1948. However CVG-21(1st) was not fully formed and it existed for only 6 months before it was disestablished on 15 March 1949 with its squadrons being disestablished soon thereafter

- VF-211(1st): Established 15 September 1948, disestablished in 1949

Designation	Insignia	Nickname	Aircraft (Note: Where not listed in a wikipedia article, aircraft assignment was derived from "http://www.wings-aviation.ch/25-Navy-Sqn/Squadron-Basis-en.htm")	Lineage	Notes	Disestablished
VF-211(1st)				VF-211(1st): 15 Sep 1948–1949	1st Fighter Squadron of CVG-21(1st)	1949 (date unknown)

- VF-212(1st): Established 15 September 1948, disestablished in 1949 or 1950

Designation	Insignia	Nickname	Aircraft (Note: Where not listed in a wikipedia article, aircraft assignment was derived from "http://www.wings-aviation.ch/25-Navy-Sqn/Squadron-Basis-en.htm")	Lineage	Notes	Disestablished
VF-212(1st)				VF-212(1st): 15 Sep 1948-1949 or 1950	2nd Fighter Squadron of CVG-21(1st)	Late 1949 or early 1950

=== 1950s: Squadrons established or activated 1950 through 1959 ===
There were 23 squadrons established plus 16 U.S. Navy Reserve squadrons activated (39 in total) during this time period which carried the VF designation for some period during their existence. Eleven of these squadrons are still active today

The 16 U.S. Navy Reserve squadrons which are listed below were all activated using their existing USNR squadron designations and all were subsequently redesignated under the 1 September 1948 designation scheme when they were later permanently activated. All regular navy squadrons established during this time period were designated under the 1 September 1948 designation scheme.

Note: The parenthetical (1st), (2nd), (3rd) etc... appended to some designations below are not a part of the designation system. They are added to indicate that the designation was used more than once during the history of U.S. Naval Aviation and which use of the designation is indicated. Absence indicates that the designation was used only once.

On 20 July 1950 eight U.S. Navy Reserve fighter squadrons were activated for service in the Korean War. Navy Reserve squadrons were designated with three digit numbers in the 600, 700, 800 and 900 series. Two Carrier Air Groups, CVG-101 (redesignated CVG-14(2nd) on 4 February 1952) and CVG-102 (redesignated CVG-12(2nd) on 4 February 1952) were established on 1 August 1959 to receive them. On 4 February 1953 all eight squadrons were permanently activated and redesignated in accordance with their carrier air group assignments.

- VF-781/VF-121: Activated 20 July 1950, disestablished 30 September 1980

Designation	Insignia	Nickname	Aircraft (Note: Where not listed in a wikipedia article, aircraft assignment was derived from "http://www.wings-aviation.ch/25-Navy-Sqn/Squadron-Basis-en.htm")	Lineage	Notes	Disestablished
VF-781		Pacemakers	F4U; F9F Panther	VF-781: 1950-4 Feb 1953	Assigned to CVG-102 (Note: CVG-102 redesignated to CVG-12(2nd) on 4 February 1952)	
VF-121		Pacemakers	F9F Panther, F9F Cougar, F3H, FJ-3, F11F, F4H/F-4	VF-121: 4 Feb 1953 – 30 Sep 1980	1st Fighter Squadron of CVG-12(2nd) (Note: Redesignated VF-121 and permanently activated on 4 February 1953. On 1 Apr 1958 CVG-12(2nd) was redesignated Readiness Carrier Air Group 12 (RCVG-12) to control Pacific Fleet Fleet Replacement Squadrons (FRS) and VF-121 became a FRS from Apr 1958 to its disestablishment)	30 September 1980

- VF-783/VF-122: Activated 20 July 1950, disestablished 10 April 1958

Designation	Insignia	Nickname	Aircraft (Note: Where not listed in a wikipedia article, aircraft assignment was derived from "http://www.wings-aviation.ch/25-Navy-Sqn/Squadron-Basis-en.htm")	Lineage	Notes	Disestablished
VF-783		Minute Men	F4U, F9F-5	VF-783: 20 Jul 1950 – 4 Feb 1953	Assigned to CVG-102 (Note: CVG-102 redesignated to CVG-12(2nd) on 4 February 1952)	
VF-122		Black Angels	F9F-5, F9F-8, F3H	VF-122: 4 Feb 1953 – 10 Apr 1958	2nd Fighter Squadron of CVG-12(2nd) (Note: Redesignated VF-122 and permanently activated on 4 February 1953)	10 April 1958

- VF-871/VF-123/VF-53(3rd)VF-143(2nd)/VFA-143: Activated 20 July 1950, still active as VFA-143

Designation	Insignia	Nickname	Aircraft (Note: Where not listed in a wikipedia article, aircraft assignment was derived from "http://www.wings-aviation.ch/25-Navy-Sqn/Squadron-Basis-en.htm")	Lineage	Notes	Current Designation
VF-871			F4U	VF-871: 20 Jul 1950 – 4 Feb 1953	Assigned to CVG-102 (Note: CVG-102 redesignated to CVG-12(2nd) on 4 February 1952)	
VF-123	(Note: (1953))	Blue Racers, Pukin' Dogs (Note: (1953))	F9F-2	VF-123: 4 Feb 1953 – 12 Apr 1958	3rd Fighter Squadron of CVG-12(2nd) (Note: Redesignated VF-123 and permanently activated on 4 February 1953)	
VF-53(3rd)		Pukin' Dogs	F3H	VF-53(3rd): 12 Apr 1958 – 20 Jun 1962	3rd Fighter Squadron of CVG-5(2nd)	
VF-143(2nd)		Pukin' Dogs	F4H/F-4, F-14	VF-143(2nd): 20 Jun 1962–2005	3rd Fighter or Attack Squadron of CVG-14(2nd)	
VFA-143		Pukin' Dogs	F/A-18E	VFA-143: 27 Apr 2006–present	Rededsignated a Strike Fighter Sqdn with replacement of the F-14 with the F/A-18E	VFA-143

- VF-874/VF-124(1st): Activated 20 July 1950, disestablished 10 April 1958

Designation	Insignia	Nickname	Aircraft (Note: Where not listed in a wikipedia article, aircraft assignment was derived from "http://www.wings-aviation.ch/25-Navy-Sqn/Squadron-Basis-en.htm")	Lineage	Notes	Disestablished
VF-874			F4U	VF-874: 20 Jul 1950 – 4 Feb 1953	Assigned to CVG-102 (Note: CVG-102 redesignated to CVG-12(2nd) on 4 February 1952)	
VF-124(1st)		Stingarees	F7U	VF-124(1st): 4 Feb 1953 – 10 Apr 1958	4th Fighter Squadron of CVG-12(2nd) (Note: Redesignated VF-124 and permanently activated on 4 February 1953)	10 April 1958

- VF-721/VF-141/VF-53(4th): Activated 20 July 1950, disestablished 29 January 1971

Designation	Insignia	Nickname	Aircraft (Note: Where not listed in a wikipedia article, aircraft assignment was derived from "http://www.wings-aviation.ch/25-Navy-Sqn/Squadron-Basis-en.htm")	Lineage	Notes	Disestablished
VF-721		Iron Angels	F9F-2	VF-721: 20 Jul 1950 – 4 Feb 1953	Assigned to CVG-101 (Note: CVG-101 redesignated to CVG-14(2nd)) 4 Feb 1952)	
VF-141		Iron Angels	F9F-2, F2H, F4D, F3H, F8U/F-8	VF-141: 4 Feb 1953 – 15 Oct 1963	1st Fighter Squadron of CVG-14(2nd) (Note: Redesignated VF-141 and permanently activated on 4 February 1953)	
VF-53(4th)		Iron Angels	F-8	VF-53(4th): 15 Oct 1963 – 29 Jan 1971	3rd Fighter or Attack Squadron of CVG-5(2nd) (Note: Moved to CVG-5(2nd) as its second VF squadron to replace VF-54(2nd) when it was moved CVG-9(3rd))	29 January 1971

- VF-791/VF-142(1st)/VF-96: Activated 20 July 1950, disestablished 1 December 1975

Designation	Insignia	Nickname	Aircraft (Note: Where not listed in a wikipedia article, aircraft assignment was derived from "http://www.wings-aviation.ch/25-Navy-Sqn/Squadron-Basis-en.htm")	Lineage	Notes	Disestablished
VF-791		Fighting Falcons	F4U; F9F-6	VF-791: 20 Jul 1950 – 4 Feb 1953	Assigned to CVG-101 (Note: CVG-101 redesignated to CVG-14(2nd)) 4 Feb 1952)	
VF-142(1st)		Fighting Falcons	F4U, F9F-6, F8U	VF-142(1st): 4 Feb 1953 – 1 Jun 1962	2nd Fighter Squadron of CVG-14(2nd) (Note: Redesignated VF-142(1st) and permanently activated on 4 February 1953)	
VF-96		Fighting Falcons	F8U/F-8, F-4	VF-96: 1 Jun 1962 – 1 Dec 1975	6th Fighter or Attack Squadron of CVG-9(3rd) (Note: Redesignated VF-96 to replace VF-92(3rd) in CVG-9(3rd) when VF-92(3rd) was moved to CVG-5(2nd))	1 December 1975

- VF-821/VF-143(1st): Activated 20 July 1950, disestablished 1 April 1958

Designation	Insignia	Nickname	Aircraft (Note: Where not listed in a wikipedia article, aircraft assignment was derived from "http://www.wings-aviation.ch/25-Navy-Sqn/Squadron-Basis-en.htm")	Lineage	Notes	Disestablished
VF-821			F4U, F9F-6	VF-821: 20 Jul 1950 – 5 Feb 1953	Assigned to CVG-101 (Note: CVG-101 redesignated to CVG-14(2nd)) 4 Feb 1952)	
VF-143(1st)		Kingpins	F9F-6, FJ-3	VF-143(1st): 4 Feb 1953 – 1 Apr 1958	3rd Fighter Squadron of CVG-14(2nd) (Note: Redesignated VF-143(1st) and permanently activated on 4 February 1953)	1 April 1958

- VF-884/VF-144/VA-52: Activated 20 July 1950, disestablished 31 March 1995

Designation	Insignia	Nickname	Aircraft (Note: Where not listed in a wikipedia article, aircraft assignment was derived from "http://www.wings-aviation.ch/25-Navy-Sqn/Squadron-Basis-en.htm")	Lineage	Notes	Disestablished
VF-884		Bitter Birds	F4U	VF-884: 20 Jul 1950 – 4 Feb 1953	Assigned to CVG-101 (Note: CVG-101 redesignated to CVG-14(2nd) on 4 February 1952)	
VF-144			F4U, F9F Panther, F9F Cougar, AD	VF-144: 4 Feb 1953 – 23 Feb 1959	4th Fighter Squadron of CVG-14(2nd) (Note: Redesignated VF-144 and permanently activated on 4 February 1953)	
VA-52		Knightriders	AD/A-1, A-6, KA-6	VA-52: 23 Feb 1959-31 Mar 1995	2nd Fighter or Attack Squadron of CVG-5(2nd) (Note: Converted to an Attack squadron and moved to CVG-5(2nd))	31 March 1995

On 1 September 1950 CVG-4(3rd) was established and four fighter squadrons designated VF-41(4th), VF-42(4th), VF-43(4th) and VF-44(2nd) were established for it.

- VF-41(4th)/VFA-41: Established 1 September 1950, still active as VFA-41

Designation	Insignia	Nickname	Aircraft (Note: Where not listed in a wikipedia article, aircraft assignment was derived from "http://www.wings-aviation.ch/25-Navy-Sqn/Squadron-Basis-en.htm")	Lineage	Notes	Current Designation
VF-41(4th)		Black Aces	F2H, F3H, F4H/F-4, F-14	VF-41(4th): on 1 Sep 1950-Dec 2001	1st Fighter Squadron of CVG-4(3rd)	
VFA-41		Black Aces	F/A-18F	VFA-41: 1 Dec 2001–present	Redesignated a Strike Fighter Sqdn with replacement of the F-14 with the F/A-18F	VFA-41

- VF-42(4th)/VA-42: Established 1 September 1950, disestablished 30 September 1994

Designation	Insignia	Nickname	Aircraft (Note: Where not listed in a wikipedia article, aircraft assignment was derived from "http://www.wings-aviation.ch/25-Navy-Sqn/Squadron-Basis-en.htm")	Lineage	Notes	Disestablished
VF-42(4th)	(Note: adopted from disestablished VF-42(3rd))	Green Pawns (Note: adopted from disestablished VF-42(3rd))	F4U, AD	VF-42(4th): 1 Sep 1950 – 1 Nov 1953	2nd Fighter Squadron of CVG-4(3rd)	
VA-42	(Note: Adopted "Thunderbolts" name and insignia from VA-176 when it was disestablished in 1992)	Green Pawns, Thunderbolts (Note: (Adopted "Thunderbolts" name and insignia from VA-176 when it was disestablished in 1992))	AD, T-28, TC-4C, A-6, KA-6	VA-42: 1 Nov 1953-30 Sep 1994	Converted to an Attack Squadron (Note: On 1 April 1958 CVG-4(3rd) was redesignated Readiness Carrier Air Group 4 (RCVG-4) to control the Atlantic Fleet FRSs. In April 1958 VA-42 became the AD Sky Raider FRS and later the A-6 FRS)	30 September 1994

- VF-43(4th)/VF-11(3rd)/VFA-11 (second and current "Red Rippers" squadron): Established 1 September 1950, still active as VFA-11

Designation	Insignia	Nickname	Aircraft (Note: Where not listed in a wikipedia article, aircraft assignment was derived from "http://www.wings-aviation.ch/25-Navy-Sqn/Squadron-Basis-en.htm")	Lineage	Notes	Current Designation
VF-43(4th)		Rebel's Raiders	F4U, F9F Cougar, F2H	VF-43(4th): 1 Sep 1950 – 16 Feb 1959	3rd Fighter Squadron of CVG-4(3rd)	
VF-11(3rd)	(Note: Adopted from disestablished VF-11(2nd)))	Red Rippers (Note: Adopted from disestablished VF-11(2nd)))	F8U/F-8, F-4, F-14	VF-11(3rd): 16 Feb 1959 – 5 Nov 2005	1st Fighter Squadron of CVG-1(2nd) (Note: Was redesignated VF-11(3rd) the day after VF-11(2nd) was disestablished and replaced VF-11(2nd) in CVG-1(2nd). Adopted the "Red Rippers" nickname and insignia becoming the second and current "Red Rippers" squadron)	
VFA-11	(Note: Adopted from disestablished VF-11(2nd)))	Red Rippers	F/A-18F	VFA-11: 18 Oct 2005–present	Redesignated a Strike Fighter Sqdn with replacement of the F-14 with the F/A-18F	VFA-11

- VF-44(2nd)/VA-44(2nd): Established 1 September 1950, disestablished 1 May 1970

Designation	Insignia	Nickname	Aircraft (Note: Where not listed in a wikipedia article, aircraft assignment was derived from "http://www.wings-aviation.ch/25-Navy-Sqn/Squadron-Basis-en.htm")	Lineage	Notes	Disestablished
VF-44(2nd)			F4U, F2H	VF-44(2nd): 1 Sep 1950 – 1 Jan 1956	4th Fighter Squadron of CVG-4(3rd)	
VA-44(2nd)		Hornets	F2H, F9F-8; F9F-8T/TF-9, TV-2, T-28, A4D/A-4, TA-4, AD/A-1	VA-44(2nd): 1 Jan 1956-1 May 1970	Converted to an Attack Squadron (Note: Transitioned from an operational Attack squadron of CVG-4(3rd) to an A4D Skyhawk FRS on 1 Jun 1958 in conjunction with CVG-4(3rd)'s redesignation to Readiness Carrier Air Group 4 (RCVG-4). In 1959 AD Sky Raider training was added and the squadron operated as both an A4D (A-4 in Sep 1962) and an AD (A-1 in Sep 1962) FRS. "Split out" VA-45(3rd) in 1963 to continue A-1 training and became solely an A-4 FRS)	1 May 1970

On 1 February 1951 eight more U.S. Navy Reserve fighter squadrons were activated for service in the Korean War. Navy Reserve squadrons were designated with three digit numbers in the 600, 700, 800 and 900 series. Two Carrier Air Groups, CVG-8(2nd) and CVG-15(3rd) were established on 9 April and 5 April 1951 to receive them. On 4 February 1953 all eight squadrons were permanently activated and redesignated in accordance with their carrier air group assignments.

- VF-671/VF-81(3rd)/VA-66(2nd): Activated 1 February 1951, disestablished 1 October 1986

Designation	Insignia	Nickname	Aircraft (Note: Where not listed in a wikipedia article, aircraft assignment was derived from "http://www.wings-aviation.ch/25-Navy-Sqn/Squadron-Basis-en.htm")	Lineage	Notes	Disestablished
VF-671		Waldomen	F4U, F8F, F9F-5	VF-671: 1 Feb 1951 – 4 Feb 1953	Assigned to CVG-8(2nd) (Note: USNR VF-671 activated 1 Feb 1951 for the Korean War and assigned to CVG-8(2nd))	
VF-81(3rd)		Waldomen	F9F-5, F7U	VF-81(3rd): 4 Feb 1953 – 1 Jul 1955	1st Fighter Squadron of CVG-81(2nd) (Note: permanently activated and redesignated on 4 February 1953)	
VA-66(2nd)		Waldomen	F7U, F9F-8, A4D/A-4, A-7	VA-66(2nd): 1 Jul 1955-1 Oct 1986	6th Fighter or Attack Squadron of CVG-6(2nd) (Note: converted to an Attack squadron, moved to CVG-6(2nd) and redesignated in accordance with the assignment to CVG-6(2nd))	1 October 1986

- VF-742/VF-82(3rd): Activated 1 February 1951, disestablished 15 April 1959

Designation	Insignia	Nickname	Aircraft (Note: Where not listed in a wikipedia article, aircraft assignment was derived from "http://www.wings-aviation.ch/25-Navy-Sqn/Squadron-Basis-en.htm")	Lineage	Notes	Disestablished
VF-742		Iron Men	F4U, F9F-5	VF-742: 2 Feb 1951 – 4 Feb 1953)	Assigned to CVG-8(2nd) (Note: USNR VF-742 activated on 2 Feb 1951 for the Korean War and assigned to CVG-8(2nd))	
VF-82(3rd)		Iron Men	F2H, F3H	VF-82(3rd): 4 Feb 1953 – 15 April 1959	2nd Fighter Squadron of CVG-8(2nd) (Note: Permanently activated and redesignated on 4 February 1953)	15 April 1959

- VF-916/VF-83(3rd)/VA-83/VFA-83: Activated 1 February 1951, still active as VFA-83

Designation	Insignia	Nickname	Aircraft (Note: Where not listed in a wikipedia article, aircraft assignment was derived from "http://www.wings-aviation.ch/25-Navy-Sqn/Squadron-Basis-en.htm")	Lineage	Notes	Current Designation
VF-916		Roaring Bulls	F4U, F8F, F9F-5	VF-916: 1 Feb 1951 – 4 Feb 1953	Assigned to CVG-8(2nd) (Note: USNR VF-916 activated on 1 Feb 1951 for the Korean War and assigned to CVG-8(2nd))	
VF-83(3rd)		Roaring Bulls	F9F-5, F7U	VF-83(3rd): 4 Feb 1953 – 1 Jul 1955	3rd Fighter Squadron of CVG-8(2nd) (Note: Permanently activated and redesignated on 4 February 1953)	
VA-83	, (Note: (1957))	Roaring Bulls, Rampagers (Note: (1957))	F7U, A4D/A-4, A-7	VA-83: 1 Jul 1955-3 Mar 1988	3rd Fighter or Attack squadron of CVG-8(2nd) (Note: Converted to a CVG-8(2nd) Attack squadron)	
VFA-83		Rampagers	F/A-18A, F/A-18C, F/A-18E	VFA-83: 1 Mar 1988–present	Redesignated a Strike Fighter Sqdn with replacement of the A-7 with the F/A-18A	VFA-83

- VF-921/VF-84(2nd)/VA-86(2nd)/VFA-86: Activated 1 February 1951, still active as VFA-83

Designation	Insignia	Nickname	Aircraft (Note: Where not listed in a wikipedia article, aircraft assignment was derived from "http://www.wings-aviation.ch/25-Navy-Sqn/Squadron-Basis-en.htm")	Lineage	Notes	Current Designation
VF-921			F4U	VF-921: 1 Feb 1951 – 4 Feb 1953	Assigned to CVG-8(2nd) (Note: USNR VF-921 activated on 1 Feb 1951 for the Korean War and assigned to CVG-8(2nd))	
VF-84(2nd)		Sidewinders (Note: (Apr 1954))	F4U, F8F, F9F-5	VF-84(2nd): 4 Feb 1953 – 1 Jul 1955	4th Fighter Squadron of CVG-8(2nd) (Note: Permanently activated and redesignated on 4 February 1953)	
VA-86(2nd)		Sidewinders	F7U, A4D/A-4, A-7	VA-86(2nd): 1 Jul 1955-15 Jul 1987	Converted to an Attack Squadron (Note: Redesignated VA-86 and temporary assigned to Air Task Group 181 (ATG-181))	
VFA-86		Sidewinders	F/A-18A, F/A-18C, F/A-18E, F-35C	VFA-86: 15 Jul 1987–present	Redesignated a Strike Fighter Squadron with replacement of the A-7 with the F/A-18A	VFA-86

- VF-653/VF-151(3rd)/VA-151/VA-23: Activated 1 February 1951, disestablished 1 April 1970

Designation	Insignia	Nickname	Aircraft (Note: Where not listed in a wikipedia article, aircraft assignment was derived from "http://www.wings-aviation.ch/25-Navy-Sqn/Squadron-Basis-en.htm")	Lineage	Notes	Disestablished
VF-653		Warrior Dragon	F4U, F9F Panther	VF-653: Dec 1949-4 Feb 1953	Assigned to Air Task Group ONE (ATG-1)	
VF-151(3rd)	(Note: adoped from VF-151(2nd))	Black Knights (Note: adoped from VF-151(2nd))	F9F-5, F7U	VF-151(3rd): 4 Feb 1953 – 7 Feb 1956	1st Fighter Squadron of CVG-15(3rd). (Note: Redesignated and permanently activated on 4 February 1953 and though it was designated as the 1st Fighter Squadron of CVG-15(3rd) it remained assigned to Air Task Group ONE (ATG-1))	
VA-151		Black Knights	F7U, F9F-8, FJ-4	VA-151: 7 Feb 1956-23 Feb 1959	Converted to an Attack Squadron (Note: Remained assigned to Air Task Group ONE (ATG-1))	
VA-23		Black Knights	FJ-4, A4D/A-4	VA-23: 23 Feb 1959-1 April 1970	3rd Fighter or Attack Squadron of CVG-2(2nd) (Note: moved and redesignated in accordance with assignment to CVG-2(2nd))	1 April 1970

- VF-713/VF-152(3rd)/VA-152: Activated 1 February 1951, disestablished 29 January 1971

Designation	Insignia	Nickname	Aircraft (Note: Where not listed in a wikipedia article, aircraft assignment was derived from "http://www.wings-aviation.ch/25-Navy-Sqn/Squadron-Basis-en.htm")	Lineage	Notes	Disestablished
VF-713		Vultures	F4U	VF-713: late 1940s-4 Feb 1953	Assigned to CVG-15(3rd) (Note: USNR VF-713 Activated on 1 Feb 1951 for the Korean War)	
VF-152(3rd)	(Note: (Adopted the flying ace insignia from disestablished VF-152(2nd) late 1953))	Vultures, Fighting Aces, (Note: (late 1953)); Friendlies (Note: (1957))	FG-1, F3H	VF-152(3rd): 4 Feb 1953 – 1 Aug 1958	2nd Fighter Squadron of CVG-15(3rd) (Note: Permanently activated and redesignated on 4 Feb 1953)	
VA-152		Friendlies, Mavericks (Note: (1968))	F2H, AD/A-1, A-4	VA-152: 1 Aug 1958-29 Jan 1971	Converted to an Attack Squadron of CVG-15(3rd) (Note: Redesignated as an Attack squadron. Assigned to Air Task Group FOUR (ATG-4) and CVG-15(3rd)/CVW-15 until 1964)	29 January 1971

- VF-718/VF-831/VF-153(3rd)/VA-153: Activated 1 February 1951, disestablished 30 September 1977

Designation	Insignia	Nickname	Aircraft (Note: Where not listed in a wikipedia article, aircraft assignment was derived from "http://www.wings-aviation.ch/25-Navy-Sqn/Squadron-Basis-en.htm")	Lineage	Notes	Disestablished
VF-831		Blue Tail Flies	F9F Panther	VF-718: est date unk-Sep 1949; VF-831: Sep 1949-4 Feb 1953	Assigned to CVG-15(3rd) (Note: USNR VF-831 activated on 1 Feb 1951 for the Korean War and assigned to CVG-15(3rd))	
VF-153(3rd)		Blue Tail Flies	F9F-5, F9F Cougar, FJ-3	VF-153(3rd): 4 Feb 1953 – 17 Dec 1956	3rd Fighter Squadron of CVG-15(3rd) (Note: Permanently activated and redesignated on 4 February 1953)	
VA-153		Blue Tail Flies	F9F-8, A4D/A-4, A-7	VA-153: 17 Dec 1956-30 Sep 1977	3rd Fighter or Attack Squadron of CVG-15(3rd) (Note: Redesignated as an Attack squadron. Assigned to CVG-15(3rd)/CVW-15 until 1969)	30 September 1977

- VF-837/VF-154/VFA-154: Activated 1 February 1951, still active as VFA-154

Designation	Insignia	Nickname	Aircraft (Note: Where not listed in a wikipedia article, aircraft assignment was derived from "http://www.wings-aviation.ch/25-Navy-Sqn/Squadron-Basis-en.htm")	Lineage	Notes	Current Designation
VF-837			F9F-2	VF-837: 1 Feb 1951 – 4 Feb 1953	Assigned to CVG-15(3rd) (Note: USNR VF-837 activated on 1 Feb 1951 for the Korean War and assigned to CVG-15(3rd))	
VF-154	(Note: (1957))	Black Knights (Note: (1957))	F9F Panther, FJ-3, F8U/F-8, F-4, F-14	VF-154: 4 Feb 1953-Oct 2003	4th Fighter Squadron of CVG-15(3rd) (Note: Permanently activated and redesignated on 4 February 1953)	
VFA-154		Black Knights	F/A-18F	VFA-154: 1 Oct 2003–present	Redesignated a Strike Fighter Sqdn with replacement of the F-14 with the F/A-18F	VFA-154

On 26 March 1952 CVG-9(3rd) was established and four fighter squadrons designated VF-91(2nd), VF-92(3rd), VF-93(3rd) and VF-94(2nd) were established for it.

- VF-91(2nd)/VF-194(3rd): Established 26 March 1952, disestablished 1 March 1978

Designation	Insignia	Nickname	Aircraft (Note: Where not listed in a wikipedia article, aircraft assignment was derived from "http://www.wings-aviation.ch/25-Navy-Sqn/Squadron-Basis-en.htm")	Lineage	Notes	Disestablished
VF-91(2nd)		Red Lightnings	F9F-2, F9F-6, FJ-3, F8U/F-8	VF-91(2nd): 26 Mar 1952 – 1 Aug 1963	1st Fighter Squadron of CVG-9(3rd)	
VF-194(3rd)		Red Lightnings	F-8, F-4	VF-194(3rd): 1 Aug 1963 – 1 Mar 1978	4th Fighter or Attack Squadron of CVG-19(2nd) (Note: Moved to CVG-19(2nd) in 1963 to replace VF-193 when it was moved to CVG-14(2nd))	1 March 1978

- VF-92(3rd)/VF-54(2nd)/VF-92(4th): Established 26 March 1952, disestablished 12 December 1975

Designation	Insignia	Nickname	Aircraft (Note: Where not listed in a wikipedia article, aircraft assignment was derived from "http://www.wings-aviation.ch/25-Navy-Sqn/Squadron-Basis-en.htm")	Lineage	Notes	Disestablished
VF-92(3rd)		Silver Kings	F4U, F9F-2, F2H, F3H	VF-92(3rd): 23 Mar 1952 – 1 Jun 1962	2nd Fighter Squadron of CVG-9(3rd)	
VF-54(2nd)		Silver Kings	F3H/F-3, F-4	VF-54(2nd): 1 Jun 1962 – 15 Oct 1963	4th Fighter Squadron of CVG-5(2nd) (Note: Moved to CVG-5(2nd) as its second VF squadron to replace VF-53(3rd) when it was moved to CVG-14(2nd))	
VF-92(4th)		Silver Kings	F-4	VF-92(4th): 1 Oct 1963 – 12 Dec 1975	2nd Fighter or Attack Squadron of CVG-9(3rd) (Note: Returned to CVG-9(3rd) from CVG-5(2nd) in Oct 1963)	12 December 1975

- VF-93(3rd)/VA-93: Established 26 March 1952, disestablished 30 August 1986

Designation	Insignia	Nickname	Aircraft (Note: Where not listed in a wikipedia article, aircraft assignment was derived from "http://www.wings-aviation.ch/25-Navy-Sqn/Squadron-Basis-en.htm")	Lineage	Notes	Disestablished
VF-93(3rd)		Blue Blazers (Note: (1954))	FG-1, F9F-2/5, F9F-8	VF-93(3rd): 26 Mar 1952 – 15 Sep 1956	3rd Fighter Squadron of CVG-9(3rd)	
VA-93	(Note: (1957)) (Note: (1965))	Blue Blazers, Ravens (Note: (1976))	A4D/A-4, A-7	VA-93: 15 Sep 1956-30 Aug 1986	Converted to a CVG-9(3rd) Attack Squadron	30 August 1986

- VF-94(2nd)/VA-94(2nd)/VFA-94: Established 26 March 1952, still active as VFA-94

Designation	Insignia	Nickname	Aircraft (Note: Where not listed in a wikipedia article, aircraft assignment was derived from "http://www.wings-aviation.ch/25-Navy-Sqn/Squadron-Basis-en.htm")	Lineage	Notes	Current Designation
VF-94(2nd)	(Note: (1955))	Tough Kitties (Note: adopted from the WWII VF-94(1st))	F4U, F9F Panther, FJ-3, F9F Cougar	VF-94(2nd): 26 Mar 1952 – 1 Aug 1958	4th Fighter Squadron of CVG-9(3rd)	
VA-94(2nd)	(Note: (1967))	Shrikes or Mighty Shrikes (Note: (1959))	FJ-4, A4D/A-4, A-7	VA-94(2nd): 1 Aug 1958-28 Jun 1990	Converted to a CVG-9(3rd) Attack Squadron	
VFA-94		Mighty Shrikes	F/A-18C, F/A-18E	VFA-94: 24 Jan 1991–present	Redesignated a Strike Fighter Squadron with replacement of the A-7 with the F/A-18C	VFA-94

On 1 May 1952 CVG-10(2nd) was established and four fighter squadrons designated VF-101, VF-102(1st), VF-103 and VF-104 were established for it.

- VF-101/VFA-101: Established 1 May 1952, deactivated 1 July 2019

Designation	Insignia	Nickname	Aircraft (Note: Where not listed in a wikipedia article, aircraft assignment was derived from "http://www.wings-aviation.ch/25-Navy-Sqn/Squadron-Basis-en.htm")	Lineage	Notes	Deactivated (Note: Chief of Naval Operations Instruction (OPNAVINST) 5030.4E dated March 1998 changed the designation system putting it in line with the system used by the USAF and USMC in that since that date U.S. Navy aircraft squadrons are no longer disestablished, they are instead "deactivated." A deactivated squadron remains in existence, though only "on paper", awaiting possible future "reactivation". Neither its designation nor any previous designations are available for use by a new squadron. A reactivated squadron would trace its lineage back to the squadron's original establishment date, including its inactive period)
VF-101	(Note: Adopted insignia from WWII VF-10)	Grim Reapers (Note: Adopted "Grim Reapers" name from WWII VF-10)	FG-1, F2H, F4D, F3H/F-3, F4H/F-4, F-14	VF-101: 1 May 1952 – 30 Sep 2005 (Note: established 1 May 1952, "deactivated" 30 Sep 2005)	1st Fighter Squadron of CVG-10(2nd) (Note: Established as one of CVG-10(2nd)'s initial squadrons, however it never deployed with CVG-10 and was moved to CVG-1 (without being redesignated) in 1954. Transferred to Readiness Carrier Air Group 4 (RCVG-4) in 1958 (without being redesignated) and operated as a FRS from Apr 1958 to 30 Sep 2005. The squadron was deactivated on 30 Sep 2005)	
VFA-101		Grim Reapers	F-35C	VFA-101: 1 May 2012 – 1 July 2019 (Note: "reactivated" 1 May 2012, "deactivated" for a second time 1 July 2019)	F-35C FRS (Note: Based at Eglin Air Force Base with the USAF 33rd Fighter Wing which was designated as a Tri-Service (USN, USMC, USAF) training wing for the USN F-35C, the USMC F-35B and the USAF F-35A. VF-101 was first deactivated on 30 Sep 2005 as an F-14 FRS then reactivated and redesignated VFA-101 as a F-35C FRS on 1 May 2012. It was deactivated a second time (as an F-35C FRS) on 1 July 2019)	1 July 2019

- VF-102(1st)/VA-36: Established 1 May 1952, deactivated 1 August 1970

Designation	Insignia	Nickname	Aircraft (Note: Where not listed in a wikipedia article, aircraft assignment was derived from "http://www.wings-aviation.ch/25-Navy-Sqn/Squadron-Basis-en.htm")	Lineage	Notes	Disestablished
VF-102(1st)			FG-1, F9F-5	VF-102(1st): 1 May 1952 – 1 Jul 1955	2nd Fighter Squadron of CVG-10(2nd)	
VA-36(1st)		Roadrunners	F9F-5, F9F-8, A4D/A-4	VF-36(1st): 1 Jul 1955-1 Aug 1970	6th Fighter or Attack Squadron of CVG-3(2nd) (Note: redesignated VA-36 and assigned to Air Task Group 201 (ATG-201). Ultimately assigned to CVG-3(2nd) in 1958)	1 August 1970

- VF-103/VFA-103 (third and current "Jolly Rogers" squadron): Established 1 May 1952, still active as VFA-103

Designation	Insignia	Nickname	Aircraft (Note: Where not listed in a wikipedia article, aircraft assignment was derived from "http://www.wings-aviation.ch/25-Navy-Sqn/Squadron-Basis-en.htm")	Lineage	Notes	Current Designation
VF-103	(Note: (Sluggers)) (Note: Jolly Rogers adopted from disestablished VF-84(3rd))	Sluggers, (Note: (1952)); Flying Cougars, (Note: (1953)); Sluggers, (Note: (1957)); Jolly Rogers (Note: (1995))	FG-1, F9F Cougar, F8U/F-8, F-4, F-14	VF-103: 1 May 1952-Feb 2005	3rd Fighter Squadron of CVG-10(2nd) (Note: This squadron is the third "Jolly Roger" squadron. The first "Jolly Roger" squadron existed from 1 January 1943 to 15 April 1959 and was designated VF-17, VF-5B(4th) and VF-61. The second existed from 1 July 1955 to 1 October 1995 and was designated VA-86(1st) and VF-84(3rd). It adopted the "Jolly Roger" name and insignia on 1 Apr 1960, a year after the original "Jolly Rogers" (VF-61) squadron was disestablished. This squadron adopted the name and insignia in 1995 after the 1 October 1995 disestablishment of the second squadron (VF-84(3rd).)	
VFA-103		Jolly Rogers	F/A-18F	VFA-103: 27 Apr 2006–present	Redesignated a Strike Fighter Sqdn with replacement of the F-14 with the F/A-18F	VFA-103

- VF-104/VA-104: Established 1 May 1952, disestablished 31 March 1959

Designation	Insignia	Nickname	Aircraft (Note: Where not listed in a wikipedia article, aircraft assignment was derived from "http://www.wings-aviation.ch/25-Navy-Sqn/Squadron-Basis-en.htm")	Lineage	Notes	Disestablished
VF-104		Hell's Archers	F4U	VF-104: 1 May 1952-4 Dec 1953	4th Fighter Squadron of CVG-10(2nd)	
VA-104		Hell's Archers	AD	VA-104: 4 Dec 1953-31 Mar 1959	Converted to an Attack Squadron of CVG-10(2nd)	31 March 1959

On 1 July 1955 CVG-21(2nd) was established and four fighter squadrons designated VF-211(2nd), VF-212(2nd), VF-213 and VF-214 were established for it.

- VF-211(2nd)/VF-24(3rd): Established June 1955, disestablished 31 August 1996

Designation	Insignia	Nickname	Aircraft (Note: Where not listed in a wikipedia article, aircraft assignment was derived from "http://www.wings-aviation.ch/25-Navy-Sqn/Squadron-Basis-en.htm")	Lineage	Notes	Disestablished
VF-211(2nd)		Checkmates	FJ-3, F8U	VF-211(2nd): Jun 1955-9 Mar 1959	1st Fighter Squadron of CVG-21(2nd)	
VF-24(3rd)		Red Checkertails, Fighting Renegades (Note: (1979))	F8U/F-8, F-14	VF-24(3rd): 9 Mar 1959 – 31 Aug 1996	4th Fighter or Attack Squadron of CVG-2(2nd) (Note: On 9 March 1959, VF-211(2nd) traded insignia, nicknames and designations with VF-24(2nd) becoming VF-24(3rd) while VF-24(2nd) became VF-211(3rd))	31 August 1996

- VF-212(2nd)/VA-212: Established 20 June 1955, disestablished 12 December 1975

Designation	Insignia	Nickname	Aircraft (Note: Where not listed in a wikipedia article, aircraft assignment was derived from "http://www.wings-aviation.ch/25-Navy-Sqn/Squadron-Basis-en.htm")	Lineage	Notes	Disestablished
VF-212(2nd)			F7U	VF-212(2nd): 20 Jun 1955 – 1 Apr 1956	2nd Fighter Squadron of CVG-21(2nd)	
VA-212		Rampant Raiders	F7U, F9F-8, FJ-4, A4D/A-4	VA-212: 1 Apr 1956-12 Dec 1975	Converted to an Attack Squadron of CVG-21(2nd)	12 December 1975

- VF-213/VFA-213: Established 22 June 1955, still active as VFA-213

Designation	Insignia	Nickname	Aircraft (Note: Where not listed in a wikipedia article, aircraft assignment was derived from "http://www.wings-aviation.ch/25-Navy-Sqn/Squadron-Basis-en.htm")	Lineage	Notes	Current Designation
VF-213		Black Lions	F2H, F4D, F3H/F-3, F-4, F-14	VF-213: 22 Jun 1955 – 2 Apr 2006	3rd Fighter Squadron of CVG-21(2nd)	
VFA-213		Black Lions	F/A-18F	VFA-213: 1 Aug 2006–present	Redesignated a Strike Fighter Sqdn with replacement of the F-14 with the F/A-18F	VFA-213

- VF-214/VA-214(2nd): Established 30 March 1955, disestablished 1 August 1958

Designation	Insignia	Nickname	Aircraft (Note: Where not listed in a wikipedia article, aircraft assignment was derived from "http://www.wings-aviation.ch/25-Navy-Sqn/Squadron-Basis-en.htm")	Lineage	Notes	Disestablished
VF-214		Volunteers	FJ-2, F9F-8	VF-214: 30 Mar 1955 – 11 Oct 1956	Fourth Fighter Squadron of CVG-21(2nd)	
VA-214(2nd)		Volunteers	F9F-8, FJ-4	VA-214(2nd): 11 Oct 1956-1 Aug 1958	Converted to an Attack Squadron (Note: Reassigned to Air Task Group FOUR (ATG-4))	1 August 1958

From mid 1948 until mid 1955 the typical CVG included five total VF/VA squadrons. By 1950 those five squadrons were usually four VF squadrons and one VA squadron. In 1955 and 1956, 17 new squadrons were established to increase the CVG from five total VF/VA squadrons to six total VF/VA squadrons with each air group usually consisting of four VF and two VA squadrons. Usually the VF squadrons were designated with the lower numbers of 1 through 4 while the VA squadrons carried the higher numbers of 5 and 6, but that was not always the case, especially later in the decade. Seven of the 17 new squadrons carried a VF designation at some point in their existence.

- VF-194: Established 18 May 1955, disestablished 10 April 1958

Designation	Insignia	Nickname	Aircraft (Note: Where not listed in a wikipedia article, aircraft assignment was derived from "http://www.wings-aviation.ch/25-Navy-Sqn/Squadron-Basis-en.htm")	Lineage	Notes	Disestablished
VF-194(2nd)		Yellow Devils	F2H	VF-194(2nd): 18 May 1955 – 10 Apr 1958	4th Fighter Squadron of CVG-19(2nd) (Note: Established to replace VF-194(1st) in CVG-19(2nd) when VF-194(1st) was redesignated VA-196)	10 April 1958

- VA-36/VF-102(2nd)/VFA-102: Established 1 July 1955, still exists as VFA-102

Designation	Insignia	Nickname	Aircraft (Note: Where not listed in a wikipedia article, aircraft assignment was derived from "http://www.wings-aviation.ch/25-Navy-Sqn/Squadron-Basis-en.htm")	Lineage	Notes	Current Designation
VA-36				VA-36: 1 Jul 1955-1 Jul 1955	Established and immediately redesignated VF-102(2nd)	
VF-102(2nd)		Diamondbacks	F2H, F4D, F4H/F-4, F-14	VF-102(2nd): 1 Jul 1955-Jan 2002	2nd Fighter Squadron of CVG-10(2nd) (Note: Established as VA-36(1st) on 1 Jul 1955 and redesignated VF-102(2nd) on the same day to replace VF-102(1st) in CVG-10(2nd) when VF-102(1st) was redesignated VA-36(1st) and moved out of CVG-10(2nd))	
VFA-102		Diamondbacks	F/A-18F	VFA-102: 1 May 2002 – present	Redesignated a Strike Fighter Sqdn with replacement of the F-14 with the F/A-18F	VFA-102

- VA-66/VF-81(4th)/VA-81/VFA-81: Established 1 July 1955, still exists as VFA-81

Designation	Insignia	Nickname	Aircraft (Note: Where not listed in a wikipedia article, aircraft assignment was derived from "http://www.wings-aviation.ch/25-Navy-Sqn/Squadron-Basis-en.htm")	Lineage	Notes	Current Designation
VA-66				VA-66: 1 Jul 1955-1 Jul 1955	Established and immediately redesignated VF-81(4th)	
VF-81(4th)		Crusaders	F9F-8	VF-81(4th): 1 Jul 1955 – 1 Jul 1959	1st Fighter Squadron of CVG-8(2nd) (Note: Established as VA-66 on 1 Jul 1955 and redesignated VF-81(4th) on the same day. Replaced VF-81(3rd) in CVG-8(2nd) when VF-81(3d) was redesignated VA-66(2nd) and moved out of CVG-8(2nd))	
VA-81	(Note: (1963))	Crusaders, Sunliners (Note: (1963))	A4D/A-4; A-7	VA-81: 1 Jul 1959-4 Feb 1988	Converted to an Attack squadron of CVG-8(2nd)	
VFA-81		Sunliners	F/A-18A, F/A-18C, F/A-18E	VFA-81: 4 Feb 1988–present	Redesignated a Strike Fighter Sqdn with replacement of the A-7 with the F/A-18A	VFA-81

- VA-86/VF-84(3rd) (second "Jolly Rogers" squadron): Established 1 July 1955, disestablished 1 Oct 1995

Designation	Insignia	Nickname	Aircraft (Note: Where not listed in a wikipedia article, aircraft assignment was derived from "http://www.wings-aviation.ch/25-Navy-Sqn/Squadron-Basis-en.htm")	Lineage	Notes	Disestablished
VA-86				VA-86: 1 Jul 1955-1 Jul 1955	Established and immediately redesignated VF-84(3rd)	
VF-84(3rd)	(Note: 1 April 1960)	Vagabonds, Jolly Rogers (Note: 1 April 1960)	FJ-3, F8U/F-8, F-4, F-14	VF-84(3rd): 1 Jul 1955 – 1 Oct 1995	4th Fighter Squadron of CVG-8(2nd) (Note: Established on 1 Jul 1955 and redesignated VF-84(3rd) on the same day. Replaced VF-84(2nd) when VF-84(2nd) was redesignated VA-86 in CVG-8(2nd)) (Note: This squadron is the second "Jolly Roger" squadron. The first "Jolly Roger" squadron existed from 1 January 1943 to 15 April 1959 and was designated VF-17, VF-5B(4th) and VF-61. This squadron existed from 1 July 1955 to 1 October 1995 and was designated VA-86(1st) for one day before being redesignated VF-84(3rd). It adopted the "Jolly Roger" name and insignia on 1 Apr 1960, a year after the original Jolly Roger (VF-61) squadron was disestablished. The third Jolly Roger squadron (VF-103) adopted the name and insignia in 1995 after the 1 October 1995 disestablishment of this squadron)	1 October 1995

- VA-106/VF-62(2nd): Established 1 July 1955, disestablished 1 Oct 1969

Designation	Insignia	Nickname	Aircraft (Note: Where not listed in a wikipedia article, aircraft assignment was derived from "http://www.wings-aviation.ch/25-Navy-Sqn/Squadron-Basis-en.htm")	Lineage	Notes	Disestablished
VA-106				VA-106: 1 Jul 1955-1 Jul 1955	Established and immediately redesignated VF-62(2nd)	
VF-62(2nd)		Boomerangs	FJ-3M, F8U/F-8	VF-62(2nd): 1 Jul 1955 – 1 Oct 1969	2nd Fighter Squadron of CVG-6(2nd) (Note: Established as VA-106 on 1 Jul 1955 and redesignated VF-62(2nd) on the same day to replace VF-62(1st) in CVG-6(2nd) when VF-62(1st) was redesignated VA-106 and moved out of CVG-6(2nd))	1 October 1969

- VA-126/VF-126: Established 6 April 1956, disestablished 1 April 1994

Designation	Insignia	Nickname	Aircraft (Note: Where not listed in a wikipedia article, aircraft assignment was derived from "http://www.wings-aviation.ch/25-Navy-Sqn/Squadron-Basis-en.htm")	Lineage	Notes	Disestablished
VA-126			F9F-8T, |F-1, T-2, A4D/A-4, TA-4	VA-126: 6 Apr 1956-15 Oct 1965	6th Fighter or Attack Squadron of CVG-12(2nd) (Note: Established as the second Attack squadron of CVG-12(2nd). Became an instrument training squadron using the F9F-8T Cougar when CVG-12(2nd) was redesignated Readiness Carrier Air Group 12 on 1 April 1958. Later became an A4D/A-4 Skyhawk FRS)	
VF-126	(Note: (1965)) (Note: (1981))	Fighting Seahawks, (Note: (1965)); Bandits (Note: (1981))	A-4, F-5, F-16N	VF-126: 15 Oct 1965 – 1 Apr 1994	Aggressor Squadron (Note: Converted from an A-4 FRS to an aggressor squadron providing air to air combat training initially using the same A-4s it had used as training aircraft when it was VA-126)	1 April 1994

- VA-156/VF-111(2nd)/VF-26(2nd)/VF-111(3rd): Established 4 June 1956, disestablished 31 March 1995

Designation	Insignia	Nickname	Aircraft (Note: Where not listed in a wikipedia article, aircraft assignment was derived from "http://www.wings-aviation.ch/25-Navy-Sqn/Squadron-Basis-en.htm")	Lineage	Notes	Disestablished
VA-156		Iron Tigers	F11F	VA-156: 4 Jun 1956-20 Jan 1959	Designated as the 6th Fighter or Attack squadron of CVG-15(3rd) (Note: Though designated as an Attack squadron of CVG-15(3rd) it was equipped with a front line fighter and it was assigned to CVG-11(2nd))	
VF-111(2nd)	(Note: Adopted from VF-111(1st))	Sundowners (Note: Adopted from VF-111(1st))	F11F, F8U/F-8	VF-111(2nd): 20 Jan 1959 – 1 Sep 1964	1st Fighter Squadron of CVG-11(2nd) (Note: When VF-111(1st) was disestablished on 19 Jan 1959, VA-156 which was also assigned to CVG-11(2nd) and flew fighters was redesignated VF-111(2nd) replacing it and finally matching its designation to its CVG assignment and role. It adopted the "Sundowners" name and insignia becoming the second VF-111 Sundowners squadron)	
VF-26(2nd)	(Note: Adopted from VF-111(1st))	Sundowners	F-8	VF-26(2nd): 1 Sep 1964 – 17 Sep 1964	6th Fighter or Attack Squadron of CVG-2(2nd) (Note: Redesignated for assignment to CVG-2(2nd), but remained designated as such for only 16 days before being redesignated back to VF-111)	
VF-111(3rd)	(Note: Adopted from VF-111(1st))	Sundowners	F-8, F-4, F-14	VF-111(3rd): 17 Sep 1964 – 31 Mar 1995	Designated as the 1st Fighter Squadron of CVG-11(2nd) (Note: After being redesignated VF-111(3rd) it was moved to CVG-2(2nd) retaining the VF-111 designation. These series of redesignations of VF-111 to VF-26 and back to VF-111 were the last redesignations to occur due to movement between Carrier Air Wings (Carrier Air Groups had been renamed Carrier Air Wings on 20 December 1963) with all squadron designations "frozen" from this time on regardless of Carrier Air Wing assignment)	31 March 1995

=== 1960 to present: Squadrons established 1960 and later ===
There were 14 squadrons established during this time period which carried the VF designation for some period during their existence. One of these squadrons is still active today

Squadrons continued to be established under the rules of the 1 September 1948 designation scheme until 1963 when the last squadron to be designated under that scheme was established.

In September 1960 two new fighter squadrons were established for the newly established CVG-16 (2nd). By this time the typical CVG included two Fighter (VF) squadrons and three Attack (VA) squadrons.

- VF-161/VFA-161: Established 1 September 1960, disestablished 1 April 1988.

Designation	Insignia	Nickname	Aircraft (Note: Where not listed in a wikipedia article, aircraft assignment was derived from "http://www.wings-aviation.ch/25-Navy-Sqn/Squadron-Basis-en.htm")	Lineage	Notes	Disestablished
VF-161		Chargers	F3H/F-3, F-4	VF-161: 1 Sep 1960 – 1 Jun 1986	1st Fighter Squadron of CVG-16(2nd)	
VFA-161		Chargers	F/A-18A	VFA-161: 1 Jun 1986-1 Apr 1988	Redesignated a Strike Fighter Sqdn with replacement of the F-4 with the F/A-18A	1 April 1988

- VF-162: Established 1 September 1960, disestablished 29 January 1971

Designation	Insignia	Nickname	Aircraft (Note: Where not listed in a wikipedia article, aircraft assignment was derived from "http://www.wings-aviation.ch/25-Navy-Sqn/Squadron-Basis-en.htm")	Lineage	Notes	Disestablished
VF-162		Hunters	F4D/F-6, F-8	VF-162: 1 Sep 1960 – 29 Jan 1971	2nd Fighter Squadron of CVG-16(2nd)	29 January 1971

In August 1961 two new fighter squadrons were established for the newly established CVG-13 (3rd). By this time the typical CVG included two Fighter (VF) squadrons and three Attack (VA) squadrons. The air group and its squadrons were sort-lived being disestablished only a year later.

- VF-131(2nd): Established 21 August 1961, disestablished 1 October 1962

Designation	Insignia	Nickname	Aircraft (Note: Where not listed in a wikipedia article, aircraft assignment was derived from "http://www.wings-aviation.ch/25-Navy-Sqn/Squadron-Basis-en.htm")	Lineage	Notes	Disestablished
VF-131(2nd)		Nightcappers	F3H	VF-131(2nd): 21 Aug 1961 – 1 Oct 1962	1st Fighter Squadron of CVG-13(3rd)	1 October 1962

- VF-132(2nd): Established 31 August 1961, disestablished 1 October 1962

Designation	Insignia	Nickname	Aircraft (Note: Where not listed in a wikipedia article, aircraft assignment was derived from "http://www.wings-aviation.ch/25-Navy-Sqn/Squadron-Basis-en.htm")	Lineage	Notes	Disestablished
VF-132(2nd)	(Note: adopted from disestablished VF-132(1st))	Swordsmen (Note: adopted from disestablished VF-132(1st))	F8U/F-8	VF-132(2nd): 31 Aug 1961 – 1 Oct 1962	2nd Fighter Squadron of CVG-13(3rd)	1 October 1962

In 1963 an Attack (VA) Fleet Replacement Squadron of Readiness Carrier Air Group 4 (RCVG-4) was established. In 1985 it was redesignated a Fighter (VF) squadron which operated in an aggressor role providing air to air combat training for fleet fighter squadrons.

- VA-45(3rd)/VF-45(2nd): Established 15 February 1963, disestablished 31 March 1996

Designation	Insignia	Nickname	Aircraft (Note: Where not listed in a wikipedia article, aircraft assignment was derived from "http://www.wings-aviation.ch/25-Navy-Sqn/Squadron-Basis-en.htm")	Lineage	Notes	Disestablished
VA-45(3rd)	(Note: Adopted both the "Blackbirds" name and the insignia of the disestablished VA-45(2nd))	Blackbirds	A-1, A-4	VA-45(3rd): 15 Feb 1963-7 Feb 1985	5th FRS of RCVG-4 (Note: Established as an A-1 Sky Raider FRS and assigned to RCVG-4 (was "split out of" VA-44(2nd) to continue A-1 training to allow VA-44(2nd) to become solely an A-4 FRS). After the A-1's retirement the squadron provided A-4 detachments to ASW air groups and later assumed an adversary role in support of Air Combat Maneuvering training)	
VF-45(2nd)		Blackbirds	TA-4, F5N, F-16N	VF-45(2nd): 7 Feb 1985 – 31 Mar 1996	Converted to a Fighter Squadron (Note: Operated as an "aggressor" squadron providing air to air combat training for fleet fighter squarons)	31 March 1996

The designation scheme of 1 September 1948 which required redesignation when moving from one Carrier Air Group (Carrier Air Wing after 20 December 1963) to another began to be abandoned in the late 1950s when squadrons moving between CVGs were redesignated in most cases but not always in every case. In September 1964 the last squadron redesignation due to Carrier Air Wing reassignment occurred and all squadron designations were frozen and no longer determined by Carrier Air Wing assignment from that time on.

Squadrons established after 1963 were designated using designations of historical squadrons which were of significance to the designating authority for one reason or another.

- VF-1(5th): Established 14 October 1972, disestablished 30 September 1993. VF-1 and VF-2 were established in 1972 as the first two F-14 operational squadrons.

Designation	Insignia	Nickname	Aircraft (Note: Where not listed in a wikipedia article, aircraft assignment was derived from "http://www.wings-aviation.ch/25-Navy-Sqn/Squadron-Basis-en.htm")	Lineage	Notes	Disestablished
VF-1(5th)		Wolfpack	F-14	VF-1(5th): 14 Oct 1972 – 30 Sep 1993	One of two squadrons established to be the first to operationally fly the new F-14A Tomcat	30 September 1993

- VF-2(5th)/VFA-2: Established 14 October 1972, still active as VFA-2.

Designation	Insignia	Nickname	Aircraft (Note: Where not listed in a wikipedia article, aircraft assignment was derived from "http://www.wings-aviation.ch/25-Navy-Sqn/Squadron-Basis-en.htm")	Lineage	Notes	Current Designation
VF-2(5th)	(Note: Based on the original VF-2(1st) of 1922-1927 insignia)	Bounty Hunters	F-14	VF-2(5th): 14 October 1972 – 1 Jul 2003	One of two squadrons established to be the first to operationally fly the new F-14A Tomcat	
VFA-2	(Note: Based on the original VF-2(1st) of 1922-1927 insignia)	Bounty Hunters	F/A-18F	VFA-2: 21 Jul 2003–present	Redesignated a Strike Fighter Sqdn with replacement of the F-14 with the F/A-18F	VFA-2

- VF-171(2nd): Established 8 August 1977, disestablished 1 June 1994. Established as a F-4 Phantom FRS and commemorated a squadron which had existed from 1944 to 1958 that had been the first to fly the original "Phantom" aircraft, the McDonnell FH Phantom.

Designation	Insignia	Nickname	Aircraft (Note: Where not listed in a wikipedia article, aircraft assignment was derived from "http://www.wings-aviation.ch/25-Navy-Sqn/Squadron-Basis-en.htm")	Lineage	Notes	Disestablished
VF-171(2nd)	(Note: Based on the insignia of VF-171(1st) which was disestablished in 1958)	Aces (Note: (adopted from VF-171(1st)))	F-4	VF-171(2nd): 8 Aug 1977 – 1 Jun 1984	F-4 "Phantom" FRS (Note: Was "split out of" VF-101 to continue F-4 training when VF-101 transitioned to F-14 training)	1 June 1984

In December 1986 two new fighter squadrons were established for the newly established CVW-10(2nd). The air wing and its squadrons were sort-lived being disestablished a little under a year and a half later.

- VF-191(2nd): Established 1 December 1986, disestablished 30 April 1988. Commemorated the WWII VF-19 "Satans Kittens" which was disestablished in 1978 as the original VF-191(1st).

Designation	Insignia	Nickname	Aircraft (Note: Where not listed in a wikipedia article, aircraft assignment was derived from "http://www.wings-aviation.ch/25-Navy-Sqn/Squadron-Basis-en.htm")	Lineage	Notes	Disestablished
VF-191(2nd)	(Note: Adopted name and insignia of the disestablished VF-191(1st))	Satan's Kittens	F-14	VF-191(2nd): 1 Dec 1986 – 30 Apr 1988	One of two fighter squadrons of CVW-10(2nd)	30 April 1988

- VF-194(4th): Established 1 December 1986, disestablished 30 April 1988. Commemorated the three past squadrons which had been designated VF-194, the first of which had been established in 1948 as VF-153(2nd) and the last of which had been disestablished in 1978.

Designation	Insignia	Nickname	Aircraft (Note: Where not listed in a wikipedia article, aircraft assignment was derived from "http://www.wings-aviation.ch/25-Navy-Sqn/Squadron-Basis-en.htm")	Lineage	Notes	Disestablished
VF-194(4th)	(Note: Name and insignia adopted from VF-194(3rd))	Red Lightnings	F-14	VF-194(4th): 1 Dec 1986 – 30 Apr 1988	One of two fighter squadrons of CVW-10(2nd)	30 April 1988

Though the designation of squadrons according to Carrier Air Wing assignment ceased in 1964, when the U.S. Navy Reserve established two Reserve Carrier Air Wings in 1970 it used that old system to designate the squadrons it established for its two Carrier Air Wings.

Reserve Carrier Air Wing TWENTY (CVWR-20) was established in 1970 with two VF squadrons.

- VF-201/VFA-201(2nd): Established 25 July 1970, deactivated 30 June 2007

Designation	Insignia	Nickname	Aircraft (Note: Where not listed in a wikipedia article, aircraft assignment was derived from "http://www.wings-aviation.ch/25-Navy-Sqn/Squadron-Basis-en.htm")	Lineage	Notes	Deactivated (Note: Chief of Naval Operations Instruction (OPNAVINST) 5030.4E dated March 1998 changed the designation system putting it in line with the system used by the USAF and USMC in that since that date U.S. Navy aircraft squadrons are no longer disestablished, they are instead "deactivated." A deactivated squadron remains in existence, though only "on paper", awaiting possible future "reactivation". Neither its designation nor any previous designations are available for use by a new squadron. A reactivated squadron would trace its lineage back to the squadron's original establishment date, including its inactive period)
VF-201		Hunters	F-8, F-4, F-14	VF-201: 25 Jul 1970-Jan 1999	USNR squadron. 1st Fighter Squadron of CVWR-20	
VFA-201		Hunters	F/A-18A	VFA-201: 1 Jan 1999-30 June 2007 (Note: inactive 30 June 2007 to present)	USNR squadron. Redesignated a Strike Fighter Sqdn with replacement of the F-14 with the F/A-18A	30 June 2007

- VF-202: Established 1 July 1970, disestablished 31 December 1994

Designation	Insignia	Nickname	Aircraft (Note: Where not listed in a wikipedia article, aircraft assignment was derived from "http://www.wings-aviation.ch/25-Navy-Sqn/Squadron-Basis-en.htm")	Lineage	Notes	Disestablished
VF-202		Superheats	F-8, F-4, F-14	VF-202: 1 Jul 1970 – 31 Dec 1994	USNR squadron. 2nd Fighter Squadron of CVWR-20	31 December 1994

Reserve Carrier Air Wing thirty (CVWR-30) was established in 1970 with two VF squadrons.

- VF-301(2nd): Established 1 October 1970, disestablished 31 December 1994

Designation	Insignia	Nickname	Aircraft (Note: Where not listed in a wikipedia article, aircraft assignment was derived from "http://www.wings-aviation.ch/25-Navy-Sqn/Squadron-Basis-en.htm")	Lineage	Notes	Disestablished
VF-301(2nd)		Devil's Disciples	F-8, F-4, F-14	VF-301(2nd): 1 Oct 1970 – 31 Dec 1994	USNR squadron. 1st Fighter Squadron of CVWR-30	31 December 1994

- VF-302(2nd): Established 21 May 1971, disestablished 31 December 1994

Designation	Insignia	Nickname	Aircraft (Note: Where not listed in a wikipedia article, aircraft assignment was derived from "http://www.wings-aviation.ch/25-Navy-Sqn/Squadron-Basis-en.htm")	Lineage	Notes	Disestablished
VF-302(2nd)		Stallions	F-8, F-4, F-14	VF-302(2nd): 21 May 1971 – 31 Dec 1994	USNR squadron. 2nd Fighter Squadron of CVWR-30	31 December 1994

== See also ==
- List of inactive United States Navy aircraft squadrons
- List of United States Navy aircraft squadrons
- List of United States Navy aircraft wings
- Naval aviation
- Modern US Navy carrier air operations
- List of United States Navy aircraft designations (pre-1962) / List of US Naval aircraft
- United States Naval Aviator
- Naval Flight Officer
- United States Marine Corps Aviation
- Military aviation

== Bibliography ==
- Dictionary of American Naval Aviation Squadrons
- Grossnick, Roy A. (1995). Dictionary of American Naval Aviation Squadrons Volume 1 - The History of VA, VAH, VAK, VAL, VAP and VFA Squadrons. Naval Historic Center, Department of the Navy. ISBN 0-945274-29-7.
- Roberts, Michael D. (2000). Dictionary of American Naval Aviation Squadrons Volume 2 T- The History of VP, VPB, VP(HL) and VP(AM) Squadrons. Naval Historic Center, Department of the Navy. Archived from the original on 15 September 2008.
