= Top Shot season 4 =

Top Shot
- Season 4
- Region 1 DVD cover
- No. of episodes: 12

Release
- Original network: History
- Original release: February 14 – May 1, 2012

Season chronology
- ← Previous; Season 3 Next → Season 5

The fourth season of the History channel television series Top Shot premiered on February 14, 2012.

The season contains twelve episodes, and was filmed in Santa Clarita, California. The season was won by Chris Cheng.

Gregory Littlejohn, Kyle Sumpter, Chee Kwan, William Bethards, and Gabby Franco returned for Top Shot: All-Stars. Littlejohn finished in 16th, Kwan finished in 14th, Sumpter finished in 13th, Franco finished in 12th, and Bethards finished in 5th, meaning that Season 4 was the only season without a representative in the finale.

== Contestants ==
Contestant	Occupation/Background	Original Team	Merged Team	Eliminated
Craig Buckland; 47, Sandisfield, MA	Chemist, National and International Competitive Shooter, 3x World Champion and 4x National Champion, IDPA 5-Gun Master	None		18th Place
Forrest McCord; 21, Houston, TX	Kinesiology Student, World Champion Pistol Shooter, Former U.S. Junior Shooting Team Member, IPSC World Shoot Gold Medalist, USPSA Competitive Shooter	None		17th Place
Frank Melloni; 28, Middle Island, NY	High School Custodian, Self-Taught Shooter, World War II Firearms Collector	Blue Team		16th Place
Keith Gibson; 28, Ghent, NY	Grass-Fed Cattle Farmer, Former U.S. National Guard Combat Medic, Former U.S. Army Veteran, Junior Olympic Shooting Camp Member, Army Basic Rifle Marksmanship Award Winner, Private Pistol Instructor, IDPA Shooter	Red Team		15th Place
Michelle Viscusi; 21, Gilbert, AZ	Military Police Officer/Border Patrol, Former Army National Guardsman, Weapons Accessories Company Model	Blue Team		14th Place
Colin Gallagher; 35, Wichita, KS	Police Sergeant, New Recruit Weapons Trainer, Criminal Profiling Training	Blue Team		13th Place
Eric "Iggy" Keyes; 39, Chicago, IL	Police Officer, Former Homicide and Narcotics Detective, Former SWAT Team Member, Skilled Pistol and Rifle Shooter, Weightlifter	Red Team		12th Place
Tim Trefren; 34, Thayne, WY	Professional Big Game Guide, Business Owner, Bow Hunter, Skilled Archer, 2x World Champion Moose Caller	Red Team		11th Place
Dylan Fletcher; 30, Alpharetta, GA	Knife Maker, Businessman/Entrepreneur, Skilled Knife Thrower, Pistol and Rifle Shooter	Blue Team		10th Place
Terry Vaughan; 40, London, UK	Professional Speaker for Personal Safety, NRA Pistol Instructor, Former British Royal Marine Commando	Blue Team		9th Place
Gabby Franco; 30, Doral, FL	Firearms Instructor/Business Owner, Former Venezuelan Shooting Team Member and Olympian, Pan American Games Silver Medalist, South American Games Gold Medalist, Tactical and IPSC Competitive Shooter	Red Team	Green Team	8th Place
William Bethards; 47, Fredericksburg, VA	FBI Law Enforcement Specialist/Firearms Instructor, Former Marine, Marine Corps Shooting Team Member and Coach, Ex-Virginia State Trooper, National and State 3-gun Competitive Shooter, Gold Lauchheimer Trophy Winner, FBI Shooting Team National Record Holder in 3-gun	Blue Team	Green Team	7th Place
Chee Kwan; 23, San Gabriel, CA	Range Master, State Certified Firearms Instructor, Former Marine Infantryman, Recreational Shooter, 3x Rifle and Pistol Expert	Red Team	Green Team	6th Place
Kyle Sumpter; 50, Kent, WA	Police Commander, Former SWAT Team Member, Washington State IDPA and Steel Championship Winner	Red Team	Green Team	5th Place
Augie Malekovich; 34, Belle Vernon, PA	Financial Advisor, Former Department of Homeland Security Agent, Former Marine, Triple Nickel Award Winner	Blue Team	Green Team	4th Place
Gary Shank; 28, Reno, NV	Firearms Instructor, Civil War Reenactor, Historical Firearms Appraiser, Former Gun Library Manager, Local ISPA and USPSA Shooter, Cowboy Action 3-Gun Competitor	Red Team	Green Team	3rd Place
Gregory Littlejohn; 31, Waterloo, IL	Federal Police Officer, USAF Veteran, Former Air Force Security Forces Member, World Champion Grenadier, ISPC Shooter	Blue Team	Green Team	2nd Place
Chris Cheng; 31, Mission Viejo, CA	IT Professional, Firearm Enthusiast, Skilled Pistol, Rifle and Shotgun Shooter. Self-taught.	Red Team	Green Team	Winner

== Contestant progress ==
#	Contestant	Episodes													
#	Contestant	1	2	3	4	5	6	7	8	9	10	11	12		
1	Chris	WIN	SAFE	WIN	WIN	SAFE	NOM	WIN	WIN	NOM	WIN	SAFE	WIN	WIN	TOP SHOT
2	Gregory	NOM	WIN	SAFE	NOM	WIN	WIN	SAFE	NOM	SAFE	SAFE	WIN	BTM2	SAFE	SECOND PLACE
3	Gary	WIN	SAFE	WIN	WIN	SAFE	SAFE	WIN	WIN	SAFE	NOM	SAFE	WIN	OUT	
4	Augie	SAFE	WIN	SAFE	SAFE	WIN	WIN	SAFE	SAFE	WIN	SAFE	NOM	OUT		
5	Kyle	WIN	NOM	WIN	WIN	SAFE	SAFE	WIN	WIN	SAFE	SAFE	OUT			
6	Chee	WIN	SAFE	WIN	WIN	SAFE	SAFE	WIN	WIN	SAFE	OUT				
7	William	SAFE	WIN	SAFE	SAFE	WIN	WIN	NOM	SAFE	OUT					
8	Gabby	WIN	SAFE	WIN	WIN	SAFE	SAFE	WIN	WIN	OUT					
9	Terry	SAFE	WIN	NOM	SAFE	WIN	WIN	SAFE	OUT						
10	Dylan	SAFE	WIN	SAFE	SAFE	WIN	WIN	OUT							
11	Tim	WIN	SAFE	WIN	WIN	NOM	OUT								
12	Iggy	WIN	SAFE	WIN	WIN	OUT									
13	Colin	SAFE	WIN	SAFE	OUT										
14	Michelle	SAFE	WIN	OUT											
15	Keith	WIN	OUT												
16	Frank	OUT													
17	Forrest	OUT													
18	Craig	OUT													

The player's team won the team challenge (Episodes 1 - 8)
The player(s) won an individual challenge, or placed high enough to earn immunity from elimination for the current round (Episodes 9 - 11); the player(s) won an elimination challenge to avoid elimination (Episode 12)
The player's team lost the team challenge, but the player was not nominated for elimination (Episodes 1 - 8); the player(s) lost an individual challenge, but was not nominated for elimination (Episode 9 - 11)
The player was nominated for elimination, but won an elimination challenge (Episodes 1 - 11); the player was in the bottom two shooters, but won an elimination challenge (Episode 12)
The player lost an elimination challenge and was eliminated
The player(s) was eliminated in the preliminary challenge of Episode 1
The player came in second in the final challenge
The player won the $100,000 grand prize and the title of Top Shot in the final challenge

== Episodes ==
=== Episode 1: "Sweating Bullets" ===
Premiere date	Preliminary challenge weapon(s)	Preliminary challenge	Blue Team members	Red Team members	Eliminated players
February 14, 2012	M14 rifle	Fire one shot at a target from 200 yards. Players are ranked by distance to the center of the bullseye; odd and even ranks join the Blue and Red Teams, respectively. The two farthest shots are eliminated.	Augie, Dylan, Gregory, Colin, Terry, Michelle, Frank, William	Chee, Tim, Keith, Chris, Gary, Kyle, Gabby, Iggy	Craig, Forrest
February 14, 2012	Team challenge weapon(s)	Team challenge		Benched player(s)	Winning team
February 14, 2012	Ruger Vaquero revolver	"The Perfect Run Challenge": From 35 feet, shooters fire at separate grids of 48 targets (8 rows of 6). Target size decreases from 10" at the top to 4.5" at the bottom. One shooter per row; all 6 targets on a row must be shot without a miss to eliminate it. First team to eliminate all 8 rows wins.		N/A	Red Team
February 14, 2012	Elimination challenge weapon(s)	Elimination challenge		Nominated players	Eliminated player
February 14, 2012	M1 carbine	"Sidecar Shootout Challenge": While riding in a motorcycle sidecar, fire at 10 targets from 15-25 yards. Maximum 15 rounds per player. Higher number of hits wins; ties are broken by fewer total rounds fired.		Gregory, Frank	Frank (Note: Frank and Gregory each hit 6 targets, but Gregory won because he fired 10 rounds as opposed to Frank's 15.)

No practice sessions were held for the preliminary and team challenges. The trainer for the elimination challenge was Garry James, historical firearms expert and former United States Army ordnance officer.

=== Episode 2: "In the Trenches" ===
Premiere date	Team challenge weapon(s)	Team challenge	Benched player(s)	Winning team
February 21, 2012	M1918A1 Browning Automatic Rifle (Note: The Browning Automatic Rifle (B.A.R.) was designed for advancing infantrymen to sling over the shoulder and fire from the hip, a technique called "walking fire".)	"In the Trenches Challenge": Crawl through sand under 40 feet of barbed wire, then jump into a trench and fire at separate sets of 7 targets from 100-150 yards. One shooter per target; the next shooter cannot start onto the course until the current target has been hit. First team to hit all targets wins.	Chee	Blue Team
February 21, 2012	Elimination challenge weapon(s)	Elimination challenge	Nominated for elimination	Eliminated player
February 21, 2012	Milkor USA M32A1 grenade launcher (Note: The Milkor USA M32A1 MSGL can fire a variety of rounds like parachuting video camera, infra-red flares, and smoke or flash-bang rounds.)	"Capture the Frag Challenge": Fire at separate sets of 4 targets each from 50-75 yards, starting with the closest. First to hit all targets wins.	Keith, Kyle	Keith

The trainer for both challenges was Craig "Sawman" Sawyer, Navy SEALs instructor and former sniper.

=== Episode 3: "Shotgun Showdown" ===
Premiere date	Team challenge weapon(s)	Team challenge	Benched player(s)	Winning team
February 28, 2012	Benelli M4 shotgun, loaded with slugs Benelli Vinci shotgun, loaded with birdshot	"Double Tap Challenge": Teams compete separately, with one shooter at a time per weapon. The M4 shooter must hit an 8" moving target to launch two clay targets for the Vinci shooter. Each shooter then goes to the back of the line for the weapon he/she did not use. One point per clay hit; higher score after 4 minutes wins.	N/A	Red Team
February 28, 2012	Elimination challenge weapon(s)	Elimination challenge	Nominated for elimination	Eliminated player
February 28, 2012	Benelli Nova shotgun	"Horse Race Challenge": From 35 feet, shooters fire buckshot loads at separate 3-target wheels to make them roll along 35-foot tracks. Once a shooter's wheel passes a marker on the track, he/she may switch to slugs. First shooter to get his/her wheel to the other end wins.	Terry, Michelle	Michelle

The trainer for the team challenge was Chris Reed, the winner of Season 2. The trainer for the elimination challenge was Taran Butler, national/world shotgun champion.

=== Episode 4: "Crossbow Crossfire" ===
Premiere date	Team challenge weapon(s)	Team challenge	Benched player(s)	Winning team
March 6, 2012	BowTech StrykeZone 350 crossbow	"Crossbow Shootout Challenge": From 20 yards, pairs of shooters (one per team) fire at separate sets of 8" targets on rotating wheels. Six rounds are played; one target each in Round 1, with another target added in each successive round. One point per target hit; a round ends as soon as one shooter has hit all of his/her targets. Higher total score wins.	Tim	Red Team
March 6, 2012	Elimination challenge weapon(s)	Elimination challenge	Nominated for elimination	Eliminated player
March 6, 2012	Smith & Wesson M&P 40 pistol (Note: The M&P 40 has a low slide profile which holds the barrel axis close to the shooter's hand and reduces muzzle rise, allowing for faster subsequent shots.)	"Tick Tock Challenge": From 35 feet, shooters fire at targets on opposite sides of separate walls, causing a pendulum with 10 balloon targets to swing through a triangular opening. Balloons range from 8" at the bottom to 3.5" at the top. First to hit all 10 balloons wins.	Greg, Colin	Colin

The trainer for the team challenge was Chris Brackett, archery expert. The trainer for the elimination challenge was Julie Golob, national/world pistol champion.

=== Episode 5: "Swing Into Action" ===
Premiere date	Team challenge weapon(s)	Team challenge	Benched player(s)	Winning team
March 13, 2012	Kentucky flintlock pistol	"Swing Into Action Challenge": Swing from one elevated platform to another over a 20-foot gap, then fire one shot at a set of 5 glass jugs from 30 feet with one hand and swing back. One shooter per jug; the next shooter must wait to swing out until the previous one has either swung back or climbed up. First team to hit all 5 jugs wins.	Gary, Kyle	Blue Team
March 13, 2012	Elimination challenge weapon(s)	Elimination challenge	Nominated for elimination	Eliminated player
March 13, 2012	Heckler & Koch USP Tactical pistol (.45 caliber)	"Moving Porthole Challenge": While keeping pace on foot with a moving wall, fire through a window at 20 glass jars placed 25–45 feet downrange. Higher number of hits in one run along the course wins; ties are broken with a second run.	Iggy, Tim	Iggy (Note: Tim and Iggy each hit 8 jars on their first run and used the same number of rounds. On the second run, Tim hit 18 targets to Iggy's 8.)

The trainer for the team challenge was Russ Combs, national flintlock champion. The trainer for the elimination challenge was Steve Gilcreast, former Army Ranger and SWAT team leader.

=== Episode 6: "Blast from the Past" ===
Premiere date	Team challenge weapon(s)	Team challenge	Benched player(s)	Winning team
March 20, 2012	3.2" bag gun (Note: The 3.2" Bag Gun gets its name from its bore diameter and the powder bag that is ignited to propel the projectile.) (firing 4.6-pound aluminum projectiles)	"Blast Off Challenge": Each player gets one chance to sight a target 300 yards away, while the rest of his/her teammates position and fire the cannon. Closest shot to the center of the bullseye wins.	Chee	Blue Team
March 20, 2012	Elimination challenge weapon(s)	Elimination challenge	Nominated for elimination	Eliminated player
March 20, 2012	Atlatl	"Atlatl Battle Challenge": Players take alternating throws at their choice of 3 targets from 30/45/60 feet. Points are awarded based on range and distance to the center of the target. Higher score after 10 rounds wins.	Tim, Chris	Tim

The trainer for the team challenge was Rick Pohlers, cannon expert. The trainer for the elimination challenge was Jack Dagger, primitive weapons expert.

=== Episode 7: "Trick Shot Shoot Off" ===
Premiere date	Team challenge weapon(s)	Team challenge	Benched player(s)	Winning team
March 27, 2012	Remington M1911 pistol Volquartsen Ruger 10/22 rifle	"Trick Shot Challenge": Each shooter competes at one of 5 stations.: 1. From 30 feet, fire the M1911 to drive a bowling pin backward through two others without knocking them down.; 2. Same as 1, but now the pin must go diagonally backward and knock over at least one of the others.; 3. From 75 feet, fire the Volquartsen and hit a bottle opener so that it pops the cap off a soda bottle.; 4. Hit the bottom bucket in a stack of two with the M1911 from 30 feet, knocking the top one into the air, then hit the top one before it reaches the ground.; 5. Shoot a gumball from 35 feet with the Volquartsen without hitting the golf tee on which it sits.; 3 attempts at each of the first 4 stations (1 point each). 4 attempts at station 5 (3 points each). Higher total score wins.	N/A	Red Team
March 27, 2012	Elimination challenge weapon(s)	Elimination challenge	Nominated for elimination	Eliminated player
March 27, 2012	SIG Sauer P229 pistol Browning Buck Mark pistol	"Tops & Bottoms Challenge": Shooters fire at separate racks of 10 bowling pins from 35 feet. The tops of the pins have been sawed off and set back on the bodies. They must use the Browning to shoot the tops off, then switch to the SIG to hit the bodies. One point per target hit; no points awarded if a pin's body is hit first. Higher score after 2 minutes wins.	Dylan, William	Dylan

The trainer for both challenges was Robert Vogel, 11-time national shooting champion.

=== Episode 8: "The Mad Minute" ===
Premiere date	Team challenge weapon(s)	Team challenge	Benched player(s)	Winning team
April 3, 2012	Webley Mk VI revolver	"Moving Speedfire Challenge": Shoot at separate moving grids of 30 targets from 35 feet. One player at a time per team, 6 shots per player. First team to hit all targets wins.	Gabby	Red Team
April 3, 2012	Elimination challenge weapon(s)	Elimination challenge	Nominated for elimination	Eliminated player
April 3, 2012	Lee–Enfield Mk III rifle	"Mad Minute Challenge": Fire at a 24" target from 200 yards. Higher number of hits in 60 seconds wins; ties are broken by fewer total rounds used.	Terry, Gregory	Terry (Note: Terry and Gregory each scored 6 hits, but Gregory won by using 11 rounds to Terry's 14.)

The trainer for both challenges was Iain Harrison, the winner of Season 1.

The "mad minute" originated as a pre-World War I term used by British riflemen during training to describe scoring 15 hits onto a 12" round target at 300 yd within one minute using a bolt-action rifle. The term still exists in modern military parlance to describe any short period of intense weapons fire.

=== Episode 9: "The Longest Shot" ===
The teams were dissolved in this episode. All players received green shirts and began to compete against each other for the rest of the season. After the individual challenge, all players voted for one of the players who had not won immunity. The top two vote-getters then competed in an elimination challenge as in previous episodes.

Premiere date	Individual challenge weapon(s)	Individual challenge	Winning player(s)	Eliminated player
April 10, 2012	Accuracy International AX338 rifle, using .338 Lapua Magnum ammunition	"1500 Yard Shot Challenge": Shoot at a 30-inch target from 1,500 yards; maximum 10 minutes and 20 rounds per player. The four fastest times to hit it are safe; next three are eligible for nomination; slowest is immediately eliminated.	Augie, Chee, Gary, Gregory	Gabby
April 10, 2012	Elimination challenge weapon(s)	Elimination challenge	Nominated for elimination	Eliminated player
April 10, 2012	Henry rifle	"Not Just the Bull's Eye Challenge": Shooters fire at separate sets of 5 targets from 45–55 feet. Each target consists of 3 sections, a bullseye and 2 outer rings (may be shot in any order). First to hit all sections of every target wins.	Chris, William (Note: Kyle and William tied for second place with 2 votes each. To break the tie, each fired one shot at a target; the one who hit closer to the center was safe.)	William

The trainers for both challenges were Kelly Bachand and George Reinas, contestants from Seasons 1 and 2.

=== Episode 10: "SWAT Throwdown" ===
Premiere date	Individual challenge weapon(s)	Individual challenge		Winning player(s)
April 17, 2012	FN Five-seven pistol	"Rappel Challenge": A 3-story, 30-foot tower is used, with a pair of windows at each story. Starting at the top, climb down a rope to each story, then shoot at 3 targets per window. Target size and distance decrease with each lower story (70, 50, 30 feet). Shooter must unload and holster the Five-Seven after finishing each window. The three fastest times to hit all targets are safe from elimination.		Chris, Kyle, Augie
April 17, 2012	Elimination challenge weapon(s)	Elimination challenge	Nominated for elimination	Eliminated player
April 17, 2012	Mossberg 500 "Chainsaw" shotgun (Note: The Mossberg 500 "Chainsaw" model has had the standard stock replaced by a pistol grip, allowing it to be fired from the hip. A wraparound handgrip, similar to that on a modern chainsaw, is attached to the fore-end so that the shooter can maintain leverage on the barrel for reduced muzzle flip when firing.); FN FS2000 rifle	"Back Alley Breach Challenge": Run a course with 3 stations while wearing full SWAT protective gear. At each station, use the Mossberg to breach a door, then switch to the FS2000 and shoot 3 targets. Size and distance increase at each station (35, 45, 50/60/70 feet). Shorter time to hit all targets wins.	Gary, Chee	Chee

The trainer for both challenges was Jeff Gonzales, former Navy SEAL and counter-terrorism instructor.

=== Episode 11: "Have Machine Gun Will Travel" ===
Premiere date	Individual challenge weapon(s)	Individual challenge		Winning player(s)
April 24, 2012	M1919 Browning machine gun	"Have Machine Gun, Will Travel Challenge": While riding in an M2A1 halftrack, fire at 15 targets from 25–100 feet. Target sizes range from 12" to 25"; maximum 100 rounds per player. The two highest numbers of hits in one pass along the course are safe.		Greg, Chris
April 24, 2012	Elimination challenge weapon(s)	Elimination challenge	Nominated for elimination	Eliminated player
April 24, 2012	FN PS90 carbine	"Keep in Memory Challenge": Shooters study 10 objects in a box, then cross a 20-foot rope and fire at separate racks of 30 objects, trying to hit only the duplicates of the ones in the box. Correct and incorrect hits award and deduct one point each, respectively. Shooters may return to their boxes as needed. Higher score after 1 minute and 15 seconds wins.	Augie, Kyle (Note: Gary and Kyle tied for second place with one vote apiece. Each fired one shot at a target; the one who hit closer to the center of the bullseye was safe.)	Kyle

The trainer for both challenges was Craig "Sawman" Sawyer, Navy SEALs instructor and former sniper.

=== Episode 12: "The Ultimate Prize" ===
No practice sessions were held in this episode. The six individual shooters eliminated prior to the final challenge returned to watch it, along with Allen Treadwell, a professional shooter sponsored by Bass Pro Shops.

Premiere date	Elimination challenge weapon(s)	Elimination challenge	Winning player(s)	Eliminated player
May 1, 2012	Winchester Model 1873 rifle	Two shooters at a time fire at 12 double-sided targets from 50 feet, trying to flip as many as possible to their assigned color. The winners of the first-round matches advance; the losers play a third match, with the loser of this one being eliminated. Ties are broken with a rematch.	1st round: Chris, Gary (won in rematch with Gregory); 2nd round: Gregory	Augie
May 1, 2012	Pistols: Remington M1911, Browning Buck Mark, FN Five-seven; Long Guns: Lee–Enfield Mk III rifle, M14 rifle, Benelli M4 shotgun	Two rounds are played, with every shooter picking one weapon, target, distance, and shooting stance in each. All three shooters try each shot; no weapon or target may be used more than once. The lowest number of hits is eliminated. Targets include jars, bowls, bottles, and mugs.	Gregory, Chris (guaranteed win after 5th shot)	Gary
May 1, 2012	Final challenge weapon(s)	Final challenge	Eliminated player	Top Shot
May 1, 2012	Kentucky flintlock pistol Henry rifle Webley Mk VI revolver Colt Peacemaker revolver BowTech StrykeZone 350 crossbow M1918A1 Browning Automatic Rifle; Milkor USA M32A1 grenade launcher	Run a course with 7 shooting stations: 1. Hit 2 jugs at 25 feet with the flintlock.; 2. Fire the Henry to knock down two 3-part targets at 50 feet.; 3. Using the Webley, hit 9 jars in a moving rack from 35 feet.; 4. Hit two rows of 6 targets each with the Colt. One row contains 10" targets, the other 8"; all targets in a row must be shot without a miss to close it out.; 5. Hit 3 targets on a rotating wheel at 25 yards with the BowTech.; 6. From the prone position, shoot 2 targets at 125/150 yards with the BAR.; 7. Use the Milkor to hit 2 targets at 50/75 yards.; First to complete all stations wins.	Gregory	Chris

=== Epilogue: Behind the Bullet ===
Premiering after the final episode, Top Shot Season Four Behind the Bullet, was a one-hour documentary involving behind-the-scene interviews and footage taken before, during, and after the season four competition. At the end of the episode, the show profiled each of the contestants, post-competition.

- Frank Melloni has opened his own firearms training academy.
- Keith Gibson is starting a new grass-fed dairy farm.
- Michelle Viscusi recently completed a photo shoot for Maxim.
- Colin Gallagher is back working as a Police Sergeant in Wichita. He has returned the bandana to Greg (Episode 4).
- Iggy Keyes has been shooting in local gun competitions.
- Tim Trefren recently left on his first trip of the spring bear-hunting season.
- Dylan Fletcher has started shooting locally in the USPSA, IPSC and IDPA.
- Terry Vaughan continues to travel as a professional speaker on body language.
- Gabby Franco is back in Miami teaching precision shooting.
- William Bethards will be competing at the National Rifle and Pistol Championship.
- Chee Kwan has applied to become a U.S. Marshal.
- Kyle Sumpter has been running lethal force and firearms training courses.
- Augie Malekovich has been teaching air rifle shooting to paralyzed veterans.
- Gary Shank has started a new job selling firearms.
- Gregory Littlejohn has been shooting USPSA matches. He spent most of his $6000 from Bass Pro Shops on ammo.
- Chris Cheng is excited to start his pro shooting career. He has yet to spend any of his championship winnings.

== Nomination Range ==
#	Episode	1	2	3	4	5	6	7	8	9	10	11	12		
#	Nominated	Gregory; 4/8 Votes	Kyle; 3/8 Votes	Terry; 4/7 Votes	Gregory; 2/6 Votes	Tim; 3/7 Votes	Chris; 2/6 Votes	William; 2/5 Votes	Gregory; 2/4 Votes	Chris; 3/7 Votes	Gary; 3/6 Votes	Augie; 3/5 Votes	None	None	None
#	Eliminated	Frank; 3/8 Votes	Keith; 3/8 Votes	Michelle; 2/7 Votes	Colin; 3/6 Votes	Iggy; 3/7 Votes	Tim; 2/6 Votes	Dylan; 2/5 Votes	Terry; 2/4 Votes	William; 2/7 Votes	Chee; 2/6 Votes	Kyle; 1/5 Votes	Augie	Gary	Gregory
#	Contestants	Votes													
1	Chris		Keith			Iggy	Chee			William	Gary	Augie	None	None	None
2	Gregory	Frank		Terry	Colin			Dylan	Terry	William	Chee	Gary	None	None	None
3	Gary		Keith			Tim	Tim			Kyle	None	Augie	None	None	
4	Augie	Frank		Michelle	Gregory			None	Gregory	Chris	Gary	Kyle	None		
5	Kyle		None			Iggy	Tim			Chris	Chee	Augie			
6	Chee		Keith			None	None			Kyle	Gary				
7	William	Gregory		Terry	Colin			Dylan	Terry	Chris					
8	Gabby		Kyle			Tim	Chris								
9	Terry	None		Michelle	Gregory			William	Gregory						
10	Dylan	Gregory		Colin	Colin			William							
11	Tim		Kyle			Iggy	Chris								
12	Iggy		Kyle			Tim									
13	Colin	Gregory		Terry	None										
14	Michelle	Frank		Terry											
15	Keith		None												
16	Frank	Gregory													
17	Forrest	None													
18	Craig	None													

1. Episode 1: Forrest and Craig were eliminated in a preliminary challenge.
2. Episode 9: Gabby was eliminated due to having the worst performance in the individual challenge. At the nomination range, William and Kyle tied for second place with 2 votes each; Kyle won a shoot-off to gain immunity.
3. Episode 11: Gary and Kyle tied for second place with one vote each; Gary won a shoot-off to gain immunity.
