= Top Shot season 2 =

Top Shot
- Season 2
- Region 1 DVD cover
- No. of episodes: 12

Release
- Original network: History
- Original release: February 8 – April 26, 2011

Season chronology
- ← Previous; Season 1 Next → Season 3

The second season of the History Channel television series Top Shot, titled Top Shot Reloaded commenced airing on February 8, 2011, and concluded on April 26, 2011. The season contained twelve episodes, and was filmed over a period of 35 days in the fall of 2010 in Santa Clarita, California. The winner of the season was American Chris Reed.

Chris Reed later appeared as a coach in Seasons 3 and 4; George Reinas also appeared as a coach in Seasons 4 and 5.

Brian Zins, Joe Serafini, and Jamie Franks returned for Top Shot: All-Stars. Franks finished in 10th, Serafini finished in 8th, and Zins finished in 4th. According to Colby Donaldson's Twitter, George Reinas was invited to compete as well.

== Contestants ==
| Contestant | Occupation / Background | Original Team | Merged Team | Eliminated |
|---|---|---|---|---|
| Travis Marsh; 37, Ruth, CA | Environmental Business Project Manager, eight-time State Champ for Running Game Targets, 14 years on the U.S. Shooting Team with rifle, 10-time National Junior Champ | Blue Team | | 16th Place |
| Athena Lee; 32, Katy, TX | Oil company contractor & firearms instructor, competition shooter with various awards since 1999. USPSA Open Division Master (and one of only a handful of female Master class shooters) | Red Team | | 15th Place |
| John Guida; 44, Buffalo, NY | Restaurant owner, 12-year USPSA member, competition shooter with various awards. | Red Team | | 14th Place |
| Jermaine Finks; 38, Lancaster, PA | Federal agent & firearms instructor, US Army veteran, former Pennsylvania State Constable, Department of Homeland Security instructor in tactics, defensive measures and firearms. | Blue Team | | 13th Place |
| Maggie Reese; 31, Chino, CA | Professional shooter, 13 years of experience in shooting sports with various awards. | Blue Team | | 12th Place |
| Eric Anderson; 46, Webster, FL | Landfill supervisor, Marine Corps veteran and marksmanship instructor, certified hunting safety instructor for Florida fish and wildlife conservation, former police officer. | Red Team | | 11th Place |
| Chris Tilley; 25, Raleigh, NC | Professional shooter & firearms retailer and instructor, competition shooter with various awards, USPSA Grand Master | Blue Team | | 10th Place |
| Kyle Frasure; 23, Anaheim Hills, CA | Server, competition shotgun shooter, expert .22 caliber rifle shooter, various awards. | Blue Team | | 9th Place |
| Daryl Parker; 44, Ft. Smith, AR | Sheriff's lieutenant, Marine Corps veteran, certified Law Enforcement Firearms instructor. | Blue Team | | 8th Place |
| Jay Lim; 35, Fullerton, CA | Golf instructor, competition pistol and archer shooter with various awards, Olympic training. | Blue Team | Green Team | 7th Place |
| Ashley Spurlin; 34, Richmond, VA | United States Air Force Combat Controller. | Blue Team | Green Team | 6th Place |
| Jamie Franks; 31, Selma, NC | US Navy rescue swimmer, graduate of the Navy Expeditionary Combat Skills and Practical Weapons courses and Anti-Terrorism Force Protection/Deadly Force Training, Navy rifle and pistol marksmanship expert. | Red Team | Green Team | 5th Place |
| Joe Serafini; 28, Bourbonnais, IL | Construction worker, Company High Shooter in Marine boot camp, Champion archer, qualified expert with both the M16 and Beretta 9mm pistols. | Red Team | Green Team | 4th Place |
| George Reinas; 26, Cinnaminson, NJ | USAF US Air Force CPEC instructor certified, Air Force Security Forces pre-deployment Instructor. | Red Team | Green Team | 3rd Place |
| Brian "Gunny" Zins; 41, Poland, OH | Independent security contractor, former US Marine Corps Military Police Officer, combat marksmanship instructor for Marine Corps with rifle and pistol, Trained in FBI advanced firearms. 10-time NRA Conventional Pistol (Bullseye) Champion. | Red Team | Green Team | 2nd Place |
| Chris Reed; 37, Greenwood, MS | Realtor, Marine Corps honor graduate and Company High Shooter, competition shooter with various awards. | Red Team | Green Team | Winner |

== Contestant progress ==
| # | Contestant | Episodes | | | | | | | | | | | | | |
| # | Contestant | 1 | 2 | 3 | 4 | 5 | 6 | 7 | 8 | 9 | 10 | 11 | 12 | | |
|---|---|---|---|---|---|---|---|---|---|---|---|---|---|---|---|
| 1 | Chris R. | WIN | SAFE | WIN | WIN | SAFE | WIN | WIN | WIN | SAFE | SAFE | NOM | WIN | BTM2 | TOP SHOT |
| 2 | Brian | WIN | SAFE | WIN | WIN | SAFE | WIN | WIN | WIN | WIN | SAFE | SAFE | WIN | WIN | SECOND PLACE |
| 3 | George | WIN | SAFE | WIN | WIN | SAFE | WIN | WIN | WIN | SAFE | SAFE | WIN | BTM2 | OUT | |
| 4 | Joe | WIN | SAFE | WIN | WIN | SAFE | WIN | WIN | WIN | SAFE | NOM | SAFE | OUT | | |
| 5 | Jamie | WIN | NOM | WIN | WIN | NOM | WIN | WIN | WIN | NOM | WIN | OUT | | | |
| 6 | Ashley | SAFE | WIN | SAFE | SAFE | WIN | SAFE | NOM | SAFE | SAFE | OUT | | | | |
| 7 | Jay | SAFE | WIN | NOM | SAFE | WIN | SAFE | SAFE | NOM | OUT | | | | | |
| 8 | Daryl | SAFE | WIN | SAFE | SAFE | WIN | NOM | SAFE | OUT | | | | | | |
| 9 | Kyle | SAFE | WIN | SAFE | NOM | WIN | SAFE | OUT | | | | | | | |
| 10 | Chris T. | NOM | WIN | SAFE | SAFE | WIN | OUT | | | | | | | | |
| 11 | Eric | WIN | SAFE | WIN | WIN | OUT | | | | | | | | | |
| 12 | Maggie | SAFE | WIN | SAFE | OUT | | | | | | | | | | |
| 13 | Jermaine | SAFE | WIN | OUT | | | | | | | | | | | |
| 14 | John | WIN | SAFE | QUIT | | | | | | | | | | | |
| 15 | Athena | WIN | OUT | | | | | | | | | | | | |
| 16 | Travis | OUT | | | | | | | | | | | | | |

The player's team (episodes 1–8) won the team challenge.
The player(s) (episodes 9–12) won the individual challenge.
The player's team (episodes 1–8) lost the challenge, but the player was not nominated for elimination; or the player (episodes 9–11) did not win the individual challenge but was not nominated for elimination
The player was nominated for elimination, but won an elimination challenge; or the player (episode 12) was in the bottom two challengers but won a tiebreaker
The player lost an elimination challenge and was eliminated from the competition.
The player voluntarily withdrew from the competition.
The player won the $100,000 grand prize.
The player came in second.

== Episodes ==
=== Episode 1: "Sharpshooter Surprise" ===
| Premiere date | Preliminary challenge weapon(s) | Preliminary challenge | Red Team Winner | Blue Team Winner |
|---|---|---|---|---|
| February 8, 2011 | Sharps rifle | Players take one shot each at a 10-inch target from 200 yards. The two closest shots to the center of the bullseye get to pick the teams. | Chris R. | Jay |
| February 8, 2011 | Team challenge weapon(s) | Team challenge | Benched player(s) | Winning team |
| February 8, 2011 | M1911 pistol | Shoot solid-color billiard balls (1–8) from 25 to 50 feet in ascending order, avoiding the striped balls (9–15) on the range. One shot per player per turn. | N/A | Red Team |
| February 8, 2011 | Elimination challenge weapon(s) | Elimination challenge | Nominated for elimination | Eliminated player |
| February 8, 2011 | Smith & Wesson Model 29 .44 Magnum revolver | Shoot at 8 suspended targets that move toward the player from 80 feet out. Players must hit as many targets as possible before they fall to the ground and out of play. | Chris T., Travis | Travis |

No practice sessions were held for the preliminary and team challenges. The trainer for the elimination challenge was Bill Davis, a .44 Magnum expert.

=== Episode 2: "Shoot or Be Shot" ===
| Premiere date | Team challenge weapon(s) | Team challenge | Benched player(s) | Winning team |
|---|---|---|---|---|
| February 15, 2011 | Colt Official Police .38 revolver, Paintball gun | Run a relay race with 7 stations, firing at 3 targets from 30/40/50 feet at each; one shot per target. As players run from one station to the next, they must avoid paintballs fired by the other team, with a score deduction for each hit. | John | Blue Team |
| February 15, 2011 | Elimination challenge weapon(s) | Elimination challenge | Nominated for elimination | Eliminated player |
| February 15, 2011 | Thompson submachine gun | From 25 feet, shoot through a porthole in a door at a red line on an 8-inch-wide board, trying to split it. Maximum six 50-round magazines per player. | Jamie, Athena | Athena |

The trainer for the team challenge was Steve Gilcreast, SWAT firearms trainer and Ranger School graduate. The trainer for the elimination challenge was Michael Friend, machine gun expert.

=== Episode 3: "Uphill Battle" ===
| Premiere date | Team challenge weapon(s) | Team challenge | Benched player(s) | Winning team |
|---|---|---|---|---|
| February 22, 2011 | M1A rifle | Run an uphill relay race with 4 shooting stations and targets at 75/100 yards. Each team splits into three pairs, with each player in a pair shooting one target and spotting the other. Once a pair completes a station, the next pair must run up from the starting line to get the rifle and move to the next station. The pair from the first station also shoots the fourth one to destroy an ammunition dump. | Kyle | Red Team |
| February 22, 2011 | Elimination challenge weapon(s) | Elimination challenge | Nominated for elimination | Eliminated player |
| February 22, 2011 | Glock 17 9×19mm pistol | Shoot at 20 "friend" and 20 "foe" targets, set 25/35/50/65 feet behind a wall that opens and closes randomly. Each player has two full magazines and 30 seconds to hit the "foes" while avoiding the "friends." | Jermaine, Jay | Jermaine |

The trainer for both challenges was Craig Sawyer, Navy SEALs instructor and former sniper.

Before the start of the team challenge, John withdrew from the competition, citing injuries to both legs. Since this decision left the Blue Team with one extra player, they were allowed to decide for themselves who would be benched.

^1 There was a second-place tie between Jay and Kyle. It was broken by Maggie's vote.
^2 Jay and Jermaine each scored 6 points, Jay with 6 "foes" and no "friends," Jermaine with 7 "foes" and 1 "friend." Since Jay hit fewer "friends," he won the challenge.

=== Episode 4: "Compound Fracture" ===
| Premiere date | Team challenge weapon(s) | Team challenge | Benched player(s) | Winning team |
|---|---|---|---|---|
| March 1, 2011 | BowTech Assassin compound bow | From 35 feet, shoot through six long curved tubes of decreasing diameter (3 inches to 1.5 inches), with a target at the far end of each. One player per tube, one shot per turn. Shorter time to hit all targets wins the challenge. | N/A | Red Team |
| March 1, 2011 | Elimination challenge weapon(s) | Elimination challenge | Nominated for elimination | Eliminated player |
| March 1, 2011 | BowTech Assassin compound bow | While standing on an elevated platform, players shoot at balloon targets that pop up at random from behind three tree trunks 35 feet away. They have 3 minutes to hit up to 8 targets in their assigned colors. | Kyle, Maggie | Maggie |

The trainer for both challenges was Chris Brackett, a compound bow expert.

=== Episode 5: "Quickfire Face-Off" ===
| Premiere date | Team challenge weapon(s) | Team challenge | Benched player(s) | Winning team |
|---|---|---|---|---|
| March 8, 2011 | M1911 pistol | Each team shoots at its own grid of 100 targets from 35 feet. One player at a time, two full magazines per player. Each team is provided with 100 rounds loaded into magazines, but must load any additional rounds themselves. First team to hit all targets wins. | Brian | Blue Team |
| March 8, 2011 | Elimination challenge weapon(s) | Elimination challenge | Nominated for elimination | Eliminated player |
| March 8, 2011 | 2011 RazorCat race gun | From 25 feet, shoot at 22 targets in each of two colors, set on three concentric spinning rings. Players have two 20-round magazines and 60 seconds to hit as many targets in their assigned color as possible. | Jamie, Eric | Eric |

The trainers for both challenges were Simon "J.J." Racaza and Blake Miguez, two contestants from Season 1.

^3 The RazorCat race gun is named after J. J. "Razor" Racaza. Less than 100 have been made.

=== Episode 6: "Bury the Hatchet" ===
| Premiere date | Team challenge weapon(s) | Team challenge | Benched player(s) | Winning team |
|---|---|---|---|---|
| March 15, 2011 | Tomahawk | From 13 feet, teams take alternating throws at a square grid of 36 targets. Once a target has been hit, it is out of play. First team to make an unbroken horizontal/vertical/diagonal line of four targets wins. | N/A | Red Team |
| March 15, 2011 | Elimination challenge weapon(s) | Elimination challenge | Nominated for elimination | Eliminated player |
| March 15, 2011 | Blowgun | From 30 feet, players shoot at separate grids of 32 balloon targets. Each balloon has a smaller one inside. They have 2 minutes to break as many of the outer balloons as possible without hitting the inner ones. | Daryl, Chris T. | Chris T. |

The trainer for both challenges was Jack Dagger, primitive weapons expert.

=== Episode 7: "Trick Shot Showdown II" ===
| Premiere date | Team challenge weapon(s) | Team challenge | Benched player(s) | Winning team |
|---|---|---|---|---|
| March 22, 2011 | M1911 pistol Colt Official Police .38 revolver Ruger Security-Six .357 Magnum revolver | Recreations of exhibition shots, all at 25 feet and with one player per station. (1) Fire three shots from the M1911 at an axe blade, trying to split the bullet and hit balloons on both sides. (2) Use the Colt to shoot the corncob pipes out of the mouths of three mannequins. (3) Fire two Rugers at the same time, trying to hit three pairs of plates in vertical racks. (4) Same as 3, but with the plates in horizontal racks. | Brian | Red Team |
| March 22, 2011 | Elimination challenge weapon(s) | Elimination challenge | Nominated for elimination | Eliminated player |
| March 22, 2011 | Ruger Security-Six .357 Magnum revolver | The player is strapped to a vertical wheel, spun through five revolutions, and stopped upside down. He must then draw and fire six shots, trying to hit up to six bottles 35 feet away. | Ashley, Kyle | Kyle |

The trainer for the team challenge was Steve Doran, firearms instructor. The trainer for the elimination challenge was Taran Butler, national/world pistol champion.

^4 The daring shot was performed for years by exhibition shooter Bob Geesey, who would shoot a pipe out of his wife's mouth.
^5 The upside-down shot was performed by Johnny "Cowboy Kid" Baker, who was adopted by Buffalo Bill.

=== Episode 8: "Catch .22" ===
| Premiere date | Team challenge weapon(s) | Team challenge | Benched player(s) | Winning team |
|---|---|---|---|---|
| March 29, 2011 | Ruger 10/22 carbine | Each team has 5 minutes to fire at 80 stationary/moving targets set up in a shooting gallery 50 feet away. One player at a time, 20 shots per turn. | Joe, Chris R. | Red Team |
| March 29, 2011 | Elimination challenge weapon(s) | Elimination challenge | Nominated for elimination | Eliminated player |
| March 29, 2011 | Smith & Wesson Model 317 kit gun (.22 revolver); Ruger 10/22 carbine | Shoot at two sets of 10 targets each, at 25 feet (revolver) and 50 feet (rifle). Targets in each set are arranged behind each other in a line, in descending order of size from 7 inches to 1.5 inches. First player to hit all 20 targets wins. | Daryl, Jay | Daryl |

The trainer for both challenges was Spencer Hoglund, historical weapons expert and four-time national champion speed shooter.

^6 There was a three-way tie between Jay, Daryl, and Ashley. Donaldson drew Ashley's name and announced that he would be safe from elimination.

=== Episode 9: "The 1,000 Yard Shot" ===
The teams were dissolved in this episode. All players received green shirts and began to compete directly against one another for the rest of the season.

After the individual challenge, all players voted on the nomination range. The top two vote-getters then competed in an elimination challenge as in earlier episodes.

| Premiere date | Individual challenge weapon(s) | Individual challenge | | Winning player |
|---|---|---|---|---|
| April 5, 2011 | Barrett M82A1 rifle (.50 BMG) | Shoot at a 30-inch target from 1,000 yards; maximum 5 minutes and 15 rounds per player. Fastest time to hit the target is safe from elimination. | | Brian |
| April 5, 2011 | Elimination challenge weapon(s) | Elimination challenge | Nominated for elimination | Eliminated player |
| April 5, 2011 | M1 Garand rifle | Each player fires up to 16 rounds at 10 hidden targets that pop up, one at a time, from 100 to 125 yards. The kneeling position must be used for the first 5 targets, the prone position for the last 5. | Jay, Jamie | Jay |

The trainer for both challenges was Ryan Cleckner, former Army Ranger Sniper from 1st Ranger Bn/75th Ranger Regiment and sniper instructor.

^7 1,000 yards is the longest shot trainees take before graduating from sniper school.

=== Episode 10: "The Shakedown" ===
| Premiere date | Individual challenge weapon(s) | Individual challenge | | Winning player |
|---|---|---|---|---|
| April 12, 2011 | Pistols: SIG Sauer P228, Browning Hi-Power; Rifles: AR-15, FN FAL | Each player has 3 minutes to complete a course with 4 stations, firing from an unstable platform at each.: 1. Platform suspended from chains; SIG; 3 targets at 35 feet.; 2. Platform balanced on inner tubes; Browning; 3 targets at 35 feet.; 3. Platform suspended from ropes; AR-15; 2 targets at 50/100 yards.; 4. Balance on a suspended beam; FAL; 2 targets at 50/100 yards.; Fastest time to finish the course is safe from elimination. | | Jamie |
| April 12, 2011 | Elimination challenge weapon(s) | Elimination challenge | Nominated for elimination | Eliminated player |
| April 12, 2011 | Browning Hi-Power pistol | Each player has 40 seconds and 20 rounds to shoot up to 10 stationary targets from 35 to 50 feet, without hitting the swinging targets in front of them. | Ashley, Joe | Ashley |

The trainer for both challenges was Iain Harrison, the winner of Season 1.

=== Episode 11: "Down to the Wire" ===
| Premiere date | Individual challenge weapon(s) | Individual challenge | | Winning player(s) |
|---|---|---|---|---|
| April 19, 2011 | Glock 17 9×19mm pistol | Each player is strapped into a harness and hauled up 125 feet by a construction crane. While in a controlled fall, he shoots at 10 ground targets placed 25–50 feet downrange. Highest number of hits is safe from elimination. | | George |
| April 19, 2011 | Elimination challenge weapon(s) | Elimination challenge | Nominated for elimination | Eliminated player |
| April 19, 2011 | Benelli M2 (Super 90) shotgun | While riding at 25 miles per hour in the back of a Humvee, shoot at 8 clay targets launched in pairs and singles along the route. | Jamie, Chris R. | Jamie |

The trainer for the individual challenge was Matt Burkett, practical shooting expert. The trainer for the elimination challenge was Cory Kruse, shotgun world champion.

=== Episode 12: "Season Two Finale" ===
No practice sessions were held in this episode. The five individual players eliminated prior to the final challenge returned to watch it.

| Premiere date | Elimination challenge weapon(s) | Elimination challenge | Winning player(s) | Eliminated player |
|---|---|---|---|---|
| April 26, 2011 | Browning Hi-Power pistol | Two players at a time have 30 seconds to shoot at separate sets of 20 targets from 30 feet. The targets are split into groups of 5; each player can shoot four plates in the center to expose one of his own groups and cover one of his opponent's. The winners of the first-round matches advance, with the losers competing against each other in a second round. The loser of this match is eliminated. | 1st round: Brian, Chris R. 2nd round: George | Joe |
| April 26, 2011 | Handguns: Browning Hi-Power pistol, Ruger Security-Six .357 Magnum revolver, Colt Official Police .38 revolver Rifles: M1A, AR-15, Sharps | Two rounds are played, with each player choosing a weapon, target, and distance in both; all three players try every shot. No weapon or target may be chosen more than once. After all six weapons have been used, the player with the fewest hits is eliminated. Targets available include jars, shot glasses, plates, tin cans, and poker chips. | Brian (guaranteed win after 4th shot); Chris R. | George |
| April 26, 2011 | Final challenge weapon(s) | Final challenge | Eliminated player | Top Shot |
| April 26, 2011 | Tomahawk; Compound bow Smith & Wesson Model 29 .44 Magnum revolver FN FAL rifle M1911 pistol Ruger 10/22 carbine Barrett M82A1 rifle | Run a course with 7 shooting stations: 1. Throw the tomahawk to hit a log 11 feet away.; 2. Use the bow to fire an arrow into a tube from 35 feet and break a glass jug at the far end.; 3. Fire the S&W to hit two targets at 25/50 feet.; 4. Standing on an unstable platform, shoot two targets at 50/100 yards with the FAL.; 5. Shoot a grid of 16 targets at 35 feet with the M1911.; 6. Using the Ruger, hit a line of 5 targets at 50 feet, arranged one behind the other in descending order of size.; 7. Hit a target at 1,000 yards with the Barrett.; First player to finish the course wins. | Brian | Chris R. |

=== Epilogue: Behind the Bullet ===
Premiering after the final episode, Top Shot Behind the Bullet, was a one-hour documentary involving behind-the-scene interviews and footage taken before, during, and after the season two competition. At the end of the episode, the show profiled each of the contestants, post-competition.

- Travis Marsh is starting a junior shooting program in his community.
- Athena Lee will compete on the Women's Open Team in Greece.
- John Guida is running the family restaurant and competing locally.
- Jermaine Finks is still working for Homeland Security.
- Maggie Reese will be competing at the World Shoot in Greece.
- Eric Anderson continues to compete in mounted shooting.
- Chris Tilley is competing in world championships.
- Kyle Frasure has been shooting with Maggie and Jay.
- Daryl Parker just published his first novel.
- Jay Lim is still a golf instructor. He hopes to be an NRA certified pistol instructor soon.
- Ashley Spurlin is currently in Afghanistan.
- Jamie Franks has just returned from a deployment in Afghanistan.
- Joe Serafini is back working construction and competing in archery tournaments.
- George Reinas is finishing his Air Force service and is a guest instructor at CPEC.
- Brian Zins is going into production with his own line of ammunition.
- Chris Reed is hoping to teach more people about hunting and marksmanship. He plans on investing his winnings for his kids' education.

== Nomination Range ==
| | | Original Teams | | | | | | | | | Merged Team | | | | | |
| # | Episode | 1 | 2 | 3 | | 4 | 5 | 6 | 7 | 8 | 9 | 10 | 11 | 12 | | |
|---|---|---|---|---|---|---|---|---|---|---|---|---|---|---|---|---|
| # | Nominated | Chris T. 3/8 Votes | Jamie; 3/8 Votes | None | Jay; 2/8 Votes | Kyle; 3/6 Votes | Jamie; 3/6 Votes | Daryl; 3/5 Votes | Ashley; 2/4 Votes | Jay; 1/3 Votes | Jamie; 3/7 Votes | Joe; 2/6 Votes | Chris R. 2/5 Votes | None | None | None |
| # | Eliminated | Travis; 3/8 Votes | Athena; 3/8 Votes | John; No Votes | Jermaine; 5/8 Votes | Maggie; 3/6 Votes | Eric; 2/6 Votes | Chris T. 2/5 Votes | Kyle; 2/4 Votes | Daryl; 1/3 Votes | Jay; 3/7 Votes | Ashley; 3/6 Votes | Jamie; 3/5 Votes | Joe | George | Brian |
| # | Contestants | Votes | | | | | | | | | | | | | | |
| 1 | Chris R. | | Jamie | None | | | Jamie | | | | Jay | Ashley | Jamie | None | None | None |
| 2 | Brian | | Athena | None | | | Eric | | | | Jamie | Joe | Chris R. | None | None | None |
| 3 | George | | Athena | None | | | Jamie | | | | Jamie | Brian | Jamie | None | None | |
| 4 | Joe | | Jamie | None | | | Eric | | | | Jay | Ashley | Jamie | None | | |
| 5 | Jamie | | None | None | | | None | | | | Jay | Ashley | Chris R. | | | |
| 6 | Ashley | None | | | Jermaine | Kyle | | Daryl | Kyle | Daryl | Jamie | Joe | | | | |
| 7 | Jay | Chris T. | | | Jermaine | Maggie | | Chris T. | Kyle | Ashley | Joe | | | | | |
| 8 | Daryl | Chris T. | | | Jay | Maggie | | Chris T. | Ashley | Jay | | | | | | |
| 9 | Kyle | Travis | | | Jermaine | Maggie | | Daryl | Ashley | | | | | | | |
| 10 | Chris T. | Travis | | | Jermaine | Kyle | | Daryl | | | | | | | | |
| 11 | Eric | | Athena | None | | | Jamie | | | | | | | | | |
| 12 | Maggie | Travis | | | Jermaine | Kyle | | | | | | | | | | |
| 13 | Jermaine | Kyle | | | Kyle | | | | | | | | | | | |
| 14 | John | | Jamie | None | | | | | | | | | | | | |
| 15 | Athena | | None | | | | | | | | | | | | | |
| 16 | Travis | Chris T. | | | | | | | | | | | | | | |
