= Top Shot season 5 =

Top Shot
- Season 5
- Region 1 DVD cover
- No. of episodes: 12

Release
- Original network: History
- Original release: May 29 – August 28, 2013

Season chronology
- ← Previous; Season 4

The fifth season of the History Channel television series Top Shot premiered on May 29, 2013. It is an all-star season with all competitors returning from prior seasons.

Unlike past seasons, the players are not assigned to teams, but compete on an individual basis throughout the season. Also, the process of nominating players for elimination is not used. Instead, the lowest-performing players from an individual challenge take part in a "Proving Ground" challenge; the two lowest performers from this step then compete head-to-head in an elimination challenge.

The season was filmed in Santa Clarita, California.

== Contestants ==
Contestant	Original Season / Place	Occupation/Background	Eliminated
Phil Morden	Season 3 / 6th	Video Producer, Three Gun Competitor, Gunsmith	Winner
Chris Cerino	Season 1 / 2nd	Law enforcement trainer	2nd Place
Gary Quesenberry	Season 3 / 3rd	Department of Homeland Security Agent, U.S. Army Veteran, Competition Shooter	3rd Place
Brian Zins	Season 2 / 2nd	Cabot Gun Ambassador, independent security contractor, former Marine Corps pistol team member, 12-time NRA National Pistol Champion	4th Place
William Bethards	Season 4 / 7th	FBI Law Enforcement Specialist/Firearms Instructor, Former Marine, Marine Corps Shooting Team Member and Coach, Ex-Virginia State Trooper, National and State 3-gun Competitive Shooter, Gold Lauchheimer Trophy Winner, FBI Shooting Team National Record Holder in 3-gun	5th Place
Peter Palma	Season 1 / 4th	Plumber, Marine Scout Sniper	6th Place
Adam Benson	Season 1 / 6th	Construction project manager, former Marine rifleman, USPSA Master Class shooter, competitive pistol and three-gun shooter, muzzleloader and archery hobbyist, competitive catapult engineer	7th Place
Joe Serafini	Season 2 / 4th	Construction worker, Company High Shooter in Marine boot camp, Champion archer, qualified expert with both the M16 and Beretta 9mm pistols.	8th Place
Kelly Bachand	Season 1 / 5th	Student, competition shooter, USA National Rifle Team	9th Place
Jamie Franks	Season 2 / 5th	US Navy rescue swimmer, graduate of the Navy Expeditionary Combat Skills and Practical Weapons courses and Anti-Terrorism Force Protection/Deadly Force Training, Navy rifle and pistol marksmanship expert.	10th Place
Alex Charvat	Season 3 / 5th	Gun range engineer, 4H-shooting instructor, 3-Gun competitor, firearms enthusiast	11th Place
Gabby Franco	Season 4 / 8th	Firearms instructor, business owner, competitive IPSC shooter, history maker as the first female to qualify for the Venezuelan Olympic Shooting Team, 2000 Sydney Olympics competitor, 1999 Pan American Games silver medalist shooter, 2000 South American Games gold medalist shooter, 2002 South American Games three-time gold medalist shooter	12th Place
Kyle Sumpter	Season 4 / 5th	Police Commander, Former SWAT Team Member, Washington State IDPA and Steel Championship Winner	13th Place
Chee Kwan	Season 4 / 6th	Range Master, State Certified Firearms Instructor, Former Marine Infantryman, Recreational Shooter, 3x Rifle and Pistol Expert	14th Place
Blake Miguez	Season 1 / 7th	Semi-professional speed shooter	15th Place
Gregory Littlejohn	Season 4 / 2nd	Federal Police Officer, USAF Veteran, Former Air Force Security Forces Member, World Champion Grenadier, ISPC Shooter	16th Place

== Contestants progress ==
#	Contestant	Episodes													
#	Contestant	1	2	3	4	5	6	7	8	9	10	11	12		
1	Phil	SAFE	WIN	SAFE	SAFE	WIN	SAFE	SAFE	WIN	LOW	SAFE	WIN	WIN	WIN	TOP SHOT
2	Chris	SAFE	WIN	SAFE	SAFE	WIN	SAFE	WIN	SAFE	SAFE	SAFE	LOW	SAFE	SAFE	SECOND PLACE
3	Gary	LOW	WIN	SAFE	WIN	SAFE	SAFE	LOW	SAFE	SAFE	SAFE	SAFE	SAFE	OUT	
4	Brian	SAFE	SAFE	SAFE	SAFE	SAFE	LOW	SAFE	SAFE	SAFE	LOW	LOW	OUT		
5	William	SAFE	SAFE	SAFE	SAFE	WIN	SAFE	SAFE	WIN	WIN	WIN	OUT			
6	Peter	SAFE	SAFE	SAFE	SAFE	WIN	LOW	SAFE	WIN	SAFE	OUT				
7	Adam	SAFE	SAFE	SAFE	SAFE	WIN	SAFE	SAFE	LOW	WIN	OUT				
8	Joe	SAFE	SAFE	SAFE	SAFE	SAFE	SAFE	SAFE	SAFE	OUT					
9	Kelly	WIN	SAFE	WIN	SAFE	SAFE	SAFE	SAFE	OUT						
10	Jamie	SAFE	WIN	SAFE	LOW	WIN	WIN	OUT							
11	Alex	SAFE	WIN	SAFE	SAFE	LOW	OUT								
12	Gabby	SAFE	SAFE	LOW	SAFE	OUT									
13	Kyle	SAFE	LOW	SAFE	OUT										
14	Chee	SAFE	SAFE	OUT											
15	Blake	SAFE	OUT												
16	Gregory	OUT													

The player(s) either won an individual challenge or performed well enough to earn immunity from elimination for the current round.
The player(s) lost an individual challenge, but did not lose a Proving Ground challenge.
The player lost a Proving Ground challenge, but won an elimination challenge.
The player lost an elimination challenge and was eliminated.
The player voluntarily withdrew from the competition.
The player won the $100,000 grand prize, the title of Top Shot, and a Q5i speedboat.

== Episodes ==
=== Episode 1: "Best of the Best" ===
Premiere date	Individual challenge weapon(s)	Individual challenge		Winning player(s)
May 29, 2013	SVT-40 rifle LaRue Tactical Optimized Battle Rifle (based on the AR-10/AR-15 rifles); FN FAL rifle	Run an obstacle course with 3 shooting stations under simulated mortar/flamethrower fire: 1. Cross a rope to the first station, then shoot one target at 125 yards with the SVT-40 (prone position).; 2. Climb a pole to the second station and hit one target with the LaRue (standing).; 3. Crawl under barbed wire to the third station, then use the FAL to hit one target (standing on an unstable platform).; Fastest time wins a pair of Oculus binoculars; the eight fastest times are safe from elimination.		Alex, Blake, Chris, Jamie, Joe, Kelly (winner), Peter, Phil
May 29, 2013	Proving Ground challenge weapon(s)	Proving Ground challenge	Sent to Proving Ground	Sent to elimination challenge
May 29, 2013	Colt Peacemaker revolver	Fire one shot at a target from 40 feet. The two players whose shots are farthest from the center go to the elimination challenge.	Adam, Brian, Chee, Gabby, Gary, Gregory, Kyle, William	Gary, Gregory
May 29, 2013	Elimination challenge weapon(s)	Elimination challenge		Eliminated player
May 29, 2013	Milkor USA M32A1 grenade launcher	Fire at 4 targets from 50/60/70/75 yards. First to hit all targets wins.		Gregory

No practice session was held for the individual challenge. The trainer for the elimination challenge was Craig "Sawman" Sawyer, Navy SEALs instructor and former sniper.

=== Episode 2: "Tricks of the Trade" ===
Premiere date	Squad challenge weapon(s)	Squad challenge		Winning player(s)
June 5, 2013	Winchester Model 1873 rifle Smith & Wesson Model 10 revolver M1911 pistol Colt Peacemaker revolver	A series of trick shots from past seasons: 1. Using a hand mirror to sight, fire over the shoulder and hit a beer bottle at 25 feet. (Winchester; 3 shots, 1 point each); 2. Shoot the corncob pipe out of a mannequin's mouth. (Model 10; 3 shots, 1 point each); 3. Shoot a bowling pin so that it travels backward between two others without knocking them down. (M1911; 3 shots, 1 point each); 4. Shoot the bottom paint can in a stack of two, knocking the top can into the air, then shoot the top one before it hits the ground. (M1911; 3 shots, 1 point each); 5. Fire a bullet at an axe blade so that it splits to break a balloon on each side. (Colt; 4 shots, 3 points for each pair of balloons broken); The players are split into three 5-person squads, with each squad member trying a different shot. Each member of the highest-scoring squad wins an Ascend backpacking tent; the lowest-scoring squad goes to the Proving Ground.		Alex, Chris, Gary, Jamie, Phil (winners); Adam, Brian, Chee, Joe, Peter (2nd place)
June 5, 2013	Proving Ground challenge weapon(s)	Proving Ground challenge	Sent to Proving Ground	Sent to elimination challenge
June 5, 2013	Henry rifle	Fire one shot at a target from 60 yards. The two players whose shots are farthest from the center go to the elimination challenge.	Blake, Gabby, Kelly, Kyle, William	Blake, Kyle
June 5, 2013	Elimination challenge weapon(s)	Elimination challenge		Eliminated player
June 5, 2013	Smith & Wesson Model 686 revolver Volquartsen .22 rifle Ruger Security-Six revolver	Three trick shots from previous seasons: 1. Shoot a beer bottle from 30 feet, holding the weapon upside down. (Model 686; 3 shots, 1 point each); 2. From 35 feet, shoot a gumball without hitting the golf tee on which it sits. (Volquartsen; 3 shots, 1 point each); 3. Shoot a pair of plates simultaneously from 25 feet. (Two Rugers; 3 shots, 2 points for each pair hit); Higher total score wins.		Blake

^1 Blake and Kyle tied with 3 points each. The gumball shot was randomly chosen to be replayed as the tiebreaker, and Kyle won 1-0.

The trainer for the squad and elimination challenges was Taran Butler, national/world shotgun champion.

=== Episode 3: "Pick Your Poison" ===
Premiere date	Individual challenge weapon(s)	Individual challenge		Winning player(s)
June 12, 2013	SIG Sauer P229 pistol	Two players compete at a time. For each matchup, one name is drawn at random; that player chooses his/her opponent. Shoot 3 targets at 30/50/75 feet. First player in each pair to hit all targets is safe from elimination; fastest time wins a sleeping bag.		Brian, Chris, Gary, Jamie, Kelly (winner), Kyle, Phil
June 12, 2013	Proving Ground challenge weapon(s)	Proving Ground challenge	Sent to Proving Ground	Sent to elimination challenge
June 12, 2013	SIG Sauer P229 pistol	Fire one shot at a target from 50 feet. The two players who hit farthest from the center of the bullseye go to the elimination challenge.	Adam, Alex, Chee, Gabby, Joe, Peter, William	Chee, Gabby
June 12, 2013	Elimination challenge weapon(s)	Elimination challenge		Eliminated player
June 12, 2013	Schofield Revolver	Shoot 4 rows of 6 targets each from 35 feet. Target size decreases from 9 inches (top row) to 5.5 inches (bottom row). All targets on a row must be shot without a miss to close it out. First player to close out all rows wins.		Chee

The players practiced without a trainer for the individual and elimination challenges.

=== Episode 4: "Crank Trigger" ===
Premiere date	Individual challenge weapon(s)	Individual challenge		Winning player(s)
June 19, 2013	Longbow	Fire arrows at a 30-foot target from 100 yards. Hits on the main bullseye score 20-50 points based on point of impact; two small targets at the far corners award 100 points per hit. Each player has 45 seconds to fire as many arrows as possible. Highest score wins a Red Head compound bow; top nine scores are safe from elimination.		Adam, Brian, Chris, Gabby, Gary (winner), Joe, Kelly, Peter, Phil
June 19, 2013	Proving Ground challenge weapon(s)	Proving Ground challenge	Sent to Proving Ground	Sent to elimination challenge
June 19, 2013	Steyr SSG08 rifle with scope	Fire one shot at a target from 200 yards. The two players farthest from the center go to the elimination challenge.	Alex, Jamie, Kyle, William	Jamie, Kyle
June 19, 2013	Elimination challenge weapon(s)	Elimination challenge		Eliminated player
June 19, 2013	1877 "Bulldog" Gatling gun	Fire at 3 telephone poles from 15/20/25 yards, trying to cut through them. First to bring down every pole wins.		Kyle

The trainer for the individual challenge was Chris Palmer, longbow and traditional archery expert. The trainer for the elimination challenge was Garry James, former Army ordnance officer.

=== Episode 5: "Shooting Dice" ===
Premiere date	Squad challenge weapon(s)	Squad challenge		Winning player(s)
June 26, 2013	Remington Model 1875 revolver	Players are split into two 6-member squads. Squad leaders are chosen at random, then pick their teammates after the practice session. Pairs of players (one per squad) go head-to-head at 6 stations, shooting at separate sets of targets arranged to resemble the 6 faces of a die. At each station, the revolver is pre-loaded with one round for every target; any additional rounds must be loaded by hand. A station ends when one player hits all of his/her targets. The squad with the higher total number of hits is safe from elimination; every member of that squad wins an Ascend backpack.		Adam, Chris, Jamie, Peter, Phil, William
June 26, 2013	Proving Ground challenge weapon(s)	Proving Ground challenge	Sent to Proving Ground	Sent to elimination challenge
June 26, 2013	Volquartsen .22 rifle	From 25 feet, fire through the center hole of a compact disc without touching the plastic. Three attempts per player; 1 point per successful shot. Lowest two scores go to the elimination challenge.	Alex, Brian, Gabby, Gary, Joe, Kelly	Alex, Gabby
June 26, 2013	Elimination challenge weapon(s)	Elimination challenge		Eliminated player
June 26, 2013	Ruger 10/22 rifle	From 50 feet, players fire simultaneously at separate sets of 100 targets. Higher number of targets hit in 2 minutes wins.		Gabby

^2 Alex, Gabby, and Joe tied for last place with 0 points. For the tiebreaker, each fired one shot at a target from 75 feet, and the two players who hit farthest from the center went to the elimination challenge.

The players practiced without a trainer for the squad and elimination challenges.

=== Episode 6: "The Mile Shot" ===
Premiere date	Individual challenge weapon(s)	Individual challenge		Winning player(s)
July 10, 2013	Barrett MRAD rifle (with .338 Lapua Magnum cartridge)	Shoot a 40-inch target at 1 mile. Fastest time wins an Oculus rifle scope; the 7 fastest times are safe from elimination.		Adam, Chris, Gary, Jamie (winner), Kelly, Phil, William
July 10, 2013	Proving Ground challenge weapon(s)	Proving Ground challenge	Sent to Proving Ground	Sent to elimination challenge
July 10, 2013	Henry rifle (chosen in a random draw)	Fire one shot at a target from 60 yards. The three whose shots are farthest from the center go to the elimination challenge.	Alex, Brian, Joe, Peter	Alex, Brian, Peter
July 10, 2013	Elimination challenge weapon(s)	Elimination challenge		Eliminated player
July 10, 2013	Atlatl	Throw at three 4-foot targets from 30/45/60 feet. Points are scored based on range and distance to center of the target. Lowest score after 3 rounds is eliminated.		Alex

^3 The .338 Lapua Magnum was developed for ultra long-range sniper operations in the Afghanistan and Iraqi Wars. The .338 Lapua bullet can take between 3 and 4 seconds to travel the mile distance to the target.
^4 The Henry Rifle was changed into the famous Winchester 1866 lever-action rifle. This brass-framed .44 caliber lever-action rifle can fire 28 rounds per minute.
^5 Alatls require skill rather than muscle power. This allowed women and children to participate in hunting. The darts resemble large arrows or thin spears and can be from 4 to 9 feet in length and 3/8" to 5/8" in diameter. Scientists speculate that the atlatl is responsible for the extinction of the woolly mammoth.
^6 Peter scored 12 points to win the challenge and receive the $2,000 Bass Pro Shops gift card. Alex and Brian tied with 8 points each, so they played a 2-round tiebreaker between themselves. They tied again 3-3 and played one more round, which Brian won 4-2.

The trainers for the individual challenge were George Reinas, season 2 contestant, and Craig "Sawman" Sawyer, Navy SEALs instructor and former sniper. The trainer for the elimination challenge was Jack Dagger, primitive weapons expert.

=== Episode 7: "Thread the Needle" ===
Premiere date	Individual challenge weapon(s)	Individual challenge		Winning player(s)
July 17, 2013	Ruger Security-Six revolver	While strapped to a vertical wheel in one of 8 positions, fire one shot at a 12-inch target from 35 feet. Each player spins a second, smaller wheel to determine his position, then is strapped in and spun through 3 full revolutions before firing. Closest shot to the center wins a Johnny Morris fishing rod and reel; the 6 closest are safe from elimination.		Chris (winner), Joe, Kelly, Peter, Phil, William
July 17, 2013	Proving Ground challenge weapon(s)	Proving Ground challenge	Sent to Proving Ground	Sent to elimination challenge
July 17, 2013	Colt Peacemaker revolver (chosen in a random draw)	Fire one shot at a target from 40 feet. The two shots farthest from the center go to the elimination challenge.	Adam, Brian, Gary, Jamie	Gary, Jamie
July 17, 2013	Elimination challenge weapon(s)	Elimination challenge		Eliminated player
July 17, 2013	Beretta 92F pistol	From 25 feet, players fire through separate sets of 7 tubes, ranging in diameter from 4 inches to 1.5 inches. First to hit all tubes wins.		Jamie

The players practiced without a trainer for the individual and elimination challenges.

=== Episode 8: "Familiar Foes" ===
Premiere date	Squad challenge weapon(s)	Squad challenge		Winning player(s)
July 24, 2013	Volquartsen TSS-5 .22 rifle Schofield Revolver	Three trick shots from past seasons: 1. From 75 feet, shoot the opener on a soda bottle to pop the cap off. (Volquartsen; 3 shots, 1 point each); 2. Shoot a cotton swab at 25 feet. (Volquartsen; 3 shots, 1 point each); 3. Throw a soda can into the air so that it passes under a rope, then shoot it before it hits the ground. (Schofield; 3 shots, 2 points each); Players are split into three 3-person squads, with each member trying a different shot. All members of the highest-scoring squad win a Red Head hunting knife; lowest total goes to the Proving Ground.		Peter, Phil, William (winners); Brian, Gary, Joe (2nd place)
July 24, 2013	Proving Ground challenge weapon(s)	Proving Ground challenge	Sent to Proving Ground	Sent to elimination challenge
July 24, 2013	SIG Sauer P229 pistol (chosen in a random draw)	Fire one shot at a target from 50 feet. The two farthest from the center go to the elimination challenge.	Adam, Chris, Kelly	Adam, Kelly
July 24, 2013	Elimination challenge weapon(s)	Elimination challenge		Eliminated player
July 24, 2013	1.65-inch Hotchkiss mountain gun (firing 1-lb aluminum projectiles)	Fire at separate sets of 3 targets from 180/200/220 yards. First to hit all targets wins.		Kelly

The trainer for the squad challenge was Taran Butler, national/world shotgun champion. The trainer for the elimination challenge was Rick Pohlers, cannon expert.

=== Episode 9: "Big Boom" ===
Premiere date	Squad challenge weapon(s)	Squad challenge		Winning player(s)
July 31, 2013	Benelli M4 shotgun (loaded with slugs); Benelli Vinci shotgun (loaded with birdshot)	Players are split into four pairs. From 50 feet, one player fires the M4 to hit an 8-inch moving target, launching two clay pigeons for the other player to hit with the Vinci. The two players switch weapons after each launch. To determine the pairings, four players are selected at random, then choose their teammates after the practice session. Both members of the pair with the most clays hit win an API tree stand; the two highest totals are safe from elimination.		Adam, William (winners); Gary, Peter (2nd place)
July 31, 2013	Proving Ground challenge weapon(s)	Proving Ground challenge	Sent to Proving Ground	Sent to elimination challenge
July 31, 2013	Walther P99 pistol	Fire one shot at a target from 50 feet. The two farthest from the center go to the elimination challenge.	Brian, Chris, Joe, Phil	Joe, Phil
July 31, 2013	Elimination challenge weapon(s)	Elimination challenge		Eliminated player
July 31, 2013	BowTech StrykeZone 380 crossbow	Fire at separate rotating wheels of six 8-inch targets from 90 feet. First to hit all targets wins.		Joe

The players practiced without a trainer for the squad challenge. The trainer for the elimination challenge was Chris Brackett, archery expert.

=== Episode 10: "Zip or Ship" ===
Premiere date	Individual challenge weapon(s)	Individual challenge	Winning player	Eliminated player
August 14, 2013	Heckler & Koch SP89 pistol (based on the MP5 design)	One at a time, fire at a circle of twenty 12-inch targets from 35 feet while strapped to the end of a 16-foot rotating vertical arm. Players are given one full revolution to get up to speed, then have a second revolution to fire at the targets using one 30-round magazine. Highest number of hits is safe and wins a Bob Timberlake wheeled bag; lowest number is eliminated immediately; the other five go to the Proving Ground.	William	Adam
August 14, 2013	Proving Ground challenge weapon(s)	Proving Ground challenge	Sent to Proving Ground	Sent to elimination challenge
August 14, 2013	M1A rifle	Fire one shot at a target from 200 yards. The two farthest from the center go to the elimination challenge.	Brian, Chris, Gary, Peter, Phil	Brian, Peter
August 14, 2013	Elimination challenge weapon(s)	Elimination challenge		Eliminated player
August 14, 2013	Browning Hi-Power pistol	While riding down a zip-line, fire at 10 targets on alternating sides; maximum 14 rounds per player. Higher number of hits wins.		Peter

The players practiced without a trainer for the individual and elimination challenges.

=== Episode 11: "A Game of Horse" ===
Premiere date	Individual challenge weapon(s)	Individual challenge		Winning player
August 21, 2013	M1919 Browning machine gun	While riding in the back of an M2A1 halftrack, fire at 15 targets along the course. Targets range from 12 to 25 inches in size and are placed at distances up to 100 feet. Maximum 100 rounds per player. Highest number of hits is safe and wins a Gore-Tex rain suit; all others go to the Proving Ground.		Phil
August 21, 2013	Proving Ground challenge weapon(s)	Proving Ground challenge	Sent to Proving Ground	Sent to elimination challenge
August 21, 2013	Colt M1877 double-action revolver, fired in single action	Fire one shot at a target from 50 feet. Only the shot closest to the center is safe.	Brian, William, Chris, Gary	William, Chris, Brian
August 21, 2013	Elimination challenge weapon(s)	Elimination challenge		Eliminated player
August 21, 2013	Longbow; Handguns: Colt Peacemaker revolver, Browning Hi-Power pistol Long Guns: LaRue Tactical Optimized Battle Rifle, Henry Rifle, Benelli M4 shotgun	Players take turns choosing a weapon, target, stance, and distance; all three players try every shot. No weapon or target may be chosen more than once. After all weapons have been used, the lowest number of shots is eliminated.		William

^7 After the fifth round, Chris had made 3 shots to 1 each for Brian and William, guaranteeing the win. Both of them missed their final shot, forcing a two-round tiebreaker with each player choosing one weapon. Brian won 2–0.

The trainer for the individual challenge was Craig "Sawman" Sawyer, Navy SEALs instructor and former sniper. Instead of returning to the house for a celebratory dinner as in past seasons, the four finalists hiked into a nearby valley for a meal of MRE rations and spent the night camping in a tent.

=== Episode 12: "Last Man Standing" ===
No practice sessions were held in this episode. The winners from all four previous seasons returned to watch the final challenge.

Premiere date	Elimination challenge weapon(s)	Elimination challenge	Winning player(s)	Eliminated player
August 28, 2013	AK-47 assault rifle	Run a course with 4 obstacles, shooting a target at 75 yards after each one: a 20-foot tunnel, then 25-foot crawls through a trench filled with water and logs, under camouflage netting, and through a sand pit under barbed wire. Shooters carry the rifle through the course, loading it with a dummy magazine before each obstacle and exchanging for a live one at each shooting station. Fastest time to hit all targets wins an Oculus spotting scope; the slowest time is eliminated.	Phil, Chris, Gary	Brian
August 28, 2013	Glock 19 pistol Heckler & Koch HK93 rifle (based on the HK43); Mosin–Nagant rifle SVT-40 rifle	Run uphill to a series of 4 elevated platforms, using a different weapon to shoot a target at each: 50 feet (Glock), 100 yards (HK93), 125 yards (Mosin–Nagant), 150 yards (SVT-40). Slowest time to hit all targets is eliminated.	Phil, Chris	Gary
August 28, 2013	Final challenge weapon(s)	Final challenge	Eliminated player	Top Shot
August 28, 2013	Remington 1875 revolver Ruger 10/22 carbine Schofield Revolver; BowTech Stryker crossbow SVT-40 rifle Beretta 92F pistol Hotchkiss mountain gun	Run a course with 7 shooting stations: 1. Hit 6 targets at 35 feet (Remington).; 2. Cross a 20-foot rope line, then shoot 20 bottles at 50 feet (Ruger).; 3. Shoot two rows of 6 targets each at 35 feet (7" and 6"); all targets in a row must be shot without a miss to close it out (Schofield).; 4. Hit 3 targets on a rotating wheel at 30 yards (BowTech).; 5. Shoot 1 target at 150 yards (SVT-40).; 6. Fire through a 2-inch-diameter tube at 25 feet (Beretta).; 7. Hit a 40-inch target at 200 yards (Hotchkiss).; First to complete all stations wins.	Chris	Phil
