= Top Shot season 1 =

Top Shot
- Season 1
- Region 1 DVD cover
- No. of episodes: 10

Release
- Original network: History
- Original release: June 6 – August 15, 2010

Season chronology
- Next → Season 2

The first season of the History Channel television series Top Shot commenced airing on June 6, 2010, and concluded on August 15, 2010. The season contained ten episodes, and was filmed over a period of 33 days in the spring in Santa Clarita, California. The winner of the season was British ex-Army captain Iain Harrison.

Iain Harrison later appeared as a coach in Seasons 2, 3, and 4; J.J. Racaza appeared as a coach in Season 2; Kelly Bachand appeared as a coach in Season 4; and Blake Miguez appeared as a coach in Season 2.

Chris Cerino, Peter Palma, Kelly Bachand, Adam Benson, and Blake Miguez returned for Top Shot: All-Stars. Miguez finished in 15th, Bachand finished in 9th, Benson finished in 7th, and Palma finished in 6th, while Cerino was the season's runner-up. According to Colby Donaldson's Twitter, J.J Racaza became a father during filming and was unable to come out for the show.

== Contestants ==
Contestant	Occupation / background	Original Team	Merged Team	Eliminated
Mike Seeklander; 38, Owasso, OK	U.S. Shooting Academy, former Marine, Federal Air Marshal and firearms instructor	Red Team		16th Place
Frank Campana; 47, Yonkers, NY	Retired police officer, FBI-certified sniper and instructor	Red Team		15th Place
Bill Carns; 40, Pahrump, NV	Radio Gun Show Host, qualified 5-Weapons Range Master	Red Team		14th Place
James "Jim" Sinclair; 48, Dover, NH	Printer, Gunsmith, Truck Driver, Historical firearms collector, competition shooter with various awards	Blue Team		13th Place
Caleb Giddings; 27, Fishers, IN	Insurance sales, former Coast Guard, competition shooter with various awards, blogger	Blue Team		12th Place
Andre Robinson; 28, Pittsburgh, PA	Soldier, U.S. Army, former Marine, earned "Rifle Expert" status in four competitions	Red Team		11th Place
Brad Engmann; 26, San Francisco, CA	Project Manager, USPSA Grand Master	Red Team		10th Place
Tara Poremba; 36, Chicago, IL	Police officer, state champ in several states in conventional pistol, and a former National Champion, competition shooter with various awards.	Blue Team		9th Place
Denny Chapman; 41, Ocala, FL	Cowboy Mounted Shooting competitor, horse trainer, Wild West entertainer, former benchrest rifle and USPSA/IPSC three-gun competitor	Red Team		8th Place
Blake Miguez; 28, New Iberia, LA	Corporate lawyer, semi-professional shooter, USPSA Grand Master, Louisiana state champion	Blue Team	Green Team	7th Place
Adam Benson; 44, Baltimore, MD	Construction project manager, former Marine, USPSA Master	Blue Team	Green Team	6th Place
Kelly Bachand; 22, Kent, WA	Student, competition shooter, USA National Rifle Team	Red Team	Green Team	5th Place
Peter Palma; 29, Norristown, PA	Plumber, Marine Scout Sniper	Red Team	Green Team	4th Place
Simon "J.J." Racaza; 29, New Milford, NJ	Department of Homeland Security Agent, double grandmaster in the USPSA/IPSC	Blue Team	Green Team	3rd Place
Chris Cerino; 40, Wadsworth, OH	Law enforcement trainer, 42nd place in the International Law Enforcement Educators and Trainers Association	Blue Team	Green Team	2nd place
Iain Harrison; 42, Sherwood, OR	Construction manager, former British Army platoon commander, gunsmith, competition shooter with various awards	Blue Team	Green Team	Winner

== Contestant progress ==
#	Contestants	Episodes												
#	Contestants	1	2	3	4	5	6	7	8	9		10		
1	Iain	WIN	WIN	WIN	NOM	SAFE	WIN	WIN	WIN	SAFE	SAFE	WIN	WIN	TOP SHOT
2	Chris	WIN	WIN	WIN	SAFE	SAFE	WIN	WIN	WIN	SAFE	SAFE	BTM2	SAFE	SECOND PLACE
3	J.J.	WIN	WIN	WIN	SAFE	SAFE	WIN	WIN	WIN	SAFE	WIN	WIN	OUT	
4	Peter	SAFE	SAFE	SAFE	WIN	WIN	SAFE	SAFE	NOM	WIN	SAFE	OUT		
5	Kelly	NOM	SAFE	SAFE	WIN	WIN	NOM	NOM	SAFE	BTM2	OUT			
6	Adam	WIN	WIN	WIN	SAFE	NOM	WIN	WIN	WIN	WIN	OUT			
7	Blake	WIN	WIN	WIN	SAFE	SAFE	WIN	WIN	WIN	OUT				
8	Denny	SAFE	SAFE	SAFE	WIN	WIN	SAFE	SAFE	OUT					
9	Tara	WIN	WIN	WIN	SAFE	SAFE	WIN	WIN	QUIT					
10	Brad	SAFE	NOM	NOM	WIN	WIN	SAFE	OUT						
11	Andre	SAFE	SAFE	SAFE	WIN	WIN	OUT							
12	Caleb	WIN	WIN	WIN	SAFE	OUT								
13	Jim	WIN	WIN	WIN	OUT									
14	Bill	SAFE	SAFE	OUT										
15	Frank	SAFE	OUT											
16	Mike	OUT												

The player's team (episodes 1–8) won the challenge.
The player(s) won individually in the challenge.
The player's team lost the challenge, but the player was not nominated for elimination (episodes 1–8); or the player did not finish a challenge at the top or bottom of the group (episodes 9–10).
The player was nominated for elimination, but won an elimination challenge (episodes 1–8); or the player finished a challenge at the bottom of the group, but won a tiebreaker (episodes 9–10).
The player lost an elimination challenge and was eliminated. (In episodes 9 and 10, every challenge ended in one or more automatic eliminations.)
The player voluntarily withdrew from the competition.
The player won the $100,000 grand prize and the title of Top Shot.
The player came in second.

== Episodes ==
=== Episode 1: "The Long Shot" ===
Premiere date	Team challenge weapon(s)	Team challenge	Benched player(s)	Winning team
June 6, 2010	19th/20th Century Rifles; M1903 Springfield; SVT-40; Mosin–Nagant 91/30; M14	Obstacle course/relay race with four shooting stations, one rifle per station and targets at 50/100 yards using iron sights. Each team splits into four pairs, with each player shooting one target and spotting the other.	None	Blue Team
June 6, 2010	Elimination challenge weapon(s)	Elimination challenge	Nominated for elimination	Eliminated player
June 6, 2010	Scoped Remington 700 sniper rifle	Shooting targets at 200/400/600 yards	Mike, Kelly	Mike

The trainer for both challenges was Craig Sawyer, Navy SEALs instructor and former sniper.

=== Episode 2: "Zipline of Fire" ===
Premiere date	Team challenge weapon(s)	Team challenge	Benched player(s)	Winning team
June 13, 2010	Beretta 92F 9×19mm pistol	Shooting through seven tubes of decreasing diameter (4 inches to 1.5 inches), one player per tube, one shot per turn. Distance not stated, but described (for the smallest tube) as the equivalent of hitting a US quarter from 25 feet.	Blake	Blue Team
June 13, 2010	Elimination challenge weapon(s)	Elimination challenge	Nominated for elimination	Eliminated player
June 13, 2010	Beretta 92F 9×19mm pistol	Shooting targets while riding down a zip-line; maximum 15 shots per player	Frank, Brad	Frank

The trainer for the team challenge was Ben Stoeger, practical shooting expert. The trainer for the elimination challenge was Matt Burkett, practical shooting expert.

^1 There was a second-place tie between Brad and Bill. It was broken by Peter's vote.
^2 Frank and Brad finished in a tie after the first run, but Frank lost on a tiebreaker run.

=== Episode 3: "Archer Enemies" ===
Premiere date	Team challenge weapon(s)	Team challenge	Benched player(s)	Winning team
June 20, 2010	Fiberglass version of an English longbow rated at 40 lbs.	Shooting at a 30-foot target from 100 yards, 30 seconds per player. Closest arrow to the center of the bullseye wins the challenge.	Adam, Chris	Blue Team
June 20, 2010	Elimination challenge weapon(s)	Elimination challenge	Nominated for elimination	Eliminated player
June 20, 2010	Modern hunting crossbow with scope	Shoot apples on stands at 10/20/30/40 yards. A recreation of the William Tell legend.	Brad, Bill	Bill

The trainer for the team challenge was Chris Palmer, longbow and traditional archery expert. The trainer for the elimination challenge was Bill Troubridge, crossbow expert.

=== Episode 4: "Friend or Foe?" ===
Premiere date	Team challenge weapon(s)	Team challenge	Benched player(s)	Winning team
June 27, 2010	AR-15 rifle	Shooting at a grid of red and blue targets, one player at a time. Each player sees the grid for 30 seconds before it is covered up, then has 20 seconds to fire up to 7 shots and hit only the other team's targets.	Blake, J.J., Iain	Red Team
June 27, 2010	Elimination challenge weapon(s)	Elimination challenge	Nominated for elimination	Eliminated player
June 27, 2010	South African TZ99 pistol	Fire up to 4 shots at swinging targets in 15 seconds, trying to hit the red "foes" and avoid the blue "friends."	Iain, Jim	Jim

The trainer for both challenges was Craig Sawyer, Navy SEALs instructor and former sniper.

=== Episode 5: "The Good, the Rat and the Ugly" ===
Premiere date	Team challenge weapon(s)	Team challenge	Benched player(s)	Winning team
July 11, 2010	Kentucky rifle	Shooting targets at 25/50/75/100/125 yards, one target per player, head-to-head at each distance. Closer shot to the center of the bullseye wins that distance for the team.	Adam, Chris	Red Team
July 11, 2010	Elimination challenge weapon(s)	Elimination challenge	Nominated for elimination	Eliminated player
July 11, 2010	Winchester Model 1873 rifle	Sever a rope with weights suspended from it, loading 3 rounds at a time. Based on Old West accounts of a superior marksman's ability to cut a hangman's noose by shooting through it.	Caleb, Adam	Caleb

The trainer for both challenges was Garry James, historical rifle expert.

=== Episode 6: "Wild, Wild West" ===
Premiere date	Team challenge weapon(s)	Team challenge	Benched player(s)	Winning team
July 18, 2010	Colt Peacemaker revolver	Fire at 50 targets set up in a shooting gallery styled after an Old West storefront, 10 rounds per player per turn. Shorter time to hit all targets wins the challenge.	Blake	Blue Team
July 18, 2010	Elimination challenge weapon(s)	Elimination challenge	Nominated for elimination	Eliminated player
July 18, 2010	Colt Peacemaker revolver	From 25 feet, players take alternating shots at a deck of 52 playing cards arranged on a wheel, trying to make the highest possible poker hand. Maximum 7 shots per player; neither one may use any cards shot by the other.	Kelly, Andre	Andre

The trainer for both challenges was Spencer Hoglund, historical weapons expert and four-time national champion speed shooter.

^3 There was a second-place tie between Denny and Andre. It was broken by Brad's vote.
^4 Both players tied in the first round by making a royal flush. For the tiebreaker, each was allowed only 5 shots and could not use any cards shot in the first round. After 4 shots, Kelly hit three fives, making it impossible for Andre to win as he only had a pair of fours at that point.

=== Episode 7: "Trick Shot Showdown" ===
Premiere date	Team challenge weapon(s)	Team challenge	Benched player(s)	Winning team
July 25, 2010	Winchester Model 1873 rifle Smith & Wesson M&P Revolver; Schofield Revolver	Recreations of famous trick shots: 1. Fire the Winchester over the shoulder to hit a soda bottle, sighting the target with a hand mirror.; 2. Using the M&P, hit the head of a nail driven partway into a board from 25 feet.; 3. Throw a soda can into the air and hit it with a shot from the Schofield.; 4. Same as 3, but using a smaller soda can.; One player per trick shot, three attempts each.	Adam, J.J.	Blue Team
July 25, 2010	Elimination challenge weapon(s)	Elimination challenge	Nominated for elimination	Eliminated player
July 25, 2010	Beretta Xtrema 2 shotgun	Throw clay pigeon targets into the air and shoot them, starting with one at a time and working up to five. In each round, the shotgun is loaded with one shell for every target being thrown.	Kelly, Brad	Brad

The trainer for the team challenge was Jon "Trick Shot" Wilson. The trainer for the elimination challenge was Scott Robertson, eight-time sporting clay shooting champion.

=== Episode 8: "The Razor's Edge" ===
Premiere date	Team challenge weapon(s)	Team challenge	Benched player(s)	Winning team
August 1, 2010	Throwing knife based on design of the Bowie knife	Throw at 6 targets from 11 feet, while balancing over a mud pit on a beam whose width decreases from one target to the next. Maximum of two throws per player per turn; each target must be hit before the next can be attempted. Shorter time to hit all targets wins the challenge.	Blake, Chris, Tara	Blue Team
August 1, 2010	Elimination challenge weapon(s)	Elimination challenge	Nominated for elimination	Eliminated player
August 1, 2010	Modern slingshot	From 20 feet, fire up to 20 shots at a grid of 8/10/12-inch square targets in 60 seconds, trying to hit only the targets of the assigned color.	Denny, Peter	Denny

The trainer for the team challenge was Todd Abrams, member of the International Knife Throwers Hall of Fame. The trainer for the elimination challenge was John "Chief AJ" Huffer, slingshot world record holder.

Tara received news of her father's rapidly declining health (due to lung cancer) and withdrew from the competition after the team challenge. A note at the end of Episode 10 stated that he has since died.

=== Episode 9: "The Shortest Fuse" ===
At the start of this episode, Donaldson announced that the teams were being dissolved, and that all players would compete head-to-head to determine who would be eliminated in each challenge. The seven remaining players were given green shirts to wear for the rest of the competition.

Premiere date	Elimination challenge weapon(s)	Elimination challenge	Winning player(s)	Eliminated player(s)
August 8, 2010	Beretta 92F 9×19mm pistol	From 25 feet, shoot and break a burning fuse on an explosive charge; maximum 10 rounds per player. Failure to break the fuse (or shortest length of unburned fuse, if all break it) leads to elimination.	Peter, Adam	Blake
August 8, 2010	TZ99 pistol Heckler and Koch HK93 rifle Mosin–Nagant 91/30 rifle SVT-40 rifle	Run uphill and stop at four shooting stations, with one weapon and one target at each (50 feet for the TZ99, then 100/125/150 yards for the rifles). Players must load and clear the weapons themselves. The two slowest times to hit all four targets are eliminated.	J.J.	Adam, Kelly

The trainer for the second elimination challenge was Craig Sawyer, Navy SEALs instructor and former sniper.

^5 In the first round, Iain, Blake, Kelly, J.J, and Chris failed to break the fuse. A tiebreaker was played under the same rules, with only Kelly and Blake failing this time. For the second tiebreaker, each player had 10 seconds to fire one shot at a target; the one who hit closer to the center of the bullseye stayed in the game.

=== Episode 10: "Season Finale" ===
No practice sessions were held in this episode. The five individual players eliminated prior to the final challenge returned to watch it.

Premiere date	Elimination challenge weapon(s)	Elimination challenge	Winning player(s)	Eliminated player(s)
August 15, 2010	Beretta 92F 9×19mm pistol	Two players at a time shoot at 12 double-sided targets from 35 feet, trying to flip as many of them to the assigned color as possible in 60 seconds (maximum 40 rounds per player). The two losers play against each other, with the loser of this round being eliminated.	J.J., Iain, Chris	Peter
August 15, 2010	Rifles: Mosin–Nagant 91/30, SVT-40, HK93; Handguns: TZ99 pistol, Schofield Revolver, Smith & Wesson M&P Revolver	Each player chooses one weapon, target, distance, and shooting stance. All three players try each shot; the one who makes the fewest shots is eliminated. No weapon or target may be chosen more than once. Targets available include shot glasses, bottles, beer mugs, glass panes, and jars.	Iain, Chris	J.J.
August 15, 2010	Throwing knife English longbow replica Colt Peacemaker revolver Winchester Model 1873 rifle Beretta 92F 9×19mm pistol AR-15 rifle M14 rifle	Players run a course with seven shooting stations: 1. Throw a knife to hit a target at 11 feet.; 2. Using the longbow, hit a target at 50 yards.; 3. Shoot five bottles at 25 feet with the Colt.; 4. Sever a rope at 35 feet with the Winchester.; 5. Fire the Beretta through a 1.5-inch-diameter (38 mm) tube at 25 feet.; 6. Use the AR-15 to hit six targets in a grid at 100 yards.; 7. Hit targets at 100 and 300 yards with the M14.; First player to complete all stations wins.	Iain	Chris

^6 J.J. and Iain were the first-round winners, and Chris won the playoff between himself and Peter.

==== Epilogue ====
The episode concluded with an epilogue revealing the recent activities and achievements of all 16 players, in order of their elimination.

- Mike Seeklander is competing at the World Speed Shooting Championships.
- Frank Campana is working part-time as a bodyguard.
- Bill Carns continues to work on his radio show. Kelly has been a recent guest.
- James "Jim" Sinclair recently won a national match with historic rifles.
- Caleb Giddings now works for the NRA.
- Andre Robinson has returned to his Army base in South Korea.
- Brad Engmann is now competing nationally with a new pistol. It is not a Glock.
- Tara Poremba's father died. She continues to compete in his honor.
- Denny Chapman won the Men's All-Around World Championships (Cowboy Action Shooting + Mounted Shooting) at the SASS "End of Trail" Finals in 2011.
- Blake Miguez is running his father's company, which is helping cleaning up the Gulf oil spill.
- Adam Benson is looking forward to the start of hunting season.
- Kelly Bachand has taken up pistol shooting. He returns to college in the fall.
- Peter Palma's time as a reservist is nearly over. He is considering a move to Louisiana.
- Simon "J.J." Racaza still holds the world record in the Iron Sight Division.
- Chris Cerino just moved into a new house and still works as a shooting instructor.
- Iain Harrison is back managing a construction company. So far he has no plans for his winnings.

== Nomination range ==
		Original Teams									Merged Team					
#	Episode	1	2	3	4	5	6	7	8		9			10		
#	Nominated	Kelly; 3/8 Votes	Brad; 3/7 Votes	Brad; 2/6 Votes	Iain; 5/8 Votes	Adam; 3/7 Votes	Kelly; 3/5 Votes	Kelly; 2/4 Votes	None	Peter; 1/3 Votes	None	None	None	None	None	None
#	Eliminated	Mike; 3/8 Votes	Frank; 3/7 Votes	Bill; 2/6 Votes	Jim; 2/8 Votes	Caleb; 3/7 Votes	Andre; 2/6 Votes	Brad; 2/4 Votes	Tara; No Votes	Denny; 2/3 Votes	Blake	Adam	Kelly	Peter	J.J.	Chris
#	Contestants	Votes														
1	Iain				None	Caleb			None		None	None	None	None	None	None
2	Chris				Iain	Caleb			None		None	None	None	None	None	None
3	J.J.				Jim	Adam			None		None	None	None	None	None	
4	Peter	Mike	Brad	Brad			Andre	Brad		Denny	None	None	None	None		
5	Kelly	Brad	Bill	Bill			Denny	Brad		Denny	None	None	None			
6	Adam				Iain	None			None		None	None				
7	Blake				Iain	Adam			None		None					
8	Denny	Brad	Frank	Bill			Kelly	Kelly		Peter						
9	Tara				Iain	Caleb			None							
10	Brad	Kelly	Frank	Andre			Kelly	Kelly								
11	Andre	Mike	Bill	Brad			Kelly									
12	Caleb				Jim	Adam										
13	Jim				Iain											
14	Bill	Kelly	Frank	Kelly												
15	Frank	Mike	Brad													
16	Mike	Kelly														
