= Brian Zins =

- Military career
- Allegiance: United States of America
- Branch: United States Marine Corps
- Service years: 1988–2008
- Rank: Gunnery Sergeant
- Awards: Navy & Marine Corps Commendation Medal; Meritorious Service Medal

Brian Zins (born Feb. 5, 1969, Youngstown, Ohio) is a U.S. firearms expert and competitive shooter, known for his proficiency with the M1911 pistol with which he holds various NRA records. He is also a retired United States Marine Corps Military Police Gunnery Sergeant.

== Early years ==
Brian Zins was raised in Canfield, Ohio. He grew up playing baseball and also learned how to juggle at a young age, both of which he credits for his good hand–eye coordination in shooting. After graduating from high school, Zins went to college to study Law Enforcement. However, he decided to quit and joined the United States Marine Corps in 1988.

== Military career ==
After completing the Recruit training program at Parris Island, South Carolina, Zins attended the Military Police School at Lackland Air Force Base, San Antonio, Texas. During that time, he received the Top Gun Award for having the highest qualification score with the M1911 pistol.

Through his career of 20 years at the Marine Corps, Zins served in various capacities, like:

- Primary Marksmanship Instructor
- Assigned to Weapons Training Battalion in Quantico, Virginia
- Permanent member of the Marine Corps Pistol Team
- Mobile Training Team at Camp Lejeune, North Carolina
- Military Police Patrol Supervisor, Watch Commander, and Hostage Rescue Team's designated marksman in Iwakuni, Japan (1994)
- Recruiter in the Detroit area for three years
- Doctrine developer with Marksmanship Program Management Section (2004)
- Staff Non-Commissioned Officer in Charge of the Pistol Team (2006 - 2008)

During that time, he participated in various competitions, setting several records.

- 1991, first Lance Corporal to become Pistol Distinguished
- 1992, 2nd Place at the NRA National Matches at Camp Perry, Ohio
- 1993–1994, 1st Place at the Inter-service Pistol Championship with the Pistol Team
- 2006, set National Records for the Center Fire 900 and Center Fire Timed Fire
- 2006, tied National Record for the .45 National Match Course
- 2006, 2nd Place at the NRA National Matches
- 2007, set National Record Score for Military Police Corps Trophy
- 12x National Pistol Champion (1996, 1998, 2001, 2002, 2003, 2004, 2005, 2007, 2008, 2010, 2012 and 2013)

Zins retired from the Marine Corps in May 2008.

== Post-military career ==
Since retiring from active duty, Zins has worked as National Manager of NRA Pistol Programs in the Competitive Shooting division. He also works as an independent security contractor. Zins also started his own line of ammunition called Gunny Zins Ammo. In 2011, he was hired by Cabot Gun Company as spokesman and ambassador. In 2012 he married Mary Jo Boomhower and they reside in Ohio. He has two children, Connor and Danielle and 3 stepchildren, Connor Loze, Laney Boggs, and Jacob Manente.

In 2017 Brian and Mary relocated to Monroe, North Carolina where he accepted a position as Training Director at Point Blank Range in Matthews, North Carolina. He oversees all training programs at Point Blank Range and conducts his Bulls-eye Competition class as well a 1911 – 101 course.

=== Top Shot ===
In 2011, Zins appeared in the second season of History Channel's marksmen competition Top Shot. During the first half of the competition, Zins competed as part of the Red Team. His team ended up winning six challenges, and Brian was never nominated for elimination during that period. During the final half of the competition, Zins won three of the last individual challenges before the final. In the final, he lost to Chris Reed.

In 2013, Zins appeared in the fifth season. He finished fourth overall out of 16 all-star contestants from previous seasons.
