= Blake Miguez =

American politician (born 1981)

- Miguez in 2026

Member of the Louisiana Senate from the 22nd district
- Incumbent
- Assumed office January 8, 2024
- Preceded by: Fred Mills

Majority Leader of the Louisiana House of Representatives
- In office January 12, 2020 – January 8, 2024
- Preceded by: Lance Harris
- Succeeded by: Mark Wright

Member of the Louisiana House of Representatives from the 49th district
- In office February 21, 2015 – January 8, 2024
- Preceded by: Simone Champagne
- Succeeded by: Jacob Landry

Personal details
- Born: Blake John Miguez; November 21, 1981 (age 44) Lafayette, Louisiana, U.S.
- Party: Republican
- Education: Louisiana State University (BA); Southern University (JD)
- Website: Campaign website

Blake John Miguez (born November 21, 1981) is an American politician who is a member of the Louisiana Senate. A Republican, he previously was in the Louisiana House of Representatives from Iberia and Vermilion parishes, and was chief administrative officer for the city of Youngsville, Lafayette Parish.

Miguez is a competitive shooter, a grand master of the United States Practical Shooting Association. He competed in the first season of the History Channel's marksmen competition Top Shot.

== Early life ==
Blake John Miguez was born on November 21, 1981, in Lafayette, Louisiana. He is a graduate of Catholic High School of New Iberia, Louisiana State University and Southern University Law School.

== Political career ==
He won a special election against John Robert Bering on February 21, 2015, to succeed Simone B. Champagne, who resigned to become the chief administrative officer for the city of Youngsville in Lafayette Parish.

Miguez has been supportive of "Don't say gay" legislation, including a bill written by Dodie Horton to limit discussion of sex, gender, and sexual orientation in classrooms.

In October 2023, Miguez was elected to the Louisiana Senate. In June 2025, Miguez announced that he would run for United States Senate against incumbent Bill Cassidy, citing the Cassidy's vote for the second impeachment of Donald Trump. On February 3, Miguez dropped out of the Senate race to run for the House of Representatives. Though not a resident of the House district, law only requires him to be a resident of the state, which he is. He is a member of the Louisiana Freedom Caucus.

In the midterm election on November 3, 2026, Miguez received 19.17% of the vote, but as the candidate with the second-most votes, this less-than-20% result still qualified him for a runoff election. Then, before that runoff election occurred, Miguez traveled to Washington, D.C. during the existing Congress’ lame duck session, and there joined in a public group photograph of newly elected Representatives on the Capitol steps - even before the people of Louisiana had decided he would actually be their Representative.

In March 2026, it was reported that a former girlfriend filed a police report accusing Miguez of rape in 2007, but she declined to press charges. The father of the accuser supported Miguez, writing in an email that his daughter "has a drug problem", though the father claimed that he had never read the police report.

In November 2026, despite not being duly elected to the Congress, Miguez flew to Washington, D.C. and was seen in photographs with members of the fresh class.

== Personal life ==
Miguez resides in New Iberia, Louisiana, according to a statement by Louisiana Attorney General Liz Murrill, and has described himself as a "lifelong resident of Iberia Parish, small business owner, world champion shooter, and Acadiana philanthropist". He is president of SeaTran Marine, which ferries crews to offshore oil platforms in the Gulf of Mexico, and a partner in the family-owned fuel supplier, Miguez Fuel.

Miguez started shooting at USPSA and the International Practical Shooting Confederation when he was twelve years old, and became a Grand Master at the age of seventeen. In the 2010 Top Shot competition, Miguez competed as part of the Blue Team, lasting until the first week of the final half of the competition. During one episode of the show's second season, Miguez appeared with J.J. Racaza as trainers for a challenge. In 2011, Miguez won his fourth consecutive title at the USPSA Area 4 Handgun Championship, and his seventh title in that tournament since 2003. In 2013, Miguez made a guest appearance on Top Shot season 5 episode, "The Mile Shot".

Louisiana House of Representatives
Preceded by Lance Harris	Majority Leader of the Louisiana House of Representatives; 2020–2024	Succeeded by Mark Wright
