= Athena Lee (markswoman) =

Filipino-American competition shooter

Personal information
- National team: USA (formerly Philippines)
- Born: Philippines
- Occupation(s): Oil company contractor, firearms instructor
Medal record
IPSC
Representing Philippines
IPSC Handgun World Shoot
Gold medal – first place	1999 Cabu	Open Lady
Silver medal – second place	2002 Pietersburg	Open Lady
Representing United States
Gold medal – first place	2008 Bali	Open Lady
IPSC US Handgun Championship
Gold medal – first place	2012 Frostproof	Lady Open

Athena Lee is a competition shooter and USPSA Master. She is also known for competing in the second season of History Channel's marksmen competition Top Shot.

== Career ==
Lee first got into shooting in December 1991, after going to the shooting range with her father, when he was practicing for the regional Steel Challenge in Philippines. After that, she has competed in several tournaments and matches throughout her career. She competed at the 1999 and 2002 World Shoots as part of the Philippines Ladies Team, winning gold. She also won the Steel Challenge in 2002 and 2003. In 2002, Lee's team won first place at the World Shoot XIII in South Africa. In 2007, she also won the USPSA Open Championship. In the IPSC World Shoot XV in Indonesia, Lee finished in first place among all women.

Other titles Lee has won are:

- 2-Time IPSC Handgun World Shoot Open Lady Champion (1999 & 2008)
- 2-Time Steel Challenge World Speed Shooting Open Lady Champion (2002 & 2003)
- 2-Time IPSC Australasia Handgun Championships Open Lady Champion (2001 & 2007)
- 2-Time USPSA Handgun Nationals Open Lady Champion

Lee moved to the United States in 2008, and competed for the American Shooting Team.

== Top Shot ==
In 2011, Lee appeared in the second season of History Channel's marksmen competition Top Shot. During the first half of the competition, Lee competed as part of the Red Team. Her team ended up winning the first challenge, but lost on the second week. Athena was eliminated during the second week of the competition.
