= Brad Engmann =

American competitive shooter

- Occupation: Project manager
- Known for: Competitive shooter, USPSA Grand Master

Brad Engmann is an American competitive shooter and USPSA Grand Master. He is also known for competing in the first season of History Channel's marksmen competition Top Shot.

== Biography ==
Engmann was born in the US and raised in San Francisco, California, where he resides now. He currently works as a project manager.

Engmann started shooting when he was thirteen years old, after asking his dad to take him to a local firing range. One of the first guns he would shoot was a Daisy Red Ryder. Engmann says he quit shooting for several years and dedicated himself to cars, until he discovered about the USPSA.

In 2010, Engmann appeared in the first season of History Channel's marksmen competition Top Shot. During the first half of the competition, Engmann competed as part of the Red Team. His team ended up winning two challenges during his tenure, and Brad was nominated for elimination three times. He was eliminated during the seventh week of the competition.
