= James Franks =

James or Jimmy Franks may refer to:

- James Franks (rugby union), Irish international rugby union player
- Jimmy Franks (ice hockey) (1914–1994), Canadian ice hockey goaltender
- Jimmy Pop (born 1972), born James Franks, US musician and Bloodhound Gang lead-singer
- Jimmy Franks Recording Company, record label owned by Jimmy Pop

== See also ==
- Jamie Franks (disambiguation)
