= Maggie Reese =

American sport shooter

Margaret Reese Voigt
- Known for: Professional shooter, USPSA Multigun Open division champion
- Website: maggiereeseshooting.com

Maggie Reese is a professional shooter and USPSA champion. She is also known for competing in the second season of History Channel's marksmen competition Top Shot.

In January 2016, Maggie married fellow competitive shooter, Michael Voigt.

== Biography ==
Reese currently resides in Chino, California. She is a professional shooter with more than 13 years of experience. Among the titles she has won are:

- 2009 and 2010 USPSA Multigun Ladies Open National Champion
- 2009 and 2010 Superstition Mountain Mystery 3-gun Ladies Open Champion
- 2010 Bianchi Cup 5th place Women's Overall

In 2011, Reese appeared in the second season of History Channel's marksmen competition Top Shot. During the first half of the competition, Reese competed as part of the Blue Team. Her team ended up winning one challenge before she was eliminated in the fourth week.
