= Caleb Giddings =

American competitive shooter and blogger

- Known for: Competitive shooter, blogger

Caleb Giddings is a competitive shooter and blogger. He is the founder of Gun Nuts Media, a website and blog among competitive shooters. He is also known for competing in the first season of History Channel's marksmen competition Top Shot.

== Biography ==
Giddings was born in California and lives in Sioux Falls, South Dakota. He currently works in the firearms industry. He is also a former insurance agent. As a cadet, he served on the shooting team at the United States Coast Guard Academy. In 2014 he returned to the military, joining the United States Air Force.

Giddings started shooting competitively while in college in the NRA Collegiate Pistol program. In 2006, he founded Gun Nuts Media, a website and blog for competitive shooters.

In 2010, Giddings appeared in the first season of History Channel's marksmen competition Top Shot. During the first half of the competition, Giddings competed as part of the Blue Team. His team ended up winning three challenges during his tenure, but Caleb was eliminated during the fifth week of the competition.

In 2011, GunUp hired Giddings as their Director of Community Relations.
