= Kelly Bachand =

American sports shooter

- Known for: Competitive shooter, member of the US National Rifle Team

Kelly Bachand is a competitive shooter and a member of the United States National Rifle Team. He is also known for competing in the first season of History Channel's marksmen competition Top Shot.

== Biography ==
Bachand was born in the US and lives in Kent, Washington.

In 2007, Bachand won gold as a firing member of the World Champion U21 USA Young Eagles. He also won the 2009 Canadian Target Rifle Championship and finished in first place in seven other competitions. He finally won the NW International Prone Championship and WA State 600 Yard Prone Championship.

In 2010, Bachand appeared in the first season of History Channel's marksmen competition Top Shot. During the first half of the competition, Bachand competed as part of the Red Team. His team ended up winning two challenges, and Bachand was nominated for elimination three times during that period, winning the elimination challenges. Bachand was eliminated during the second week of the final half of the competition.

That year, he also finished in the Top 10 at the United States LR Nationals, Fullbore Nationals, and 3rd Palma Individual Trophy Match.

Bachand was on the coaching staff for the 2011 USA Young Eagles Rifle Team on their trip to the World Long Range Championships in Brisbane, Australia. Bachand was also a shooter on the US Palma Team on the same trip. Bachand shot in the World Long Range Championships in both the Open and Under-25 categories. In the Open category Bachand finished 29th in the world and in the Under-25 category he finished second.

In 2012, Bachand appeared as an expert during one episode of the fourth season of Top Shot. He coached the contestants in how to shoot particularly long shots.

In 2013, Bachand competed in the fifth season of Top Shot, placing ninth.
