= Jamie Franks =

Jamie Franks may refer to:

- Jamie Franks (politician) (born 1972), Democratic member of the Mississippi House of Representatives
- Jamie Franks (soccer) (born 1986), American soccer player
- Jamie Franks (professional shooter)

== See also ==
- James Franks (disambiguation)
