= Iain Harrison =

- Occupation: Construction manager
- Known for: Competitive shooter, winner of Top Shot season 1

Iain Harrison is a competitive shooter and former British Army Captain. He is known for being the winner of the first season of History Channel's marksmen competition Top Shot and the current editor of RECOIL.

== Biography ==
Harrison was born in the United Kingdom. He served as a recce platoon commander for the British Army. He moved to the United States and started working as a construction manager in Sherwood, Oregon after being forced to surrender his guns to the UK government, while pursuing competitive shooting.

In 2009, Harrison finished second in Trooper Class in the 2009 MGM Ironman multi-gun competition. Being an amateur gunsmith, the guns he used during the competition were made by himself. Harrison worked for Crimson Trace at this time.

In December 2011, Harrison gained US citizenship.

Harrison became the editor of RECOIL in January 2013; he writes several articles for each issue as well.

=== Top Shot ===
In 2010, Harrison appeared in the first season of History Channel's marksmen competition Top Shot. During the first half of the competition, Harrison competed as part of the Blue Team. His team ended up winning six challenges, and Harrison was only nominated for elimination once during that period. During the final half of the competition, Harrison won the last two individual challenges before the final. In the finale, he beat Chris Cerino to win the competition as well as $100,000.

Harrison has since made three appearances on the show as a weapons trainer. His first appearance after winning was on the tenth episode of the second season of the show. During one episode of the third season of the show, Harrison appeared with Season 2 winner, Chris Reed, serving as honorary team captains of the two current Blue and Red teams for one of the challenges. A $5,000 donation was made to a charity selected by the captain of the winning team, and Harrison chose the Wounded Warrior Project. However, his team lost to Chris Reed's Red team. He appeared again as a trainer during the fourth season.
