= Recoil (magazine) =

RECOIL
- Editor: Iain Harrison
- Frequency: bi-monthly
- Circulation: 250,000
- Founded: 2012
- Company: Caribou Media Group
- Country: United States
- Based in: Los Angeles, California
- Website: www.recoilweb.com

Recoil is a magazine covering handguns, tactical rifles, tactical knives and other shooting-related activities in the United States. It caters to the firearms lifestyle.

The magazine primarily offers reviews on firearms, ammunition, knives, and shooting gear; as well as gunsmithing tips, historical articles, gun collecting, self-defense and automobiles. Each issue contains a few featured articles and personality profiles of people in the firearms industry as well as press releases of new products. Each issue includes a fold-out target.

Susannah Breslin of Forbes wrote that, "RECOIL is more Maxim than your dad's Guns & Ammo" with regard to the magazine's photography and subject matter. RECOIL debuted in January 2012 as a quarterly magazine and by December 2012 became bi-monthly.

Iain Harrison became editor in January 2013.

In 2015, RECOIL won “Best Outdoor Sports & Recreation Magazine” at the 64th Annual Western Publishing Association "Maggie Awards" for its July issue.
