= James Franks (rugby union) =

Irish rugby union player

- Full name: James Gordon Franks
- Born: 10 September 1875 Rathmines, Dublin, Ireland
- Died: 2 November 1941 (aged 66) Malahide, Dublin, Ireland
- University: Trinity College Dublin
- Occupation: Solicitor

Rugby union career
- Position: Forward
International career
Years	Team	Apps	(Points)
1898	Ireland	3	(0)

James Gordon Franks (10 September 1875 – 2 November 1941) was an Irish international rugby union player.

== Biography ==
A native of Dublin, Franks played varsity rugby while studying law at Trinity College Dublin. He was a Leinster Cup winner with Dublin University, where he earned colours his first season. In addition to rugby, Franks also rowed for the university's eights and fours. He played further rugby for Monkstown and was capped three times for Ireland, all during the 1898 Home Nations, but also undertook a tour of Canada with the national team.

Franks worked at a Dublin solicitor's firm for a number of years and later joined the Land Commission as a public trustee.

== See also ==
- List of Ireland national rugby union players
