= Chris Cheng =

American sport shooter

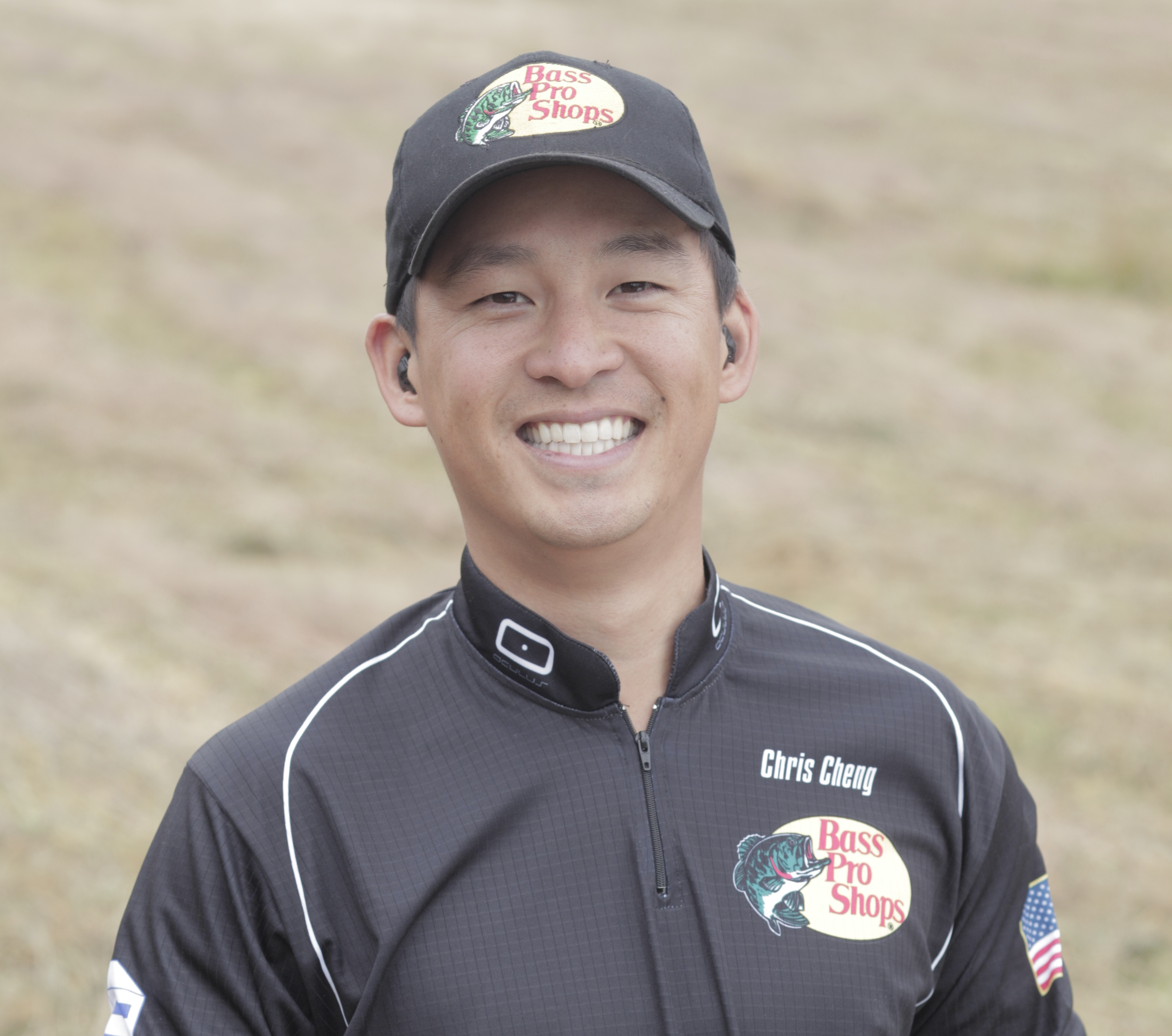
- Born: December 14, 1979 (age 46); Mission Viejo, California, U.S.
- Education: University of California, Los Angeles (B.A.); Monterey Institute of International Studies (M.A.)
- Occupations: Professional Marksman & Spokesman for Bass Pro Shops
- Known for: Season 4 Champion of History Channel's Top Shot competition
- Website: www.TopShotChris.com

Chris Cheng (born December 14, 1979, in Mission Viejo, California) is an American sport shooter and The History Channel's Top Shot Season 4 Champion. In 2012, along with the title of "Top Shot", Cheng won a $100,000 cash prize and a professional marksman contract with the show's sponsor, Bass Pro Shops.

== Background ==
Cheng was born to Maggie and Benjamin Cheng. His mother is Japanese Cuban and his father is Chinese American. He has a younger sister, Allison.

He attended the University of California, Los Angeles from 1998 to 2003 where he majored in Political Science, with a focus on American government and political media. He holds a master's degree in International Policy Studies from the Monterey Institute of International Studies where he specialized in conflict resolution and international negotiations and was President of his class. He is fluent in Spanish. Cheng also holds an Advanced Project Management certification from Stanford University.

Cheng is a member of Sigma Alpha Epsilon fraternity and was a re-founding father of his chapter at UCLA where he served in numerous leadership roles. He was the Grand Sweepstakes winner in UCLA's 2001 Spring Sing talent show competition. In 2003, Cheng served as co-chair of the 26-hour UCLA Dance Marathon where 2,000 students, faculty, and staff raised $54,000 for the Elizabeth Glaser Pediatric AIDS Foundation, which was noted as "one of the largest college fundraising events on the West Coast." Upon graduating in 2003, he was conferred with the "UCLA Chancellor's Service Award."

== Career ==
Cheng worked for Google Inc. from 2007 to 2012 in many capacities, primarily in technical support for Google Apps, as well as a product lead in Google.org's Google for Nonprofits Program. Chris served on the GoogleEDU leadership faculty where he trained teams and individuals on interpersonal communication and the fundamentals of leadership. He left Google in June 2012 to pursue his professional marksman contract full-time.

Cheng is an NRA News Commentator where he provides his opinions and commentary on a variety of issues. He also tours Bass Pro Shops across the country interacting with customers; shooting in Multi-Gun, USPSA, IDPA, and IPSC competitions, and working with the National Rifle Association of America and National Shooting Sports Foundation on promoting the shooting sport. Cheng is a Lifetime member of the National Rifle Association and is an NRA Certified Pistol, Rifle, and Shotgun Instructor.

Cheng's book "Shoot to Win" reveals how he trained to win Top Shot, as well as how he empowers himself to succeed in life. Cheng is a Staff Writer for The Firearm Blog where he writes about firearms and gear in his post-Top Shot experiences.

Cheng was featured in the Second Amendment documentary Assaulted: Civil Rights Under Fire (2013) alongside Ted Nugent and Ice-T. He was on 13 episodes of Top Shot Season 4, and was a special guest on the premiere and season finale of Top Shot Season 5: All-Stars.

Cheng is an inspirational public speaker, represented by The Harry Walker Agency.

Cheng's website and blog is at TopShotChris.com. His future career plans include running for public office.

Cheng produces a web series called Top Shot Chris Cheng that airs on CarbonTV.

Cheng joined the Board of Directors of the LGBTQ gun rights organization, Pink Pistols in January 2020. In a statement released to the public Cheng said of the decision to join Pink Pistols, "I am excited to bring my technology and business background to Operation Blazing Sword. The next chapter of queer rights has begun with more of our community realizing that the Second Amendment is a way for marginalized communities to protect ourselves from harm..." "Operation Blazing Sword" (another LGBTQ gun rights organization), merged with Pink Pistols in 2018.

== Other interests ==
Cheng is on the board of directors for the San Francisco Opera BRAVO! Club. He is also a volunteer baritone singer for the San Francisco Symphony Chorus. He played double bass from ages 13–22 in both orchestras and jazz bands.

He is a co-founder of Home for a Home, a nonprofit organization which collects donations from real estate brokers to build homes for those in need.

In December 2013 Cheng publicly came out as gay on his official blog. He did so in the hopes of breaking down stereotypes both about gay people and gun enthusiasts.

Preceded by Dustin Ellermann	Top Shot; Winner; Season 4 (2012)	Succeeded by Phil Morden
