= Chris Brackett =

American TV host

- Known for: Bow expert, host of Arrow Affliction

Chris Brackett is a professional archer, bow expert, and the former host of Arrow Affliction.

Brackett is from Bartonville, Illinois. He is the founder of Brackett Outdoors, which organizes several outdoor activities including bowfishing.

In 2008, Brackett hosted the show Arrow Affliction on Sportsman Channel. After that, he has served as a trainer in History Channel's Top Shot and has started other projects like Outdoor Channel's Fear No Evil, with Zac Brown.

In early 2016 Brackett achieved notoriety in social media and the outdoor press resulting from a Pittsburgh Post-Gazette article in which he was quoted claiming Chronic Wasting Disease is not fatal. (“There has never been an animal die of CWD,” Brackett said. “Never, never, never.”) He also attributed the source of CWD as being "...from nuclear testing out West," These claims were widely debunked.

In 2019, Brackett pleaded guilty in federal court to a poaching offense. Brackett had killed two bucks minutes apart during filming of an episode of his show. The state of Indiana permitted hunters to kill only one buck per season. Brackett admitted that he transported the second, 11-point buck to his home, while instructing his cameraman and producer to hide footage of the kill of the first, smaller eight-point buck. He was sentenced to 30 months of probation, during which he was banned from hunting worldwide, and agreed to pay $3,500 in restitution to the State of Indiana and to pay a $26,500 fine.
