= Jamie Franks (professional shooter) =

American sport shooter

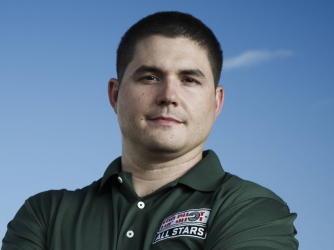

Jamie Franks is a US Navy Veteran and a competitive shooter known for being on the History Channel's marksmen competition show Top Shot. After performing well in Season 2, Franks was invited back to compete on Top Shot All-Stars where he most notably hit a 30 inch target at a distance of 1 mile (1760 yards) with a single cold-bore shot, in 30 seconds. Since competing on Top Shot, Franks has focused more on competitive shooting and has competed in multi gun, the NRA World Shooting Championships, and Precision Long-Range Rifle.

== Background ==
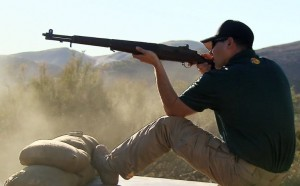

Jamie Franks grew up in a rural area outside of Raleigh, North Carolina, in a family of hunters and shooters on his family's tobacco farm. He spent much of his childhood exploring, hunting, and roaming the backwoods of the Southeastern United States. Even as a child, Franks aspired to a career in the military. From an early age his father would let him shoot various pistols, hunting rifles, and shotguns once he was old enough to handle them safely.

At age 6, Franks quickly became proficient with his first BB gun. A few years later he got his first .410 shotgun and a .22 rifle, eventually discovering a natural talent for shooting. He continued to acquire a few more firearms into his teenage years and challenged himself to practice and become a better shooter. He spent most of his free time in the local woods, target shooting and hunting small varmints and game animals.

== US Navy Career ==
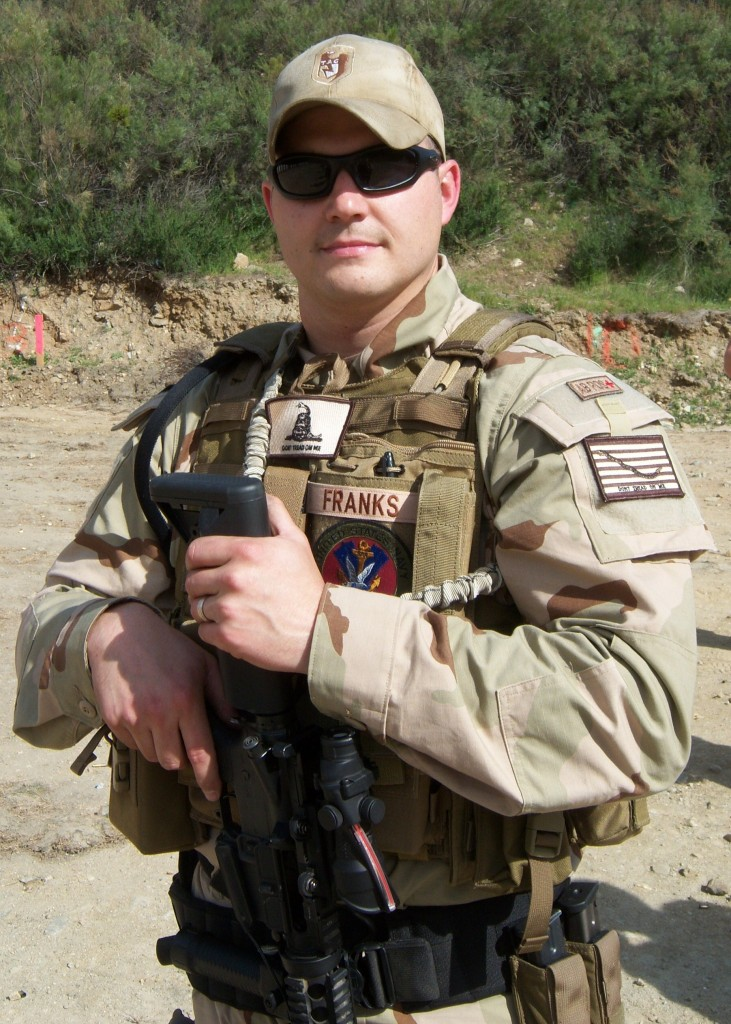

Inspired to serve his country by his grandfather, a WW2 Army combat veteran, Franks joined the Navy in 1997. Initially he trained as an Operations Specialist and later applied to and was accepted in the Navy SEAL's BUD/S program. He was unable to complete BUD/S for medical reasons. Franks finished the Navy Expeditionary Combat Skills and Practical Weapons courses and Anti-Terrorism Force Protection/Deadly Force Training. He continued to work as an Operations Specialist, Tactical Air Controller, and Navy Rescue Swimmer. Over the course of his career, Jamie served aboard USS HIGGINS (DDG-76), USS GEORGE PHILIP (FFG-12), USS SHILOH (CG-67), and USS RENTZ (FFG-46). He served as a Direct Support Sailor at SEAL Team THREE, and EOD Mobile Unit THREE, as well as tours where he served as a High Risk Training Instructor as both a Rescue Swimmer Instructor, and Water Survival Instructor. Jamie has completed 9 overseas deployments including combat tours in Afghanistan in 2009, 2010 and 2011. While in Afghanistan Franks was assigned to a Combined Joint Counter-IED task force (CJTF Paladin).

After Season 2 of Top Shot, Franks became the EOD Mobile Unit-3 SAILOR of the Year in 2010 as and was qualified to be an Expeditionary Small Arms Marksmanship Instructor (ESAMI) and instructed Intermediate Expeditionary Combat Skills (IECS) and Advanced Expeditionary Combat Skills (AECS) courses. In 2017 Franks was selected for advancement to Navy Chief Petty Officer.

In 2018, Franks applied to become a Navy Landing Craft Air Cushion (LCAC) Hovercraft Craftmaster / Pilot. In 2021 he was promoted to Senior Chief Petty Officer. After serving as an LCAC Craftmaster at Assault Craft Unit FIVE (ACU-5) at Camp Pendleton, CA for five years, he was assigned to serve as an LCAC Craftmaster Instructor.

On July 31, 2026, Senior Chief Jamie Franks will retire from his career in the U.S. Navy with over 28 years of service.

== Top Shot ==
In 2011, Jamie Franks appeared in Top Shot Season 2 on the History Channel. Franks was selected by the team captain and was a member of the Red team. Despite being nominated to 4 elimination challenges, Franks won each elimination and eventually made it to the individual portion of the competition, where he was given a Green shirt. Franks was eliminated in Week 11, when he went up against the eventual Top Shot Season 2 Winner, Chris Reed, in the "Down to the Wire" episode, in the elimination challenge that required shooting flying clay targets while standing in the back of a moving HMMWV (“Humvee”).

Franks was brought back in 2013 to compete in Top Shot Season 5 titled Top Shot All Stars. Jamie famously hit the longest shot ever attempted on Top Shot; ONE MILE. He did so in one shot, in 30 seconds, and was the very first contestant to attempt the shot. He was eliminated in Week 7, when he shot against Gary Quesenberry in the "Thread the Needle" Challenge.

== Competitive shooting career ==
Since competition on Top Shot, Franks has continued his competitive shooting career in multi-gun. He has competed in the 3-Gun National Semi Pro Series where he won one match, and finished in the Top Five eight times and finished among the Top 10 eleven times.
