= Jack Dagger =

American knife throwing and primitive weapons expert

- Born: Todd Abrams; December 27; Baton Rouge, Louisiana
- Known for: Knife throwing

Jack Dagger is an American knife throwing and primitive weapons expert. He grew up in Baton Rouge, Louisiana, where he started practicing knife and axe throwing from a young age.

As he became an expert, Dagger organized the Baton Rouge Knife and Axe Throwers Club. His first television commercial was in 1995, which featured him throwing a tomahawk at a Louisiana-shaped target for a local political campaign ad.

Dagger moved to Los Angeles in 2003, where he met Michael J. Bainton, current executive director of the International Knife Throwing Hall of Fame. Bainton guided Dagger to practice further, perfecting his technique. Since then, Dagger has performed in over a thousand shows, as well as made several television appearances. He also organized the LA Daggers.

Dagger has won several World Championships, and has been recognized by the International Knife Throwers Hall of Fame. Some of the tricks he has performed or designed are the Knife Catch, the Tomahawk Catch, the Unicorn Catch, and the Jack Knife – Cucumber Slice, which he performed in 2009 on The Tonight Show with Conan O'Brien. He has also received the National Knife Throwing Entertainer of the Year Award three times. Dagger also works as an adviser and tutor to artists. He has worked with David Boreanaz (from Angel) and Adam Sandler (from You Don't Mess with the Zohan).

Dagger has been a recurring trainer in History Channel's marksmen competition show, Top Shot. Dagger has trained the contestants in the use of throwing knives, slingshots, tomahawks, blowguns, and atlatls.
