= Craig Sawyer =

TV personality (born 1963)

- Sawyer in 2016
- Born: 5 October 1963 (age 62)
- Occupations: Founder, Veterans For Child Rescue
- Known for: Former Navy SEAL, Dignitary Technical Advisor

Craig Randall "Sawman" Sawyer (born October 5, 1963) is a Marine veteran, former Navy SEAL, sniper, combat instructor. Sawyer is the owner of Tactical Insider, which brings technical advice on weapons and combat to Hollywood films and actors.

Sawyer began his military career with the U.S. Marine Corps in 1983, and switched to the U.S. Navy in July 1986 to pursue a career in special operations as a Navy SEAL. Sawyer attended Basic Underwater Demolition/SEAL training and graduated with BUD/S class 149 in 1988. He then attended Basic Airborne School at Fort Benning, Georgia and received assignment to SEAL Team One. Following advanced SEAL Tactical Training (STT) and completion of six month probationary period, he received the Navy Enlisted Classification (NEC) 5326 as a Combatant Swimmer (SEAL), entitled to wear the Special Warfare insignia also known as SEAL Trident. Sawyer deployed during Gulf War and subsequently served as sniper instructor. He went on to serve with the Naval Special Warfare Development Group, commonly known as SEAL Team Six, until leaving the Navy in 1999. Throughout his career, Sawyer has become an expert in several military and combat disciplines like shooting; counter-terrorism; surveillance and counter-surveillance; climbing; criminal investigation; parachuting; and hand-to-hand combat, among others.

On High-Threat Mobile Security operations for the U.S. Department of State in Iraq in 2004–2005, Sawyer served as an Agent In Charge (AIC) responsible for the DOS Chief of Mission leaders in his assigned region. In addition to running the security details for those Regional Coordinators, Sawyer was also responsible for securing other U.S. dignitaries and DOS personnel during their visits to that high-threat war zone region.

Sawyer founded Tactical Insider to provide training and technical advice to films, actors, and political clients. He has contributed to news shows like FOX News and CBS Evening News with Katie Couric. He has also been a frequent contributor to History Channel's show Sniper: Deadliest Missions. Since 2010, Sawyer has been a recurring trainer for History's marksmen competition Top Shot, appearing in all five seasons. In 2013, Craig led a team of fellow spec ops veterans on a series of tactical missions against rhino poachers in Africa. These missions were filmed and aired on Animal Planet's series, Battleground: Rhino Wars.

Sawyer is also a motocross racer and local Las Vegas champion. He was also selected by Maxim as "Maximum Warrior".

== Vets For Child Rescue ==
In April 2017, Sawyer founded Veterans For Child Rescue (V4CR), a nonprofit organization to help raise awareness of child sex trafficking and fight child exploitation in the United States. Through his efforts with V4CR, Sawyer began production on a documentary feature-length film. This film was released on May 8, 2020. Sawyer promoted his efforts to combat child sex trafficking, publicly claiming in a documentary funded by former Overstock CEO Patrick Byrne that ballot fraud was being run on the same networks as the child sex trafficking, which gained widespread attention from QAnon followers.

== QAnon Involvement ==
Sawyer has at times both criticized and praised the QAnon conspiracy theory, and has shared "a wealth of Q-adjacent material, including a conspiracy meme about figures like Bill Gates and George Soros pursuing a number of fantastical aims like population control and 'one world government.'" Sawyer made an appearance in the QAnon adjacent Deep Rig documentary that promoted the Arizona audit, alleging the election fraud was being run by the same organisations as the child sex trafficking conspiracies he claims his V4CR group is combating.

Sawyer was reportedly involved in promoting and later disavowing QAnon related conspiracies regarding an alleged child sex trafficking camp in Southern Arizona. In 2024, Sawyer was part of an attempted child sex trafficking sting that resulted in an investigation by the Tennessee Bureau of Investigations.
