= Top Shot =

- Also known as: Top Shot Reloaded
- Genre: Reality TV
- Directed by: Adam Vetri
- Presented by: Colby Donaldson
- Starring: see contestants below
- Composer: Vanacore Music
- Country of origin: United States
- Original language: English
- No. of seasons: 5
- No. of episodes: 48

Production
- Executive producers: Craig Piligian; Ralph Wikke
- Producers: Ben Beatie; Clark Bernstein; Megan Gibson; Michael Matsumoto; Eric Mazer
- Production location: Santa Clarita, California
- Cinematography: Matthew Novello
- Editors: John Wolfenden; Andrew Pierce
- Camera setup: multiple-camera setup
- Production company: Pilgrim Films & Television

Original release
- Network: History Channel
- Release: June 6, 2010 – August 28, 2013

Top Shot is an American reality television show that debuted on the History Channel on June 6, 2010. In the show, 16 contestants, split into two teams of eight, compete in various types of shooting challenges. One by one, the contestants are eliminated until only one remains. That contestant receives a $100,000 grand prize and the title of "Top Shot." Survivor: The Australian Outback runner-up Colby Donaldson is the host.

== Gameplay ==
=== Seasons 1–4 ===
Top Shot is based on a progressive elimination to narrow down the starting field of sixteen to eighteen contestants to a final winner. The game challenges the players with their skill and ability with a range of weapons, most often firearms including handguns, pistols, and rifles, but can include grenade launchers, bows or crossbows, and thrown weapons such as knives and hatchets. When not in competition or practice, the combined group are secluded in a well-furnished house with food and recreational activities.

The initial half of the game splits the contestants into two teams, Red and Blue, and given shirts and jackets of that color to identify them. Each round during the team challenges feature two shooting contests. The first is a team challenge where the two teams vie against each other in a competition. The teams are first introduced to the firearm they will be using and are given separate practice periods and the help of a professional shooter to learn and adjust to the weapon as well as any special conditions they may have to encounter. This allows the team to assess the other members which often is necessary for strategy. The subsequent challenge will involve the same weapon and similar shooting skill, but often with an added twist, such as shooting at now-moving targets. At the challenge, the teams may compete directly to reach a certain condition first, or perform separately to try to obtain the best time or score; in this latter case, the other team is sent away as to be unaware of the other team's score or time before their turn. Teams are generally balanced before a challenge, with larger teams sitting out shooters selected by themselves or the opposing team based on the rules of the season.

The losing team of the challenge has to vote two members from their team to go to the elimination challenge. The vote takes place at a special shooting range with wooden targets, each with the name of a remaining team member. Each player votes by firing a round into the target of their choice, though they cannot vote for themselves. The two players receiving the most votes enter the elimination challenge. If there is a tie, a random cartridge with a player's name is drawn from an ammo box (excluding those that are tied), and that player's next shot determines who goes to the elimination challenge.

Similar to the team challenge, the elimination challenge first introduces the two players to the weapon they will be using, after which they are separated and both given the opportunity to train on the firearm with an expert. They then go home and pack their belongings as the loser will be sent home immediately after the elimination challenge ends. They meet later to compete against each other in front of the rest of their team. As with team challenges, the elimination challenge may be a simultaneous competition or separate rounds, with the other player sent away while one player competes. The winner of the challenge reunites with his team and, from Season 2 onward, receives a Bass Pro Shops gift card worth $2,000. The loser is eliminated from the game, and after giving a moment to say goodbye to the rest of the team, leaves the contest immediately.

When eight players are left in the game, the two teams are merged into a single Green team, and from here out all challenges are for elimination, with the worst performing player or players sent home. The penultimate challenge with three players remaining has been a "call your shot" challenge, where each player can set up a shot with a specific weapon, target type, and distance, anticipating that they can make that shot but their opponents cannot. The final challenge is a multi-station course, typically reusing weapons from previous challenges; the player that completes all the stations first is declared the Top Shot and winner of the season.

=== Season 5 (All Stars) ===
For the All Stars season, the players are not assigned to teams, but compete on an individual basis throughout the season. In addition, the process of nominating players for elimination is not used; instead, the lowest-performing players from the individual challenge take part in a "Proving Ground" challenge. The two lowest performers from this step compete in an elimination challenge, with the loser being dismissed from the competition.

== Seasons ==
=== Season 1 (2010) ===
First aired June 6 – August 15, 2010

Season 1 of Top Shot was filmed over a period of 33 days in the spring of 2010 in Santa Clarita, California.

In episodes 7 and 8, the larger team (Blue) decided for itself who would participate or be benched. The teams were dissolved in episode 9, with all players competing directly against each other from this point on and one or more players being eliminated after every challenge.

Every time a player was eliminated, the remaining group hung one of that player's shirts, marked with his/her name, from the railing of the staircase in the house where they were living.

Iain Harrison was the winner of season one.

=== Season 2 (2011) ===
First aired February 8 – April 26, 2011

In this season (referred to in promotional spots as Top Shot Reloaded), a preliminary head-to-head challenge was played in Episode 1, with the two winners being allowed to choose the teams. Beginning with this season, the winner of every elimination challenge received a $2,000 gift card to Bass Pro Shops, and each elimination was marked with a target-shaped plaque (showing the player's name and team color) being nailed to a wall inside the house.

Similar to Season 1, the teams were dissolved in episode 9, and all challenges were head-to-head. The remaining players were given green shirts to wear for the rest of the competition. Unlike Season 1, the winner of the individual challenge in episodes 9–11 won immunity from elimination for the day; the others participated in an elimination round as before. Only the three challenges in episode 12 resulted in immediate elimination of the loser.

Chris Reed was the winner of season two.

=== Season 3 (2011) ===
First aired August 9 – October 25, 2011

Season 3 of Top Shot premiered on August 9, 2011. In Episode 1, a preliminary challenge was played between pairs of contestants, with the winner and loser of each pair joining the Blue and Red Teams, respectively.

Dustin Ellermann was the winner of season three.

=== Season 4 (2012) ===
First aired February 14 – May 1, 2012

The new season premiered on February 14, 2012, at 10pm EST. In addition to receiving the $100,000 cash prize as in past seasons, the winner was given the opportunity to become a professional shooter sponsored by Bass Pro Shops.

The season began with 18 contestants rather than 16. A preliminary challenge was played in Episode 1; the two worst performers were eliminated immediately, while the others were assigned to teams based on their results.

Chris Cheng was the winner of season four. Cheng was the first openly gay winner of contest. Cheng said of the experience that the gun rights community has been very supportive stating, "...When I auditioned, I was openly gay. But I was surprised as nobody cared. They only cared how well I could shoot and represent our season..."

=== Season 5 (2013) ===
First aired May 29 – August 28, 2013

Season 5 (titled Top Shot All Stars) premiered on May 29, 2013, and featured non-winning contestants from the previous four seasons. In addition to the $100,000 cash prize, the winner received a Top Shot special edition Tahoe Q5i speedboat provided by Bass Pro Shops.

Phil Morden was the winner of season five.

== Reception ==
The show drew 2.1 million total viewers in its debut episode. The viewers were categorized as adults 25–54 (1.3 million) and adults 18–49 (1.1 million). In August 2010, History Channel released an ad inviting people to audition for the second season of the show. Advertising began in late December for Top Shot Reloaded as the name for the second season.

Episode 1 of Season 2 premiered on February 8, 2011. The second-season premiere drew 2.8 million total viewers, categorized as adults 18–49 (1.4 million) and adults 25–54 (1.4 million). It was the series' most-watched episode ever and compared to the previous series debut last June, it grew 33% in total viewers.

Season 4 premiered on February 14, 2012, capturing 1.8 million total viewers. This represented a growth of 19% over the Season 3 premiere. On April 10, 2012, Colby Donaldson revealed on his Twitter page that Top Shot had not been renewed yet and asked for support to get History to renew the show for a fifth season. He later tweeted on April 11, 2012, that the show had not been cancelled, although solid episode ratings for the remainder of the current season would be needed for The History Channel to renew for another season. He tweeted for his followers to get involved and let The History Channel know how much they enjoy the show. On May 19, 2012, he announced that Top Shot would be renewed for a fifth season and implied that it would be an All-Stars season.

== Top Guns ==
In 2012, the TV series Top Guns aired on the H2 network. Top Guns was a spinoff series, also hosted by Colby Donaldson, and focusing on the same weapons that were used in season 4 of Top Shot. As a spin-off of Top Shot, Top Guns focused on the weapons used and mastered by various marksmen and sharpshooters. Throughout the show, historical information about each weapon was presented.

Each week, Colby was joined by an expert and a marksman to review three iconic weapons and put them through their paces. After the introduction, each weapon was given a going over by the expert and the marksman and assigned a grade. After each weapon was graded, Colby took his turn with each and each shooter chose one weapon to use in the competition.

== See also ==
- Hot Shots, an American shooting sport television show debuted on the NBC Sports Network
