= F3F =

F3F may refer to:

- Grumman F3F, an aircraft
- Fun Fun Fun Fest, an annual music festival held in Austin, Texas
- F3F, a class of competition for radio-controlled model gliders, administered by the Fédération Aéronautique International. The competition involves flying 10 consecutive laps of a 100m course as fast as possible. The course is laid out on the side of a hill with the wind blowing onto it. Hence the informal name of F3F: 'slope racing'.
