= ZISD =

ZISD may refer to:

- Zavalla Independent School District
- Zephyr Independent School District
