= VF-72 =

Fighting Squadron 72
- Active: 1 July 1939 – 29 March 1943
- Country: United States
- Branch: United States Navy
- Part of: Inactive
- Aircraft: F3F-3; F4F Wildcat
- Engagements: World War II

Fighting Squadron 72 or VF-72 was an aviation unit of the U.S. Navy, originally established as VF-7 on 1 July 1939, it was redesignated as VF-72 on 19 November 1940 and disestablished on 29 March 1943.

== Operational history ==
VF-7 was originally equipped with Grumman F2F and Grumman F3F aircraft. It was reequipped with the F4F-3 Wildcat in December 1940 and deployed as part of Carrier Air Group 7 (CVG-7) aboard the USS Wasp.

From January to March 1942 VF-72 was deployed on USS Ranger in the Atlantic Fleet. In April 1942, VF-72 was based ashore at Naval Station Norfolk and then transferred to the USS Wasp. In early June 1942, VF-72 had reequipped with the F4F-4 at NAS Alameda and from mid-June through July was shore-based at Naval Station Pearl Harbor. In August VF-72 was deployed on USS Hornet.

Artist Thomas C. Lea III depicted VF-72's executive officer, Lt A. C. "Silver" Emerson in action during the Solomon Islands campaign in his painting "Defending the Ship."

Following the sinking of the USS Hornet on 26 October 1942, VF-72 was deployed on USS Nassau from January until March 1943 when it was disembarked at Pearl Harbor.

== Home port assignments ==
- NAS Norfolk
- NAS Alameda
- Naval Station Pearl Harbor

== Aircraft assignment ==
- Grumman F2F-1
- Grumman F3F-1
- Grumman F4F-3 Wildcat

== See also ==
- List of inactive United States Navy aircraft squadrons
- History of the United States Navy
