= VF-3 =

Fighting Squadron 3
- Active: 1 July 1922-May 1924
- Country: United States
- Branch: United States Navy
- Type: Fighter

Fighting Squadron 3 or VF-3, was an aviation unit of the United States Navy. Originally established on 1 July 1922, it was disestablished in May 1924.

VF-6 squadron was redesignated as VF-3 from 1 July 1937 until 14 July 1943.

VF-31 squadron was redesignated as VF-3 from 15 July 1943 until 15 November 1946.

== See also ==
- History of the United States Navy
- List of inactive United States Navy aircraft squadrons
- List of United States Navy aircraft squadrons
