= VB-2B =

VB-2B may refer to:

- VF-6, a United States Navy aviation squadron designated VB-2B from 1 July 1928 to 1 July 1930
- VFA-14, a United States Navy aviation squadron designated VB-2B from 1 July 1934 to 1 July 1937
