= Arthur Ray Hawkins =

American flying ace (1922–2004)

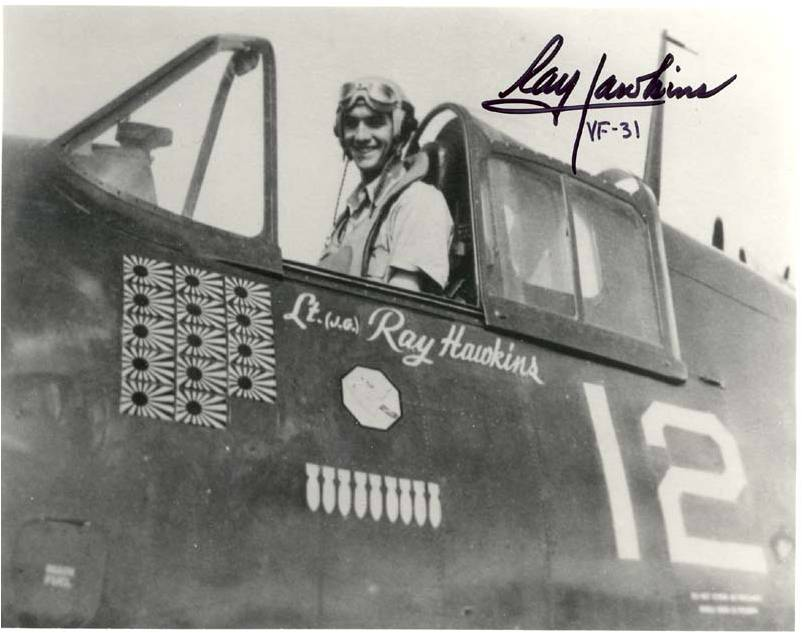
- LT (jg) Ray Hawkins in his F-6F Hellcat
- Born: December 12, 1922; Zavalla, Texas
- Died: March 21, 2004 (aged 81); Pensacola, Florida
- Burial place: Barrancas National Cemetery
- Military career
- Allegiance: United States
- Branch: United States Navy
- Service years: 1942–1973
- Rank: Captain
- Nickname: "Hawk"
- Units: Fighter Squadron 31 (VF-31); Fighter Squadron 191 (VF-191)
- Commands: Naval Air Station Atsugi
- Conflicts: World War II; Korean War
- Awards: Navy Cross (3); Legion of Merit (2); Distinguished Flying Cross (3); Air Medal (3); Purple Heart; Order of the Sacred Treasure, 3rd Class (Japan)
- Other work: National Museum of Naval Aviation

Arthur Ray "Hawk" Hawkins (12 December 1922 – 21 March 2004) was an American naval aviator and flying ace of World War II. He was the United States Navy's tenth leading ace with 14 aerial victories to his credit.

== Early life ==
Hawkins was born in Zavalla, Texas, on 12 December 1922. At the age of 19 in 1942, he joined the United States Navy after the death of his brother, a United States Army Air Force fighter pilot, who was shot down in the South Pacific.

== Naval career ==
=== 1940s ===
Hawkins was designated a Naval Aviator and commissioned an ensign on 1 January 1943. He was then attached to Fighter Squadron 31 (VF-31) aboard the aircraft carrier USS Cabot (CVL-28) from January to October 1944.

While flying from Cabot in 1944, Hawkins was credited with 14 confirmed and three probable kills, all while flying F6F Hellcats. His first victory was near Truk on 29 April 1944 when, seconds after launch from Cabot, he shot down an attacking Japanese torpedo bomber. He subsequently shot down three enemy aircraft on 19 June during the Battle of the Philippine Sea's "Marianas Turkey Shoot", one on 8 July during the Battle of Guam, five on 13 September near Mindanao in the Philippine Islands, and four on 21 September during the Battle of Luzon in the Philippines.

Hawkins volunteered for a second tour of duty aboard USS Belleau Wood (CVL-24) from June 1945 through October 1945, when VF-31 was dissolved. Hawkins' war record included destroying 39 aircraft on the ground and assisting in the sinking of a battleship. He was awarded the Navy Cross three times, the Distinguished Flying Cross three times, and three Air Medals.

After World War II, Lieutenant Hawkins flew with the U.S. Navy Blue Angels flight demonstration team from 1948 to 1950, flying the Grumman F8F Bearcat piston-engine fighter and later the Grumman F9F-2 Panther jet fighter.

=== 1950s ===
When the Korean War broke out in 1950, the Blue Angels were dissolved, with the majority of the pilots forming Fighter Squadron 191 (VF-191), nicknamed "Satan's Kittens". Hawkins served as the squadron's executive officer, flying 40 combat missions from the deck of USS Princeton (CV-37), and participating in the first carrier-based jet bombing mission of the war.

After the Korean War, the Blue Angels were re-formed, and Lieutenant Commander Hawkins was recalled to serve as their flight leader from 1952 through 1953. During this time, he was the first pilot to survive an ejection from a supersonic aircraft. He was inverted (upside down) and somewhere between 25,000 feet (7,600 meters) and 32,000 feet (9,800 meters) in altitude at the time he ejected. Since he could not reach the pre-ejection lever due to his inverted position, his canopy did not separate and he ejected through the canopy, possibly becoming the first pilot to do that as well.

=== 1960s–1970s ===
In the 1960s, Hawkins commanded Naval Air Station Atsugi in Japan, where he worked to recover Japanese family artifacts lost during World War II. For this work, he was awarded the Order of the Sacred Treasure, Third Class by the Japanese government.

== Later life and family ==
Hawkins retired from the U.S. Navy as a captain in 1973 and subsequently worked with the National Museum of Naval Aviation in Pensacola, Florida, retiring in 1997 as its chief-of-staff.

Hawkins' daughter, Jill Hawkins Votaw, followed in his footsteps and was commissioned as an ensign in the U.S. Navy, graduating in 1980 from the United States Naval Academy as a member of the first class to graduate from the academy that included women. She retired from the Naval Reserve as a captain in 2010.

In 1984, Hawkins was inducted into the National Aviation Hall of Fame and in 2001 into the Texas Aviation Hall of Fame. In 2006, Captain Hawkins was inducted into the Naval Aviation Hall of Honor.

Hawkins died on March 21, 2004 in Pensacola, Florida. He is buried at Barrancas National Cemetery.

== Awards and decorations ==
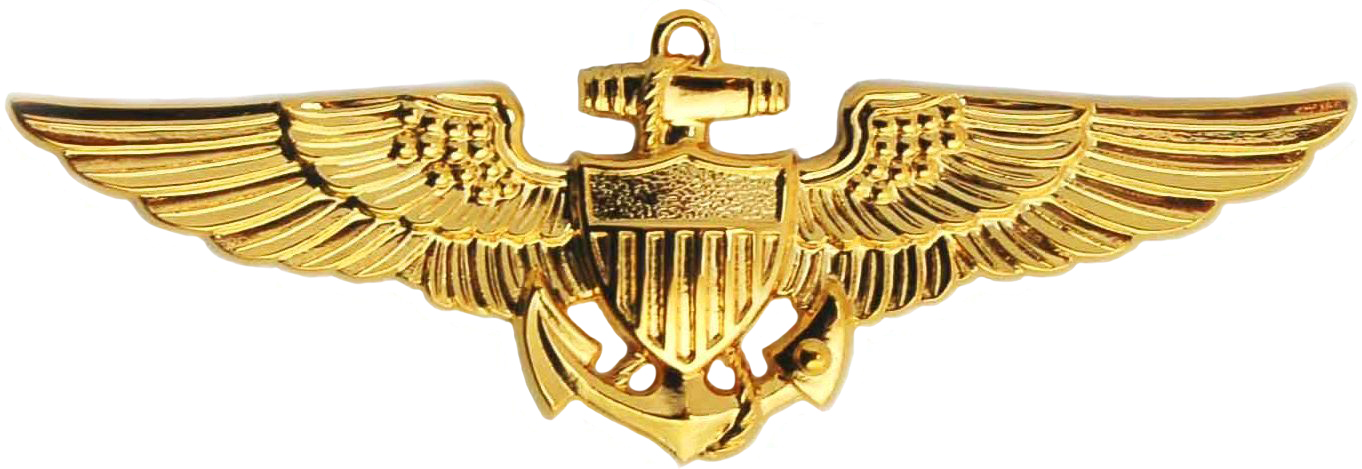

Naval Aviator Badge
Navy Cross w/ two 5/16" Gold Stars
Legion of Merit w/ 5/16" Gold Star	Distinguished Flying Cross w/ two 5/16" Gold Stars	Air Medal w/ three 5/16" Gold Stars	Combat Action Ribbon w/ 5/16" Gold Star	Navy Commendation Medal
Navy Presidential Unit Citation w/ two 3/16" Bronze Stars	American Campaign Medal	Asiatic-Pacific Campaign Medal w/ one 3/16" Silver Star and two 3/16" Bronze Stars		
World War II Victory Medal	Navy Occupation Service Medal w/ 'Japan' clasp	China Service Medal		
National Defense Service Medal w/ one 3/16" Bronze Star	Korean Service Medal w/ three 3/16" Bronze Stars	Third class of the Order of the Sacred Treasure (Japan)		
Philippine Liberation Medal w/ one 3/16" Bronze Star	Republic of Korea Presidential Unit Citation	Philippine Presidential Unit Citation		
United Nations Korea Medal	Republic of Korea War Service Medal	Navy Pistol Marksmanship Ribbon		

=== 1st Navy Cross citation ===

Lieutenant Arthur Ray Hawkins
U.S. Navy
Date Of Action: September 13, 1944

The President of the United States of America takes pleasure in presenting the Navy Cross to Lieutenant [then Lieutenant, Junior Grade] Arthur Ray Hawkins, United States Naval Reserve, for extraordinary heroism in operations against the enemy while serving as Pilot of a carrier-based Navy Fighter Plane in Fighting Squadron THIRTY-ONE (VF-31), attached to the USS Cabot (CVL-28), in action against enemy forces in the vicinity of the Philippine Islands, on 13 September 1944. Participating in a pre-dawn take-off to strike against a vastly superior number of hostile aircraft, Lieutenant Hawkins braved heavy anti-aircraft fire from ground installations and, relentlessly pressed home his attacks at perilously low altitudes through intense enemy anti-aircraft fire to shoot down five Japanese air fighters in flames and damaged an additional three airborne enemy planes. By his superb airmanship, aggressive fighting spirit, and unwavering devotion to duty Lieutenant Hawkins contributed substantially to the success of this vital operation, thereby reflecting the highest credit upon himself and the United States Naval Service.

=== 2nd Navy Cross citation ===

Lieutenant Arthur Ray Hawkins
U.S. Navy
Date Of Action: September 21, 1944

The President of the United States of America takes pleasure in presenting a Gold Star in lieu of a Second Award of the Navy Cross to Lieutenant [then Lieutenant, Junior Grade] Arthur Ray Hawkins, United States Naval Reserve, for extraordinary heroism in operations against the enemy while serving as Pilot of a carrier-based Navy Fighter Plane in Fighting Squadron THIRTY-ONE (VF-31), attached to the USS Cabot (CVL-28), in action against enemy Japanese forces in the vicinity of the Philippine Islands, on 21 September 1944. Daring in combat, Lieutenant Hawkins participated in the first fighter sweep against an important enemy-held airfield and by his bold tactics and fighting spirit, he succeeded in shooting down four enemy planes and in damaging a fifth. Relentlessly and determined, he pressed home a perilously low-altitude strafing run through intense anti-aircraft fire to inflict severe damage on an enemy plane parked beside the runway. His great personal valor, resourceful initiative and devotion to duty were in keeping with the highest traditions of the United States Naval Service.

=== 3rd Navy Cross citation ===

Lieutenant Arthur Ray Hawkins
U.S. Navy
Date Of Action: July 24, 1945

The President of the United States of America takes pleasure in presenting a Second Gold Star in lieu of a Third Award of the Navy Cross to Lieutenant [then Lieutenant, Junior Grade] Arthur Ray Hawkins, United States Naval Reserve, for extraordinary heroism in operations against the enemy while serving as Pilot of a carrier-based Navy Fighter Plane and Division Leader in Fighting Squadron THIRTY-ONE (VF-31), attached to the USS Cabot (CVL-28), in action against major units of the Japanese Fleet at Kure Harbor, Japan, on 24 July 1945. Fearlessly braving intense anti-aircraft fire, Lieutenant Hawkins pressed home a vigorous attack against the enemy battleship Ise to score a direct hit and contribute materially to the final destruction of the hostile vessel. His expert airmanship and courageous devotion to duty were in keeping with the highest traditions of the United States Naval Service.
