= Top Shot season 3 =

Top Shot
- Season 3
- Region 1 DVD cover
- No. of episodes: 12

Release
- Original network: History
- Original release: August 9 – October 25, 2011

Season chronology
- ← Previous; Season 2 Next → Season 4

The third season of the History Channel television series Top Shot, commenced airing on August 9, 2011. The season contained twelve episodes, and was filmed over a period of 35 days in Santa Clarita, California.

The season was won by Dustin Ellermann. Gary Quesenberry, Alex Charvat, and Phil Morden returned for Top Shot: All-Stars. Charvat finished in 11th and Quesenberry finished in 3rd, while Morden was the season's winner.

== Contestants ==
Contestant	Occupation / background	Original Team	Merged Team	Eliminated
Amanda Hardin; 33, Birmingham, AL	Firearms Instructor, Nurse, Realty Broker	Red Team		16th Place
Sara Ahrens; 38, Beloit, WI	Police Training Sergeant, former SWAT team member	Blue Team		15th Place
Drew Shprintz; 27, Philadelphia, PA	Firearms Instructor, Bartender, Outdoorsman	Red Team		14th Place
Mark Schneider; 45, Largo, FL	USPSA Competitor, Customer Service Professional, Air Force veteran, Outdoorsman	Red Team		13th Place
Jarrett Grimes; 42, Tyrone, GA	Department of Homeland Security Agent, USAF Veteran, Former Police Officer/SWAT Team Member, Competition Shooter	Blue Team		12th Place
Paul Marinaccio; 31, Fairfield, NJ	Detective, Firearms Instructor	Blue Team		11th Place
Billy Rogers; 33, Virginia Beach, VA	Restaurant Operator, Competition Shooter	Blue Team		10th Place
Michael Marelli; 28, Long Island, NY	NY State Court Officer, Competition Shotgun Shooter	Red Team		9th Place
Cliff Walsh; 41, Tierra Verde, FL	Airport Driver, Competitive revolver shooter, Revolver World Champion, USPSA National Revolver Champion, Former Sheriff's Deputy	Red Team		8th Place
Mike Hughes; Returned to game	Firearms Training Equipment Company President, Competitive Pistol Shooter	Blue Team	Green Team	Returned
Jake Zweig; 39, Steilacoom, WA	College Football Coach, Former Navy SEAL	Blue Team	Green Team	7th Place
Phil Morden; 25, Milford, MI	Video Producer, Three Gun Competitor, Gunsmith	Red Team	Green Team	6th Place*
Alex Charvat; 38, Green Bay, WI	Structural Engineering business owner, former Forester, Outdoorsman	Blue Team	Green Team	5th Place
Chris Collins; 25, Collinsville, OK	United States Shooting Academy Firearms Instructor, Sales and Marketing coordinator, Former Marine Fleet Anti-Terrorist Security Team member and infantryman	Red Team	Green Team	4th Place
Gary Quesenberry; 41, Cleveland, OH	Department of Homeland Security Agent, U.S. Army Veteran, Competition Shooter	Red Team	Green Team	3rd Place
Mike Hughes; 38, Maple Falls, WA	Firearms Training Equipment Company President, Competitive Pistol Shooter	Blue Team	Green Team	2nd Place
Dustin Ellermann; 28, Zavalla, TX	Christian Camp Director, Accountant, Outdoorsman, Lumberjack, Minister	Blue Team	Green Team	Winner

*Mike Hughes was originally eliminated in 7th place. After Jake Zweig refused to compete in the elimination challenge when nominated, Mike took his place and defeated Phil Morden in the challenge to re-enter the competition.

== Contestant progress ==
#	Contestant	Episodes													
#	Contestant	1	2	3	4	5	6	7	8	9	10	11	12		
1	Dustin	WIN	NOM	WIN	WIN	SAFE	SAFE	WIN	WIN	WIN	WIN	SAFE	BTM2	WIN	TOP SHOT
2	Mike	WIN	SAFE	WIN	WIN	NOM	SAFE	WIN	WIN	OUT	IN	NOM	WIN	WIN	SECOND PLACE
3	Gary	SAFE	WIN	SAFE	SAFE	WIN	WIN	SAFE	SAFE	NOM	SAFE	SAFE	WIN	OUT	
4	Chris	SAFE	WIN	SAFE	SAFE	WIN	WIN	SAFE	NOM	SAFE	SAFE	WIN	OUT		
5	Alex	WIN	SAFE	WIN	WIN	SAFE	SAFE	WIN	WIN	SAFE	SAFE	OUT			
6	Phil	SAFE	WIN	SAFE	SAFE	WIN	WIN	SAFE	SAFE	SAFE	OUT				
7	Jake	WIN	SAFE	WIN	WIN	SAFE	NOM	WIN	WIN	SAFE	QUIT				
8	Cliff	SAFE	WIN	NOM	SAFE	WIN	WIN	NOM	OUT						
9	Michael	SAFE	WIN	SAFE	NOM	WIN	WIN	OUT							
10	Billy	WIN	SAFE	WIN	WIN	SAFE	SAFE	QUIT							
11	Paul	WIN	SAFE	WIN	WIN	SAFE	OUT								
12	Jarrett	WIN	SAFE	WIN	WIN	OUT									
13	Mark	NOM	WIN	SAFE	OUT										
14	Drew	SAFE	WIN	OUT											
15	Sara	WIN	OUT												
16	Amanda	OUT													

The player's team won the team challenge (Episodes 1 - 8).
The player(s) won an individual challenge (Episodes 9 - 12), earning immunity from elimination for the current round.
The player's team lost the team challenge, but the player was not nominated for elimination (Episodes 1 - 8); the player(s) lost the individual challenge, but was not nominated for elimination (Episodes 9 - 11).
The player was nominated for elimination, but won an elimination challenge (Episode 9 - 11); or the player finished in the bottom two but won a tiebreaker (Episode 12).
The player lost an elimination challenge and was eliminated.
The player voluntarily withdrew from the competition.
The player won an elimination challenge to re-enter the competition.
The player won the $100,000 grand prize and the title of Top Shot.
The player came in second.

== Episodes ==
=== Episode 1: "The Gauntlet" ===
Premiere date	Preliminary challenge weapon(s)	Preliminary challenge	Red Team Members	Blue Team Members
August 9, 2011	Smith & Wesson Model 500 revolver	Two players at a time fire at separate sets of targets from 30/50/70 feet. The first to hit all three joins the Blue Team; the other player joins the Red Team.	Amanda, Chris, Cliff, Drew, Gary, Mark, Michael, Phil	Alex, Billy, Dustin, Jake, Jarrett, Mike, Paul, Sara
August 9, 2011	Team challenge weapon(s)	Team challenge	Benched player(s)	Winning team
August 9, 2011	LaRue Tactical Optimized Battle Rifle (based on the AR-10/AR-15 rifles)	"Up The Pole Challenge": Each team carries a 16-foot, 220-pound pole to four shooting stations. At each station, two shooters climb the pole up to an elevated platform and shoot at two targets from 75/100 yards, with each shooter in the pair firing at one target and spotting the other, then climb back down. First team to complete all four stations wins.	N/A	Blue Team
August 9, 2011	Elimination challenge weapon(s)	Elimination challenge	Nominated for elimination	Eliminated player
August 9, 2011	Winchester Model 1873 rifle	"Stagecoach Shootout Challenge": While riding shotgun on a stagecoach traveling at 25 miles per hour, fire at 10 targets that pop up along the road, 15-25 yards away. Maximum 10 rounds per player.	Amanda, Mark	Amanda

No practice sessions were held for the preliminary and team challenges. The trainer for the elimination challenge was Jim "Long Hunter" Finch, cowboy shooting specialist.

^1 Repeating rifles were a significant advance over single-shot rifles for use in combat due to their greater rate of fire.

=== Episode 2: "Down and Dirty" ===
Premiere date	Team challenge weapon(s)	Team challenge	Benched player(s)	Winning team
August 16, 2011	AK-47 rifle	"Down and Dirty Challenge": Run an obstacle course with 4 prone shooting stations while carrying the rifle; two targets at 50/75 yards are set up at each. Each team splits into three pairs and a solo shooter, who runs last. Obstacles are a 20-foot pipe crawl, a waist-deep water pit, and 25-foot crawls through mud and sand. Once one pair completes a station, the next shooter(s) must run the entire course up to that point and pick up the rifle(s) to move on. First team to complete all stations wins.	Jarrett	Red Team
August 16, 2011	Elimination challenge weapon(s)	Elimination challenge	Nominated for elimination	Eliminated player
August 16, 2011	Smith & Wesson M&P semiautomatic pistol (.45 ACP)	"Light It Up Challenge": Shoot at 6 rows of 8 glass bulbs each that rotate into view from behind a wall 30 feet away, a new row every 10 seconds. Shooters have 60 seconds to hit as many red "foe" bulbs as possible while avoiding the blue "friend" bulbs.	Sara, Dustin	Sara

The trainer for both challenges was Craig Sawyer, Navy SEALs instructor and former sniper.

^2 Smith & Wesson's "M&P" stands for "military and police". Its design is based on input from law enforcement and the military.

=== Episode 3: "Slug It Out" ===
Premiere date	Team challenge weapon(s)	Team challenge	Benched player(s)	Winning team
August 23, 2011	Benelli M4 Super 90 shotgun, loaded with 1-oz slugs	"Slug It Out Challenge": Teams fire at separate sets of 50 jars from 40 yards, one shooter at a time per team. Each shooter loads and fires 5 rounds per turn, carrying 4 in a belt caddy and the last in hand. First team to hit all targets wins.	N/A	Blue Team
August 23, 2011	Elimination challenge weapon(s)	Elimination challenge	Nominated for elimination	Eliminated player
August 23, 2011	Glock 34 9×19mm pistol	"Cannonball Run Challenge": From 35 feet, shoot targets next to 5 gaps in a set of descending tracks in order to close them and allow cannonballs to roll by. A gap will reopen once a ball has passed it; any ball that falls through a gap is out of play. Higher number of balls reaching the end of the run wins.	Drew, Cliff	Drew

The trainer for both challenges was Taran Butler, national/world pistol champion.

=== Episode 4: "The Bulldog Gatling" ===
Premiere date	Team challenge weapon(s)	Team challenge	Benched player(s)	Winning team
August 30, 2011	Remington Model 1875 revolver	"Shooting Dice/Close Out Challenge": From 35 feet, pairs of shooters (one per team) fire at separate sets of targets arranged to resemble the 6 faces of a die. At each station, the revolver is pre-loaded with one round for each target; any additional rounds must be loaded by hand. A station ends as soon as one shooter's targets have all been hit. Higher total number of targets hit wins.	Mike	Blue Team
August 30, 2011	Elimination challenge weapon(s)	Elimination challenge	Nominated for elimination	Eliminated player
August 30, 2011	1877 "Bulldog" Gatling gun	"Bulldog Gatling Challenge": Shoot at separate sets of 4-inch-wide poles from 15/20/25 yards, trying to split them. First shooter to split all three poles wins.	Mark, Michael	Mark

The trainer for the team challenge was Spencer Hoglund, historical weapons expert and four-time national champion speed shooter. The trainer for the elimination challenge was Garry James, historical weapons expert.

^3 The original Gatling gun was invented in 1862 by Richard Gatling, a dentist by profession.
^4 There was a three-way tie between Chris, Michael, and Mark with 2 votes each. It was broken by Gary, who voted for Mark, and Cliff, who voted for Michael.

=== Episode 5: "Throwdown Showdown" ===
Premiere date	Team challenge weapon(s)	Team challenge	Benched player(s)	Winning team
September 6, 2011	Tomahawk; Throwing knife Hand-thrown rock	"Primitive Weapons Challenge": A member of one team challenges an opponent to a faceoff at each of 6 stations. 1) Tomahawk; 3 throws at a pendulum target from 13 feet. 2) Tomahawk; 3 throws at a spinning wood block from 13 feet. 3) Knife; 3 throws at a target behind two swinging beams from 11 feet. 4) Knife; 3 throws at a board of 52 playing cards from 11 feet, trying to get the highest face-value total possible. 5) Rock; both players throw at square grids of 9 glass panes from 15 feet, trying to be the first to break 3 in a row. 6) Rock; both players throw at rows of 5 tin cans from 15 feet. Challenge ends when one player has hit all 5 cans. A coin toss determines which team gets to issue the first challenge; each station's winner decides who will participate in the next one. One point each for stations 1 through 5, and one point per can hit in station 6. Higher point total wins.	Paul, Alex	Red Team
September 6, 2011	Elimination challenge weapon(s)	Elimination challenge	Nominated for elimination	Eliminated player
September 6, 2011	Hotchkiss Mountain Gun	"Bombs Away Challenge": Each shooter fires at 3 water towers from 180-220 yards. First to hit all towers wins; shots must hit the towers' tanks in order to count. Maximum 15 rounds per player.	Jarrett, Mike	Jarrett

The trainer for the team challenge was Jack Dagger, primitive weapons expert. The trainer for the elimination challenge was Rick Pohlers, cannon expert.

^5 Hotchkiss Mountain Gun (France 1877) was used to devastating effect in the battle of San Juan Hill and Wounded Knee Massacre. (Contestants used two of the 1857 originals)

=== Episode 6: "Turn the Corner" ===
Premiere date	Team challenge weapon(s)	Team challenge	Benched player(s)	Winning team
September 13, 2011	Vltor TS3 rifle (based on the M4 carbine)	"Hang in There Challenge": Run a relay race with 5 elevated platforms, shooting targets from 75/100 yards at each.: 1. Climb an 8-foot cargo net to the first platform.; 2. Cross a downward-angled, 16-foot rope to the second.; 3. Use vertically aligned parallel ropes to reach the third.; 4. Cross a 16-foot gap to the fourth on horizontally aligned parallel ropes.; 5. Cross a single rope to the fifth.; Shorter time to complete all stations wins.	Dustin	Red Team
September 13, 2011	Elimination challenge weapon(s)	Elimination challenge	Nominated for elimination	Eliminated player
September 13, 2011	Glock 18 9×19mm pistol fitted into a CornerShot	"CornerShot Challenge": Run a course with 3 shooting stations, standing behind a wall at each and firing at 3 targets from 35 feet around the edge of a small window. The CornerShot must be straightened out before running to each station. Shorter time to hit all targets wins.	Jake, Paul	Paul

The trainer for both challenges was Jeff Gonzales, former Navy SEAL and counter-terrorism instructor. Iain Harrison and Chris Reed, the winners of Seasons 1 and 2, served as honorary team captains (Blue and Red, respectively) during practice for the team challenge and offered their own advice. A $5,000 donation was made to a charity selected by the captain of the winning team (the Make-A-Wish Foundation, Chris' choice; Iain had appeared on behalf of the Wounded Warrior Project).

=== Episode 7: "Tricked Out" ===
Premiere date	Team challenge weapon(s)	Team challenge	Benched player(s)	Winning team
September 20, 2011	Smith & Wesson Model 686 revolver Volquartsen semiautomatic rifle (.22 caliber)	"Trick It Up Challenge": One shooter per team competes at each of 4 stations. Exhibition Shot #1: Holding the revolver upside down, fire at 3 beer bottles from 30 feet. Exhibition Shot #2: Fire the rifle at three 1/8 inch cotton swabs from 25 feet. Exhibition Shot #3: Fire the rifle at 3 compact disks from 35 feet, trying to shoot through the center hole without breaking the plastic. Exhibition Shot #4: While blindfolded, use the revolver to fire 3 pairs of shots at 2 gallon jugs from 25 feet. One point awarded to the team whose shooter hits more targets at each of the first three stations, and one point awarded for each pair of shots that hit the targets at the fourth. Higher point total wins.	Chris	Blue Team
September 20, 2011	Elimination challenge weapon(s)	Elimination challenge	Nominated for elimination	Eliminated player
September 20, 2011	Schofield Revolver (5-inch Barrel Pinkerton Model)	"Shoot from the Hip Challenge": One shooter at a time fires at 10 targets from 25 feet, shooting from the hip so that the bullets pass under a hitching rail. Shooters use two revolvers, each loaded with 5 rounds. Higher number of targets hit wins.	Michael, Cliff	Michael

The trainer for both challenges was Jerry Miculek, holder of four revolver world speed records.

Before the practice sessions for the team challenge, Billy withdrew from the competition due to complications in his wife's pregnancy. Since this decision left the Red Team with one extra member, they were allowed to decide for themselves which player would be benched.

^6 The Schofield Revolver used in this challenge was referred to as the "Pinkerton Model" because the barrel was shortened to 5 inches so Pinkerton detectives could easily conceal it.

=== Episode 8: "Ramp It Up" ===
Premiere date	Team challenge weapon(s)	Team challenge	Benched player(s)	Winning team
September 27, 2011	Modern recurve bow	"Ramp It Up Challenge": Teams fire at separate sets of 6 targets mounted on rotating wheels 50 feet away, trying to bounce arrows off a metal ramp to hit them. One player at a time per team; a player's turn ends after he has either fired 3 arrows or shot a target that has not yet been hit. First team to bounce arrows off the ramp and hit all targets wins.	N/A	Blue Team
September 27, 2011	Elimination challenge weapon(s)	Elimination challenge	Nominated for elimination	Eliminated player
September 27, 2011	Modern recurve bow	"Slider Challenge": From 20 yards, with unlimited arrows, both players fire at 4 two-color targets moving back and forth at different heights. Player with more hits on his assigned color (including accidental hits by his opponent) after 3 minutes and 30 seconds wins.	Cliff, Chris	Cliff

The trainer for both challenges was Chris Palmer, archery expert and world-class archer.

=== Episode 9: "Stacked" ===
The teams were dissolved at the start of this episode. All players received green shirts and began to compete directly against each other for the rest of the season. After the individual challenge, all players voted for one of the lowest performers. The top two vote-getters then competed in an elimination challenge as in earlier episodes.

Premiere date	Individual challenge weapon(s)	Individual challenge		Winning player(s)
October 4, 2011	McMillan Tac-50 rifle	"Go Big or Go Home Challenge": Shoot at a moving 30-inch target from 500 yards, in wind gusts up to 40 miles per hour. The four fastest times to hit it are safe from elimination.		Dustin, Jake, Phil, Alex
October 4, 2011	Elimination challenge weapon(s)	Elimination challenge	Nominated for elimination	Eliminated player
October 4, 2011	Walther P38 pistol	"Stacked Challenge": From 35 feet, shooters fire at separate sets of 36 targets holding up 8 planks in a vertical frame. They must work from the bottom up and are each given 30 rounds pre-loaded into magazines. First shooter to break all targets and drop the planks wins.	Gary, Mike	Mike

The trainer for both challenges was Craig "Sawman" Sawyer, Navy SEALs instructor and former sniper.

^7 There was a second-place tie between Chris and Mike. Each fired one shot at a target; the one who hit closer to the center was safe from elimination.

=== Episode 10: "Odd Man Out" ===
Premiere date	Individual challenge weapon(s)	Individual challenge		Winning player(s)
October 11, 2011	Infinity Sight Tracker race gun (.40 caliber)	"Infinity Speed Challenge": One shooter at a time fires at targets that randomly appear behind 12 4-inch holes in an 8-foot-diameter board wheel target at 35 feet. Each shooter gets 10 sets of random targets, 10 seconds per set. The three highest numbers of hits are safe from elimination; ties are broken by fewer rounds fired.		Dustin, Chris, Alex (Alex won in tie with Gary)
October 11, 2011	Elimination challenge weapon(s)	Elimination challenge	Nominated for elimination	Eliminated player(s)
October 11, 2011	Sako TRG rifle	"Zig-Zag Challenge": Using a kneeling position and a bipod, shooters fire at separate sets of 20 suspended light-fixture targets set 75-100 yards away in a zigzag pattern. Each is given 2 pre-loaded 10-round magazines and must work from closest to farthest away. First to hit all of his own targets wins.	Jake, Phil, Mike (reinstated)	Jake (QUIT), Phil

The trainer for the individual challenge was Taran Butler, national/world pistol champion. The trainer for the elimination challenge was Michael Voigt, president and CEO of the United States Practical Shooting Association.

Jake resigned from the competition after being nominated. As the last individual shooter eliminated before him, Mike returned to compete alongside Phil in the elimination challenge.

=== Episode 11: "Wheel of Fire" ===
Premiere date	Individual challenge weapon(s)	Individual challenge		Winning player(s)
October 18, 2011	Heckler & Koch SP89 pistol (based on the MP5K submachine gun)	"Roundabout Challenge": One shooter at a time fires at a 35-foot-diameter ring of 20 targets from 35 feet, while strapped to the end of a vertically rotating 16-foot arm. Each shooter is given one full revolution of the arm to get up to speed, then must fire during a second revolution using one 28-round magazine. The two highest numbers of hits are safe from elimination; ties are broken by fewer rounds fired.		Chris, Dustin
October 18, 2011	Elimination challenge weapon(s)	Elimination challenge	Nominated for elimination	Eliminated player(s)
October 18, 2011	Steyr SPP 9×19mm pistol (based on the Steyr TMP)	"Reverse Zipline Challenge": Fire at 20 ground targets placed among obstacles and debris while riding a zip-line backwards at 15 miles per hour. Higher number of hits wins.	Mike, Alex	Alex

The trainer for both challenges was Matt Burkett, practical shooting expert and weapons manufacturer.

=== Episode 12: "Season Three Finale" ===
No practice sessions were held in this episode. Each of the final two shooters had his wife and a friend watch the final challenge.

Premiere date	Elimination challenge weapon(s)	Elimination challenge	Winning player(s)	Eliminated player
October 25, 2011	Glock 34 9×19mm pistol	From 35 feet, two shooters at a time fire at 4 sets of 3 double-sided, moving targets. They have 45 seconds to flip as many as possible to their assigned color. The two first-round winners advance, with the losers competing against each other; the loser of this second round is eliminated.	1st round: Gary, Mike; 2nd round: Dustin	Chris
October 25, 2011	Handguns: Smith & Wesson Model 686 revolver, Infinity Sight Tracker race gun, Heckler & Koch SP89 pistol Rifles: Volquartsen .22 semiautomatic, AK-47, Winchester Model 1873	Two rounds are played, with each player choosing a weapon, target, stance, and distance in both; all three players try every shot. No weapon or target may be chosen more than once. After all six weapons have been used, the player with the fewest hits is eliminated. Targets available include golf balls, jugs, glasses, tin cans, and bottles.	Dustin, Mike	Gary
October 25, 2011	Final challenge weapon(s)	Final challenge	Eliminated player	Top Shot
October 25, 2011	Remington Model 1875 revolver Rock; Benelli M4 Super 90 shotgun loaded with 1-oz slugs Recurve bow LaRue Tactical Optimized Battle Rifle; Vltor TS3 rifle Smith & Wesson Model 500 revolver	Run a course with 7 shooting stations, crawling through a 25-foot sand pit under barbed wire to reach the first one.: 1. Use two Remingtons to hit 6 targets at 35 feet.; 2. From 15 feet, throw rocks at a square grid of 9 glass panes until 3 in a row are broken.; 3. Hit 10 jars at 40 yards with the Benelli.; 4. Using the bow, bounce an arrow off a metal ramp to hit a target 50 feet away.; 5. Climb a pole to an 8-foot-high shooting platform, then shoot targets at 100/200 yards from the prone position with the LaRue.; 6.Cross a rope to another platform and use the Vltor to hit targets at 75/100 yards while standing.: 7. Climb down, then shoot targets at 30/50/70 feet with the S&W.; First to complete the course wins.	Mike	Dustin

=== Epilogue: Behind the Bullet ===
Premiering after the final episode, Top Shot Season Three Behind the Bullet, was a one-hour documentary involving behind-the-scene interviews and footage taken before, during, and after the season three competition. At the end of the episode, the show profiled each of the contestants, post-competition.

- Amanda Hardin is training for a fitness competition. She would like to try hunting with her compound bow.
- Sara Ahrens is blogging and writing for Women's Outdoor News. She'll be attending the Shot Show in Las Vegas.
- Drew Shprintz just returned from a hunting safari in Africa. He's been working on tactical defensive shooting.
- Mark Schneider went on a shopping spree with his Bass Pro Shops gift card. He's excited to use his new gear on hunting trips.
- Jarret Grimes has been competing in the IDPA circuit. He recently returned from the Georgia State Championships.
- Paul Marinaccio is back on duty in his community which was ravaged by Hurricane Irene.
- Billy Rogers and his wife welcomed their healthy baby boy, Junior into the world. Billy competes locally in California.
- Michael Marelli has been giving private skeet and trap shooting lessons. He gave his Bass Pro Shops gift card to his grandfather.
- Cliff Walsh competed in October with the U.S. Revolver Team at the World Championships in Greece.
- Jake Zweig and his wife are expecting a baby in November. He currently coaches running backs at Bryant University in Rhode Island.
- Phil Morden started Run-N-Gun Productions, reviewing gear and firearms in web videos and DVD's.
- Alex Charvat has been shooting sporting clays with friends. He plans to enter upcoming USPSA competitions.
- Chris Collins has been working as a self-employed firearms instructor.
- Gary Quesenberry purchased a recurve bow. He is looking forward to deer hunting season with his brothers.
- Mike Hughes competed at the USPSA Production Nationals in September. He plans to start practicing three-gun.
- Dustin Ellermann has been busy with summer camp and retreat season. He plans on using his winnings to buy a new house for his growing family, including new daughter, Arrow.

== Nomination Range ==
		Original Teams									Merged Team						
#	Episode	1	2	3	4	5	6	7		8	9	10		11	12		
#	Nominated	Mark; 3/8 Votes	Dustin; 3/8 Votes	Cliff; 2/7 Votes	Michael; 3/6 Votes*	Mike; 2/7 Votes	Jake; 3/6 Votes	None	Cliff; 1/5 Votes	Chris; 2/4 Votes	Gary; 3/7 Votes	Jake; 3/6 Votes	Mike; Re-enter	Mike; 2/5 Votes	None	None	None
#	Eliminated	Amanda; 4/8 Votes	Sara; 3/8 Votes	Drew; 4/7 Votes	Mark; 3/6 Votes*	Jarrett; 3/7 Votes	Paul; 2/6 Votes	Billy; No Votes	Michael; 4/5 Votes	Cliff; 2/4 Votes	Mike; 2/7 Votes	Jake; Quit	Phil; 2/6 Votes	Alex; 2/5 Votes	Chris	Gary	Mike
#	Contestants	Votes															
1	Dustin		Billy			Jarrett	Jake	None			Chris	Jake	None	Alex	None	None	None
2	Mike		Dustin			Jarrett	Jake	None			Gary			Alex	None	None	None
3	Gary	Amanda		Cliff	Michael				Michael	Cliff	Chris	Jake	None	Mike	None	None	
4	Chris	None		Drew	Michael				Michael	Cliff	Gary	Phil	None	Mike	None		
5	Alex		Dustin			None	Jake	None			Mike	Phil	None	Gary			
6	Phil	Amanda		Drew	Mark				Michael	Chris	Gary	Jake	None				
7	Jake		Sara			Mike	Paul	None			Mike	Gary					
8	Cliff	Amanda		Drew	Chris				Michael	Chris							
9	Michael	Mark		None	Mark				Cliff								
10	Billy		Dustin			Jarrett	Paul	None									
11	Paul		Sara			Mike	Billy										
12	Jarrett		Sara			None											
13	Mark	Amanda		Drew	Chris												
14	Drew	Mark		Cliff													
15	Sara		Jake														
16	Amanda	Mark															

1. Episode 4: 3-way tie between Michael, Mark, and Chris; Gary and Cliff were chosen to break it by casting one more vote apiece.
2. Episode 9: 2-way tie between Mike and Chris; Chris won a shoot-off to avoid the elimination challenge.
3. Episode 10: After being nominated for the elimination challenge, Jake nailed his own plaque to the wall and quit the show. At practice the next morning, Donaldson announced that according to the rules, the last eliminated shooter would take his place. Mike therefore returned to the show and competed against Phil, winning the elimination challenge and re-entering the competition.
