= Grumman F2F =

US Navy biplane

F2F
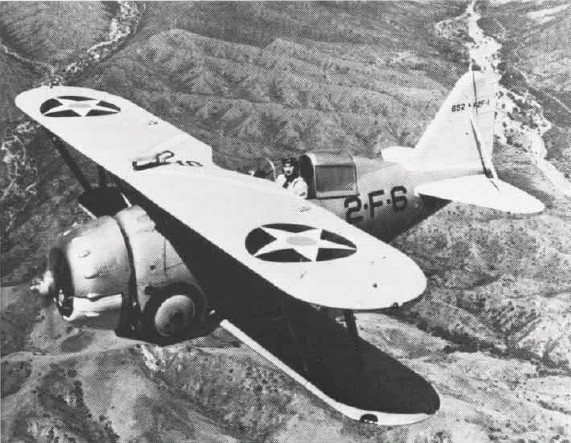
- An F2F-1 of fighter squadron VF-2B, aboard Lexington

General information
- Type: Naval fighter
- National origin: United States
- Manufacturer: Grumman
- Designer: Leroy Grumman
- Primary user: United States Navy
- Number built: 55

History
- Manufactured: 1934–1935
- Introduction date: 1935
- First flight: 18 October 1933
- Retired: 1940
- Variants: Grumman F3F

The Grumman F2F was a single-engine, biplane fighter aircraft with retractable undercarriage, serving as the standard fighter for the United States Navy between 1936 and 1940. It was designed for both carrier- and land-based operations.

== Design and development ==
Grumman's success with the two-seat FF-1, which was significantly faster than even the single-seat fighters of its time, resulted in a contract for the single-seat XF2F-1. Armed with two 0.30 in (7.62 mm) machine guns above the cowl, the new design also incorporated watertight compartments to reduce weight and improve survivability in the event of a water landing. The prototype first flew on 18 October 1933, equipped with the experimental 625 hp (466 kW) XR-1534-44 Twin Wasp Junior radial engine, and reached a top speed of 229 mph (369 km/h) at 8,400 ft (2,600 m) – 22 mph (35 km/h) faster than the FF-1 at the same altitude. Maneuverability also proved superior to the earlier two-seat aircraft.

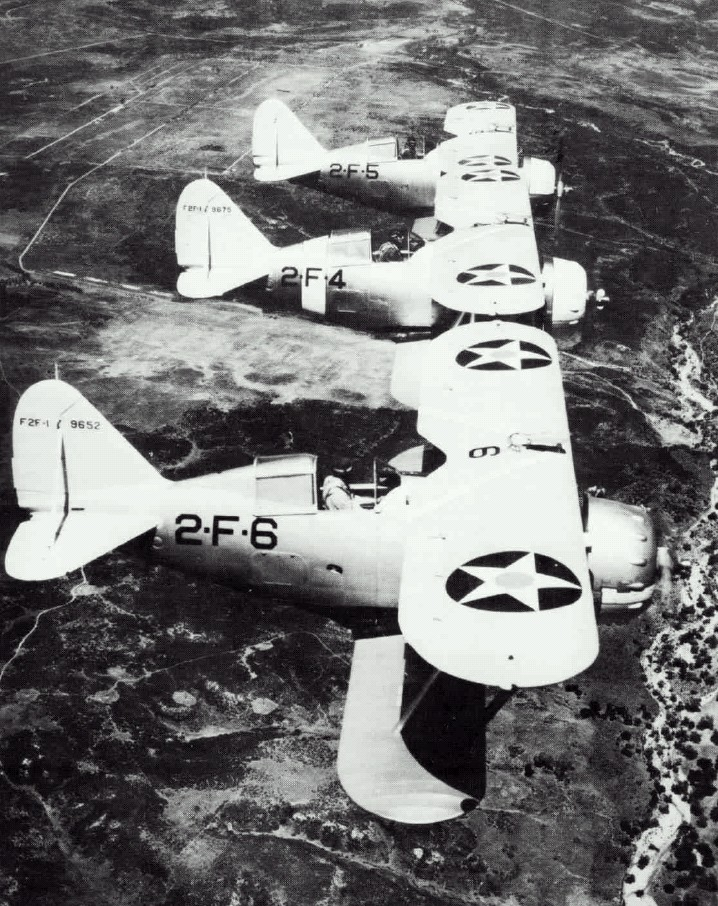
Three F2F-1s in service with fighter squadron VF-2B

== Operational history ==
The Navy ordered 54 F2F-1 fighters on 17 May 1934, with the first aircraft delivered 19 January 1935. One additional aircraft (BuNo 9997) was ordered to replace one which crashed on 16 March 1935, bringing the total to 55, with the final F2F-1 delivered on 2 August 1935. The F2F-1 had a relatively long service life for the time, serving in front-line squadrons from 1935 to late 1939, when squadrons began to receive the F3F-3 as a replacement. By September 1940, the F2F had been completely replaced in fighter squadrons and was relegated to training and utility duties. The last F2F-1s were stricken from the list of naval aircraft in early 1943.

== Variants ==
XF2F-1
United States Navy designation for the Grumman Model G-8 prototype with a 625 hp (466 kW) XR-1534-44 Twin Wasp Junior radial engine, one built
F2F-1
Production variant with a 700 hp (522 kW) R-1535-72 Twin Wasp Junior radial engine, 55 built

== Operators ==
United States

- United States Navy
  - VF-2B
  - VF-3B
  - VF-5B
  - VB-5B
  - VF-2
  - VF-5
  - VF-7
  - NAS Seattle
  - NAS Coco Solo
  - NAS Alameda
  - NAS Pearl Harbor
- United States Marine Corps
  - VF-4M
  - VMF-2

== Specifications (Grumman F2F-1) ==
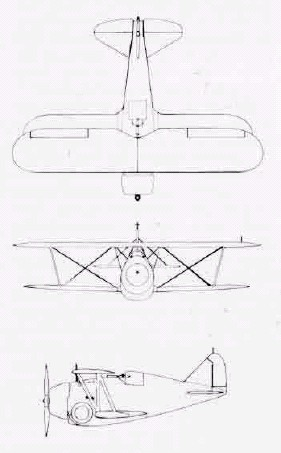
Three-view drawing of Grumman F2F-1

Data from United States Navy Aircraft since 1911

General characteristics

- Crew: One
- Length: 21 ft 5 in (6.53 m)
- Wingspan: 28 ft 6 in (8.69 m)
- Height: 9 ft 1 in (2.77 m)
- Wing area: 230 sq ft (21 m^{2})
- Empty weight: 2,691 lb (1,221 kg)
- Max takeoff weight: 3,847 lb (1,745 kg)
- Powerplant: 1 × Pratt & Whitney R-1535-72 Twin Wasp Junior radial engine, 700 hp (522 kW)

Performance

- Maximum speed: 231 mph (372 km/h, 201 kn)
- Range: 985 mi (1,585 km, 856 nmi)
- Service ceiling: 27,100 ft (8,260 m)
- Rate of climb: 2,050 ft/min (10.4 m/s)

Armament

- Guns: 2 × 0.30 in (7.62 mm) machine guns

== See also ==
Related development

- Grumman F3F

Related lists

- List of fighter aircraft
- List of United States naval aircraft
