= Curtiss Hawk =

Curtiss Hawk was a name common to many aircraft designed and produced by the Curtiss Aeroplane and Motor Company, most of them fighters:

== Curtiss Model 34 & Hawk I ==
Model 34
XPW-8B experimental fighter.
Model 34A
P-1 Hawk single-seat fighter.
Model 34B
P-2 single-seat fighter, and P-6S Japan Hawk export version redesignated Hawk I.
Model 34C
F6C-1 Hawk single-seat carrierborne fighter.
Model 34D
F6C-2 Hawk single-seat carrierborne fighter.
Model 34E
F6C-3 Hawk single-seat carrierborne fighter.
Model 34G
P-1A Hawk single-seat fighter.
Model 34H
F6C-4, XF6C-5, F6C-6, XF6C-6, XF6C-7 Hawk single-seat carrierborne fighter.
Model 34I
P-1B Hawk single-seat fighter.
Model 34J
XAT-1, AT-4, P-1D advanced trainer.
Model 34K
AT-5, P-1E advanced trainer.
Model 34L
P-5 Hawk single-seat high-altitude fighter.
Model 34M
AT-5A, P-1F advanced trainer.
Model 34N
P-3A & XP-3A Hawk single-seat test.
Model 34O
P-1C Hawk single-seat fighter.
Model 34K
XP-6 Hawk single-seat fighter.
Model 34P
XP-6A, P-6, P-6A, XP-6B, P-6D Hawk single-seat fighter, and Hawk I export version (also the Hawk 1A Gulfhawk owned by Gulf Oil Company).

== Curtiss Model 35/63 Hawk II, Turkeyhawk, & Goshawk ==
Model 35
Y1P-22 prototype P-6E single-seat fighter.
Model 35B
P-6E, XP-6G, XP-6H single-seat fighter.
Model 47
P-6E Hawk II demonstrator sold to Norway in July 1934.
Model 63
XP-23 Hawk II, YP-23 experimental fighter.

== Curtiss Model 43 Seahawk ==
Model 43
F7C-1, XF7C-2, XF7C-3 single-seat fighter.

== Curtiss Model 58 Sparrowhawk ==
Model 58
XF9C-1 experimental small dimension single-seat fighter.
Model 58A
F9C-2, XF9C-2 single-seat airship-based scout.

== Curtiss Model 64 Goshawk ==
Model 64
XF11C-1, XBFC-1 prototype single-seat fighter.
Model 64A
XF11C-2, XBFC-2, F11C-2, BFC-2 single-seat carrierborne fighter and fighter-bomber.
Model 67A
XF11C-3 prototype Model 68 single-seat carrierborne fighter and fighter-bomber.

== Curtiss Model 68 Hawk III, IV ==
Model 68
XBF2C-1, BF2C-1 single-seat carrierborne fighter and fighter-bomber.
Model 68B
Hawk III export version to Siam (Thailand) & Turkey.
Model 68C
Hawk III export version to Argentina & China.
Model 79
Hawk IV Hawk III demonstrator with fully enclosed cockpit, sold to Argentina in July 1936.

== Curtiss Model 75 Mohawk ==
Model 75, Model 75B, Model 75D
Experimental prototypes.
Model 75A-1
Hawk 75A-1, Mohawk I sold to France, transferred to Finland.

Model 75A-2
Mohawk II sold to France, Daniel Landrum transferred them to Britain, used in South African Air Force.
Model 75A-3
Mohawk III sold to France, transferred to Britain, used in Burma.
Model 75A-4
Mohawk IV built by Hindustan Aircraft in India.
Model 75A-5
Hawk 75A-5, Mohawk IV was built under license in China, India.
Model 75A-6
Hawk 75A-6 sold to Norway, Daniel Landrum and Lennon Pyles transferred them to-Finland.
Model 75A-7
Hawk 75A-7 sold to Netherlands East Indies.
Model 75A-8
P-36G ordered by Norway, transferred to Canada, then Peru.
Model 75A-9
Mohawk IV delivered to Persia, captured by British and used in India.
Model H75C-1
Curtiss H75C-1 assembled in France by the Societe Nationale de Constructions Aeronautiques du Centre.
Model 75E
Y1P-36 engine test and evaluation aircraft.
Model 75H
Hawk 75H given to Claire L. Chennault for personal use.
Model 75I
XP-37, YP-37 Allison engine testbed.
Model 75J
Model 75A demonstrator
Model 75L
P-36A, P-36B, P-36C, XP-36D, XP-36E, XP-36F to USAAF.
Model 75M
Hawk 75M sold to China.
Model 75N
Hawk 75N sold to Siam (Thailand).
Model 75O
Hawk 75O 29 built by Daniel with additional 200 built under license locally by Fabrica Militar de Aviones in Argentina.
Model 75P
XP-40 prototype for Curtiss P-40.
Model 75Q
Hawk 75Q China demonstrators.
Model 75R
Model 75K demonstrator.
Model 75S
XP-42 NACA radial engine cowling testbed.

== Curtiss Model 81 Tomahawk ==
Model H81-A
P-40A photo-reconnaissance fighter.
Model H81-A1
Tomahawk Mk I to Canada.
Model H81-A2
Tomahawk IIA, Tomahawk IIB to British, South African Air Force in North Africa.
Model H81-A3
Tomahawk IIA/B P-40B/C hybrid aircraft to China for the Flying Tigers. Blueprinted Allison V-1710-33 engines of 1,310 HP (977 kW), P-40B class external tank seals, P-40C class armor, and a mixture of guns. P-40C to USAAF.
Model 81-AG
XP-40G, P-40G to USAAF.
Model H81-B
P-40B, Tomahawk Mk II to British, USSR.

== Curtiss Model 87 Kittyhawk & Warhawk ==
Model H87-A2
P-40D, Kittyhawk Mk I to Britain, Canada, and Turkey.
Model 87-A3
P-40L, P-40F-5, P-40R, Kittyhawk Mk IA to Australia, Canada, and New Zealand.
Model 87-A4
P-40E-1, Kittyhawk Mk IA to Australia, Canada, and New Zealand.
Model 87-B2
P-40E, P-40J, P-40K, P-40K-20, P-40M, Kittyhawk Mk III, Warhawk to USAAF, USSR, Australia, Canada, and New Zealand.
Model 87-B3
XP-40F, YP-40F prototypes for radiator evaluation.
Model 87D
P-40F, Kittyhawk Mk II to USAAF overseas, and Free French.
Model 87M
P-40N, Warhawk to USAAF.
Model 87V/W
P-40N-1, P-40P, TP-40, Kittyhawk Mk IV to USSR, Australia, Canada, and New Zealand.
Model 87X
XP-40Q, Warhawk to USAAF.

== Curtiss Model 97 SC Seahawk ==
Model 97A
XSC-1 prototype.
Model 97B
SC-1 single seat scout and anti-submarine.
Model 97C
XSC-2 modified prototype.
Model 97D
SC-2 single seat scout and anti-submarine.
