= Dustin Ellermann =

American sport shooter

- Born: USA
- Occupation: Christian camp director
- Known for: Competitive shooter, winner of Top Shot season 3

Dustin Ellermann is a competitive shooter and director of Christian camp His Way. He is known for being the winner of the third season of History Channel's marksmen competition Top Shot.

== Biography ==
Ellermann was born in the US to Rick and Lisa Ellermann. He has a sister named Risa. The Ellermanns founded Camp His Way in 1996, in Zavalla, Texas, near Angelina National Forest. The family moved to the camp grounds shortly after.

Dustin studied at Stephen F. Austin State University, graduating cum laude with a degree in Business Administration. After working at the camp for many years, Dustin became the camp director in 2005. He and his wife, Brittany, live at the camp grounds. They have five children, and foster children. Dustin is a self-taught shooter.

=== Top Shot ===
In 2011, Ellermann appeared in the third season of History Channel's marksmen competition Top Shot. During the first half of the competition, Ellermann competed as part of the Blue Team. His team ended up winning five challenges, and Dustin was nominated for elimination only once during that period. During the final half of the competition, Ellermann won four of the last individual challenges before the final. In the finale, he beat Mike Hughes to win the competition as well as $100,000.

Preceded by Chris Reed	Top Shot; Winner; Season 3 (2011)	Succeeded by Chris Cheng
