= Curtiss F6C Hawk =

Late 1920s American naval biplane fighter aircraft

F6C Hawk
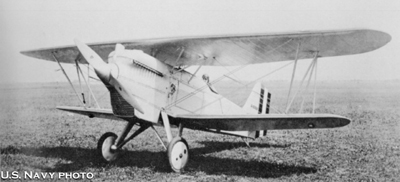
- Curtiss F6C-1 - Model 34

General information
- Type: Carrier-borne or land-based fighter
- Manufacturer: Curtiss Aeroplane and Motor Company
- Primary users: United States Navy United States Marine Corps
- Number built: 75

History
- Manufactured: 1927
- Introduction date: 1925

The Curtiss F6C Hawk is a late 1920s American naval biplane fighter aircraft. It was part of the long line of Curtiss Hawk airplanes built by the Curtiss Aeroplane and Motor Company for the American military.

Originally designed for land-based use, the Model 34C was virtually identical to the P-1 Hawk in United States Army Air Corps service. The United States Navy ordered nine, but starting with the sixth example, they were strengthened for carrier-borne operations and redesignated Model 34D. Flown from the carriers Langley and Lexington from 1927–30, most of the later variants passed to Marine fighter-bomber units, while a few were flown for a time as twin-float floatplanes.

== Operators ==
- United States
  - VF-9M (US Marines) operated 5 Model 34C, F6C-1 and XF6C-4 from land bases.
  - VF-2 (US Navy) operated 4 Model 34D, F6C-2 from Langley
  - VF-5S, later renamed VF-1B (US Navy) along with VF-8M (US Marines) operated 35 Model 34E, F6C-3 from Lexington
  - VF-2B (US Navy) operated 31 Model 34H, F6C-4 from Langley

== Variants ==
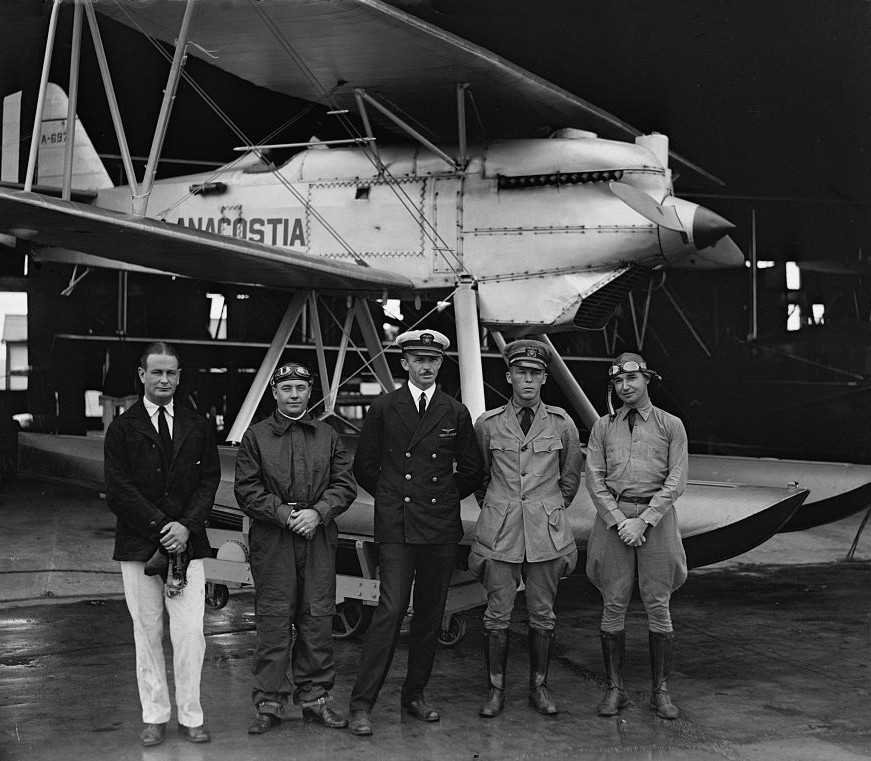
F6C racing plane.

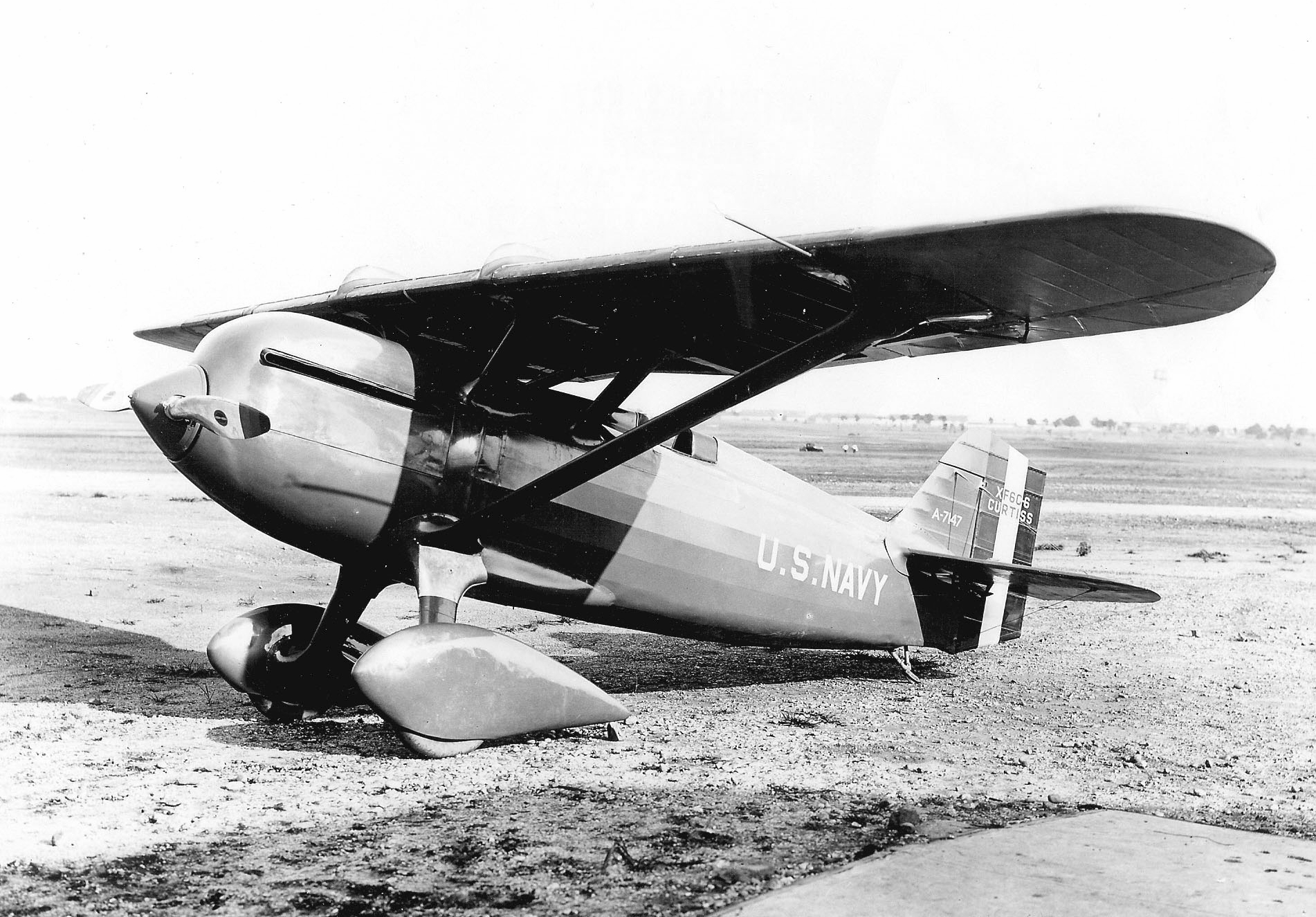
The XF6C-6

- F6C-1 Model 34C virtually identical to the P-1 series.
- F6C-2 Model 34D strengthened for carrierborne operations and fitted with arrester hooks.
- F6C-3 Model 34E modified version of the F6C-2.
- XF6C-4 Model 34H prototype F6C-1 with a Pratt & Whitney R-1340 Wasp radial engine.
- F6C-4 Model 34H production version of the XF6C-4.
- XF6C-5 Model 34H prototype F6C-1 with a Pratt & Whitney R-1690 Hornet radial of 525 hp (391 kW).
- F6C-6 Model 34E modified for racing, with its radiator located inside the fuselage.
- XF6C-6 Model 34E the F6C-6 which had won the 1930 Curtiss Marine Trophy was converted to parasol-wing monoplane configuration and given wing surface radiators; after achieving the fastest lap in the 1930 Thompson Trophy race the XF6C-6 crashed when its pilot was overcome by fumes.
- XF6C-7 Model 34H testbed for an experimental 350 hp (260 kW) Ranger SGV-770C-1 air-cooled inverted Vee engine.

== Specifications (F6C-4) ==
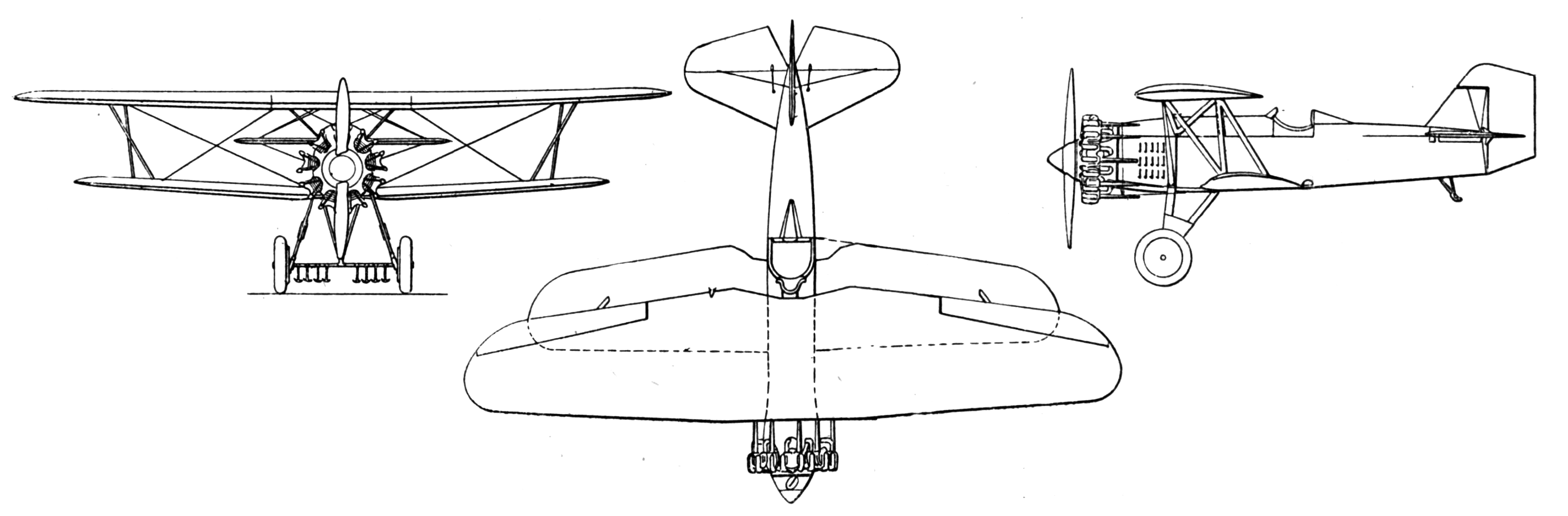
Curtiss F6C-4 3-view drawing from L'Aéronautique October,1927

Data from United States Navy Aircraft since 1911

General characteristics

- Crew: 1
- Length: 22 ft 6 in (6.86 m)
- Wingspan: 37 ft 6 in (11.43 m)
- Height: 10 ft 11 in (3.33 m)
- Wing area: 252 sq ft (23.4 m^{2})
- Airfoil: Clark Y
- Empty weight: 1,980 lb (898 kg)
- Max takeoff weight: 3,171 lb (1,438 kg)
- Powerplant: 1 × Pratt & Whitney R-1340 Wasp 9-cylinder air-cooled radial piston engine, 410 hp (310 kW)
- Propellers: 2-bladed metal propeller

Performance

- Maximum speed: 155 mph (249 km/h, 135 kn) at sea level
- Range: 360 mi (580 km, 310 nmi)
- Service ceiling: 22,900 ft (7,000 m)
- Time to altitude: 5,000 ft (1,500 m) in 2 minutes 30 seconds

Armament

- Guns: 2 × fixed .30 in (7.62 mm) Browning machine guns in the forward fuselage

== See also ==
Related development

- Curtiss P-1 Hawk
