= National Museum of World War II Aviation =

- Location within Colorado
- Established: 2008
- Location: Colorado Springs, Colorado
- Coordinates: 38.8212°N 104.7216°W
- Type: Military aviation museum
- Founder: Jim Fry
- Directors: Mark Earle; Tom Perkins
- President: Bill Klaers
- Chairperson: James Slattery
- Website: worldwariiaviation.org

The National Museum of World War II Aviation is an aviation museum located at Colorado Springs Airport in Colorado Springs, Colorado.

== History ==
The origins of the museum date to the founding of WestPac Restorations at Rialto Municipal Airport in Rialto, California in 1997 by Bill Klaers and Alan Wojciak. Due to the planned closure of the airport in 2014, Jim Fry convinced the owners to move the business to Colorado Springs Airport, where he had built three hangars in 2006. There the National Museum of World War II Aviation was established. It opened to the public six years later in October 2012.

In 2014, the museum received two grants totaling $6 million to build a 60,000 sq ft (5,600 m^{2}) "Aviation Hall". In 2016, Jim Slattery loaned 15 aircraft to the museum. WestPac filed for bankruptcy in September of the following year. In early 2018, it received an official "national museum" designation from the United States Congress. The museum began construction on a new 40,000 sq ft (3,700 m^{2}) hangar in November 2018. The museum received donations of a Lockheed P-38 Lightning and Stinson V-77 Reliant in late 2019.

Construction of the 40,000 sq ft (3,700 m^{2}) Kaija Raven Shook Aeronautical Pavilion was completed in 2019. The museum broke ground on a 40,000 sq ft (3,700 m^{2}) expansion to the Shook Pavilion in August 2025.

== Exhibits ==
The museum has a series of exhibits that trace the history of the United States' involvement in World War II.

The museum has several interactive displays and simulators including a fully functional Link trainer that is demonstrated daily. Simulators that visitors can experience include an N3N simulator and a modified Link Trainer. Projects under development include a bombardier simulator using a Norden bombsight and a simulated B-17 waist gunner position shooting down enemy aircraft.

== Collection ==
=== On display ===
- Beechcraft E18S
- Beechcraft T-34B Mentor
- Brewster F3A Corsair
- Canadian Vickers PBV-1A Canso
- Curtiss SB2C-1A Helldiver
- Cessna A-37 Dragonfly
- Cessna L-19 Bird Dog
- Douglas AD-5 Skyraider
- Douglas SBD-4 Dauntless
- Fairchild PT-19
- Grumman F3F
- Grumman F7F-3 Tigercat
- Grumman F7F-3 Tigercat
- Grumman G-44 Widgeon
- Grumman HU-16 Albatross
- General Motors TBM Avenger
- General Motors TBM Avenger
- Howard DGA-15
- Lockheed P-38 Lightning
- North American T-6 Texan
- North American T-28 Trojan
- North American TB-25N Mitchell
- Republic P-47D Thunderbolt
- Stinson L-5B Sentinel
- Stinson V77 Reliant
- Vought F4U Corsair
- Waco JYM

=== Under restoration ===
- Beechcraft Model 18
- Fairchild PT-19
- Grumman F6F Hellcat
- Grumman F6F Hellcat
- Lockheed P-38 Lightning
- Naval Aircraft Factory N3N
- North American B-25 Mitchell
- Republic P-47 Thunderbolt
- Vought F4U-4 Corsair
- Vultee SNV-1

=== Land vehicles ===
In addition to its aircraft, the museum also maintains a collection of land vehicles:

- Chevrolet Crash Truck
- Ford GPW
- White M2A1
- White M3A1
