= Zavalla High School =

Public school in Texas, United States

Location
- 431 East Main Street; Zavalla, Angelina County, Texas 75980-0045; United States; 31.158918°N 94.420739°W

Information
- School type: Public, high school
- Locale: Rural: Remote
- School district: Zavalla ISD
- NCES School ID: 484674005354
- Principal: Kathy Caton
- Teaching staff: 16.25 (on an FTE basis)
- Grades: 6–12
- Enrollment: 155 (2023–2024)
- Student to teacher ratio: 9.54
- Colors: Blue & Gold
- Athletics conference: UIL Class A
- Mascot: Eagle
- Yearbook: Eagles Flight
- Website: Zavalla High School

Zavalla High School is a public high school located in Zavalla, Texas (USA) and classified as a 1A school by the UIL. It is part of the Zavalla Independent School District located in southern Angelina County. During 2023–2024, Zavalla High School had an enrollment of 155 students and a student to teacher ratio of 9.54. The school received an overall rating of "C" from the Texas Education Agency for the 2024–2025 school year.

== Athletics ==
The Zavalla Eagles compete in these sports -

- Baseball
- Basketball
- Cross Country
- Softball
- Track and Field
