= Zavalla, Texas =

- City
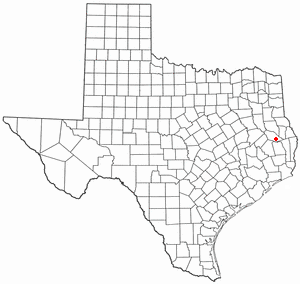
- Location of Zavalla, Texas

- Coordinates: 31°09′30″N 94°25′05″W
- Country: United States
- State: Texas
- County: Angelina
- Established: 1900

Area
  - Total: 2.10 sq mi (5.44 km^{2})
  - Land: 2.09 sq mi (5.41 km^{2})
  - Water: 0.015 sq mi (0.04 km^{2})
- Elevation: 253 ft (77 m)

Population (2020)
  - Total: 603
  - Density: 340.1/sq mi (131.31/km^{2})
- Time zone: UTC-6 (Central (CST))
  - Summer (DST): UTC-5 (CDT)
- ZIP code: 75980
- Area code: 936
- FIPS code: 48-80728
- GNIS feature ID: 2412330
- Website: www.cityofzavalla.com

Zavalla is a city in Angelina County, Texas, United States. The population was 603 at the 2020 census.

== History ==
Zavalla was established in 1900 when the Texas and New Orleans Railroad was built through the area and was initially called Zavalla Prairie. It was named for the Tejano politician and diplomat Lorenzo de Zavala. A post office was built in 1901. Zavalla had a population of 100 to 200 people in its first few decades, which increased to 450 by 1945 and to 900 in 1974 before declining.

Zavalla was officially incorporated in 1975 due to the expansion of the nearby Sam Rayburn Reservoir, having been an unincorporated community since its establishment.

The Zavalla Police Department disbanded in May 2026 after a Texas Commission on Law Enforcement investigation found that department failed to meet state safety standards.

== Demographics ==
Historical population
Census	Pop.	Note	%±
1980	762		—
1990	701		−8.0%
2000	647		−7.7%
2010	713		10.2%
2020	603		−15.4%
U.S. Decennial Census

=== 2020 census ===
As of the 2020 census, there were 603 people, 231 households, and 191 families residing in the city.

The median age was 38.8 years. 26.4% of residents were under the age of 18 and 16.4% of residents were 65 years of age or older. For every 100 females there were 86.7 males, and for every 100 females age 18 and over there were 82.0 males age 18 and over.

0.0% of residents lived in urban areas, while 100.0% lived in rural areas.

There were 231 households in Zavalla, of which 37.7% had children under the age of 18 living in them. Of all households, 38.1% were married-couple households, 18.2% were households with a male householder and no spouse or partner present, and 37.2% were households with a female householder and no spouse or partner present. About 25.1% of all households were made up of individuals and 11.7% had someone living alone who was 65 years of age or older.

There were 306 housing units, of which 24.5% were vacant. The homeowner vacancy rate was 3.0% and the rental vacancy rate was 5.1%.

Racial composition as of the 2020 census
Race	Number	Percent
White	539	89.4%
Black or African American	5	0.8%
American Indian and Alaska Native	11	1.8%
Asian	0	0.0%
Native Hawaiian and Other Pacific Islander	0	0.0%
Some other race	0	0.0%
Two or more races	48	8.0%
Hispanic or Latino (of any race)	23	3.8%

=== 2000 census ===
As of the 2000 census, there were 647 people, 268 households, and 176 families residing in the city. The population density was 306.6 inhabitants per square mile (118.4/km^{2}). There were 340 housing units at an average density of 161.1 per square mile (62.2/km^{2}). The racial makeup of the city was 97.68% White, 0.46% Native American, 0.15% Asian, 0.62% from other races, and 1.08% from two or more races. Hispanic or Latino of any race were 2.01% of the population.

There were 268 households, out of which 34.0% had children under the age of 18 living with them, 48.1% were married couples living together, 12.7% had a female householder with no husband present, and 34.0% were non-families. 30.6% of all households were made up of individuals, and 15.3% had someone living alone who was 65 years of age or older. The average household size was 2.41 and the average family size was 2.99.

In the city, the population was spread out, with 26.6% under the age of 18, 9.0% from 18 to 24, 26.1% from 25 to 44, 24.7% from 45 to 64, and 13.6% who were 65 years of age or older. The median age was 36 years. For every 100 females, there were 87.5 males. For every 100 females age 18 and over, there were 87.7 males.

The median income for a household in the city was $21,806, and the median income for a family was $28,750. Males had a median income of $30,577 versus $20,000 for females. The per capita income for the city was $13,049. About 22.0% of families and 28.1% of the population were below the poverty line, including 36.6% of those under age 18 and 16.8% of those age 65 or over.

== Education ==
- Zavalla is served by the Zavalla Independent School District and home to the Zavalla High School Eagles.

== Notable people ==
- Dustin Ellermann, winner of Season 3 of the shooting competition show Top Shot
- Arthur Hawkins, Captain, U.S. Navy's 10th leading ace with 14 aerial victories in WW II
