= VF-7 =

Fighter Squadron 7
- Active: 3 January 1944 – 8 June 1946
- Country: United States
- Branch: United States Navy
- Aircraft: F6F-3/5 Hellcat
- Engagements: World War II

Fighter Squadron 7 or VF-7 was an aviation unit of the U.S. Navy, originally established on 3 January 1944, it was disestablished on 8 June 1946. It was the second US Navy squadron to be designated VF-7.

== Operational history ==
VF-7 equipped with the F6F-3 Hellcat was deployed as part of Carrier Air Group 7 (CVG-7) aboard the USS Hancock in the Atlantic Fleet. VF-7 reequipped with the F6F-5 Hellcat at Naval Air Station Quonset in July 1944 and then reembarked on USS Hancock.

By September 1944 USS Hancock and CVG-7 had joined the Pacific Fleet. Hancock fought in the Philippines campaign (1944-45), including in the Battle of Leyte Gulf, at the Battle of Iwo Jima, and in the Battle of Okinawa.

From February–September 1945 CVG-7 was shore-based at Naval Station Puget Sound and then Naval Air Station Astoria.

== Home port assignments ==
- Naval Air Station Quonset
- Naval Station Puget Sound
- Naval Air Station Astoria

== Aircraft assignment ==
- F6F-3/5 Hellcat
