= Zavalla Independent School District =

School district in Texas, United States

Coordinates: 31°9′29″N 94°25′8″W

Address
- 431 East Main Street ESC Region 7 Zavalla, Texas; United States

District information
- Type: Public Independent school district
- Grades: Pre-K through 12
- Superintendent: Ricky Oliver
- Schools: 2
- NCES District ID: 4846740

Students and staff
- Students: 320 (2023–2024)
- Teachers: 33.81 (on an FTE basis) (2023–2024)
- Staff: 23.22 (on an FTE basis) (2023–2024)
- Student–teacher ratio: 9.46 (2023–2024)

Other information
- Website: www.zavallaisd.org

Zavalla Independent School District is a public school district based in Zavalla, Texas (USA). The district covers much of the southeastern corner of Angelina County.

In 2009, the school district was rated "academically acceptable" by the Texas Education Agency.

== Schools ==
In the 2012-2013 school year, the district had students in three schools.

High schools

- Zavalla Junior High/High School (Grades 6-12)

Elementary schools

- Zavalla Elementary School (Grades PK-5).

Alternative schools

- Stubblefield Learning Center (Grades 9-12)
