= VFA-31 =

Strike Fighter Squadron 31
- VFA-31 insignia
- Active: 1 July 1935 - Present
- Allegiance: United States
- Branch: United States Navy
- Type: Fighter/Attack
- Role: Close air support Air interdiction Aerial reconnaissance
- Part of: Carrier Air Wing One
- Garrison/HQ: NAS Oceana
- Nickname: "Tomcatters"
- Motto: We Get Ours at Night
- Colors: Yellow and Black
- Mascot: Felix the Cat
- Engagements: World War II; Korean War; Six-Day War; Vietnam War; Multinational Force in Lebanon; Operation Earnest Will; Operation Provide Comfort; Operation Southern Watch; *Operation Desert Strike; Iraq War; Operation Enduring Freedom; Operation Inherent Resolve; Operation Southern Spear; Operation Epic Fury

Commanders
- Current commander: CDR Jordan A. Mayo

Aircraft flown
- Fighter: F3F; F4F Wildcat; F6F Hellcat; F8F Bearcat; F9F Panther; F2H Banshee; F3H Demon; F-4 Phantom II; F-14 Tomcat; F/A-18E Super Hornet

VFA-31 or Strike Fighter Squadron 31 is known as the Tomcatters, callsign "Felix", a United States Navy strike fighter squadron stationed at Naval Air Station Oceana flying the F/A-18E Super Hornet. The Tomcatters are the second-oldest Navy Fighter Attack squadron operating today.

== Squadron insignia and nickname ==
The squadron was originally known as the Shooting Stars. The original "Felix the Cat" squadron was VF-3. After the Battle of Midway, VF-3 and VF-6 swapped designations on 15 July 1943, resulting in a three-year controversy as to which squadron owned the Felix name and emblem until VF-3 was re-designated VF-3A on 15 November 1946, and awarded the official approval to adopt Felix the Cat by the Chief of Naval Operations (CNO). VF-3A was then re-designated VF-31 on 7 August 1948.

The emblem and mascot are the famous cartoon character Felix the Cat, running with a large spherical black bomb with a lit fuse. The yellow field and outline were omitted from the aircraft and four stars at the end of a pair of sweeps were added. This emblem can be seen on the fuselage of the aircraft above the wing.

Several well-known aviators have flown with Felix on their shoulders, including Charles Lindbergh and Butch O'Hare.

The nickname Tomcatters was adopted in 1948.

== History ==
Two US Navy squadrons have held the designation VF-31. The first to be designated VF-31 was in existence from May 1943 to Oct 1945 and is not related to the subject of this article. The second VF-31 has a direct lineage to the current VFA-31 " Tomcatters".

=== Early years ===
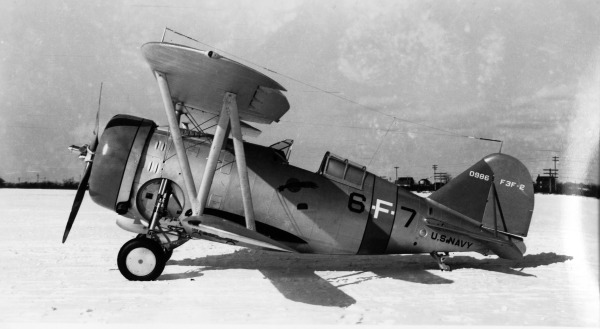
VF-6 F3F-2 in the late 1930s.

VFA-31, was originally established as VF-1B on 1 July 1935, flying the F4B, making it the second-oldest active US Navy squadron behind VFA-14, which was originally established in 1919.

On 1 July 1937, the squadron combined with VF-8B and was redesignated VF-6, flying the F3F. Between the years 1937 and 1943 VF-6 flew the F3F-1 and two variants of the F4F Wildcat and ended with the F4F-4.

On 15 July 1943, VF-6 swapped designations with VF-3 and began flying the F6F Hellcat.

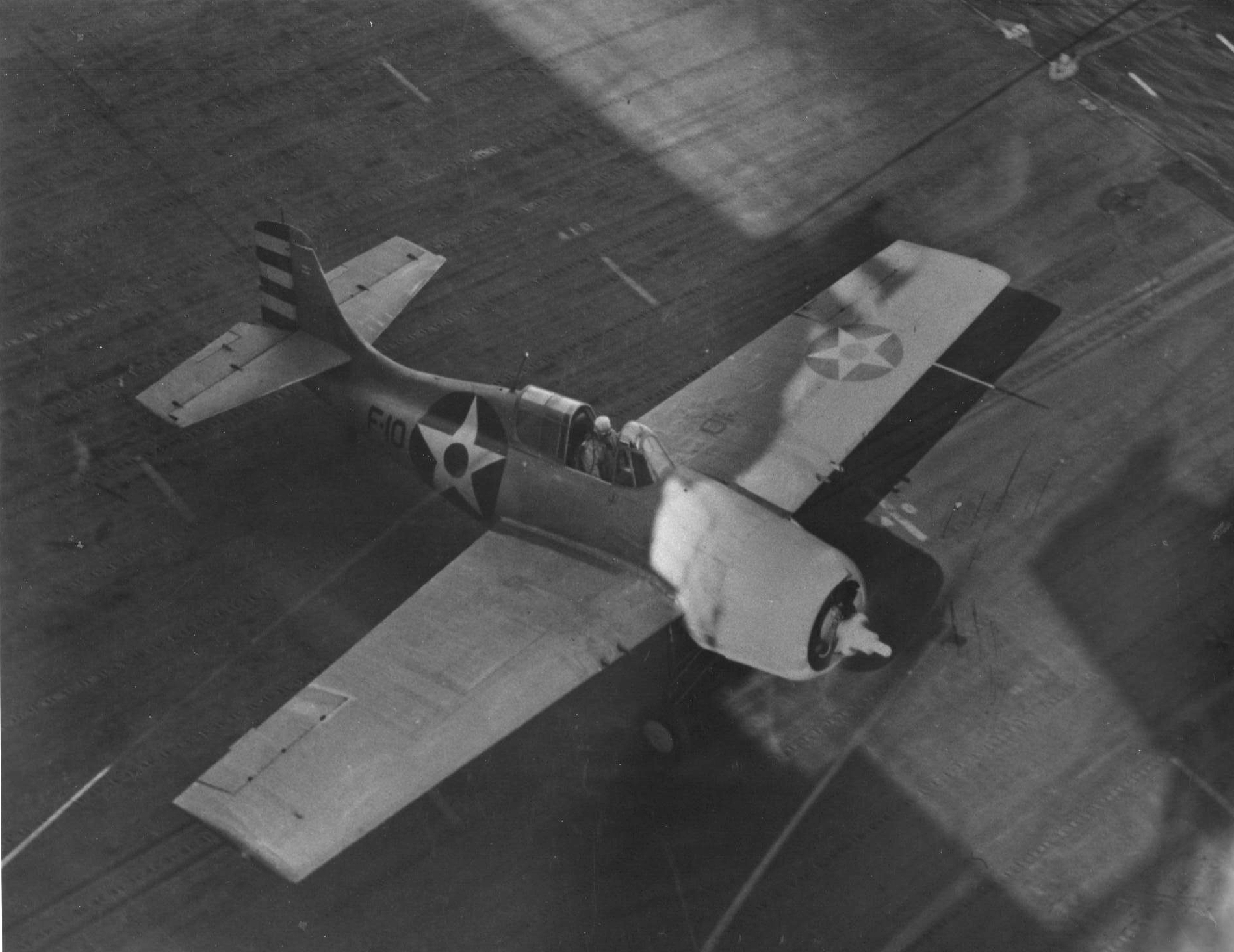
A VF-6 F4F-3 aboard USS Enterprise, March 1942.

Through the years the squadron and their predecessors have served on many of the Navy's early aircraft carriers, including the first, USS Langley; the second, USS Lexington; and the sixth, USS Enterprise. They were aboard Enterprise during the Attack on Pearl Harbor as well as the battles of Wake Island, Marcus Island, Midway, Guadalcanal, and the Eastern Solomon Islands. The squadron also saw aerial combat over the Philippines, Formosa, Okinawa, and China.

On 7 August 1948, VF-3A was redesignated VF-31. For almost four years, the squadron flew the F9F Panther, the squadron's first jet aircraft.

=== 1950s ===
In 1952, the squadron transitioned to the F2H Banshee, and then switched to the F3H Demon in 1957, flying it through 1962.

=== 1960s ===
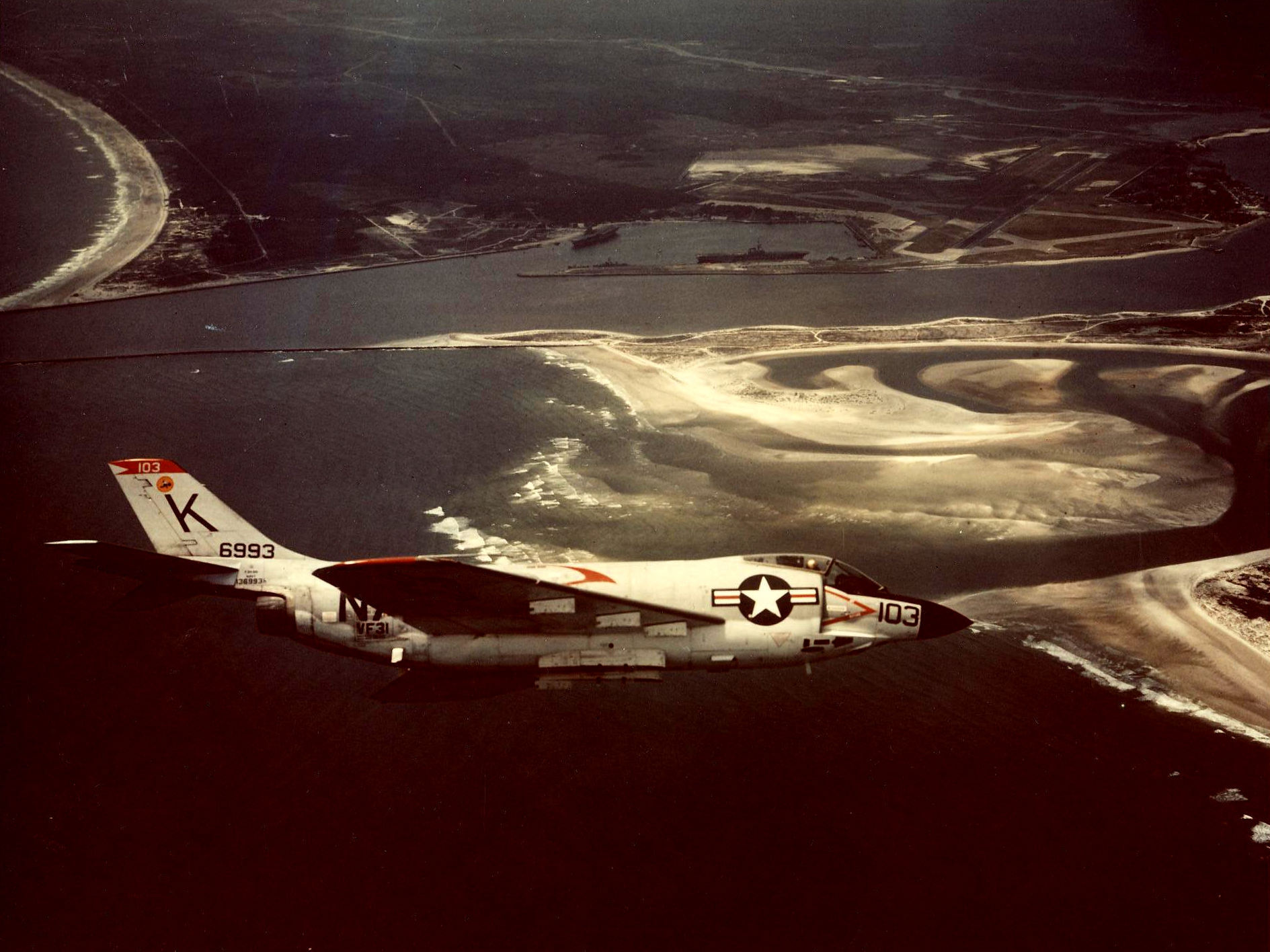
VF-31 F3H-2N Demon in 1957.

VF-31 transitioned to the F-4 Phantom II in 1964, flying the B model for two years before transitioning to the F-4J.

=== 1970s ===
In 1972, squadron aircraft shot down a MiG-21 over North Vietnam with a F-4J Phantom and in doing so made VF-31 the only Navy fighter squadron to achieve aerial victories in three wars – World War II, the Korean War and the Vietnam War.

=== 1980s ===
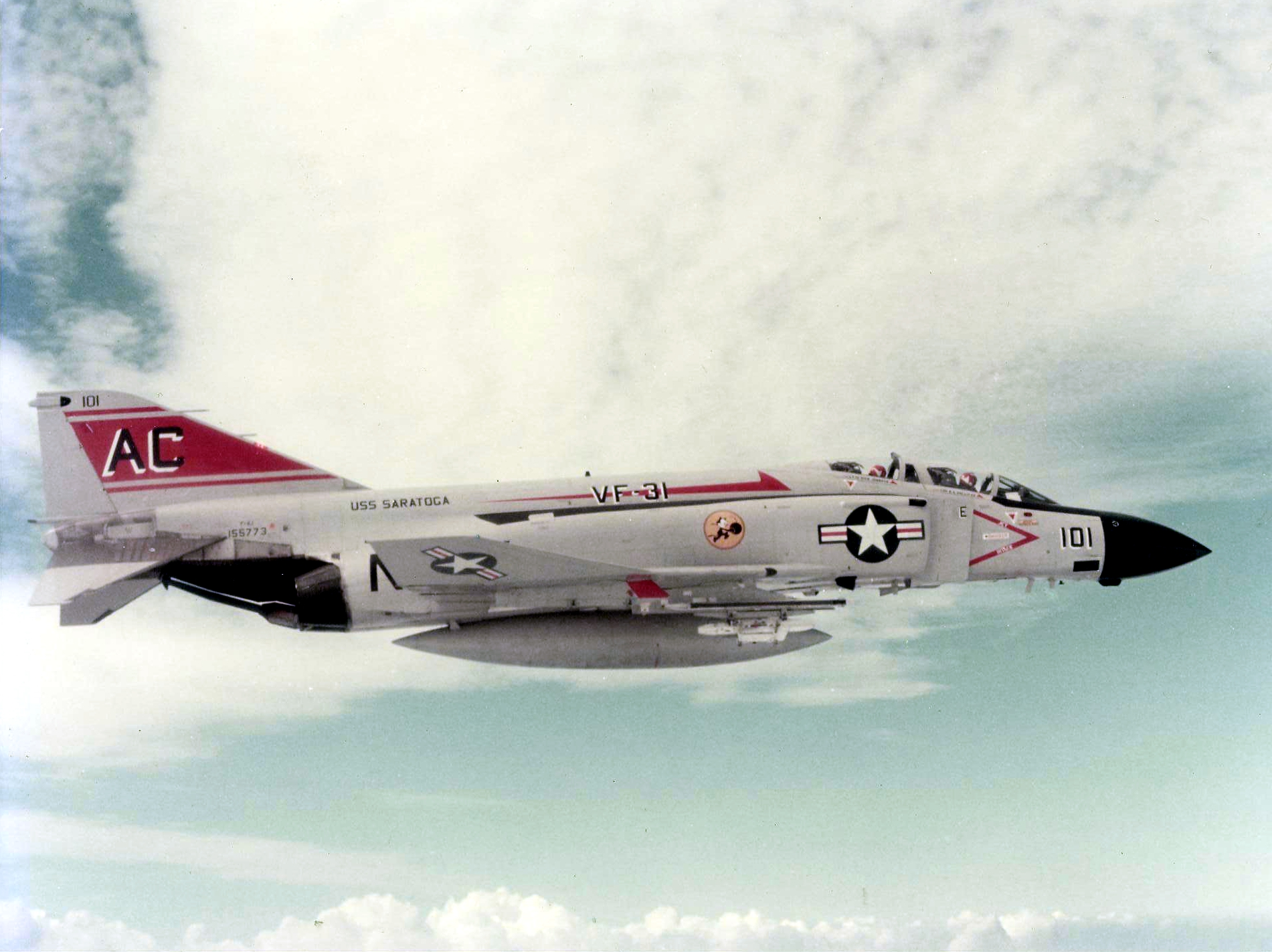
VF-31 F-4J in 1978.

In 1980, VF-31 and USS Saratoga concluded a 24-year period of continuous service together, the longest in US naval history.

VF-31 received the F-14A Tomcat in early 1981. The squadron's first cruise was on board USS John F. Kennedy. In 1983, VF-31 embarked on its fourth cruise with Kennedy. The cruise took the carrier and its air wing to the southern Mediterranean off the North African coast. VF-31 regularly flew over Lebanese and Syrian positions in support of multi-national peacekeeping operations, often being fired at by Syrian AAA. During a mission in early December 1983, heat-seeking SA-7 SAMs were launched at two squadron F-14s. Although both Tomcats were able to return safely to Kennedy, this incident led to US Navy retaliatory strikes. On 4 December, both carriers in the Mediterranean Sea, Kennedy and USS Independence, launched strikes against Syrian SAM sites, losing one A-7 Corsair II and one A-6 Intruder.

VF-31 shifted carriers and air wings in April 1985 joining USS Forrestal along with its sister squadron, the VF-11 Red Rippers.

In June 1986, VF-31 and the rest of the Forrestal battle group set sail for the Mediterranean. While deployed the squadron participated in numerous fleet exercises. In August 1986, VF-31 participated in joint exercises with the Egyptian Air Force and Navy.

In September 1987, VF-31 and the Forrestal battle group participated in North Atlantic exercises above the Arctic Circle. In April, 1988 VF-31 and the Forrestal battle group set sail for a six-month Indian Ocean cruise which lasted for six months. Forrestal and CVW-6, with VF-31 attached, supported Operation Earnest Will, the escort of U.S. flagged tankers in the Persian Gulf. While heading home from the "IO", the battle group once again participated in North Atlantic NATO exercises before coming home to NAS Oceana.

=== 1990s ===
During May 1991, VF-31 and other CVW-6 squadrons on the Forrestal participated in Operation Provide Comfort, flying missions over northern Iraq in support of the Kurdish relief effort. VF-31 stayed with Forrestal until 1992, when the squadron switched carriers, planes and home bases. VF-31 (and VF-11) moved from NAS Oceana to NAS Miramar and to USS Carl Vinson, and exchanged its F-14As for the new and improved F-14Ds.

In late 1996, VF-31 returned from its second Western Pacific deployment aboard USS Carl Vinson, flying missions in the Persian Gulf and over southern Iraq in support of Operations Southern Watch and Desert Strike.

VF-31 moved back to NAS Oceana in 1997. The squadron sent a single F-14D and crew to the 1997 Paris Air Show, primarily to promote new F-14 LANTIRN.

In 1998 the squadron made a deployment to the Persian Gulf with USS Abraham Lincoln supporting Operation Southern Watch.

=== 2000s ===
2000 began with a WESTPAC deployment on board USS Abraham Lincoln.

VF-31 deployed aboard USS Abraham Lincoln in July 2002, operating over Afghanistan in support of Operation Enduring Freedom, and again over the skies of Iraq supporting Operation Southern Watch. During their return home, the entire battle group was turned around on 1 January for the commencement of Operation Iraqi Freedom. Flying from the first night of combat, VF-31 was responsible for delivering ordnance to targets in Baghdad and the southern vicinities in direct support of coalition forces. During that deployment, VF-31 had the dubious distinction of having the longest cruise in the last 30 years of the Navy's history, returning to NAS Oceana on 2 May 2003. The squadron flew 585 sorties, dropping 276 LGB/JDAM/MK 82.

In 2004, VF-31 and CVW-14 embarked on USS John C. Stennis for a WESTPAC cruise, returning to the US on 31 October 2004.

In December 2004, VF-31 transferred from Carrier Air Wing Fourteen to its current home with Carrier Air Wing Eight and USS Theodore Roosevelt.

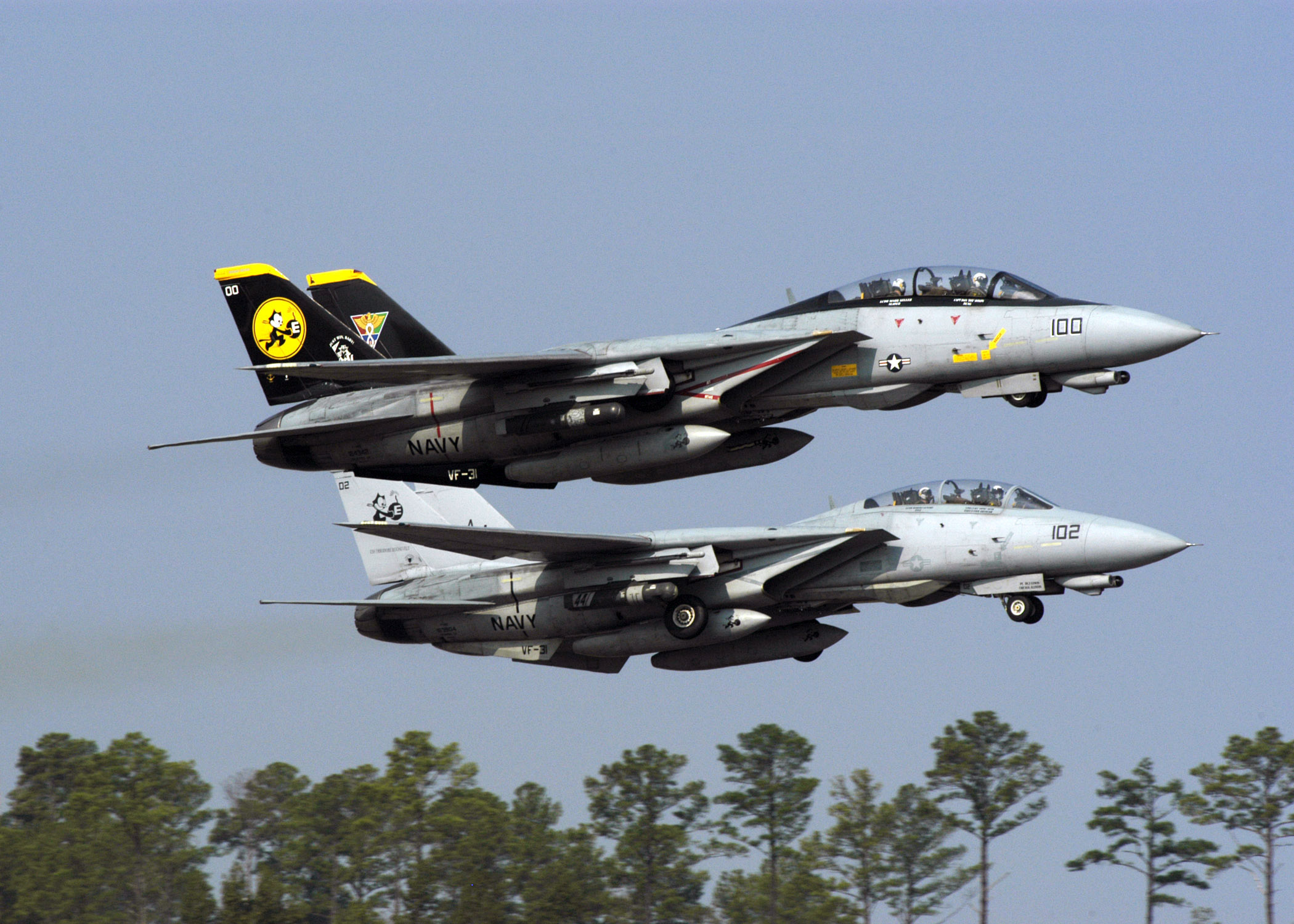
VF-31 F-14Ds in 2006.

In September 2005, the squadron deployed aboard USS Theodore Roosevelt with CVW-8 for the final F-14 deployment, again to the Persian Gulf. 7 February 2006 marked the last recovery of an F-14 Tomcat from a combat mission. While operating from Theodore Roosevelt in support of Operation Iraqi Freedom, VF-31 was credited with being the last F-14 unit to drop a bomb in combat. VF-31 returned to NAS Oceana on 10 March 2006, for the final F-14 fly-in.

VF-31 remained operational aboard Theodore Roosevelt until 28 July 2006, when the last Tomcat landing and catapult launch took place off the Virginia Capes, with journalists from around the world (Mexico, UK, Holland, Germany and US) witnessing. VF-31 was the last Tomcat squadron, with the last F-14 flight occurring on 4 October 2006, as BuNo.164603 flew from NAS Oceana to Republic Airport. After spending a year at the American Airpower Museum, the aircraft is now on static display outside of the former Grumman Aerospace Corporation headquarters in Bethpage, NY.

VF-31 transitioned to F/A-18E Super Hornet and was redesignated VFA-31 in late 2006.

VFA-31, along with CVW-8 and Theodore Roosevelt, participated in Joint Task Force Exercise 08-4 Operation Brimstone off the coast of North Carolina between 21 July – 31 July 2008. The British carrier HMS Ark Royal, the amphibious assault ship USS Iwo Jima with associated units and the Brazilian Navy frigate Greenhalgh and the French submarine Améthyste also participated in the event.

On 8 September 2008, VFA-31 and the rest of CVW-8 deployed on board USS Theodore Roosevelt on a regularly scheduled deployment. On 4 October, the Theodore Roosevelt Carrier Group arrived in Cape Town, South Africa, the first visit by an American aircraft carrier since 1967 and three days later the carrier left Cape Town. CVW-8 and CVN-71 supported Operation Enduring Freedom and flew more than 3,100 sorties and dropped more than 59,500 pounds of ordnance while providing close air support for ISAF-forces in Afghanistan.

=== 2010s ===
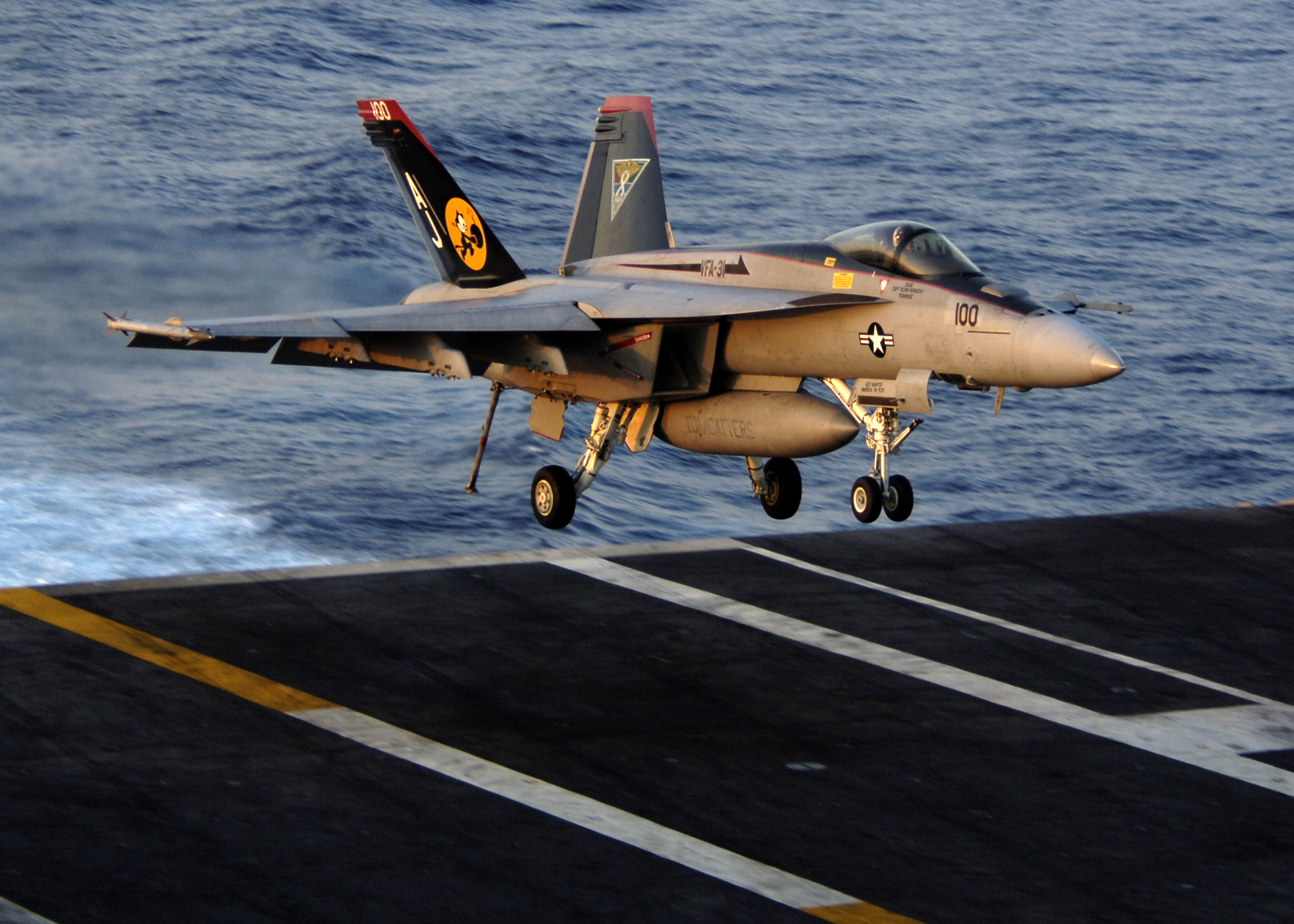
VFA-31 F/A-18E makes an arrested landing

On 11 May 2011, the squadrons of CVW-8 embarked on USS George H.W. Bush's maiden deployment, to conduct operations in the US 5th and 6th Fleet areas of operations. returning to NAS Oceana in December, 2011, days before the return of USS George H.W. Bush. VFA-31 flew extensive ground attack missions in Operation Inherent Resolve against IS targets in Syria, and peacefully intercepted MiG 29s.

=== 2025-2026 ===
In November 2025, VFA-31 within CVW-8 onboard the USS Gerald R Ford were re-tasked from their scheduled deployment in the Mediterranean and sent to the Caribbean to support Operation Southern Spear. After completing their support of Southern Spear in early February 2026, VFA-31 and CVW-8 were again deployed across the Atlantic and into the Mediterranean to support potential combat operations against Iran.

In late Feb 2026, VFA-31 and their F/A-18Es undertook combat sorties within Operation Epic Fury against Iran. Combat sorties off the Ford began from the Eastern Mediterranean and moved to the Red Sea after close to a week of combat.

== Awards ==
During its long history, the squadron has received the Commander Naval Air Force, U.S. Atlantic Fleet Battle Effectiveness Award for the best fighter squadron in the Atlantic Fleet, the Admiral Joseph C. Clifton Award for the top fighter squadron in the Navy, the Wade McClusky Award as most outstanding attack squadron in the Navy, the Chief of Naval Operations Safety "S" award, and the Arleigh Burke Award, which is awarded "to the ship or squadron with the most improved battle efficiency".

In 1974, VF-31 was awarded the Presidential Unit Citation for excellence in combat during deployment to Vietnam in 1972–1973.

== See also ==
- Naval aviation
- Modern US Navy carrier air operations
- List of United States Navy aircraft squadrons
- List of Inactive United States Navy aircraft squadrons
