= Grumman F3F =

US Navy biplane

F3F
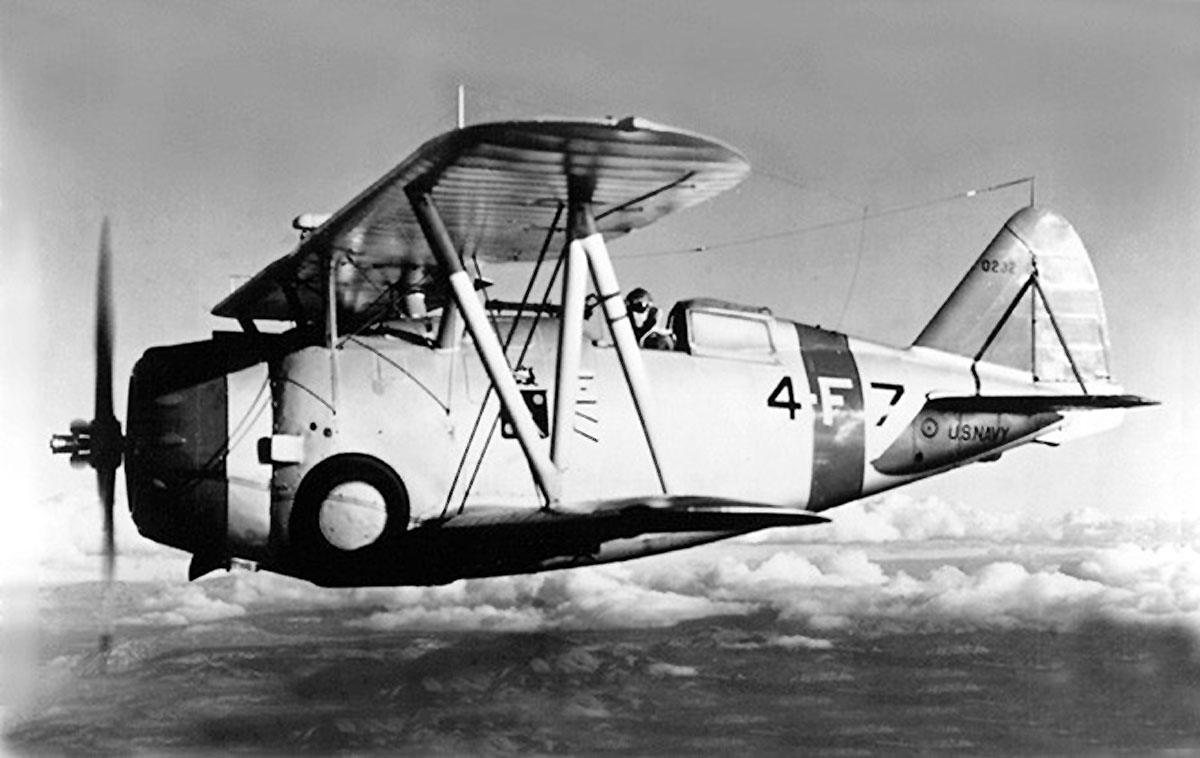
- An F3F-1 of VF-4 in the late 1930s

General information
- Type: Fighter aircraft
- National origin: United States
- Manufacturer: Grumman
- Designer: Leroy Grumman
- Primary users: United States Navy United States Marine Corps
- Number built: 147

History
- Manufactured: 1936–1939
- Introduction date: 1936
- First flight: 20 March 1935
- Retired: November 1943
- Developed from: Grumman F2F

The Grumman F3F is a single-seat biplane fighter aircraft produced by the Grumman aircraft for the United States Navy during the mid-1930s. Designed as an improved F2F, it entered service in 1936 as the last biplane fighter to be delivered to any American military air arm. It was retired from front line squadrons at the end of 1941 before World War II, and replaced by the Brewster F2A Buffalo. The F3F inherited the Leroy Grumman-designed retractable main landing gear first used on the Grumman FF, and was the basis for a biplane design ultimately developed into the F4F Wildcat.

== Design and development ==
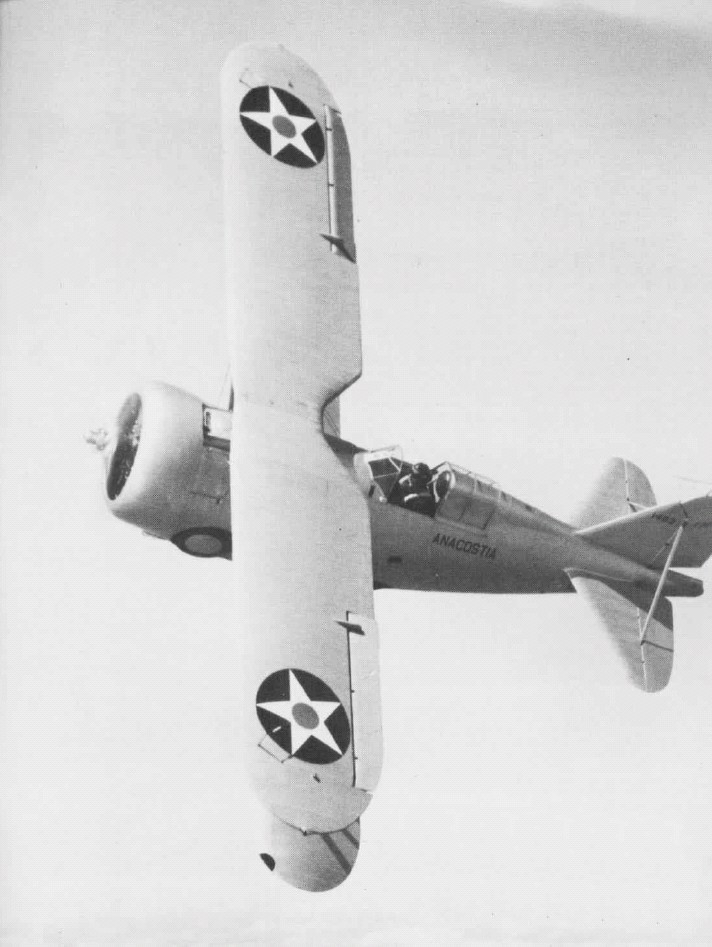
F3F-3 assigned to Naval Air Station Anacostia

The Navy's experience with the F2F revealed problems with stability and poor spin recovery, prompting the 15 October 1934 contract for the improved XF3F-1, placed before F2F deliveries began. The contract also required a capability for ground attack, in addition to the design's fighter role. Powered by the same Pratt & Whitney R-1535-72 Twin Wasp Junior engine as the F2F, the fuselage was lengthened and wing area increased. A reduction in wheel diameter improved streamlining, and eliminated a prominent bulge behind the cowling of the F2F.

The prototype, BuNo. 9727, was delivered and first flown on 20 March 1935 with company test pilot making three flights that day. Two days later, six dive-recovery flights took place; on the 10th dive, the aircraft's pullout at 8,000 ft (2,400 m) registered 14 g on the test equipment. The aircraft broke up in midair, crashing in a cemetery and killing the pilot. A second, strengthened prototype was built, but it crashed on 9 May of the same year following the pilot's bailout during an unsuccessful spin recovery. The second prototype was rebuilt in three weeks, flying on 20 June 1935. An order for 54 F3F-1 fighters was placed on 24 August of that year, following the conclusion of the flight test program.

== Operational history ==
The first production F3F-1 was delivered on 29 January 1936 to the test group at Naval Air Station Anacostia, with squadron service beginning in March to VF-5B of Ranger and VF-6B of Saratoga. Marine squadron VF-4M received the last six in January 1937.

Grumman, wanting to take advantage of the new 950 hp (708 kW) Wright R-1820 supercharged radial engine, began work on the F3F-2 without a contract. The order for 81 was placed until 25 July 1936, two days before the type's first flight. The larger diameter engine changed the cowling's appearance, making the aircraft look even more like a barrel, though top speed increased to 255 mph (410 km/h) at 12,000 ft (3,700 m).

The entire F3F-2 production series was delivered in between 1937 and 1938. When deliveries ended, all seven Navy and Marine Corps pursuit squadrons were equipped with Grumman single-seat fighters. Further aerodynamic improvements were made to an F3F-2 based on wind tunnel studies in the NACA Langley 30 ft × 60 ft (9 m × 18 m) full-scale wind tunnel and became the XF3F-3. It featured a larger-diameter propeller, and a complete revision of the fuselage skinning from the aft cabane strut forward to improve aerodynamics and reduce carbon monoxide intrusion. On 21 June 1938, the Navy ordered 27 F3F-3s, as new monoplane fighters like the Brewster F2A and Grumman's F4F Wildcat were taking longer to develop than planned.

All F3Fs were withdrawn from squadron service by the end of 1941 following the introduction of the Brewster, though 117 were assigned to naval bases (Mainly NAS Miami and NAS Corpus Christi) for training and utility duties until December 1943.

A civilian aerobatic variant, the G-22A "Gulfhawk II," was built in 1936 and flown by Major Alford "Al" Williams, of Gulf Oil.

=== Incidents ===
- 30 October 1936, the pilot was killed when both left wings of an F3F-1 tore off at 1,500 ft (460 m) during dive bombing practice at Border Field, San Diego.
- 10 November 1936, pilot killed when an F3F-1 crashed into Ranger on approach. It sank in 4,600 ft (1,400 m) of water.
- 25 August 1937, a F3F-1 crashed after colliding midair with a Navy Vought SBU-1 above Rancho Santa Fe near San Diego. The pilot bailed out safely.

== Variants ==
Data from: Aerofiles - Grumman

G-11
Company designation for F3F-1 carrier-borne fighters
XF3F-1
Three prototypes of the F3F (all with Bureau Number 9727), powered by a 700 hp (520 kW) Pratt & Whitney R-1535-84 Twin Wasp Juniors
F3F-1
Initial production version for the US Navy, 54 built.
G-19
Company designation for the F3F-2 and F3F-3
XF3F-2
One prototype, powered by a 850 hp (630 kW) Wright XR-1820-22 Cyclone G

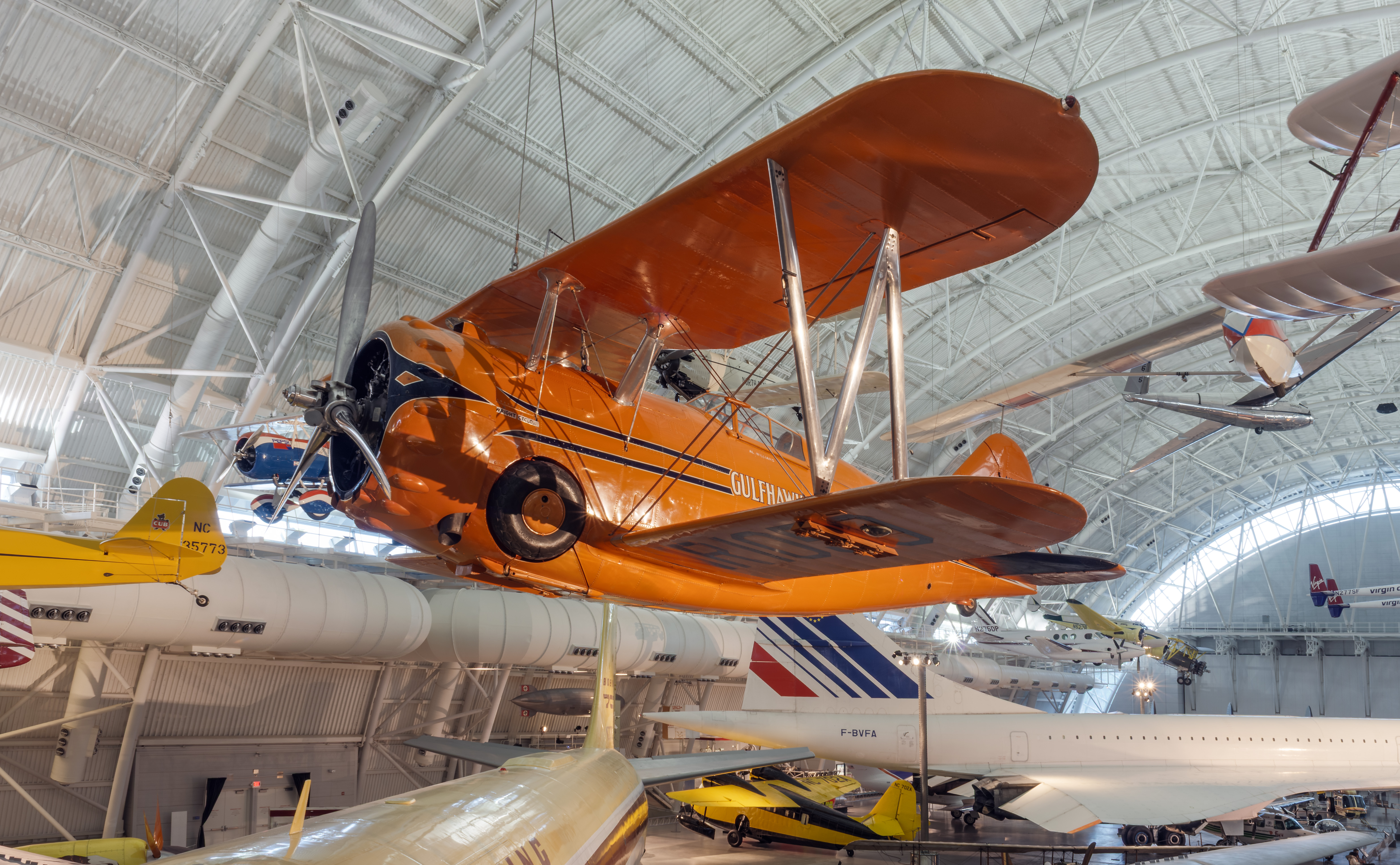
The Grumman G-22 Gulfhawk II at the Steven F. Udvar-Hazy Center of the National Air and Space Museum.

F3F-2
Second production model, powered by a 950 hp (710 kW) Wright R-1820-22 Cyclone, 81 built.
XF3F-3
One prototype F3F-3 with curved windshield, modified forward fuselage with a widened diameter cowling with a single cowl flap on either side
F3F-3
Final production variant for the US Navy, 27 built. Featured a redesigned forward fuselage.
G-22 Gulfhawk II
A single hybrid F2F/F3F, powered by a 1,000 hp (750 kW) Wright R-1820 Cyclone, for display pilot Al Williams, sponsored by the Gulf Oil Company for demonstration flights and aerobatic displays. The G-22 Gulfhawk II was retired to the National Air Museum in October 1948.

== Operators ==
United States

- United States Marine Corps
  - VF-4M
  - VMF-1
  - VMF-2
  - VMF-211
  - VMJ-1
- United States Navy
  - VF-2B
  - VF-3B
  - VF-5B
  - VF-6B
  - VF-2
  - VF-3
  - VF-4
  - VF-5
  - VF-6
  - VF-71
  - VF-72

== Surviving aircraft ==
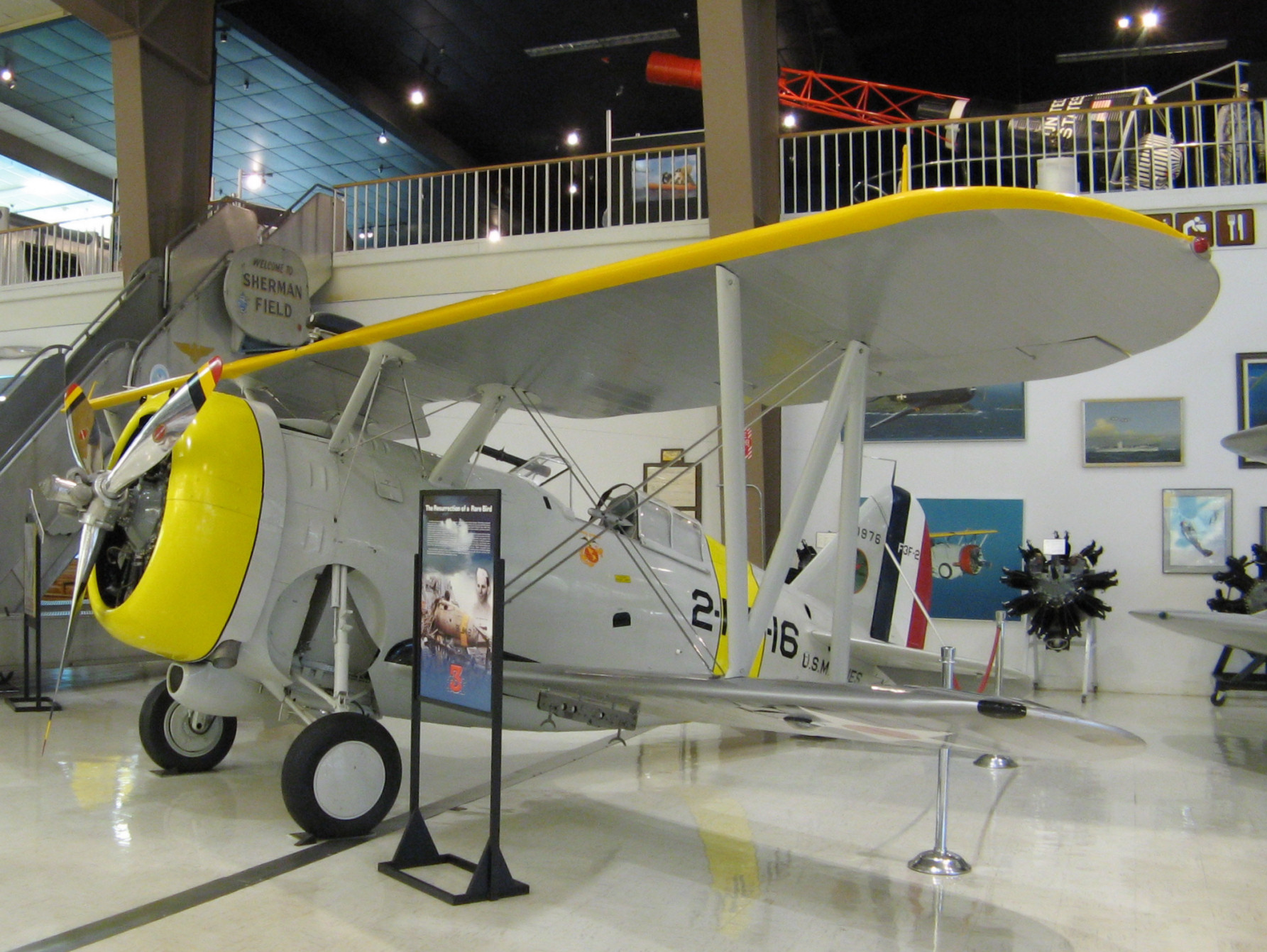
Grumman F3F-2 at the National Naval Aviation Museum, Pensacola, Florida (2007)

Today, there are three flying F3F-2 models, all which were restored by Herb Tischler's Texas Airplane Factory in Fort Worth. The wreckage of three F3F-2 aircraft which had originally crashed in Hawaii was used to complete the other restorations.

- 0972 – F3F-2 owned by Hawks Zeroq3 in Sonoma, California. This airframe was restored by Chris Prevost and was on the flight line at Vintage Aircraft in Sonoma, California. It has since been sold to Lewis Air Legends in Texas.
- 0976 – F3F-2 on static display at the National Naval Aviation Museum in Pensacola, Florida. This aircraft was ditched off the coast of San Diego by Marine aviator Robert E. Galer on 29 August 1940 while landing on Saratoga. The fighter was rediscovered by a U.S. Navy submarine in June 1988, and recovered on 5 April 1991. It was restored at the San Diego Aerospace Museum before going on display at the National Naval Aviation Museum.
- 1028 – F3F-2 on display at the Fantasy of Flight in Polk City, Florida.
- 1033 – F3F-2 owned by the National Museum of World War II Aviation in Colorado Springs, Colorado.
- 335 – G-22 on static display at the Steven F. Udvar-Hazy Center of the National Air and Space Museum in Chantilly, Virginia.

== Specifications (F3F-2) ==
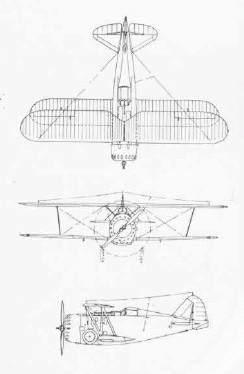
Three-side drawing of an F3F-1

Data from Great Aircraft of the World

General characteristics

- Crew: one pilot
- Length: 23 ft 2 in (7.06 m)
- Wingspan: 32 ft 0 in (9.75 m)
- Height: 9 ft 4 in (2.84 m)
- Wing area: 260 sq ft (24 m^{2})
- Empty weight: 3,285 lb (1,490 kg)
- Max takeoff weight: 4,795 lb (2,175 kg)
- Powerplant: 1 × Wright R-1820-22 "Cyclone" 9-cylinder radial engine, 950 hp (710 kW)

Performance

- Maximum speed: 264 mph (425 km/h, 229 kn) at 15,250 ft (4,650 m)
- Cruise speed: 150 mph (240 km/h, 130 kn)
- Range: 980 mi (1,580 km, 850 nmi)
- Service ceiling: 33,200 ft (10,100 m)
- Rate of climb: 2,800 ft/min (14 m/s) at sea level

Armament

- Guns:
  - 1 × 0.30 in (7.62 mm) M1919 machine gun
  - 1 × 0.50 in (12.7 mm) M2 machine gun
- Bombs: 2 × 116 lb (53 kg) bombs, one under each wing

== See also ==
- F3F in fiction

Related development

- Grumman F2F
- Grumman F4F Wildcat

Aircraft of comparable role, configuration, and era

- Berliner-Joyce XF3J
- Curtiss BF2C Goshawk
- Curtiss F11C Goshawk
- Fiat CR.42 Falco
- Gloster Gladiator
- Nakajima A4N
- Polikarpov I-153

Related lists

- List of fighter aircraft
- List of United States Navy aircraft designations (pre-1962)
