= VF-6 =

Fighting Squadron 6
- Active: 23 September 1921 - 29 October 1945
- Country: United States
- Branch: United States Navy
- Type: Fighter
- Engagements: World War II

Aircraft flown
- Fighter: Vought VE-7; F6C Hawk; Vought FU; Boeing F2B; Boeing F3B; Grumman F2F

Fighting Squadron 6 or VF-6 was an aviation unit of the United States Navy. Originally established as Combat Squadron 4 on 23 September 1921, it was redesignated VF-2 on 1 July 1922, redesignated VF-2B on 19 March 1923, redesignated VF-6B on 1 January 1927, redesignated VF-6 on 1 July 1927, redesignated VB-2B on 1 July 1928, redesignated VF-6B on 1 July 1930, redesignated VF-3 on 1 July 1937, redesignated VF-6 on 15 July 1943 and disestablished on 29 October 1945.

== Operational history ==
=== 1920s ===
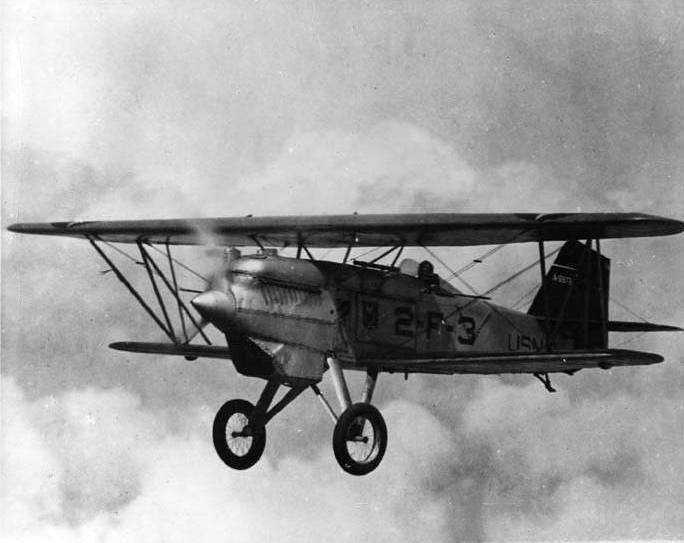
VF-2 F6C-1 in flight

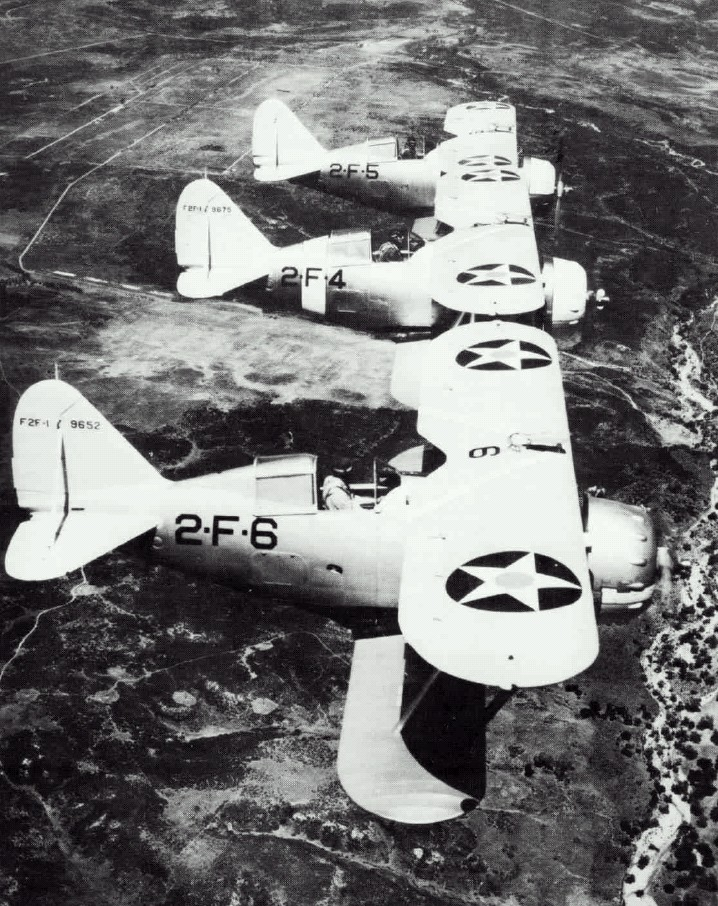
F2F-1's while attached to USS Lexington

Combat Squadron Four was established on 23 September 1921, at Naval Air Station San Diego, California. VF-2 equipped with the Vought VE-7 biplane operated from USS Langley, the US Navy's first aircraft carrier. Between 1922 and 1925, VF-2/VF-2B experimented with carrier operations from the Langley off the coast of California. Air activity was initially limited to scouting, but the Commander-in-Chief, US Fleet saw the potential of naval aviation and recommended that USS Lexington and USS Saratoga be completed as soon as possible.

In 1926, VF-2B flying Curtiss F6C Hawks was the 1st squadron to demonstrate the concept of dive-bombing, carrying out mock attacks on Pacific Fleet ships. Commanders of the surface ships, expecting standard, low-altitude, level bombing, were surprised when the VF-2B aircraft attacked unseen from 12,000 feet, making simulated drops before the ship's defenses could be manned.

In 1927, VF-6 flew FU-1s and was tasked to provide one aircraft to each fleet battleship, with the remaining planes shore-based at NAS North Island. The squadron's FU-1s were launched from ship catapults, landed as seaplanes and then hoisted back aboard by crane.

In 1928, the squadron transferred to Langley and was redesignated VB-2B. Over the course of the next 15 years, the squadron was variously called VF-6B, VF-3, and VF-6 based on their ship assignment ("B" appended meant the squadron was attached to the Battle Fleet, while "S" indicated that it belonged to the Scouting Fleet. In 1937, the last letter of Navy squadron designations was removed.)

=== 1930s ===
VF-6B made two Langley deployments in 1930 and 1931 flying Boeing F2Bs. They later transitioned to Boeing F3B high altitude fighters. In December 1937, the squadron began a transition to the F3F-2. In 1939 the squadron operated at least two F3F-3s Grumman F3F alongside their F3F-2s. .

=== World War II ===
VF-3 served aboard USS Saratoga, USS Lexington, and USS Yorktown until the Battle of Midway. The commanding officer of the squadron during 1942 was then - Lieutenant Commander John Thach. VF-3 and VF-6 swapped designations on 15 July 1943, resulting in a three-year controversy as to which squadron owned the Felix the Cat name and emblem until VF-3 was re-designated VF-3A on 15 November 1946 and awarded the official approval to adopt Felix the Cat by the Chief of Naval Operations.

== Notable former members ==
- Edward "Butch" O'Hare
- John Thach
- Alexander Vraciu

== See also ==
- History of the United States Navy
- List of inactive United States Navy aircraft squadrons
- List of United States Navy aircraft squadrons
