= Frederick E. Bakutis =

United States Navy officer (1912–2009)

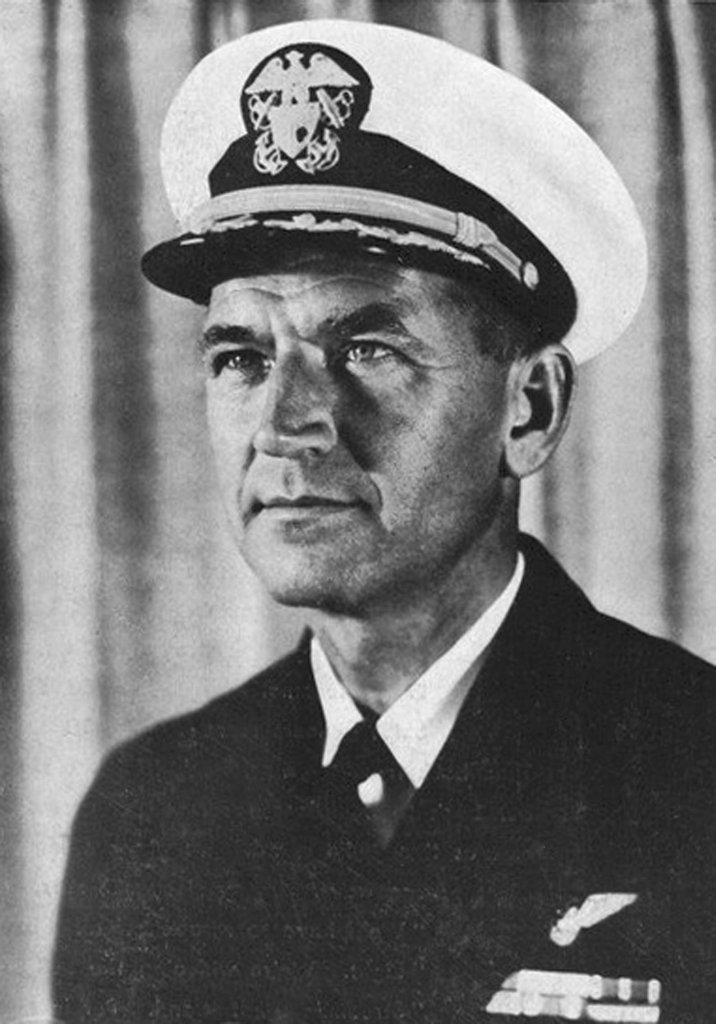
- Born: November 4, 1912; Brockton, Massachusetts, U.S.
- Died: October 4, 2009 (aged 96); Wai'anae, Hawaii, U.S.
- Military career
- Branch: United States Navy
- Service years: 1935–1969
- Rank: Rear Admiral
- Nicknames: "Fred", "Bunky", "Bak"
- Units: Fighting Squadron 16; Fighting Squadron 20; USS Valley Forge (CV-45)
- Commands: Fighting Squadron 20; Carrier Air Group Five; Carrier Air Group One; USS Gardiners Bay (AVP-39); USS Hancock (CVA-19); Alaskan Sea Frontier; Naval Coastal Warfare Group One; Commander Fleet Air, Alaska; Commander Naval Air Bases, Seventeenth Naval District; Anti-Submarine Warfare Group One; Naval Support Force Antarctica; Fleet Air, Alameda; Fleet Air, Hawaii; Fourteenth Naval District; Hawaiian Sea Frontier
- Conflicts: World War II; Korean War
- Awards: Navy Cross; Legion of Merit; Distinguished Flying Cross (2); Bronze Star Medal (2); Air Medal (7); NASA Exceptional Service Medal

Frederick Edward Bakutis (November 4, 1912 – October 4, 2009) was a United States Navy rear admiral and naval aviator. A graduate of the United States Naval Academy, Bakutis was a flying ace during World War II. Post-war, he commanded carrier air groups, and held key leadership roles, including the United States Naval Support Force in Antarctica, before retiring in 1969.

== Early life and education ==
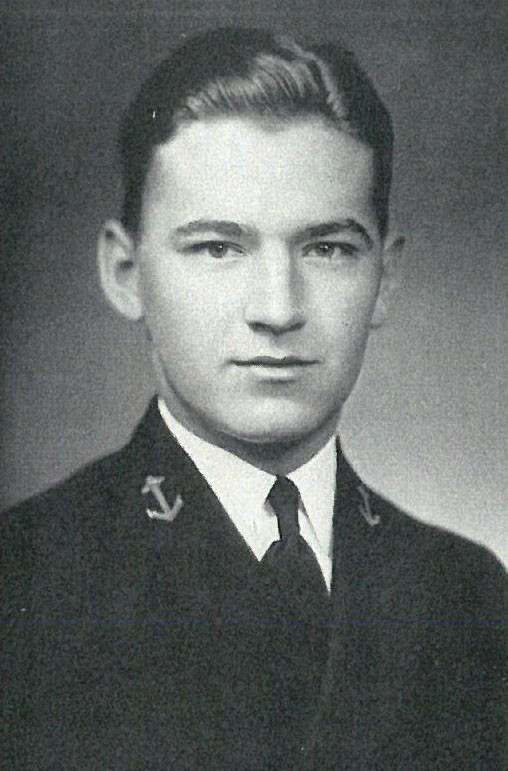
Bakutis as a midshipman in the United States Naval Academy (1930s)

Bakutis was born on November 4, 1912, in Brockton, Massachusetts, to Lithuanian immigrants Frank and Anna Bakutis. He attended Brockton public schools and graduated from high school in 1930. He was appointed to the United States Naval Academy in Annapolis, Maryland, entering as a midshipman on June 16, 1931. During his time at the academy, he was active in athletics and extracurricular activities. He captained the track team in 1935, participated as a team member for three years, and played in the academy's Ten dance orchestra for two years. He graduated on June 6, 1935, and was commissioned as an ensign in the United States Navy.

== Naval career ==
After graduation, Bakutis served as a junior officer and later division officer aboard the heavy cruiser USS Chester until January 1938. He then trained at Naval Air Station Pensacola, earning his naval aviator designation on January 10, 1939. He joined Scouting Squadron 3 (VS-3) on Saratoga (CV-3) in April 1939. In September 1941, he returned to Annapolis for aeronautical engineering instruction at the Naval Postgraduate School but was reassigned to the Naval Aircraft Factory in Philadelphia as an inspector of arresting gear and catapults from March to September 1942 following the outbreak of World War II.

=== World War II ===
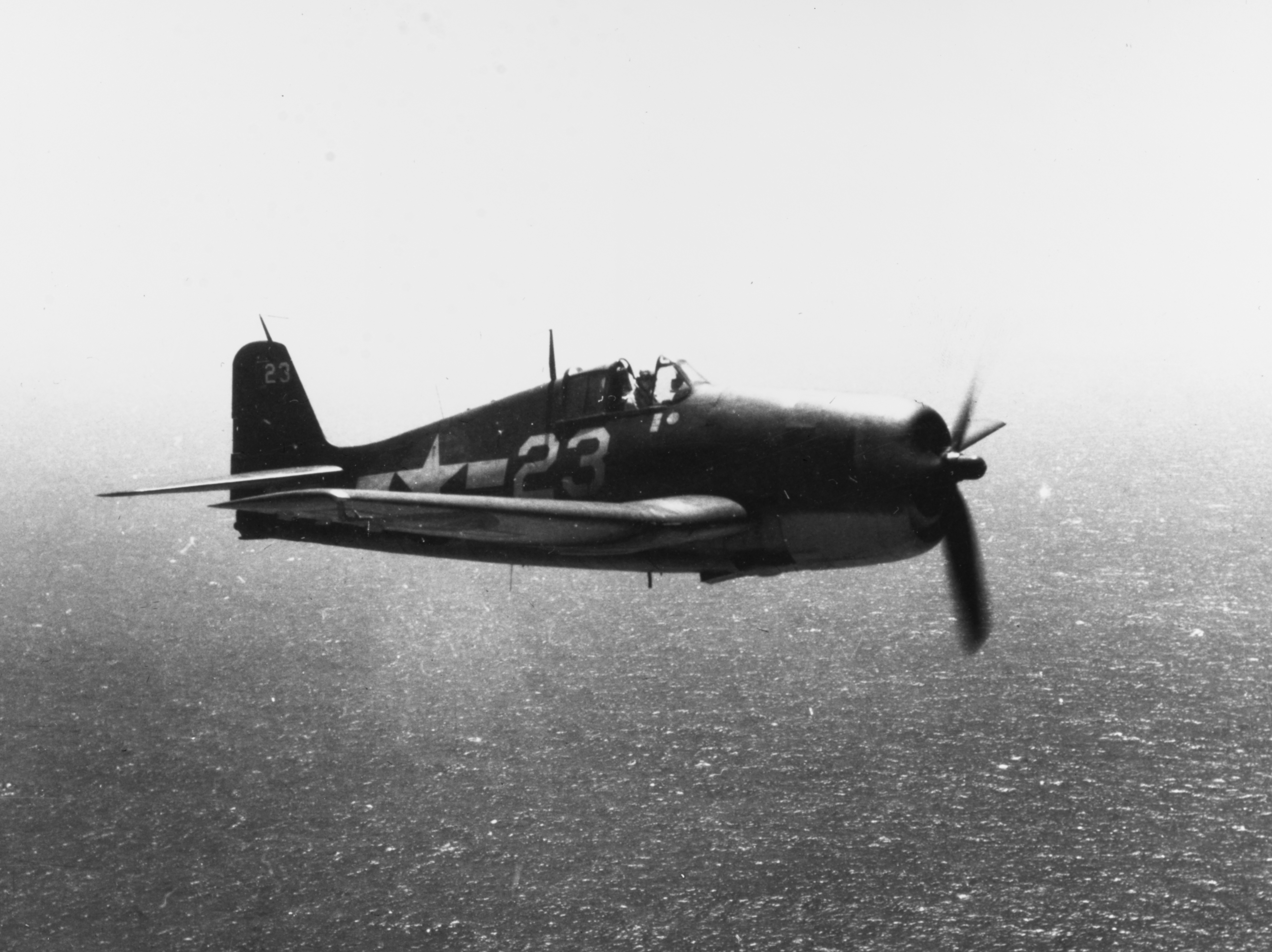
USN F6F in flight (c. 1944)

In October 1942, Bakutis joined Fighting Squadron 16 (VF-16) on USS Lexington (CV-16) as executive officer, flying F6F Hellcats. He assumed command of Fighting Squadron 20 (VF-20) on USS Enterprise (CV-6) in October 1943, leading the squadron until February 1945. His squadron, part of Enterprise's air groups, received the Navy Presidential Unit Citation for combat operations in the Pacific. Bakutis participated in strikes on Bonis, Yap, Palau, the Philippines, Formosa, and Okinawa. On October 26, 1944, during the Battle of Leyte Gulf, Bakutis led a small search group to locate an enemy task force, successfully reported their position, and launched a daring attack on Japanese ships. Braving intense anti-aircraft gunfire, he scored direct rocket hits on a battleship, though the damage was minimal, and contributed to minimally damaging a cruiser and two other battleships. He was then struck by anti-aircraft fire from a Japanese destroyer in the Sulu Sea and survived seven days adrift. He was rescued by the submarine USS Hardhead (SS-365) and then transferred to USS Angler (SS-240), before taken to Perth, Australia for recovery. For his exploits in the mission, he was awarded the Navy Cross. He rejoined his squadron onboard Lexington in December 1944.

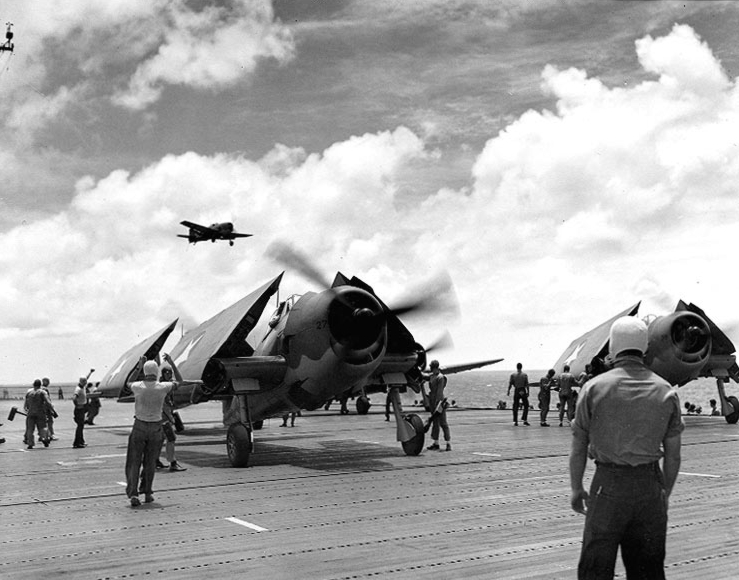
USN F6Fs onboard USS Enterprise (CV-6) (circa. 1943)

As a flying ace, he was credited with destroying seven and half Japanese aircraft, and caused significant damage to enemy shipping, aircraft on ground and installations. From February 1945 until the war's end, Bakutis served with the Department of the Navy in Washington, D.C., attached to the Office of the Chief of Naval Operations (VF Military Requirements Desk) and the Bureau of Aeronautics.

=== Post war ===
From June 1947 to June 1948, Bakutis served as group commander of Carrier Air Group One on USS Tarawa (CV-40). He commanded Carrier Air Group Five on USS Valley Forge (CV-45) from June 1948 to February 1949. He then served as training officer on the staff of Commander Fleet Air, West Coast, and Commander Air Force, Pacific, until June 1949. Bakutis attended the Naval War College in Newport, Rhode Island, as a student from 1949 to 1950 and served on its staff from 1950 to 1952. During the Korean War, he served as an executive officer of Valley Forge from June 1952 to June 1953 and participated in combat operations.

From June 1953 to June 1955, Bakutis was air training and readiness officer on the staff of Commander Air Force, Pacific. He then served in the Office of the Deputy Chief of Naval Operations (Air) for aircraft programs until August 1956. He commanded USS Gardiners Bay (AVP-39) from 1956 to 1957, followed by staff service with the Commander in Chief, U.S. Pacific Fleet from 1957 to 1959, and command of USS Hancock (CVA-19) from 1959 to 1960. In December 1960, he returned to the Office of the Chief of Naval Operations as assistant director of the Fleet Operations Division.

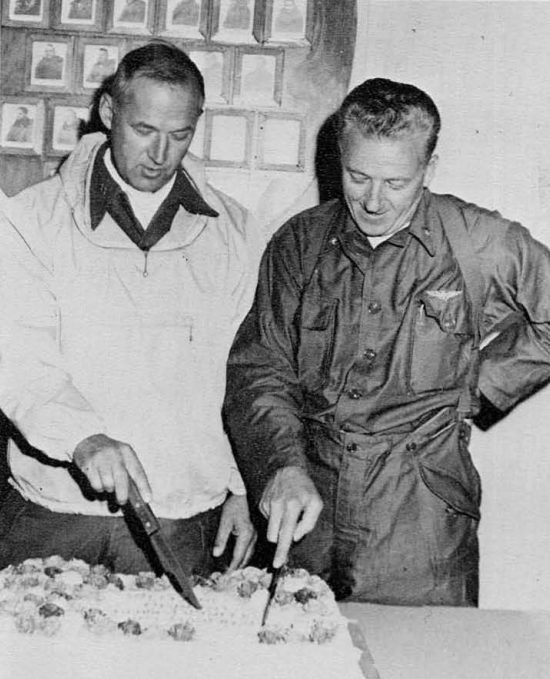
Rear Admiral Bakutis (left), commander of Task Force 43 (Naval Support Force Antarctica), and Captain Henry M. Kosciusko, commander of the Antarctic Support Activities, cut the cake baked in their honor for the opening day of the Deep Freeze 67 season in Antarctica (1967).

Bakutis served as deputy chief of the Joint Alternate Command Element under the Joint Chiefs of Staff at Fort Ritchie in Maryland, from July 1961 to March 1962. He then commanded the Alaskan Sea Frontier and the Seventeenth Naval District in Kodiak, Alaska, from March 1962, with additional duties as Commander Fleet Air, Alaska, and Commander Naval Air Bases, Seventeenth Naval District, from September 1962. He commanded Anti-Submarine Warfare Group One in Long Beach, California, from March 1964 to March 1965, followed by the U.S. Naval Support Force, Antarctica, from April 1965 to April 1967. During his tenure in Antarctica, members of the United States Antarctic Service sighted a coastal region extending from a point opposite eastern Dean Island, which was named Bakutis Coast in his honor. Bakutis remarked in 1965 that Antarctica would "remain the womanless white continent of peace."

He then commanded Fleet Air in Alameda, from April 1967 to March 1968. His final assignment was as Commander of the Hawaiian Sea Frontier, Commandant of the Fourteenth Naval District, and Commander Fleet Air in Hawaii, from March 1968. While serving in these roles, he was actively involved in NASA's Apollo program and was commended personally for his contribution for the successful recovery of the Apollo 10 astronauts in the South Pacific, on May 20, 1969. He also oversaw the opening up Barbers Point in Hawaii to surfers and allowed fishermen to fish in Pearl Harbor. He retired from the Navy in July 1969.

== Later life ==
Bakutis and his wife had a son and two daughters. Following his retirement from the Navy, he resided in Maili, Hawaii. Bakutis died on October 4, 2009, in Wai'anae, at the age of 96. He was cremated and his ashes scattered into the Pacific Ocean from Ulehawa Beach Park in Maili.

== Aerial victory credits ==
| Date | Total | Aircraft types claimed | Location |
|---|---|---|---|
| October 12, 1944 | 2 | Nakajima Ki-44 "Tojo" destroyed | Formosa |
| October 15, 1944 | 2; 1/2 | Nakajima B6N "Jill" destroyed Mitsubishi Ki-46 "Dinah" destroyed | Manila, Philippines |
| October 18, 1944 | 1; 1/2 | Nakajima Ki-44 "Tojo" destroyed Nakajima Ki-43 "Oscar" destroyed | Clark Field, Philippines |
| January 15, 1945 | 1 | Kawanishi N1K "George" destroyed | |
| January 20, 1945 | 1/2 | Nakajima C6N "Myrt" destroyed | |
| | 7 1/2 | | |

== Awards and decorations ==
His awards include:

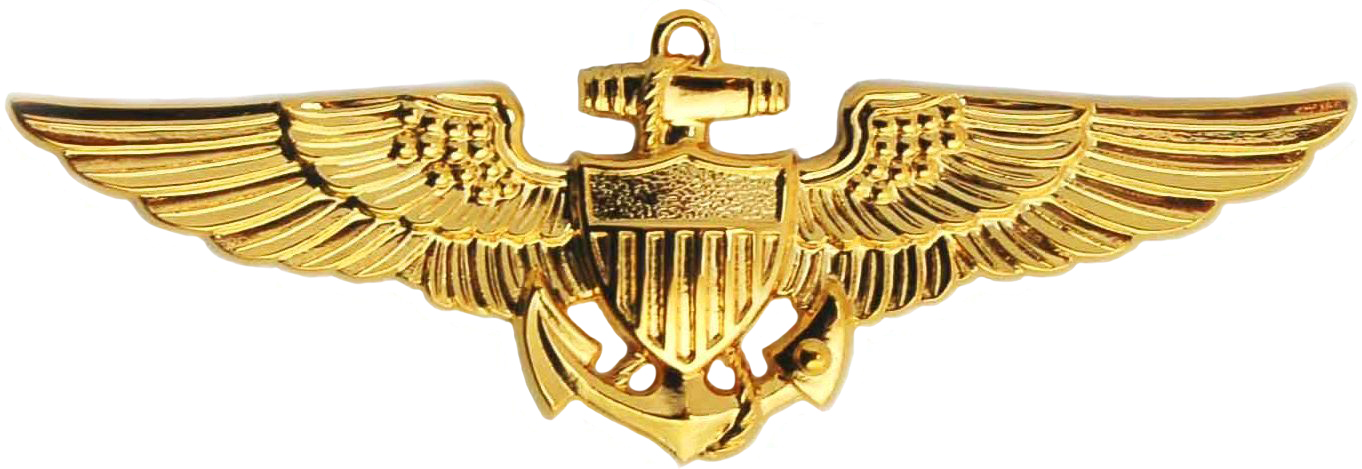

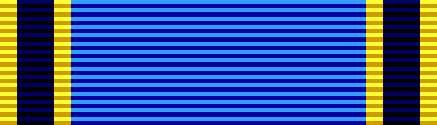

United States Naval Aviator Badge
| Navy Cross | Legion of Merit w/ Combat 'V' | Distinguished Flying Cross w/ 5/16" gold star |
| Bronze Star Medal w/ Combat 'V' and 5/16" gold star | Air Medal w/ 5/16" silver and gold stars | Combat Action Ribbon w/ 5/16" gold star |
| Navy Commendation Medal | Navy Presidential Unit Citation | Navy Unit Commendation |
| NASA Exceptional Service Medal | American Defense Service Medal | American Campaign Medal |
| Asiatic-Pacific Campaign Medal w/ three 3/16" bronze stars | World War II Victory Medal | National Defense Service Medal w/ 3/16" bronze star |
| Korean Service Medal | Antarctica Service Medal w/ Gold Clasp and disc | Armed Forces Expeditionary Medal |
| Philippine Liberation Medal w/ two 3/16" bronze stars | United Nations Korea Medal | Republic of Korea War Service Medal (Note: In 2000, this medal was awarded retroactively to all U.S. military personnel who had served in the Korean War.) |

=== Navy Cross citation ===

Commander Frederick Edward Bakutis
U.S. Navy
Date Of Action: October 24, 1944

The President of the United States of America takes pleasure in presenting the Navy Cross to Commander Frederick Edward Bakutis (NSN: 0-75028), United States Navy, for extraordinary heroism in operations against the enemy while serving as Pilot of a carrier-based Navy Fighter Plane and Commanding Officer of Fighting Squadron TWENTY (VF-20), attached to the USS ENTERPRISE (CV-6), in action against enemy Japanese forces in Philippine waters during the Battle of Leyte Gulf on 24 October 1944. Aggressively leading a small search group on a strike against an enemy task force, Commander Bakutis succeeded in locating the concentration of hostile vessels and immediately reported the location to his base. Then, launching a brilliant attack on the Japanese ships, he fought his plane gallantly in the face of a withering barrage of accurate antiaircraft fire and gunfire from the enemy's main batteries, personally scoring direct hits with his rockets on a battleship and contributing in large measure to the damaging of one cruiser and two other battleships during this fierce action. By his forceful leadership and outstanding tactical ability, Commander Bakutis was in large measure responsible for the neutralization of Japanese surface forces in this strategic area and his unwavering devotion to duty was in keeping with the highest traditions of the United States Naval Service.

== In popular culture ==
Bakutis' exploits in the Battle of Leyte Gulf are part of the American documentary series Battle 360° on the episode "Battle of Leyte Gulf".
