= VA34 =

VA-34 has the following meanings:

- Attack Squadron 34 (U.S. Navy)
- State Route 34 (Virginia)
