= Alexander Vraciu =

US Navy fighter pilot

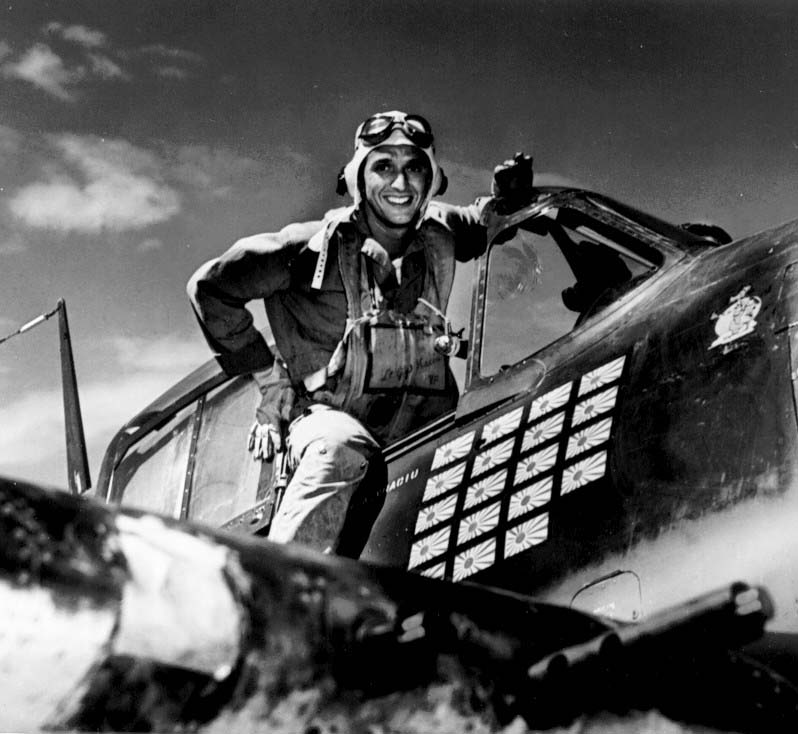
- Vraciu after the Battle of the Philippine Sea, June 20, 1944
- Born: November 2, 1918; East Chicago, Indiana, U.S.
- Died: January 29, 2015 (aged 96); West Sacramento, California, U.S.
- Burial place: Oakmont Memorial Park, Lafayette, California
- Spouse: Kathryn Horn
- Military career
- Allegiance: United States
- Branch: United States Navy
- Service years: 1941–1964
- Rank: Commander
- Units: VF-3/6; VF-16; VF-20; VF-51
- Conflicts: World War II; Wake Island Raid; Battle of Kwajalein; Operation Hailstone; Battle of the Philippine Sea
- Awards: Navy Cross; Distinguished Flying Cross (3); Air Medal (4); United States Navy High Individual – Aerial Gunnery – 1957

Alexander Vraciu (/vʌˈræʃjuː/ vuh-RASH-yoo; November 2, 1918 – January 29, 2015) was a United States Navy fighter ace, Navy Cross recipient, and Medal of Honor nominee during World War II. At the end of the war, Vraciu ranked fourth among the U.S. Navy's flying aces, with 19 enemy planes downed during flight and 21 destroyed on the ground. After the war, he served as a test pilot and was instrumental in forming the post-war Naval and Marine Air Reserve program. From 1956 to 1958 Vraciu led his own fighter squadron, VF-51, for twenty-two months. He retired from the U.S. Navy with the rank of commander on December 31, 1963. Vraciu later moved to Danville, California, and worked for Wells Fargo.

Vraciu was born in East Chicago, Indiana, of Romanian immigrant parents. He graduated from DePauw University in Greencastle, Indiana, and began his military career in 1941, when he enlisted in the U.S. Navy. During his military service in World War II, Vraciu flew Grumman F6F Hellcats in the Pacific, spending five months as a wingman to his mentor, Edward "Butch" O'Hare, the navy's first ace of the war. Vraciu's greatest success took place on June 19, 1944, during what became known as the "Great Marianas Turkey Shoot," when he engaged a Japanese bomber formation in air-to-air combat, downing six Japanese aircraft in eight minutes using only 360 rounds of ammunition. In December 1944 Vraciu was shot down during a mission over the Philippines, he parachuted and spent five weeks with Filipino resistance fighters before rejoining American military forces and returning to USS Lexington. Vraciu spent the last few months of the war serving at the Naval Air Test Center in Patuxent, Maryland.

== Early life, education and family ==
Vraciu at DePauw University

Vraciu was born in East Chicago, Indiana, on November 2, 1918, the second child and only son of Alexandru Sr. and Maria (née Tincu) Vraciu. Vraciu's parents immigrated from Transylvania, Romania at the turn of the century; Alexandru Sr. was born in Poiana Sibiului, while his mother was from Sebeș. Both settled in East Chicago, where they met and were married. When Alex was seven or eight years old, the family traveled to Transylvania for a brief residence, his parents hoping that the experience would immerse their children in the culture. Afterward, the family returned to Indiana, where Vraciu resumed his education, graduating from East Chicago's Washington High School in 1937.

Vraciu earned a four-year scholarship to DePauw University in Greencastle, Indiana, and graduated with a degree in sociology in 1941. At DePauw, Vraciu was active on the school's football, tennis, and track teams, and became a member of the Delta Chi fraternity. He joined the DePauw Tigers football team against his parents' wishes, where he was a backup running back, linebacker, and return specialist during the 1938 season; his football career ended later that year after suffering a knee injury against Evansville. In 1939, he garnered national attention for a prank in his psychology class: during the final exam, he threw an eraser at his professor Paul J. Fay, shouted, "I just can't stand it any longer!", then jumped out the second-story window, where his Delta Chi brothers caught him on a tarp. DePauw's student newspaper referenced the prank in November 1942 after he jumped from his plane following a mid-air collision during Navy flight training, headlining their article as "Vraciu Parachutes from Wrecked Plane; Repeats Procedure of Student Prank".

Vraciu married Kathryn Horn on August 24, 1944. The couple had five children, three daughters and two sons. Kathryn died in 2003.

== Naval career ==
=== Pilot training ===
During the summer between his junior and senior years in college, Vraciu participated in the Civilian Pilot Training Program (CPTP) at Muncie, Indiana, where he received a private pilot's license. On October 9, 1941, he enlisted as a naval aviator in the U.S. Navy Reserve. He reported to Glenview Naval Air Station in suburban Chicago for preliminary training as a pilot, and received additional pilot training at Dallas and Corpus Christi, Texas, in early 1942, and in San Diego, California, in 1943.

Vraciu was designated as a naval aviator and commissioned as a Naval Reserve ensign in August 1942, and promoted at the end of March 1943. While a cadet at NAS Corpus Christi in 1942, Vraciu had heard Lieutenant Commander Edward "Butch" O'Hare, the U.S. Navy's first ace, speak to the cadets. Now he heard that O'Hare was reforming Fighting Squadron 3 (VF-3) in San Diego, and by the flip of a coin, he got orders to report to VF-3. The squadron completed their carrier qualification (CQ) and catapult launches in their new F6F-3 Hellcats on board the escort carrier USS Altamaha by early June when Air Group Six was ordered to Hawaii. On June 14, the squadron boarded escort carrier USS Prince William, arriving at Pearl Harbor on the morning of June 22. By that afternoon, O'Hare had led his first 18 Hellcats to Pu'unene Naval Air Station on Maui. O'Hare chose Vraciu as his wingman and gave him valuable advice regarding air combat tactics. On July 15, all Air Group Six squadrons were renumbered with the number 6.

=== World War II service ===
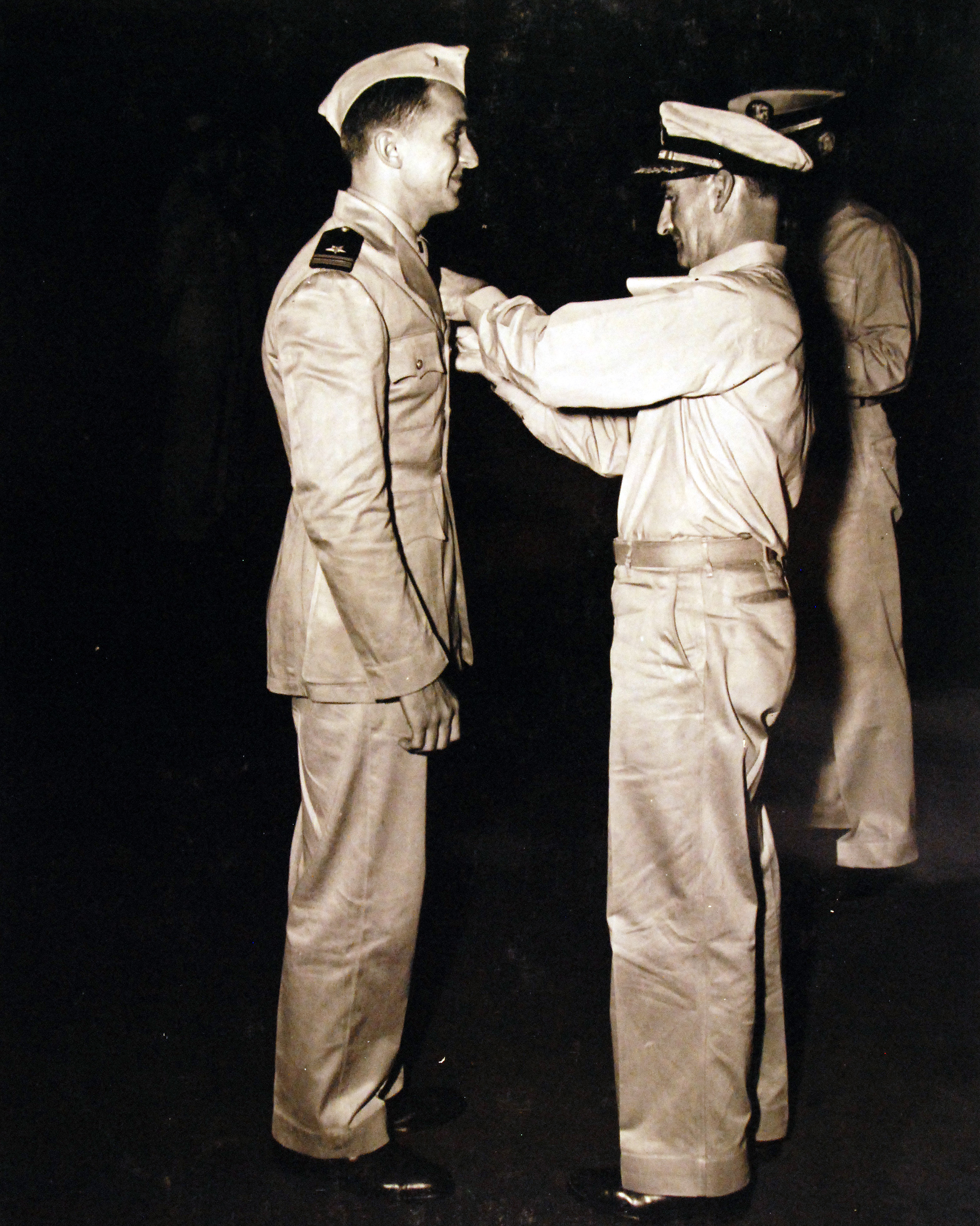
Captain E. W. Litch presenting Lieutenant Junior Grade Alexander Vraciu with the Distinguished Flying Cross on June 5, 1944

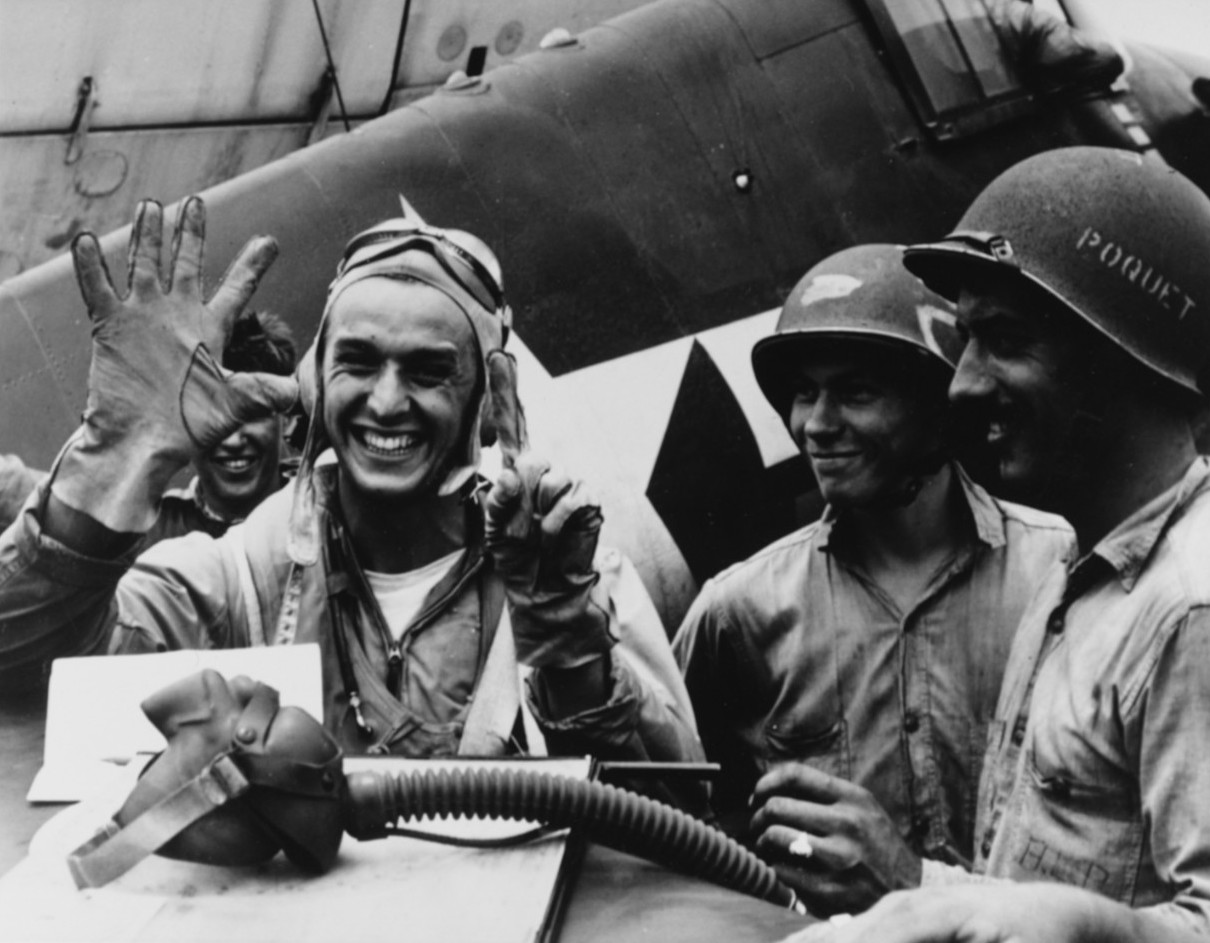
Lt. Alex Vraciu uses his hands to indicate his downing of six aircraft on June 19, 1944. All were Yokosuka D4Y "Judies".

Vraciu's first air-to air combat took place over Wake Island in October 1943, flying from the light aircraft carrier USS Independence. Vraciu scored his first victory on October 5, 1943, when he and O'Hare encountered an enemy formation. O'Hare flew below the clouds to find a Japanese Mitsubishi Zero and Vraciu lost sight of him. Vraciu followed a second Zero to Wake Island, where it landed, and strafed the Zero on the ground. Vraciu also destroyed his first Mitsubishi G4M ("Betty") bomber while it was parked on the runway. During a mission in the Gilbert Islands (Makin and Tarawa atolls) on November 20, 1943, Vraciu downed a Betty bomber. (During his earlier training with O'Hare, Vraciu had learned to use the high side pass maneuver when attacking a Betty to avoid the lethal 20mm cannon wielded by its tail gunner.)

After USS Independence was damaged in fighting with the Japanese, Vraciu's squadron transferred to USS Essex, and by the end of January 1944 the men were aboard USS Intrepid. The ship's nickname of "The Evil I" because of its reputation for bad luck did not affect Vraciu's combat success; he began downing Japanese aircraft in multiples. On January 29, 1944, Vraciu shot down three Betty bombers, bringing his total number of downed enemy planes to five, achieving status as an ace. On February 17 he shot down four Japanese fighters over Truk Atoll. With nine victories, he became and remained VF-6's leading ace of the war. When USS Intrepid returned to Pearl Harbor for repairs in February 1944, Vraciu had an opportunity to rotate back to the United States, but he preferred to stay in the Pacific and requested additional combat duty. He joined VF-16 aboard USS Lexington on February 27, 1944.

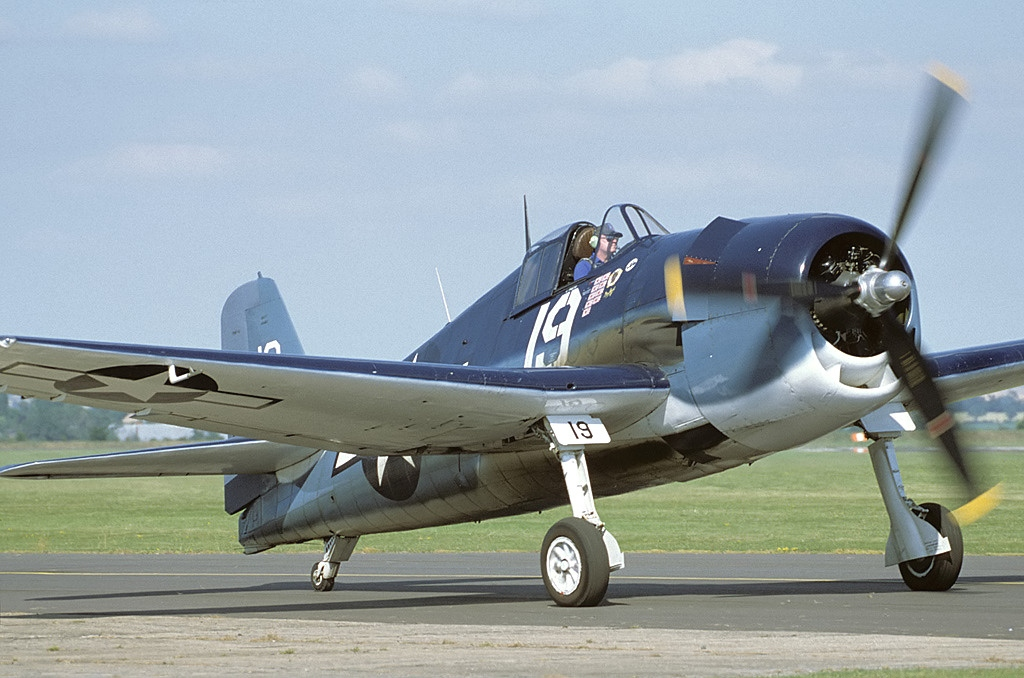
Alex Vraciu's most famous Grumman Hellcat, an F6F-3, survived the war and now flies with The Fighter Collection in the UK. It was restored using parts from multiple aircraft (taking on the serial number of an F6F-5K for convenience according to TFC) and painted in the markings it wore when serving with VF-6.

Date	Type	Total	Citation
10/05/43	1 A6M Zeke	1	
11/20/43	1 Mitsubishi G4M Betty	1	
01/29/44	3 G4M Betty	3	
02/16/44	3 A6M Zeke, 1 Nakajima A6M2-N Rufe	4	
04/29/44	2 A6M Zeke	2	
06/14/44	1 G4M Betty	1	
06/19/44	6 Yokosuka D4Y Judy	6	
06/20/44	1 A6M Zeke	1	
		19	

Vraciu's most successful day as an aviator occurred on June 19, 1944, during the First Battle of the Philippine Sea, also known as the "Great Marianas Turkey Shoot." Despite a malfunctioning supercharger, he intercepted a formation of Japanese dive bombers and destroyed six in a period of eight minutes. After Vraciu landed, the ordnancemen on Lexington discovered that he had used only 360 rounds of ammunition. (On average, each of the six kills followed a burst lasting less than five seconds.) On June 20, 1944, while escorting bombers in an attack on the Japanese Mobile Fleet (Kido Butai), Vraciu downed his nineteenth plane, making him the leading U.S. Navy ace, although he held that title for only four months. Vraciu was nominated for the Medal of Honor for his actions at the First Battle of the Philippine Sea; however, when the nomination reached the desk of Admiral George D. Murray at Pacific Fleet Headquarters in Hawaii, it was downgraded to a Navy Cross. Vraciu returned to the United States on leave in August 1944, and was promoted to a lieutenant upon his return to San Diego, California. Until he received orders for a new combat assignment, Vraciu made public appearances to promote the U.S. Navy in the United States.

Vraciu returned to combat in the Pacific in late 1944, flying Grumman F6F Hellcats in VF-20. On December 14, 1944, after two missions with VF-20, his plane was downed by anti-aircraft fire during a mission over the Philippines. Vraciu parachuted from his plane, landing in the Tarlac province of Luzon. He was rescued by Filipino resistance fighters, who appointed him a brevet major in command of a guerrilla unit. After spending five weeks with the guerrilla fighters, Vraciu rejoined American military forces and returned to USS Lexington. He spent the last few months of the war serving at the Naval Air Test Center in Patuxent, Maryland. Vraciu ended the war as the U.S. Navy's fourth highest ranking ace, credited with downing a total of nineteen enemy aircraft and destroying twenty-one on the ground.

=== Post war service ===
Following World War II, Vraciu was promoted to lieutenant commander and spent six years as a test pilot. He was instrumental in forming the post-war Naval and Marine Air Reserve program.

After staff assignments with the U.S. Navy in Washington, D.C., Vraciu became a jet training officer at Los Alamitos Naval Air Station in Orange County, California, and attended the Naval Post-Graduate School at Monterey, California. Promoted to commander, Vraciu led his own fighter squadron, VF-51, for twenty-two months, from 1956 to 1958, and won the individual gunnery championship at the U.S. Navy's Air Weapons Meet at El Centro, California, in 1957. Vraciu officially retired from the U. S. Navy on December 31, 1963, while serving as the public information officer at the Alameda Naval Air Station in Alameda, California.

== Later years ==
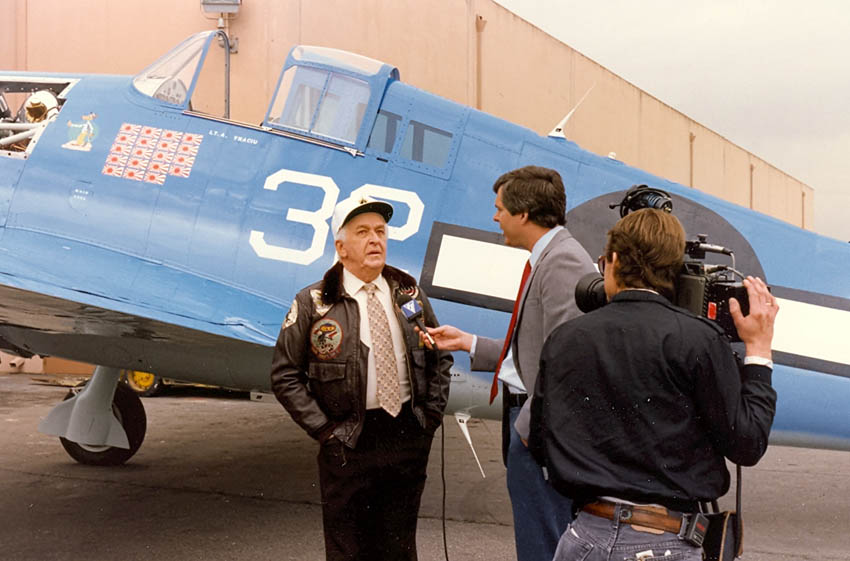
Alexander Vraciu being interviewed, Hayward, California, 1989

After retiring from the U.S. Navy, Vraciu moved to Danville, California, where he worked for Wells Fargo bank. In retirement he continued to give public lectures to schools, businesses, and civic groups.

Vraciu appeared in "The Zero Killer" (2006), during season one, episode six, of the History Channel's Dogfights series.

In his later years, Vraciu declined invitations to write an autobiography; however, he agreed to be interviewed and participated in oral history projects at the Indiana Historical Society and the University of North Texas, which eventually resulted in the publication of his biography, Fighter Pilot: The World War II Career of Alex Vraciu (Indianapolis: Indiana Historical Society Press, 2010).

== Death and legacy ==
Vraciu died on January 29, 2015, in West Sacramento, California, at the age of 96.

Historian Barrett Tillman acknowledged that Vraciu's mild-mannered and easy-going demeanor in his everyday life was atypical of his "steely aggressiveness" in combat. Ray Boomhower, Vraciu's biographer, commented that the fighter pilot and wartime hero was straightforward in their discussions, adding that Vraciu "always gave credit to those who had trained him".

Naval Air Facility El Centro became Vraciu Field in March 2019.

== Naval Awards ==
Vraciu's decorations and awards include:

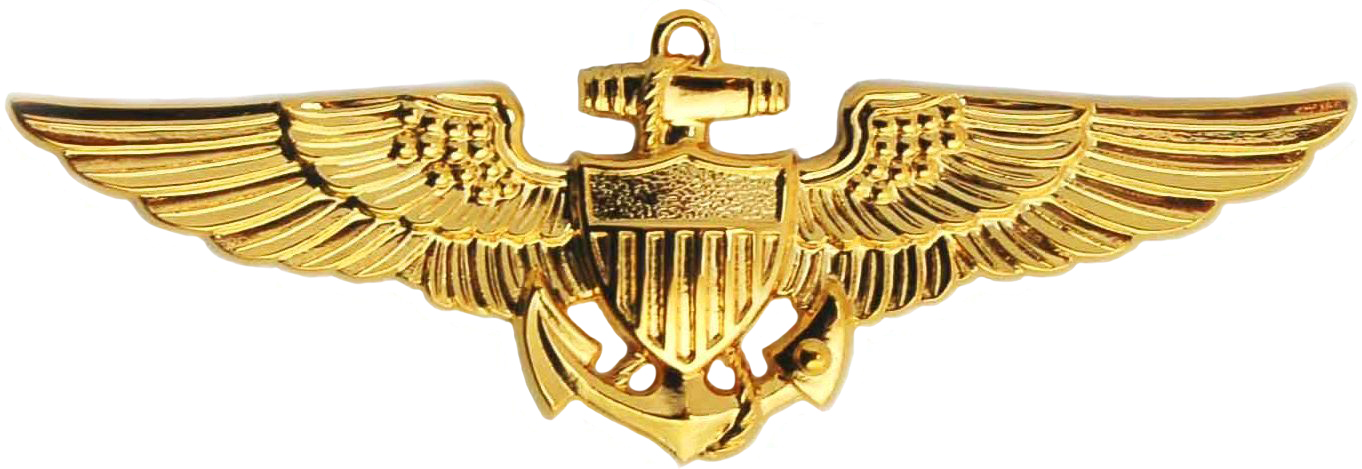

Naval Aviator Badge
Navy Cross		Distinguished Flying Cross w/ two 5/16" Gold Stars
Air Medal w/ three 5/16" Gold Stars	Combat Action Ribbon	Navy Presidential Unit Citation w/ two 3/16" bronze stars
Navy Unit Commendation	China Service Medal	American Defense Service Medal
American Campaign Medal	Asiatic-Pacific Campaign Medal w/ three 3/16" bronze stars	World War II Victory Medal
National Defense Service Medal w/ one 3/16" Bronze Star	Naval Reserve Medal	Philippine Liberation Medal w/ two 3/16" bronze stars

- United States Navy High Individual (Aerial Gunnery), 1957

=== Navy Cross citation ===

Commander [then Lieutenant, Junior Grade] Alexander Vraciu
U.S. Navy
Date Of Action: June 12, 1944

The President of the United States of America takes pleasure in presenting the Navy Cross to Commander [then Lieutenant, Junior Grade] Alexander Vraciu, United States Naval Reserve, for extraordinary heroism in operations against the enemy while serving as Pilot of a carrier-based Navy Fighter Plane in Fighting Squadron SIXTEEN (VF-16), attached to the U.S.S. LEXINGTON (CV-16), during operations in the vicinity of the Marianas Islands. On 12 June 1944 while participating in a daring strike against enemy shipping in a Saipan Harbor, Commander Vraciu dove through intense anti-aircraft fire to sink a large enemy merchant ship by a direct hit on its stern. On 14 June 1944 in the course of a strike against enemy positions in the islands of North of Saipan, Commander Vraciu sighted an enemy search plane. Despite an altitude disadvantage, he approached the plane so skillfully keeping in its "blind spot" that he was able to overhaul it and shoot it down. On 19 June 1944 with his Task Force under attack by a numerically superior force of enemy aircraft, Commander Vraciu struck furiously at the hostile bombers and, in the face of vigorous fighter opposition, succeeded in shooting down six thus contributing to the break-up of a concentrated enemy attack. On 20 June 1944 while flying escort for bomber and Torpedo Planes on a long-range strike against the Japanese Fleet, Commander Vraciu fearlessly closed with a group of hostile fighters, blasting one from the sky and severely damaging another to enable our forces to attack and disable a Japanese carrier. By his devotion to duty, Commander Vraciu reflected great credit upon himself and upheld the highest traditions of the United States Naval Service.
