= VFA-34 =

Strike Fighter Squadron 34
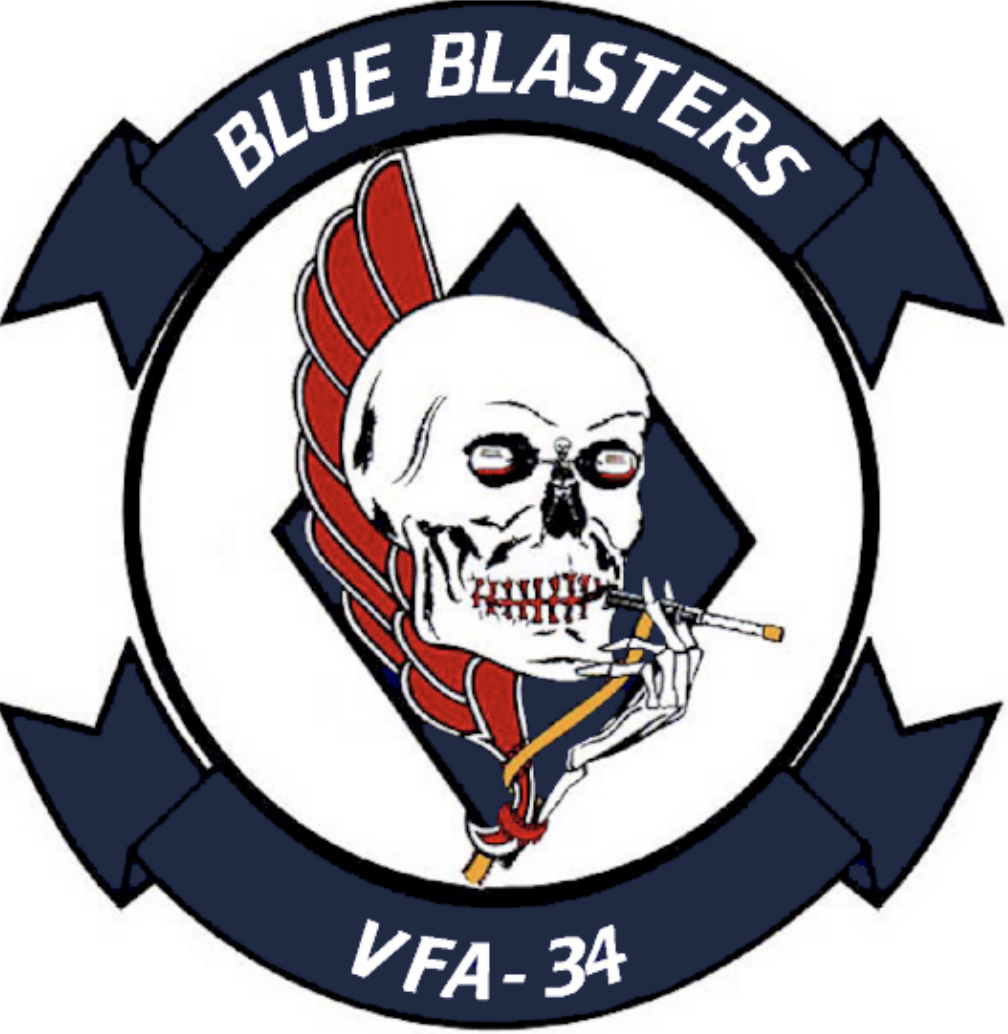
- Active: 1 January 1970 - present
- Country: United States
- Branch: United States Navy
- Type: Fighter/Attack
- Role: Close air support Air interdiction Aerial reconnaissance
- Part of: Carrier Air Wing Three
- Garrison/HQ: NAS Oceana
- Nickname: Blue Blasters
- Motto: "Have gun….Will travel."
- Engagements: World War II; Vietnam War; Operation Prairie Fire; Operation El Dorado Canyon; Gulf War; Operation Deliberate Force; Operation Southern Watch; Operation Enduring Freedom; Iraq War; Operation Prosperity Guardian; Operation Poseidon Archer

Aircraft flown
- Attack: A-6 Intruder
- Fighter: F/A-18C Hornet; F/A-18E Super Hornet

Strike Fighter Squadron 34 (VFA-34), also known as the "Blue Blasters", is a United States Navy F/A-18E Super Hornet strike fighter squadron stationed at Naval Air Station Oceana. They are a part of Carrier Air Wing 3 and are attached to the aircraft carrier USS Dwight D. Eisenhower. Their tail code is AC and their radio call sign is "Joker".

== Squadron insignia and nickname ==
The squadron's first insignia was approved for use by VF-20 during World War II, and was a "Joker" breaking out of a deck of cards carrying a machine gun. This insignia was selected by the squadron because the young and inexperienced pilots in the squadron were referred to as the "Jokers". It was approved by Chief of Naval Operations (CNO) on 15 March 1944. The next insignia adopted by the squadron was the outline of a human skull, approved by CNO on 1 February 1946. Superimposed on the nose of a skull was a human skeleton with the arms holding paddles that became the eyes of the skull, while the teeth were represented by the word "Fighting 20." On 10 June 1949, CNO approved another modification to the squadron insignia which embellished the skull design. This insignia was in use from 1949 until the squadron's disestablishment in 1969. In 1957 the squadron adopted their present nickname, taking inspiration from their blue tail colors and their nuclear weapon delivery capability; hence the name "Blue Blasters." When the third VA-34 was established in 1970, it adopted the insignia and Blue Blasters nickname used by the previous VA-34 squadron (the second VA-34). On 10 May 1999 the CNO approved a modification to the squadron's insignia tailoring the design to the strike fighter community.

== History ==
Three distinct U.S. Navy squadrons have been designated VA-34. The first squadron to hold the VA-34 designation was in 1948, this squadron was redesignated VA-35 in 1950. The second VA-34 was established in 1943 and disestablished in 1969. The third VA-34, established in 1970, was later redesignated VFA-34 and is the subject of this article. Officially, the US Navy does not recognize a direct lineage with disestablished squadrons if a new squadron is formed with the same designation. Nevertheless, new squadrons often assume the nickname, insignia, and traditions of the earlier squadrons.

=== 1970s ===
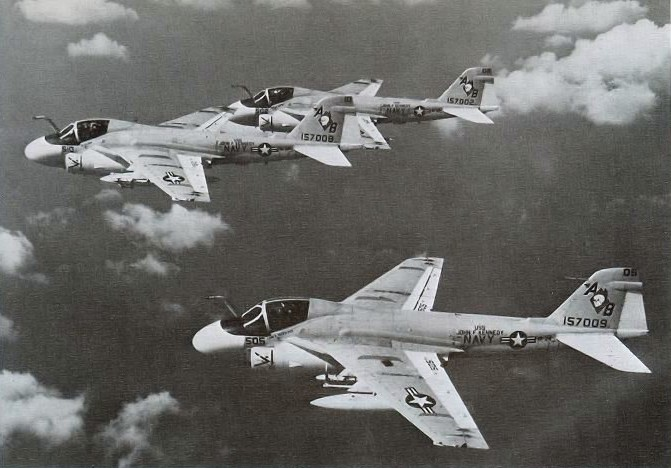
VA-34 A-6As in 1971.

Less than a year after disestablishment of the second VA-34, a new Blue Blaster squadron was established at NAS Oceana, Virginia, on 1 January 1970 as the Atlantic Fleet's sixth A-6E Intruder squadron. The actual establishment ceremony was conducted at NAS Oceana on 17 April 1970.

On 18 September 1970, VA-34 embarked aboard USS John F. Kennedy as part of Carrier Air Wing One for a short at-sea period prior to its scheduled November deployment to the Gulf of Tonkin in the Western Pacific. However, while en route to the Caribbean for an operational readiness inspection, the ship was ordered to deploy to the Mediterranean after Syria invaded Jordan. The squadron returned home in March 1971 from this unscheduled deployment, only one year old, but already in possession of the Meritorious Unit Commendation. In August 1971, VA-34 received the Battle "E" award as the Atlantic Fleet's top A-6 squadron.

In September 1972, a squadron A-6 Intruder conducted crossdeck operations on HMS Ark Royal while operating in the Norwegian Sea. Due to the outbreak of the Yom Kippur War, VA-34 and USS John F. Kennedy departed the Norwegian Sea in October 1973 and re-entered the Mediterranean, conducting surveillance operations south of Crete.

=== 1980s ===
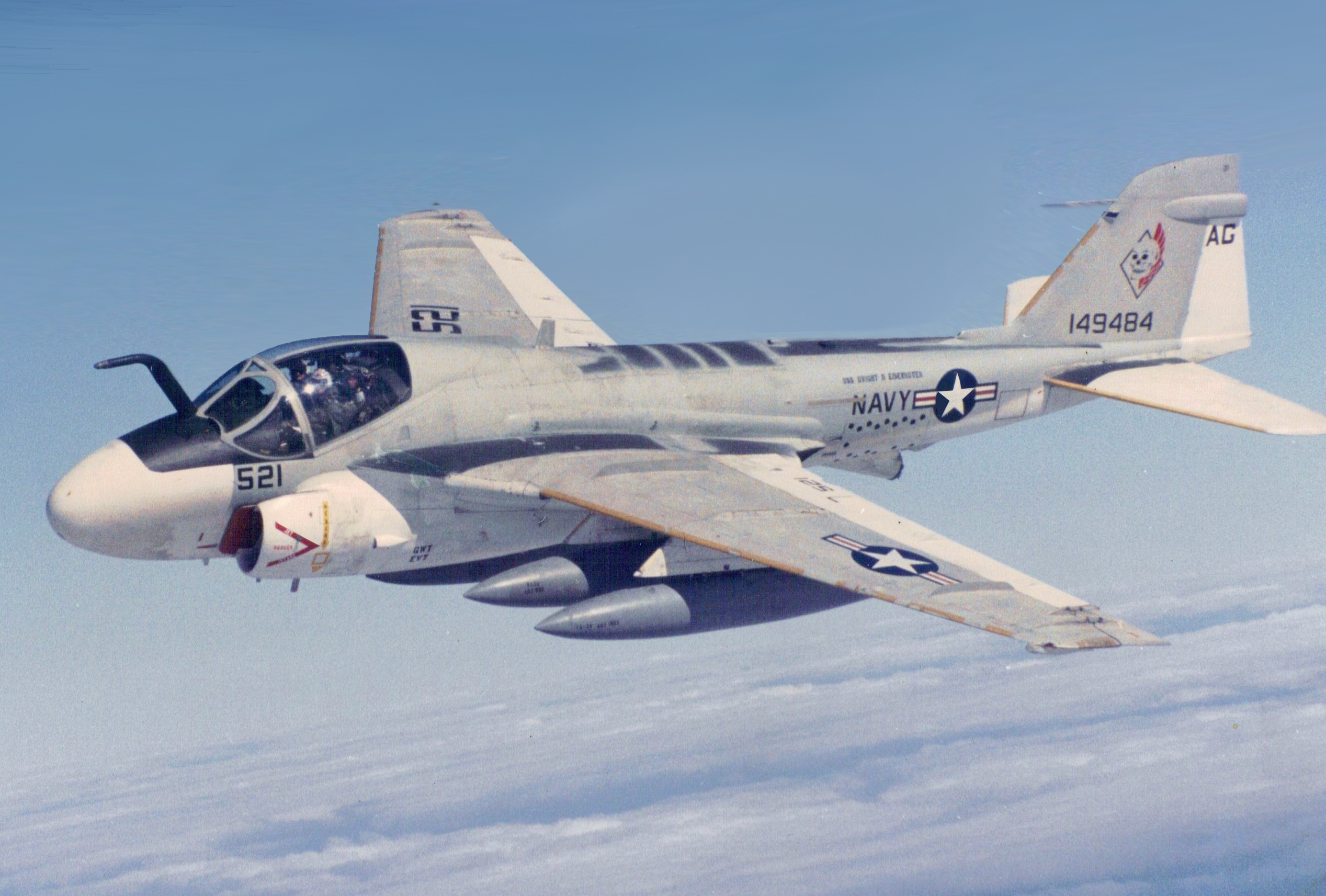
A VA-34 KA-6D Intruder in 1988

VA-34 deployed aboard USS America, in August 1982 for an eight-week North Atlantic cruise. The squadron subsequently made deployments to the Mediterranean Sea and Indian Ocean in 1982 and 1984. In September 1985 while deployed aboard USS America to the North Atlantic, the squadron conducted flight operations from the carrier while it operated within the Vestfjorden, a Norwegian fjord.

On 24 March 1986, Libyan missiles were fired at U.S. Navy forces operating in the Gulf of Sidra. As a result of this hostile act, the squadron participated in retaliatory strikes Operation Prairie Fire against Libya by the U.S. 6th Fleet forces in the area. VA-34's A-6E Intruders, operating from USS America, attacked and damaged a Libyan Beir Grassa-class fast attack missile craft with an AGM-84 Harpoon missile marking the first combat employment of Harpoon. On the night of 14 April 1986, the squadron conducted a low-level, high-speed attack against targets at the Benina airfield and military barracks in Benghazi, Libya as part of Operation El Dorado Canyon.

In October 1986 the squadron detached from Carrier Air Wing One and joined Carrier Air Wing Seven aboard USS Dwight D. Eisenhower, deploying in February 1988 for an extended Mediterranean deployment. The squadron participated in operations off the Libyan Coast and returned to NAS Oceana in August 1988.

=== 1990s ===
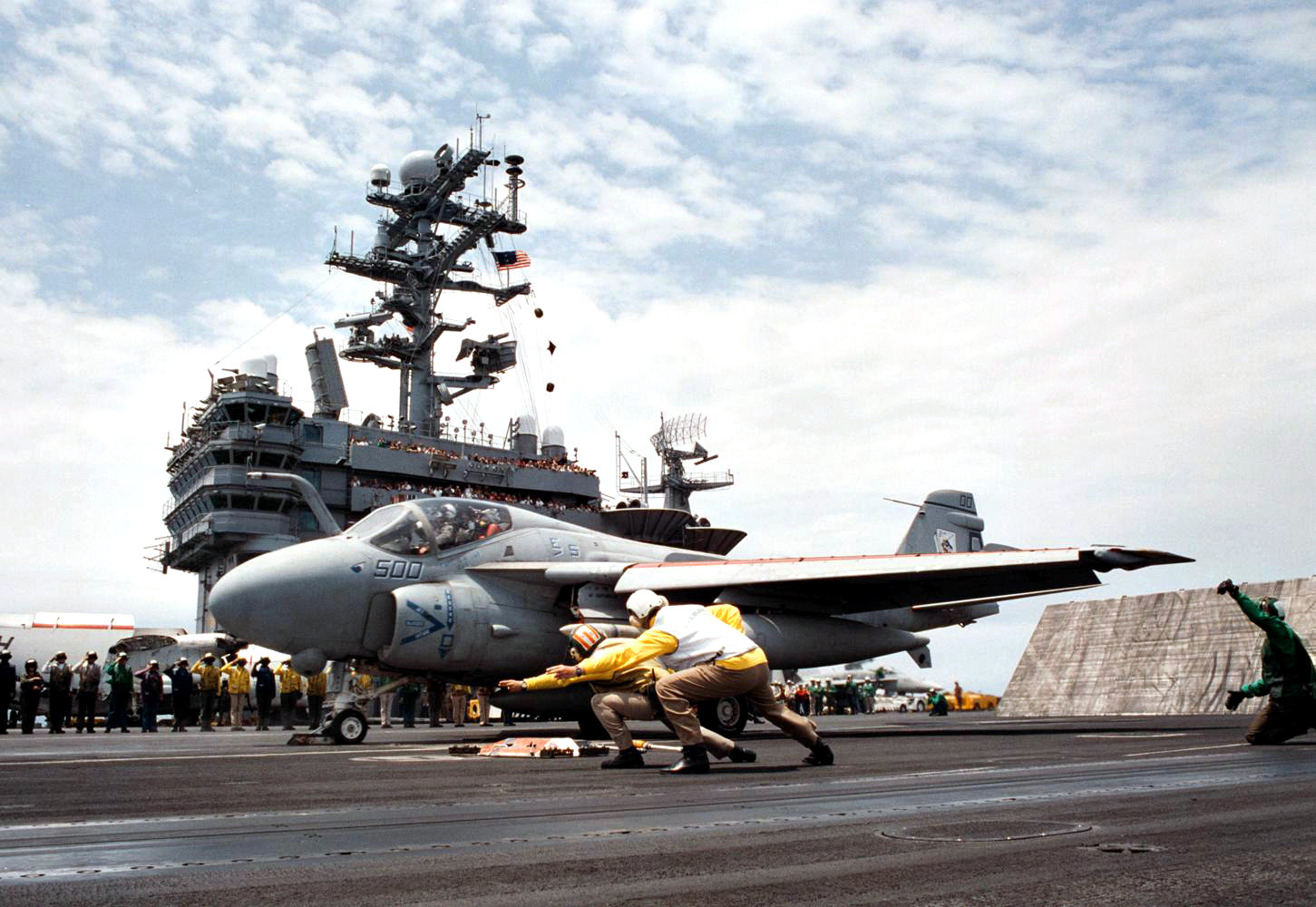
VA-34 making the last A-6 launch from USS George Washington, 22 July 1996.

The squadron's deployment in 1990 featured integration of night vision goggles and Standoff Land Attack Missile capability into their A-6Es. In 1990, USS Dwight D. Eisenhower completed her seventh Mediterranean deployment. The deployment became a commemorative event in the worldwide 'Dwight D. Eisenhower Centennial,' celebrating the 100th anniversary of the late President's birth. During D-Day anniversary ceremonies off the coast of Normandy, President Eisenhower's son John Eisenhower and D-Day veterans embarked on the ship, while Carrier Air Wing Seven conducted a memorial flyover of the Normandy American Cemetery and Memorial at Omaha Beach. In August 1990, the squadron flew missions from the Red Sea in support of Operation Desert Shield, the buildup of American and Allied forces to counter a threatened invasion of Saudi Arabia by Iraq.

The squadron returned home in September 1990 and returned to Southwest Asia in September 1991. The squadron returned to NAS Oceana, on 2 April 1992. The squadron's next deployment was from May to November 1994, embarked on USS George Washington for her maiden voyage.

In June 1994, the squadron commemorated the 50th Anniversary of D-Day with a "missing man" formation over Omaha Beach, which was televised worldwide by CNN. The squadron was awarded the Commander, Naval Air Force, U.S. Atlantic Fleet Battle "E" for 1994 and 1995. VA-34 departed in January 1996 aboard USS George Washington for their last A-6E Intruder deployment. They flew in support of Operation Decisive Endeavor over Bosnia and Herzegovina and Operation Southern Watch over Southern Iraq. Typical missions included close air support assisting US and United Nations troops on the ground.

On 30 September 1996, Attack Squadron 34 was redesignated Strike Fighter Squadron 34 (VFA-34) and returned once again to NAS Cecil Field, Florida. The squadron immediately began the transition to the F/A-18 Hornet. In June 1998, VFA-34 deployed aboard USS Dwight D. Eisenhower in support of Operation Deliberate Force and Operation Southern Watch. The squadron returned to NAS Cecil Field in December 1998. In March 1999, the squadron conducted a homeport shift from NAS Cecil Field to NAS Oceana.

=== 2000s ===
The squadron embarked on USS George Washington in June 2000 for deployment to the Mediterranean Sea, Arabian Sea, and Persian Gulf in support of Operations Southern Watch and Deliberate Forge. In December 2000, the squadron returned to NAS Oceana. Upon their return, the squadron received the Wade McClusky Award as the most outstanding attack squadron in the U.S. Navy, and the Commander, Naval Air Force U.S. Atlantic Fleet Battle E Award as the finest East Coast Strike Fighter Squadron.

The squadron embarked on USS George Washington in June 2002 for another deployment to the Mediterranean Sea, Arabian Sea, and Persian Gulf in support of Operation Enduring Freedom and Operation Southern Watch, returning to NAS Oceana in December 2002.

VFA-34 returned to USS John F. Kennedy for her last combat cruise in 2004, deploying to the Mediterranean Sea/Persian Gulf in support of Operations Iraqi Freedom and Enduring Freedom.

In March 2005, VFA-34 became operationally attached to Carrier Air Wing Two (CVW-2), deploying aboard the west coast carrier USS Abraham Lincoln for Operations Valiant Shield and Foal Eagle 2006. Between 24 and 31 March 2006, during Foal Eagle 2006 exercises, VFA-2, VFA-34, VFA-137, and VFA-151 from (CVW-2) teamed with U.S. Air Force aircraft from the 18th Wing based at Kadena Air Base to provide combat air patrols and coordinated bombing runs via the exercise's Combined Air Operations Center. The squadron returned home to NAS Oceana in August 2006.

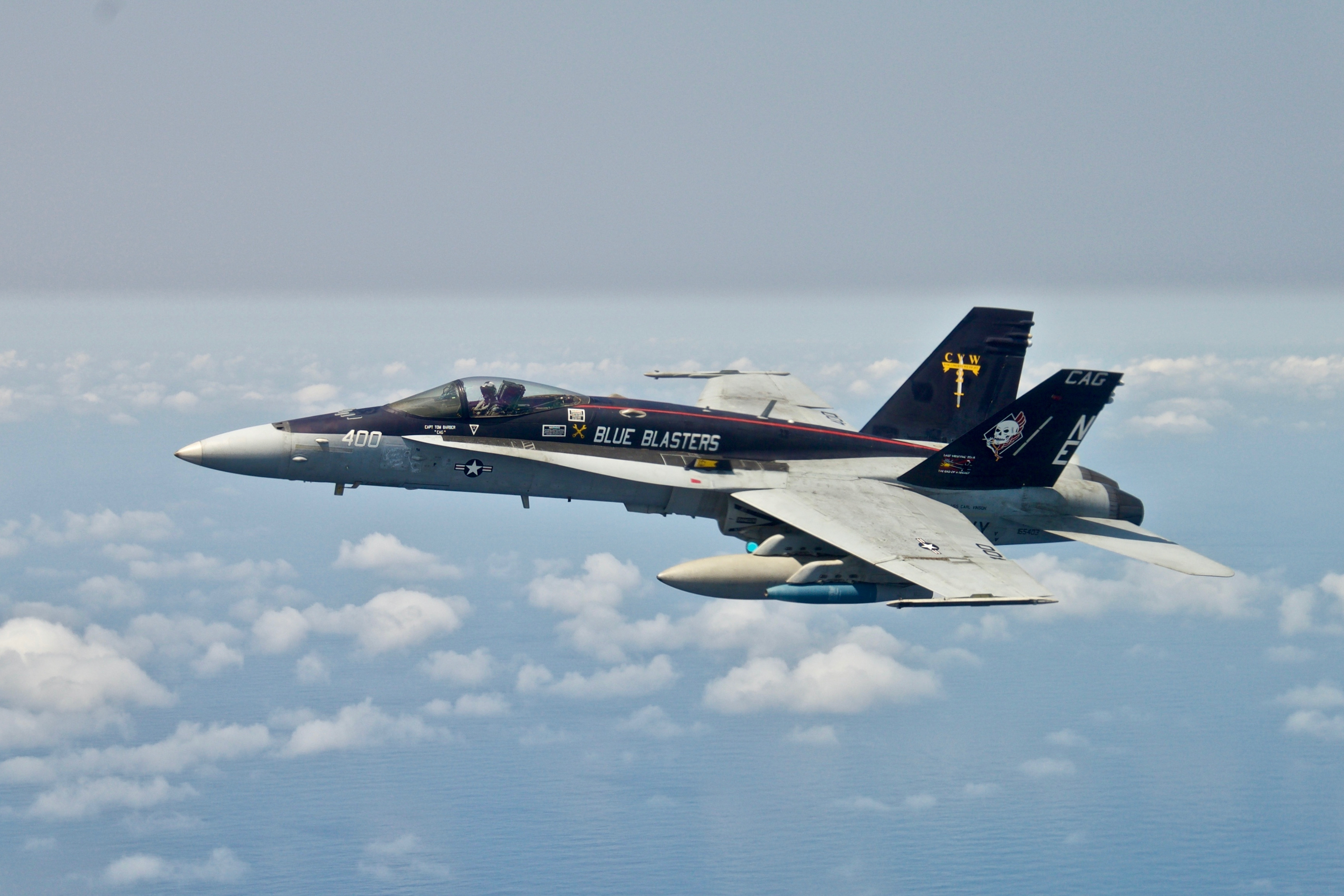
VFA-34 F/A-18C in flight over the Pacific Ocean on 20 March 2018.

In March 2008 the squadron again deployed on USS Abraham Lincoln. Reporting to the 5th Fleet Operating Area, VFA-34 launched strikes over Iraq and Afghanistan, returning home in October 2008.

After an extended stand down period the squadron returned to USS Abraham Lincoln for deployment back to the Persian Gulf and the Gulf of Oman from 7 September 2010 to 24 March 2011. In 2012, the squadron won the Battle "E" award for excellence during a period of sustained readiness and combat operations. When Abraham Lincoln began its Refueling and Complex Overhaul in 2013, CVW-2 was reassigned to USS Ronald Reagan. The wing made only a short deployment aboard Ronald Reagan during exercise RIMPAC between June and August 2014, before the carrier was stationed in Japan. CVW-2 then accompanied USS George Washington for her voyage around South America from September to December 2015.

In 2016, CVW-2 and VFA-34 were reassigned to USS Carl Vinson. The wing made its next deployment to the Western Pacific and the Indian Ocean aboard Carl Vinson from 23 January to 23 June 2017.

On 5 January 2018, VFA-34 left San Diego aboard Carl Vinson for another scheduled deployment to the Western Pacific.

This deployment marked the final "Legacy" Hornet deployment for the squadron as upon their return, they will transition to the F/A-18E Super Hornet. On 1 February 2019, the squadron bid its final farewell to the F/A-18C Hornet. As the final operational "Legacy" Hornet in the U.S. Navy, that flight also happened to be the final F/A-18C flight by a deployable squadron.

== In popular culture ==
The VFA-34 logo is featured in the television show The Brink as the logo of the fictional squadron VFA-181 "The Smokin' Skulls."

== Aircraft assignment ==
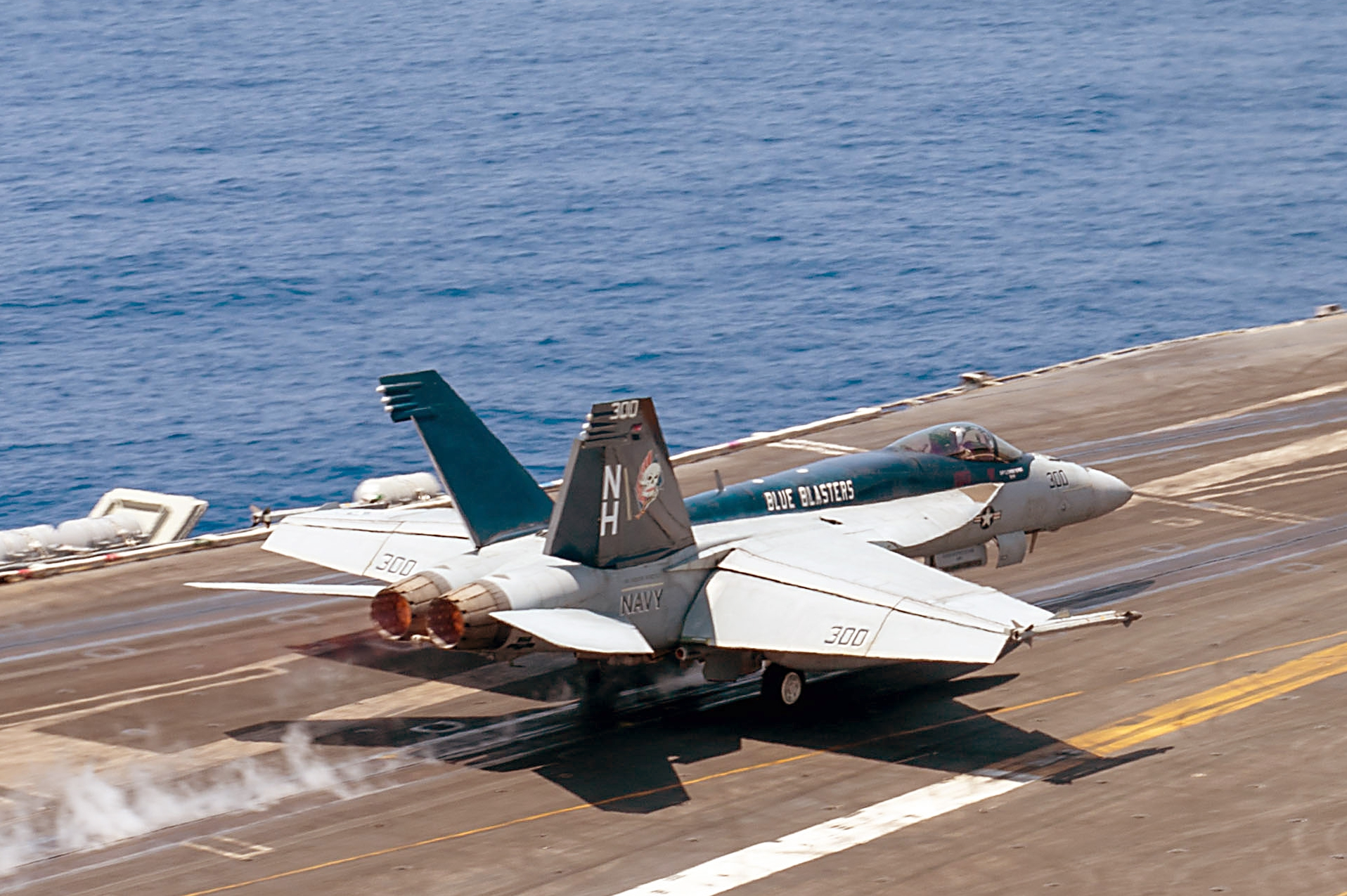
A VFA-34 F/A-18E aboard USS Theodore Roosevelt, 16 April 2024.

The squadron first received the following aircraft on the dates shown:

- A-6A Intruder – 17 Apr 1970
- A-6B Intruder – May 1970
- KA-6D Intruder – 1971
- A-6C Intruder – 1971
- A-6E Intruder – Dec 1973
- F/A-18C Hornet - 1996
- F/A-18E Super Hornet - 2019

== See also ==
- Naval aviation
- Modern US Navy carrier air operations
- List of United States Navy aircraft squadrons
- List of Inactive United States Navy aircraft squadrons
