= Douglas Baker (aviator) =

American military aviator (1921–1944)

- Born: August 27, 1921; Lindsay, Oklahoma
- Died: December 14, 1944 (aged 23); Luzon, Philippines
- Burial place: McClain County, Oklahoma
- Military career
- Allegiance: United States
- Branch: United States Navy
- Service years: 1942–1944
- Rank: LTJG
- Unit: VF-20
- Awards: Navy Cross; Silver Star (2); Distinguished Flying Cross (3); Purple Heart

Douglas Baker (August 27, 1921 – December 14, 1944) was a United States Navy fighter pilot and flying ace during World War II. Baker was a F6F Hellcat pilot and triple ace with 16.3 aerial victories.

== See also ==
- USS Enterprise (CV-6)
