= USS Angler =

Submarine of the United States

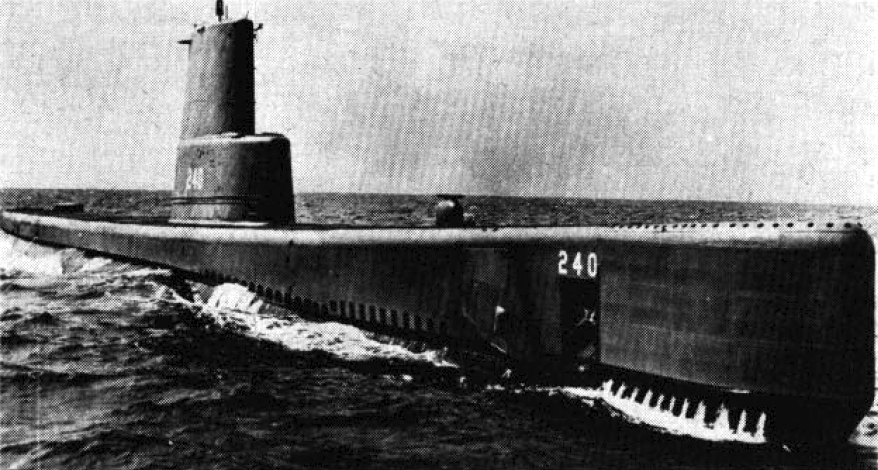
- Angler underway after her SSK-conversion

History

United States
- Builder: General Dynamics Electric Boat, Groton, Connecticut
- Laid down: 9 November 1942
- Launched: 4 July 1943
- Sponsored by: Mrs. Patrick H. Drewry
- Commissioned: 1 October 1943
- Decommissioned: 2 February 1947
- Recommissioned: 2 April 1951
- Decommissioned: 10 November 1952
- Recommissioned: 10 September 1953
- Decommissioned: 1 April 1968
- Stricken: 15 December 1971
- Fate: Sold for scrap, 1 February 1974

General characteristics
- Class & type: Gato-class diesel-electric submarine
- Displacement: 1,525 long tons (1,549 t) surfaced, 2,424 long tons (2,463 t) submerged
- Length: 311 ft 9 in (95.02 m)
- Beam: 27 ft 3 in (8.31 m)
- Draft: 17 ft (5.2 m) maximum
- Propulsion: 4 × General Motors Model 16-248 V16 Diesel engines driving electric generators; 2 × 126-cell Sargo batteries; 4 × high-speed General Electric electric motors with reduction gears; two propellers; 5,400 shp (4.0 MW) surfaced; 2,740 shp (2.0 MW) submerged
- Speed: 21 kn (39 km/h) surfaced, 9 kn (17 km/h) submerged
- Range: 11,000 nmi (20,000 km) surfaced @ 10 kn (19 km/h)
- Endurance: 48 hours @ 2 kn (3.7 km/h) submerged, 75 days on patrol
- Test depth: 300 ft (91 m)
- Complement: 6 officers, 54 enlisted
- Armament: 10 × 21-inch (533 mm) torpedo tubes; 6 forward, 4 aft; 24 torpedoes; 1 × 3-inch (76 mm) / 50 caliber deck gun; Bofors 40 mm and Oerlikon 20 mm cannon

USS Angler (SS-240), a Gato-class submarine, was the only ship of the United States Navy to be named for the anglerfish.

== Construction and commissioning ==
Angler′s keel was laid down on 9 November 1942 by the Electric Boat Company in Groton, Connecticut. She was launched on 4 July 1943, sponsored by Mrs. Mary E. Drewry (née Metcalf), the wife of Congressman Patrick H. Drewry of the House Naval Affairs Committee, and commissioned at New London, Connecticut, on 1 October 1943.

== Service history ==
=== World War II ===
Following shakedown in the New London and Newport, Rhode Island, area, Angler sailed to Key West, Florida. She arrived on 21 November and after one week of operations with the Fleet Sound School, sailed for Pearl Harbor on 27 November.

Selected to be transferred from Pearl Harbor, Angler commenced her first war patrol on 10 January 1944, her patrol to terminate at Fremantle, Australia. Angler encountered a Japanese convoy north of the Mariana Islands on 29 January, and attacked with torpedoes. She claimed to have sunk one ship and damaged two others, but postwar records confirmed only the sinking of Shuko Maru. Having developed "structural noises" which prevented silent running, Angler turned back to Midway Island for repairs, arriving on 4 February.

Angler began her second war patrol on 15 February, assigned the waters off the east coast of the Philippines in the Mindanao Sea and Sulu Sea. While she was nearing her patrol area, General Douglas MacArthur had learned that the Japanese were massacring all the civilians they could find on the island of Panay. MacArthur requested that a submarine be assigned to evacuate what was believed to be about twenty civilians from the island. The task fell to Angler, and she found 58 men, women, and children awaiting rescue. Angler took all of them on board and berthed them in the forward and after torpedo rooms. Meals were limited to two per day in an attempt to stretch the submarine's overtaxed food supply. Toward the end of the cruise, many of the passengers and crew became nauseous. The captain suspected the water supply may have been contaminated, and requested that the fresh water tanks be cleaned upon arrival at Fremantle on 9 April.

Angler sailed on 3 May for another patrol as one of eight submarines assigned to support the Operation Transom carrier strike scheduled to hit Surabaya, Java. Their job would be to sink retreating Japanese ships, to provide lifeguard services, and to guard the major passages from the Java Sea (the Sunda Strait and Lombok Strait) to the Indian Ocean lest the Japanese try to move into the Indian Ocean to attack the Allied strike force. Launched as scheduled on 17 May the strikes achieved complete surprise.

The only action of the patrol for Angler came on 20 May, when she torpedoed and sank Otori Maru. Japanese escort vessels administered a bad pounding to Angler, but she escaped damage.

The next day, nausea again gripped everyone on board Angler. The situation was reported to Fremantle, and the submarine was ordered to return at once. Things onboard Angler continued to grow worse. On 22 May, Lieutenant Commander Olsen noted in the log: "Physical condition of officers and crew is so bad that it is difficult to maintain watch, either surface or submerged. Put crew on fruit juice alone, no water. Held thorough field day in case boat is contaminated. Exercised special supervision in cooking, dishwashing." On 23 May he wrote, "Decided to run submerged as we did not have enough able-bodied people to maintain proper surface watch."

Flasher and Childs were sent to intercept Angler and lend assistance. Crevalle also arrived and transferred a doctor to assist the ailing crewmembers. Angler finally arrived at Fremantle on 29 May. An investigation concluded that an electrician had taken a can of carbon tetrachloride on board as a cleaning agent, which was strictly forbidden. Although the illness was attributed the tetrachloride, some suspected that the fresh water tanks had not been cleaned as requested.

Angler began her fourth war patrol on 21 June. She paused to refuel alongside a barge in Exmouth Gulf on 24 June, and while maneuvering into position, hit an uncharted obstruction. Returning to Fremantle for repairs, Angler was underway again on 29 June with a new starboard propeller. She rendezvoused with Flasher and Crevalle to carry out one of the first "wolfpack" patrols of the war. The group worked the middle area of the South China Sea and along the Indochinese coast, without success. They were then ordered to move to a position off the west coast of Luzon. On 25 July, Angler and her sister ships picked up a large northbound convoy and began a series of attacks over the next few days. While Angler failed to damage any ships, the pack as a whole sank six ships for 36,000 tons. The patrol continued uneventfully until 23 August, when Angler returned to Fremantle.

On 18 September, the submarine departed on her next patrol, to operate with Bluegill in the Sulu Sea. On 14 October Angler torpedoed and sank Nanrei Maru.

At 0145 on 22 October, the men on watch on Angler's bridge were startled by voices calling out of the darkness. Repeated attempts to locate the source of the voices proved unsuccessful, but the dawn soon revealed "one of the most gruesome sights imaginable as far as you could see ..." the water literally covered with wreckage and dead Japanese, most clad in Army uniforms. Aircraft in the vicinity made it too risky to stop and investigate a lifeboat, but Angler returned at sunset. At 1806, she brought this boat alongside and counted 26 surviving men, both soldiers and naval ratings. Determining who was the senior officer of the group, the submarine retained three men for questioning, and after giving the men remaining in the boat some food, water, and a course to land, 80 nautical miles (150 km) away, released the lifeboat. The three prisoners retained on board – Second Lieutenant Seigi Shimazu, Sergeant Sei Fuji, and Sergeant Toyonaga Nishikawa – had willingly agreed to go along with the Americans.

At 1915 on 23 October, Angler made radar contact with the main Japanese force steaming to contest the Allied invasion of Leyte. Angler tracked the task force until 0240 the following morning, and her contact reports proved of inestimable value to the American forces off Leyte. Ironically, Angler had just made the only worthwhile contact with the only worthwhile convoy of her entire patrol. Although the maneuvers to clear the convoy took her 10 nmi (19 km) astern of the task force, Angler forsook the convoy of civilian ships for the military task force. On 1 November, Angler rendezvoused with Hardhead, and received onboard Commander Fred E. Bakutis, a pilot from Fighting Squadron 20 (VF-20) who had been rescued by Hardhead a short time before. Angler returned to Fremantle on 9 November.

On 4 December, Angler left on her sixth patrol, during which time she served a brief period of lifeguard duty. On 13 December, Bergall was fired on by a Japanese destroyer. A shell tore a large hole in Bergall's pressure hull and left the submarine unable to dive. Angler, operating in the Java Sea, received orders to proceed to Bergall's assistance, take off the crew and torpedo the ship. She found the crippled submarine on 15 December. Bergall's commanding officer, Commander John Hyde, had decided to remain in Bergall with a skeleton crew. Angler trailed Bergall to take everyone off if a Japanese attack threatened. The two submarines traveled nearly 2,000 nmi (3,700 km), through waters mostly controlled by the enemy, and reached Exmouth Gulf safely on 20 December without seeing any Japanese airplanes or ships.

Angler resumed her patrol, but contacted no enemy shipping. She put in at Saipan briefly on 6 February 1945, then continued on to Pearl Harbor. Angler reached the West Coast of the United States on 24 February, and immediately began overhaul at the Bethlehem Steel Company yard at San Francisco, California. She was underway again on 18 May, and by 12 June was ready to begin her seventh and final war patrol. On 27 June, she made a fuel stop at Saipan then sailed to patrol the waters east of Honshū. At that stage of the war, shipping targets were few and far between, and Angler made only two contacts. One of these moved away faster than Angler could close, but the submarine developed the other into an unsuccessful torpedo attack on 25 July.

Angler did, however, conduct three shore bombardment missions during this patrol. The first - on 26 July - found her making a careful reconnaissance to locate a Japanese installation on Kinkasan Island. From a range of about 3,000–4,000 yd (2,700–3,700 m), Angler hurled 25 5 in (130 mm) rounds at a target area containing closely bunched buildings, radio towers, and a lighthouse. Although she claimed at least 20 hits, the large clouds of smoke and dust made a closer assessment of damage impossible.

Five days later, on 31 July, after an all-day close-in observation, Angler surfaced at dusk in a thick fog, off Tomakomai, on Hokkaidō, and fired 50 5 in (130 mm) rounds at what looked like a thickly congested factory installation. On 1 August, Angler joined Sea Poacher and Thornback in carrying out a coordinated gun action against boat sheds and boats; Angler firing 23 rounds of five-inch, 320 rounds of 40 mm and 300 rounds of 20 mm.

=== Post-War ===
Angler arrived at Midway on 9 August, and was there when hostilities ceased on 15 August. She sailed for Pearl Harbor on 26 August and paused there briefly before continuing on to the United States. The submarine transited the Panama Canal on 14 September, and called at New Orleans, Louisiana on 20 September. A month of leave and upkeep followed, and on 24 October, Angler got underway for Jacksonville, Florida. She continued on to Newport to unload her torpedoes on 2 November, and arrived at New London on 6 November. Angler sailed to Portsmouth, New Hampshire in February 1946 to begin deactivation. She returned to New London on 21 April, and was decommissioned there on 12 February.

Following her recommissioning on 2 April 1951, Angler held shakedown in the Caribbean Sea. She then began operations from her home port of New London. In October 1952, Angler was decommissioned and entered the General Dynamics Corporation yard at Groton, Connecticut, for overhaul and conversion. During the overhaul, one of her four diesel engines was removed to make room for advanced sonar equipment, part of her conversion to a "hunter-killer submarine". She was redesignated SSK-240 in February 1953.

Upon completion of overhaul, Angler was recommissioned in September 1953 and rejoined the Atlantic Fleet. Following her shakedown in the West Indies from November 1953-March 1954, she returned to New London. She then operated along the East Coast and in the West Indies for the next two years, taking part in numerous Atlantic Fleet exercises, and spent the period from January through April 1956 undergoing overhaul at the Portsmouth Naval Shipyard. Angler made a training cruise to the West Indies, then returned to the East Coast. In October, she deployed to northern Europe and visited several ports in Britain before returning in December to New London.

Angler spent the first eight months of 1957 participating in exercises along the East Coast. On 27 September, she was underway for Europe to take part in NATO fleet exercises. She then visited Dieppe, France and the Isle of Portland, England before returning to New London. Her final operation of the year was a training cruise to Bermuda in November.

From 24 February-23 March 1958, Angler participated in Operation "Springboard," held in the West Indies and Caribbean, following those evolutions with numerous training exercises. On 3 November, Angler once again entered the Portsmouth Naval Shipyard for overhaul. Repairs were completed in March 1959, and the submarine resumed her schedule of operations and exercises along the East Coast. She also rendered services to the Submarine School, New London. In 1960, the ship reverted to her original designation, SS-240.

On 24 October 1962, Angler commenced her first deployment to the 6th Fleet and conducted operations in the Mediterranean Sea. In the course of her deployment, she visited ports in Spain, Italy, France, and Greece. She returned to New London on 6 February 1963 and resumed operations with the submarine school. In 1963, Angler was redesignated AGSS-240. For the remainder of her career, the submarine continued her pattern of periodic deployments to the Caribbean and West Indies, made midshipman and Naval Reserve training cruises, and operated in conjunction with the submarine school.

Angler was decommissioned on 1 April 1968 and was assigned to the Naval Reserve training program at Philadelphia, Pennsylvania. On 30 June 1971, she was redesignated IXSS-240. Her name was struck from the Naval Vessel Register on 15 December 1971. Sold to the Union Minerals and Alloys Corporation, of New York City on 1 February 1974, she was removed from naval custody on 4 March 1974 to be broken up for scrap.

== Awards ==
Angler won six battle stars for her World War II service.
