= VA-34 (1943–1969) =

Attack Squadron 34
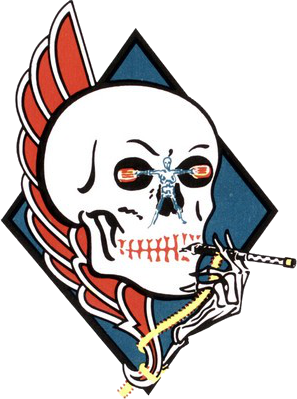
- VA-34 squadron insignia
- Active: 15 October 1943 – 1 June 1969
- Country: United States
- Branch: United States Navy
- Role: Attack aircraft
- Part of: Inactive
- Nickname: Blue Blasters
- Engagements: World War II; 1958 Lebanon crisis Bay of Pigs Invasion; Cuban Missile Crisis; Vietnam War

Aircraft flown
- Attack: F6F-3/5 Hellcat; F8F-1/2 Bearcat; F9F-2 Panther; F2H-2 Banshee; F7U-3 Cutlass; A4D-1/2/C Skyhawk

VA-34, nicknamed the Blue Blasters, was an Attack Squadron of the U.S. Navy. The squadron was established as Fighter Squadron VF-20 on 15 October 1943, redesignated as VF-9A on 15 November 1946, as VF-91 on 12 August 1948, and as VF-34 on 15 February 1950. It was finally redesignated VA-34 on 1 July 1955. The squadron was disestablished on 1 June 1969. It was the second squadron to bear the VA-34 designation, the first one having been renamed VA-35 in 1950.

== Squadron Insignia and Nickname ==
The squadron's first insignia was approved for use by VF-20 during World War II, and was a "Joker" breaking out of a deck of cards carrying a machine gun. This insignia was selected by the squadron because the young and inexperienced pilots in the squadron were referred to as the "Jokers". It was approved by Chief of Naval Operations on 15 March 1944. The next insignia adopted by the squadron was the outline of a human skull, approved by CNO on 1 February 1946. Superimposed on the nose of a skull was a human skeleton with the arms holding paddles that became the eyes of the skull, while the teeth were represented by the word “Fighting 20.” On 10 June 1949, CNO approved another modification to the squadron insignia which embellished the skull design. This insignia was in use from 1949 until the squadron's disestablishment in 1969. In 1957 the squadron adopted the Blue Blasters nickname, taking inspiration from their blue tail colors and their nuclear weapon delivery capability; hence the name "Blue Blasters."

== Operational history ==
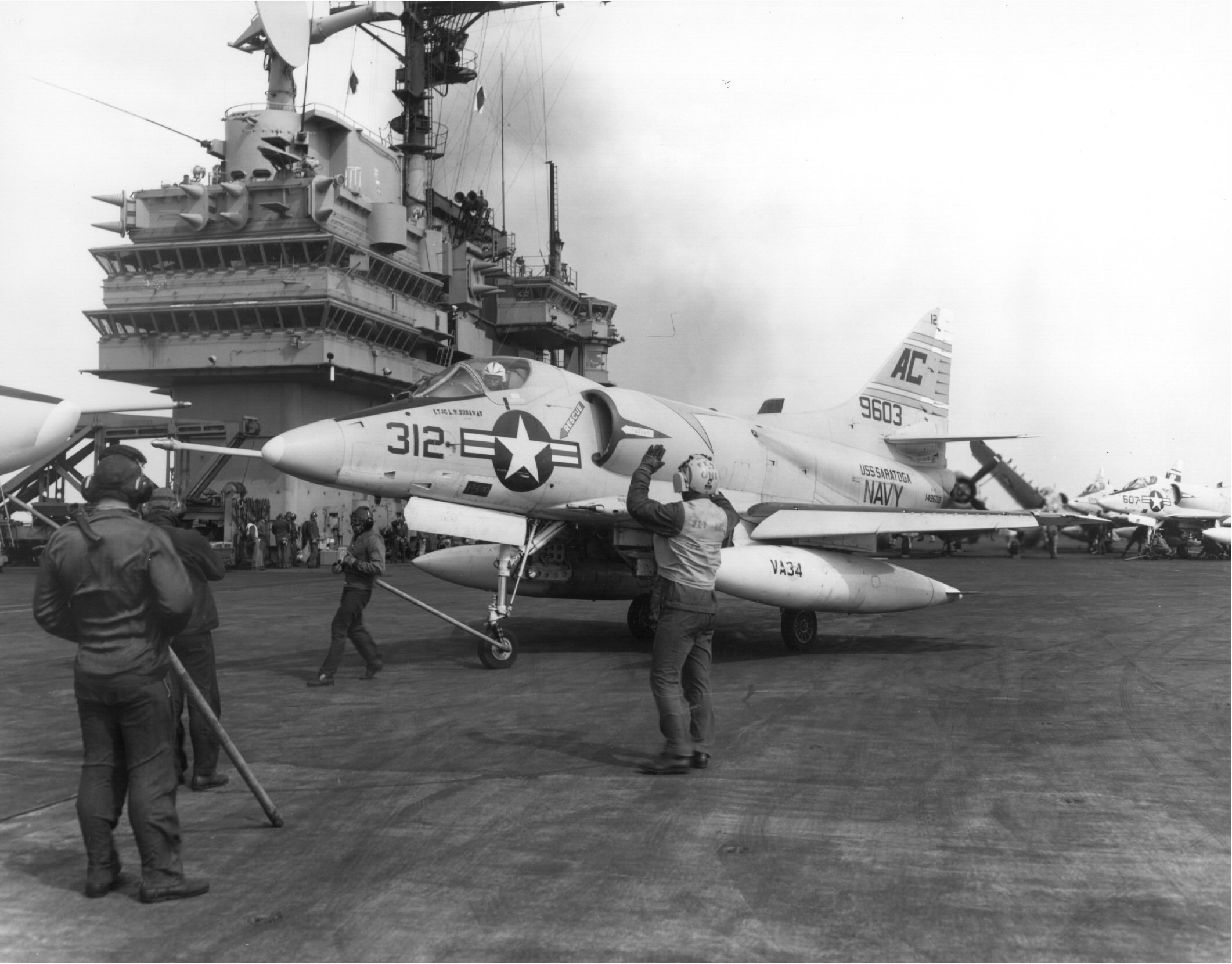
VA-34 A-4C prepares to launch from USS Saratoga c.1963

=== World War II ===
VF-20 "Jokers" was established on 15 October 1943 as part of Air Group 20 stationed at Naval Air Station San Diego, California. The squadron was composed of numerous newly winged Naval Aviators along with a few combat veterans. On 16 April 1944 the squadron departed Naval Air Station Alameda aboard USS Essex en route to Hawaii for four months of operational training prior to its first combat tour.

On 31 August 1944, the squadron's first combat action came as combat strikes were flown from USS Enterprise (CV-6) in squadron F6F Hellcats against the Bonin Islands. Strikes followed to Yap and Palau Islands, Peleliu Island, Okinawa, Formosa, Luzon, and Leyte. VF-20 was heavily involved in the initial invasion operations in the Philippines, including the epic Battle of Leyte Gulf from 24–25 October 1944. VF-20 aircraft struck elements of all three Japanese Task Forces which were converging on Leyte Gulf.

On 11 December 1944, VF-20 cross-decked to the USS Lexington

On 14 December 1944, Lieutenant (junior grade) Douglas Baker was on a strike mission against Clark Field on Luzon when he encountered Japanese fighter opposition. During this engagement he destroyed four Japanese aircraft before being shot down by antiaircraft fire and lost in the action. This final action brought his air-to-air kills to 16, making him one of the high ranking aces for the Navy. Only eight other Navy pilots equaled or exceeded this record.

From December 1944 to January 1945, VF-20 engaged in another series of combat actions, flying missions against targets on and around Luzon, Formosa, French Indochina (Vietnam), Hong Kong, the South China Sea, and Okinawa. Many of these operations were in support of the landings at Lingayen Gulf.

As part of Admiral Halsey's Northern Strike Group, VF-20 assisted in sinking one of the world's largest battleships, the Japanese battleship Musashi (sister ship to the Yamato), and was given credit for partial kills on several Japanese cruisers and destroyers.

22 January 1945 was the last day of combat action for the squadron during World War II. In February 1945 the Jokers embarked on USS Kwajalein at Ulithi and departed for the United States, arriving there in the latter part of the month.

During WWII, eight VF-20 pilots became aces, 12 pilots received the Navy Cross and 22 received the Silver Star. VF-20 was credited with the destruction of over 15 ships and 407 aircraft, not counting the even greater number that were damaged but not destroyed. For their combat efforts the command was awarded the Presidential Unit Citation in 1944 and 1945, along with the Navy Unit Citation while aboard Enterprise.

In April 1946, the squadron transitioned to the F8F Bearcat.

From July to September 1948, in cooperation with Commander Operational Development Force, Atlantic Fleet, the squadron participated in the experimental carrier controlled approach program aboard the USS Philippine Sea.

=== 1950s ===
In November 1950, VF-34 transitioned to its first jet aircraft, the F9F Panther.

After returning from a cruise aboard USS Leyte in December 1951, the unit transferred to NAS Cecil Field, Florida.

In February 1952, the squadron began initial training in the F2H Banshee

In April 1953 the squadron embarked on USS Antietam with its F2H-2s to conduct evaluation tests on the Navy's angled deck.

On 26 May 1954 the squadron was aboard USS Bennington, en route to the Mediterranean Sea, when an explosion aboard ship resulted in the death of 7 squadron personnel. The ship returned to the States and the squadron disembarked.

On 31 October 1954 Ensign Duane L. Varner completed a 1,900 mile nonstop, non-refueling, transcontinental flight from Los Alamitos, California, to NAS Cecil Field in a squadron F2H-2. His flight took 3 hours and 58 minutes and set a new long distance record for the Banshee.

In early 1956, VA-34 accepted its first F7U Cutlass, which it operated until receiving A-4 Skyhawks in March 1957. The squadron was the first Skyhawk squadron to deploy to the Mediterranean.

On 4 March 1958 during cross-deck operations, the squadron landed its A4D-1 Skyhawks aboard HMS Ark Royal.

In July 1958, VA-34 flew support missions during the amphibious landings in Beirut, Lebanon, by U.S. Marines.

In June 1959, whilst operating from NAS Mayport, the squadron conducted the first operational firing of the Bullpup air-to-ground missile in the Atlantic Fleet.

=== 1960s ===
From 1959 through 1966, the Blue Blasters operated from the decks of USS Saratoga (CVA-60) and USS Essex (CV-9).

In April 1961, VA-34's A4D-2 Skyhawks operated from USS Essex in the Caribbean Sea during the Bay of Pigs invasion. This operation involved the first use of jet attack aircraft as part of an ASW Air Group, CVSG-60, operating aboard an ASW designated carrier.

From 26 October to 8 November 1962 during the Cuban Missile Crisis, the entire squadron flew aboard USS Enterprise to augment the assigned air wing. VA-34 flew numerous missions in support of Cuban quarantine, later transferring to USS Independence until her return to the United States on 26 November.

From 3–21 December 1962 the squadron was aboard USS Saratoga for carrier refresher training in the Caribbean and continued operations relating to the Cuban Missile Crisis.

From December 1963 to February 1964 the squadron provided detachments of A-4C Skyhawks aboard USS Intrepid and USS Randolph. The aircraft were used for Combat Air Patrol to provide a fighter capability for the ASW carriers.

From May to December 1967, the squadron deployed to the Gulf of Tonkin during the Vietnam War aboard USS Intrepid. This was the squadron's first combat action since 1945.

Attack Squadron 34 was disestablished on 29 May 1969.

== Home port assignments ==
The squadron was assigned to these home ports, effective on the dates shown:

- Naval Air Station San Diego – 15 Oct 1943*
- Naval Air Station Atlantic City – 16 Apr 1945
- Naval Auxiliary Air Station Edenton – 26 Jun 1945
- Naval Auxiliary Air Station Elizabeth City – 02 Nov 1945
- Naval Auxiliary Air Station Charlestown – 11 Mar 1946
- Naval Air Station Quonset Point – 1 May 1947
- Naval Auxiliary Air Station Charlestown – 26 Jun 1948
- Naval Air Station Quonset Point – 01 Dec 1949
- Naval Air Station Sanford – 1 May 1951
- Naval Air Station Jacksonville – 06 Oct 1952
- Naval Air Station Cecil Field – 04 Feb 1953

* During the squadron's Pacific tour from April 1944 to February 1945 it operated from numerous air and shore stations.

== Aircraft assignment ==
The squadron first received the following aircraft on the dates shown:

- F6F-3 Hellcat – October 1943
- F6F-5 Hellcat – July 1944
- F8F-1 Bearcat – 3 April 1946
- F8F-2 Bearcat – 3 December 1948
- F9F-2 Panther – 27 November 1950
- F2H-2 Banshee – 14 February 1952
- F7U-3 Cutlass – 6 October 1955
- A4D-1 Skyhawk – January 1957
- A4D-2 Skyhawk – November 1958
- A4D-2N/A-4C Skyhawk – 7 July 1962

== See also ==
- VA-34 (U.S. Navy)
- VFA-34
- Attack aircraft
- List of inactive United States Navy aircraft squadrons
- History of the United States Navy
