= VF-16 =

Fighter Squadron 16
- Active: 1943–16 November 1945
- Country: United States
- Branch: United States Navy
- Type: Fighter
- Nickname: Fighting Airedales
- Engagements: World War II

Aircraft flown
- Fighter: Grumman F6F-3/5 Hellcat

Fighter Squadron 16 or VF-16 was an aviation unit of the United States Navy during World War II. Originally established in 1943, it was disestablished on 16 November 1945.

== Operational history ==
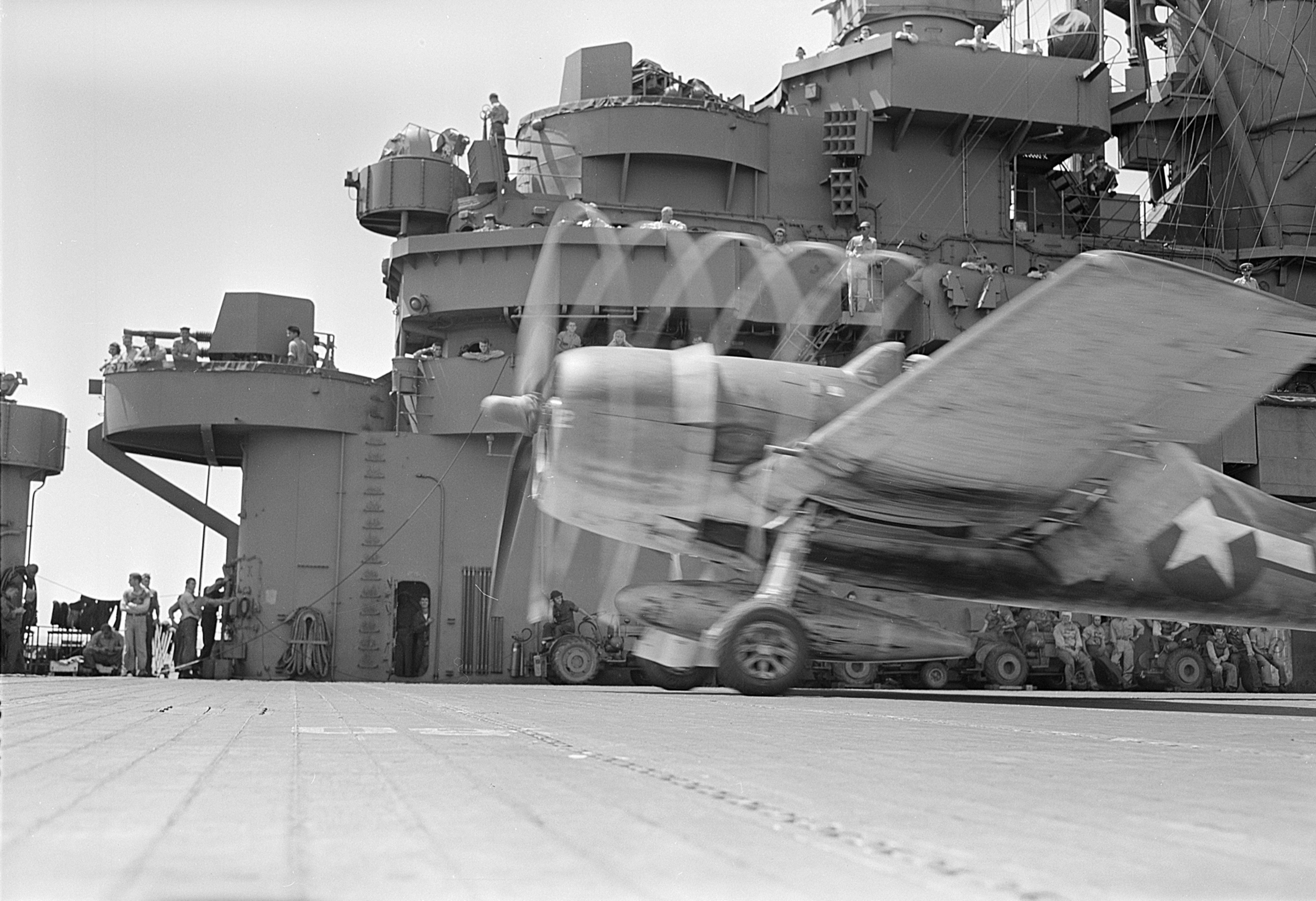
VF-16 F6F-3 takes off from USS Lexington in 1943

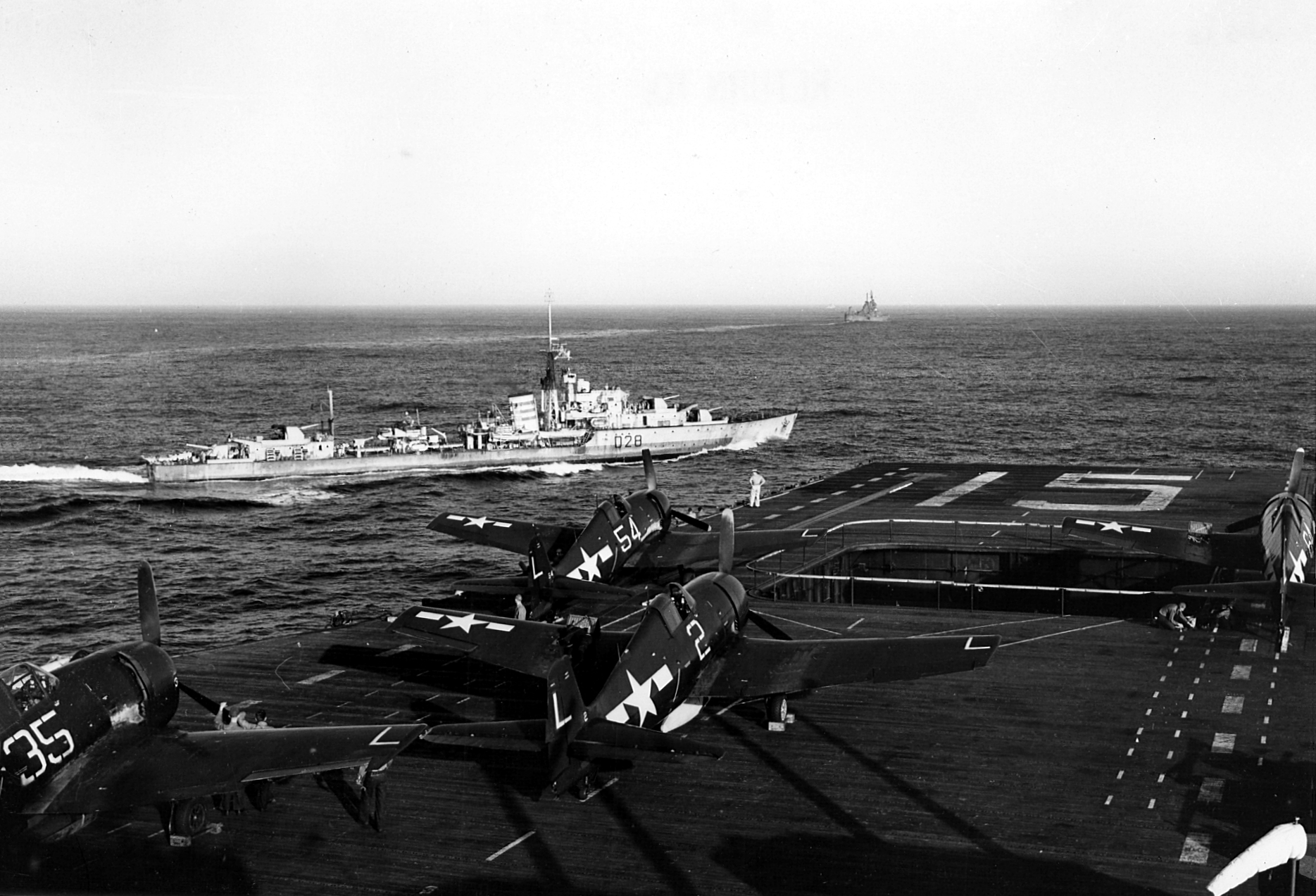
VF-16 F6F-5s on USS Randolph in August 1945

From late November 1943, VF-16 deployed on USS Lexington and supported the Gilbert and Marshall Islands campaign including the Battle of Tarawa. On 23 November VF-16's pilots shot down 17 Japanese aircraft. By the end of 1943 the pilots of VF-16 had shot down 55 Japanese aircraft, with three pilots becoming aces.

On 19 June 1944 while deployed on the Lexington, the squadron participated in the Marianas Turkey Shoot and squadron pilot Lt Alexander Vraciu shot down six Japanese Yokosuka D4Ys in eight minutes.

In 1945 VF-16 was deployed on USS Randolph.

== See also ==
- History of the United States Navy
- List of inactive United States Navy aircraft squadrons
- List of United States Navy aircraft squadrons
