= Second VA-35 (U.S. Navy) =

Attack Squadron 35
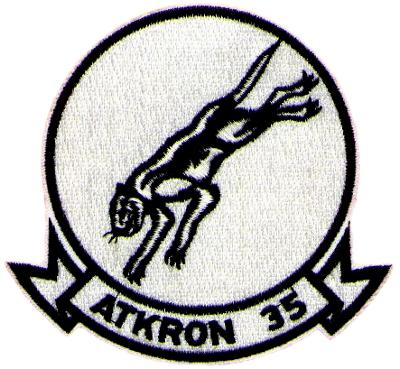
- VA-35 squadron patch
- Active: 1 July 1934 – 31 January 1995
- Country: United States
- Branch: United States Navy
- Role: Attack aircraft
- Part of: Inactive
- Nickname: Black Panthers
- Engagements: World War II; Korean War; 1958 Lebanon crisis Bay of Pigs Invasion; Cuban Missile Crisis; Vietnam War; Operation Formation Star; Operation Eagle Claw; Gulf War

Aircraft flown
- Attack: Martin BM; SB2U Vindicator; SBD Dauntless; A-1 Skyraider; A-6 Intruder

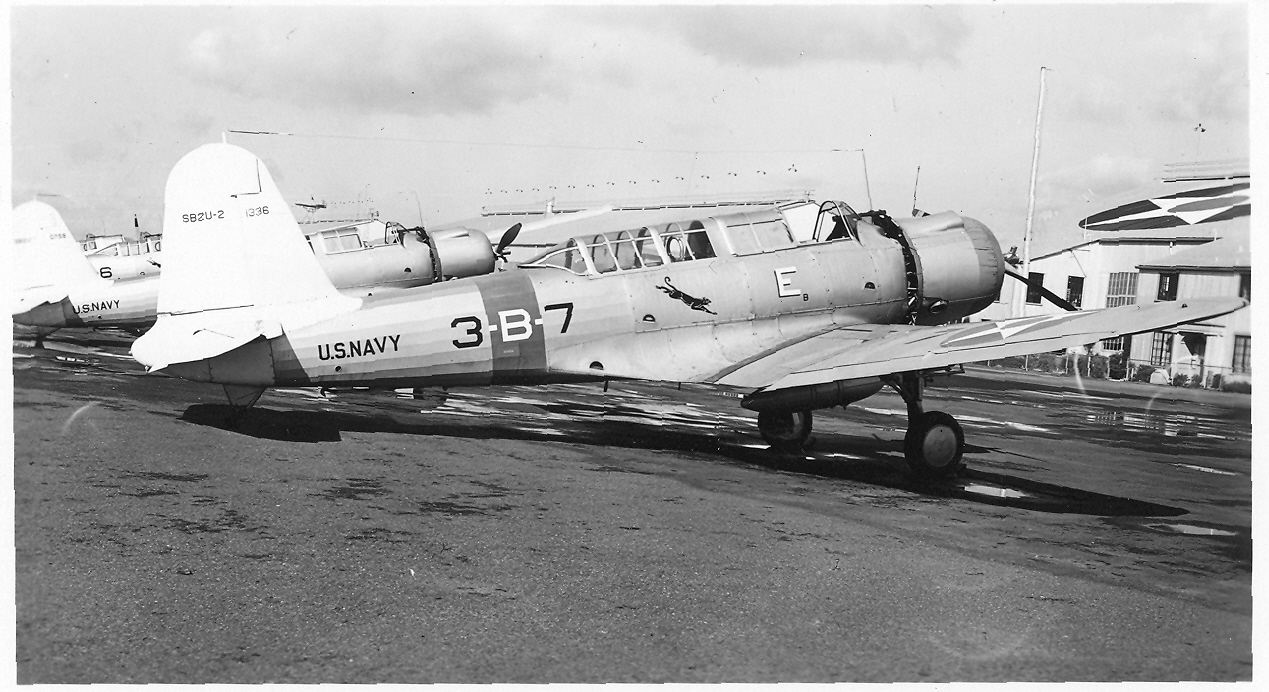
A Vought SB2U-2 Vindicator dive bomber from VB-4 at Oakland, California in 1940. Note the diving black panther insignia on the side.

Second VA-35, nicknamed the Black Panthers, was a long-lived Attack Squadron of the U.S. Navy. It was the second squadron to be assigned the VA-35 designation.

== History ==
The squadron was established as Bombing Squadron VB-3B at NAS Norfolk, Virginia, on 1 July 1934. It was subsequently redesignated VB-4 on 1 July 1937, as VB-3 on 1 July 1939, as VA-3A on 15 November 1946, and as VA-34 on 7 August 1948. It was finally designated VA-35 on 15 February 1950 (the first VA-35 had been disestablished on 7 November 1949). The diving black panther design first appeared in mid-1935, and was carried on through the various redesignations of the squadron. VA-35 was disestablished on 31 January 1995 after over 60 years of continuous service.

=== Pre-World War II ===
- May 1935: USS Ranger and her embarked air group, including VB-3B, participated in Fleet Exercise XVI. This was the first time VB-3B and Ranger participated in a Fleet Exercise.
- 25 November 1935 – 25 February 1936: A detachment from VB-3B, including six BG-1s, was assigned to Ranger’s Cold Weather Test Detachment and operated aboard Ranger in Alaskan waters.
- April–June 1936: The squadron participated in Fleet Problem XVII.
- April–May 1937: The squadron participated in Fleet Problem XVIII.
- 28 May 1937: VB-3B participated in an aerial review celebrating the opening of the Golden Gate Bridge.
- July 1937: The squadron, embarked on USS Lexington, participated in the search for Amelia Earhart and Fred Noonan.
- September 1937: VB-4, embarked on Ranger, visited Lima, Peru, in conjunction with the International Aviation Conference being held there.
- March–April 1938: The squadron participated in Fleet Problem XIX.
- April–May 1940: The squadron participated in Fleet Problem XXI. This was the last major fleet problem conducted before America's involvement in World War II.

=== World War II ===
- April 1942: VB-3, embarked on USS Enterprise, provided escort patrols for the task force which launched the Doolittle Raid against Tokyo.
- 4 Jun 1942: At the Battle of Midway, VB-3, embarked on USS Yorktown, engaged in its first combat operations. Yorktown's first strike included 17 SBD-3's from VB-3 led by Lieutenant Commander M. F. Leslie. Approximately an hour after launch, VB-3's aircraft sighted the Japanese Fleet and commenced their dive-bombing attack; the primary target was the carrier Sōryū. Lieutenant (jg) Paul A. Holmberg was the first to drop his 1,000 pounder on the Sōryū. His hit was followed by two more from VB-3's SBDs. Sōryū erupted into flames and eventually sank. With the Sōryū in flames, the other VB-3 SBDs directed their attack against other targets. They attacked a destroyer, the Isokaze, making one hit on her fantail and "what appeared to be a battleship," claiming a hit on her stern. All 17 SBDs from VB-3 escaped the attack without a hit and returned to the Yorktown. Prior to landing on the carrier, they were directed to leave the area due to incoming enemy aircraft. All VB-3’s SBDs landed on Enterprise except for Lieutenant Commander Leslie and his wingman, Lieutenant (jg) Holmberg. These two men, low on fuel, ditched their aircraft alongside the USS Astoria and were picked up by the ship’s motor whaleboat. The battle was still not over for VB-3. In late afternoon, 14 of VB-3’s SBDs were launched from Enterprise as part of a strike group ordered to attack the fourth carrier Hiryū. Lieutenant Shumway was in charge of VB-3’s formation. The strike force located Hiryū and again caught a Japanese carrier in the vulnerable position of having armed and fueled planes on deck. Direct hits from Shumway’s SBD’s resulted in a torched Hiryū and her eventual sinking. Several of VB-3’s aircraft suffered heavy damage from attacking Japanese aircraft. However, all but two of VB-3’s aircraft returned to Enterprise. Seventeen of VB-3’s pilots received the Navy Cross for their action during the Battle of Midway, they were Ensigns Benson, Butler, Campbell, Cobb, Cooner, Elder, Hanson, Isaman, Lane, Merrill and Schoegel; Lieutenant (jg)s Holmberg, Sherwood and Wiseman; Lieutenants Bottomley and Shumway; and Lieutenant Commander Leslie.
- August 1942: While operating from USS Saratoga in the South Pacific, the squadron participated in strikes against Guadalcanal and other enemy installations in the Solomon Islands in support of the Guadalcanal Campaign.
- 24 August 1942: VB-3 participated in the Battle of the Eastern Solomons, attacking the Japanese light carrierRyūjō, and helping to sink her. Jan–Jul 1943: VB-3 operated in the South Pacific flying combat sorties against various Japanese-held islands and providing air cover for American forces.
- July 1943: VB-3 and the Saratoga Air Group were relieved by Air Group 12 and boarded HMS Victorious for transfer to CONUS to reform, arriving at San Diego on 18 August. This ended the air group and VB-3’s association with Saratoga.
- November 1944: VB-3 conducted combat operations from USS Yorktown against various targets, including shipping, in support of the Leyte invasion.
- January 1945: Combat operations were conducted against targets in Formosa and the Philippines in support of the Invasion of Lingayen Gulf. With Yorktown leading the way, Task Force 38 entered the South China Sea on 10 January. VB-3 struck targets near Saigon and along the Vietnamese coast, Canton and Hong Kong areas, Formosa and Okinawa.
- February 1945: VB-3 participated in the first carrier strikes against the Tokyo area, bombing the Kasumiga-ura Airfield, an air depot 25 miles north of Tokyo, and the Tachikawa Aircraft Engine Plant, located 16 miles west of the Imperial Palace. Following these strikes, the squadron concentrated its attention on air support for the Battle of Iwo Jima. This operation was the last combat action for the squadron during World War II. On 6 March, the squadron transferred from Yorktown to USS Lexington for transfer to the US.

=== Korean War ===
- 11 October 1950: While deployed to the Korean theater aboard USS Leyte, the squadron launched its first combat mission since February 1945, striking North Korean targets.
- 12 December 1950: The squadron's commanding officer, Lieutenant Commander Bagwell, crash-landed in North Korea and was taken prisoner.

=== Cold War ===
- July–August 1958: VA-35, along with other squadrons from CVG-3, provided support for U.S. Marines landing in Lebanon.
- October–November 1962: VA-35 deployed to McCalla Field, Guantanamo Bay, Cuba, during the Cuban Missile Crisis. During December, the squadron was embarked on USS Saratoga.
- 4 February 1965: The squadron's commanding officer, Commander Richard G. Layser, was killed in an accident.
- 15 August 1965: VA-35 transferred from CVW-3 in preparation for its transition to the A-6A Intruder. This brought to a close an illustrious career with CVW-3 that began in 1939.

=== Vietnam War ===
- 26 February 1967: The squadron participated in the first combat aerial mining operations since World War II, when its A-6A Intruders dropped mines in the Song Ca and Song Giang Rivers of North Vietnam.
- 1 October 1967: During a weapons training deployment to NAS Yuma, Arizona, VA-35 became the first A-6A squadron to fire the AIM-9 Sidewinder missile.
- January–February 1968: While embarked on USS Enterprise and en route to Yankee Station, the carrier was ordered to the Sea of Japan for operations following the seizure of the USS Pueblo by the North Koreans.
- 12 March 1968: The squadron's commanding officer, Commander Kollmann, along with his bombardier-navigator Lieutenant John G. Griffith, was lost in an operational accident.
- 17 September 1972: While on a mission over North Vietnam the squadron's Commanding Officer, CDR Verne Donnelly and Admin Officer, LCDR Ken Buell were lost. CDR Donnelly's remains have been found. LCDR Buell is still listed as missing in action.

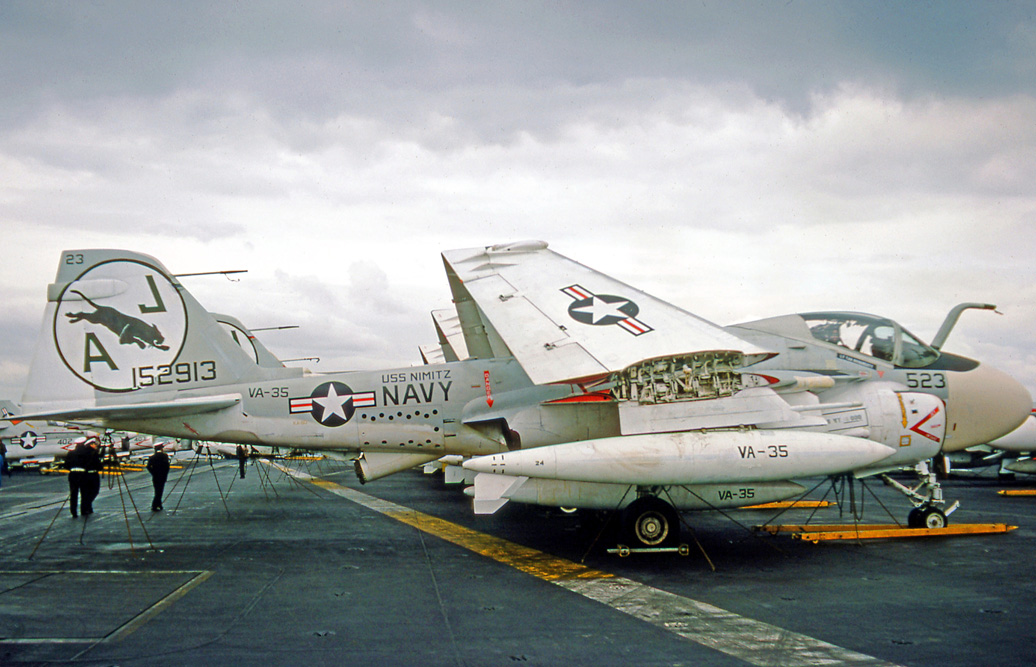
VA-35 Grumman KA-6D Intruder aboard USS Nimitz during a visit to Scotland in 1975. The Black Panther marking is displayed on the fin

=== Post Vietnam ===
- 3 January 1980: VA-35 departed Naples, Italy, embarked on USS Nimitz, en route to the Indian Ocean via the Cape of Good Hope after the U.S. Embassy staff was taken hostage in Tehran, Iran. This was the beginning of 144 consecutive days at sea for the squadron.
- 26 May 1981: While on a training exercise aboard Nimitz off the coast of Charleston, S.C., an EA-6B from VMAQ-2 crashed into parked aircraft while attempting to land. VA-35 personnel provided firefighting support and assistance to the injured. There was one injury to VA-35 personnel, from the Va-35 line crew. Over 130 members of the squadron received awards for fighting fires and assisting the injured.
- June 1985: Nimitz and VA-35 were ordered to operate off the coast of Lebanon due to the hijacking of TWA Flight 847. The carrier and squadron remained on station until the release of the hostages in the latter part of June.
- February 1987: VA-35, embarked on Nimitz, operated off the coast of Lebanon after three U.S. citizens were taken hostage from the American University in Beirut.
- July 1988: VA-35 participated in a firepower demonstration for the Chairman of the Joint Chiefs of Staff and his guest, the Marshal of the Soviet Union.
- September 1988: While deployed to the North Atlantic aboard USS Theodore Roosevelt, the squadron conducted flight operations from the carrier while in the Vestfjorden of Norway.
- August 1990–March 1991: The squadron flew missions in support of Operation Desert Shield, the build-up of American and Allied forces to counter a threatened invasion of Saudi Arabia by Iraq and part of an economic blockade of Iraq to force its withdrawal from Kuwait. The squadron then participated in Operation Desert Storm, the drive to push Iraqi forces out of Kuwait.
- 31 January 1995: The squadron was disestablished after over 60 years of service.

== Home port assignments ==
The squadron was assigned to these home ports, effective on the dates shown:

- NAS Norfolk – 1 July 1934
- NAS San Diego – 14 April 1935
- NAS Ford Island* – January 1942
- NAS Kaneohe Bay* – February 1942
- NAS Ewa* – June 1942
- NAS Kaneohe Bay* – September 1942
- Nandi Field, Fiji Islands* – November 1942
- Tontouta Airfield, New Caledonia* – December 1942
- NAS Sand Point – September 1943
- NAS Whidbey Island – October 1943
- NAS Pasco – 2 February 1944
- NAS Alameda* – 5 April 1944
- NAS Puunene* – 22 April 1944
- NAS Hilo* – 7 June 1944
- NAS Kahului* – 22 July 1944
- NAS Seattle – 28 March 1945
- NAS Wildwood – 7 May 1945
- NAAS Oceana – 19 July 1945
- NAAS Charlestown – 15 April 1947
- NAS Quonset Point – 14 August 1947
- NAAS Charlestown – 1 October 1947
- NAS Quonset Point – 1 February 1949
- NAAS Oceana – 24 August 1950
- NAS Quonset Point – 3 Feb 1951
- NAAS Sanford – 30 April 1951
- NAS Cecil Field – February 1953
- NAS Jacksonville – 1 October 1958
- NAS Oceana – August 1965

* Temporary shore base assignment during World War II.

== Aircraft assignment ==
The squadron first received the following aircraft in the months shown:

- BM-1 and BM-2 – Jul 1934
- BG-1 – Nov 1934
- SB2U-2 – Jan 1938
- SB2U-1 – Jul 1940
- BT-1 – Mar 1941
- SBC-4 – Mar 1941
- SBD-3 – Aug 1941
- SBD-4 – Apr 1943
- SBD-3P – Apr 1943
- SBD-5 – Aug 1943
- SB2C-1C – Dec 1943
- SBW-3 – Jul 1944
- SB2C-4 – Sep 1944
- SB2C-5 – Jan 1946
- AD-2 – 24 Nov 1948
- AD-2Q – Feb 1949
- AD-1 – Feb 1949
- AD-4 – Oct 1950
- AD-3 – May 1950
- AD-4L – Feb 1951
- AD-4B – Mar 1953
- AD-4N – Aug 1953
- AD-6/A-1H – Sep 1953
- AD-5 – Oct 1954
- A-6A – 15 Dec 1965
- A-6B – Jan 1968
- KA-6D – Dec 1970
- A-6C – Feb 1971
- A-6E – 19 Apr 1973

== See also ==
- Attack aircraft
- History of the United States Navy
- List of inactive United States Navy aircraft squadrons
