= VF-194 =

US Navy squadron

Fighter Squadron 194
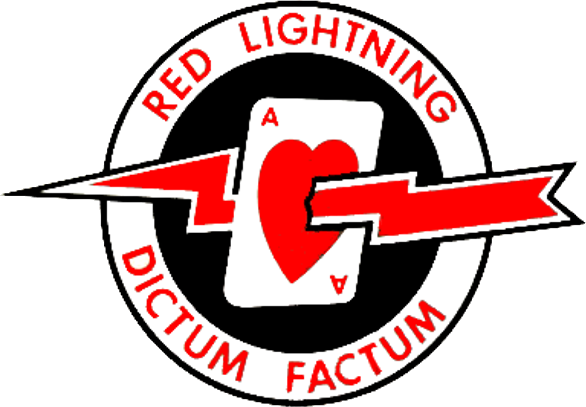
- VF-194 insignia
- Active: 26 March 1952 – 1 March 1978
- Country: United States
- Branch: United States Navy
- Type: fighter squadron
- Nickname(s): "Red Lightnings"
- Engagements: Korean War; Vietnam War

Fighter Squadron 194 (VF-194) was an aviation unit of the United States Navy. It was originally established as VF-91 on 26 March 1952, redesignated VF-194 on 1 August 1963 and disestablished on 1 March 1978. It was the third US Navy squadron to be designated VF-194.

== Squadron lineage ==
The US Navy does not recognize the tradition of squadrons once they have been disestablished. Therefore, even if there is a squadron with the same designation and nickname, it is officially a totally new squadron. Four different squadrons have been designated VF-194 since 1948, VF-194 Main Battery (1950–1955), VF-194 Yellow Devils (1955–1958), VF-194 Red Lightnings (1952–1978) and VF-194 Red Lightnings (1986–8), this page is focussed on the third VF-194.

=== Operational history ===
VF-91 was established on 26 March 1952 and equipped with the Grumman F9F-2 Panther. The squadron was assigned to Carrier Air Group 9 (CVG-9) and made its first deployment on USS Philippine Sea from December 1952 to August 1953 to Korea and the Western Pacific.

In 1954 the squadron exchanged their Panthers for the swept wing Grumman F9F-6 Cougar. Between 11 May 1954 and 12 December 1954 VF-91 circumnavigated the world aboard USS Hornet. From February to June 1956 VF-91 made its next deployment on USS Kearsarge as part of CVG-5, this time equipped with the F9F-8 Cougar.

The F9F-8s were replaced by the North American FJ-3 Fury in 1957 and the squadron made a Western Pacific cruise aboard USS Ticonderoga (CVA-14) between September 1957 and April 1958.

In 1959 VF-91 transitioned to the Vought F-8C Crusader and made three deployments aboard USS Ranger between 1960 and 1963.

On 1 August 1963 VF-91 was redesignated VF-194 and reassigned to Carrier Air Wing Nineteen. Between 1964 and 1973 VF-194 made eight deployments to the Vietnam War, two aboard USS Bon Homme Richard (1964, 1965/66), two aboard USS Ticonderoga (1966/67, 1967/68) and the last four aboard USS Oriskany. During these deployments the squadron flew the F-8E from 1965 to 1968 and then the F-8J. After the end of the US involvement in Vietnam in 1973, VF-194 made another two cruises to the Western Pacific aboard Oriskany. VF-194 and its sister squadron VF-191 were the last US Navy fighter squadrons equipped with the F-8 Crusader.

When USS Oriskany was retired as the last active Essex-class aircraft carrier, VF-194 received the McDonnell Douglas F-4J Phantom in 1976. Together with VF-191 the squadron was reassigned to Carrier Air Wing Fifteen. However, after only one deployment aboard USS Coral Sea the squadron was disestablished on 1 March 1978.

== Gallery ==
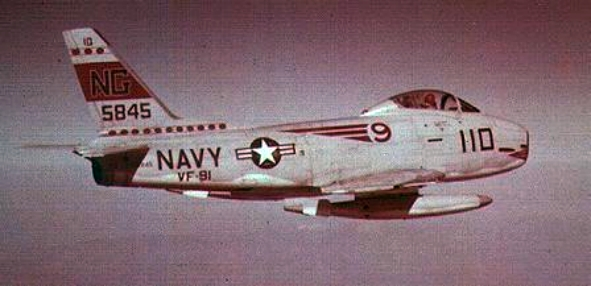
An FJ-3 of VF-91 in 1957

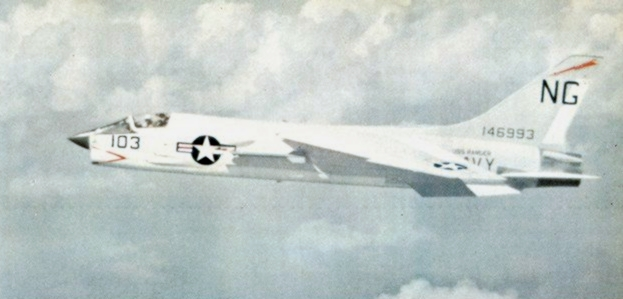
An F-8C of VF-91 from USS Ranger in 1962

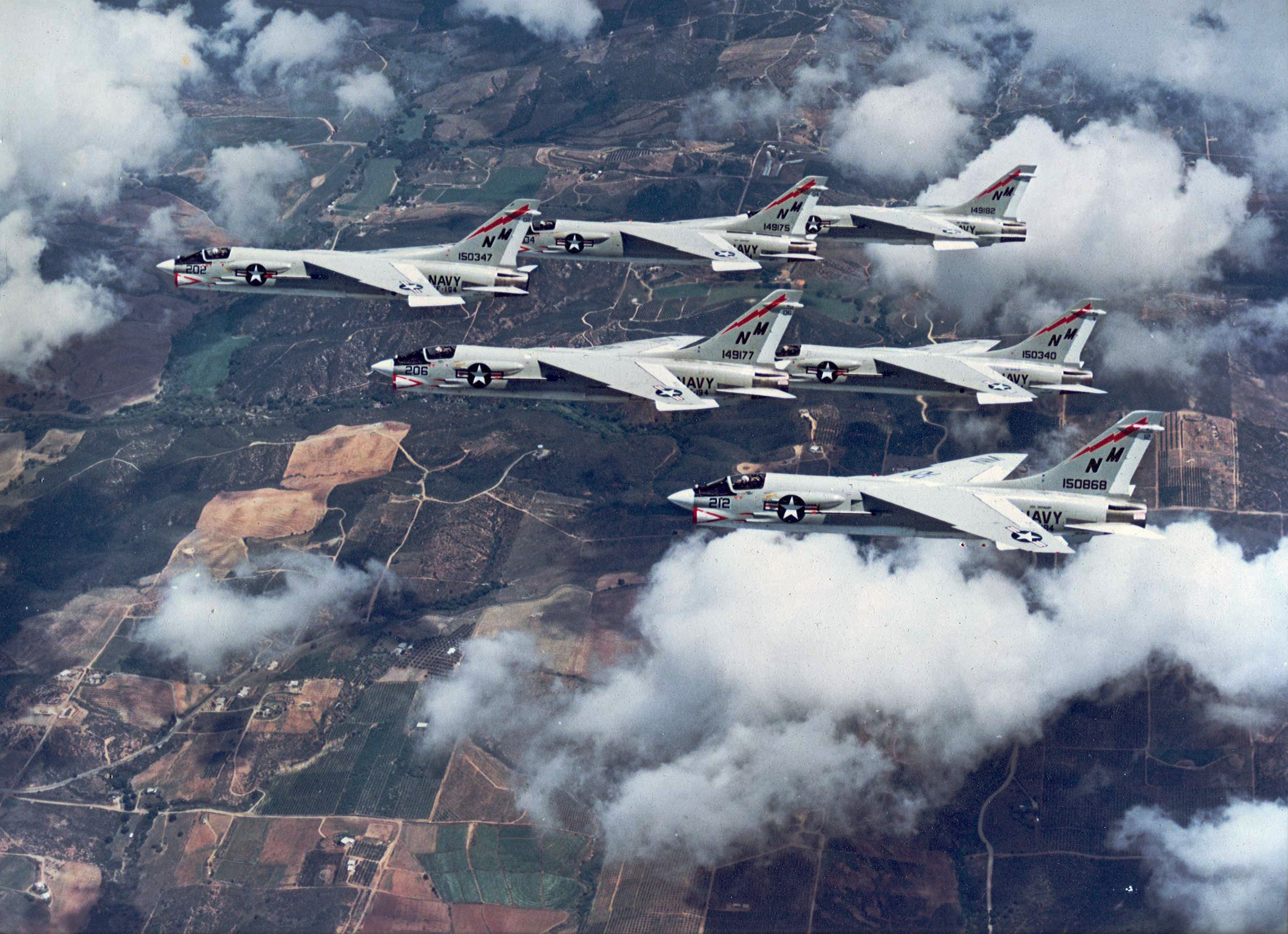
F-8Js of VF-194 in 1971

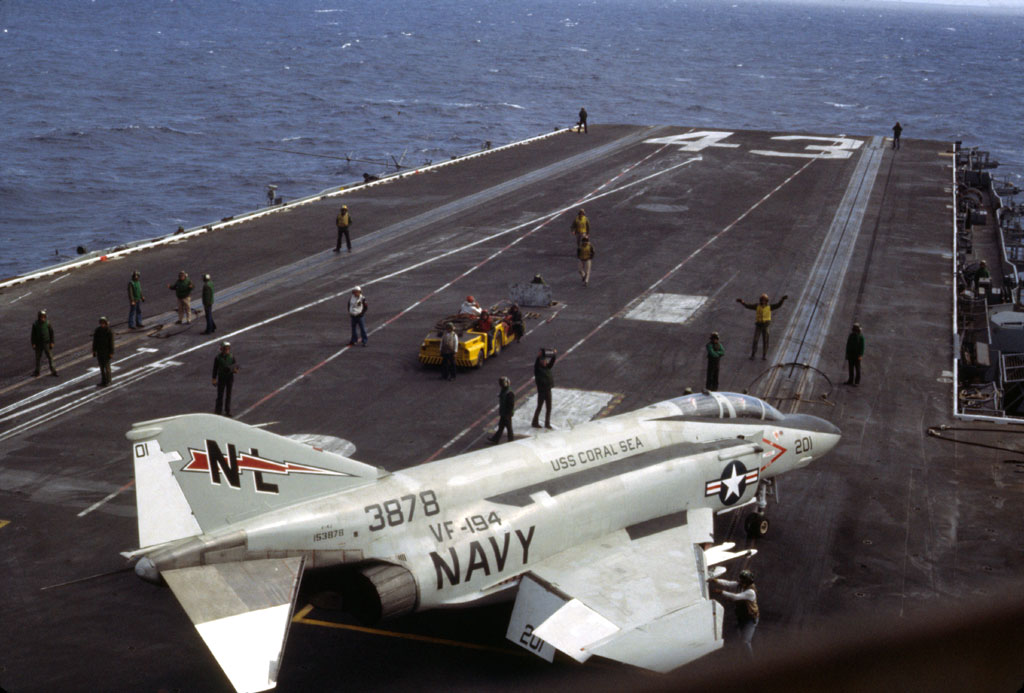
An F-4J of VF-194 on USS Coral Sea in 1977

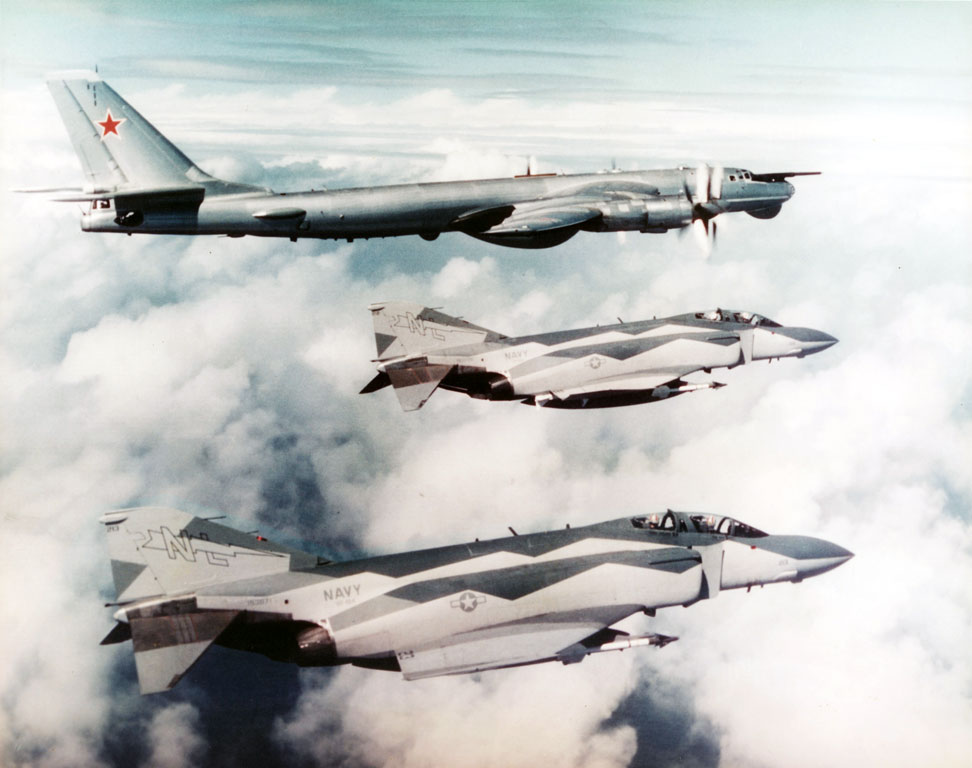
F-4Js intercepting a Soviet Tu-95 in 1977

== See also ==
- History of the United States Navy
- List of inactive United States Navy aircraft squadrons
- List of United States Navy aircraft squadrons
