= Gate (hydraulic engineering) =

In hydraulic engineering, a gate is a rotating or sliding structure, supported by hinges or by a rotating horizontal or vertical axis, that can be located at an extreme of a large pipe or canal in order to control the flow of water or any fluid from one side to the other. It is usually placed at the mouth of irrigation channels to avoid water loss or at the end of drainage channels to elude water entrance.

== Gate Valve ==
When using a gate, one thing that is used in certain applications such as manufacturing, mining, and others is the gate valve.

Fluids will run through the valve to help lubricate the moving parts of a machine, transmit power, close off openings to moving parts, and to assist evaporating the amount of heat coming through. These fluids will flow throughout the gate valve with little resistance to flow and there are additionally small drops in pressure. Within the gate valve, there is a gatelike disk that moves up and down perpendicular to the path of flow and seats against two seat faces to shut off flow.

== Limitations ==
The velocity of the fluid against a partly opened disk may cause vibration and chattering which will ultimately lead to damage to the seating surfaces. This is a common way that gate valves fail.

== See also ==
- Sluice
- Hydraulic containment
