= Nebraska Ordnance Plant =

Former American ammunitions plant)

Coordinates: 41.174°N 96.459°W

The Nebraska Ordnance Plant is a former United States Army ammunition plant located approximately ½ mile south of Mead, Nebraska and 30 miles west of Omaha, Nebraska in Saunders County. It originally extended across 17,250 acres (69.8 km^{2}) producing weapons from 1942-45 after which the Army used it as a bomb factory during the Vietnam War. Environmental investigations in the 1980's found the soil and groundwater contaminated with the explosive RDX and the degreaser trichloroethylene. In 1990, federal agencies added the site to the National Priorities List as a Superfund site. Remediation included soil excavation and water treatment, the latter of which has been ongoing since 1997. Water is contained and treated at 4 treatment plants and the known plumes are monitored at hundreds of wells. The latest wells, dug deeper into the bedrock than previously, showed RDX and TCE above desired action levels in April 2016.

== Description ==
The former Nebraska Ordnance Plant is one of Nebraska's 5 major ammunition plants: the Cornhusker Ordnance Plant, the Sioux Army Depot, the Hastings Naval Ammunition Depot and the Martin Bomber Plant. It stretches over 17,250 acres of nearly flat terrain about half a mile south of the village Mead, Nebraska and 30 miles west of Omaha, Nebraska in Saunders County. Rain water drains to the southwest toward Silver Creek, Nebraska on the plants western part, and on its eastern portion to the south-southeast, toward Johnson Creek, Nebraska, Clear Creek, Nebraska, and the 'Lower Platte North Natural Resource District Reservoir'. The ground consists of sand and gravel deposits, and beyond 30 feet below the surface of sandstone. The groundwater generally flows south-southeast toward the Platte River Valley and is used as drinking water and for agriculture.

As of 2016 the University of Nebraska–Lincoln owns 8,650 acres on which it maintains an agricultural research and development center. The Department of Defense owns a portion used by the Nebraska National Guard and Army Reserves and the remainder is private property.

== History ==
=== Army use, 1942-1962 ===
The site started producing bombs, boosters, and shells in 1942 during World War II. It consisted of four bomb load lines, an explosive booster assembly plant, an ammonium nitrate plant, two explosives burning areas, a proving ground, a landfill, a wastewater treatment plant, analytical laboratories, and storage and administration facilities.

From 1942-1945 the Nebraska Defense Corporation operated the site for the Army. Ammunitions were loaded with trinitrotoluene (TNT), amatol (TNT and ammonium nitrate), tritonal (TNT and aluminum), and Composition B ( RDX and TNT). A 1943 article said that the Firestone Company operated the plant for the Army.

From 1950-1956, the plant was reactivated and produced weapons for the Korean War. In 1959 it was declared "excess to Army needs" and was transferred to the General Services Administration. The National Guard and Army Reserve retained roughly 1,000 acres for training, the Army used 12 acres as a Nike Missile maintenance area, and the United States Air Force built the Offutt Air Force Base Atlas Missile site on 2,000 acres. The Department of Commerce received 40 acres.

From 1959 to 1960, the Air Force built the "Atlas missile Area (AMA) site S-1 launch area" [sic] or shorter "Nike Area" on 1,185 acres north of bomb load line 4. The Air Force also used 34 acres of the northern bomb load line 1 as "Ballistic Missile Division Technical Area". In 1964, both were decommissioned and transferred to the Nebraska National Guard.

As of 2016, there are four contaminated groundwater plumes, each 2 to 3 miles long and 200 feet to half a mile wide.

=== Civilian, 1962-present ===
In 1962, the University of Nebraska–Lincoln bought about 9,600 acres, followed by 600 acres in 1964, to use it as a farm for agricultural research on crop, swine, dairy, and cattle, the Agricultural Research and Development Center. Private individuals and corporations bought the remainder 5,250 acres. Adjacent land is used primarily agricultural.

During the late 1970s and early '80s, the university buried hazardous waste low-level radioactive medical wastes and solvents in trenches and a landfill. Some areas were used to rinse pesticides off machinery.

=== Environmental investigations, 1980's- present time ===
Environmental investigations in the 1980's found the soil and groundwater contaminated with RDX and TCE. On August 30, 1990 the former plant was listed as a superfund site on the National Priorities List of CERCLA. In September 1991, the Kansas City District Corps of Engineers, the EPA, and Nebraska Department of Environmental Quality entered into an interagency agreement to investigate and control environmental contamination. Cleanup activities were organized into three operable units (OUs) as follows: the upper four feet of soil contaminated with explosive compounds (OU1), groundwater and soil contaminated with volatile organic compounds and explosive compounds, which was not remediated during OU1 and could contaminate the groundwater with explosive compounds (OU2) and miscellaneous emerging areas of waste that had not previously been identified (OU3). OU5 consists of areas on University property.

The ATSDR produced a "Health assessment" in 1992, classifying the site as a public health hazard, "because a risk to human health may exist from possible exposure to hazardous substances at concentrations that may result in adverse human health effects. Individuals could have skin contact and ingestion exposures to RDX, TNT, and polychlorinated biphenyls in on-site soils". The site was not considered for follow-up health activities because in the ATSDR opinion "no current exposure was occurring at levels of public health concern". In 2004, local residents complained that "regulators were dragging their feet in getting private wells sampled and were accused of not providing accurate and timely information to the public".

In spring 2016, three new clusters of monitoring wells dug deeper into the bedrock aquifer than previously were installed at the south end of the known plumes, and showed RDX and TCE above the action levels. Of the 75 household water wells which have been tested as of May 2016, only 3 household wells have contaminants above the defined safe drinking water levels.

== Remediation, 1991–present ==
Remediation for OU1 consisted of soil excavation from 5 up to 30 feet deep and on-site thermal treatment, which was completed in 1999. Incineration of 16,449 tons of explosives-contaminated soil was done from October - December 1998.

It was not until 1997 that a Record of Decision for OU2 was signed; Groundwater remediation (OU2) began 1998 with hydraulic containment and focused extraction wells; As of 2008 there were 11 extraction wells for containment and one extraction well for focused extraction. Four groundwater treatment plants have been operating, two use air stripping, one the Advanced Oxidation Process, and the fourth uses an activated carbon filter. Four times a year, water is sampled from some of the over 300 monitoring wells and from surface water. Together with wells by other agencies in the surrounding area over 500 wells can be chosen for regional measurements semi-annually. The water level data are displayed on maps which show plume flow across the area over time.

For OU3, the final investigation was completed in 2011 and in April 2013 the involved parties signed a "No Further Action" Record of Decision.

The water treatment system depends on Platte River flow, which if it was going dry and remaining dry year after year, would need to be changed.

OU5 was started to be cleaned up in 2007, and in September 2013, the EPA selected in situ chemical oxidation as a remedy.

== See also ==
- List of Superfund sites in Nebraska
