= Peter G. Burbules =

United States Army general

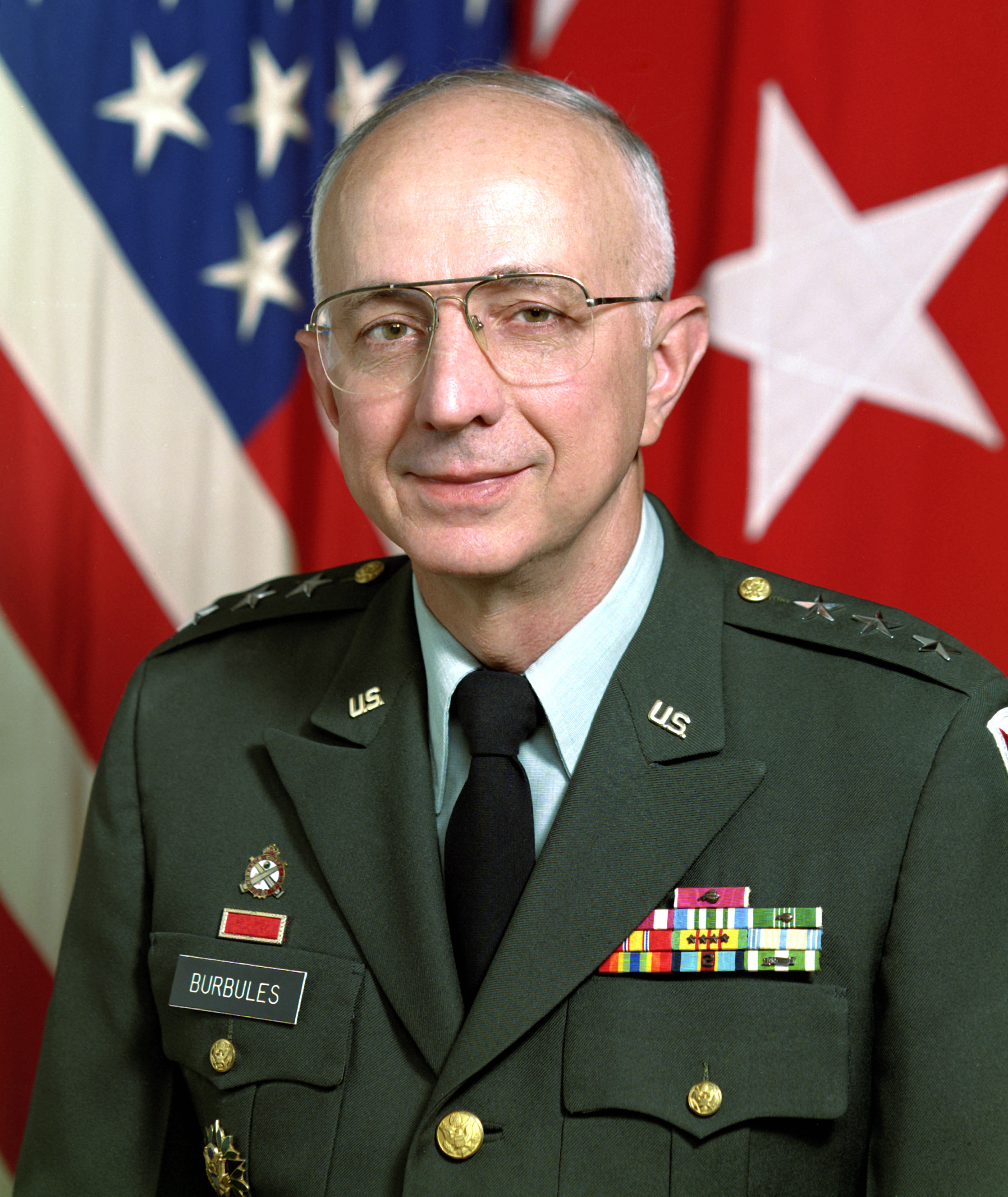
- Born: 29 November 1931 (age 94); Chicago, Illinois U.S.
- Military career
- Allegiance: United States
- Branch: United States Army
- Service years: 1952–1987
- Rank: Lieutenant general
- Commands: U.S. Army Missile Command; Deputy commanding general, Army Materiel Command

Lieutenant General Peter George Burbules (was born of Greek immigrants on 29 November 1931) is a retired US Army general who received the Distinguished Service Medal and the Legion of Merit (with Oak Leaf Cluster)and was inducted into the U.S. Army Ordnance Hall of Fame.

== Education ==
Burbules is a 1950 graduate of Chicago Vocational School, where he studied architectural drafting. In 1962, he received a bachelor's degree in military science under the Bootstrap Program at the University of Omaha. Burbules also earned a master's degree in business administration from Babson College in 1970. In addition, he graduated from the U.S. Army Ordnance School, the U.S. Armed Forces Staff College in 1971, and the Naval War College in 1976. General Burbules began his military career as an enlisted man in 1952. After completing leadership training with the 7th Armored Division at Camp Roberts, California, he entered Officers Candidate School and was commissioned a second lieutenant in the Ordnance Corps in May 1954.

== Career ==
Burbules served in a variety of important career building assignments. Included were tours of duty at Fort Huachuca (1954 to 1957); Korea (1957 to 1958); the Defense Atomic Support Agency (1958 to 1961); Turkey (1962 to 1965); Vietnam (1967 to 1968); and as commander of the Cornhusker Army Ammunition Plant (1968 to 1969). From 1965 to 1967, he served in the project manager's Office, General Purpose Vehicles. General Burbules commanded the support battalion of the 172d Arctic Light Infantry Brigade in Alaska from 1971 to 1973. His next assignment was the Office of the Chief of Staff of the Army as a weapon system analyst (1973 to 1974), followed by a tour as the executive officer, Systems Review and Analysis Office, Office of the Deputy Chief of Staff for Research, Development and Acquisition, with concurrent duty as the executive secretary, Army Systems Acquisition Review Council. He also served as the chairman, Joint Fuze Task Group under the cognizance of the Joint Logistics Commanders from 1976 to 1977.

Other key assignments included commander, Tooele Army Depot, Utah, from 1977 to 1979; deputy commanding general for conventional ammunition, Army Armament Materiel Readiness Command, Rock Island, Illinois, from 1979 to 1982; deputy executive director for conventional ammunition, Army Materiel Development and Readiness Command (now U.S. Army Materiel Command) from February 1982 to October 1983; commanding general, Army Armament, Munitions, and Chemical Command, Rock Island, Illinois, from October 1983 to July 1985; commanding general of the U.S. Army Missile Command from 2 August 1985 to 12 May 1986; and deputy commanding general (materiel readiness), Army Materiel Command, from May 1986 until his retirement from active duty in October 1987.

== Awards ==
- Army Distinguished Service Medal
- Legion of Merit with oak leaf cluster
- Meritorious Service Medal
- Joint Service Commendation Medal
- Army Commendation Medal with oak leaf cluster

In 1992, he was inducted into the U.S. Army Ordnance Hall of Fame.
