= Garvey Elevator =

Grain storage facility in Nebraska, US

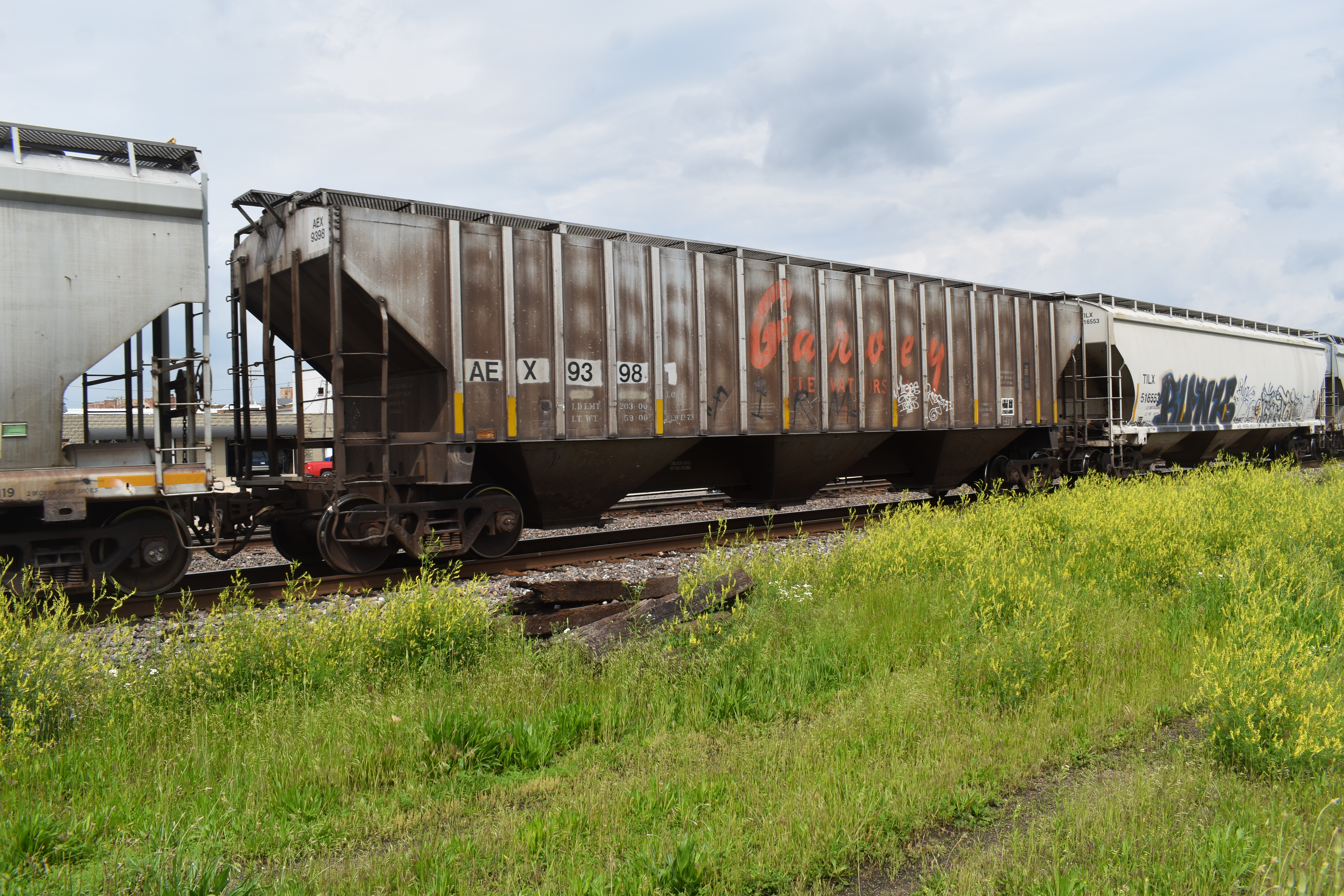
Hopper car from the Garvey Elevator

Garvey Grain elevator is a 22-acre grain storage facility located just south of Hastings, Nebraska. Garvey constructed, owned and operated a more than 8-million bushel grain storage facility on its property from 1959 until 1998. In 1998, Ag Processing Inc. took over operations. From 1959 to 1985, a grain fumigant consisting primarily of carbon tetrachloride, a volatile organic compound which is a significant hepatotoxin (substance toxic to the liver), was used which contaminated the soil and groundwater. It was proposed as a Superfund site on April 27, 2005, and it was listed by the United States Environmental Protection Agency on September 14, 2005.

== Superfund site ==
Garvey began cleanup in October 2005 but filed for Chapter 7 bankruptcy in March 2007.

The contamination created a plume of contaminated water approximately four miles long. In September 2016, the Environmental Protection Agency completed a remedial design for the groundwater recovery, treatment and discharge system. However, as of January 2021, the system still has not been constructed due to lack of government funding.

== See also ==
- List of Superfund sites in Nebraska
