= List of Superfund sites in Nebraska =

This is a list of Superfund sites in Nebraska designated under the Comprehensive Environmental Response, Compensation, and Liability Act (CERCLA) environmental law. The CERCLA federal law of 1980 authorized the United States Environmental Protection Agency (EPA) to create a list of polluted locations requiring a long-term response to clean up hazardous material contaminations. These locations are known as Superfund sites, and are placed on the National Priorities List (NPL). The NPL guides the EPA in "determining which sites warrant further investigation" for environmental remediation. As of March 26, 2010, there were 13 Superfund sites on the National Priorities List in Nebraska. No sites are currently proposed for entry on the list. One site has been cleaned up and removed from the list.

== Superfund sites ==
Deleted from National Priorities List

| CERCLIS ID | Name | County | Reason | Proposed | Listed | Construction completed | Partially deleted | Deleted |
|---|---|---|---|---|---|---|---|---|
| NED981713837 | 10th Street Site | Platte | Groundwater and soil contamination by VOCs from dry cleaning. | 10/26/1989 | 08/30/1990 | 06/22/2007 | – | – |
| NED981713829 | Bruno Co-op Association/Associated Properties | Butler | Groundwater contamination by VOCs used for grain fumigation. | 10/14/1992 | 06/17/1996 | 09/13/2005 | – | – |
| NED981499312 | Cleburn Street Well | Hall | Groundwater contaminated by PCE from solvent industry and dry cleaning. | 07/29/1991 | 10/14/1992 | 09/14/2004 | – | – |
| NE2213820234 | Cornhusker Army Ammunition Plant | Hall | Groundwater contamination by explosives, soil contamination by explosives and heavy metals. | 10/15/1984 | 07/22/1987 | – | – | – |
| NEN000704351 | Garvey Elevator | Adams | Groundwater and soil contamination by VOCs used for grain fumigation. | 04/27/2005 | 09/14/2005 | – | – | – |
| NED980862668 | Hastings Ground Water Contamination | Adams and Clay | Groundwater and soil contamination by VOCs, PAHs, explosives, other organics, and heavy metals, from several sources. | 10/15/1984 | 06/10/1986 | – | – | – |
| NED068645696 | Lindsay Manufacturing Co. | Platte | Groundwater and soil contamination by heavy metals and VOCs from industrial plant. | 10/15/1984 | 10/04/1989 | 08/03/1995 | – | – |
| NE6211890011 | Nebraska Ordnance Plant | Saunders | Groundwater contamination by VOCs and explosives; some soil contamination and possible unexploded ordnance. | 10/26/1989 | 08/30/1990 | – | – | – |
| NED986369247 | Ogallala Ground Water Contamination | Keith | Groundwater contamination by VOCs from electronics industry and dry cleaning. | 10/14/1992 | 12/16/1994 | 09/27/2006 | – | – |
| NESFN0703481 | Omaha Lead Site | Douglas | Soil contamination by lead from former refining plant. | 02/24/2002 | 04/30/2003 | – | – | – |
| NEN000704456 | Parkview Well | Hall | Groundwater contamination by VOCs. | 09/23/2004 | 04/19/2006 | – | – | – |
| NED084626100 | Sherwood Medical Company | Madison | Soil and groundwater contamination by VOCs. | 07/29/1991 | 10/14/1992 | 09/24/1999 | – | – |
| NEN000704738 | West Highway 6 & Highway 281 | Adams | Soil and groundwater contamination by VOCs from former Dana Holding Corporation plant. | 09/14/2005 | 04/19/2006 | – | – | – |
| NED980862718 | Waverly Ground Water Contamination | Lancaster | Groundwater and soil contamination by VOCs from grain fumigation, and nitrates, sulfates and heavy metals. | 10/15/1984 | 06/10/1986 | 03/29/1994 | – | 11/20/2006 |

== See also ==
- List of Superfund sites in the United States
- List of environmental issues
- List of waste types
- TOXMAP
