= VF-194 (1986–1988) =

US Navy aviation unit

Fighter Squadron 194
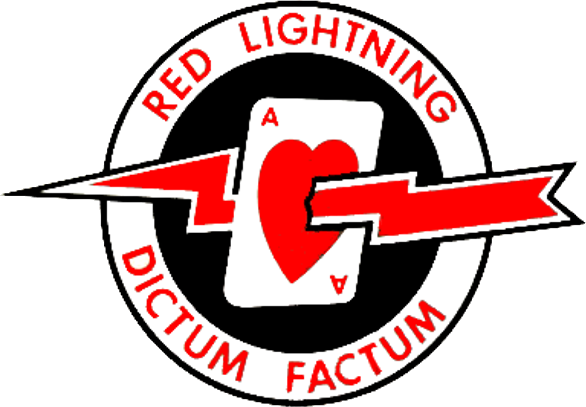
- VF-194 squadron insignia
- Active: 1 December 1986 – 30 April 1988
- Country: United States
- Branch: United States Navy
- Role: Fighter aircraft
- Part of: Inactive
- Nickname: Red Lightnings

Aircraft flown
- Fighter: F-14A Tomcat

Fighter Squadron 194 or VF-194 was a short-lived aviation unit of the United States Navy established on 1 December 1986 and disestablished on 30 April 1988. It was the fourth US Navy squadron to be designated VF-194.

== Operational history ==
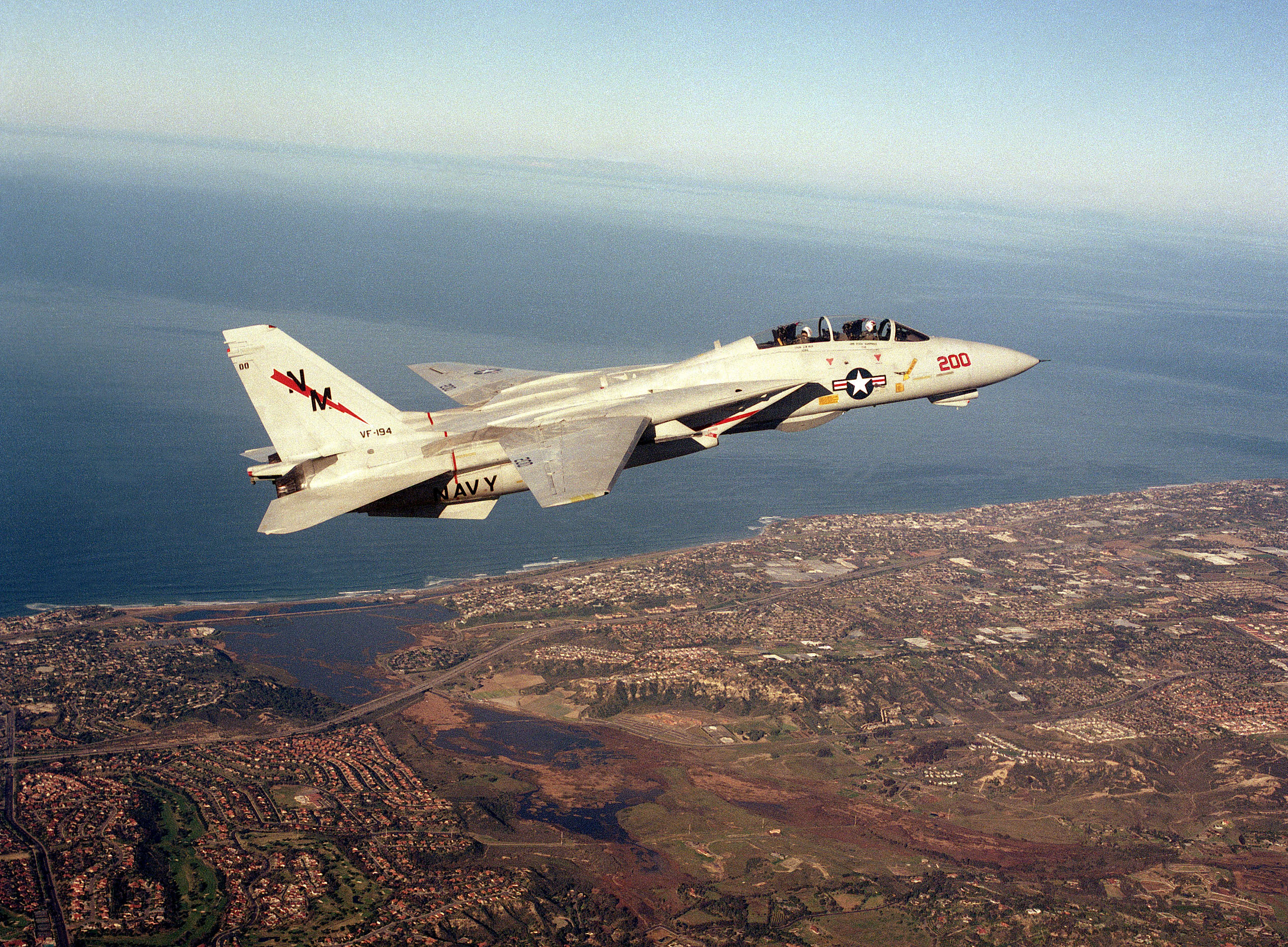
VF-194 F-14A in 1986

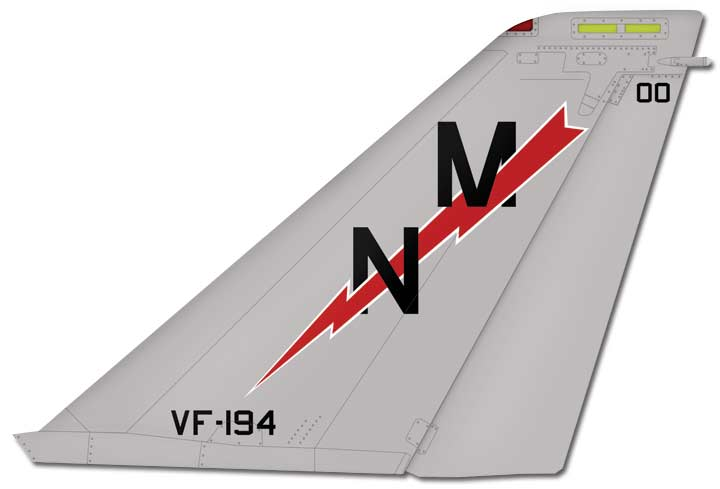
VF-194 F-14 tail markings

VF-194 adopted the unit name and insignia of the third VF-194. After training on the F-14A Tomcat with VF-124, and being due to deploy on board USS Independence as part of Carrier Air Wing 10, VF-191 was disestablished on 30 April 1988, before the cruise could take place.

In early 1992 the Navy planned to reactivate VF-194, along with VF-191, as the first two active F-14D Super-Tomcat squadrons. Initially planned to be based at NAS Miramar and part of Carrier Air Wing Fourteen, the idea was scrapped when Congress declined to upgrade the entire F-14 fleet to the D model and limited the F-14D purchase to 55 aircraft (28 new airframes and 27 re-manufactured F-14A airframes). Instead two east coast F-14A squadrons (VF-11 and VF-31) were chosen to transition to the F-14D, CVW-14 and NAS Miramar in late 1992.

== Home port assignments ==
- NAS Moffett Field

== Aircraft assignment ==
- F-14A Tomcat

== See also ==
- History of the United States Navy
- List of inactive United States Navy aircraft squadrons
- List of United States Navy aircraft squadrons
