= Hastings Naval Ammunition Depot, Nebraska =

Coordinates: 40°31′57.12″N 98°11′16.72″W

The Naval Ammunition Depot Hastings (NAD Hastings) near Hastings, Nebraska was the largest United States World War II naval munitions plant operating from 1942 to 1946 and produced over 40% of the U.S. Navy's munitions.

== History ==
=== World War II and accidents ===
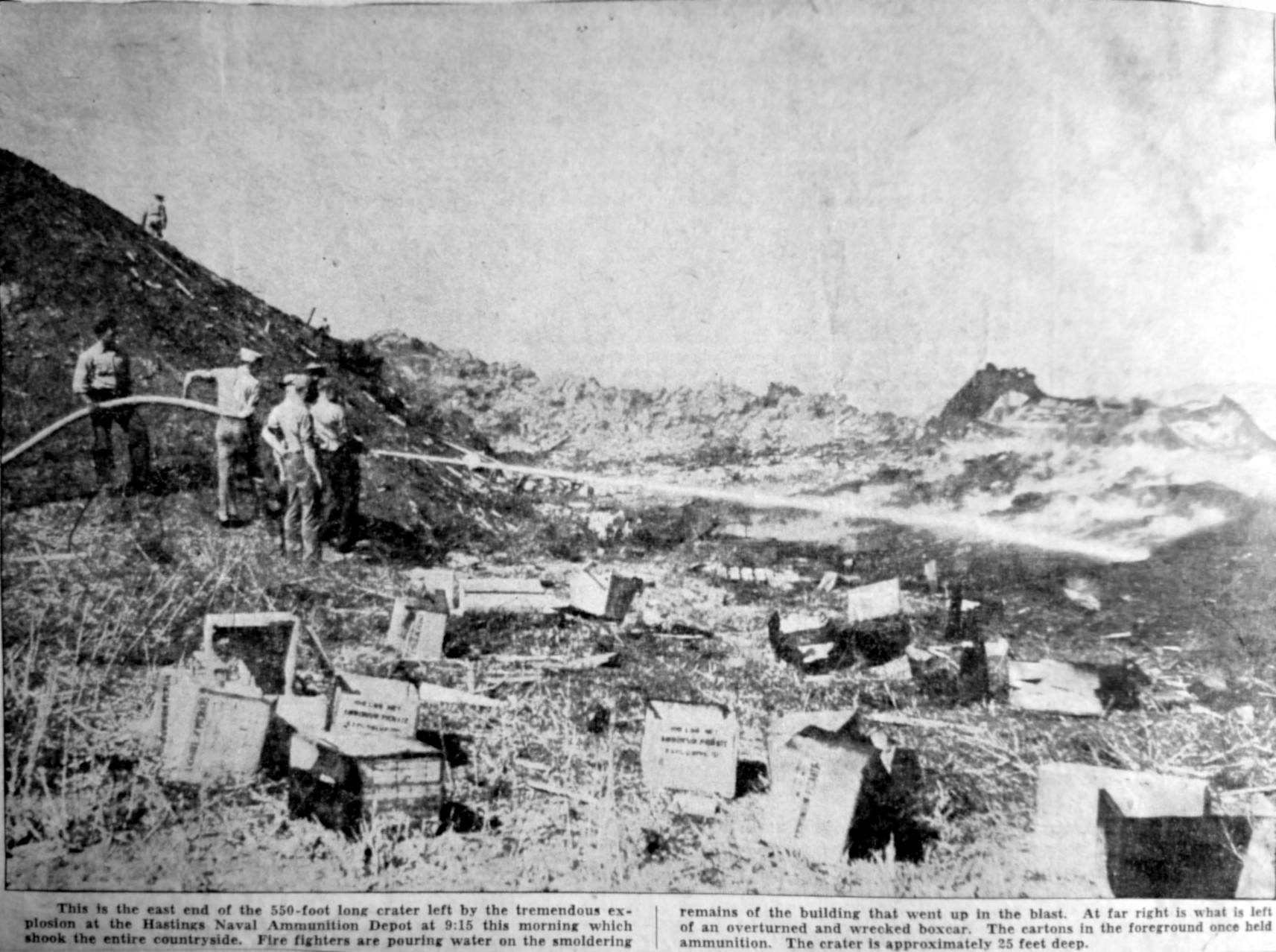

The former Naval Ammunition Depot (NAD) is one of Nebraska's four major former ammunition plants: the Cornhusker Ordnance Plant, the Nebraska Ordnance Plant and the Martin Bomber Plant. Its construction began in July 1942 on 49,000 acres (200 km^{2}) and was completed in early 1943 with over 2,000 buildings, bunkers, and various other types of structures. The cost of construction was over $71 million.

The Navy built in this location due to the proximity to the area's three railroads, the abundance of underground water, cheap natural gas and electricity, the stable work force, and the distance from either coast (being well beyond the range of Japanese or German bombers). At one point during World War II the facility was producing over 40% of the U.S. Navy's munitions. It manufactured 40 mm shells, 16-inch projectiles, rockets, bombs, depth charges, mines, and torpedoes. Production peaked in June–July 1945, when the depot employed 125 officers, 1,800 enlisted men, and 6,692 civilians.

The impact on the city of Hastings was a 40% population increase from just over 15,000 in 1940 to 22,252 at its peak during the war. By 1944, workers' base wages at the depot were 74 cents an hour with time-and-a-half for overtime beyond 54- to 64-hour workweeks, considerably higher than the 40- to 50-cents per hour in town and maybe a dollar a day for a hired man on the farm. Farmers experienced a severe labor shortage, schools were overcrowded with 50-60 children, and new homes were scarce.

Four accidental explosions took place during the war, of which two were officially reported. All occurred in 1944, and together resulted in the deaths of 22 people. The first accident left a crater 550 feet long, 220 feet wide, and 50 feet deep. The most severe accidental blast killed nine people and injured fifty-three on September 15, 1944. It was caused by human error while a train was being loaded. The loading depot and the train were totally destroyed. Part of the roof at a high school in Harvard, about 15 miles (24 km) east of Hastings, collapsed as a result of the explosion; injuring 10 children.

=== After World War II ===
In April 1945, the work week was reduced from 60 to 54 hours, and then in August 1945 to 40 hours while the number of employees was reduced to 3,000. By 1949, personnel numbered 1,189. The depot was reactivated in August 1950 to supply munitions for the Korean War. During this period, employment peaked in January 1954 with 2,946 civilians.

=== Air Force presence ===
During the Vietnam War, a portion of the NAD was turned over to the U.S. Air Force. This became a radar bomb scoring detachment that helped train pilots in electronic bombing techniques that were used in southeast Asia.

== Closure and transfer ==
Closure of the site was ordered in December 1958 to be concluded no later than June 1966. As of 2015, the land was occupied by Central Community College, which uses some of the former buildings, Hastings East Industrial Park (HEIP), a golf course, the Greenlief Training Facility for national guardsmen and reservists, and the United States Department of Agriculture Meat Animal Research Center, which was granted part of the site in 1964.

== Other naval munititions plants ==
Three smaller inland naval munitions plants were located at Naval Ammunition Depot, Crane in Burns City, Indiana, McAlester Naval Depot in McAlester, Oklahoma and the Hawthorne Naval Ammunition Depot in Hawthorne, Nevada.

== See also ==
- Lake Denmark Naval Ammunition Depot, New Jersey, which blew up in July 1926.
- List of accidents and incidents involving transport or storage of ammunition
