= VF-191 (1986–1988) =

Fighter Squadron 191
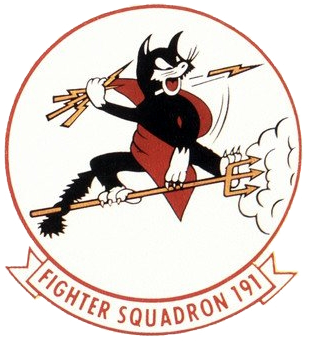
- VF-191 squadron insignia
- Active: 1 December 1986 – 30 April 1988
- Country: United States
- Branch: United States Navy
- Role: Fighter aircraft
- Part of: Inactive
- Nickname(s): Satan's Kittens

Aircraft flown
- Fighter: F-14A Tomcat

Fighter Squadron 191 or VF-191 was a short-lived aviation unit of the United States Navy established on 1 December 1986 and disestablished on 30 April 1988. It was the second US Navy squadron to be designated VF-191. VF-191 and sister squadron VF-194 were the two shortest-lived F-14 squadrons in history.

== Operational history ==
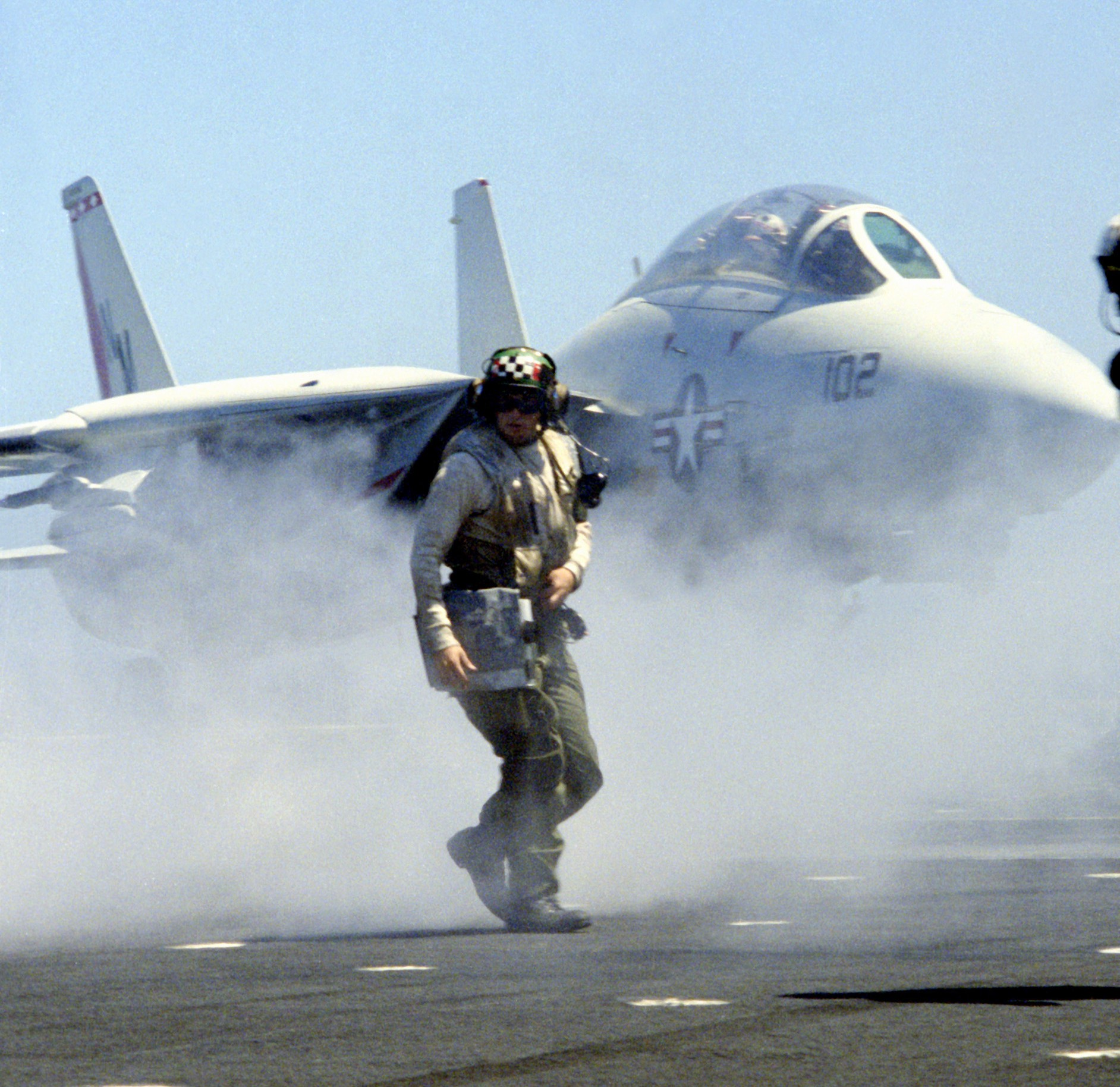
VF-191 F-14A on USS Enterprise in January 1988

VF-191 adopted the unit name and insignia of the original VF-191. After training on the F-14A Tomcat with VF-124, and being due to deploy on board USS Independence as part of Carrier Air Wing 10, VF-191 was disestablished on 30 April 1988, before the cruise could take place.

== Home port assignments ==
- NAS Miramar Field

== Aircraft assignment ==
- F-14A Tomcat

== See also ==
- History of the United States Navy
- List of inactive United States Navy aircraft squadrons
- List of United States Navy aircraft squadrons
