= VF-194 (1955–1958) =

Fighter Squadron 194
- Active: 18 May 1955 – 10 April 1958
- Country: United States
- Branch: United States Navy
- Role: Fighter aircraft
- Part of: Inactive
- Nickname(s): Yellow Devils

Aircraft flown
- Fighter: F2H-3 Banshee

Fighter Squadron 194 or VF-194 was a short-lived aviation unit of the United States Navy established on 18 May 1955 and disestablished on 10 April 1958. It was the second US Navy squadron to be designated VF-194.

== Operational history ==
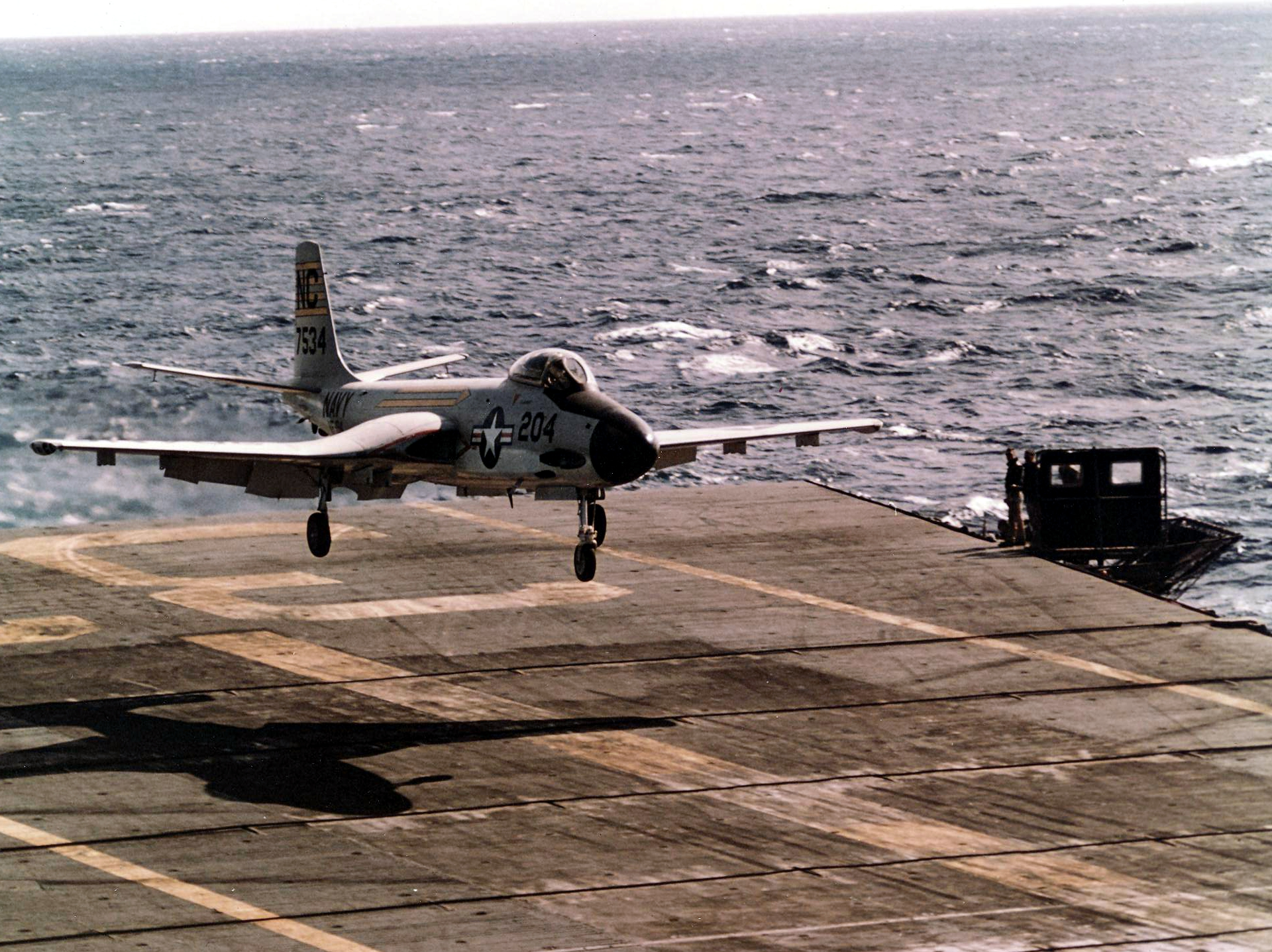
VF-194 F2H-3 lands on USS Kearsarge in 1958

VF-194 equipped with the F2H-3 Banshee was assigned to Air Task Group 3 (ATG-3) on USS Kearsarge for a Western Pacific deployment from 9 August 1957 to 2 April 1958. After the end of this deployment VF-194 and ATG-3 were disestablished on 10 April 1958.

== Home port assignments ==
- NAS Moffett Field

== Aircraft assignment ==
- F2H-3 Banshee

== See also ==
- History of the United States Navy
- List of inactive United States Navy aircraft squadrons
- List of United States Navy aircraft squadrons
