= VF-191 =

Fighter Squadron 191
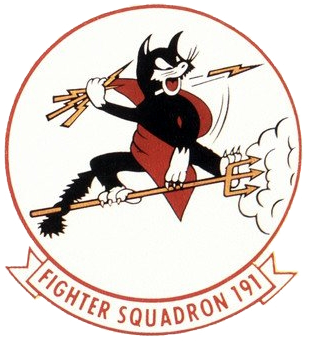
- VF-191 insignia
- Active: 15 August 1943 – 1 March 1978
- Country: United States
- Branch: United States Navy
- Type: fighter squadron
- Nickname(s): "Satan's Kittens"
- Engagements: World War II; Korean War; Vietnam War

Fighter Squadron 191 (VF-191) was an aviation unit of the United States Navy. It was established in 1943 and disestablished in 1978. The squadron was nicknamed Satan's Kittens. A second VF-191, bearing the same designation and nickname was established for a short time again between 1986 and 1988.

== History ==
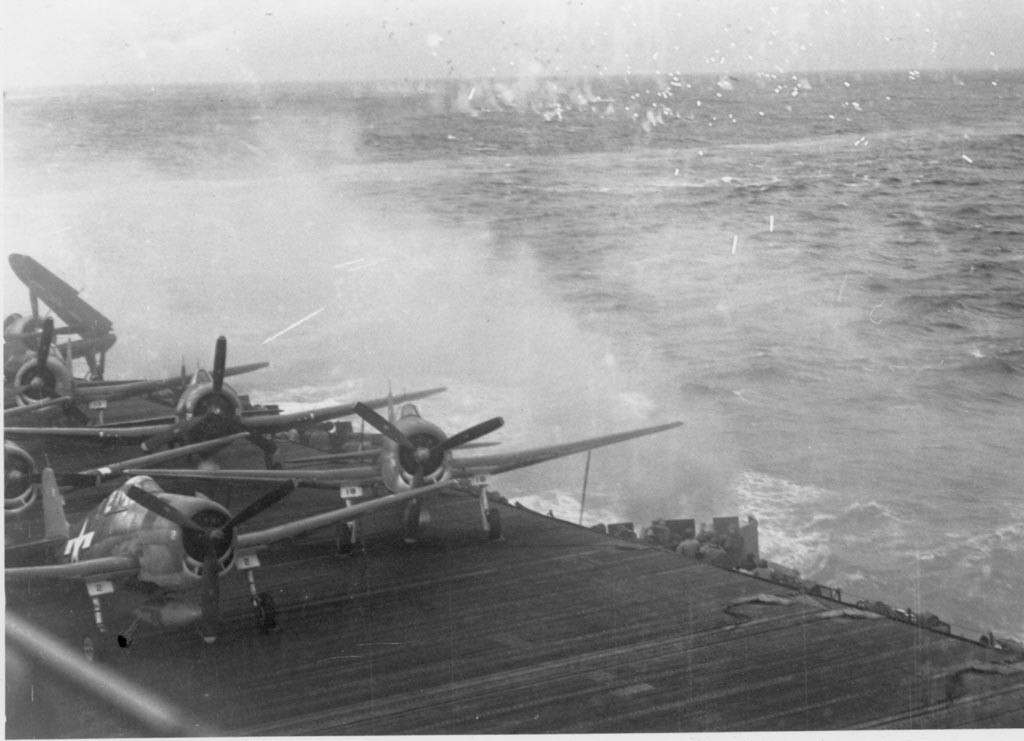
F6F-5s on the USS Lexington in 1944

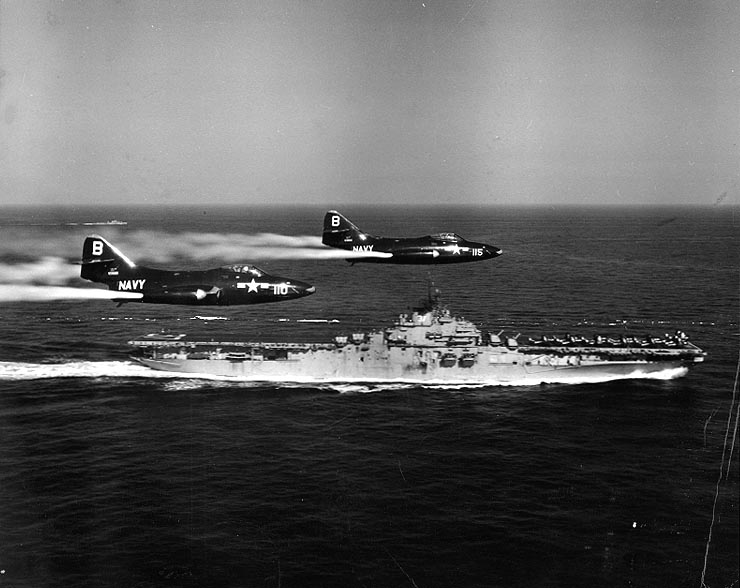
F9F-2s during the Korean War

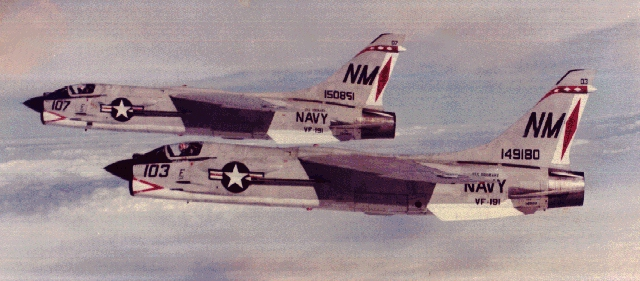
F-8Js from the USS Oriskany

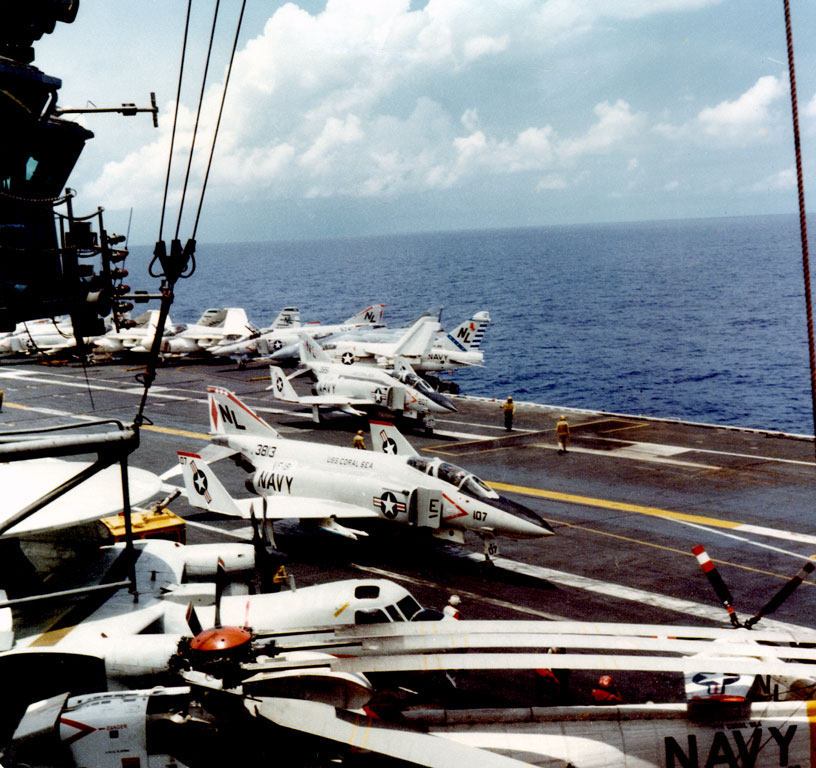
F-4J on the USS Coral Sea in 1977

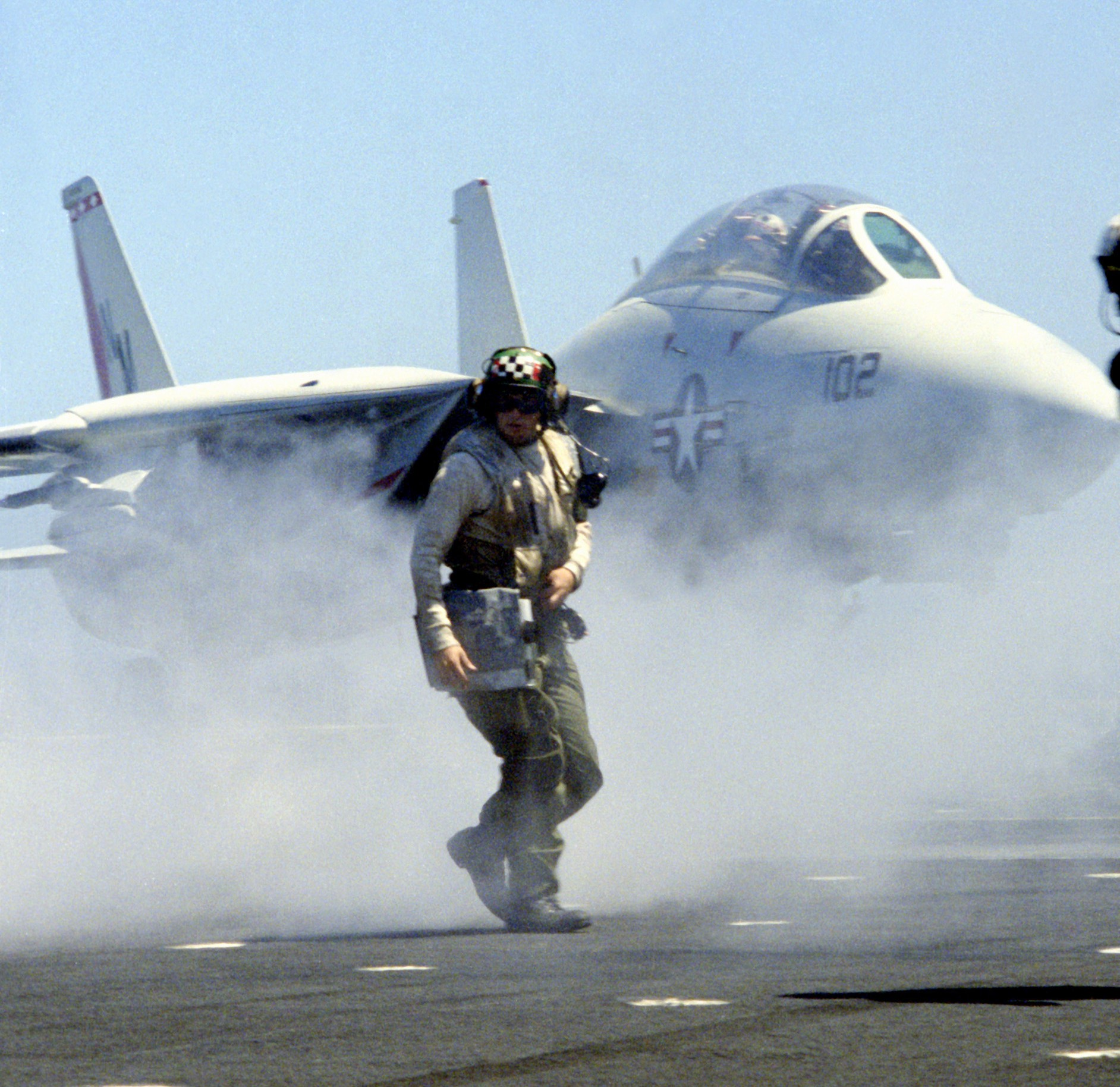
F-14 Tomcat of VF-191 aboard USS Enterprise (CVN-65) in 1988

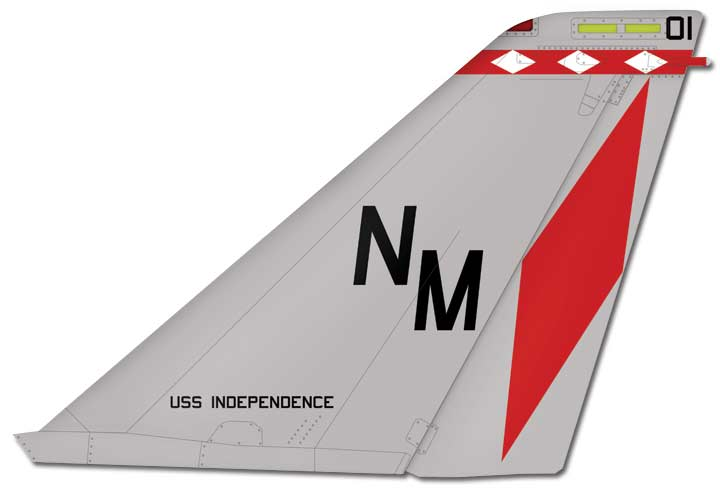
VF-191 F-14 tail markings

VF-191 was established as fighter squadron VF-19 on 15 August 1943. On 15 November 1946 it was re-designated VF-19A. On 24 August 1948 it was finally re-designated VF-191 and adopted the new nickname Satan's Kittens. It was disestablished on 1 March 1978.

The squadron took part in World War II, the Korean War and the Vietnam War. During the latter conflict the squadron took part in several combat cruises, flying variants of the F-8 Crusader. After Vietnam VF-191 continued operations with the F-8 until 1976, when they transitioned to the F-4 Phantom II. A single cruise in the F-4 followed, as VF-191 was disestablished in 1978.

== Deployments ==
from	to	aircraft	carrier	air wing	tail code	area
July 1944	November 1944	F6F-5	CV-16	CVG-19	no code	Pacific War
20 April 1946	9 August 1946	F6F-5	CV-36	CVG-19	A-1xx	WestPac
June 1947	June 1947	F8F-1	CV-21	CVAG-19	B-1xx	not deployed
11 January 1950	13 June 1950	F8F-2	CV-21	CVG-19	B-1xx	WestPac
9 November 1950	29 May 1951	F9F-2	CV-37	CVG-19	B-1xx	Korean War
21 March 1952	3 November 1952	F9F-2	CV-37	CVG-19	B-1xx	Korean War
14 September 1953	22 April 1954	F9F-6	CVA-34	CVG-19	B-1xx	WestPac
2 March 1955	21 September 1955	F9F-6	CVA-34	CVG-19	B-1xx	WestPac
9 March 1957	25 August 1957	FJ-3	CVA-10	CVG-19	B-1xx	WestPac
1 November 1958	19 June 1959	F11F-1	CVA-31	CVG-19	NM-1xx	WestPac
21 November 1959	14 May 1960	F11F-1	CVA-31	CVG-19	NM-1xx	WestPac
26 April 1961	13 December 1961	F8U-1	CVA-31	CVG-19	NM-1xx	WestPac
12 July 1962	11 February 1963	F8U-1	CVA-31	CVG-19	NM-1xx	WestPac
28 January 1964	21 November 1964	F-8E	CVA-31	CVW-19	NM-1xx	Vietnam War
21 April 1965	13 January 1966	F-8E	CVA-31	CVW-19	NM-1xx	Vietnam War
19 October 1966	29 May 1967	F-8E	CVA-14	CVW-19	NM-1xx	Vietnam War
28 December 1967	17 August 1968	F-8E	CVA-14	CVW-19	NM-1xx	Vietnam War
16 April 1969	17 November 1969	F-8J	CVA-34	CVW-19	NM-1xx	Vietnam War
14 May 1970	10 December 1970	F-8J	CVA-34	CVW-19	NM-1xx	Vietnam War
14 May 1971	18 December 1971	F-8J	CVA-34	CVW-19	NM-1xx	Vietnam War
5 June 1972	30 March 1973	F-8J	CVA-34	CVW-19	NM-1xx	Vietnam War
18 October 1973	5 June 1974	F-8J	CVA-34	CVW-19	NM-1xx	Vietnam
16 September 1975	3 March 1976	F-8J	CVA-34	CVW-19	NM-1xx	WestPac
15 February 1977	5 October 1977	F-4J	CV-43	CVW-15	NL-1xx	WestPac

== See also ==
- VF-191 (1986-8)
- History of the United States Navy
- List of inactive United States Navy aircraft squadrons
- List of United States Navy aircraft squadrons
