= Hydraulic containment =

The word "hydraulic" originates from the Greek word ὑδραυλικός (hydraulikos) which in turn stems from ὕδωρ (hydor, Greek for water) and αὐλός (aulos, meaning tube), and "containment" refers to the action of keeping something harmful under control or within limits. Thus, hydraulic containment is the attempt of confining the movement of any harmful fluid within a limit. In the pollution management sense, hydraulic containment is a technique used to control the movement of contaminated groundwater, preventing the continued expansion of the contaminated zone. It is the first step of pump and treat technology for environmental remediation.

== Description ==
The hydraulic containment process is accomplished by three major configurations:

- a pumping well alone;
- a subsurface drain combined with a pump well;
- a well within a barrier wall system: The configuration may involve continuous reactive barriers, funnel-and-gate systems, arrays of wells filled with reactive materials, injected systems.

The set-up of the underground water pumping wells and the pumping system are subjected on the characteristics of the site and type of containment and requires an effective design and operational effort to meet the goal of cleaning. After the 'containment' is done, according to the contamination type and extent, contaminated water can be treated by different conventional or modified physical, chemical or biological methods usually applied in waste water treatment facilities.

== Application ==
As part of pollution management work, this technique can be used to groundwater contaminated with different types dissolved materials, oils, explosives and dissolved metals.

== Benefits ==
- Conventional waste treatment methods can be implemented.
- Handling and management of the system is comparatively easy.
- After treatment, the water can be used (reused) again

== Limitations ==
The technique has some limitations. The pumping may put threat to lowering of groundwater level. Again, the operating costs can be expensive because of the labor-intensive requirements of the method.

== Biological ==
Trees possess the features to act like living pumps as it pulls water out of the ground for its physiological process. This feature attracted environmentalists and led them to think about the possibility of biological hydraulic containment.

Plants such as willow, sunflower, okra, most of the poplars (such as aspen and cottonwood), pull a large amount of capillary water out of the ground, which can be a useful property of some pollution management efforts and environmental engineering. Plants that draw water upwards through the soil into the roots and out through the plant decrease the movement of soluble contaminants downwards, deeper into the site and into the groundwater. Poplars, for example, take up large quantities of water, transpiring between 200 and 1100 liters daily. With the functional water table depression created, pollutants are drawn and then taken up for an additional treatment process.
