= Cornhusker Army Ammunition Plant =

World War II ammunition factory site

Coordinates: 40.91740°N 98.49518°W

The Cornhusker Army Ammunition Plant was built by the U.S. Army beginning in 1942 to produce munitions during World War II. The plant produced munitions during World War II, the Korean War, and the Vietnam War. It is located 6 miles (10 km) west of Grand Island, Nebraska. It is currently an EPA Superfund site because of groundwater contamination by explosives and soil contamination by explosives and heavy metals. The plant occupies 12,042 acres (4,873 ha).

== Facilities ==
The facility included production areas (where munitions were loaded, assembled, and packed), a fertilizer manufacturer, storage facilities, sanitary landfill, and burning grounds where materials contaminated with explosives were ignited. Explosives produced or used included TNT, RDX and HMX.

== Nuclear war contingency plan ==
In the event of nuclear war between the U.S. and the USSR, the Cornhusker plant would have been used as an alternative command and control location for Strategic Air Command forces, with the Headquarters Emergency Relocation Team deploying there from Offutt Air Force Base.

== Superfund status ==
The site was proposed as a superfund site in October 1984 and listed in July 1987. The USACE/Army is currently conducting the first stage of cleanup activities.

== See also ==
- List of Superfund sites in Nebraska
