= Hill 724 =

Site information
- Type: Marines

Location
- Coordinates: 16.19°N 108.135°E

Site history
- Built: 1966
- In use: 1966-1971
- Battles/wars: Vietnam War

Garrison information
- Occupants: 3rd Marine Division; 1st Marine Division

Hill 724 is a former U.S. Marine Corps (USMC) base near the summit of the Hải Vân Pass north of Da Nang in central Vietnam.

== History ==
On 7 February 1965, following the Attack on Camp Holloway, US President Lyndon B. Johnson ordered retaliatory airstrikes against North Vietnam and the deployment of HAWK missiles to South Vietnam to defend against any attacks by the Vietnam People's Air Force. The USMC 1st LAAM Battalion based on Okinawa was ordered to deploy to Da Nang. Arriving by C-130 on 8 February, by 9 February the HAWKs were operational at Da Nang Air Base.

On 8 March 1965, the 9th Marine Regiment made an amphibious landing at Red Beach north of Da Nang while the 1st Battalion 3rd Marines landed at Da Nang AB marking the first deployment of US combat troops to South Vietnam. The 9th Marine Expeditionary Brigade (9th MEB) were tasked with defending Da Nang AB, while overall responsibility for defending the Da Nang area remained with the ARVN. On 20 July the ARVN approved the extension of the Marines' reconnaissance zone up to the Hải Vân Pass.

In August 1966 the Seebees began construction of a base area on Hill 724 near Highway One at the summit of the Hải Vân Pass and Battery A 1st LAAM Battalion moved to the new base from Da Nang AB.

During the Tet Offensive, together with other attacks on US and ARVN facilities in the Da Nang area, at 01:40 on 30 January the Vietcong launched a mortar and rocket attack on Hill 724, wounding three Marines and damaging a HAWK missile launcher. At 09:15 Company G 2nd Battalion 7th Marines engaged a PAVN sapper squad just below the road summit, killing three and capturing two, despite this the PAVN succeeded in blowing up several culverts temporarily closing the Pass.

In July 1969 the 1st LAAM Battalion ceased operations and redeployed to the US.

In late March 1970 the 3rd Battalion 1st Marines took over the defense of the Hải Vân Pass from the 26th Marine Regiment, stationing a reinforced platoon at Hill 724. On 1 August the Marines passed responsibility for the defense of the Pass to the South Vietnamese Regional Force.

On 29 January 1971 the 3rd Battalion, 1st Marines resumed responsibility for the defense of the Pass and engaged in several small skirmishes with PAVN forces attempting to ambush supply convoys.
