= VA-153 (U.S. Navy) =

Attack Squadron 153
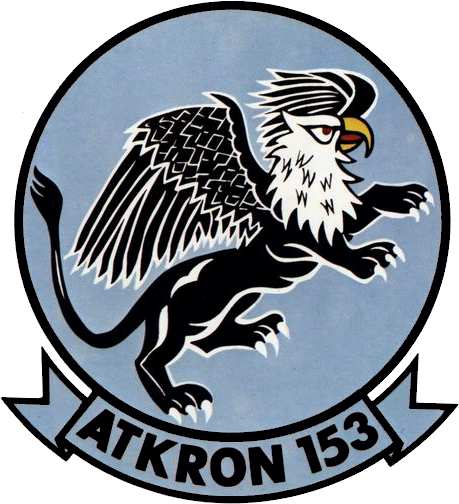
- VA-153 squadron patch
- Active: 1 February 1951 – 30 September 1977
- Country: United States
- Branch: United States Navy
- Role: Attack aircraft
- Part of: Inactive
- Nickname: Blue Tail Flies
- Engagements: Korean War; Second Taiwan Straits Crisis; Vietnam War

Aircraft flown
- Attack: F6F Hellcat; F9 Panther; F9 Cougar; FJ Fury; A-4 Skyhawk; A-7 Corsair II

VA-153 was an Attack Squadron of the United States Navy. During a 1949 reorganization of the Naval Air Reserve, a Fighter Squadron at NAS New York (believed to have been VF-718) was redesignated Fighter Squadron VF-831. It was called to active duty on 1 February 1951. The squadron was redesignated as VF-153 on 4 February 1953, and finally as VA-153 on 15 December 1956. It was disestablished on 30 September 1977. The squadron's nickname was the Blue Tail Flies from 1953 onward.

== Operational history ==
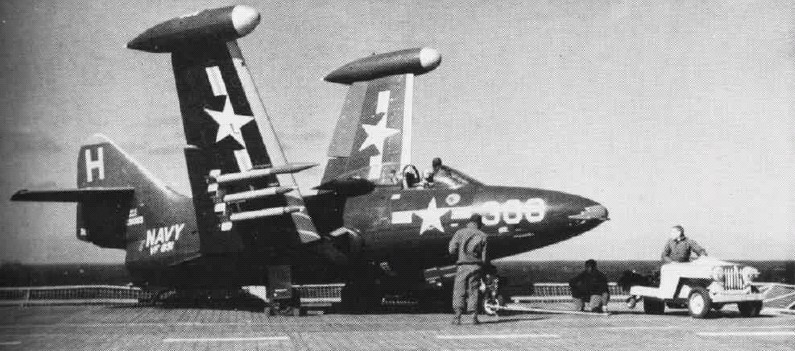
VF-831 F9F-2 on USS Antietam c.1951

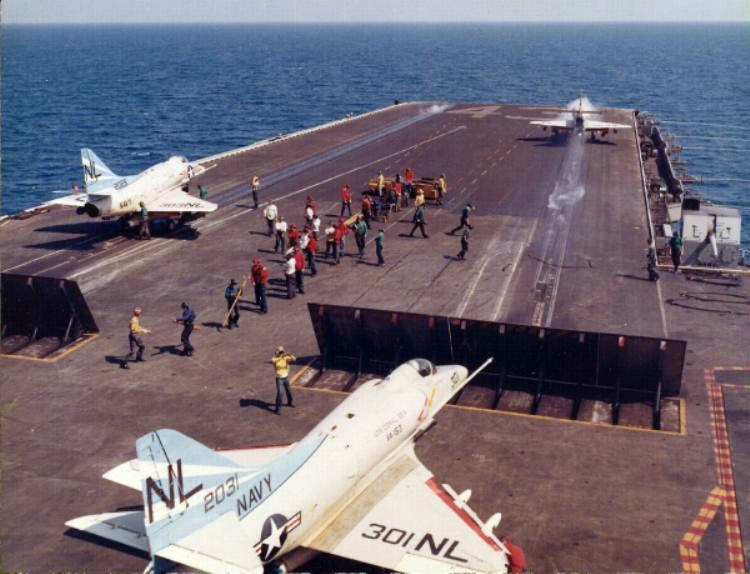
VA-153 A-4Es launching from USS Coral Sea in 1967

- VF-831 was assigned to Carrier Air Group 15 (CVG-15), aboard USS Antietam, which was deployed to Korea from 8 September 1951 to 2 May 1952.
- February 1955: Squadron aircraft flew sorties in support of the evacuation of Chinese Nationalists from the Tachen Islands during the First Taiwan Straits Crisis.
- 23 August – 9 September 1958: The squadron flew sorties in the Taiwan Straits during the Second Taiwan Straits Crisis.
- January 1961: USS Coral Sea, with VA-153 embarked, operated in the South China Sea after Pathet Lao forces captured strategic positions in Laos.
- 2 February 1965: The squadron began participating in operations in Laos. These operations involved Yankee Team, Operation Barrel Roll and Operation Steel Tiger missions.
- 7 and 11 February 1965: The squadron participated in Flaming Dart I and II, reprisal strikes against targets in North Vietnam following a Viet Cong attack on the American advisors compound at Pleiku and the American billet in Qui Nhon, South Vietnam.
- March 1965: The squadron participated in Operation Rolling Thunder, the bombing of military targets in North Vietnam.
- 13 August 1965: The squadron's commanding officer, Commander H. E. Thomas, was killed in action over North Vietnam.
- March 1968: USS Coral Sea, with VA-153 embarked, operated on station off the coast of Korea following the capture of USS Pueblo in January by North Korea.

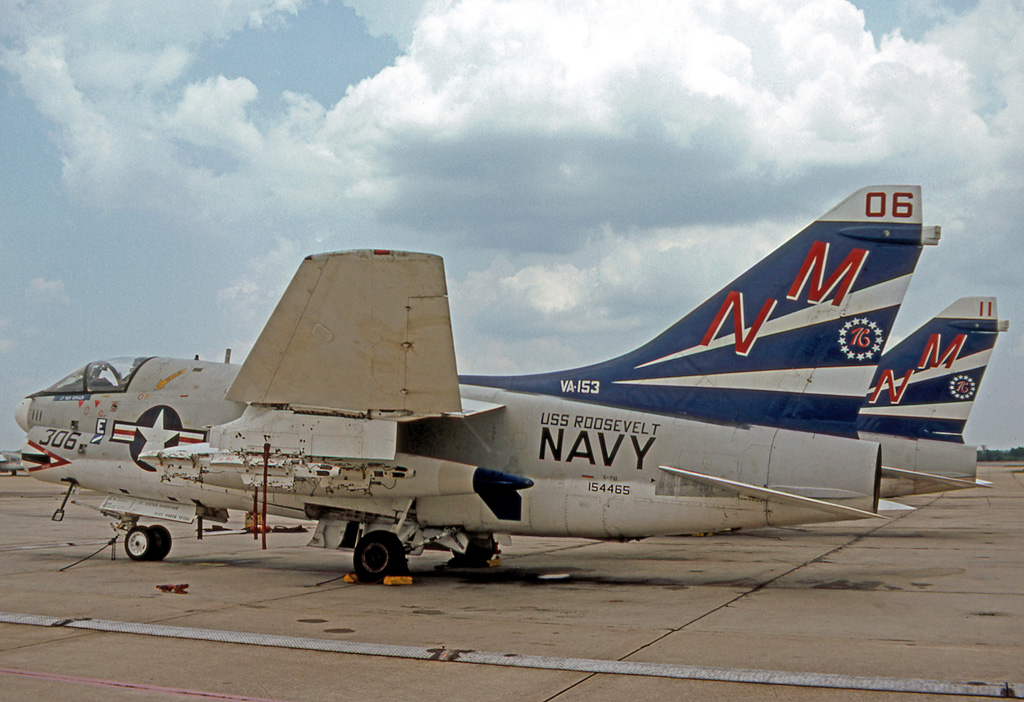
LTV A-7B Corsair II of VA-153 at NAS Cecil Field Florida after service aboard the U.S.S. F.D.Roosevelt in 1976. The aircraft wears bicentennial markings

- 21 November 1970: The squadron flew missions in support of Operation Ivory Coast, an attempt to rescue American prisoners of war at the Son Tay prisoner compound, 20 miles west of Hanoi.
- 11–22 February 1973: Following the ceasefire with North Vietnam the squadron flew combat missions in Laos until a ceasefire was signed with that country on 22 February 1973.
- February 1973: Commander D. R. Weichman, the squadron's executive officer, completed his 625th combat mission of the Vietnam War. He maintains the record for the highest number of combat missions for a Navy fixed-wing pilot during this conflict.
- November 1973: USS Oriskany, with VA-153 embarked, departed from operations in the South China Sea to relieve USS Hancock on station in the Arabian Sea due to the unsettled conditions following the Yom Kippur War.

== Home port assignments ==
The squadron was assigned to these home ports, effective on the dates shown:

- NAS New York (Floyd Bennett Field) – assigned here prior to the squadron's recall to active duty on 1 February 1951.
- NAS Alameda – 1 Apr 1951
- NAS Moffett Field – 5 May 1952
- NAS Lemoore – 21 Aug 1961

== Aircraft assignment ==
The squadron first received the following aircraft on the dates shown:

- F6F Hellcat *
- F9F-2 Panther – 6 Feb 1951
- F9F-5 Panther – Aug 1952
- F9F-6 Cougar – Oct 1953
- FJ-3 Fury – Mar 1955
- F9F-8 Cougar – Nov 1955
- F9F-8B Cougar – Apr 1956
- A4D-1 Skyhawk – 12 Feb 1957
- A4D-2 Skyhawk – 27 Oct 1958
- A4D-2N Skyhawk – 20 Jun 1961
- A-4E Skyhawk – Jan 1967
- A-4F Skyhawk – Apr 1968
- A-7A Corsair II – 14 Sep 1969
- A-7B Corsair II – May 1973

* While in a reserve status from September 1949 to January 1951, the squadron was most likely utilizing F6F pool aircraft assigned to NAS New York.

== See also ==
- List of squadrons in the Dictionary of American Naval Aviation Squadrons
- Attack aircraft
- List of inactive United States Navy aircraft squadrons
- History of the United States Navy
