= VA-216 (U.S. Navy) =

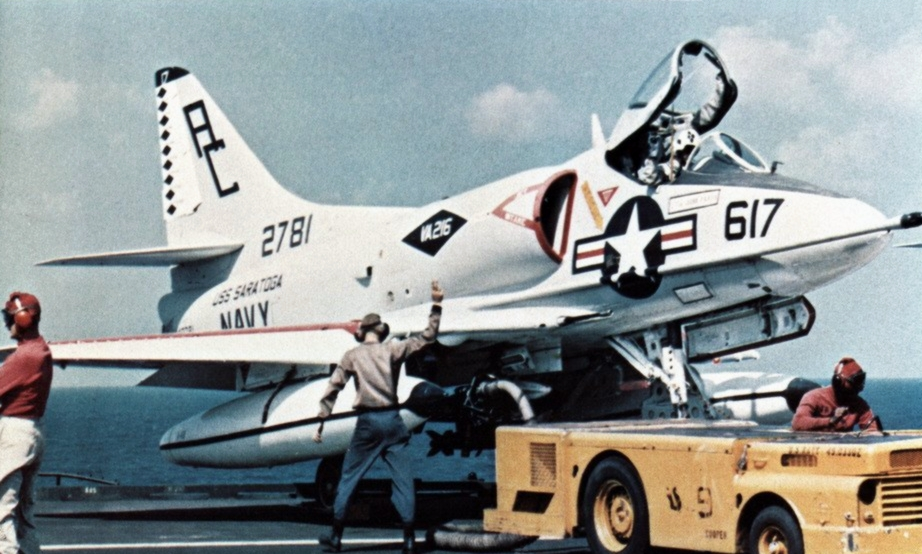
- An A-4B Skyhawk from VA-216 Black Diamonds aboard USS Saratoga, 1967.
- Active: 30 March 1955 – 1 August 1970
- Disbanded: 1 August 1970
- Country: United States
- Branch: United States Navy
- Type: Attack Squadron
- Role: tactical strike and ground attack
- Size: 10-15 aircraft
- Part of: Carrier Air Group 21 (CVG-21); Carrier Air Wing 17 (CVW-17)
- Garrison/HQ: NAS Moffett Field – 30 Mar 1955; NAS Lemoore – Sep 1961; NAS Alameda – 01 Aug 1968
- Nickname(s): Black Diamonds

Aircraft flown
- Attack: Douglas A-1 Skyraider; Douglas A-4 Skyhawk; North American FJ-4 Fury

VA-216, nicknamed the Black Diamonds, was an Attack Squadron of the US Navy. It was established on 30 March 1955, and disestablished 15 years later on 1 August 1970.

== Significant events ==
- Sep 1958: VA-216, embarked in USS Bennington, operated in the Formosa Straits during the Chinese Communist shelling of Quemoy and Matsu.
- 1 Jul 1959: A reorganization by the Commander Naval Air Force, Pacific directed VA-216 and VA-192 to swap aircraft and all personnel. Commander Baumgaertel, the commanding officer of VA-192, became the commanding officer of VA-216 and all other personnel assigned to VA-192 were reassigned to VA-216. The FJ-4Bs that had been assigned to VA-192 were transferred to VA-216. This exchange was similar to a redesignation, but for reasons that are not on record, it was officially directed as an "exchange" rather than as a "redesignation."
- Mar 1961: VA-216, embarked in USS Lexington, was ordered to operate off the coast of Thailand as a result of the deteriorating position of Laotian government forces against the Pathet Lao. Units of Lexington's air group flew reconnaissance missions over Laos.
- Apr 1962: VA-216, embarked in USS Hancock, operated off the coast of South Vietnam during the arrival of the first USMC advisor unit in the Republic of Vietnam.
- May 1962: The squadron, along with other CVG-21 units embarked in Hancock, were prepared to support a United States Marine Corps (USMC) unit that landed at Bangkok, Thailand and moved by air to Udorn Royal Thai Air Force Base. The Marine landing was at the request of the Thai government because of its concerns surrounding the success of Pathet Lao forces along the Thai-Laotian border.
- Sep 1963: VA-216, embarked in USS Hancock, operated off the coast of Taiwan due to increased tensions between the People's Republic of China and the Republic of China.
- Nov 1963: Embarked in USS Hancock, the squadron operated off the coast of South Vietnam following the coup that overthrew President Diệm.
- 29 Dec 1964–May 1965: VA-216 participated in Yankee Team operations, armed reconnaissance flights over Laos, and Operation Barrel Roll, armed reconnaissance and strike missions in eastern Laos covering the infiltration routes used by the Communists.
- 7 Feb 1965: VA-216 participated in Operation Flaming Dart I, striking the military barracks at Đồng Hới. These reprisal attacks against targets in North Vietnam were in response to the shelling of an American advisors compound at Pleiku by the Viet Cong.
- 11 Feb 1965: The squadron participated in Operation Flaming Dart II, reprisal attacks against the barracks at Chanh Hoa, North Vietnam.
- Mar–May 1965: VA-216's aircraft participated in the Operation Rolling Thunder campaign, strikes against designated military targets in North Vietnam.
- Mar 1966: Squadron aircraft participated in Operation Jackstay, providing close air support for the amphibious operations that cleared the Rung Sat zone, the river channels, southeast of Saigon.
- 1 May 1966: Lieutenant C. O. Tolbert was awarded the Silver Star for his actions during a combat mission over North Vietnam involving the Xom Dom Dien supply area and the sighting of a SAM missile battery which was destroyed in a later mission.
- 7 Jul 1966: The squadron's commanding officer, Commander C. Birdwell, was awarded the Silver Star for his actions in a strike against the Haiphong POL storage area.
- Jun 1970: VA-216, embarked in USS Forrestal, operated in the Eastern Mediterranean after American hostages were taken by the Popular Front for the Liberation of Palestine in Amman, Jordan. The squadron, along with other units of CVW-17, were available also for air support during the evacuation of Americans from Jordan.

== Home port assignments ==
The squadron was assigned to these home ports, effective on the dates shown:

- NAS Moffett Field – 30 Mar 1955
- NAS Lemoore – Sep 1961
- NAS Alameda – 01 Aug 1968

== Aircraft assignment ==
The squadron first received the following aircraft on the dates shown:

- AD-4 Skyraider – Apr 1955
- AD-4NA Skyraider – Apr 1955
- AD-5 Skyraider – May 1955
- AD-4B Skyraider – Jul 1955
- AD-7 Skyraider – Oct 1956
- AD-6 Skyraider – Jul 1958
- A4D-2 Skyhawk – 16 Feb 1959
- FJ-4B Fury – 01 Jul 1959
- A4D-2N/A-4C Skyhawk – 04 Sep 1962
- A-4B Skyhawk – Aug 1966
- A-4C Skyhawk – 1968
- A-4E Skyhawk – 13 Jun 1969

== See also ==
- List of squadrons in the Dictionary of American Naval Aviation Squadrons
- Attack aircraft
- List of inactive United States Navy aircraft squadrons
- History of the United States Navy
- List of aircraft carriers
- List of United States Navy aircraft wings
