= List of bombing campaigns of the Vietnam War =

The bombing campaigns of the Vietnam War were the longest and heaviest aerial bombardment in history. The United States Air Force, the U. S. Navy, and U. S. Marine Corps aviation dropped 7,662,000 tons of explosives. By comparison, U. S. forces dropped a total of 2,150,000 tons of bombs in all theaters of World War II.

== List ==
- Farm Gate: 13 January 1962—January 1965.
- Operation Pierce Arrow: 5 August 1964.
- Operation Barrel Roll: 14 December 1964—29 March 1973.
- Operation Flaming Dart: 7 February 1965—24 February 1965.
- Operation Rolling Thunder: 2 March 1965—2 November 1968.
- Operation Steel Tiger: 3 April 1965—11 November 1968.
- Operation Arc Light: 18 June 1965—15 August 1973.
- Operation Tiger Hound: 5 December 1965—11 November 1968.
- Operation Commando Hunt: 11 November 1968—29 March 1972.
- Operation Niagara: January 1968—March 1968.
- Operation Menu (consisting of Operations Breakfast, Lunch, Snack, Dinner, Dessert, and Supper): 18 March 1969—26 May 1970.
- Operation Patio: 24 April 1970—29 April 1970.
- Operation Freedom Deal: 19 May 1970—15 August 1973.
- Operation Linebacker I: 9 May 1972—23 October 1972.
- Operation Linebacker II: 18 December 1972—29 December 1972.

== Sources ==
- Hit My Smoke!: Forward Air Controllers in Southeast Asia. Jan Churchill. Sunflower University Press, 1997. ISBN 0897452151, 9780897452151.
- Vietnam in Military Statistics: A History of the Indochina Wars, 1772-1991. Micheal Clodfelter. McFarland & Company, 1995. ISBN 0786400277, 9780786400270.
