= Operation Spring High =

Airstrike during the Vietnam War

- Part of Vietnam War
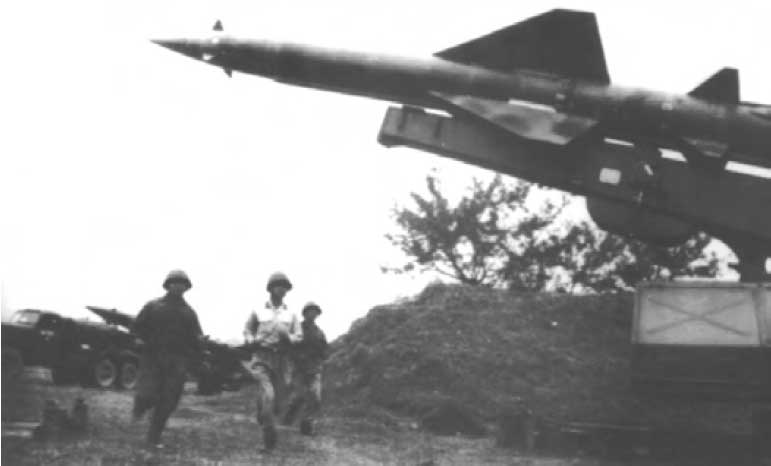
- A North Vietnamese SA-2 surface to air missile, the intended American target during Operation Spring High
Date	27 July 1965
Location	48 kilometres (30 mi) west of Hanoi

Belligerents
United States	North Vietnam

Units involved
48 attack aircraft 58 supporting aircraft	120 anti-aircraft guns Small arms

Casualties and losses
6 F-105D Thunderchiefs destroyed 2 pilots POW; 3 pilots KIA	No SAMs lost

Operation Spring High was a United States military airstrike on 27 July 1965 during Operation Rolling Thunder against two North Vietnamese surface to air (SAM) missile launchers during the Vietnam War. The attack was in retaliation for the first American aircraft lost to a SAM during the war. North Vietnamese officials were aware of the American plan due to a spy, and set a trap for American aircraft. The launchers were evacuated and the area was defended by more than 100 anti-aircraft guns. Six F-105 Thunderchiefs were destroyed during the operation, including a mid-air collision following the attack.

== Background ==
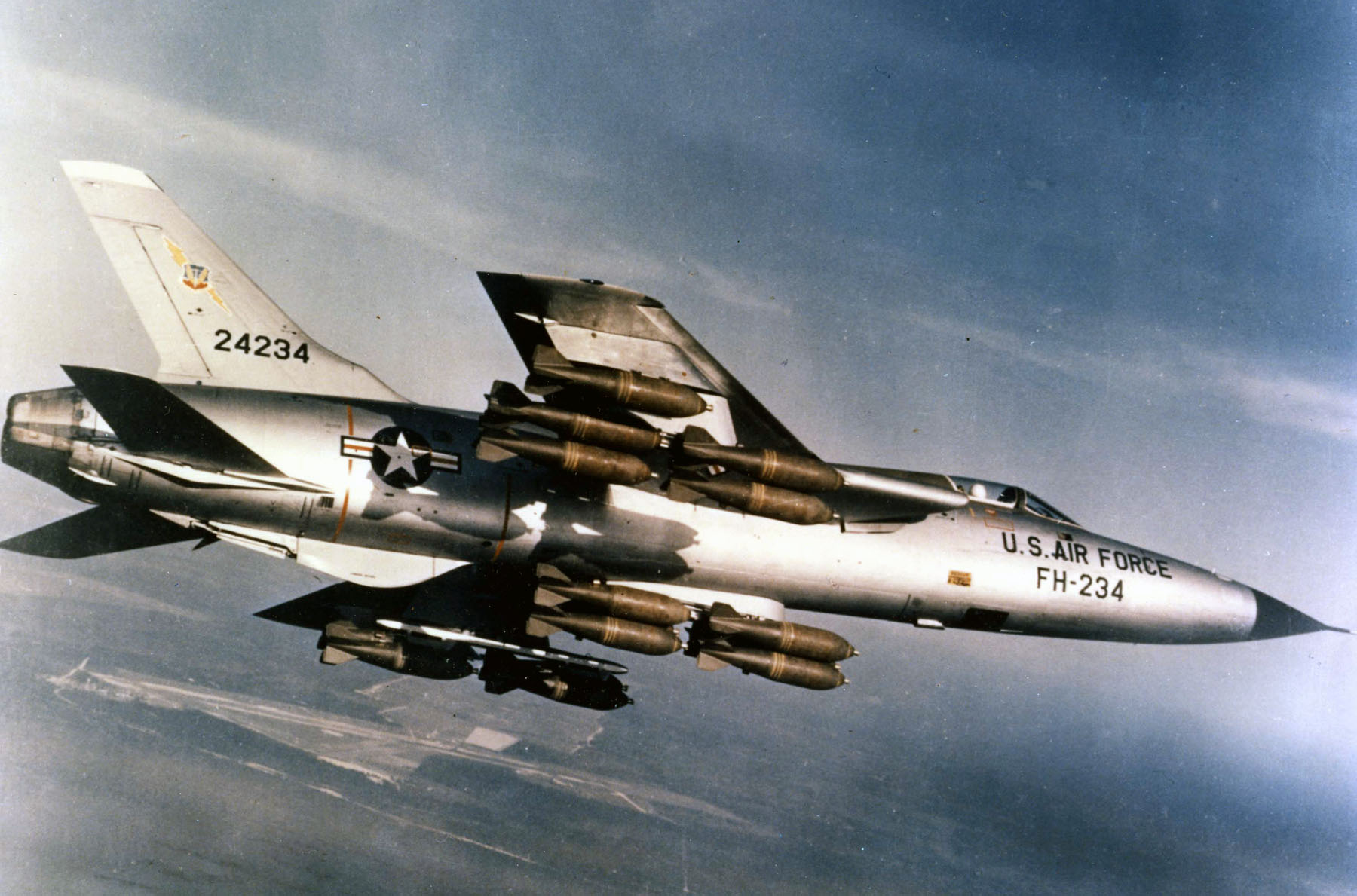
A F-105D Thunderchief, which were used to carry out the strike

Operation Rolling Thunder was an American bombing campaign throughout North Vietnam intended to support South Vietnam and force the North to end support for the Viet Cong. A key goal was to use the threat of strikes against valuable assets as a motive for the North to negotiate for peace. To prevent the destruction of the most critical North Vietnamese targets that would leave nothing valuable to threaten, Hanoi was blacklisted from any strikes.

On 24 July, a North Vietnamese SA-2 surface to air missile (SAM) near Hanoi shot down an American F-4C Phantom II and damaged others; the incident was the first American aircraft loss to a North Vietnamese SAM. While the US had known the North had established SAMs by April, strikes against them were not approved over concerns that any attack would kill Soviet or Chinese technicians. The US designated the involved launchers Site 6 and Site 7 which were located along the Black River and about 48 kilometres (30 mi) west of Hanoi. General John McConnell favored an aggressive American retaliation and proposed attacks to destroy all SA-2 sites in North Vietnam along with Phúc Yên Air Base. The Joint Chiefs of Staff believed other American officials would prefer a more restrained option, which led President Johnson to order an attack only on the SA-2 sites involved in the shootdown on 26 July 1965, with the attack carried out the next day.

== Engagement ==
The attack force comprised 48 F-105D Thunderchiefs armed with CBU-2 cluster bombs, unguided rockets, and napalm. Eleven struck Site 6, twelve on Site 7, and a further 23 attacked barracks in Cam Doi and Phu Nieu suspected of housing SA-2 crews. An additional 58 other aircraft from the US Navy, Air Force, and Marine Corps aircraft provided a supporting role in the American attack. Two EC-121 Warning Stars monitored North Vietnamese aircraft, twelve F-4 Phantom II and eight F-104C Starfighters provided air cover, and fifteen KC-135 Stratotankers provided aerial refueling, which were joined by four RF-101 Voodoos, three B-66 Destroyers, six EF-10B Skyknights, and eight F-105 Thunderchiefs for other tasks such as jamming radars or suppressing anti-air guns. Due to a spy within the 2nd Air Division, the plan was known to the North Vietnamese, who laid a trap. Around the missile sites, the North Vietnamese deployed four regiments of anti-aircraft guns—two equipped with 57 mm (2.2 in) guns and two with 37 mm (1.5 in) guns—along with ten anti-aircraft teams for a total of 120 anti-aircraft guns along with numerous machine guns and rifles. There was no SAM launcher at Site 7, and a fake launcher made out of bamboo painted white was erected at Site 6 to serve as bait.

The attack aircraft flew at an altitude of about 150 metres (500 ft) to be under the SA-2's envelope, which put them in range of the anti-aircraft artillery. The planes flew in a four-aircraft line abreast pattern at an altitude between 15–30 metres (50–100 ft) on the final attack. The awaiting anti-aircraft crews opened fire as the aircraft attacked. One Thunderchief was shot down near Site 7 and the pilot drowned in the Black River. A second was shot down an hour later while dropping napalm and the pilot was captured; the pilot of a third Thunderchief shot down while attacking the barracks was likewise captured. A fourth was heavily damaged but was able to fly far enough away for the pilot to safely eject. He was picked up by a HH-3 Jolly Green Giant helicopter from Laos, which became the deepest search and rescue helicopter mission flown inside North Vietnam to date. A fifth Thunderchief damaged during the attack ran out of hydraulic fluid during an approach to Ubon Royal Thai Air Force Base and collided with another Thunderchief escorting the crippled aircraft. Both planes were destroyed and the pilots were killed, although the US Air Force considered the crash to be an "operational accident" to prevent Thailand's role in the attack to be revealed. In total, six Thunderchiefs were destroyed and five pilots were killed or captured.

== Legacy ==
A US Air Force spokesperson acknowledged that the two Thunderchiefs that collided near Ubon Royal Thai Air Force Base participated in a Rolling Thunder mission, which was reported on by United Press International. The admission agitated Graham Martin, the US ambassador to Thailand, who wanted the event to be described as an accident to prevent Thailand's clandestine role in Rolling Thunder being exposed.

The engagement demonstrated the effectiveness of combining anti-air systems for the North Vietnamese. Following the success, the North Vietnamese Air Force established mobile "air defense combat clusters" which combined anti-aircraft artillery, small arms, and anti-air missile troops. Three clusters were initially established and were assigned to defend key routes.
