= Operation Flaming Dart =

Part of the Vietnam War (1965)

- Part of the Vietnam War
Date	7–11 February 1965
Location	North Vietnam
Result	Set a precedent for more systematic bombing under Operation Rolling Thunder

Belligerents
United States; South Vietnam	North Vietnam; Vietcong

Commanders and leaders
(United States) Lyndon B. Johnson (South Vietnam) Nguyễn Cao Kỳ	(Vietnam) Ho Chi Minh

Operation Flaming Dart was a U.S. and South Vietnamese military operation, conducted in two parts, during the Vietnam War.

== Background ==
United States President Lyndon B. Johnson in February 1965 ordered a series of reprisal air strikes after several attacks on U.S. bases by Vietcong units, particularly in reply to the Viet Cong Attack on Camp Holloway.

== Operation ==
Forty-nine retaliatory sorties were flown for Flaming Dart I on 7 February 1965. Flaming Dart I targeted North Vietnamese army bases near Đồng Hới, while the second wave targeted Vietcong logistics and communications near the Vietnamese Demilitarized Zone (DMZ). Among the pilots was Republic of Vietnam Air Force (RVNAF) Air Marshal Nguyễn Cao Kỳ, then a member of Vietnam's ruling junta.

U.S. Navy aircraft carriers launched aircraft for strikes on the barracks at Vit Thu Lu (just north of the DMZ) and Đồng Hới (somewhat farther to the north). The attack on Vit Thu Lu was cancelled because of heavy clouds over the target. The weather was little better at Dong Hoi, home of the People's Army of Vietnam (PAVN) 325th Infantry Division. A 29-plane strike formation from USS Coral Sea approached the target under a low cloud ceiling at 500 knots. The A-4 Skyhawks of attack squadrons VA-153 and VA-155 hit the barracks with rockets and 250-pound bombs. Prepared as they had not been during Operation Pierce Arrow, North Vietnamese antiaircraft gunners threw up a curtain of fire from 37-millimeter guns, automatic weapons and small arms ashore and from Swatow gunboats in the Kien River. Some of this fire hit Lieutenant Edward A. Dickson's A-4 but he continued his attack before ejecting from his crippled plane, however his parachute failed to open and he plunged to his death. Right behind Coral Seas formation came 17 A-4s of VA-212 and VA-216 from the USS Hancock which dropped their ordnance on already burning and smoking camp facilities as F-8 Crusaders suppressed fire from antiaircraft sites. Completing the mission, RF-8A reconnaissance aircraft rolled in to photograph the scene for naval intelligence analysis. The results were unimpressive. The attack had destroyed or damaged only 22 of the 275 buildings in the camp.

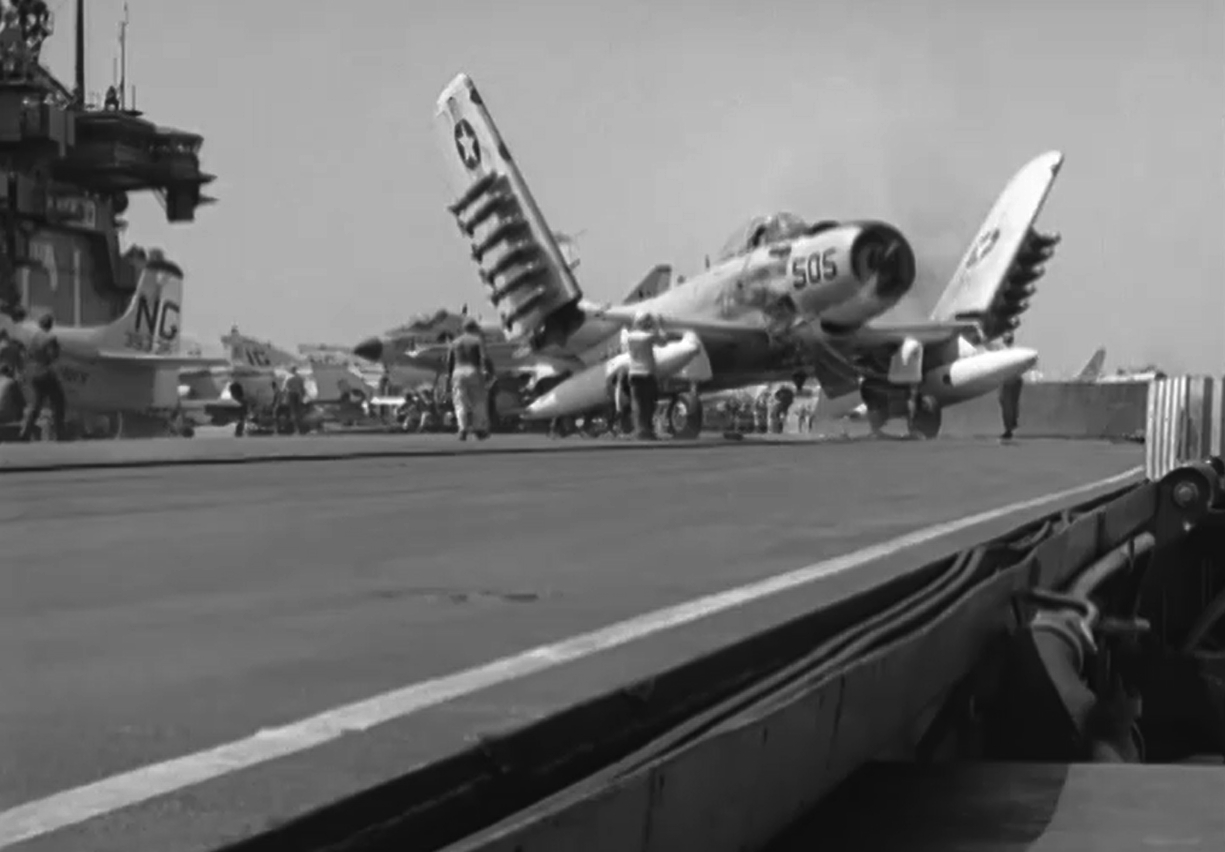
An A-1J Skyraider of VA-95 aboard USS Ranger, 11 February 1965.

In reaction to Flaming Dart the Vietcong attacked a hotel billeting U.S. personnel in Qui Nhơn, prompting the Flaming Dart II airstrikes on 11 February 1965. The U.S. Navy launched 99 fighter-bombers from three carriers: Hancock, Coral Sea and USS Ranger. The A-1 Skyraiders and A-4s from the carriers delivered tons of bombs and rockets to the target area at Chanh Hoa as F-8E Crusaders and F-4B Phantoms rocketed and strafed antiaircraft positions. A total of 33 F-8s, F-4s and A-1s protected the attack force should North Vietnamese MiGs based near Hanoi challenge the mission. Although MiGs did not interfere with the operation, antiaircraft gunners damaged a Coral Sea A-4C, forcing the pilot to make an emergency landing at Da Nang Air Base. Unused bombs still positioned on the wings exploded when the pilot landed at Danang, destroying the aircraft; the pilot survived. Lieutenant Commander Robert H. Shumaker of VF-154 ejected from his stricken F-8 over Chanh Hoa where he was captured by PAVN troops.

While the naval aircraft bombed Chanh Hoa, the RVNAF and the U.S. Air Force (USAF) attacked Chap Le. The RVNAF used 28 propeller-driven A-1s, while the USAF had an equal number of jet-powered F-100 Super Sabres on target. While Americans with Farm Gate had been flying combat with their South Vietnamese counterparts, the USAF strikes in South Vietnam escalated the war by their use of jet aircraft.

American reaction to Communist escalation was not restricted to the bombing of North Vietnam. Washington also escalated its use of air power when it authorized the use of U.S. jet attack aircraft to engage targets in the south. On 19 February 1965, USAF B-57s conducted the first jet strikes flown by Americans in support of South Vietnamese ground units. On 24 February 1965, USAF jets struck again, this time breaking up a Viet Cong ambush in the Central Highlands with a massive series of tactical air sorties. Again, this was an escalation in the U.S. use of air power.

== Aftermath ==
The Operation Flaming Dart raids were later followed by Operation Rolling Thunder, which began a 44-month campaign on 2 March 1965. Other aerial campaigns were also waged during the war. By war's end, the American bombing campaigns during the Vietnam War amounted to the heaviest aerial bombardment in history, totaling 7,662,000 tons of ordnance.

== See also ==
- List of bombing campaigns of the Vietnam War
