= 1965 Qui Nhơn hotel bombing =

Viet Cong bombing in Vietnam (1965)

- Part of the Vietnam War
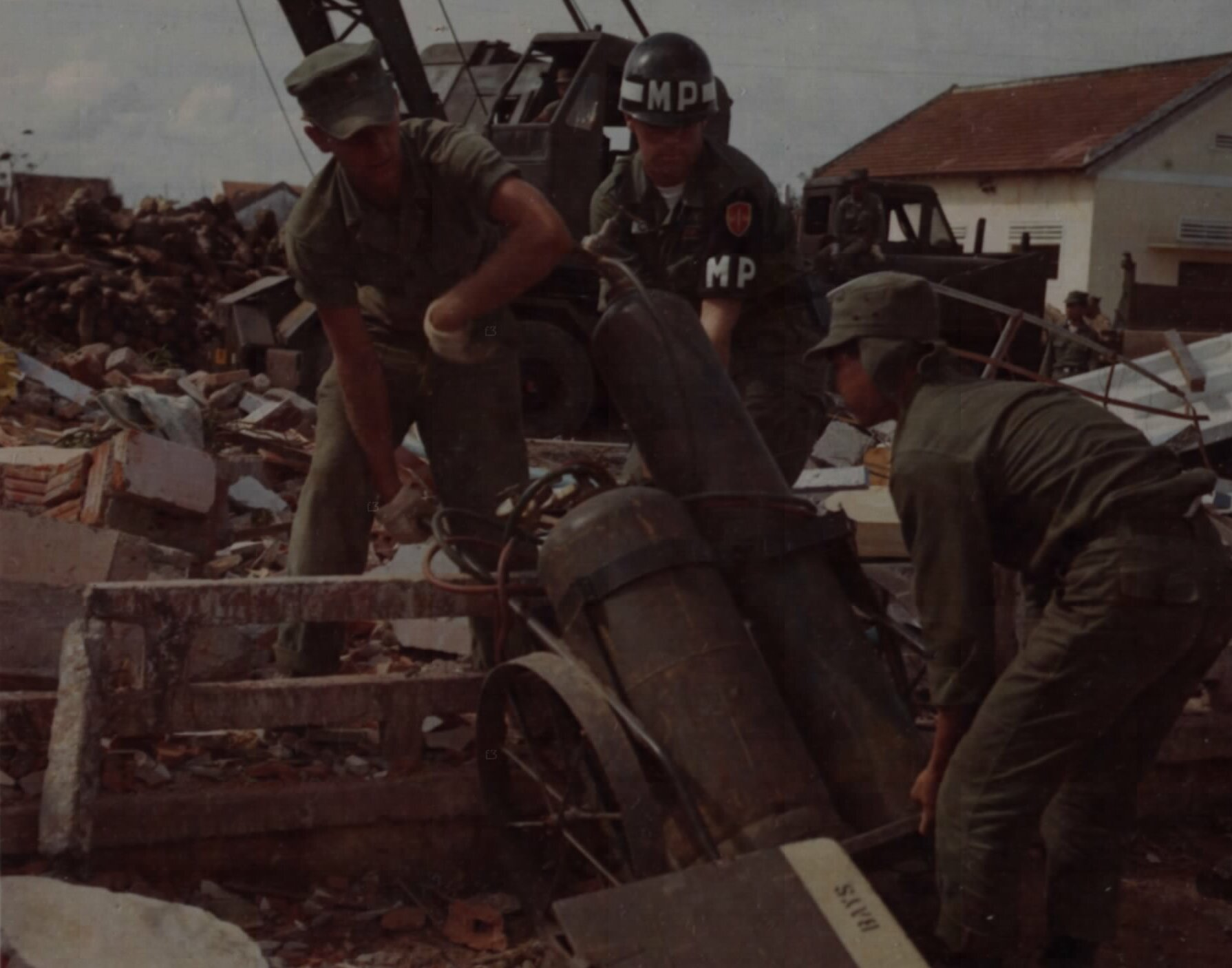
- Rescue workers at the site of the bombing
- Location: Qui Nhơn, South Vietnam
- Date: 10 February 1965
- Attack type: Bombing
- Deaths: 23 U.S. Army; 2 Viet Cong; 7 civilians
- Perpetrator: Viet Cong

The Viet Cuong Hotel in Qui Nhơn was bombed by the Viet Cong on the evening of 10 February 1965, during the Vietnam War. Viet Cong (VC) operatives detonated explosive charges causing the entire building to collapse. The operation killed 23 U.S. servicemen, seven Vietnamese civilians, and two of the VC attackers.

== Background ==
The four-storey Khách Sạn Viet Cuong or Viet Cuong Hotel ("Strength of Vietnam") was used as a U.S. Army enlisted men's billet in the city of Qui Nhơn. Many of the 60 men billeted there came from the 140th Transportation Detachment (Cargo Helicopter Field Maintenance) who provided maintenance support for the 117th Assault Helicopter Company based at Qui Nhơn Airfield.

Following the VC Attack on Camp Holloway on 6–7 February 1965, the U.S. and South Vietnamese launched Operation Flaming Dart, a series of retaliatory airstrikes against North Vietnam. In retaliation for the Flaming Dart attacks the VC immediately planned to hit another U.S. target.

== Explosion ==
At 20:05 the VC began their assault on the hotel, while two VC were killed by machine-gun fire by a U.S. sentry on the hotel roof; VC killed the South Vietnamese guards posted outside the building and placed satchel charges at the main door. A 100-pound plastic charge was detonated next to the staircase which provided the main structural support for the building. The explosion caused the entire hotel to pancake to the ground. 21 members of the 140th Transportation Detachment were killed as were two other soldiers and seven Vietnamese civilians.

== Aftermath ==
Following this attack President Johnson ordered Operation Flaming Dart II. All U.S. dependents in South Vietnam were returned to the U.S.
