= Attack on Camp Holloway =

Part of the Vietnam War (1965)

Coordinates: 13.973°N 108.031°E

- Part of Vietnam War
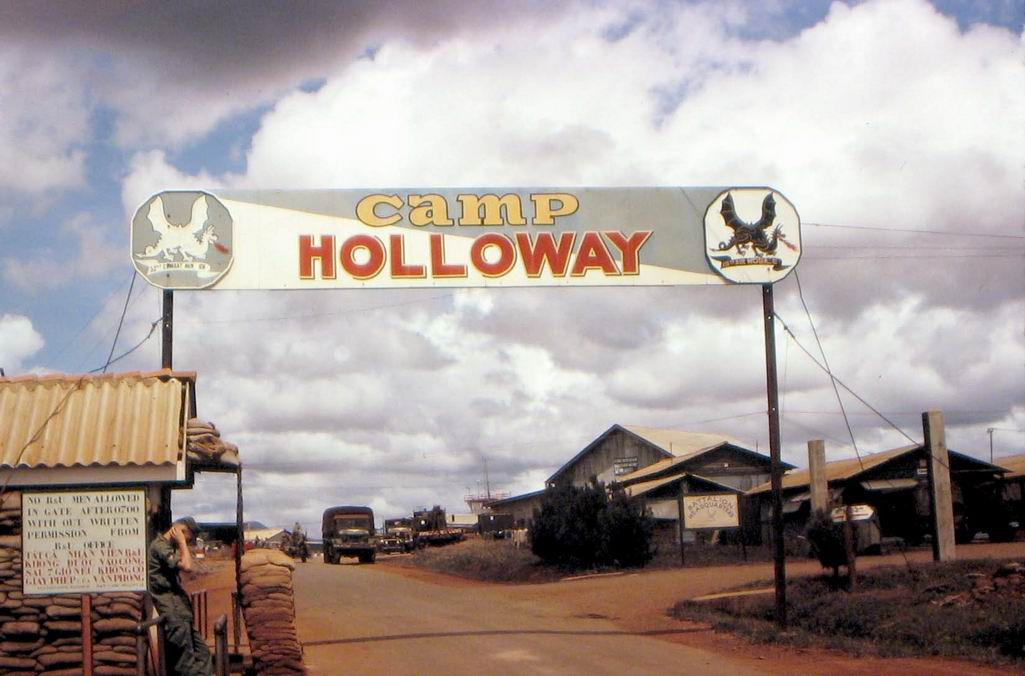
- Camp Holloway was attacked by the Viet Cong on 7 February 1965, which led to the further escalation of the Vietnam War.
Date	6–7 February 1965
Location	Camp Holloway, near Pleiku, Gia Lai Province, South Vietnam
Result	Viet Cong victory United States launched Operation Flaming Dart in retaliation.

Belligerents
(Provisional Revolutionary Government of the Republic of South Vietnam) Viet Cong; North Vietnam	United States of America; South Vietnam

Commanders and leaders
(Provisional Revolutionary Government of the Republic of South Vietnam) Nguyễn Thành Tâm (Provisional Revolutionary Government of the Republic of South Vietnam) Ngô Trọng Đãi	(United States) John C. Hughes

Units involved
409th Sapper Battalion: 30th Company; Gia Lai Province Command: 90th Sapper Company; one squad; one Local Force company	(United States) 52nd Aviation Battalion: 119th Assault Helicopter Company; (South Vietnam) ARVN Ranger: one battalion; (South Vietnam) ARVN Regional Force: five companies

Strength
300	400

Casualties and losses
Probably 1	7 killed 104 wounded 10 aircraft destroyed 15 aircraft damaged

The attack on Camp Holloway occurred during the early hours of February 7, 1965, in the early stages of the Vietnam War. Camp Holloway was a helicopter facility constructed by the United States Army near Pleiku in 1962. It was built to support the operations of Free World Military Assistance Forces in the Central Highlands of South Vietnam.

In August 1964, the United States Navy reported they were attacked by torpedo boats of the North Vietnamese Vietnam People's Navy in what became known as the Tonkin Gulf Incident. In response to the perceived aggression of Communist forces in Southeast Asia, the United States Congress passed the Tonkin Gulf Resolution which enabled U.S. President Lyndon B. Johnson to deploy conventional military forces in the region to prevent further attacks by the North Vietnamese. Immediately after the Tonkin Gulf Resolution was passed, Johnson ordered the bombing of North Vietnamese Navy bases in retaliation for the reported attacks on U.S. Navy warships between 2 and 4 August 1964. However, the Viet Cong (VC) forces in South Vietnam were not deterred by the threat of U.S. retaliation.

Throughout 1964, the VC launched several attacks on U.S. military facilities in South Vietnam but Johnson did not start further retaliations against North Vietnam, as he tried to avoid upsetting U.S. public opinion during the 1964 United States Presidential Election. The Soviet Union, on the other hand, were experiencing political changes of their own as Nikita Khrushchev was removed from power. As leader of the Soviet Union, Khrushchev had begun the process of disengagement from Vietnam by reducing economic and military aid to North Vietnam. However, in the aftermath of Khrushchev's downfall, the Soviet government had to redefine their role in Southeast Asia, particularly in Vietnam, to compete with the growing influence of the People's Republic of China.

In February 1965 Soviet Premier Alexei Kosygin travelled to Hanoi to rebuild Soviet ties with North Vietnam, and the formation of a military alliance was on the agenda. Coincidentally, senior security adviser to the U.S. President McGeorge Bundy was also in Saigon to report on the political chaos in South Vietnam. In the shadow of those events, the VC 409th Battalion staged an attack on Camp Holloway on 7 February 1965. This time, with his victory in the 1964 presidential election secured, Johnson decided to launch Operation Flaming Dart which entailed strikes on North Vietnamese military targets. However, with Kosygin still in Hanoi during the U.S bombing, the Soviet government decided to step up their military aid to North Vietnam, thereby signalling a major reversal of Khrushchev's policy in Vietnam.

A 1997 meeting between senior American and Vietnamese officials revealed that the attack was not directly ordered by Hanoi, nor were they aware of the State Department officials' visit to Saigon. Dang Vu Hiep stated "This was a spontaneous attack by the local commander" and that Alexei Kosygin "was not pleased, but he couldn't say anything." Robert McNamara and CIA analyst Chester L. Cooper commented that had Washington known Vietnamese intentions the attack could have been interpreted differently. McNamara stated, "I think we'd have put less weight on it and put less interpretation on it as indicative of North Vietnam's aggressiveness."

== Background ==
On 2 August 1964, while operating off the North Vietnamese coast in the Gulf of Tonkin, USS Maddox was engaged by three North Vietnamese torpedo boats. In the ensuing battle, a North Vietnamese torpedo boat was reported to be heavily damaged by U.S. fire, while the remaining North Vietnamese vessels were chased off by aircraft from USS Ticonderoga. On 4 August 1964, the United States Navy claimed that a second attack occurred when North Vietnamese Navy vessels fired torpedoes at USS Maddox and USS Turner Joy. In response to the second "unprovoked attack" on U.S. warships, on 7 August 1964 the United States Congress unanimously passed the Tonkin Gulf Resolution which gave President Lyndon B. Johnson the authority to deploy conventional U.S. military forces in Southeast Asia to "prevent further aggression" from North Vietnamese forces, without the formal declaration of war by the Congress.

Even though Johnson had been given a mandate to take military action against North Vietnam and the VC in South Vietnam, he hesitated to take further steps to retaliate against North Vietnam. Towards the end of 1964, Johnson was in the midst of a presidential election and he did not want the U.S. public to believe that he was leading their country into war. Therefore, Johnson decided to wait until after the election, when his presidency was assured, that he would decide on other military moves. Meanwhile, the political situation in South Vietnam continued to worsen; in August 1964, South Vietnamese General Lâm Văn Phát tried to overthrow General Nguyễn Khánh, but the coup was aborted and Phát handed power to Air Marshal Nguyễn Cao Kỳ, and Generals Nguyễn Chánh Thi and Nguyễn Văn Thiệu. However, on 20 December 1964, Khánh formed a new military junta with Kỳ and Thi and the civilian-led High National Council was subsequently dissolved. Thus, the South Vietnamese Government was once again plunged into chaos.

In Moscow, between November and December 1964, at two sessions of the Presidium of the Soviet Communist Party Central Committee, Soviet leaders discussed the topic of Soviet military aid to North Vietnam. Although details of the discussions were not made public, the first indication of Soviet strategy in Vietnam came on 24 December 1964, when the Soviet government invited the North Vietnamese-backed VC to open a permanent mission in Moscow. Then on 4 February 1965 McGeorge Bundy, national security adviser to President Johnson, arrived in Saigon to meet with the then U.S. Ambassador to South Vietnam, General Maxwell Taylor, to discuss the political situation in the country. Two days later on 6 February 1965, Soviet Premier Alexei Kosygin arrived in Hanoi for a historic visit to North Vietnam, included in his entourage was a team of Soviet missile experts.

== Attack ==
Early in 1965, as American and Soviet leaders were cementing their strategy in Vietnam, the VC 409th Battalion was ordered to begin their part of the Communist spring offensive by attacking the U.S. airfield at Camp Holloway near Pleiku in Gia Lai Province and the South Vietnamese Army base at Gia Hựu in Bình Định Province. Camp Holloway, which is about 4 kilometers (2.5 mi) east of Pleiku, was opened by the U.S. Army's 81st Transportation Company in August 1962, and the camp was subsequently named for Chief Warrant Officer Charles E. Holloway, who was killed in action in December 1962. Towards the end of 1964, about 400 members of the U.S. Army 52nd Combat Aviation Battalion—under the command of Lieutenant Colonel John C. Hughes—were deployed to Camp Holloway with the purpose of supporting South Vietnamese and other Free World Military Assistance Forces in the regions of I Corps and II Corps Tactical Zones.

Nguyễn Thành Tâm, commander of the VC 409th Battalion, ordered his 30th Company to leave their base area and marched into the Central Highlands, to reconnoitre and attack the U.S. airfield at Camp Holloway and the U.S. advisory compound of Military Assistance Command, Vietnam II Corps. In February 1965, Camp Holloway's outer perimeter was protected by a South Vietnamese security contingent which included one Ranger battalion, five Regional Force companies and one armored squadron. However, in their reconnaissance of Camp Holloway, the VC found the security barrier which surrounded the U.S. advisory compound was the real challenge, as it was protected by several layers of concertina wire fences which measured about 10 meters (33 ft) high.

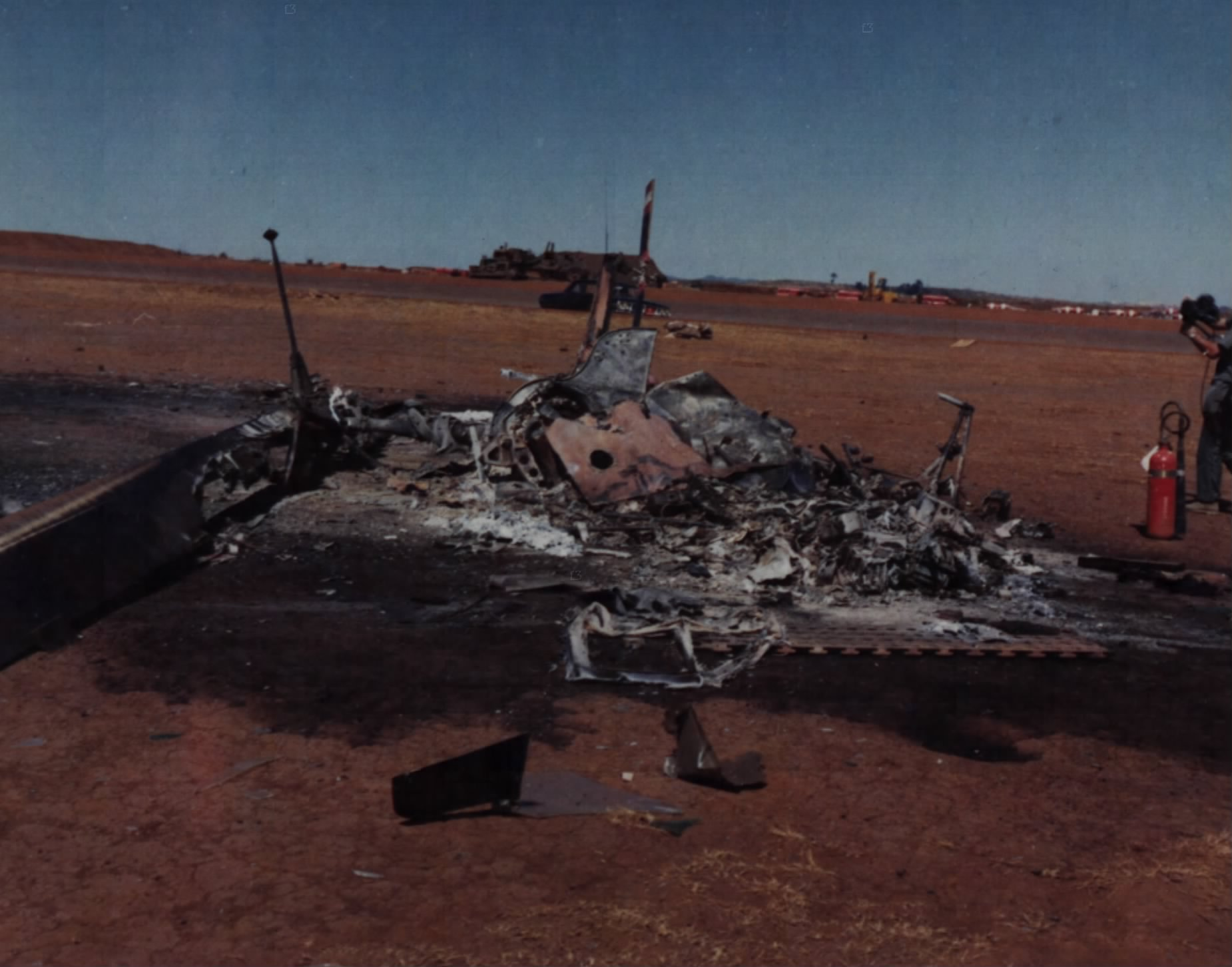
Helicopter destroyed in the attack, 7 February 1965

To overcome the U.S. defenses at Camp Holloway, Tâm organized the 30th Company into two sections. The first section, under Tâm's direct command, was to destroy U.S. aircraft on the airfield, and establish a route of retreat for the attack force. The second section, led by Ngô Trọng Đãi, was ordered to attack the U.S. advisory compound and the facilities where U.S. pilots and technicians were housed. The 30th Company was issued with four 81mm mortars and 70 mortar shells for their attack on Camp Holloway, and were reinforced by one combat engineer platoon, one sapper platoon and one local force company of Gia Lai Province. VC combat engineers were required to break through the wire fences which protected the U.S. facility at Camp Holloway, and protect the attack forces' route of retreat using land mines. Meanwhile, the Gia Lai local force company had to set up ambush positions around the U.S. facility, to stop possible reinforcements.

At around 23:00 on 6 February 1965, about 300 VC soldiers of the 30th Company assembled at their positions outside Camp Holloway, where they began breaking through the wire fences. However, the VC's mission nearly turned into a disaster when their combat engineers accidentally tripped an electrical wire after breaking through the third fence barrier, but the U.S. Military Police patrolling the area did not detect it. Only 44 South Vietnamese guards were on duty at the time of the attack. At 01:50 on 7 February 1965, the VC attackers opened fire with their AK-47 rifles, having successfully penetrated Camp Holloway. Shortly afterwards, the VC attacked the airfield and the U.S. advisory compound, while the sections of the 30th Company attacked their respective targets with small arms fire. A U.S. sentry fired on the VC as they placed the explosive charges on the advisory barracks wall and successfully prevented the VC from entering the barracks. About five minutes later, the VC began retreating from the facility. The attack caused the death of seven U.S. soldiers and 104 wounded. In addition, ten aircraft were destroyed and 15 more were damaged. The VC claim to have destroyed 20 aircraft and killed over 100 Americans/South Vietnamese.

U.S. editorial cartoonist Bill Mauldin was visiting his son on the base at the time of the attack and was uninjured.

== Aftermath ==
When news of the attack on Camp Holloway reached Saigon on the morning of 7 February 1965, General William Westmoreland, McGeorge Bundy and Ambassador Maxwell Taylor, flew out to Pleiku to survey the damage. Bundy then called President Johnson to put forward the MACV's request for retaliatory air strikes against North Vietnam. In response to Bundy's request, Johnson hastily convened a session of the National Security Council, which involved the speaker of the House of Representatives and the Senate majority leader, to discuss the need for reprisal against the Communists in Vietnam. That afternoon, General Nguyễn Khánh arrived in Pleiku to meet with Westmoreland and Bundy, and they both informed him that recommendations for air strikes against North Vietnam had been made to the President of the United States.

Just 12 hours after the attack, Johnson started Operation Flaming Dart to bomb selected North Vietnamese targets. Accordingly, 49 U.S. fighter-bombers took off from USS Coral Sea and USS Hancock to attack North Vietnamese barracks in Đồng Hới, just north of the 17th Parallel. When informed of the strikes, Khánh reportedly opened a bottle of champagne to celebrate the occasion because it served to bolster the morale of the South Vietnamese military, and showed that the U.S. was now more determined to fight North Vietnam. The VC however were not deterred by those air strikes, as they launched another attack on a U.S. installation in Qui Nhơn on 10 February 1965, which caused the death of a further 23 U.S. military personnel. In response, a combined force of about 160 U.S. and South Vietnamese fighter-bombers launched a larger attack against the North Vietnamese, targeting Chap Le and Chanh Hoa, also located just north of the 17th Parallel.

The U.S. bombing of North Vietnam in February 1965 had a decisive impact on the Soviet Union's strategy in Vietnam. Since Hồ Chí Minh and his Communist Party won control of North Vietnam in 1954, Hồ's government had not always enjoyed cordial relations with their Soviet allies. For example, in 1957 the Soviet government proposed that both North and South Vietnam be given a seat in the United Nations, a move which would have undermined the North's claim as the sole legitimate government of the whole country. Then in February 1964, North Vietnam joined the People's Republic of China in refusing to sign the Partial Nuclear Test Ban Treaty, which was an insult to the policy of co-existence adopted by the then Soviet Premier Nikita Khrushchev. By that time, however, Khrushchev had already begun the process of disengagement from Vietnam because of the growing conflict in the region was becoming more expensive for the Soviet Union, with North Vietnam relying more on it for large amounts of economic and military aid.

The rift between Khrushchev's Soviet government and North Vietnam was clearly obvious in August 1964, when the Soviet Union responded in a relatively muted fashion after the U.S. conducted air strikes against North Vietnamese Navy bases in retaliation for the Tonkin Gulf incident. Despite the Soviets' lack of response, the North Vietnamese leadership restrained itself from criticizing the Soviet government, as they were still hoping that Khrushchev would supply North Vietnam with the anti-aircraft weapons required to defend against further U.S. air attacks. However, the event which occurred in Moscow in October 1964 worked in North Vietnam's favor, as Khrushchev was removed from power. Keen to counteract Chinese influence in the region, a new Soviet government led by Alexei Kosygin sought to end a defense pact with North Vietnam.

During Kosygin's stay in Hanoi, North Vietnam was subjected to U.S. air strikes which infuriated the Soviet government. Consequently, on 10 February 1965, Kosygin and his North Vietnamese counterpart, Prime Minister Phạm Văn Đồng, issued a joint communique which highlighted the Soviet resolve to strengthen North Vietnam's defensive potential by giving it all "necessary aid and support". Then in April 1965, while on a visit to Moscow, General Secretary of the Vietnamese Communist Party Lê Duẩn signed a missile agreement with the Soviet Union, which gave the North Vietnamese military what they needed to resist Operation Rolling Thunder.

Thanh Minh Tám - A Núk, a Sedang soldier of VC the 90th sapper company, who purportedly used 8 explosive charges to destroy 16 U.S. aircraft in this attack, was awarded the Hero of the People's Armed Forces on 19 September 1967.
