= Operation Rolling Thunder =

US aerial bombing campaign against North Vietnam (1965–68)

- Part of the Vietnam War
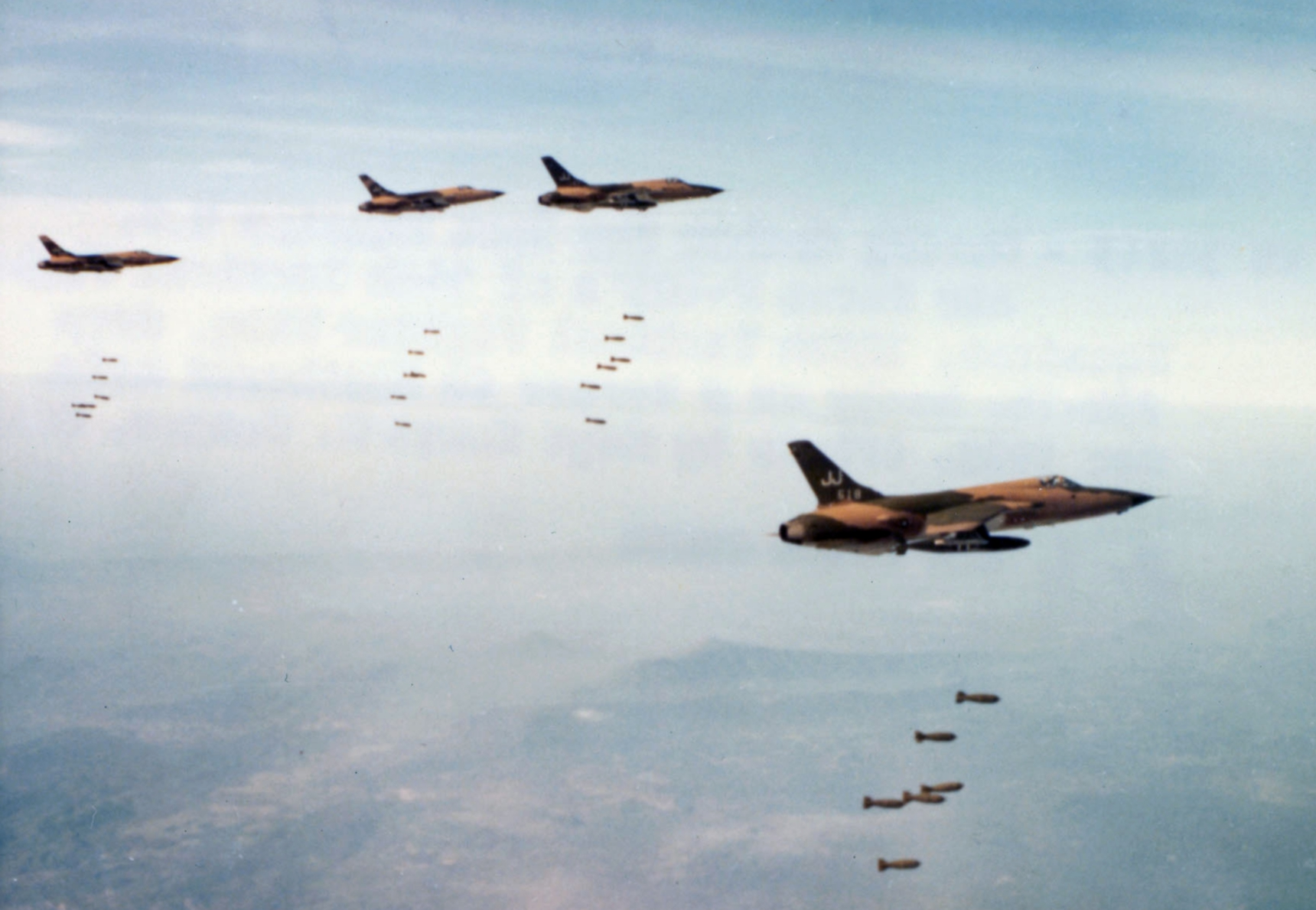
- Republic F-105D fighter-bombers of the United States Air Force drop 750 pound bombs over Vietnam during Operation Rolling Thunder
Date	2 March 1965 – 31 October 1968
Location	Over North Vietnam
Result	U.S./South Vietnamese strategic failure

Belligerents
United States; South Vietnam	North Vietnam; China; North Korea

Commanders and leaders
(United States) Lyndon B. Johnson; (United States) Robert McNamara; (United States) Joseph H. Moore; (United States) William W. Momyer; (United States) George S. Brown; (South Vietnam) Nguyen Cao Ky	(North Vietnam) Phung The Tai (Air Defense); (North Vietnam) Nguyen Van Tien (Air Force)

Casualties and losses
U.S.: 1,054 killed, wounded or captured; 922 aircraft shot down (excluding the number of aircraft that were badly damaged beyond repair); South Vietnam unknown North Vietnam claim 3,243 aircraft, helicopters and UAVs shotdown 363 pilots were captured	North Vietnam: 20,000 soldiers and 30,000–65,000 civilians killed; 85–120 aircraft destroyed; North Korea 14 pilots killed China 20,000 support personnel casualties

Operation Rolling Thunder was a gradual and sustained aerial bombardment campaign conducted by the United States (U.S.) 2nd Air Division (later Seventh Air Force), U.S. Navy, and Republic of Vietnam Air Force (RVNAF) against North Vietnam from 2 March 1965 until 31 October 1968, during the Vietnam War.

The objectives of the operation (which evolved over time) were to boost the morale of South Vietnam; to force North Vietnam to stop sending soldiers and materiel into South Vietnam to fight in the communist insurgency; and to destroy North Vietnam's transportation system, industrial base, and air defenses. Attainment of these objectives was made difficult by both the restraints imposed upon the U.S. and its allies by Cold War exigencies, and the military aid and assistance received by North Vietnam from its communist allies: the Soviet Union, China, and North Korea.

The operation became the most intense air/ground battle waged during the Cold War period; it was the most difficult such campaign fought by the United States since the aerial bombardment of Germany during World War II. Supported by its communist allies, North Vietnam fielded a potent mixture of MiG fighter-interceptor jets and sophisticated air-to-air and surface-to-air weapons that created one of the most effective air defenses ever faced by American military aviators. The limited effectiveness of the operation and the pursuit of peace talks led to the scaling back of the operation in March 1968 and its cancellation in November 1968.

== Gradually escalating action ==
=== Background ===
In response to President Ngo Dinh Diem's abrogation of the 1956 reunification election and suppression of communists during the late 1950s, Hanoi had begun sending arms and materiel to the Vietcong (VC), who were fighting an insurgency to topple the American-supported Saigon government. To combat the VC and to shore up the government in the south, the U.S. initially delivered monetary aid, military advisors, and supplies. Between 1957 and 1963, the U.S. found itself committed, through its acceptance of the policy of containment and belief in the domino theory, to defending South Vietnam from what it saw as expansive communist aggression. (Note: In its public defense of its policies, the State Department argued that South Vietnam was "fighting for its life against a brutal campaign of terror and armed attack inspired, directed, supplied, and controlled by the communist regime in Hanoi. U.S. Department of State, p. 60.)

U.S. policy was for a time dictated by its perception of improvement in the Republic of Vietnam (South Vietnam). (Note: The coup against President Ngo Dinh Diem had unleashed a maelstrom of political unrest and communist victories. Coup followed coup in Saigon as Army of the Republic of Vietnam (ARVN) generals vied for power. There were seven governments in Saigon in 1964, three between 16 August and 3 September alone. Gillespie, p. 63.) No further commitment by the Americans would occur without tangible proof of the regime's survivability. Events in South Vietnam, however, outpaced this plan. By the beginning of 1965, the policy was reversed in the belief that without further American action the Saigon government could not survive. As late as 8 February, however, in a cable to US Ambassador to South Vietnam Maxwell Taylor, Johnson stressed that the paramount goal of a bombing campaign would be to boost Saigon's morale, not to influence Hanoi, expressing hope "that the building of a minimum government will benefit by ... assurances from us to the highest levels [of the South Vietnamese government] that we ... intend to take continuing action." (Note: According to VanDeMark, Rolling Thunder failed to achieve any such objective. VanDeMark, p. 69.)

Questions then arose among the U.S. administration and military leadership as to the best method by which Hanoi (the perceived locus of the insurgency) could be dissuaded from its course of action. The answer seemed to lie in the application of air power. By 1964 most of the civilians surrounding President Lyndon B. Johnson shared the Joint Chiefs of Staff's collective faith in the efficacy of strategic bombing to one degree or another. They reasoned that a small nation like North Vietnam, with a tiny industrial base that was just emerging after the First Indochina War, would be reluctant to risk its new-found economic viability to support the insurgency in the south. Constantly affecting this decision-making process were fears of possible counter moves or outright intervention by the Soviet Union, China, or both. The civilians and the military were divided, however, on the manner of affecting Hanoi's will to support the southern insurgency. The civilians thought in terms of changing the regime's behavior while the military men were more concerned with breaking its will.

In August 1964, as a result of the Gulf of Tonkin Incident, in which U.S. naval vessels were attacked by North Vietnamese patrol boats, Johnson commenced Operation Pierce Arrow, which launched retaliatory air strikes, against the north. (Note: See Edwin E. Moise, Tonkin Gulf.) This did not, however, satisfy the military chiefs, who demanded a wider and more aggressive campaign.

=== Implementation ===
In March 1964 the Commander in Chief Pacific (CINCPAC) began developing plans for a sustained eight-week air campaign designed to escalate in three stages. This was published at the end of August as CINCPAC OPLAN 37–64, which included the "94 target list". Bridges, rail yards, docks, barracks and supply dumps were all targeted, and selected based on a criterion system considering:

(a) reducing North Vietnamese support of communist operations in Laos and South Vietnam, (b) limiting North Vietnamese capabilities to take direct action against Laos and South Vietnam, and finally (c) impairing North Vietnam's capacity to continue as an industrially viable state.

There was widespread concern that an air campaign could lead to a wider conflict involving the Chinese or Soviets. Westmoreland referred to "an almost paranoid fear of nuclear confrontation with the Soviet Union" and a "phobia" that the Chinese would invade. Johnson later noted:

By keeping a lid on all the designated targets, I knew I could keep the control of the war in my own hands. If China reacted to our slow escalation by threatening to retaliate, we'd have plenty of time to ease off the bombing. But this control—so essential for preventing World War III—would be lost the moment we unleashed a total assault on the North—for that would be rape rather than seduction—and then there would be no turning back. The Chinese reaction would be instant and total.

For a time, no overt action was taken, and the plans continued to evolve. A further refinement of the plan was developed by William and McGeorge Bundy on 29 November 1964, with a more moderate target list, which the Joint Chiefs opposed. No action was taken while these, and other, plans were considered. But matters came to a head with the attack on Camp Holloway on 7 February 1965, which demanded immediate action, and resulted in a reprisal raid known as Operation Flaming Dart. A sapper raid against an American enlisted men's billet at Qui Nhon on the 10th led to Flaming Dart II. These small-scale operations were launched against the southern region of the country, where the bulk of North Vietnam's ground forces and supply dumps were located.

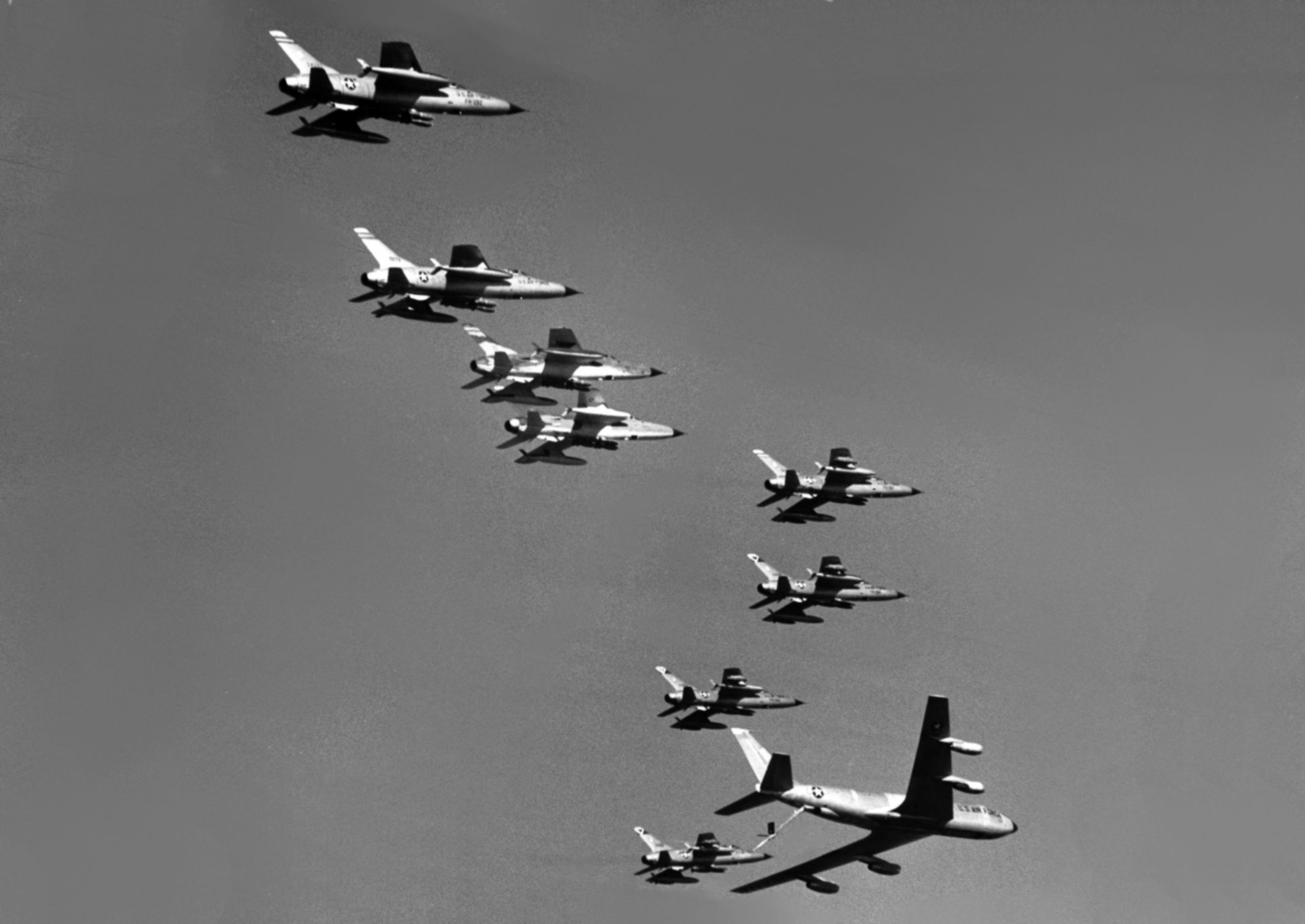
F-105Ds refueling en route to North Vietnam in 1965

These actions led to the plans for a sustained air campaign being reconsidered. On 13 February a new plan was approved and given the name "Rolling Thunder", merging targets and priorities from the lists produced by the Bundys and the JCS. This campaign was not aimed at specific actions on the part of the North Vietnamese, but was intended as a larger response to the growing hostilities as a whole. Although some within the administration believed that the campaign would be costly, and that it might not work, they reasoned that it was "an acceptable risk, especially when considered against the alternative of introducing American combat troops." (Note: For the Secretary of Defense's thoughts on the planning and implementation of the air campaign see McNamara, pp. 171–177.) Rolling Thunder called for an eight-week air campaign consistent with the restrictions imposed by Johnson and Secretary of Defense McNamara. If the insurgency continued "with DRV support, strikes against the DRV would be extended with intensified efforts against targets north of the 19th parallel."

It was believed that selective pressure, controlled by Washington, combined with diplomatic overtures, would prevail and compel Hanoi to end its aggression. The military was still not satisfied, since, for the time being, the bombing campaign was to be limited to targets below the 19th parallel, each of which would have to be cleared individually by the President and McNamara. (Note: The daily target selection meetings were soon replaced by weekly sessions and finally by the creation of bi-weekly "force packages.")

The first mission of the new operation was launched on 2 March against an ammunition storage area near Xom Bang carried out by a strike package of 104 US aircraft containing B-57s, F-105s, and F-100s. On the same day, 19 RVNAF A-1 Skyraiders struck the Quang Khe Naval Base. The Americans were shocked when six of their aircraft were shot down during the mission. Five of the downed crewmen were rescued, but it was a portent of things to come. On 14 March the RVNAF led by General Nguyễn Cao Kỳ participated in attacks on barracks on Hòn Gió island. The RVNAF contributed 19 sorties in March and 97 in April to attacks on North Vietnam.

== Over the north ==
=== Strategic persuasion ===
Under the doctrine of "gradualism", in which threatening destruction would serve as a more influential signal of American determination than destruction itself, it was thought better to hold important targets "hostage" by bombing trivial ones. From the beginning of Rolling Thunder, Washington dictated which targets would be struck, the day and hour of the attack, the number, and types of aircraft and the tonnages and types of ordnance utilized, and sometimes even the direction of the attack. Airstrikes were strictly forbidden within 30 nautical miles (60 km) of Hanoi and within 10 nautical miles (20 km) of the port of Haiphong. A thirty-mile buffer zone also extended along the length of the Chinese frontier. According to U.S. Air Force historian Earl Tilford:

Targeting bore little resemblance to reality in that the sequence of attacks was uncoordinated and the targets were approved randomly—even illogically. The North's airfields, which, according to any rational targeting policy, should have been hit first in the campaign, were also off-limits.

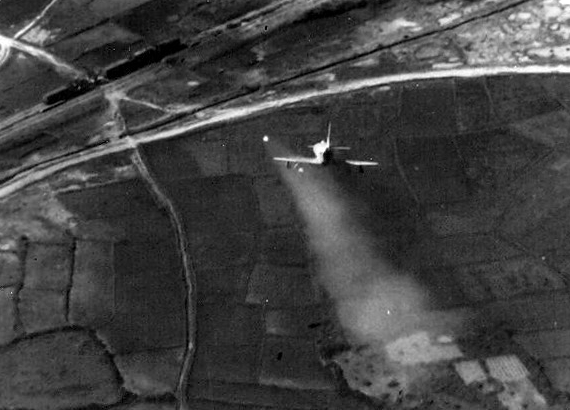
A U.S. Navy Douglas A-4 Skyhawk attacking a train in North Vietnam with a Zuni rocket

Although some of these restrictions were later loosened or rescinded, Johnson (with McNamara's support) kept a tight rein on the campaign, which continuously infuriated the American military commanders, right-wing members of Congress, and even some within the administration itself. One of the primary objectives of the operation, at least to the military, should have been the closure of Haiphong and other ports by aerial mining, thereby slowing or halting the flow of seaborne supplies entering the north. Johnson refused to take such a provocative action, however, and such an operation was not implemented until 1972. There was also little consultation between Johnson and the military chiefs during the target selection process. Even the chairman of the Joint Chiefs, General Earle Wheeler, was not present for most of the critical discussions of 1965 and participated only occasionally thereafter.

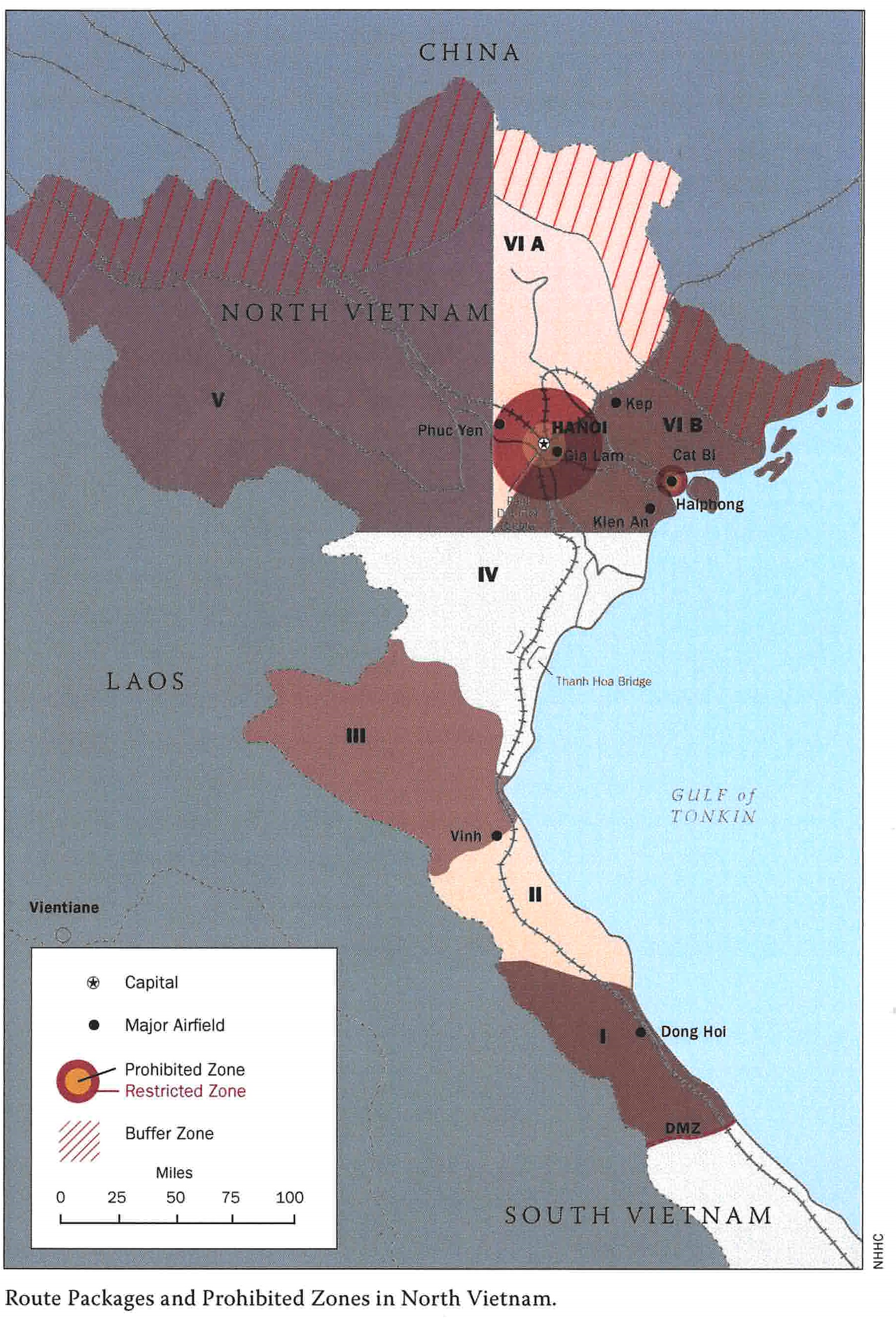
Route Package organization

The majority of strikes during Rolling Thunder were launched from four air bases in Thailand: Korat, Takhli, Udorn, and Ubon. (Note: Only one South Vietnam-based squadron (based at Da Nang) participated in the DRV missions.) The aircraft refueled from aerial tankers over Laos before flying on to their targets in the DRV. After attacking their targets (usually by dive-bombing) the strike forces would either fly directly back to Thailand or exit over the relatively safe waters of the Gulf of Tonkin. It was quickly decided that, in order to limit airspace conflicts between air force and naval strike forces, North Vietnam was divided into six target regions called "route packages", each of which was assigned to either the Air Force or Navy and into which the other was forbidden to intrude.

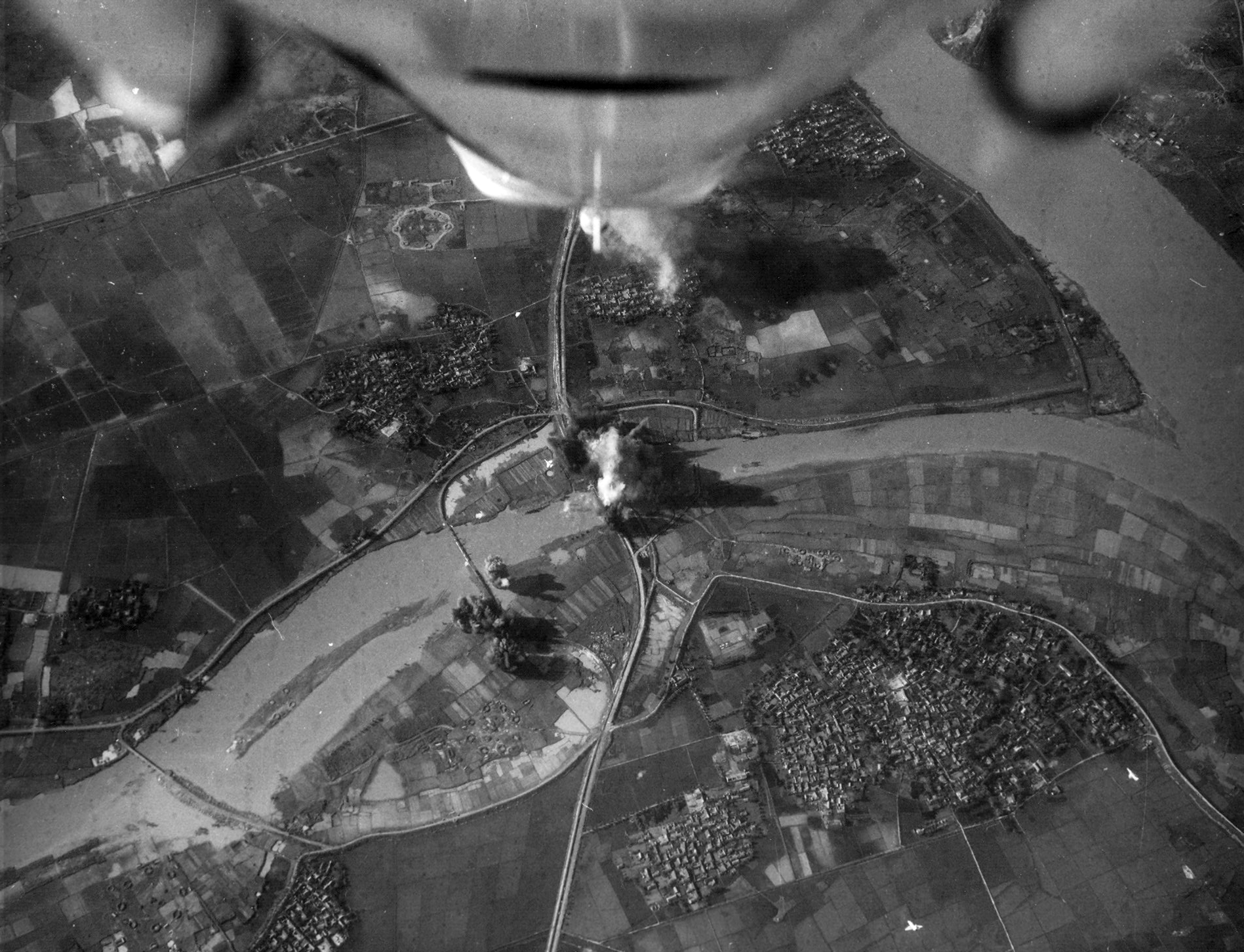
A-4E Skyhawks attacking Phuong Dinh bridge in 1967

Naval strikes were launched from the aircraft carriers of Task Force 77, cruising off the North Vietnamese coast at Yankee Station. Naval aircraft, which had shorter ranges (and carried lighter bomb loads) than their air force counterparts, approached their targets from seaward with the majority of their strikes flown against coastal targets. (Note: This also helped account for the lower number of aircraft and pilot losses suffered by the Navy. Fighters had only to defend a 90-degree arc in front of the strike force, SAM exposure was more limited, and coastal targets made the shorter distances of search and rescue operations more conducive to success.)

On 3 April the Joint Chiefs persuaded McNamara and Johnson to launch a four-week attack on North Vietnam's lines of communication, which would isolate the country from its overland sources of supply in China and the Soviet Union. About one-third of the North's imports came down the Hanoi–Lào Cai railway from China, while the remaining two-thirds came by sea through Haiphong and other ports. For the first time in the campaign, targets were to be chosen for their military, rather than their psychological, significance. During the four weeks, 26 bridges and seven ferries were destroyed. Other targets included the extensive North Vietnamese radar system, barracks, and ammunition depots.

The panhandle of southern North Vietnam remained the primary focus of operations, and total sorties flown there rose from 3,600 in April to 4,000 in May. Slowly moving away from the destruction of fixed targets, "armed reconnaissance" missions, in which small formations of aircraft patrolled highways, railroads, and rivers, searching for targets of opportunity, were authorized. These missions increased from two to 200 sorties per week by the end of 1965. Eventually, armed reconnaissance missions constituted 75 percent of the total bombing effort, in part because the system through which fixed targets were requested, selected, and authorized was so complicated and unwieldy.

=== Changing priorities and POL strikes ===
If Rolling Thunder was supposed to "send signals" to Hanoi to desist in its actions, it did not seem to be working. On 8 April, responding to requests for peace negotiations, North Vietnamese premier Pham Van Dong stated that they could only begin when: the bombing was halted; the U.S. had removed all of its troops from the south; the Saigon government recognized the demands of the VC, and it was agreed that the reunification of Vietnam would be settled by the Vietnamese themselves.

As part of a large attack on the Thanh Hóa Bridge on 3 April, the VPAF first appeared as two flights of four Mikoyan-Gurevich MiG-17s launched from Noi Bai airbase and shot down an F-8 Crusader, (Note: Some sources, including Toperczer, claim two F-8s were shot down on 3 April. But the U.S. accounting of SE Asia losses shows no Crusaders lost that date.) while losing just one of their own aircraft, written off when it landed on a river bed after running short of fuel. A repeat the next day resulted in a classic dogfight with F-100 Super Sabres and F-105s fighting with more MiG-17s. In total, the USAF lost eleven aircraft to air and ground forces, while the VPAF lost three of their fighters.

The entire complexion of the American effort was altered on 8 March 1965, when 3,500 U.S. Marines came ashore at Da Nang, ostensibly to defend Da Nang Air Base which was committed to prosecuting Rolling Thunder. The mission of the ground forces was expanded to combat operations, and the aerial campaign became a secondary operation, overwhelmed by troop deployments and the escalation of ground operations in South Vietnam. Until the third week of April, Rolling Thunder had enjoyed at least equal status with air missions conducted in the south. After that time, strikes that interfered with requirements for the southern battlefield were either cut back or canceled.

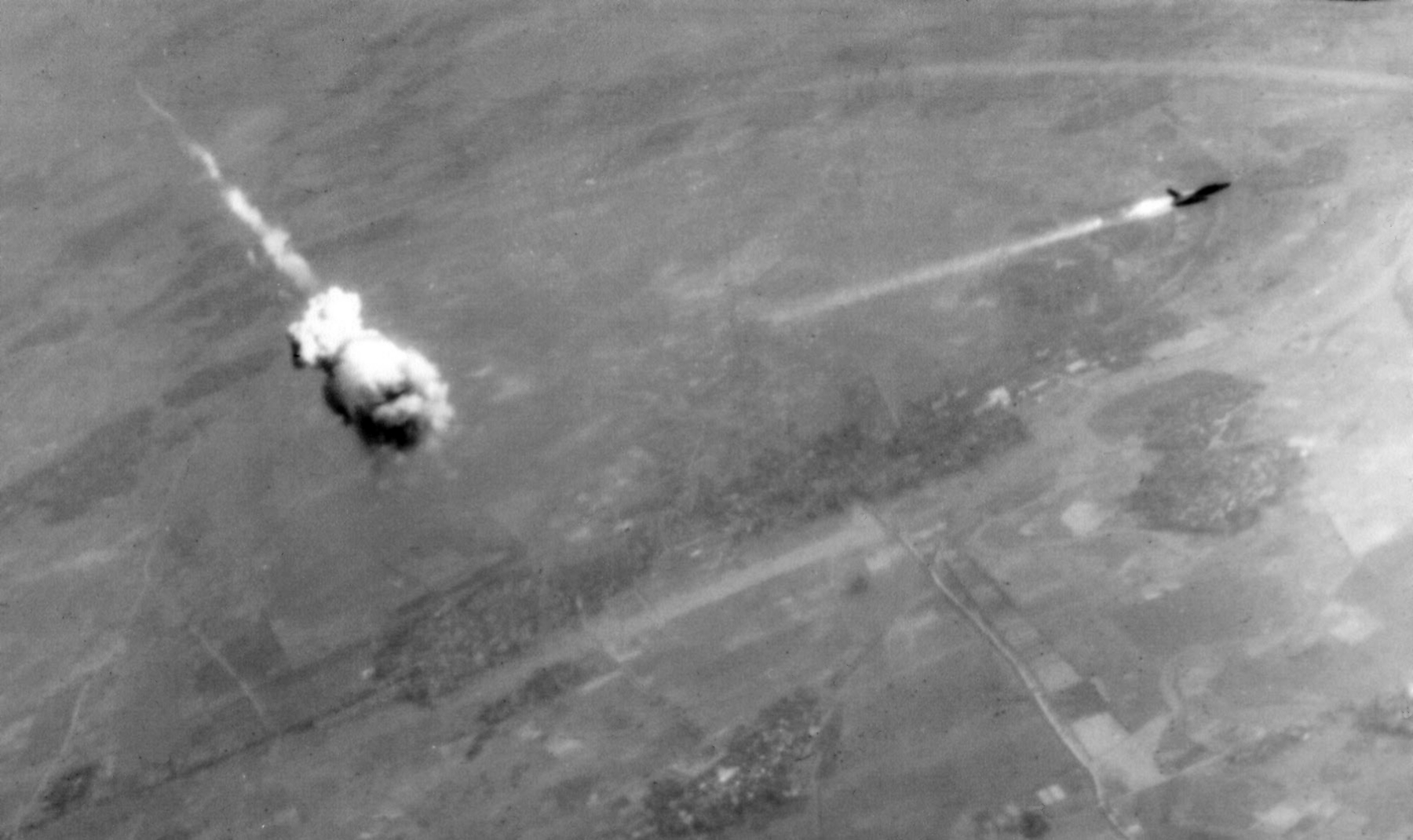
An F-105D hit by an SA-2 missile

On 5 April 1965, U.S. reconnaissance discovered the construction of North Vietnamese surface-to-air missile (SAM) launching sites. Washington refused to allow the Air Force and Navy to attack the sites since most were near the restricted urban areas. Then, on 24 July, an McDonnell Douglas F-4 Phantom II was shot down by a SA-2 Guideline missile. Three days later, a one-time strike was authorized against two missile sites. The sites were traps with dummies defended by anti-aircraft artillery (AAA). Six strike aircraft were destroyed, with two pilots killed, one missing, two captured, and one rescued. A U.S. pilot described the action as "looking like the end of the world."

On 29 June 1965, airstrikes against the North's petroleum, oil, and lubricants (POL) storage areas were authorized by Johnson. The American military had advocated such strikes since the inception of the operation, believing that to deny North Vietnam its POL would cause its military effort to grind to a halt. At first, the strikes appeared highly successful, destroying tank farms near Hanoi and Haiphong and leading the CIA to estimate that 70 percent of North Vietnam's oil facilities had been destroyed for the loss of 43 aircraft. The loss of the oil storage tank farms and refineries proved to be only a short-term inconvenience for North Vietnam, however, since Hanoi had anticipated just such a campaign and had during that time dispersed the majority of its POL stocks in 190-litre (50 US gal) drums across the length of the country. The POL attacks were halted on 4 September, after U.S. intelligence admitted that there was "no evidence yet of any shortages of POL in North Vietnam."

By 24 December 1965, 180 U.S. aircraft had been lost during the campaign (85 Air Force, 94 Navy and one Marine Corps). Eight RVNAF aircraft had also been lost. (Note: These losses include not only combat shootdowns, but those due to accidents, mechanical failure and unknown causes.) Air Force aircrews had flown 25,971 sorties and dropped 32,063 tons of bombs. Naval aviators had flown 28,168 sorties and dropped 11,144 tons. The RVNAF had contributed 682 missions with unknown ordnance tonnages.

== Reactions ==
=== Problems ===
Rolling Thunder exposed many problems within the American military services committed to it and tended to exacerbate others. A key interservice issue (and one which was not solved until 1968) was the command and control arrangement in Southeast Asia. The USAF's 2nd Air Division (replaced by the Seventh Air Force on 1 April 1966) was ostensibly responsible for aerial operations over North and South Vietnam. It was subordinate, however, to MACV and its commander, U.S. Army General William C. Westmoreland, who tended to see his problems centered in the south. The U.S. Seventh/Thirteenth Air Force, based in Thailand (which carried out the majority of the Air Force's strikes in North Vietnam), had a dual command structure. It reported to the Seventh on operational matters and to the Thirteenth Air Force (whose headquarters was in the Philippines) for logistical and administrative concerns. These command and control complexities grew even more tangled with the division of the aerial effort into four competing operational areas (those in South Vietnam, North Vietnam, and Laos (both north and south).

The Navy's Task Force 77 took its orders via 7th Fleet from CINCPAC, a Navy admiral based in Honolulu, through his subordinate, the Air Force commander of Pacific Air Forces (PACAF). Due to their influence, the Navy could not be persuaded to integrate its air operations over North Vietnam with those of the Air Force. General William W. Momyer, commander of the Seventh, had the impression that CINCPAC and PACAF wanted to keep the Thai-based aircraft out of his hands. "By denying Momyer, they were really denying Westmoreland and keeping air operations against the DRV under their control." (Note: This policy was ultimately unsuccessful. In November 1965, bombing in the area abutting the DMZ (Route Package One) was handed over to Westmoreland as part of the "extended battlefield." Schlight, A War Too Long, p. 48.) To complicate matters, the U.S. ambassadors to Thailand (Graham Martin) and Laos (William H. Sullivan) exerted undue influence over operational and command arrangements.

This bizarre command structure went against the grain of the Air Force's single air manager concept, which dictated that one commander was to control and coordinate all aircraft within a combat theater. (Note: See Operation Niagara.) The chain through which operational strike requests had to flow gave some indication of the growing overcomplexity of the campaign. Requests for airstrikes originated with the 2nd Air Division and Task Force 77 in Vietnam and then proceeded to CINCPAC, who in turn reported to his superiors, the Joint Chiefs, at the Pentagon. After input from the State Department and the CIA, the requests then proceeded to the White House, where the president and his "Tuesday Cabinet" made decisions on the strike requests on a weekly basis. (Note: The meetings were usually attended by the president, McNamara, Secretary of State Dean Rusk, and the president's special assistant for national security affairs, McGeorge Bundy.)

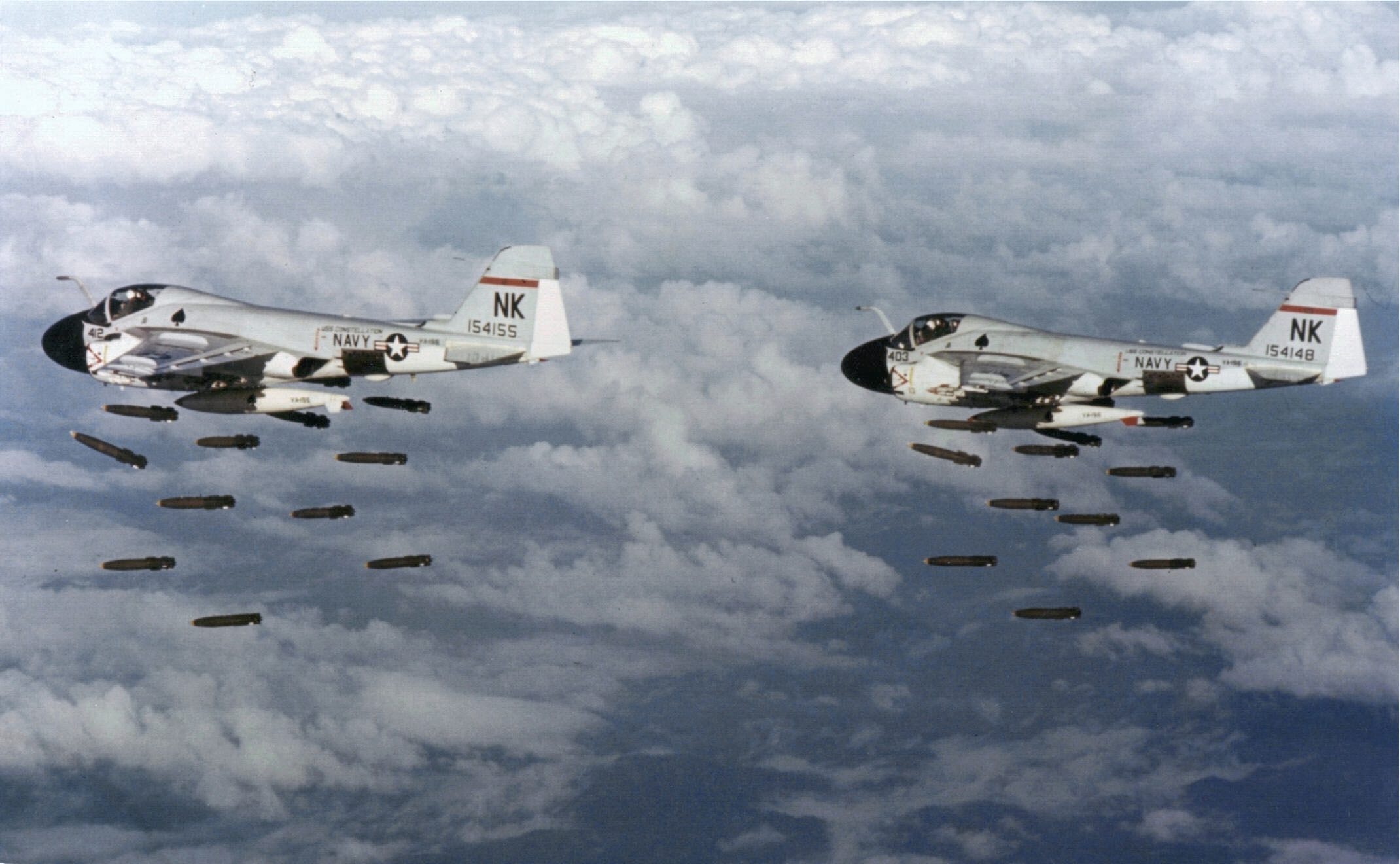
U.S. Navy A-6A Intruder all-weather bombers, in 1968

Another problem exposed by Rolling Thunder was the unpreparedness of the Air Force for the operations it was undertaking. Its aircraft had been designed and its pilots trained for strategic operations against the Soviet Union—for nuclear, not conventional war. The new campaign exposed years of neglect in conventional tactics, while aircraft capabilities and armament were ill-suited to the task at hand. The Air Force was also embarrassed by the fact that the Navy was better prepared. It possessed the only all-weather bomber in the U.S. inventory in the new A-6 Intruder and was also responsible for the development of the F-4 Phantom fighter-bomber, which became ubiquitous during the Vietnam War. (Note: The Air Force's unpreparedness was further revealed by its lack of adequate aerial reconnaissance aircraft (e.g. O-1 observation aircraft used for crucial Forward Air Control missions over South Vietnam, which it originally had to borrow from the Army) and tactical fighter-bombers (e.g. Korean War-era A-1 Skyraiders, which it had to obtain from the Navy). The F-4 Phantom that the Air Force fielded was not equipped with a gun since it was expected to conduct air-to-air combat operations solely with missiles. Momyer had long opposed putting a gun on the F-4 and was convinced to do so only after air-to-air engagements in 1966. The first Air Force version equipped with an internal gun only appeared in 1968. Thompson, p. 64.)

Once air-to-air combat began over North Vietnam, the Air Force was again found lacking. The mainstay missiles of the air war turned out to be the Navy-developed AIM-9 Sidewinder and AIM-7 Sparrow, not its own AIM-4 Falcon. The Air Force continuously opposed adapting to the war in Southeast Asia, since its leadership believed that it was an aberration that would be quickly resolved. It could then turn its attention (and its more modern weapons) against the greater threat posed by the Soviet Union. None in the Air Force high command foresaw that the war would drag on for nearly a decade.

The Air Force did possess an aircraft which had an all-weather capability, radar-guided bombing equipment and considerable destructive potential—the B-52 Stratofortress. The civilian administration, however, never considered utilizing the large bombers (whose operations remained under the control of the Strategic Air Command) very far north of the DMZ, believing that it was too overt an escalation. Air Force Chief of Staff John P. McConnell also opposed sending the bombers into the air defense environment in the north and limited B-52 strikes to Route Package One. (Note: This policy compounded already existing tensions between airmen and their Army and Navy counterparts. The airmen were already upset that Westmoreland was ordering "the greatest strategic bomber ever built" into a ground support role, but then to have a naval officer (CINCPAC) pick their targets was simply unbearable. Head, p. 23.)

Compounding these issues was the one-year rotation policy adopted by the Pentagon in Southeast Asia. Although the first aircrews arriving in-theater were highly experienced, the rapidly growing tempo and ever-expanding length of the operation demanded more personnel. This exacerbated a growing lack of experienced aircrews. This dilemma was further compounded by an Air Force policy which dictated universal pilot training while proscribing involuntary second combat tours, which combined, had the effect of rotating personnel to different aircraft. (Note: An experienced F-4 pilot could end up flying FAC missions in an O-2 Skymaster during a subsequent tour whereas an SAC or Military Airlift Command pilot could end up flying the F-4 Phantom.) Conversely, the Navy tended to maintain its aircrews within the same community for the duration of their careers, thereby retaining their expertise, but also incurring greater losses among experienced crews undergoing multiple combat tours.

Another factor was the weather within the operational theater. The cyclical monsoon patterns meant that the weather was deplorable for flight operations eight months of the year (from late September to early May) when rain and fog tended to conceal targets. Lack of adequate all-weather and night-bombing capability made it necessary for the majority of U.S. missions to be conducted during daylight hours, thereby easing the burden on the air defense forces of North Vietnam.

According to American writer Stephen Budiansky, "captured documents showed that the North Vietnamese had at least thirty to forty-five minutes' warning of 80 to 90 per cent of Rolling Thunder missions." The North Vietnamese signals intelligence staff of 5,000 "proved adept at exploiting traffic analysis as NSA was. Every U.S. bombing mission was preceded by an upsurge of traffic involving logistics, ordnance loading, weather flights, and aerial refueling tankers, and even if none of the content of the signals was readable, the pattern was a dead giveaway." Additionally, "nearly all radio communications of the U.S. air operations used unencrypted tactical voice."

=== People's War in the Air ===
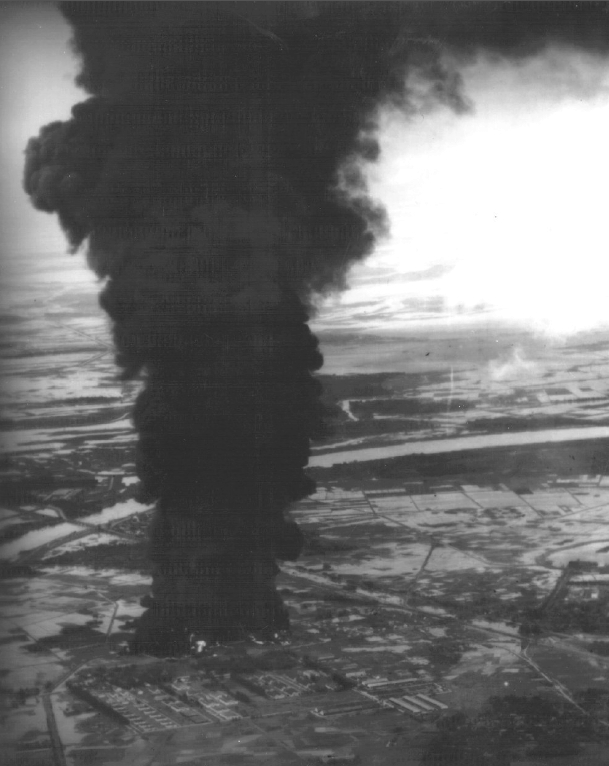
The Hanoi POL facility burning after it was attacked by the U.S. Air Force on 29 June 1965

Before Rolling Thunder even began the North Vietnamese leadership knew what was coming. It issued a February 1965 directive to the military and the population to "maintain communication and transportation and to expect the complete destruction of the entire country, including Hanoi and Haiphong." The communist leadership declared "a people's war against the air war of destruction...each citizen is a soldier, each village, street, and plant a fortress on the anti-American battlefront." All except those deemed "truly indispensable to the life of the capital" were evacuated to the countryside. By 1967, Hanoi's population had been reduced by half.

Since gaining air superiority over U.S. forces was out of the question, the northern leadership decided to implement a policy of air deniability. At the beginning of the campaign, North Vietnam possessed approximately 1,500 anti-aircraft weapons, most of which were of the light 37 and 57mm variety. Within one year, however, the U.S. estimated that the number had grown to over 5,000 guns, including 85 and 100mm radar-directed weapons. That estimate was later revised downward from a high of 7,000 in early 1967 to less than a thousand by 1972. (Note: The 1972 figure might also reflect the redeployment of anti-aircraft battalions after the end of Rolling Thunder to the defense of the Ho Chi Minh trail in Laos. See Operation Commando Hunt.) Regardless, during Rolling Thunder, 80 percent of U.S. aircraft losses were attributed to anti-aircraft fire.

Backing up the guns were the fighter aircraft of the VPAF, which originally consisted of only 53 MiG-17 fighter aircraft. Though considered antiquated by the Americans when compared to their supersonic jets, the North Vietnamese turned their aircraft's weaknesses into strengths. They were fast enough for hit and run ambush operations and they were also maneuverable enough to shock the American fighter community by shooting down more advanced F-8 Crusaders and F-105 Thunderchiefs, which had to quickly develop new tactics. The newer missile-armed F-4 Phantom would become the Americans' primary dogfighting platform.

The simple appearance of MiGs could often accomplish their mission by causing American pilots to jettison their bomb loads as a defensive measure. (Note: During the last four months of 1966, 192 American aircraft were intercepted by MiGs. Of these, 107 (56 percent) were forced to jettison their bombs. Morocco, p. 142.) In 1966, the MiG-17 were joined by more modern Soviet-built Mikoyan-Gurevich MiG-21s, which could fight on a more equal footing with the American aircraft. By 1967, the North Vietnamese Air Force was maintaining an interceptor force of 100 aircraft, many of which were based on Chinese airfields and out of reach of American air attack.

The northern economy was decentralized for its protection, and large factories, located in the heavily populated Red River Delta region, were broken up and scattered into caves and small villages throughout the countryside. In the more heavily bombed southern panhandle, entire villages moved into tunnel complexes for the duration. Food shortages in North Vietnam became widespread, especially in the urban areas, as rice farmers went into the military or volunteered for service repairing bomb damage. When the nation's transportation system came under attack, destroyed bridges were repaired or replaced by dirt fords, ferries, and underwater or pontoon bridges. The system proved to be durable, well built, easily repaired, and practically impossible to shut down.

Perhaps North Vietnam's ultimate resource was its population. During 1965, 97,000 North Vietnamese civilians volunteered to work full-time in repairing the damage inflicted by U.S. bombs. Another 370,000–500,000 civilians worked part-time. When the nation's lines of communication came under attack, railroad supply trains and truck convoys were split into smaller elements which traveled only at night. The logistical effort was supported by citizens on sampans, driving carts, pushing wheelbarrows, or man-portering supplies on their backs to keep the war effort going. They were motivated by slogans like "Each kilogram of goods...is a bullet shot into the head of the American pirates."

=== China ===
Operation Rolling Thunder prompted the Chinese Communist Party (CCP) in April 1965 to accelerate war preparations in major cities, particularly air defense and citizen militia drills. The CCP began emphasizing that, in addition to preparing for the risk of U.S. bombing of China, the Chinese people should be prepared to handle the worst-case scenario of having to fight on Chinese soil.

== Air combat ==
=== SAMs and Wild Weasels ===
Between 1964 and early 1965, U.S. aircraft flew at an altitude of 4−5 kilometers, above the 3 kilometer ceiling of North Vietnamese AAA. On 24 July 1965, four USAF F-4C Phantoms took part in an airstrike against the Dien Bien Phu munitions storage depot and the Lang Chi munitions factory west of Hanoi. One was shot down and three were damaged by SA-2 missiles. This was the first time that U.S. aircraft had been attacked by SAMs.

After two days, President Johnson ordered attacks on all known SA-2 positions, which had also been discovered outside the 30-mile exclusion zone. The strikes, known as Operation Spring High, started on the morning of 27 July and involved 48 F-105s. The Vietnamese anticipated the attacks; the positions were dummies – the "missiles" were white-painted bundles of bamboo – defended by 23 mm and 37 mm AAA. The U.S. had destroyed two false targets; in exchange, six aircraft and five pilots were lost, and over half of the remaining aircraft were damaged.

The U.S. adopted new tactics and increased the use of electronic radar jamming; it estimated SAM effectiveness was one kill in 30 launches at the end of 1966, and one in 50 at the end of 1967. Approaching at low altitude — particularly below cloud cover — allowed pilots to visually detect missile launches and evade while the missile was still relatively slow. Jamming permitted higher approach altitudes, and higher pull-out altitudes after a bombing dive which limited exposure to the heaviest ground fire.

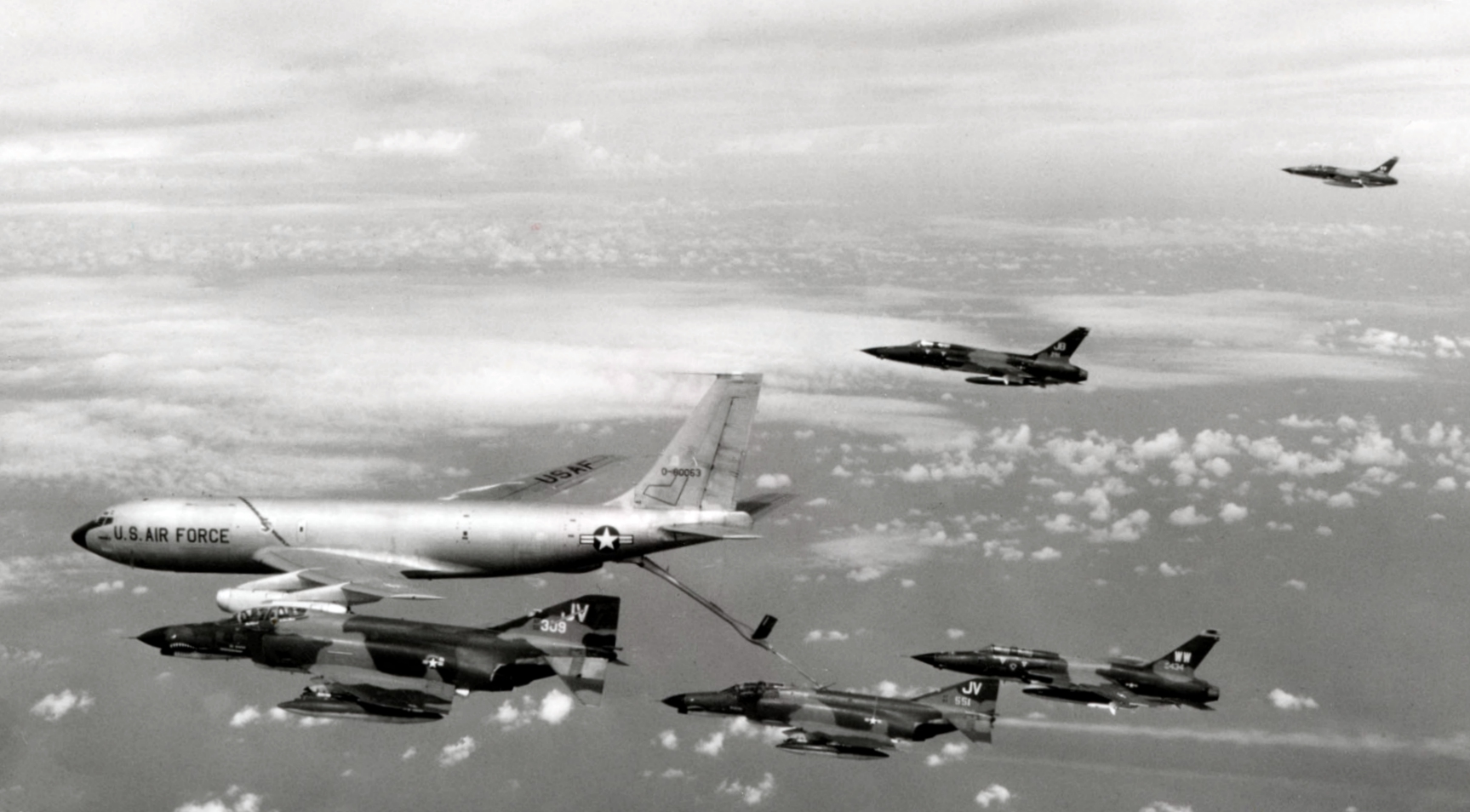
A USAF "Iron Hand" SAM-suppression team late in the war

The gradual escalation gave North Vietnam time to develop an air defense system for the Red River Delta with 200 radar facilities coordinating SAMs, AAA, and MiGs. By 1967, North Vietnam had an estimated 150 SAM launchers in 25 battalions, rotating around 150 sites. In 1967, the U.S. lost 248 aircraft (145 Air Force, 102 Navy, and one Marine Corps).

The U.S. responded by reinforcing the large fighter-bomber strikes — known as "force packages" in the Air Force and multi-carrier "Alpha strikes" in the Navy — with support aircraft. The strikes were preceded by "Iron Hand" air defense suppression (SEAD) missions conducted by F-105 Wild Weasel hunter/killer teams. The Wild Weasels carried sensors to detect and locate the emissions associated with SAM guidance and control radars and self-protection electronic countermeasures (ECM). They were armed with the AGM-45 Shrike anti-radiation missiles, developed by the Navy development, which homed in on active radar; the Shrike had shorter range than the SA-2. A sophisticated cat and mouse game then ensued between North Vietnamese radar operators and the Wild Weasel pilots.

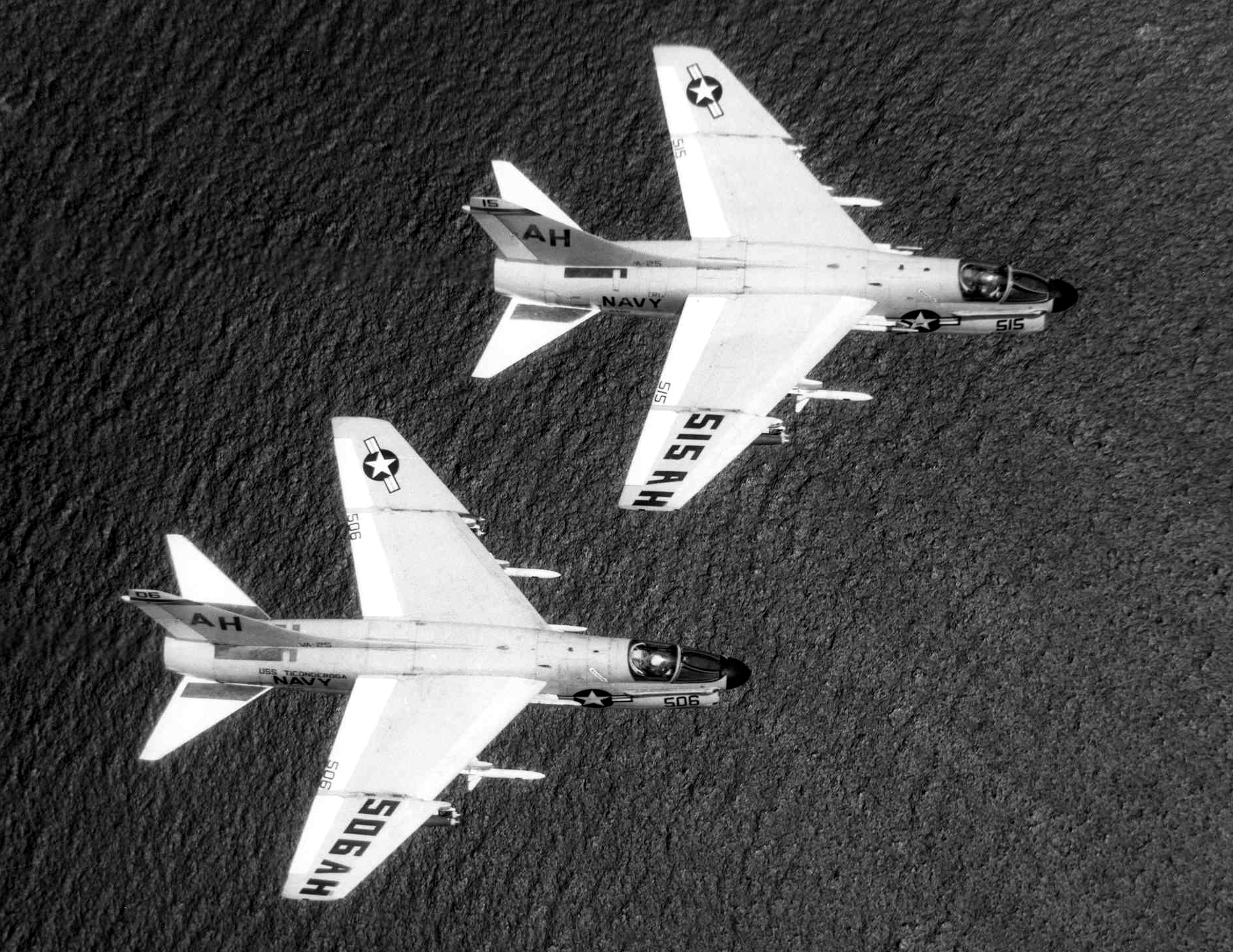
U.S. Navy A-7B Corsairs armed with Shrike anti-radiation missiles, 1969

Next came the bomb-laden strike aircraft protected by escort fighters (Combat Air Patrol or MIGCAP) and electronic jamming aircraft to degrade enemy radar. New ECM devices had hurriedly been deployed to protect aircraft from missile attacks, but frequently broke down because of climate conditions in Southeast Asia. Additional support came from KC-135 aerial tankers and Search and Rescue (SAR) helicopters escorted by A-1 Skyraiders.

The Vietnamese were able to adapt to some of these tactics. The USSR upgraded the SA-2 radar several times to improve ECM resistance. They also introduced a passive guidance mode, whereby the tracking radar could lock on the jamming signal itself and guide missiles directly towards the jamming source. This also meant the SAM site's tracking radar could be turned off, which prevented Shrikes from homing in on it. Some new tactics were developed to combat the Shrike. One of them was to point the radar to the side and then turn it off briefly. Since the AGM-45 Shrike was a relatively primitive anti-radiation missile, it would follow the beam away from the radar and then simply crash when it lost the signal (after the radar was turned off). SAM crews could briefly illuminate a hostile aircraft to see if the target was equipped with a Shrike. If the aircraft fired one, the Shrike could be neutralized with the side-pointing technique without sacrificing any SA-2s. Another tactic was a "false launch" in which missile guidance signals were transmitted without a missile being launched. This could distract enemy pilots, or even occasionally cause them to drop ordnance prematurely to lighten their aircraft enough to dodge the nonexistent missile.

At the same time, both the evasion maneuvers were used, and intensive bombardments of the identified SAM firing positions were organized. Under these conditions, measures to observe the regime of camouflage and radio silence became especially important. After the combat launches, the anti-aircraft missile division was to leave the region immediately, otherwise it was destroyed by a bomb-assault strike. Until December 1965, according to American data, eight SA-2s systems were destroyed. However, not infrequently American aircraft fiercely bombed dummy positions that were equipped with fake missiles made of bamboo. Soviet and Vietnamese calculations claimed the destruction of 31 aircraft, the Americans acknowledged the loss of 13 aircraft. According to the memoirs of Soviet advisers, on average before an anti-aircraft missile unit was put out of action it destroyed five to six American aircraft.

From mid-1966 until the end of 1967, President Johnson continued to dole out sensitive targets one by one to the generals while simultaneously trying to placate the doves in Congress and within his own administration with periodic cutbacks and half-hearted peace initiatives. (Note: The most complete treatment of the search for peace is Allen E. Goodman, The Search for a Negotiated Settlement of the Vietnam War.) In the end, this erratic course satisfied no one and did little to alter the course of the war.

The nature of the targets and the risks involved in striking (and re-striking) them began to take a toll. Chief of Naval Operations David McDonald reported to his co-chiefs after a trip to South Vietnam in September 1966, that Rolling Thunder aircrews were angered with the targeting process and that they faulted the campaign due to "guidelines requiring repetitive air programs that seemed more than anything else to benefit enemy gunners." During 1967, the second full year of Rolling Thunder operations, 362 U.S. aircraft had been lost over North Vietnam (208 Air Force, 142 Navy, and 12 Marine Corps).

During the war, the Soviet Union delivered 95 SA-2 systems and 7,658 missiles to the Vietnamese. 6,806 missiles were launched, destroyed, or found to be faulty. According to the Vietnamese, the SA-2 shot down 31% of all downed US aircraft. By comparison, air-defense guns brought down 60% and 9% were shot down by MiG fighters. The higher rate of anti-aircraft artillery is partially caused by the fact gun units received data from the S-75 radar stations that significantly improved their effectiveness.

=== MiGs and interdiction ===
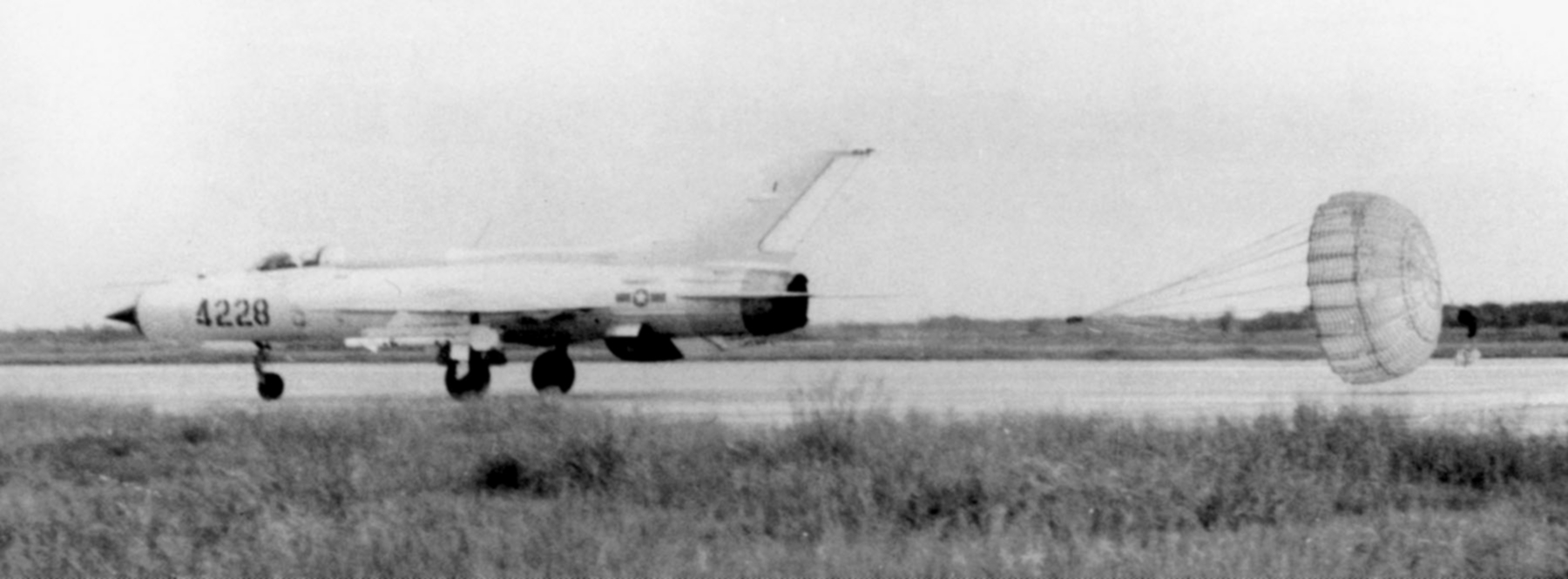
A missile-armed VPAF MiG-21PF landing, using its drogue parachute

Rolling Thunder reached the last stage of its operational evolution during 1967 and 1968. The chief purpose of the American air effort in the higher Route Packages of North Vietnam was slowly transformed into that of interdicting the flow of supplies and materiel and the destruction of those segments of the north's infrastructure that supported its military effort. In 1965, the VPAF had only 36 MiG-17s and a similar number of qualified pilots, which increased to 180 MiGs and 72 pilots by 1968. The Americans have at least 200 USAF F-4s and 140 USAF F-105s, plus at least 100 U.S. Navy aircraft (F-8s, A-4s and F-4s) which operated from the aircraft carriers in the Gulf of Tonkin, plus scores of other support aircraft. The Americans had a multiple numerical advantage.

Although most U.S. aircraft losses continued to be inflicted by anti-aircraft fire, U.S. Air Force F-105s and Navy A-4s increasingly encountered SAMs and MiGs. North Vietnamese fighters also became a particular problem because of the lack of radar coverage in the Red River Delta region, which allowed the MiGs to surprise the strike forces. Airborne early warning aircraft had difficulty detecting the fighters at low altitudes and the aircraft themselves were difficult to see visually.

VPAF flew their interceptors with superb guidance from ground controllers, who positioned the MiGs in perfect ambush battle stations. The MiGs made fast and devastating attacks against US formations from several directions (usually the MiG-17s performed head-on attacks and the MiG-21s attacked from the rear). After shooting down a few American planes and forcing some of the F-105s to drop their bombs prematurely, the MiGs did not wait for retaliation, but disengaged rapidly. This "guerrilla warfare in the air" proved very successful. In December 1966 the MiG-21 pilots of the 921st FR downed 14 F-105s without any losses.

While F-105s did score 27 air-to-air victories, the overall exchange ratio was near parity. On 2 January 1967, the Americans sprang a surprise on the MiGs when they launched Operation Bolo. F-4 Phantoms, using the same radio call signs, direction of approach, altitude, and speed as a typical flight of bomb-laden F-105s, lured a group of MiG-21s toward what the MiG pilots thought would be easy prey. The result was seven MiG-21s shot down within 12 minutes for no U.S. losses.

The U.S. Air Force and the US Navy continued to have expectations of the F-4 Phantom, assuming that the massive arms, the perfect on-board radar, the highest speed and acceleration properties, coupled with the new tactics would provide "Phantoms" an advantage over the MiGs. But in encounters with lighter VPAF's MiG-21, the F-4 began to suffer defeats. From May to December 1966, the U.S. lost 47 aircraft in air battles, destroying only 12 enemy fighters.

Although the MiG-21 lacked the long-range radar, missiles, and heavy bomb load of its contemporary multi-mission U.S. fighters, with its RP-21 Sapfir radar it proved a challenging adversary in the hands of experienced pilots, especially when used in high-speed hit-and-run attacks under GCI control. MiG-21 intercepts of F-105 strike groups were effective in downing US aircraft or forcing them to jettison their bomb loads.

Later in the year, the U.S. launched its most intense and sustained attempt to force North Vietnam into peace negotiations. Almost all of the targets on the Joint Chiefs' list had been authorized for attack, including airfields that had been previously off limits. Only central Hanoi, Haiphong, and the Chinese border area remained prohibited from attack. A major effort was made to isolate the urban areas by downing bridges and attacking LOCs. Also struck were the Thai Nguyen steel complex (origin of the Pardo's Push), thermal and electrical power plants, ship and rail repair facilities, and warehouses. North Vietnamese MiGs entered the battle en masse, as their capital was threatened and kill ratios fell to one U.S. aircraft lost for every two MiGs. During 1968, MiGs accounted for 22 percent of the 184 American aircraft (75 Air Force, 59 Navy, and five Marine Corps) lost over the north. As a result, operations against the last of North Vietnam's airfields, previously off-limits to attack, were authorized.

Despite the best interdiction efforts of Rolling Thunder, however, the VC and PAVN launched their largest offensive thus far in the war on 30 January 1968, striking throughout South Vietnam during the lunar new year holiday. The Tet Offensive concluded as a military disaster for North Vietnam and the VC, but it also adversely affected U.S. public opinion, which in turn affected the will of Washington. (Note: Contrary to opinion, the U.S. public still supported the American effort in South Vietnam. It was disturbed by the magnitude of the offensive only in that its military and civilian leadership had constantly reassured them that American goals were being achieved and that there was "a light at the end of the tunnel." Tet merely served notice to the administration that the public wanted either victory or an end to the open-ended commitment of American resources and manpower. Dougan, pp. 68–70.) Fortunately for North Vietnam, many U.S. bombing advocates (including Air Force Chief of Staff McConnell) did not want to risk the one aircraft capable of delivering a lot of bombs in bad weather—the B-52. Without them, there was little that could be done over the north in response to Tet, since bad weather minimized fighter operations until the beginning of April.

== End of the line ==
=== Opposition ===
Writing after the war, Robert McNamara stated that by spring 1967 he and other civilians in the administration had become convinced that both Rolling Thunder and the ground war in South Vietnam were not working. McNamara claimed that he and others within the administration continuously opposed the Joint Chiefs' recommendations for an increased tempo of bombing and the loosening of target restrictions. The generals found themselves on the horns of a dilemma of their own making. They continuously claimed that the campaign was working, yet they also had to continuously demand greater latitude in order to make the campaign succeed. (Note: The military men could not back down. Unless given the opportunity to demonstrate the full potential of their services, they feared the loss of future roles and diminished budgets. Morocco, p. 153.) The limited goals entailed in American foreign policy and the military's goal of total victory were simply not reconcilable. The conundrum had then become how to defeat North Vietnam without defeating North Vietnam.

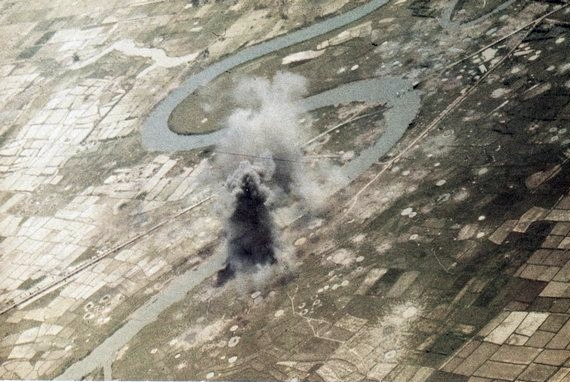
A U.S. Navy strike photograph from Carrier Air Wing 21 (CVW-21) showing burning supply barges in North Vietnam

On 9 August 1967 the Senate Armed Services Committee opened hearings on the bombing campaign. Complaints from the armed services had sparked the interest of some of the most vocal hawks on Capitol Hill. The military chiefs testified before the committee, complaining about the gradual nature of the air war and its civilian-imposed restrictions. It was obvious that McNamara, the only civilian subpoenaed and the last to testify before the committee, was to be the scapegoat. The Secretary of Defense marshaled his objections to an indiscriminate air war and rebutted the charges of the military chiefs. He admitted that there was "no basis to believe that any bombing campaign...would by itself force Ho Chi Minh's regime into submission, short, that is, of the virtual annihilation of North Vietnam and its people."

It had now become clear to Johnson that McNamara had become a liability to the administration. In February 1968, McNamara resigned and was replaced by Clark Clifford, who was chosen because of his personal friendship with Johnson and his previous opposition to McNamara's suggestions that the number of troops in the South Vietnam be stabilized and that Rolling Thunder be ended. McNamara's position, however, was almost immediately taken up by Secretary of State Dean Rusk, until then an ardent advocate of the bombing campaign. Rusk proposed limiting the campaign to the panhandle of North Vietnam without preconditions and awaiting Hanoi's reaction. Within months Clifford too began to adopt the views of the man he had replaced, gradually becoming convinced that the U.S. had to withdraw from an open-ended commitment to the war.

Disappointed by perceived political defeats at home and hoping that Hanoi would enter into negotiations, Johnson announced on 31 March 1968, that all bombing north of the 19th parallel would cease. As a result, the Air Force and Navy began to pour all the firepower they had formerly spread throughout North Vietnam into the area between the 17th and 19th parallels. The Air Force doubled the number of sorties sent into Route Package One to more than 6,000 per month with the campaign concentrated on interdiction "choke points", road closing, and truck hunting. Once again, the military commanders were faced with a familiar dilemma: having opposed the bombing cutback, they then decided that the new policy had a lot of merit, especially when considering the alternative of no bombing at all. The North Vietnamese responded by doubling the number of anti-aircraft batteries in the panhandle, but most of their SAM batteries remained deployed around Hanoi and Haiphong.

Hanoi, which had continuously stipulated that it would not conduct negotiations while the bombing continued, finally agreed to meet with the Americans for preliminary talks in Paris. As a result, Johnson declared that a complete bombing halt over North Vietnam would go into effect on 1 November 1968, just prior to the U.S. presidential election. Although the bombing halt was to be linked to progress in the peace talks, the Joint Chiefs were skeptical that the administration would reopen the bombing campaign under any circumstances. They were correct. North Vietnam was not the target of intense bombing again for another three and a half years.

=== Conclusions ===
F-105 Thunderchief dropping ordnance during Rolling Thunder

Between March 1965 and November 1968, USAF aircraft had flown 153,784 attack sorties against North Vietnam, while the Navy and Marine Corps had added another 152,399. On 31 December 1967, the Department of Defense announced that 864,000 tons of American bombs had been dropped on North Vietnam during Rolling Thunder, compared with 653,000 tons dropped during the entire Korean War and 503,000 tons in the Pacific theater during the Second World War.

The CIA privately estimated that damage inflicted in the north totaled $500 million. They also estimated that by April 1967, 52,000 casualties including 21,000 deaths had occurred as a result of the operation. The CIA estimated that 75 percent of casualties were involved in military or quasi-military operations including civilians working on military and logistical operations. 45 percent of casualties in 1965 were civilians and logistics workers while that figure was 80 percent in 1966. In June 1967, they estimated 19,000 to 26,000 deaths including 13,000 to 17,000 civilian deaths were caused by the bombing. At the end of 1967, the CIA estimated 27,900 military and 48,000 civilians killed and wounded. The US government has estimated that 30,000 civilians were killed in total as a result of the operation.

Due to combat and operational circumstances, 506 USAF, 397 Navy and 19 Marine Corps aircraft were lost over or near North Vietnam. During the operation, of the 745 crewmen shot down, the USAF recorded 145 rescued, 255 killed, 222 captured (23 of whom died in captivity) and 123 missing. Figures on U.S. Navy and Marine Corps casualties were harder to come by. During the 44-month time frame, 454 naval aviators were killed, captured, or missing during combined operations over North Vietnam and Laos.

The number of aircraft lost by the U.S. is unconfirmed since the U.S. figures are also suspect. If a plane was badly damaged but managed to land, the U.S. did not count as a loss, even if it was a write-off.

Rolling Thunder had begun as a campaign of psychological and strategic persuasion, but it changed very quickly to interdiction, a tactical mission. Its ultimate failure had two sources, both of which lay with the civilian and military policy-makers in Washington: first, neither group could ever conceive that the North Vietnamese would endure under the punishment that they would unleash upon it. The civilians, moreover, did not understand air power well enough to know that their policies might be crippling it; second, the American military leadership failed to initially propose and develop, or later to adapt, an appropriate strategy for the war.

Along the way, Rolling Thunder also fell prey to the same dysfunctional managerial attitudes as did the rest of the American military effort in Southeast Asia. The process of the campaign became an end unto itself, with sortie generation as the standard by which progress was measured. Sortie rates and the number of bombs dropped, however, equaled efficiency, not effectiveness.

== Legacy ==
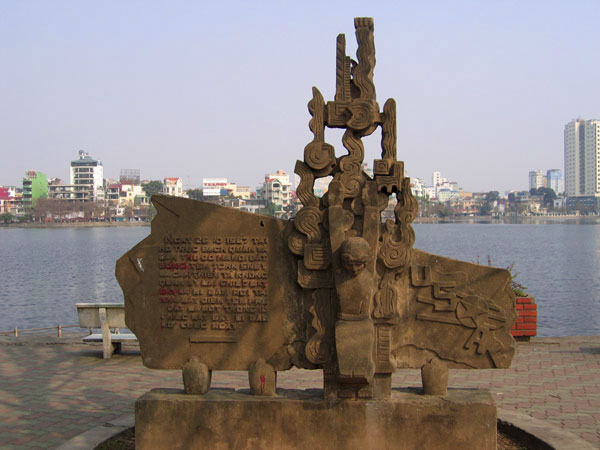
Memorial to the downing of 10 US jets on 26 October 1967, including that of John McCain. The monument reads, "On the day of 26 October 1967, a total of 10 American aircraft were shot down. Wounded J. McCain, a captain in the U.S. Navy, successfully catapulted from the downed aircraft, and at this point he was taken prisoner. His plane fell a few kilometers from this place at the Yen Phu Power Plant".

Studying the outcome of the events in Rolling Thunder, the Air Force and Navy came to very different conclusions on how to adapt. The Air Force noted that most of their air-to-air losses were due to unseen attacks from the rear, and thus the problem could be addressed through additional technology that would provide early warning of such attacks. They began modifying their aircraft with built-in M61 Vulcans for close-in use, adopted the Sidewinder and began upgrading them to improve their performance, and introduced new ground and air-based radars to provide an overall watch over the battlefield. The Navy concluded that the primary problem was that their pilots had not been given proper air combat maneuvering training, and were forced to rely on missiles that were not performing as expected. In 1968 the Navy introduced the TOPGUN program, a move that was welcomed by the F-8 pilots who had been campaigning for this all along.

Which of these two policies was more effective was immediately clear: during Rolling Thunder the US claimed a 3.7:1 kill ratio over the VPAF as a whole, but the Air Force's portion of that was closer to 2:1. By 1970 the Navy's kill ratio had climbed to 13:1. The Air Force, however, saw its ratio stagnate and actually decrease, for a short time being less than one. More critically, in 1970 the VPAF inflicted a kill on the USAF every three times they tried, while it took six missions to do the same against the Navy, and inversely, the VPAF lost a MiG every two engagements with the Air Force, but every time they engaged the Navy.

From April 1965 to November 1968, in 268 air battles conducted over North Vietnam, VPAF claimed to have shot down 244 US or RVNAF's aircraft, and they lost 85 MiGs. During the war, 13 VPAF's flying aces attained their status while flying the MiG-21 (compared to three in the MiG-17).

It was not until Operation Linebacker in 1972 that the problem became acute enough for the Air Force to finally take note. In the three months following the start of Linebacker in May 1972, the U.S. lost 48 aircraft, 21 to VPAF MiGs and 27 to improved ground defenses. In the same period, only 31 MiGs killed were claimed by U.S. aircraft and things worsened in the summer with 13 U.S. aircraft lost to MiGs and only 11 MiGs shot down were claimed. General John W. Vogt Jr., commander of the Seventh Air Force, reported to the USAF Chief of Staff that they were losing the air war. One immediate outcome was Operation Teaball, which reorganized the entire operational side of the Air Force's early warning systems, and tying them with the Navy's, so that every aircraft had a channel providing immediate warning of incoming aircraft. It was not until 1975, however, that the Air Force introduced Exercise Red Flag to match the performance of the Navy's TOPGUN.

== See also ==
- Action of 23 August 1967
- Aces of the Vietnam War
- Operation Menu
- Operation Freedom Deal
