= Vought F7U Cutlass =

US Navy carrier-based fighter-bomber aircraft in service 1951–1959

F7U Cutlass
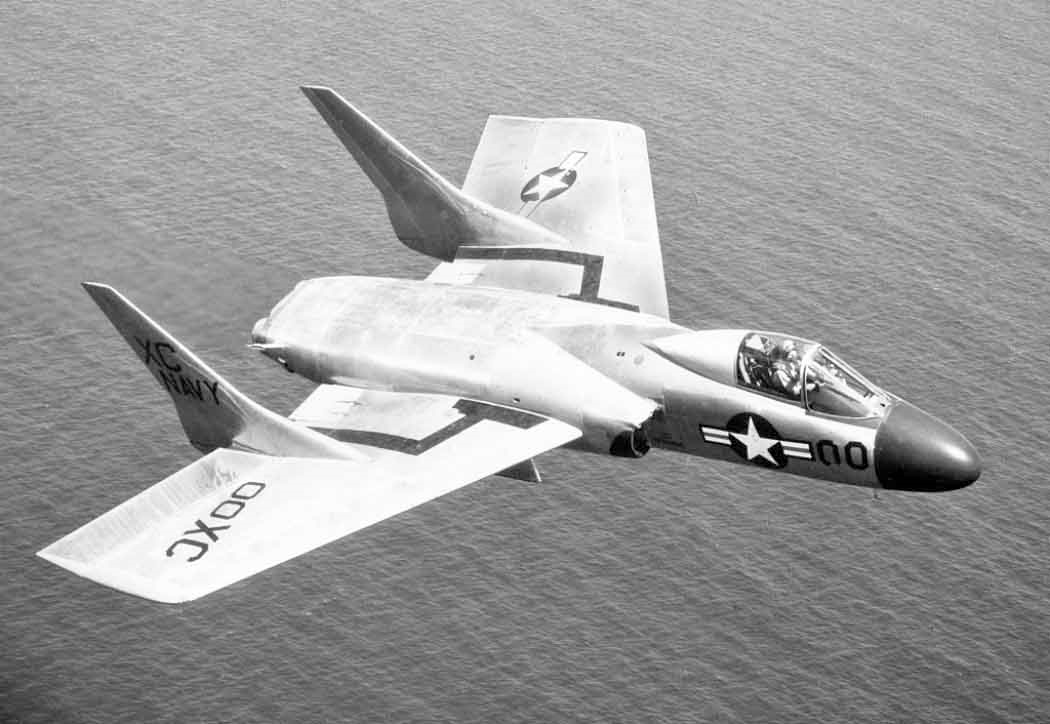
- A US Navy F7U Cutlass circa 1955

General information
- Type: Naval multirole fighter
- National origin: United States
- Manufacturer: Chance Vought
- Primary user: United States Navy
- Number built: 320

History
- Manufactured: 1948–1955
- Introduction date: July 1951
- First flight: 29 September 1948
- Retired: 2 March 1959

The Vought F7U Cutlass was a United States Navy carrier-based jet powered fighter and fighter-bomber designed and produced by the aircraft manufacturer Chance Vought. It was the first tailless production fighter in the United States as well as the Navy's first jet equipped with swept wings and the first to be designed with afterburners.

The Cutlass was developed from the mid 1940s to early 1950s as Vought's entry in a United States Navy competition. Their design team, which was influenced by design information obtained from Nazi Germany, opted for a tailless configuration paired with low aspect ratio swept wings, which was regarded as a radical departure from traditional aircraft design for the era. Vought's submission was favoured by Navy officials and was declared the winner in 1946. On 29 September 1948, the prototype performed its maiden flight; all three prototypes would be lost during the flight test program. It was initially powered by a pair of Westinghouse J34 turbojet engines which were relatively underpowered, contributing to its accident-prone nature; its unreliable hydraulic flight control system was also a source of difficulties.

The first production model of the Cutlass, F7U-1, entered service during July 1951. It was promptly followed by F7U-2 and F7U-3, improved models that were equipped with more powerful engines amongst other refinements. However, the Cutlass continued to suffer from frequent technical and handling problems throughout the aircraft's short service career. Accidents involving the type were responsible for the deaths of four test pilots and 21 other U.S. Navy pilots. Over one quarter of all Cutlasses built were destroyed in accidents; this high rate of accidents led to the type being withdrawn during the late 1950s despite having been in service for less than ten years.

== Development ==
=== Background ===
The Cutlass was developed in response to a competition organised by the United States Navy for a new carrier-capable day fighter that was launched on 1 June 1945. Specific requirements of the competition included the ability to fly at speeds of up to 600 miles per hour (970 km/h) and altitudes of up to 40,000 feet (12,000 m). Vought decided to respond with a relatively radical design for the era.

Vought's design team opted for an unconventional tailless configuration; this decision was heavily influenced by aerodynamic data obtained for various wartime projects undertaken by the German Arado and Messerschmitt companies that had been obtained at the close of World War II through German scientists who worked on the projects, though Vought designers denied any link to the German research at the time. Specifically, former Messerschmitt AG senior designer Woldemar Voigt, who supervised the development of numerous experimental jet fighters in Nazi Germany, contributed to its design with his experience in the development of the Messerschmitt P.1110 and P.1112 projects. The F7U was the last aircraft designed by Rex Beisel, who was responsible for the first fighter ever designed specifically for the U.S. Navy, the Curtiss TS-1 of 1922.

Vought's design was given the company type number V-346 and later received the official designation of F7U when the aircraft was announced to be the winner of the competition. Reviewing officials found the design, despite its unconventional nature, to pose an acceptable level of risk, less so than some of the competing submissions. During June 1946, an initial order for three XF7U-1 prototypes, each powered by a pair of Westinghouse J34 turbojet engines, was issued to the company. Construction took place at Vought's plant in Stratford, Connecticut.

=== Flight testing ===
On 29 September 1948, the first prototype performed its maiden flight from Naval Air Station Patuxent River in Maryland, piloted by Vought's chief test pilot, J. Robert Baker. Several issues were encountered during this initial flight. Shortly thereafter, the Navy announced that the aircraft would be named Cutlass. During subsequent flight testing, one of the prototypes attained a maximum speed of 625 mph (1,058 km/h).

During September 1949, Vought received a contract to modify the design and to produce 88 F7U-2 Cutlasses for the Navy. In May 1950, the Navy opted to halt F7U-1 production at 14 aircraft in favor of the updated model. None of the 14 F7U-1s built between 1950 and 1952 were approved for use in squadron service. On 7 July 1950, Vought test pilot Paul Thayer ejected from his burning prototype in front of an airshow crowd. Around this time, Vought repeatedly noted its dissatisfaction with the Westinghouse J34 engine to the Navy, alleging that the powerplant was responsible for delivery delays and an inability to perform certain flight tests.

Funding for the Cutlass was briefly cut before being reinstated during 1950. The extent of the aircraft's development difficulties were such that, according to aviation author Tommy Thomason, there were serious considerations towards cancelling the Cutlass entirely during the latter half of 1951. However, there were severe difficulties with the Westinghouse J40 that powered many of its potential competitors, and thus the Navy had no solid alternative to readily take its place. The introduction of more powerful steam catapults during 1952 also aided the programme considerably.

On 20 December 1951, the improved F7U-3 took off for its maiden flight; this model was a reconfiguration of the aircraft towards a more general purpose fighter configuration. Specific changes included the use of more powerful Westinghouse J46 engines, a stronger airframe that was enlarged by one-third, as well as better maintenance access via additional panels. Test pilot (and later, astronaut) Wally Schirra wrote in his autobiography that he considered the F7U-3 to be accident prone and a "widow maker". Several positive observations were also recorded by test pilots, such as it being a stable weapons platform, relatively maneuverable, fun to fly, and fairly sturdy with the strengthened airframe. Furthermore, test pilots gave particular praise for its high roll rate of 570 degrees/s, which was three times faster than most production jets at the time. Some pilots have suggested that inexperience with swept wing aircraft, as well as other innovative features of the aircraft, likely contributed to the poor accident record.

Early on, it was discovered that the Cutlass would gyrate after experiencing a stall. During one test flight, Lt. Morrey Loso's Cutlass exhibited such behavior, tumbling towards the ground following a stall. Upon letting go of the control stick to reach with both hands for the ejection handle, Loso's Cutlass promptly self-corrected. It was determined that normal recovery procedures did not apply to the Cutlass, a conclusion that was later confirmed via wind tunnel testing.

== Design ==
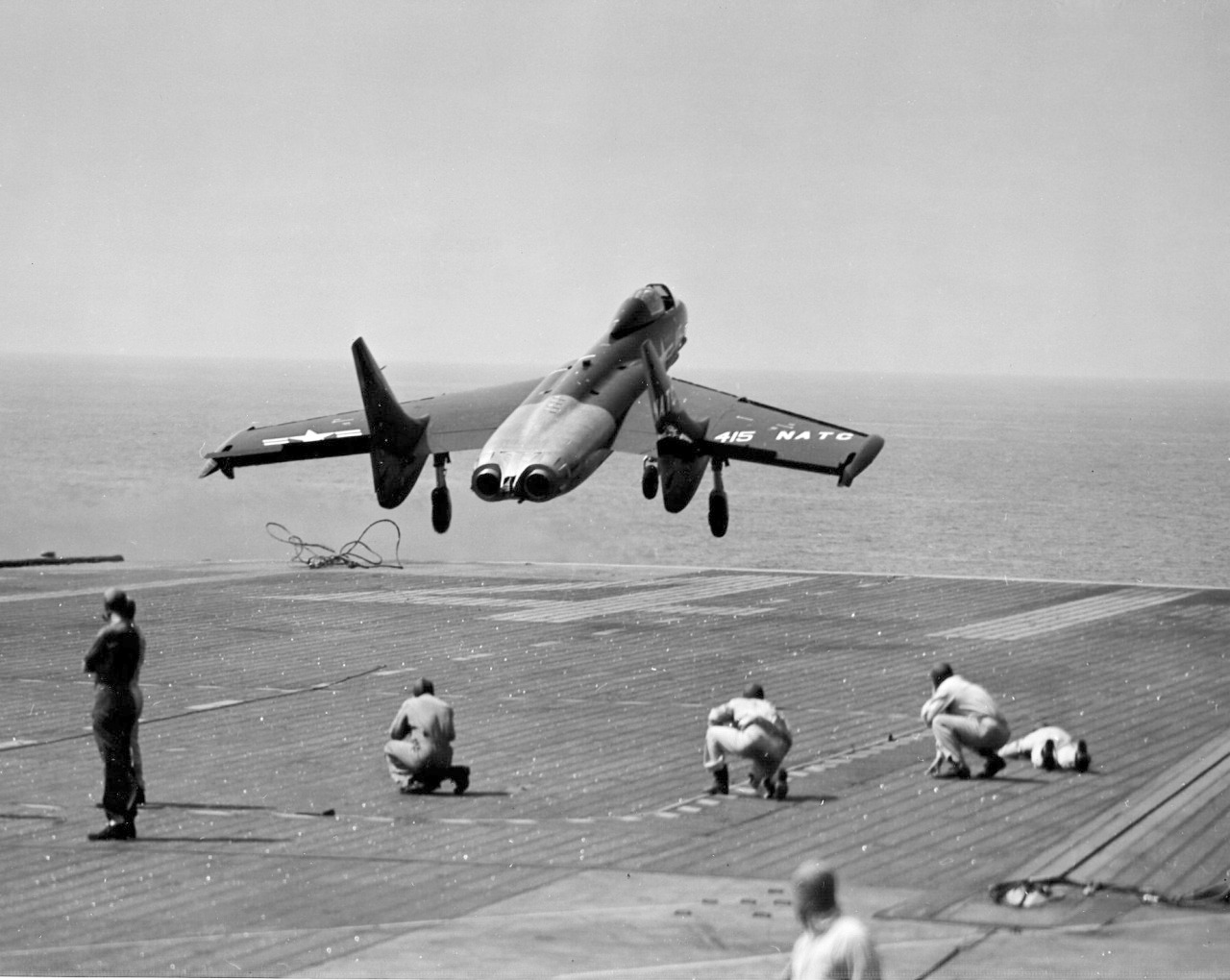
The first F7U-1 launching from the carrier Midway in 1951

The Vought F7U Cutlass was a carrier-based jet fighter and fighter-bomber. It featured broad chord, low aspect ratio swept wings, with twin wing-mounted tail fins either side of a short fuselage. There were no flaps. The cockpit, which was pressurized, was situated well forward to provide good visibility for the pilot during aircraft carrier approaches. The pilot was provisioned with an ejector seat. Common nicknames for the F7U amongst naval aviators included the "Gutless Cutlass", the "Ensign Eliminator" and, in kinder moments, the "Praying Mantis".

Both pitch and roll control was provided by elevons, though Vought referred to these surfaces as "ailevators" at the time. Slats were fitted to the entire span of the leading edge. The aircraft was provisioned with all-hydraulic flight controls; these provided artificial feedback so the pilot could feel aerodynamic forces acting on the aircraft. The hydraulic system operated at 3000 psi, twice that of other Navy aircraft; however, the system proved to be not ready for front-line service and experienced a high level of unreliability. Allegedly, this was at least partially due to many components having been intended for lower pressure hydraulic systems, resulting in a high rate of failure and thus exacerbating overall unreliability.

During flight testing, aviator John Glenn and various test pilots found the muzzle blast from the 20mm cannons caused the engines to flame out, however this was solved when the US Navy approached weapons expert George M. Chinn who designed a flame-out eliminator, a similar device to the Cutts compensator used on the Thompson submachine gun to divert the muzzle blast that solved the problem.

The very long nose landing gear strut required for high angle of attack takeoffs lifted the pilot 14 feet into the air and was fully steerable. The high position of the nose relative to the flight deck posed visibility difficulties for the pilot. Furthermore, the high stresses of barrier engagements, and side-loads imposed during early deployment carrier landings caused failure of the retract cylinder's internal down-locks, causing nose gear failure and resultant spinal injuries to the pilot. To help mitigate the loading forces exerted upon the nose landing gear actuator and mounting structure, Vought's design engineers added small turbines, powered by bleed air from the engines, to pre-spin on the nosegear tires to 90 mph prior to landing. Furthermore, an automatic fuel transfer system maintained the aircraft's center of gravity.

The initial models of the Cutlass were powered by a pair of Westinghouse J34 turbojet engines; these were widely considered to be underpowered and several pilots disparagingly claimed that they "put out less heat than Westinghouse's toasters." The J34 produced considerably less power than had been originally projected by Westinghouse, yet it was the only engine that could fit the airframe of the Cutlass without extensive reworking. Later production aircraft were provisioned with the more powerful Westinghouse J46 engine. The F7U-3M model was the first aircraft in US Navy service to be capable of firing the AAM-N-2 Sparrow I air-to-air missile. While it had been intended to equip the Cutlass with radar, such apparatus would be excluded due to weight constraints.

== Operational history ==
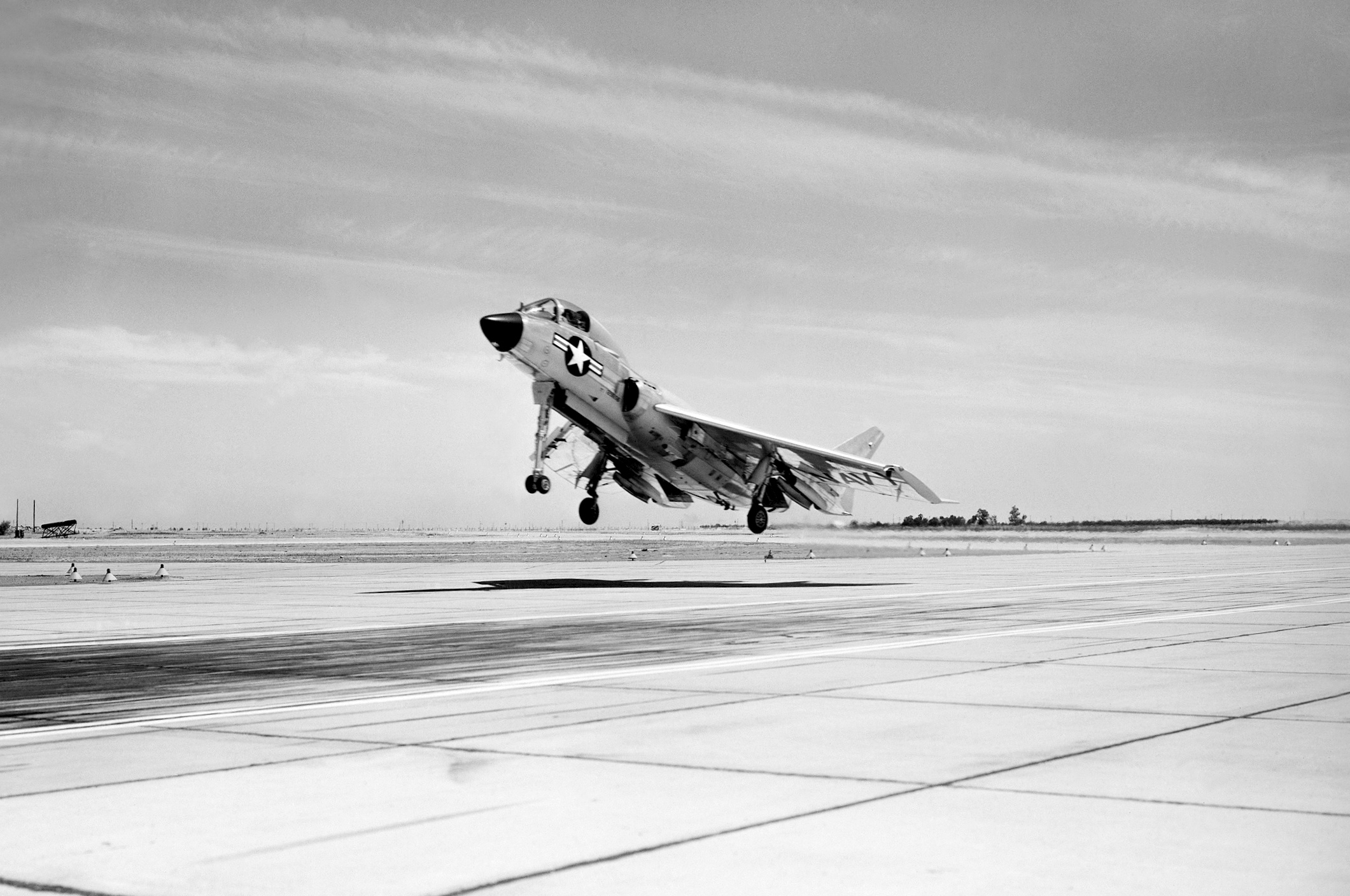
Vought F7U-3 Cutlass

Production orders were placed for the F7U-1 under a specification that remained relatively close to that of the prototypes, and further developed F7U-2 and F7U-3 versions with more powerful engines. Because of development problems with the powerplant, however, the F7U-2 would never be built, while the F7U-3 would incorporate many refinements that came out of flight tests of the -1. The first 16 F7U-3s were powered by non-afterburning Allison J35-A-29 engines. The -3, with its Westinghouse J46-WE-8B turbojets, would eventually become the definitive production version, a total of 288 aircraft equipping 13 U.S. Navy squadrons. Further development of the type came to an end shortly after flight testing of the more capable Vought F8U Crusader commenced.

The F7U's performance suffered due to a lack of sufficient engine thrust; consequently, its carrier landing and take-off performance was notoriously poor. The J35 was known to flame out in rain, a very serious fault. The first fleet squadron to receive F7Us was Fighter Squadron 81 (VF-81) in April 1954. Few squadrons made deployments with the type, and most "beached" them ashore during part of the cruise owing to operating difficulties. Those units known to have taken the type to sea were:

- VF-124, USS Hancock, August 1955 – March 1956. After pilot George Millard was killed in a Cutlass landing accident, the captain ordered every Cutlass off the ship and the squadron spent its Pacific cruise at the Atsugi naval air station in Japan
- VA-66, USS Ticonderoga, November 1955 – August 1956; after a pilot was injured after a nose gear collapse, the captain summoned the squadron leader, confined both he and all his pilots to quarters, and ordered the squadron ashore at Naval Air Station Port Lyautey.
- VA-86, USS Forrestal, January–March 1956 shakedown cruise
- VA-83, USS Intrepid, March–September 1956
- VA-116, USS Hancock, April–September 1957
- VA-151, USS Lexington, May–December 1956
- VA-212, USS Bon Homme Richard, August 1956 – February 1957
- Air Test and Evaluation Squadron 4 (VX-4), USS Shangri-La and USS Lexington

During 1957, Chance Vought analyzed the accident record and found that, with 78 accidents and a quarter of the airframes lost while accumulating 55,000 flight hours, the Cutlass had the highest accident rate of all Navy swept-wing fighters. Furthermore, according to Thomason, accidents involving the Cutlass were typically more severe than with other aircraft. The aircraft's poor safety record caused Vice Admiral Harold M. "Beauty" Martin, air commander of the United States Pacific Fleet, to replace the Cutlass with the Grumman F9F-8 Cougar; the decision was somewhat abrupt, with new aircraft continuing to be delivered for a time after this. Nevertheless, the outstanding order for 250 Cutlass A2U-1, a ground-attack variant, was soon cancelled. During the late 1950s, the Navy donated many of the now-surplus aircraft to various municipalities and schools to promote aviation.

=== Blue Angels ===
The Navy Flight Demonstration Squadron, the Blue Angels, flew two F7U-1 Cutlasses (BuNos 124426 & 124427) as a side demonstration during their 1953 show season in an effort to promote the new aircraft, but did not use them as part of their regular formation demonstration. Both the pilots and ground crews found the aircraft generally unsatisfactory, and it was apparent that the type was still experiencing multiple teething troubles. However, there were political pressures to adopt the Cutlass, both from several senior officers and from senators. Among the failures were landing gear failures, hydraulic failures, engine fires while in the air and, on one occasion, a landing gear door fell on a spectator grandstand but, through sheer luck, did not injure anyone. Following these incidents, the two Cutlasses were deemed unsuitable for demonstration flying and were flown to Naval Air Station Memphis, Tennessee, where they were abandoned to become aircraft maintenance instructional airframes for the Naval Technical Training Center. The Blue Angels would opt to use the Grumman F9F Panther in place of the Cutlass.

== Variants ==
XF7U-1
Three prototypes ordered on 25 June 1946 (BuNos 122472, 122473 & 122474). First flight, 29 September 1948; all three aircraft were destroyed in crashes.
F7U-1
The initial production version, 14 built. Powered by two J34-WE-32 engines.
F7U-2
Proposed version, planned to be powered by two Westinghouse J34-WE-42 engines with afterburner, but the order for 88 aircraft was cancelled.
XF7U-3
Designation given to one aircraft built as the prototype for the F7U-3, BuNo 128451. First flight: 20 December 1951.
F7U-3
The definitive production version, 180 built. Powered by two Westinghouse J46-WE-8B turbojets. The first sixteen aircraft, including the prototype, were powered by interim J35-A-29 non-afterburning engines.

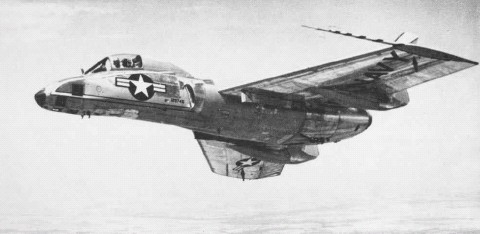
F7U-3P reconnaissance aircraft

F7U-3P
Photo-reconnaissance version, 12 built. With a 25 in (64 cm) longer nose and equipped with photo flash cartridges, none of these aircraft saw operational service, being used only for research and evaluation purposes.
F7U-3M
This missile capable version was armed with four AAM-N-2 Sparrow I air-to-air beam-riding missiles. 98 built of which 48 F7U-3 airframes under construction were upgraded to F7U-3M standard. An order for 202 additional aircraft was cancelled.
A2U-1
Designation given to a cancelled order of 250 aircraft to be used in the ground attack role.
V-362
Interceptor proposal as a rival to the F-3 Demon with XJ-40 Westinghouse Jet Engines.
V-366H
The Vought V-366H was a modernization project for the Vought F7U-3. The main design objectives were to reduce the overall dimensions of the aircraft while increasing the payload. Due to the unusual layout, both goals were achieved. With a slight increase in the wingspan, the length of the fuselage was significantly reduced, and the fuel reserves increased. Also installed is a launcher for unguided air-to-air missiles Mighty Mouse as on the F-89 Scorpion, while maintaining the cannon armament. Work on the V-366H was stopped due to the recognition of the F7U design as a whole outdated and the imminent need to create supersonic carrier-based fighters.
V-373
Proposal for a supersonic capable variant powered by a Pratt & Whitney J57.
V-389
Proposal for an improved performance attack aircraft based upon the A2U-1 Cutlass. The proposal featured a single Pratt and Whitney J57-P-4.

== Operators ==
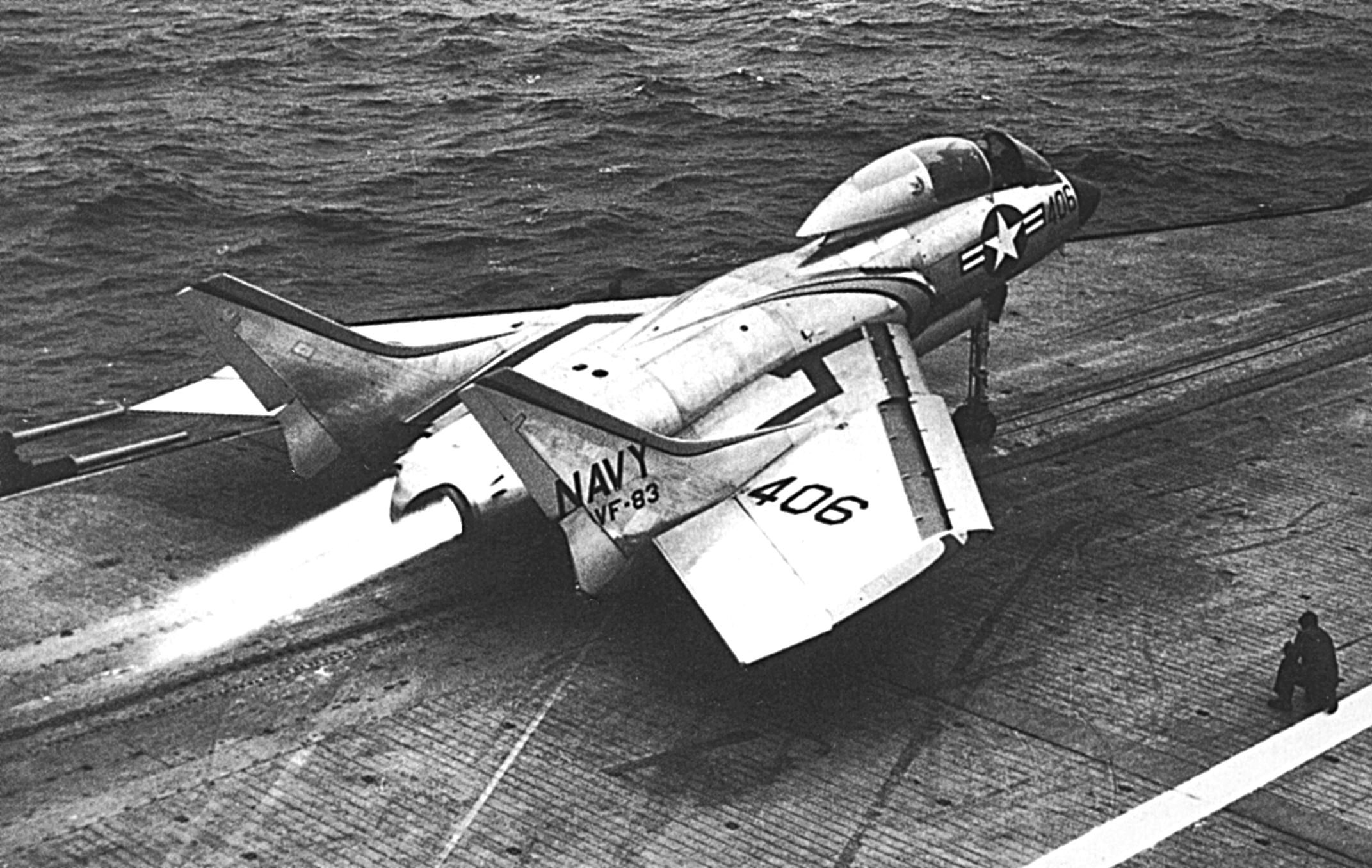
A VF-83 F7U-3 launches from the USS Intrepid in 1954 undergoing catapult testing during which its afterburners set deck planking ablaze

United States

- United States Navy
  - VC-3
  - VX-3
  - VX-4
  - VX-5
  - VA-12
  - VA-34
  - VF-81/VA-66
  - VF-83/VA-83
  - VA-86
  - VA-116
  - VF-122
  - VF-124
  - VA-126
  - VF-151/VA-151
  - VF-212/VA-212

== Accidents and incidents ==
External videos
- F-0837 Vought F7U Cutlass Carrier Crash on USS Hancock Video
- Vought F7U-3 Aircraft Carrier Crash Landings

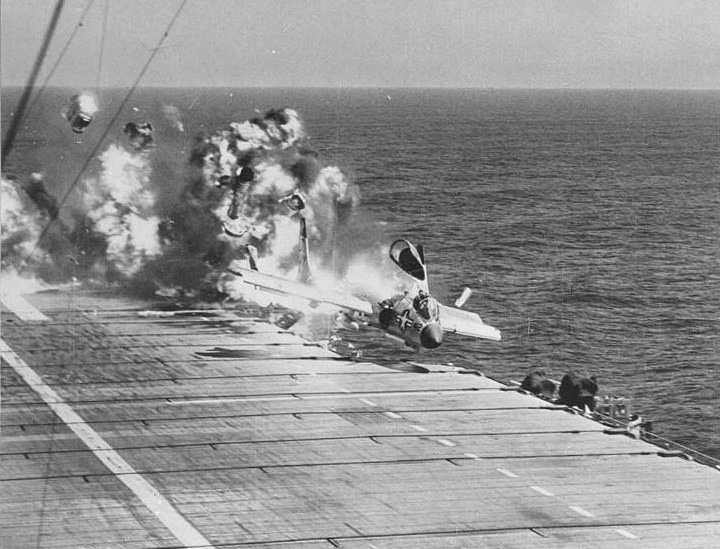
Ramp strike of Vought F7U-3 Cutlass BuNo 129595, Modex 412, of VF-124 on the USS Hancock on 14 July 1955. LCDR Jay T. Alkire (XO of USN's VF-124 "Stingrays") was killed in the crash, and several deck crew were injured.

- 26 July 1954: Pilot Lt Floyd Nugent ejected from a Cutlass armed with 2.75 inch rockets. The Cutlass continued to fly on and proceeded to circle the North Island of San Diego with its Hotel Del Coronado for 30 minutes, before it finally crashed close to shore.
- 11 December 1954: During an air demonstration at the christening of aircraft carrier USS Forrestal, pilot Lt J. W. Hood was killed when his F7U-3 had a malfunction with the wing locking mechanism and the aircraft crashed into the sea.
- 30 May 1955: Pilot Lt Cmdr Payton O. Harwell's Cutlass suffered an engine fire upon takeoff on his first flight in the aircraft. Harwell ejected and was rescued by a helicopter 15 minutes later.
- Pilot Tom Quillin's Cutlass took off as part of a flight of four Cutlasses. Quillin's aircraft had an electrical failure which forced him to abort his training mission and return to base.
- 14 July 1955: Pilot Jay T. Alkire was killed in a ramp strike on USS Hancock.
- 4 November 1955: Pilot Lt George Millard was killed when his Cutlass went into the cable barrier at the end of the flight deck landing area of USS Hancock. The nosegear malfunctioned and drove a strut into the cockpit which triggered the ejection seat and dislodged the canopy. Millard was launched 200 feet (61 m) forward and hit the tail of a parked A-1 Skyraider and later died of his injuries.

== Aircraft on display ==
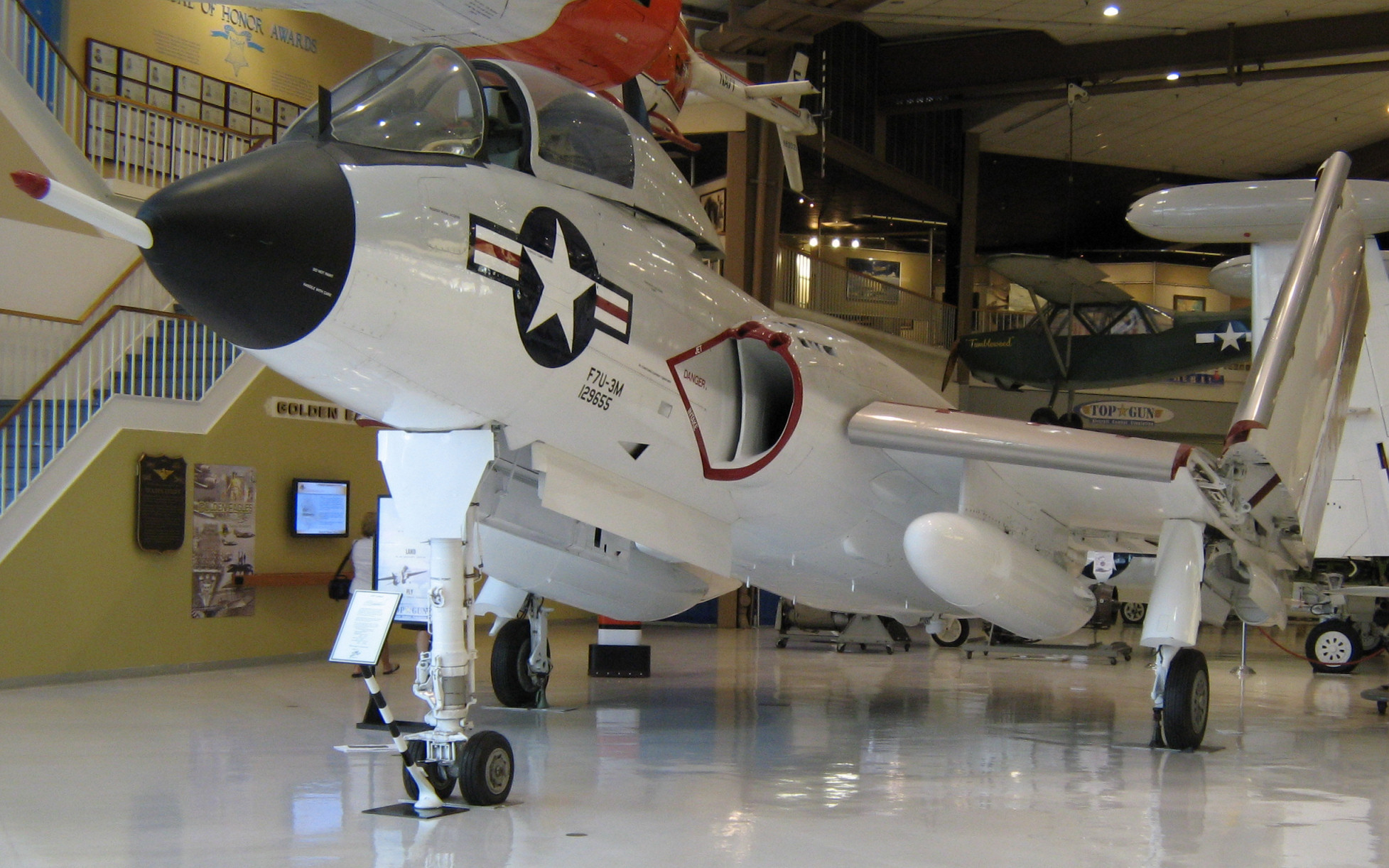
F7U-3 BuNo 129655 at the National Museum of Naval Aviation at NAS Pensacola, Florida

Seven F7U-3 Cutlass aircraft are known to have survived:

- 128451 – Phoenix, Arizona. Prototype F7U-3, fuselage only. Originally slated as a parts source for 129565, it has been transferred to Al Casby as a possible parts source for his Cutlass 129622. Prior to its storage at NAS North Island - San Diego, California it was formerly located at the New Mexico Institute of Mining and Technology in Socorro, New Mexico.
- 129554 – Falcon Field (Arizona). Ex VA-212. Purchased by Len Berryman from Geiger Field, Spokane, Washington in May 1958 and displayed outside the Berryman War Memorial Park in Bridgeport, Washington from 1958 until 1992. In June 1992 it was sold to Tom Cathcart of Ephrata, Washington. Sold in September 2014, and currently at Falcon Field, Arizona, for further restoration to airworthy condition by F7U historian Al Casby.
- 129565 – USS Midway Museum in San Diego, California. Ex VA-212.
- 129622 – Phoenix, Arizona. Ex VA-34 / VA-12 aircraft that was flown to Naval Air Reserve Training Unit (NARTU) Glenview, NAS Glenview, Illinois, where it was sporadically flown by Naval Air Reserve pilots and used for instruction of enlisted Naval Reserve aircraft maintenance personnel; ownership was then transferred to the Northbrook East Civic Association and the aircraft was moved to the Oaklane Elementary School for playground use in late November 1958. It was subsequently removed and dissected to be sold for its engines. Forward fuselage was part of Earl Reinert's collection in Mundelein, Illinois, while the rest of the aircraft went to J-46 dragster builder Fred Sibley in Elkhart, Indiana. Its components are currently reunited in the collection of F7U historian Al Casby.
- 129642 – Wings of Freedom Aviation Museum in Horsham, Pennsylvania. Ex VA-12 aircraft flown to NAS Willow Grove in May 1957 to take part in an air show. Upon arrival the aircraft was stricken from active duty. It was transferred to the Naval Reserve for use as a ground training aircraft, and eventually placed as a gate guard in front of the base on US Route 611. The airframe has only 326.3 hours total flight time. Currently undergoing cosmetic refurbishment for a return to display status.
- 129655 – National Naval Aviation Museum at NAS Pensacola, Florida. Ex VA-212. Cosmetically restored but incorrectly marked as an F7U-3M, this aircraft is a F7U-3. Formerly displayed at Griffith Park, California.
- 129685 – Under restoration for display at the MAPS Air Museum, Green, Ohio. The aircraft was in the collection of the late Walter Soplata in Newbury, Ohio.

== Specifications (F7U-3M) ==
Chance Vought F7U-1 3-view drawing

Data from Naval Fighters Number Six, Jane's Encyclopedia of Aviation

General characteristics

- Crew: 1
- Length: 41 ft 3.5 in (12.586 m)
- Wingspan: 39 ft 8 in (12.1 m) * Span wings folded: 22.3 ft (6.80 m)
- Height: 14 ft 0 in (4.27 m)
- Wing area: 496 sq ft (46.1 m^{2})
- Empty weight: 18,210 lb (8,260 kg)
- Gross weight: 26,840 lb (12,174 kg)
- Max takeoff weight: 31,643 lb (14,353 kg)
- Powerplant: 2 × Westinghouse J46-WE-8B after-burning turbojet engines, 4,600 lbf (20 kN) thrust each dry, 6,000 lbf (27 kN) with afterburner

Performance

- Maximum speed: 606 kn (697 mph, 1,122 km/h) at sea level with Military power + afterburner
- Cruise speed: 490 kn (560 mph, 910 km/h) at 38,700 ft (11,800 m) to 42,700 ft (13,000 m)
- Stall speed: 112 kn (129 mph, 207 km/h) power off at take-off

93.2 kn (173 km/h) with approach power for landing

- Combat range: 800 nmi (920 mi, 1,500 km)
- Service ceiling: 40,600 ft (12,375 m)
- Rate of climb: 14,420 ft/min (73.3 m/s) with Military power + afterburner
- Time to altitude: 20,000 ft (6,100 m) in 5.6 minutes

30,000 ft (9,144 m) in 10.2 minutes

- Wing loading: 50.2 lb/sq ft (245 kg/m^{2})
- Thrust/weight: 0.45
- Take-off run: in calm conditions 1,595 ft (486 m) with Military power + afterburner

Armament

- Guns: 4x 20mm M3 cannon, 180 rpg
- Hardpoints: 4 with a capacity of 5,500 lb (2,500 kg), with provisions to carry combinations of:
  - Missiles: 4 AAM-N-2 Sparrow I air-to-air missiles

Avionics

- AN/APQ-36 – Fire control radar

== See also ==
Aircraft of comparable role, configuration, and era

- Douglas F4D Skyray
- EFW N-20

Related lists

- List of tailless aircraft
- List of fighter aircraft
- List of United States Navy aircraft designations (pre-1962)
- List of military aircraft of the United States
