= Ramp strike =

Type of naval aviation accident

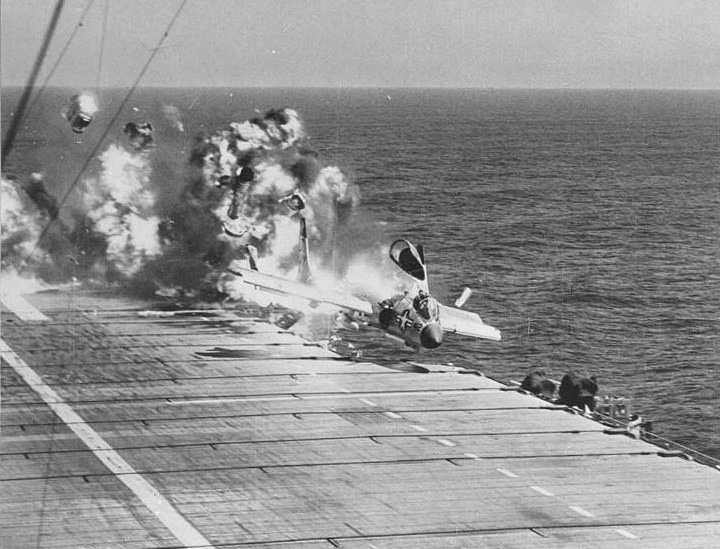
Ramp strike of a VF-124 Vought F7U-3 Cutlass, BuNo 129595, on the USS Hancock (CVA-19) on 14 July 1955

A ramp strike or rampstrike is when an aircraft coming to land aboard an aircraft carrier impacts the rear of the carrier, also called the ramp, below the level of the flight deck.

Damage from a ramp strike to the aircraft can range from broken hook or undercarriage to total loss of airframe; damage to the carrier can range from injured deck plating to a severe fire.

One of the most famous non-fatal ramp strike accidents occurred on 23 June 1951 when Cdr. George Chamberlain Duncan attempted to land a Grumman F9F-2 Panther on USS Midway in BuNo 125228, during carrier suitability tests in the Atlantic Ocean. The forward fuselage broke away and tumbled down the deck, which Duncan survived, suffering burns. Footage of this accident has been used in several films including Men of the Fighting Lady, Midway, and The Hunt for Red October.

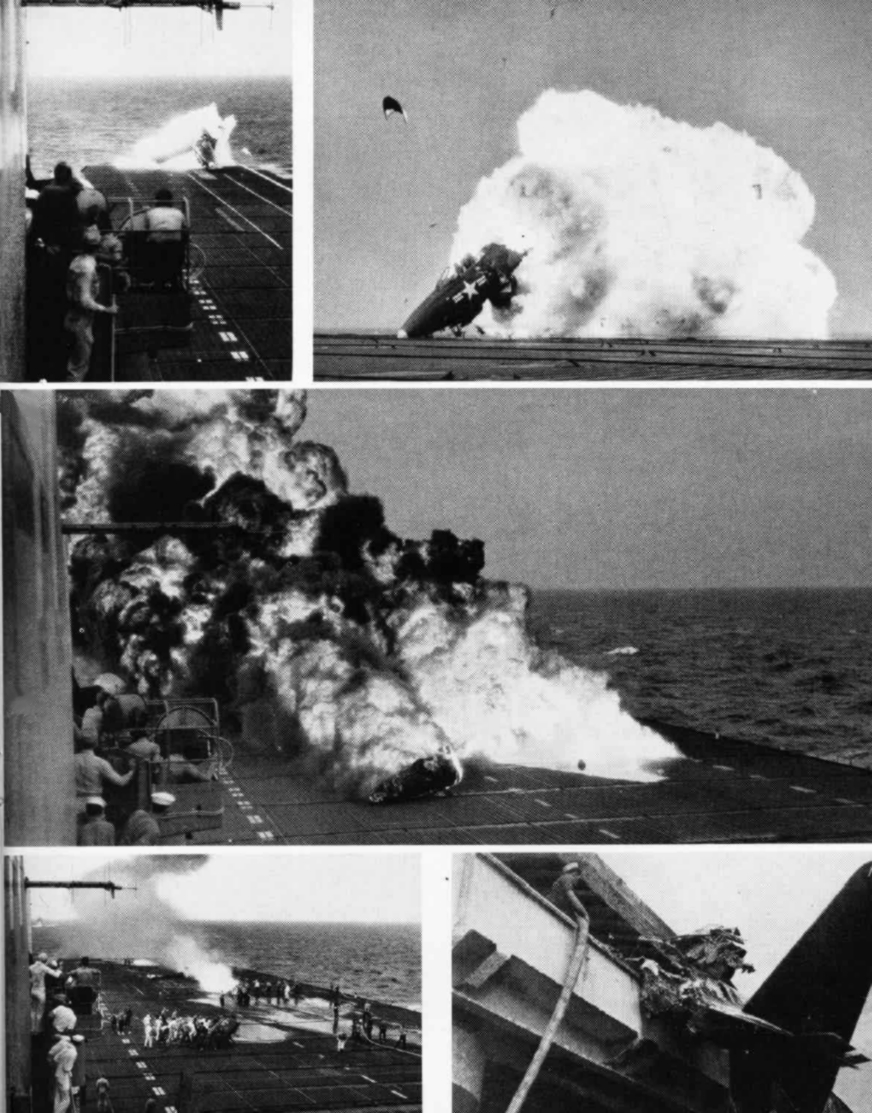
Grumman F9F Panther of Cdr. Duncan's crash on USS Midway, 23 June 1951.
