= VA-212 (U.S. Navy) =

Attack Squadron 212
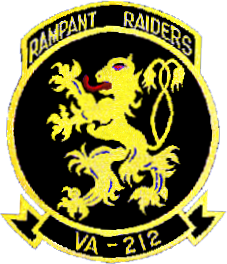
- VA-212 squadron patch
- Active: 20 June 1955 - 12 December 1975
- Country: United States
- Branch: United States Navy
- Nickname(s): Rampant Raiders
- Engagements: Second Taiwan Strait Crisis; Vietnam War

Attack Squadron 212 (VA-212), nicknamed the Rampant Raiders, was an aviation unit of the United States Navy. It was established as Fighter Squadron 212 (VF-212) on 20 June 1955, and redesignated as VA-212 on 1 April 1956. The squadron was disestablished on 12 December 1975.

== History ==
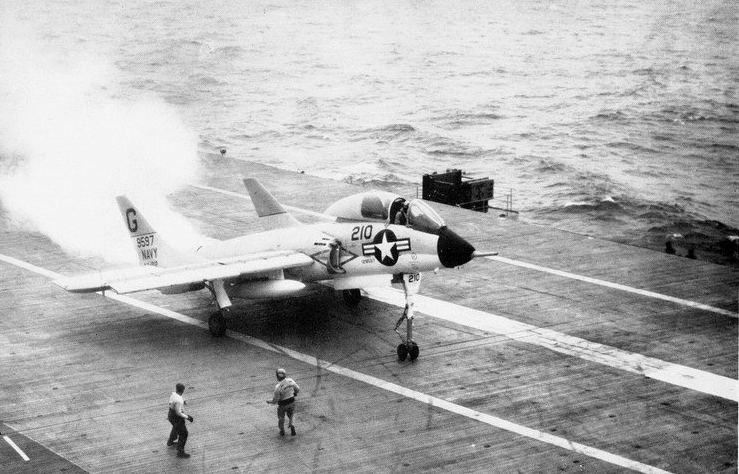
A F7U-3 of VA-212 on USS Bon Homme Richard, circa 1956.

- 6 June 1958: The squadron's commanding officer, Commander G. W. Staeheli, was killed in an aircraft accident.
- August–September 1958: VA-212, embarked on USS Lexington, operated in the Formosa Straits due to the tension surrounding the Chinese Communist shelling of the Quemoy Islands.
- April 1959: VA-212 became the first operational squadron to deploy with the AGM-12 Bullpup air-to-ground missile.
- March 1961: USS Lexington, with VA-212 embarked, was ordered to operate off the coast of Thailand as a result of the deteriorating position of Laotian government forces against the Communists. Units of Lexington’s air group flew reconnaissance missions over Laos while on station.
- 15 April 1962: VA-212, embarked on USS Hancock, operated off the coast of South Vietnam during the arrival of the first USMC advisory unit in South Vietnam.
- 16–20 May 1962: Following the continued successes of the Pathet Lao forces against Laotian government forces, particularly along the border with Thailand, the Thai government requested U.S. support. A unit of U.S Marines landed in Bangkok and moved by air to Udorn Royal Thai Air Force Base. VA-212, along with other units of CVG-21, embarked on Hancock, operated in the area and were available to provide air support for the Marines if required.
- September 1963: VA-212, embarked on Hancock, operated off the coast of Taiwan due to increased tensions between the People's Republic of China and the Republic of China.
- November 1963: Hancock, with VA-212 embarked, operated off the coast of South Vietnam following the coup that overthrew President Diem.
- 7 February 1965: Following the shelling of an American advisors’ compound at Pleiku by the Viet Cong, VA-212 participated in reprisal attacks against targets in North Vietnam. During the strikes, named Operation Flaming Dart, VA- 212's Skyhawks struck the Đồng Hới Barracks.
- 11 February 1965: VA-212's Skyhawks participated in Operation Flaming Dart II, reprisal attacks against the barracks at Chanh Hoa.
- March–May 1965: The squadron's Skyhawks participated in special operations in Southeast Asia, including the Operation Rolling Thunder campaign, strikes against designated military targets in North Vietnam.
- March 1966: Squadron aircraft participated in Operation Jackstay, providing combat air support for amphibious operations that cleared the Rung Sat Special Zone southeast of Saigon.
- 30 June 1966: Commander H. L. Smith, the squadron's commanding officer, was awarded the Silver Star for leading an air strike against the Bắc Giang POL facility.
- October–November 1966: During the squadron's training cycle, its aircraft were modified to operate the AGM-62 Walleye, becoming the first fleet unit equipped with the new system.
- 11 March 1967: The squadron's commanding officer, Commander H. L. Smith, conducted the first combat Walleye attack, striking the Sầm Sơn Army Barracks.

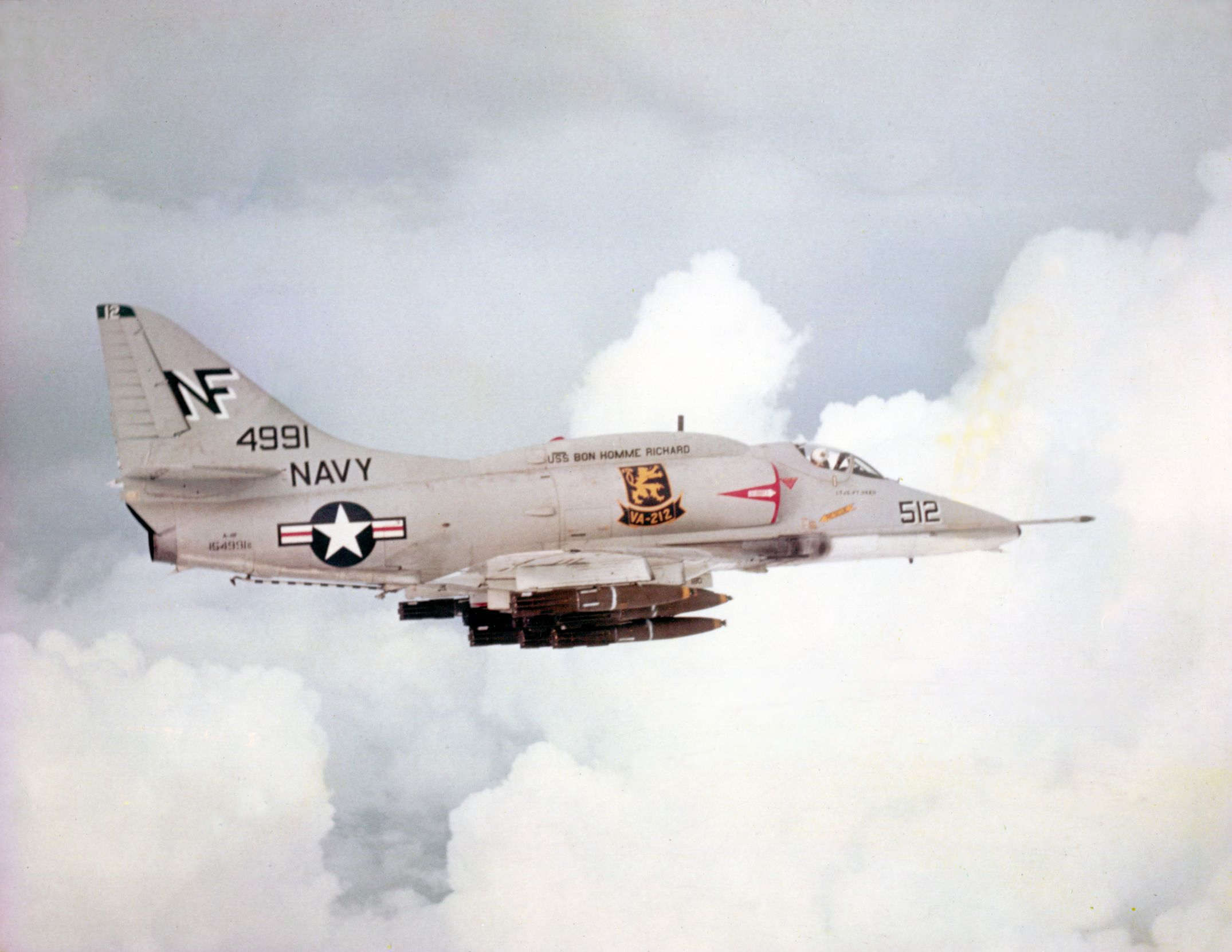
An A-4F of VA-212 over North Vietnam, 1968.

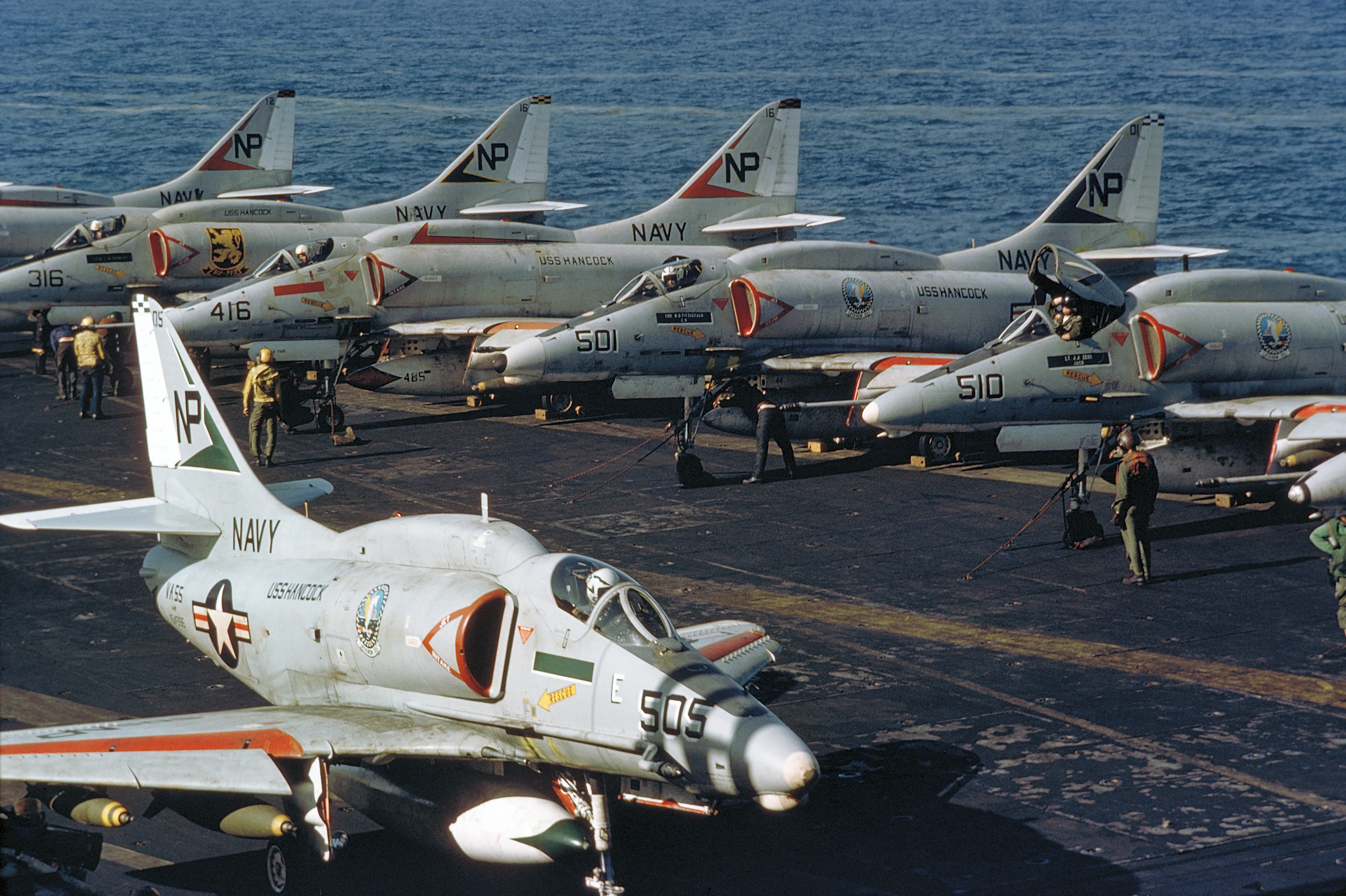
Armed A-4Fs including VA-212 on the USS Hancock in 1972

- 20 May 1967: Commander H. L. Smith was awarded the Navy Cross for his action during strikes on the Bắc Giang Thermal Power Plant on 19 and 20 May. He was killed in action during the mission on 20 May.
- February–March 1968: Squadron aircraft flew combat air support missions for the U.S. Marines under siege at Khe Sanh.
- April 1972: With the North Vietnamese invasion of South Vietnam, the Easter Offensive, the squadron concentrated its strikes in the area of An Lộc, South Vietnam. It provided combat air support for U.S. and South Vietnamese ground forces defending the city.
- May 1972: VA-212 participated in Operation Linebacker I, heavy air strikes against targets in North Vietnam.
- 25 May 1972: The squadron's commanding officer, Commander H. H. Strong, was killed in action when his aircraft was hit by antiaircraft fire during a strike near Vinh, North Vietnam.
- October–December 1973: With the outbreak of the Yom Kippur War and the initiation of the Arab oil embargo, Hancock, with VA- 212 embarked, was ordered to enter the Indian Ocean and operate in the Arabian Sea.

== Home port assignments ==
The squadron was assigned to these home ports, effective on the dates shown:

- NAS Moffett Field – 20 Jun 1955
- NAS Lemoore – 15 Sep 1961

== Aircraft assignment ==
The squadron first received the following aircraft on the dates shown:

- F7U-3M Cutlass – Jul 1955
- F7U-3 Cutlass – Aug 1955
- F9F-8B Cougar – Apr 1957
- FJ-4B Fury – 19 Jul 1957
- A4D-2/A-4B Skyhawk – 20 Jun 1961
- A-4E Skyhawk – 02 Jan 1964
- A-4F Skyhawk – Oct 1967

== See also ==
- List of squadrons in the Dictionary of American Naval Aviation Squadrons
- Attack aircraft
- List of inactive United States Navy aircraft squadrons
- History of the United States Navy
