= VA-23 (U.S. Navy) =

Attack Squadron 23
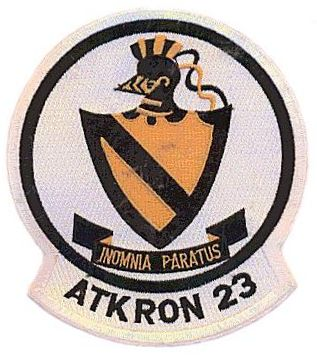
- VA-23 squadron patch
- Active: December 1949 – 1 April 1970
- Country: United States
- Branch: United States Navy
- Role: Attack aircraft
- Part of: Inactive
- Nickname(s): Black Knights
- Engagements: Korean War; Vietnam War

Aircraft flown
- Attack: F4U Corsair; F9F Panther; F7U Cutlass; FJ-4 Fury; A-4 Skyhawk

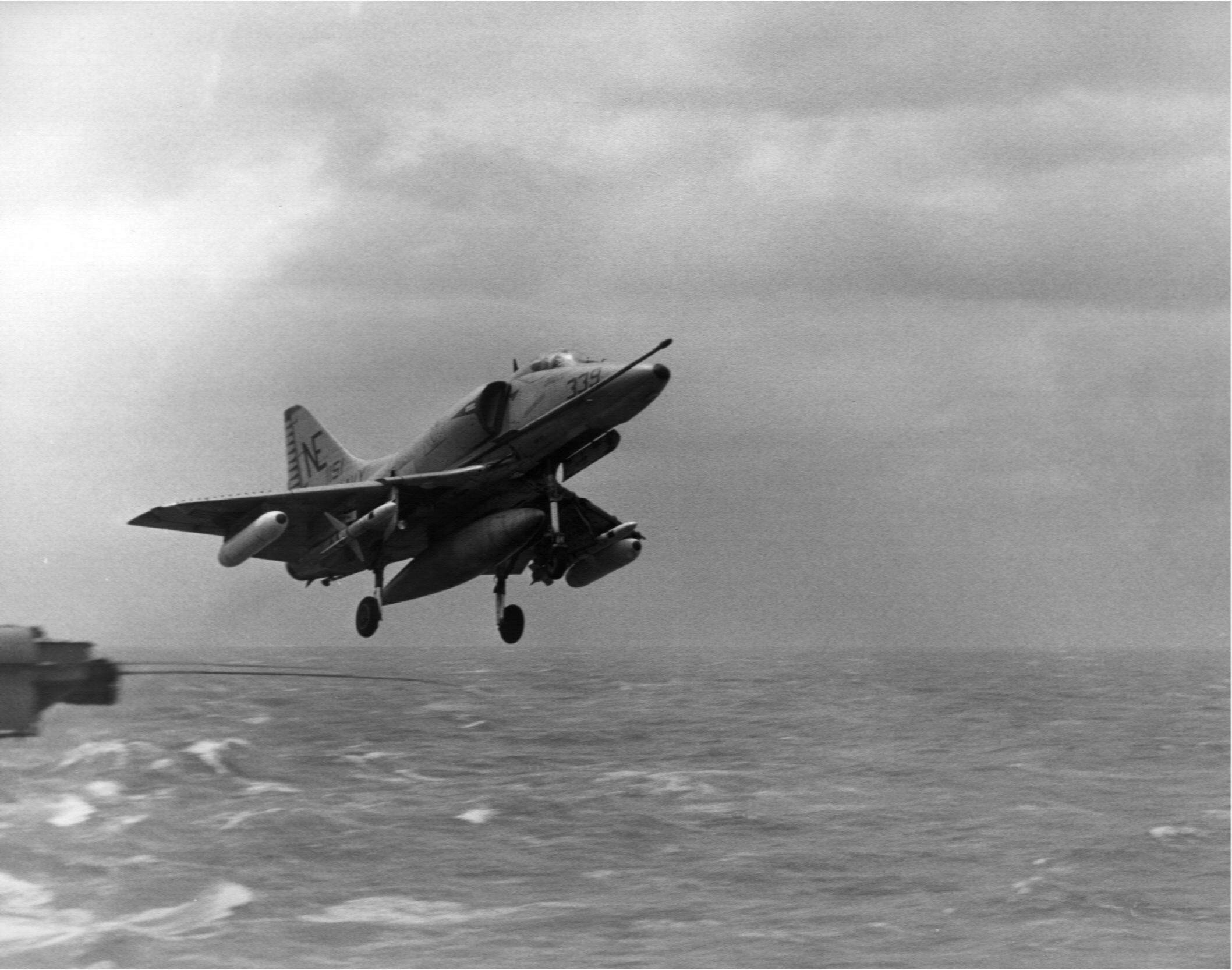
VA-23 A-4E is launched from USS Coral Sea for a mission in Vietnam. It is armed with AGM-45 Shrike missiles and LAU-3 rockets

VA-23, nicknamed the Black Knights, was an Attack Squadron of the United States Navy, established as Reserve Fighter Squadron VF-653 in December 1949 at NAS Akron, Ohio. The squadron relocated to NAS Alameda on 16 April 1951. It was redesignated VF-151 on 4 February 1953, and as VA-151 on 7 February 1956. It was finally designated as VA-23 on 23 February 1959, and moved to NAS Lemoore on 30 September 1961. The squadron was disestablished on 1 April 1970.

== Operational history ==
The squadron conducted its first combat strikes on 11 December 1951 during the Korean War.

In February 1955, it provided air support during the evacuation of Chinese Nationalists from the Tachen Islands during the First Taiwan Straits Crisis.

In April 1965, operating from USS Midway on Yankee Station, VA-23 conducted its first combat operations since the Korean War; it became the first squadron to use the Shrike missile in combat.

In March 1968, along with other squadrons in CVW-19, conducted flight operations from USS Ticonderoga in the Sea of Japan. These operations were part of a continuing show of American forces in the area, named Operation Formation Star, following the capture of USS Pueblo by North Korea on 23 January 1968.

In April 1968, VA-23 flew combat strikes around Khe Sanh, South Vietnam, in support of the besieged Marine base there.

== Aircraft assignment ==
The squadron was assigned the following aircraft in the months shown:

- FG-1D – 1951
- F4U-4 – 1951
- F4U-4B – 1951
- F9F-2 – August 1952
- F9F-5 – October 1952
- F7U-3M – May 1955
- F7U-3 – June 1955
- F9F-8B – December 1956
- F9F-8 – January 1957
- FJ-4B – July 1957
- A4D-2 – May 1960
- A-4E – December 1962
- A-4F – July 1967

== See also ==
- Attack aircraft
- History of the United States Navy
- List of inactive United States Navy aircraft squadrons
