= VA-144 (U.S. Navy) =

Attack Squadron 144
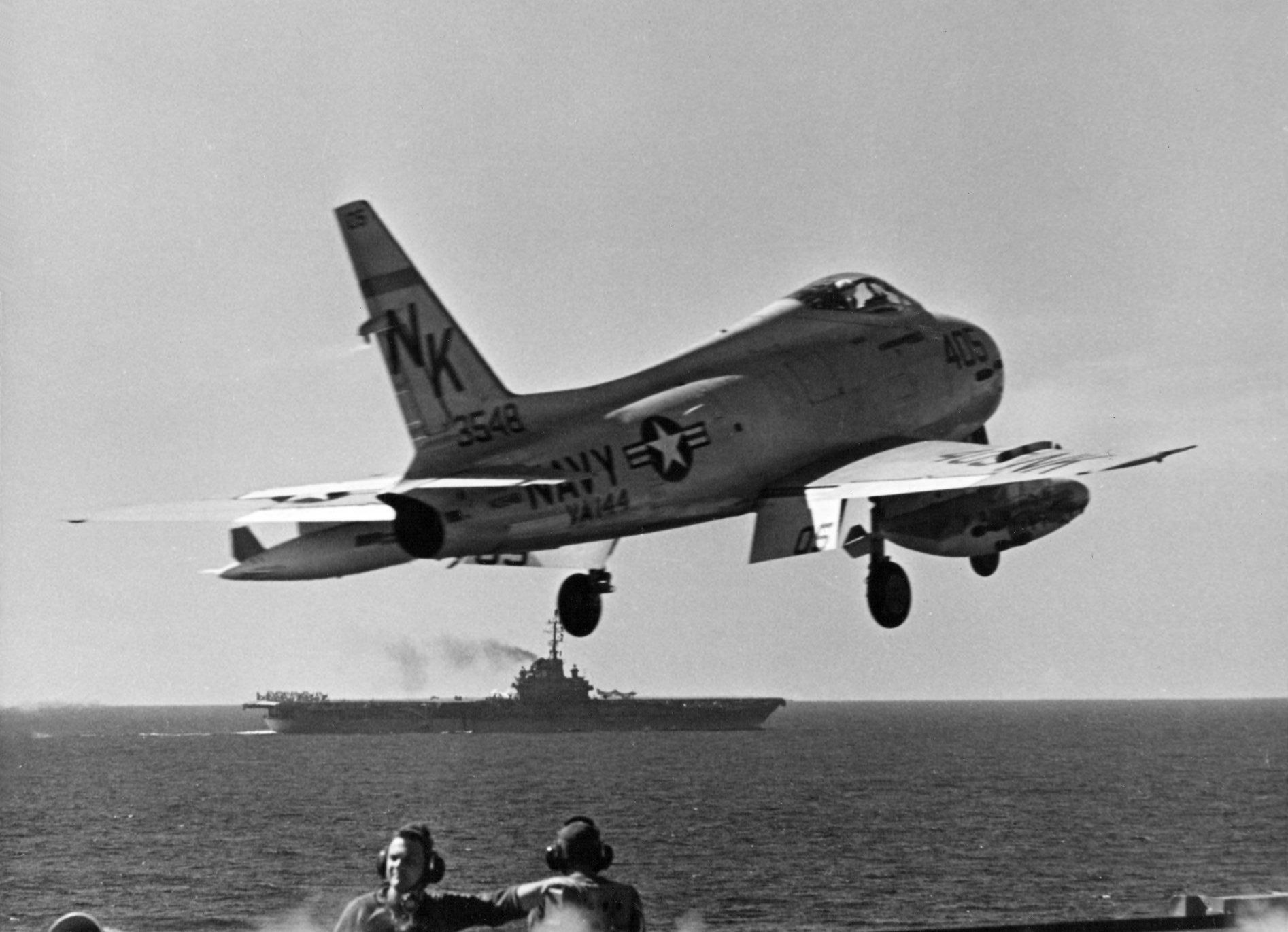
- VA-144 FJ-4B Fury taking off from USS Ranger off Japan, 1959
- Active: 1 December 1955 – 29 January 1971
- Country: United States
- Branch: United States Navy
- Role: Attack aircraft
- Part of: Inactive
- Nickname(s): Roadrunners
- Engagements: Vietnam War

Aircraft flown
- Attack: F7U Cutlass; FJ-4 Fury; A-4 Skyhawk

VA-144 was an Attack Squadron of the U.S. Navy, nicknamed the Roadrunners. It was established as VA-116 on 1 December 1955, and redesignated VA-144 on 23 February 1959. The squadron was disestablished on 29 January 1971.

== Operational history ==
- September 1957: The squadron, embarked on USS Hancock, was on station off the coast of Taiwan due to a build-up of Chinese Communist forces on the mainland opposite Taiwan.
- 26 May–18 August 1958: The squadron was embarked on USS Ranger during its transit from the east coast, via South America, to its new home port at Naval Air Station Alameda, California.
- July 1959: The squadron, embarked on Ranger, maintained station off the coast of Taiwan due to increased tension between Taiwan and Communist China.
- June–November 1964: The squadron participated in Yankee Team Operations. These operations involved support for photo reconnaissance missions over Laos. During these operations, the squadron was the first operational unit to fly with and drop the Snakeye weapon.
- 4 August 1964: The squadron flew night sorties in support of the American destroyers USS Turner Joy and USS Maddox, during the Gulf of Tonkin incident.
- 5 August 1964: VA-144 participated in Operation Pierce Arrow, air strikes against North Vietnamese torpedo boats, their bases and supporting facilities in retaliation for the attacks on the American destroyers the previous day. Strikes were flown against the North Vietnamese home port of Hon Gai and the naval craft located there. During this engagement Lieutenant (jg) Everett Alvarez, Jr.’s A-4C was hit by antiaircraft fire and he was forced to eject. A rescue attempt failed and he was captured. He became the first American naval prisoner-of-war during the Vietnam War and was held by the North Vietnamese until 1973.
- 20 December 1967: Commanders J. R. Powell, Jr. and R. C. Bos were awarded the Silver Star for planning and leading a successful strike against the heavily defended Haiphong Thermal Power Plant (west).
- 24 April 1967: VA-144's aircraft participated in a strike against the Kép Air Base, the first time the airfield was hit during the air war over North Vietnam.

== Home port assignments ==
The squadron was assigned to these home ports, effective on the dates shown:

- NAS Miramar – 01 Dec 1955
- NAS Lemoore – May 1962

== Aircraft assignment ==
The squadron first received the following aircraft on the dates shown:

- F7U-3M Cutlass – Dec 1955
- FJ-4B Fury – 15 Oct 1957
- A-4C Skyhawk – 04 Jun 1962
- A-4E Skyhawk – Jul 1967
- A-4F Skyhawk – 12 Nov 1969

== See also ==
- List of squadrons in the Dictionary of American Naval Aviation Squadrons
- Attack aircraft
- List of inactive United States Navy aircraft squadrons
- History of the United States Navy
