= Second VA-66 (U.S. Navy) =

Attack Squadron 66
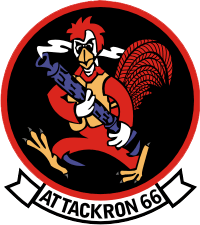
- VA-66 squadron insignia
- Active: 1 February 1951 – 31 March 1987
- Country: United States
- Branch: United States Navy
- Role: Attack
- Part of: Inactive
- Nickname(s): Waldomen/Waldos

Aircraft flown
- Attack: F4U-4 Corsair; F8F-2 Bearcat; F9F-5 Panther; F7U-3 Cutlass; F9F-8B Cougar; A4D-1 Skyhawk; A-7E Corsair

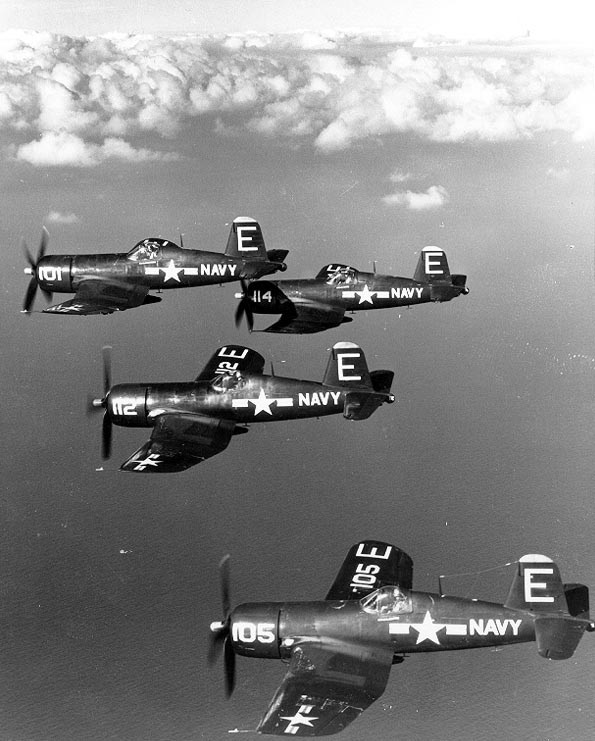
VF-671 F4U-4s in 1951

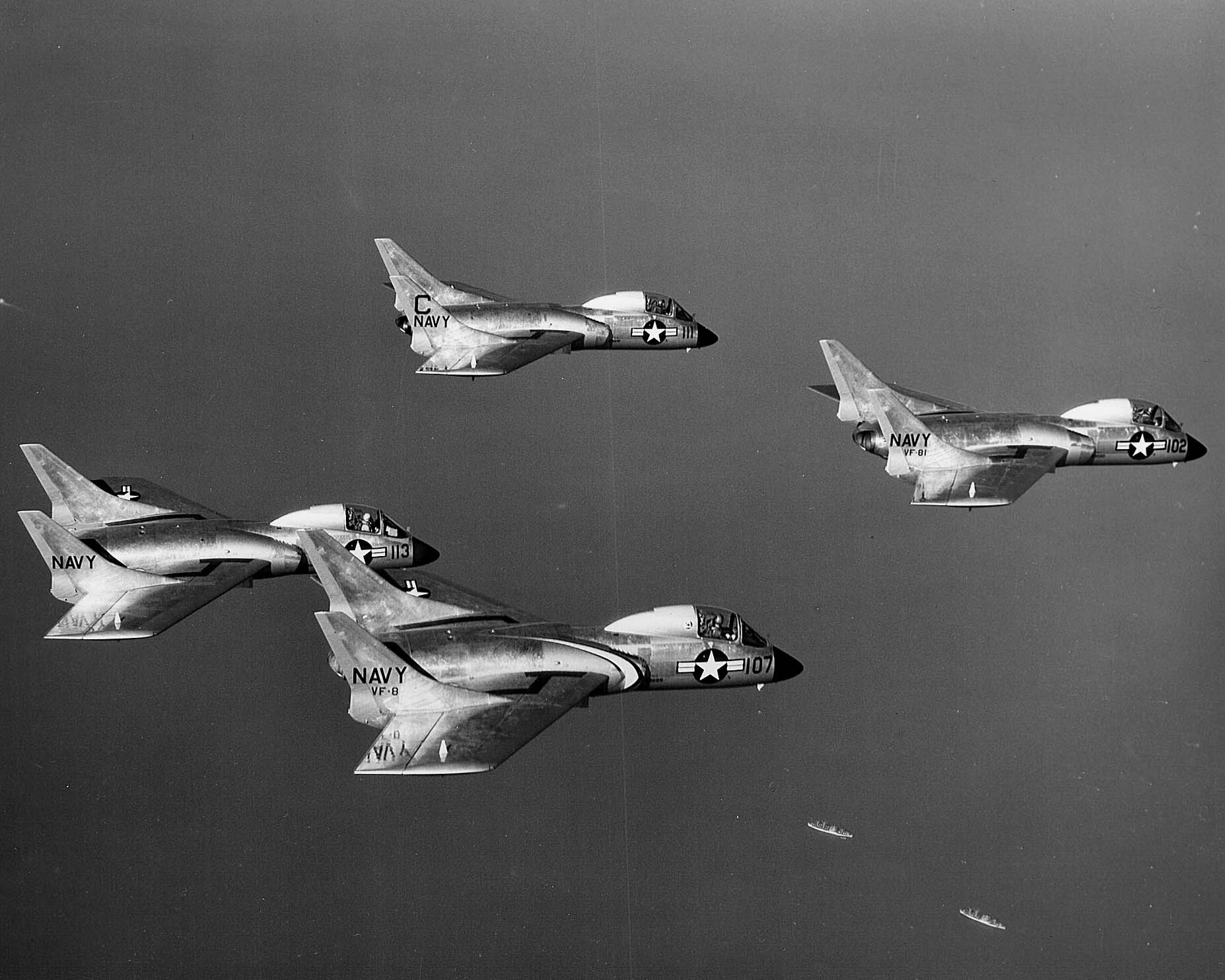
VF-81 F7U-3s in 1954

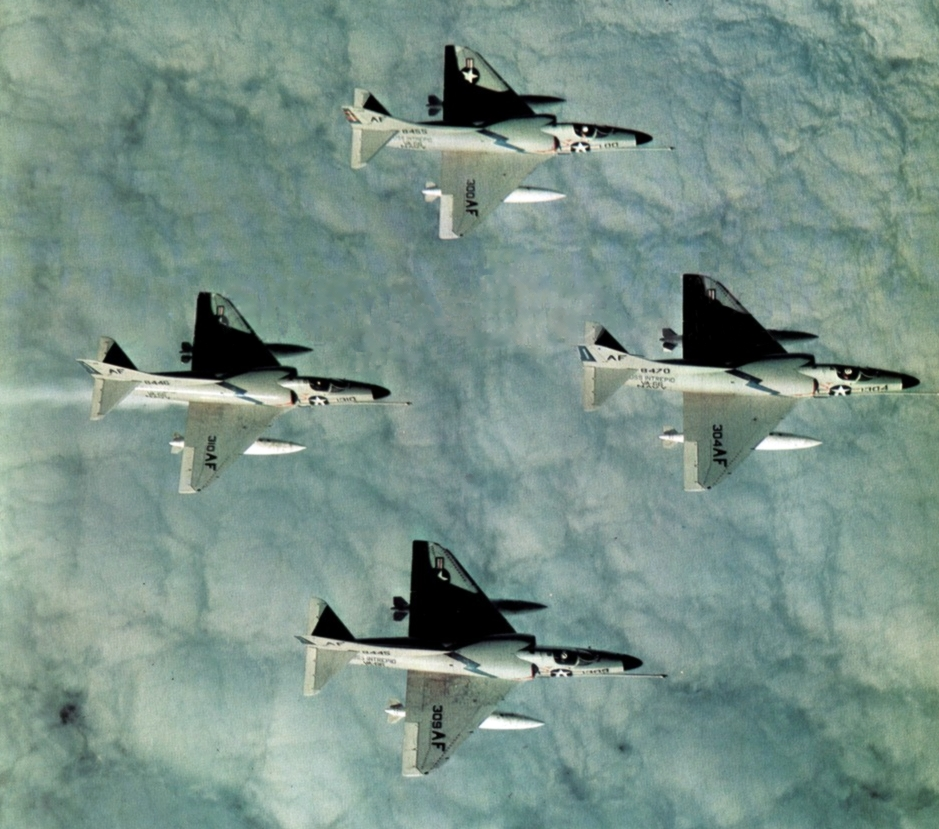
VA-66 A-4Cs in 1961

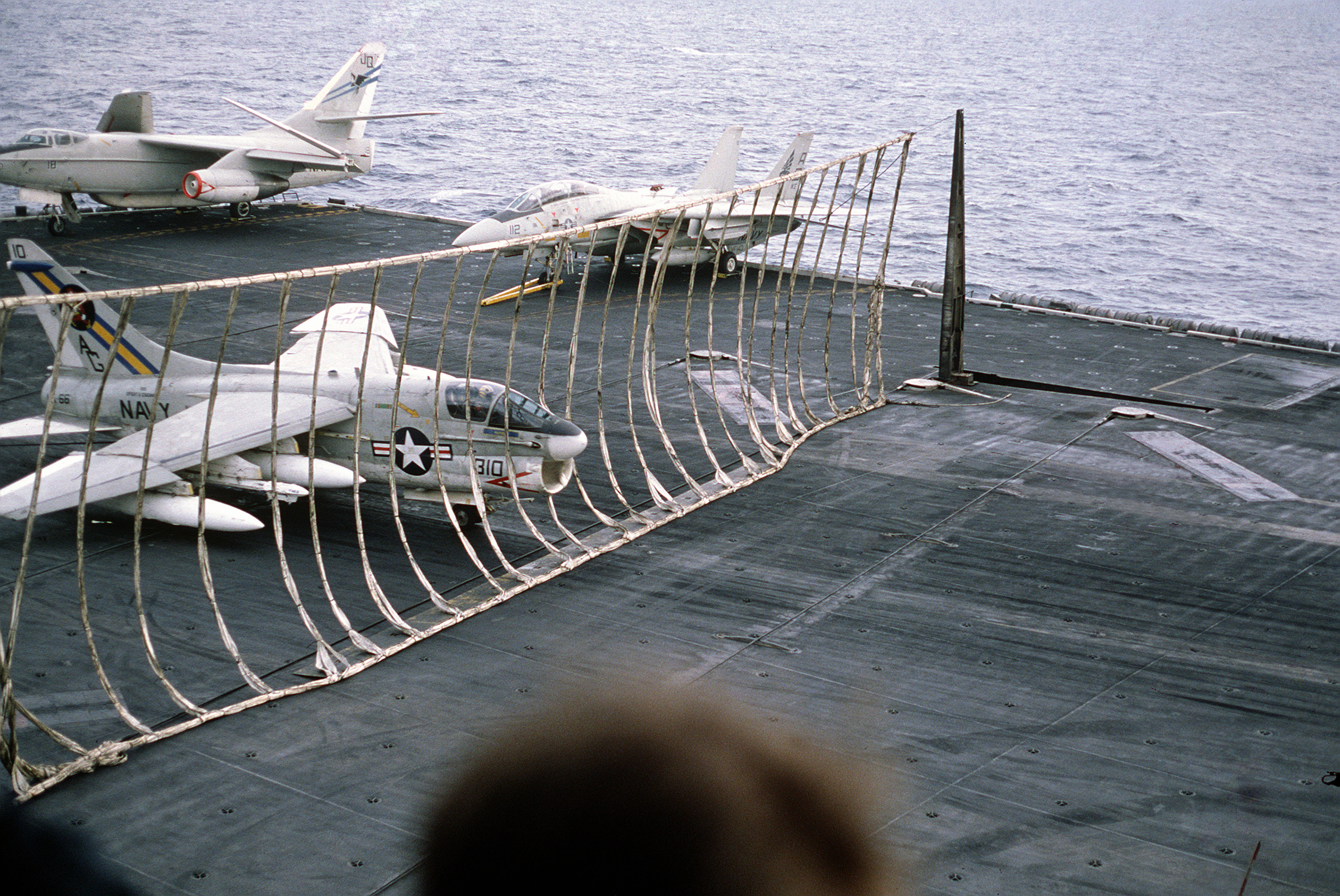
VA-66 A-7E making a barrier landing on USS Dwight D. Eisenhower in 1983.

VA-66 was an Attack Squadron of the U.S. Navy; it was the second squadron to be so named. The squadron was called to duty and established as Reserve Fighter Squadron VF-671 on 1 February 1951. It was redesignated Fighter Squadron VF-81 on 4 February 1953, and finally as VA-66 on 1 July 1955. The squadron was disestablished on 1 October 1986, but one detachment continued in existence until 31 March 1987. The squadron's nickname was the Waldomen from the 1950s to the early 1960s, and the Waldos from that point forward. Its insignia, a rooster toting a machine gun, was a well-known design in naval aviation.

== Operational history ==
- January–February 1953: VF-81, with its F9F-5s, participated in operational tests aboard the Navy’s first angled deck carrier, USS Antietam.
- April 1954: VF-81 became the first operational fleet squadron to receive and operate the F7U Cutlass.
- 27 May 1959: During the squadron’s deployment to the Mediterranean Sea, the commanding officer, Commander McNeil, was killed in an aircraft accident during a practice Carrier Controlled Approach.
- 14 August 1962: The squadron participated in cross deck operations aboard the British carrier HMS Hermes.
- October–December 1962: While embarked on USS Enterprise, the squadron participated in the Cuban blockade.
- 31 July–3 October 1964: Enterprise, with VA-66 embarked, participated in Operation Sea Orbit, the first circumnavigation of the world by a nuclear task force. The sixty-five-day voyage was accomplished without replenishment. The squadron participated in numerous airpower demonstrations during the voyage.
- 8 June 1967: VA-66’s aircraft were part of an Air Wing 6 strike group that was launched to defend USS Liberty when she came under attack by the Israelis during the 1967 Six-Day War. When word was received that the attack had been a mistake on the part of the Israelis, the aircraft were recalled.
- June 1970: VA-66, embarked on USS Forrestal, operated in the Eastern Mediterranean after Americans were taken hostage by the Popular Front for the Liberation of Palestine in Amman, Jordan.
- October–November 1973: Embarked on USS Independence, the squadron operated south of Crete during the Yom Kippur War.
- August 1974: USS Independence relieved USS America off Cyprus following the 1974 Cypriot coup d'état. During the crisis the American Ambassador was killed and anti-American demonstrations took place which led to the evacuation of U.S. citizens to American vessels.
- 15 April 1980: USS Dwight D. Eisenhower deployed to the Indian Ocean as part of the continuing response to the Iran hostage crisis.
- 22 December 1980: The squadron returned from its deployment to the Indian Ocean after spending a total of 246 days at sea. With only one port visit, the longest at sea period was for 153 days.
- June 1982: After the Israeli invasion of Lebanon on 6 June, VA-66 operated in the Eastern Mediterranean. During the latter part of June the American carrier forces in the Mediterranean included Eisenhower, Independence, Forrestal, and USS John F. Kennedy.
- 24 June 1982: VA-66 provided air support during the evacuation of Americans from Beirut, Lebanon, prior to the siege of Beirut by the Israelis.
- 25 October 1983: Due to the 1983 Beirut barracks bombing, Eisenhower terminated its visit to Naples and departed for the eastern Mediterranean. The squadron operated in the vicinity of Lebanon until the latter part of November.
- 7 March 1985: Eisenhower cut short a visit to Palma, Spain, and made a high speed transit to the Eastern Mediterranean due to the increased tension in Lebanon.
- 1 October 1986: VA-66 was officially disestablished but continued to operate as a detachment. The detachment continued to operate because its primary mission during the deployment was to provide HARM missile support for the air wing and carrier.
- 30 January 1987: Kennedy cancelled its port visit to Málaga, Spain, and made a high speed transit to the eastern Mediterranean due to the increased tension over the Lebanon hostage crisis.
- 31 March 1987: VA-66 Detachment was disestablished.

== Home port assignments ==
The squadron was assigned to these home ports, effective on the dates shown:

- NAS Atlanta – 1 February 1951
- NAS Jacksonville – 5 April 1951
- NAS Quonset Point – 28 September 1951
- NAS Oceana – 11 June 1952
- NAS Cecil Field – 15 March 1965

== Aircraft assignment ==
The squadron first received the following aircraft on the dates shown:

- F4U-4 Corsair – February 1951
- F8F-2 Bearcat – 13 June 1952
- F9F-5 Panther – 5 December 1952
- F7U-3 Cutlass – April 1954
- F9F-8B Cougar – August 1956
- A4D-1 Skyhawk – March 1958
- A4D-2 Skyhawk – June 1958
- A4D-2N/A4-C Skyhawk – March 1961
- A-7E Corsair II – October 1970

== See also ==
- Attack aircraft
- List of inactive United States Navy aircraft squadrons
- History of the United States Navy
