= Wings of Freedom Aviation Museum =

Harold F. Pitcairn Wings of Freedom Aviation Museum

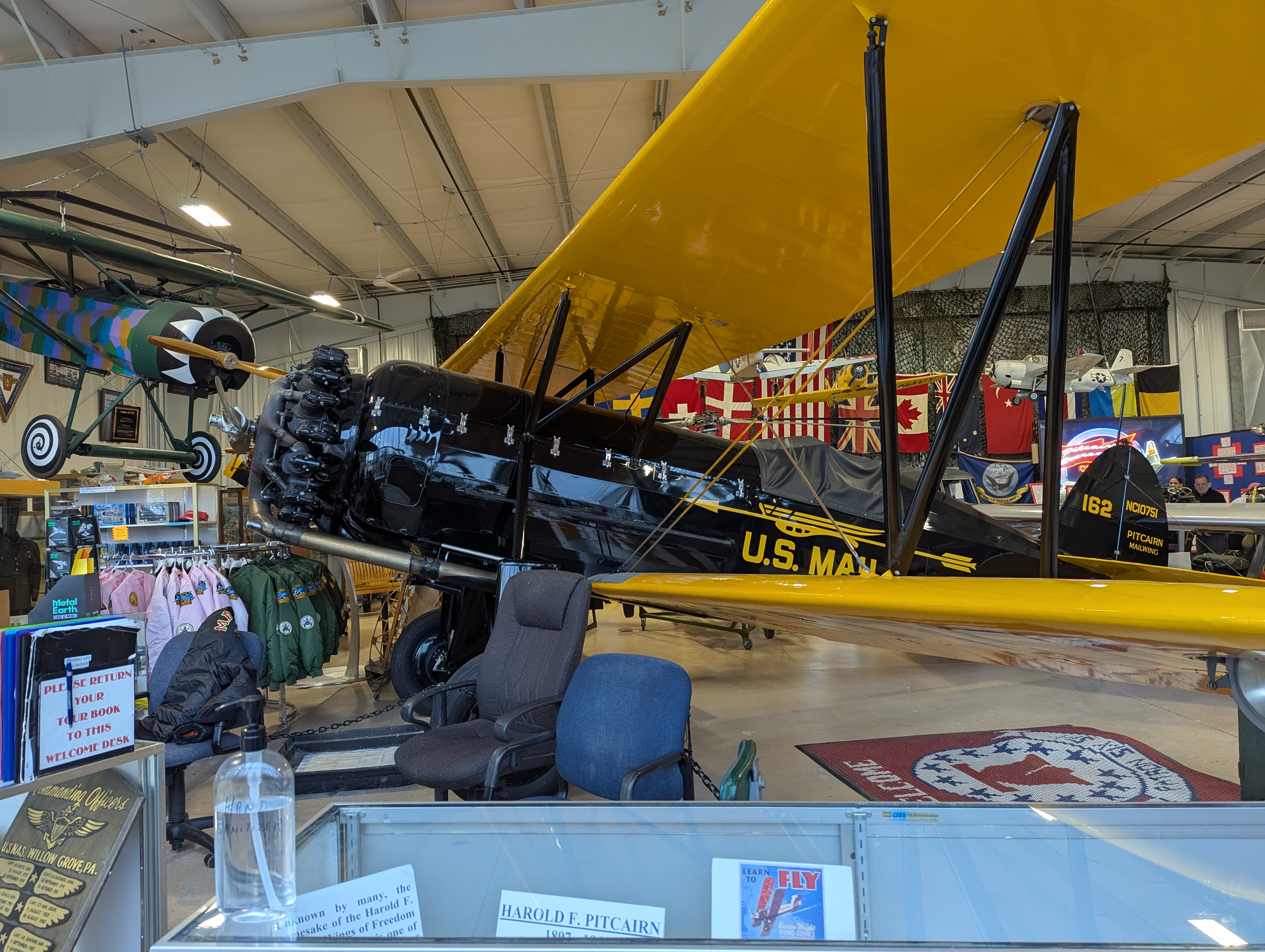
- A Pitcairn PA-8 Mailwing inside the museum

- Location within Pennsylvania
- Established: 2004
- Location: 1155 Easton Rd; Horsham, Pennsylvania; United States
- Coordinates: 40.201961°N 75.139875°W
- Type: Aviation museum
- Founder: Lieutenant Commander David Ascher
- Chairperson: Major General Ronald K. Nelson
- Website: http://wingsoffreedommuseum.org

The Harold F. Pitcairn Wings of Freedom Aviation Museum in Horsham, Pennsylvania is a museum dedicated to preserving the aviation history of the Philadelphia metropolitan area including NAS Willow Grove and its namesake, Harold F. Pitcairn. It is owned and operated by the Delaware Valley Historical Aircraft Association (DVHAA), a non-profit organization. Opened in 2004, the museum features restored historic aircraft, flight helmets, flight gear, air to air missiles, Martin-Baker ejection seats, and military service medals.

== History ==
The museum traces its history back to the work of Lieutenant Commander David Ascher. Shortly after becoming the aircraft maintenance officer in May 1946, Ascher acquired a Curtiss TP-40N Warhawk from a local high school and displayed it at NAS Willow Grove. Later, through his efforts, an Arado Ar 196 was also added for display. Finally, in 1947, several captured Axis aircraft were recovered from Patuxent River and transported to the base for display.

Although most of the aircraft were later transferred to the National Air and Space Museum, Naval Aviation Museum, and other institutions, the Delaware Valley Historical Aircraft Association was able to found a new museum. Construction on the new building began in May 2002 and the museum opened to the public in 2004.

The museum began planning for an expansion in 2011, but it was delayed by the discovery of hazardous chemicals left over from the area's time as a military base.

The museum unveiled an H-34 painted as Marine One in October 2025. At the same time, it stated that it anticipated receiving an additional 13.1 acres (0.053 km^{2}) from the former navy base that would allow the museum to expand.

== Aircraft on display ==
Aircraft are on display both inside the museum and outside on the ground, and include:

- Beechcraft T-34B Mentor
- Bell H-13G Sioux
- Bell UH-1V Iroquois
- Convair F2Y Sea Dart
- Douglas A-4M Skyhawk
- Fairchild Republic A-10 Thunderbolt II
- Fokker D.VIII
- Grumman C-1A Trader
- Grumman F9F-2 Panther
- Gyrodyne QH-50C DASH
- Kaman SH-2G Super Seasprite
- Lockheed P-3B Orion
- Lockheed TV-1 Shooting Star
- McDonnell Douglas F-4 Phantom II
- McDonnell Douglas F/A-18A Hornet
- North American FJ-4B Fury
- Piasecki HUP-2 Retriever
- Pitcairn PA-8 Mailwing
- Republic F-84F Thunderstreak
- Sikorsky UH-34J Seabat
- Vought F7U-3 Cutlass
- Vought F8U-1 Crusader
