= VF-124 (1950–1958) =

Fighter Squadron 124
- Active: 20 July 1950 – 10 April 1958
- Country: United States
- Branch: United States Navy
- Role: Fighter aircraft
- Part of: Inactive
- Nickname(s): Stingarees
- Engagements: Korean War

Aircraft flown
- Fighter: F4U-4 Corsair; F7U-3 Cutlass

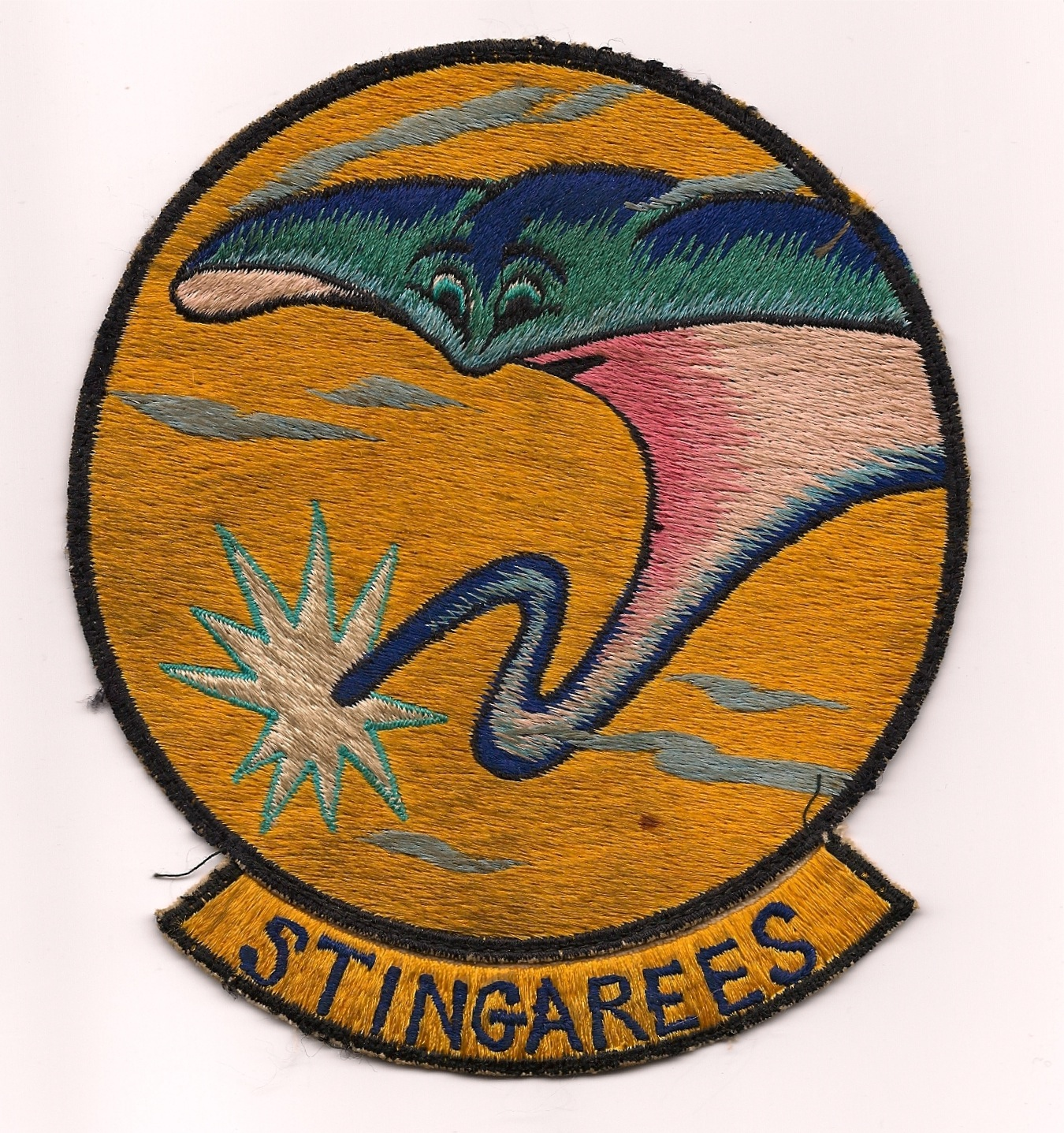
VF-124 Stingarees squadron patch as worn on G-1 leather flight jackets during the Far Eastern cruise aboard USS Hancock CVA-19, 1955–56.

Fighter Squadron 124 or VF-124 was an aviation unit of the United States Navy. Originally established as Reserve Squadron VF-874 it was called to active duty on 20 July 1950, redesignated VF-124 on 4 February 1953, it was disestablished on 10 April 1958.

== Operational history ==
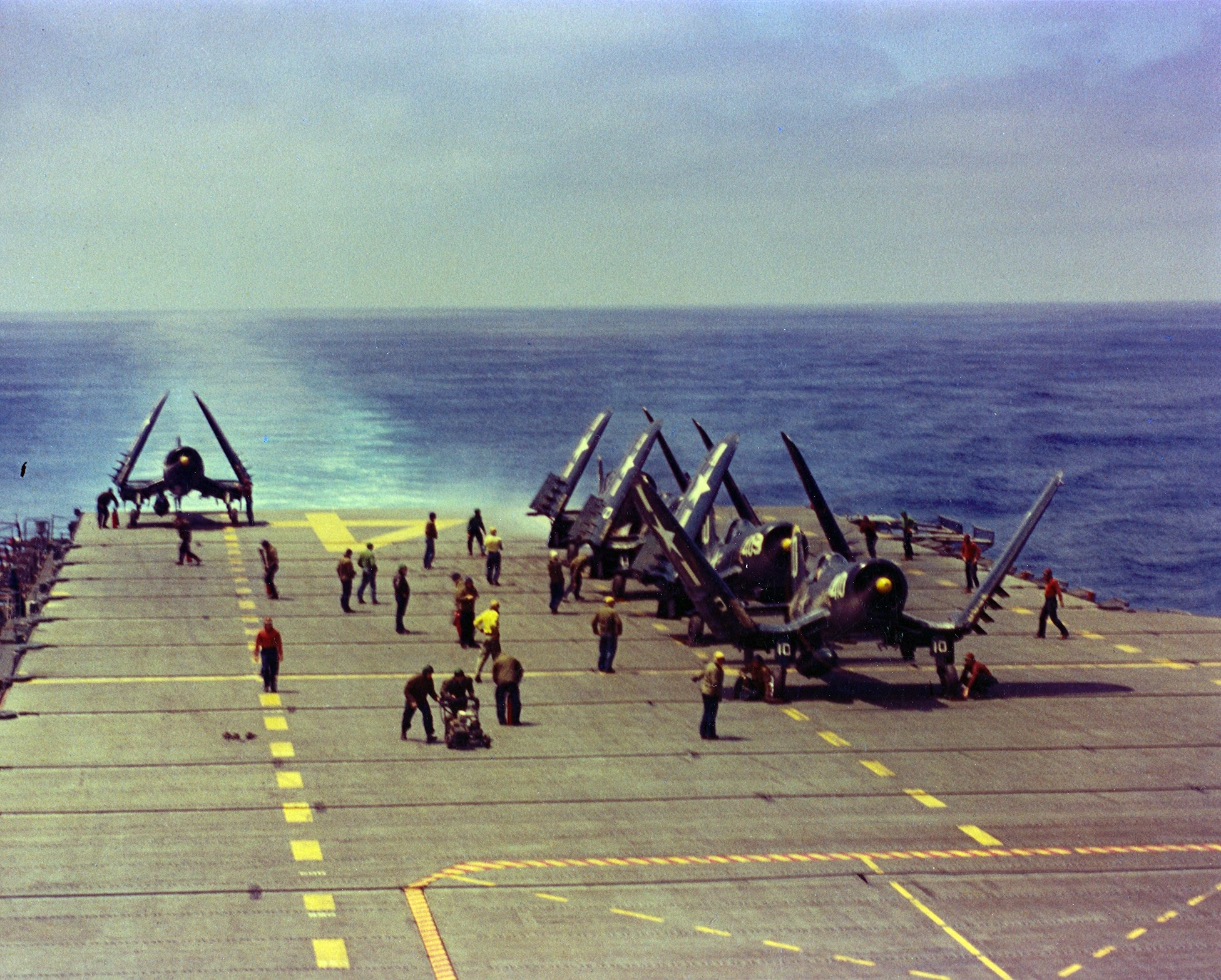
VF-874 F4U-4s on USS Oriskany in 1952

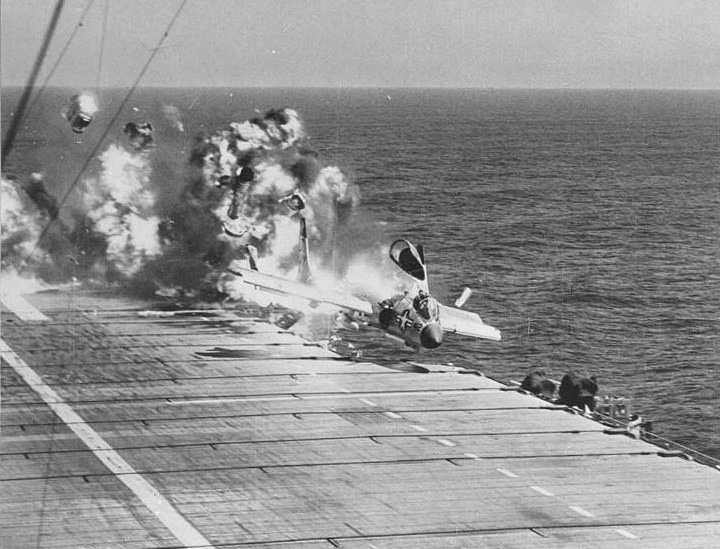
VF-124 F7U-3 ramp strike on USS Hancock in July 1955

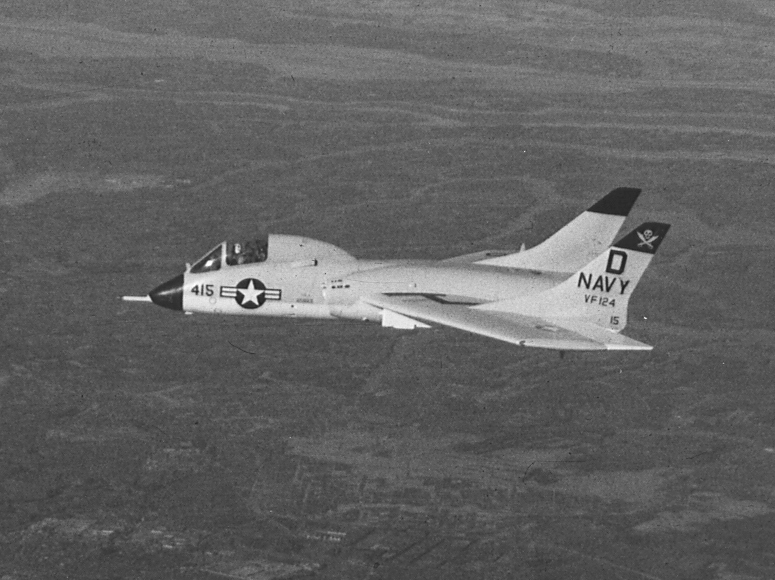
VF-124 F7U-3 c.1955

VF-874 equipped with F4U-4 Corsairs was deployed on USS Bon Homme Richard in Korean waters from 29 May to 20 November 1951. During this deployment VF-874 lost 11 aircraft and 2 pilots.

VF-874 deployed on USS Oriskany to Korean waters from 31 October 1952 – 22 April 1953, two aircraft were lost during this deployment.

VF-124 was assigned to Carrier Air Group 12 (CVG-12) aboard USS Hancock during the Far Eastern cruise from 10 August 1955 to 15 March 1956.

== Aircraft assignment ==
- F4U-4 Corsair
- F9F Panther
- F7U-3 Cutlass

== See also ==
- History of the United States Navy
- List of inactive United States Navy aircraft squadrons
- List of United States Navy aircraft squadrons
