= VF-122 =

Fighter Squadron 122
- Active: 2 August 1950 – 10 April 1958
- Country: United States
- Branch: United States Navy
- Role: Fighter aircraft
- Part of: Inactive
- Nickname(s): Black Angels
- Engagements: Korean War

Aircraft flown
- Fighter: F4U-4 Corsair; F9F-5 Panther; F9F-8 Cougar; F3H-2N Demon

Fighter Squadron 122 or VF-122 was an aviation unit of the United States Navy. Originally established as Reserve Squadron 783 (VF-783) it was called to active duty on 2 August 1950, it was re-designated VF-122 on 4 February 1953 and disestablished on 10 April 1958.

== Operational history ==
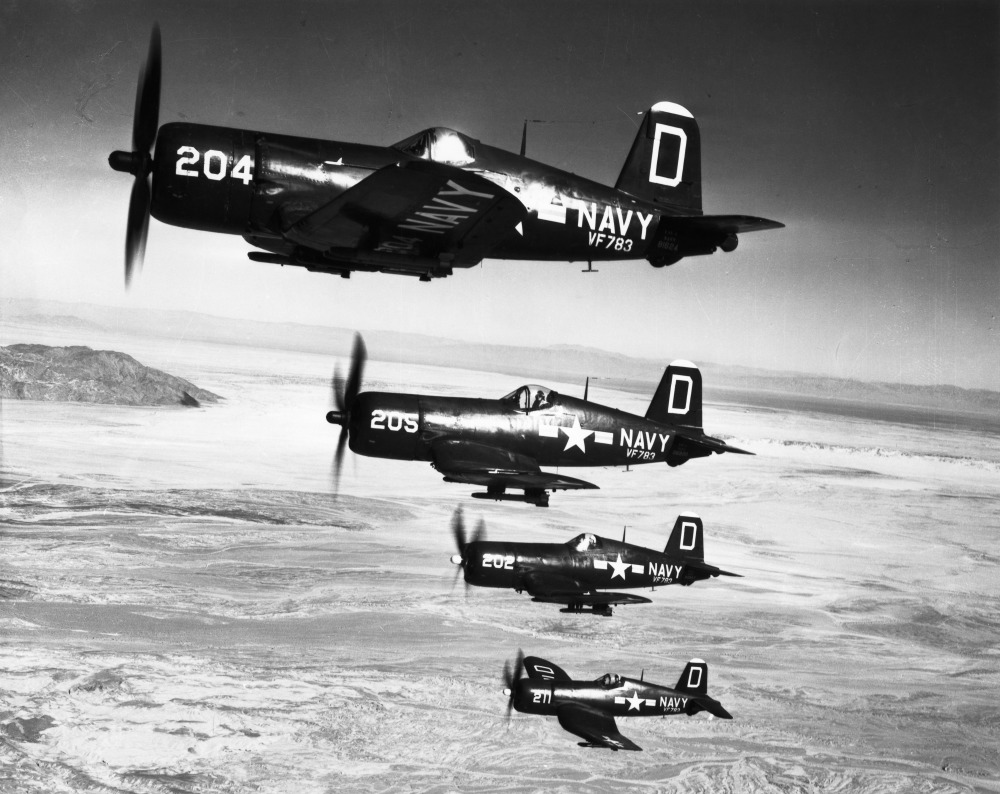
VF-783 F4U-4s in 1950

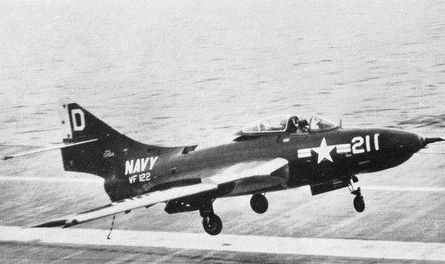
VF-122 F9F-8 lands on USS Shangri-La in 1956

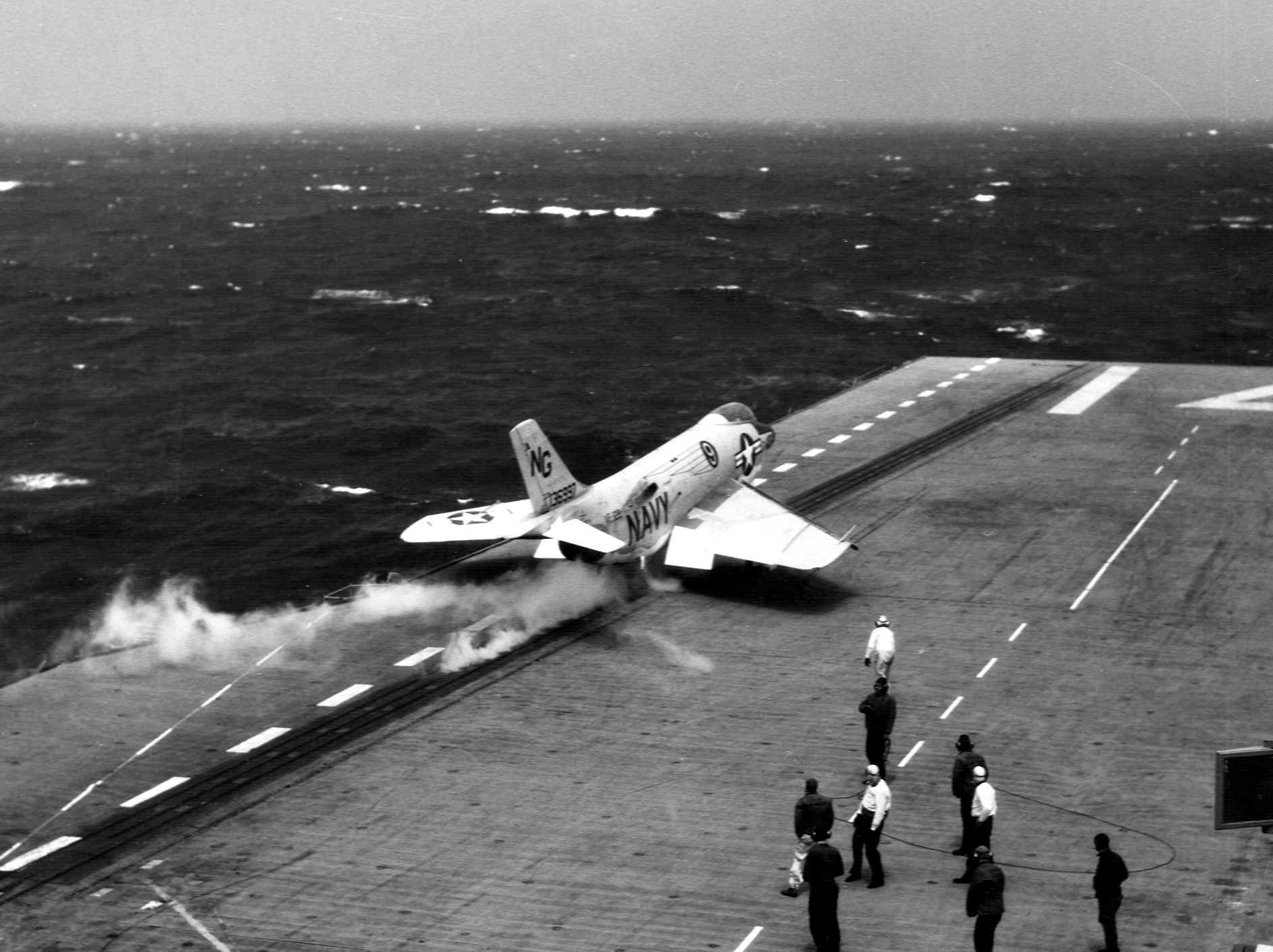
VF-122 F3H-2N launches from USS Ticonderoga in 1957

VF-783 was assigned to Carrier Air Group 102 (CVG-102) aboard the USS Bon Homme Richard for a deployment to Korea from 10 May to 17 December 1951. During this deployment VF-783 lost 8 F4U-4s and 3 pilots killed.

VF-783/VF-122 was assigned to Carrier Air Group Twelve (CVG-12) aboard USS Oriskany, which was deployed to Korea from 15 September 1952 to 18 May 1953. It lost 4 F9F-5s and 2 pilots killed.On 13 April 1953, the engine of an F9F Panther from the squadron flamed out during a photo reconnaissance mission and the pilot Lt(jg) Roy Tailor was killed when he attempted to ditch the plane at sea. On 20 April 1953, pilot Randolph T. Scoggan was killed when his F9F Panther was shot down by antiaircraft fire and crashed into the sea.

VF-122 was embarked on USS Boxer for a Western Pacific deployment from 3 March to 11 October 1954.

VF-122 was assigned to Air Task Group 3 (ATG-3) aboard USS Shangri-La for a Western Pacific deployment from 5 January to 23 June 1956.

== Aircraft assignment ==
- F4U-4 Corsair
- F9F-5 Panther
- F9F-8 Cougar
- F3H-2N Demon

== See also ==
- History of the United States Navy
- List of inactive United States Navy aircraft squadrons
- List of United States Navy aircraft squadrons
