= North American FJ-4 Fury =

Variant of the F-86 Sabre built for the US Navy and US Marine Corps

FJ-4 Fury
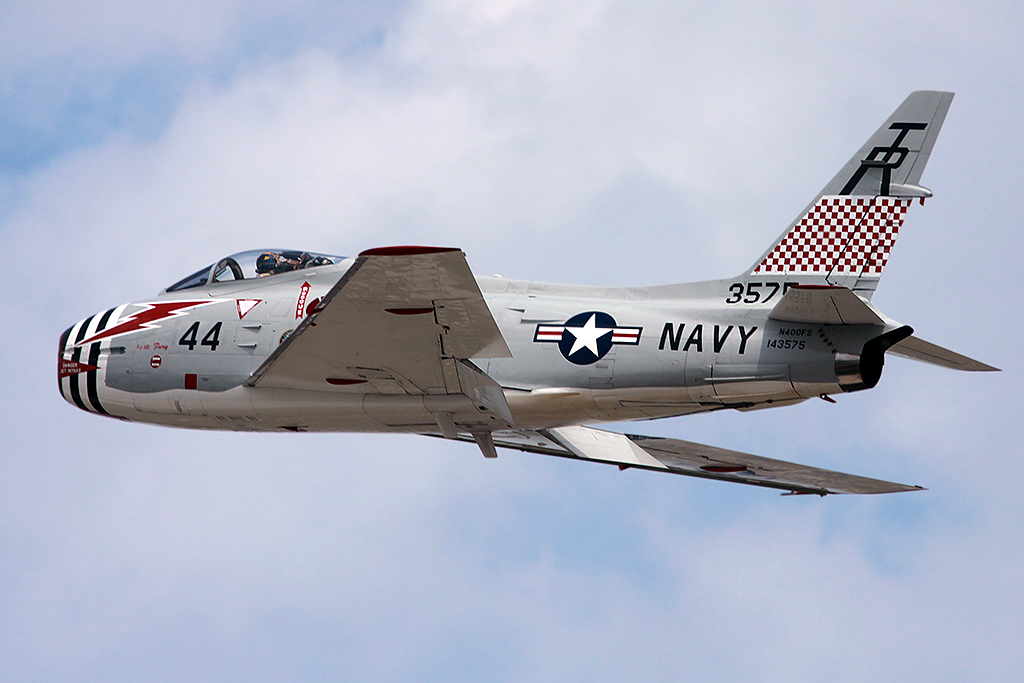
- The last flying FJ-4 in United States Navy colors

General information
- Type: Fighter aircraft
- National origin: United States
- Manufacturer: North American Aviation
- Primary users: United States Navy United States Marine Corps
- Number built: 374

History
- First flight: 28 October 1954
- Retired: December 1964
- Developed from: North American FJ-2/-3 Fury

The North American FJ-4 Fury is a swept-wing carrier-capable fighter-bomber for the United States Navy and Marine Corps. The final development in a lineage that included the Air Force's F-86 Sabre, the FJ-4 shared its general layout and engine with the earlier FJ-3, but featured an entirely new wing design and was a vastly different design in its final embodiment.

== Design and development ==
Compared to that of the FJ-3, the FJ-4's new wing was much thinner, with a six percent thickness-to-chord ratio, and featured skin panels milled from solid alloy plates. It also had an increased area, and tapered more sharply towards the tips. Slight camber behind the leading edge improved low speed characteristics. The main landing gear design had to be considerably modified to fold wheel and strut within the contours of the new wing. The track of the main wheels was increased and because they were closer to the center of gravity, there was less weight on the nosewheel. Wing folding was limited to the outer wing panels.

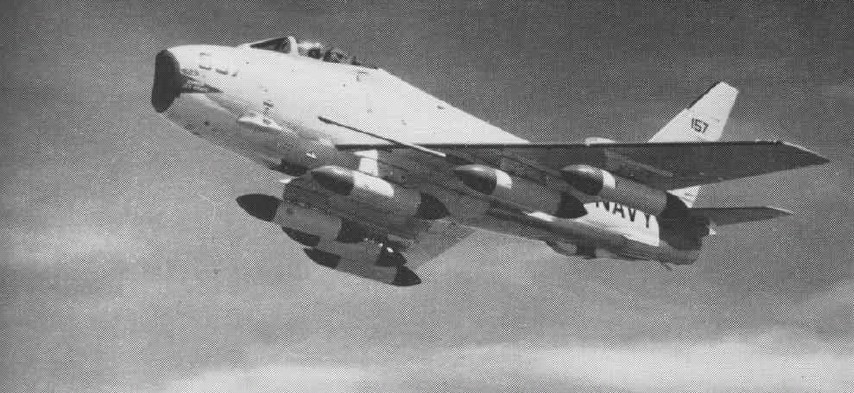
An FJ-4B with six rocket pods

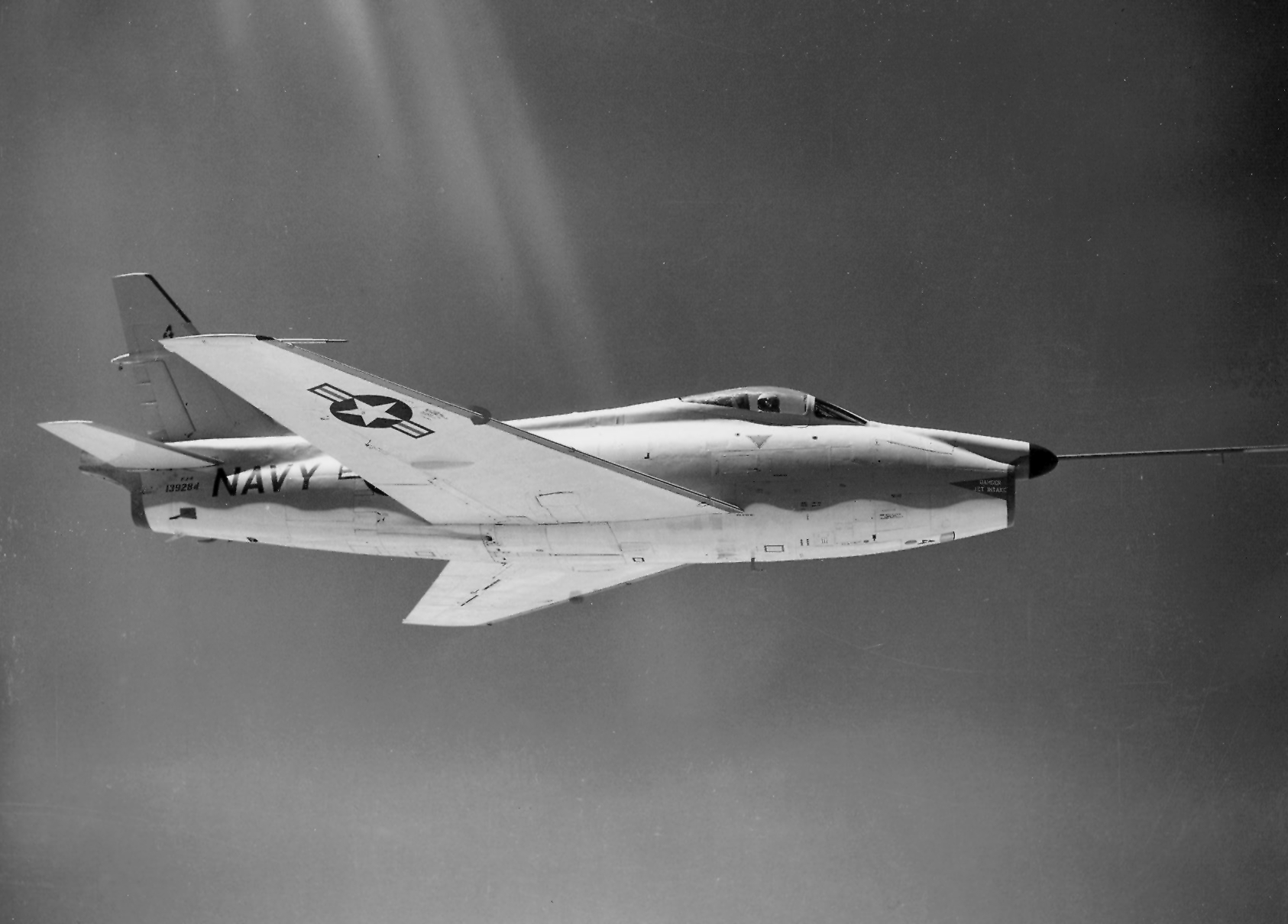
FJ-4F prototype with added rocket engine

The FJ-4 was intended as an all-weather interceptor, a role that required considerable range on internal fuel. The FJ-4 had 50% more fuel capacity than the FJ-3 and was lightened by omitting armor and reducing ammunition capacity. The new wing was "wet"; that is, it provided for integral fuel tankage. The fuselage was deepened to add more fuel, and had a distinctive "razorback" rear deck. A modified cockpit made the pilot more comfortable during the longer missions. The tail surfaces were also extensively modified and had a thinner profile. The overall changes resulted in an aircraft that had little in common with the earlier models, although a family resemblance was still present. The two prototypes had the same Wright J65-W-4 engine as the FJ-3, but production aircraft had the J65-W-16A of 7,700 lbf (34 kN) thrust.

The first FJ-4 flew on 28 October 1954 and delivery began in February 1955.

Of the original order for 221, the last 71 were modified in the FJ-4B ground-attack version. This had a stronger wing with six instead of four underwing stations and stronger landing gear. Additional aerodynamic brakes under the aft fuselage made landing safer by allowing pilots to use higher thrust settings, and were also useful for dive attacks. External load was doubled. The most important characteristic of the FJ-4B, however, was that it was capable of carrying a nuclear weapon on the inboard port station. It was equipped with the LABS or Low-Altitude Bombing System for the delivery of nuclear weapons. The Navy was eager to maintain a nuclear role in its rivalry with the Air Force, and it equipped 10 squadrons with the FJ-4B. It was also flown by three Marine squadrons. In April 1956 the Navy ordered 151 more FJ-4Bs, for a total of 152 FJ-4s and 222 FJ-4Bs produced, and 1,115 FJ aircraft of all variants delivered to the Navy and Marine Corps.

The Navy ordered six FJ-4s to be converted to FJ-4F to test rocket engines, but only two were completed. These featured the North American Rocketdyne AR-1 engine, installed in a fairing above the tail pipe of the jet engine. It ran on hydrogen peroxide and JP-4 jet fuel, and provided an additional 5,000 lbf (22 kN) of thrust for short periods. The FJ-4F reached speeds of Mach 1.41 and altitude of 71,000 ft (21,600 m).

=== Redesignation ===
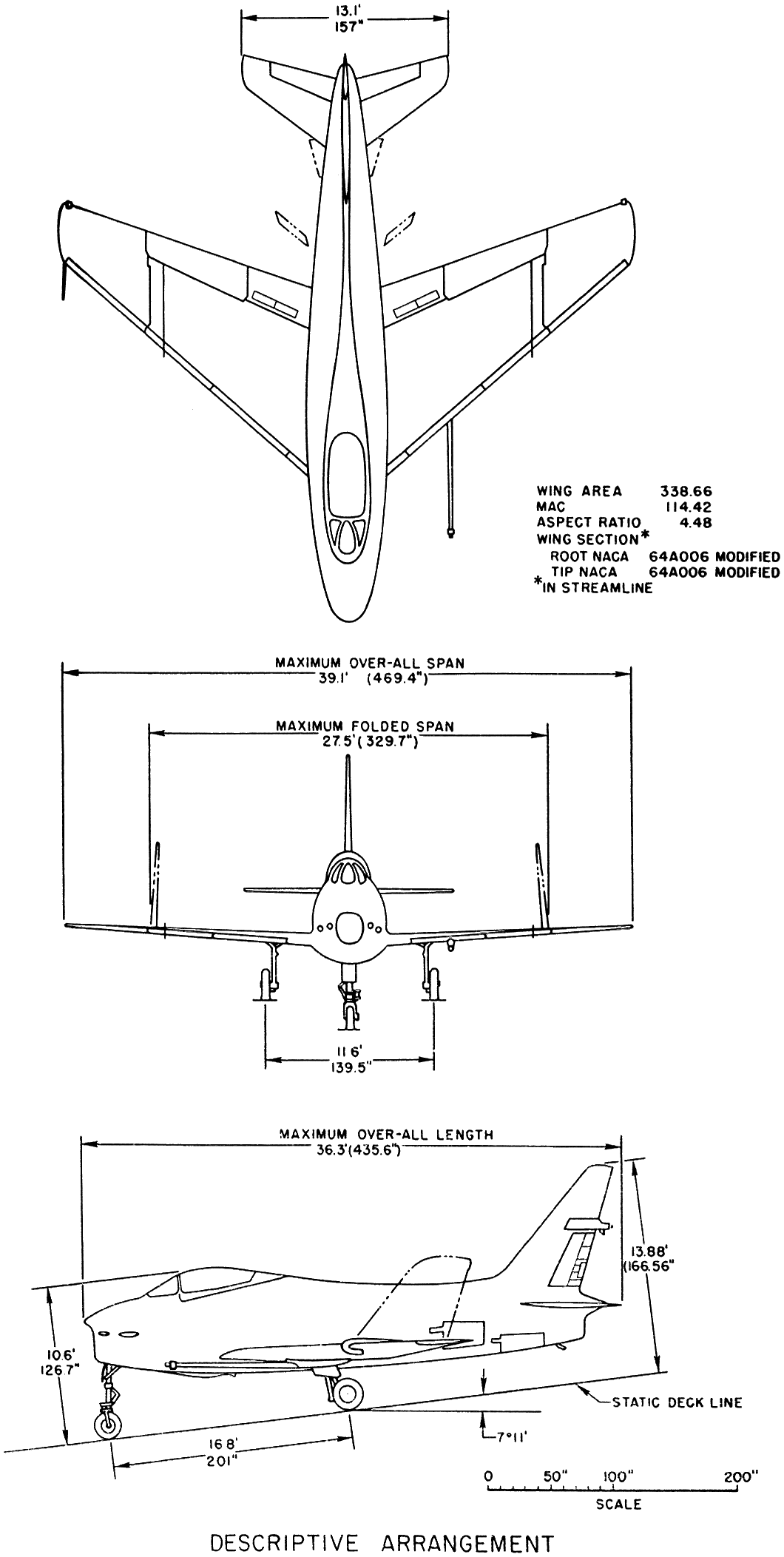
3-view line drawing of the North American FJ-4B Fury

With the 1962 adoption of the Tri-Service aircraft designation system, the FJ-4 became the F-1E and the FJ-4B the AF-1E. AF-1Es served with United States Naval Reserve units until the late 1960s.

== Variants ==
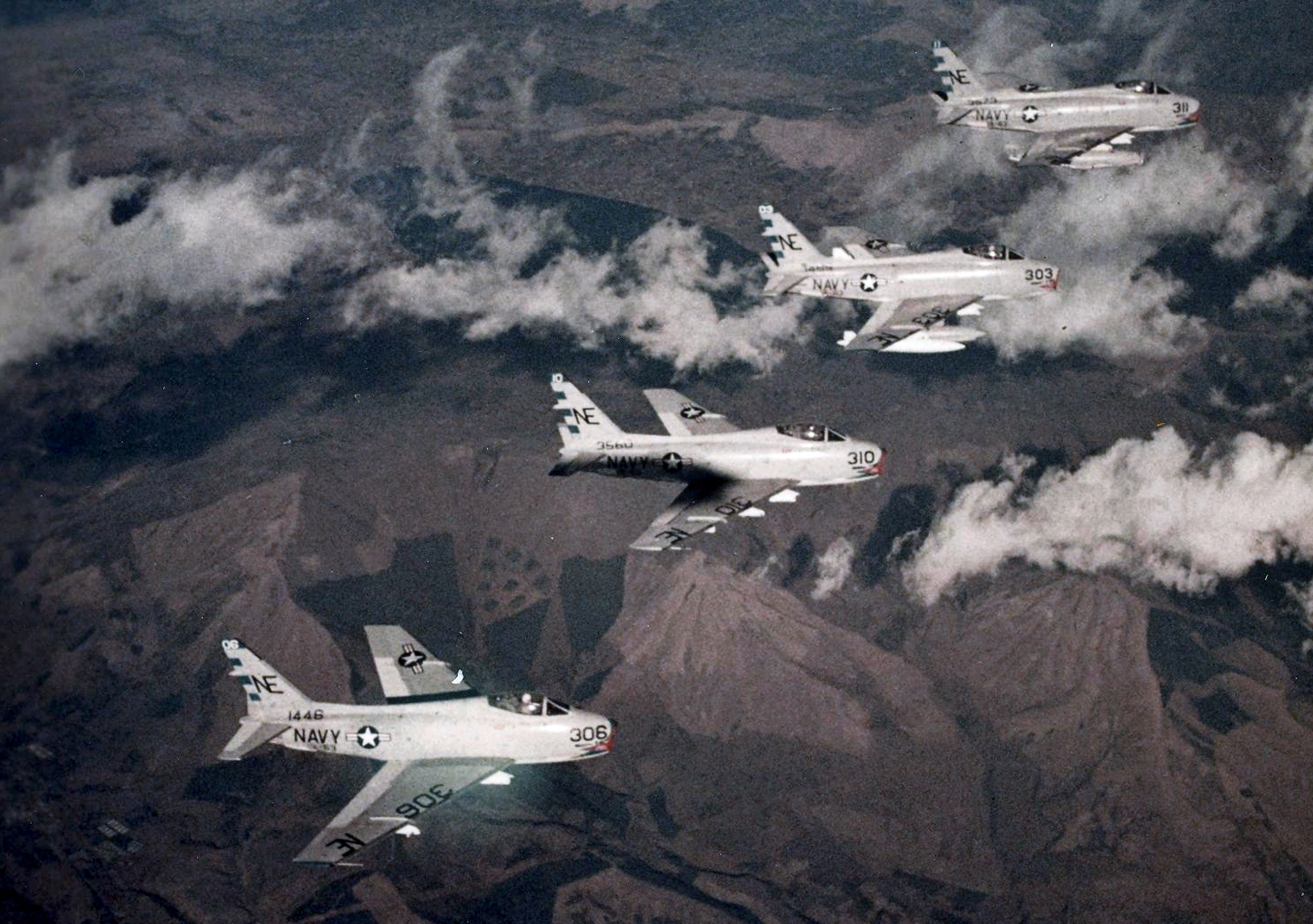
Four VA-63 FJ-4Bs in 1958.

Family tree of Sabre & Fury variants

XFJ-4
Two prototypes with a J65-W-4 engine and re-designed fuselage.
YFJ-4
One FJ-4 used for development testing.
FJ-4 Fury
Single-seat fighter-bomber version, powered by a 7,700 lbf (34 kN) Wright J65-W-16A turbojet engine, 150 built.
FJ-4B Fury
Single-seat ground-attack close support version with six underwing pylons, 222 built.
FJ-4F Fury
Test and evaluation aircraft, fitted with an auxiliary rocket motor and supplementary fuel tank, two conversions from FJ-4.
F-1E Fury
Redesignation of the FJ-4.
AF-1E Fury
Redesignation of the FJ-4B.
AF-1F (NA-295)
Proposed light-attack version with TF30 engine, competitor to the A-7; not built.

== Operators ==
United States

- United States Navy
- United States Marine Corps

== Surviving aircraft ==
=== On display ===
FJ-4

- 139486 - National Naval Aviation Museum, NAS Pensacola, Florida.
- 139516 - Historic Aviation Memorial Museum in Tyler, Texas.

FJ-4B

- 139531 - Pima Air & Space Museum, adjacent to Davis-Monthan AFB in Tucson, Arizona.
- 143557 - Georgia Veterans Memorial State Park in Cordele, Georgia.
- 143568 - Wings of Freedom Aviation Museum in Horsham, Pennsylvania.
- 143575 - was privately owned in San Antonio, Texas. However, it has been reported as sold and the FAA certificate is expired.
- 143610 - The Buffalo and Erie County Naval & Military Park in Buffalo, New York.

== Specifications (FJ-4) ==
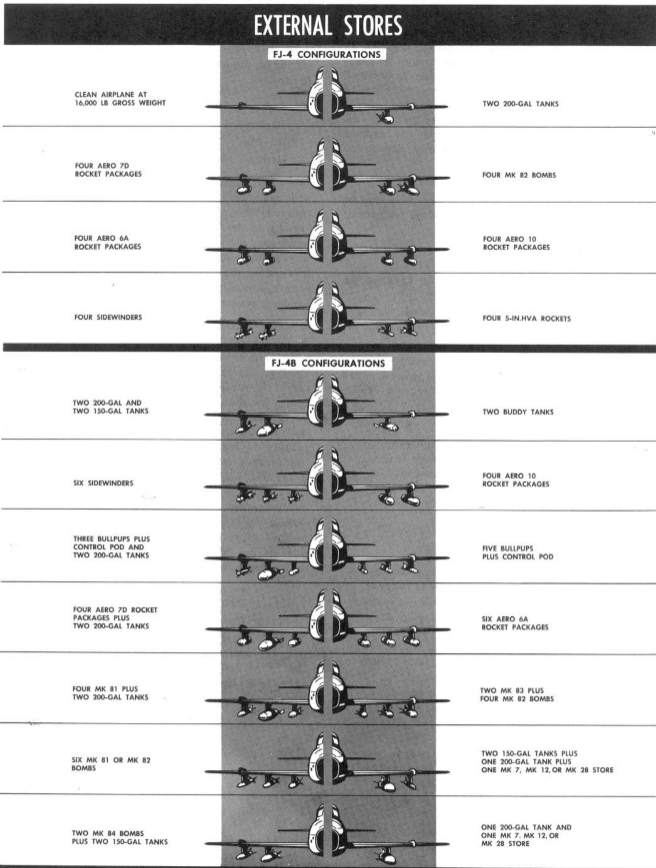
External stores for FJ-4 and FJ-4B as per NAVAER 01-60JKD-501A

Data from American Military Aircraft, NAVAER 01-60JKD-501A

General characteristics

- Crew: 1
- Length: 36 ft 4 in (11.1 m)
- Wingspan: 39 ft 1 in (11.9 m)
- Height: 13 ft 11 in (4.2 m)
- Wing area: 338.66 sq ft (31.46 m^{2})
- Empty weight: 13,210 lb (6,000 kg)
- Gross weight: 20,130 lb (9,200 kg)
- Max takeoff weight: 23,700 lb (10,750 kg)
- Powerplant: 1 × Wright J65-W-16A turbojet, 7,700 lbf (34 kN) thrust

Performance

- Maximum speed: 680 mph (1,094 km/h, 590 kn) at sea level
- Range: 2,020 mi (3,250 km, 1,760 nmi) with 2× 200 gal (760 L) drop tanks and 2× AIM-9 missiles
- Service ceiling: 46,800 ft (14,300 m)
- Rate of climb: 7,660 ft/min (38.9 m/s)
- Wing loading: 69.9 lb/sq ft (341.7 kg/m^{2})

Armament

- Guns: 4 × 20 mm (0.787 in) Colt Mk 12 cannon (144 rpg, 576 rounds in total)
- Rockets: 4 × (6 x FJ-4B) 70mm rocket pods, 4x LAU-10 Zuni rocket pods
- Missiles: 4 × AIM-9 Sidewinder missiles (6 x AIM-9 Sidewinder FJ-4B), 5x AGM-12 Bullpup + Control pod (FJ-4B)
- Bombs: up to 3,000 lb (1,400 kg) of underwing ordnance

== See also ==
Related development

- North American FJ-1 Fury
- North American FJ-2/-3 Fury
- North American F-86 Sabre
- North American F-100 Super Sabre

Aircraft of comparable role, configuration, and era

- CAC Sabre
- Dassault Mystère IV
- McDonnell F3H Demon
- Mikoyan-Gurevich MiG-17
- Republic F-84F Thunderstreak
- Supermarine Scimitar

Related lists

- List of fighter aircraft
- List of military aircraft of the United States
- List of Sabre and Fury units in US military
