= VA-215 =

VA-215 may refer to:

- Virginia State Route 215
- VA-215 (U.S. Navy) (1955–1967)
- Second VA-215 (U.S. Navy) (1968–1977)
