= VA-93 =

VA-93 may refer to:

- VA-93 (U.S. Navy)
- State Route 93 (Virginia)
