= Operation Linebacker =

Part of the Vietnam War (1972)

- Part of the Vietnam War
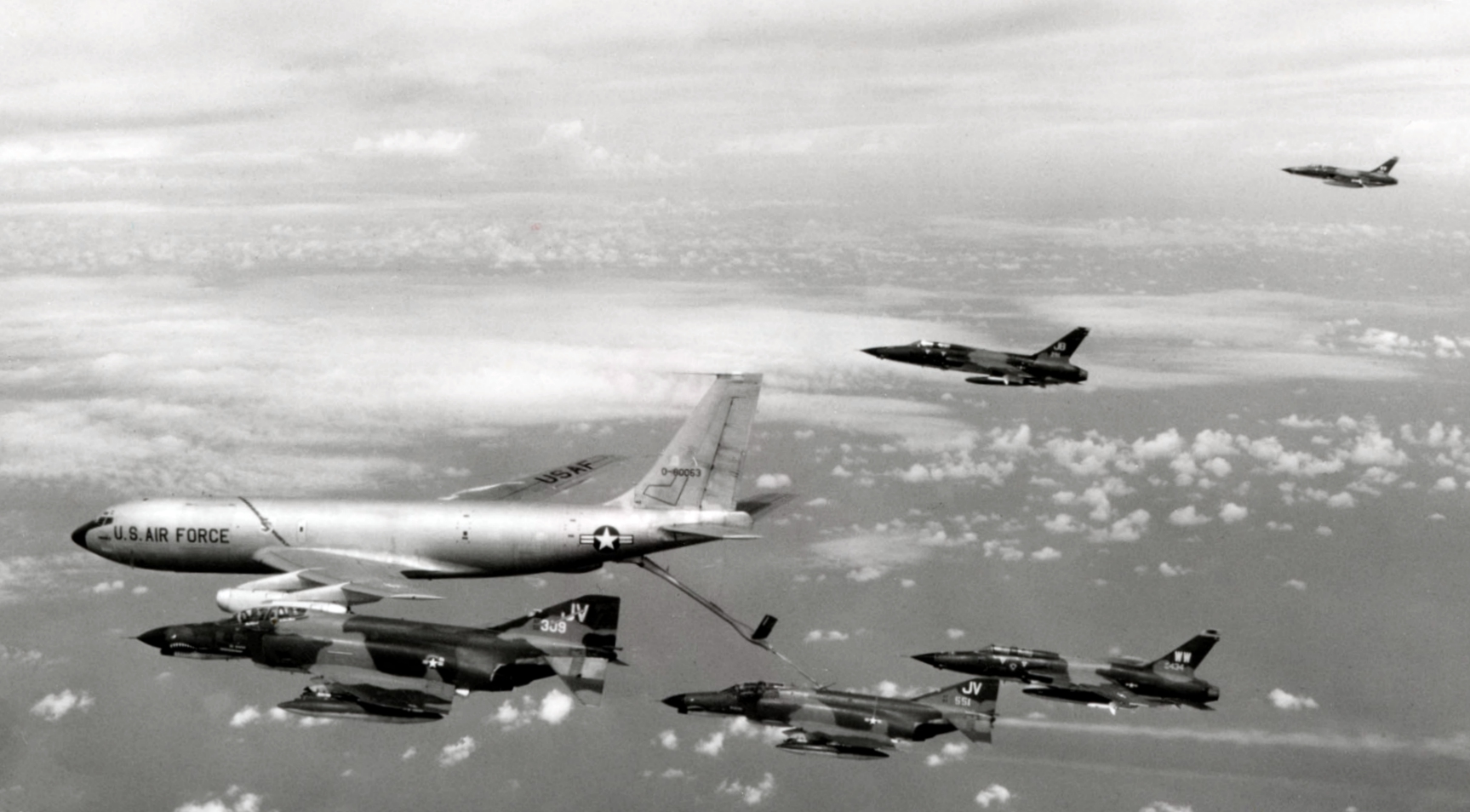
- A 388th TFW SAM hunter-killer team refueling on its way to North Vietnam, October 1972
Date	9 May – 23 October 1972
Location	North Vietnam
Result	Both sides claim victory

Belligerents
United States; South Vietnam	North Vietnam

Commanders and leaders
John W. Vogt Jr. Damon W. Cooper	Nguyen Van Tien

Casualties and losses
(United States) 134 aircraft lost in combat or operational accidents (excluding the number of aircraft that were badly damaged beyond repair) (South Vietnam) 10 aircraft lost North Vietnamese claim: 651 aircraft shot down, 80 warships sunk or damaged	U.S. claim: 63 aircraft shot down North Vietnamese claim: 47 aircraft shot down (26 MiG-21s, 5 MiG-19s and 16 MiG-17s)

Operation Linebacker was the codename of a U.S. Seventh Air Force and U.S. Navy Task Force 77 air interdiction campaign conducted against North Vietnam from 9 May to 23 October 1972, during the Vietnam War.

Its purpose was to halt or slow the transportation of supplies and materials for the Nguyen Hue Offensive (known in the West as the Easter Offensive), an invasion of the South Vietnam by the North Vietnamese People's Army of Vietnam (PAVN) that had been launched on 30 March. Linebacker was the first continuous bombing effort conducted against North Vietnam since the end of Operation Rolling Thunder in November 1968.

== Nguyen Hue Offensive ==
At midday on 30 March 1972, 30,000 PAVN troops, supported by regiments of tanks and artillery, rolled southward across the Demilitarized Zone (DMZ) that separated the two Vietnams. This three-division force caught the Army of the Republic of Vietnam (ARVN) and their American allies unprepared. The PAVN force struck the defensive positions of the ARVN 3rd Division and threw it into disarray. ARVN forces then fell back, and a race began between both belligerents to the bridges at Đông Hà and Cam Lộ.

By 4 April, ARVN officers had patched together a defensive line that held the PAVN at bay, but it was only a temporary respite. Although the conventional attack by the PAVN, which included the extensive use of armor and heavy artillery, riveted the attention of the allies on the northern provinces, it was only the first of three such operations that were launched that spring. On 5 April, a PAVN force of 20,000 crossed the border from their sanctuaries in Cambodia in another three-division, combined arms force to attack Bình Long Province, north of Saigon. They quickly seized the town of Lộc Ninh and then surrounded the town of An Lộc, cutting the road to the capital.

On 12 April, the PAVN struck again, this time moving in from eastern Laos and seizing a series of border outposts around Đắk Tô in Kon Tum Province in the Central Highlands. The PAVN then proceeded east toward the provincial capital of Kon Tum. Hanoi had initiated the offensive to coincide with the winter monsoon, when continuous rain and low cloud cover made air support difficult.

The initial U.S. response to the offensive was lackadaisical and confused. The Pentagon was not unduly alarmed and the U.S. Ambassador to South Vietnam and Commander, U.S. Military Assistance Command, Vietnam, General Creighton W. Abrams, were both out of the country. President Richard Nixon's first response was to consider a three-day attack by Boeing B-52 Stratofortress heavy bombers on Hanoi and the port city of Haiphong. His National Security Advisor, Dr. Henry Kissinger, convinced Nixon to reconsider, since he did not want to jeopardize the formalization of the Strategic Arms Limitation Treaty (SALT I) with the Soviet Union, that was due to be signed in May. Another stumbling block to the plan was Abrams' desire to utilize the available bombers (with their all-weather capability) to support the ARVN defense.

Nixon and Kissinger considered a plan offered by the Joint Chiefs of Staff to be both unimaginative and lacking in aggression. On 4 April, Nixon authorized the bombing of North Vietnam (which had been limited to reprisal raids just above the DMZ) up to the 18th parallel. To prevent a total ARVN collapse and to protect American prestige during the upcoming summit meeting with Soviet general secretary Leonid Brezhnev, Nixon decided to risk a massive escalation of force.

Due to the continuous withdrawal of American forces as part of the policy of Vietnamization, at the time of the invasion fewer than 10,000 U.S. combat troops remained in South Vietnam, and most of them were scheduled to leave within the next six months. The number of combat aircraft stationed in Southeast Asia was less than half that of its peak strength in 1968–1969. At the beginning of 1972, the U.S. Air Force (USAF) had only three squadrons of McDonnell Douglas F-4 Phantom II fighter-bombers and one squadron of Cessna A-37 Dragonfly light attack aircraft, a total of 76 aircraft, stationed in South Vietnam. Another 114 fighter-bombers were located at bases in Thailand. 83 B-52s were stationed at U-Tapao RTAFB, Thailand and at Andersen Air Force Base, Guam. The U.S. Navy (USN)'s Task Force 77 (stationed in the Gulf of Tonkin), had four aircraft carriers assigned to it, but only two were available at any one time to conduct operations. Their air wings had approximately 140 aircraft.

== Build-up and air attacks ==
American and Republic of Vietnam Air Force (RVNAF) aircraft had been supporting the defense (weather permitting) since the beginning of the offensive. These strikes were conducted in support of ARVN forces, and included those of the air wings of the carriers USS Coral Sea and USS Hancock. The bad weather limited the ability of the U.S. aircraft to assist in stemming the North Vietnamese onslaught. By 6 April, at naval and air bases around the globe, American forces were put on alert and ships and aircraft squadrons began moving toward Southeast Asia.

The U.S. began a rapid build-up of airpower. The USAF deployed 176 F-4s and 12 F-105 Thunderchiefs from bases in the Republic of Korea and the U.S. to Thailand between 1 April and 11 May in Operation Constant Guard. Strategic Air Command (SAC) dispatched 124 B-52s from the U.S. to Guam bringing the total B-52 strength available for operations to 209. The USN cut short its port period for the carriers USS Kitty Hawk and USS Constellation and ordered USS Midway, USS America and USS Saratoga to augment the fleet so that four or more carrier air wings could conduct missions simultaneously. 7th Fleet assets in local waters were thereby increased from 84 to 138 ships.

USAF tactical strikes against North Vietnam north of the 20th parallel were authorized on 5 April under the nickname Freedom Train. The first mass B-52 raid directed against the north was conducted on 10 April when 12 B-52s, supported by 53 attack aircraft, struck petroleum storage facilities around Vinh. By 12 April, Nixon had informed Kissinger that he had decided on a more comprehensive bombing campaign which would include strikes against both Hanoi and Haiphong.

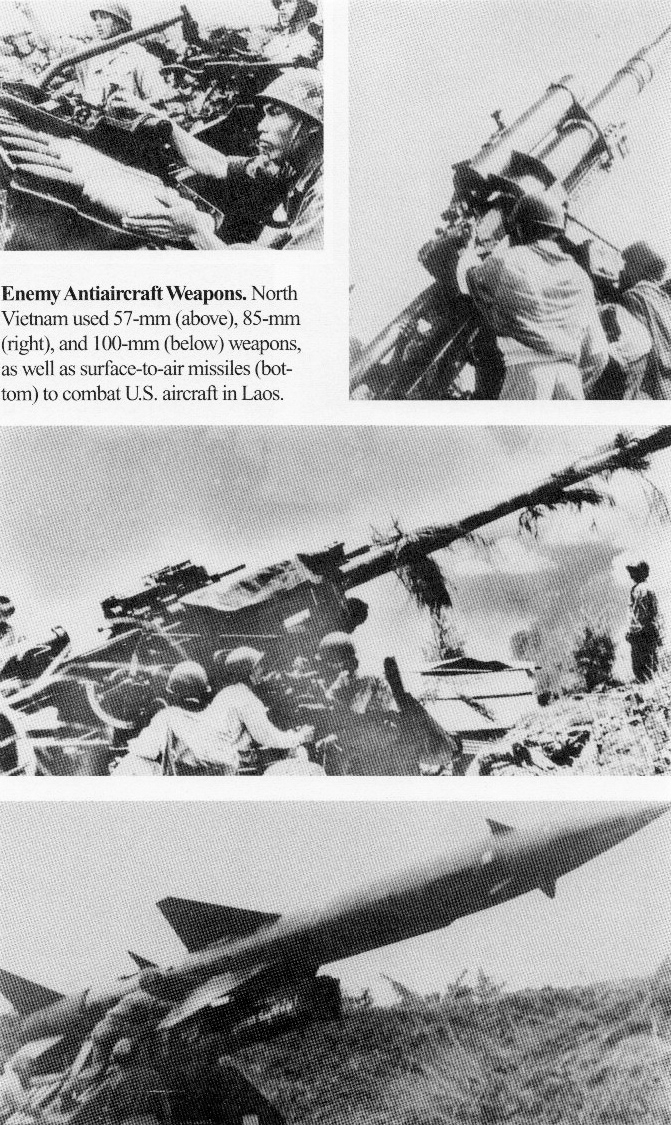
North Vietnamese anti-aircraft defense weapons

The following day 18 B-52s struck Thanh Hóa's Bai Thuong Air Base. Three more days followed before another strike, this time by another 18 bombers in a pre-dawn attack against an oil tank farm outside Haiphong. They were followed by more than 100 tactical aircraft attacking targets around Hanoi and Haiphong during daylight. Between 6 and 15 April, U.S. aircraft also struck and destroyed the Paul Doumer and Thanh Hóa bridges and the Yên Viên railway marshalling yard. This marked the introduction of laser-guided bombs against strategic targets in North Vietnam. Both bridges had previously been attacked unsuccessfully with conventional bombs and even missiles. The B-52s were then withdrawn from operations in the north and when they returned in June, their missions would be limited to South Vietnam.

By mid-month, nearly all of North Vietnam had been cleared for bombing raids for the first time in over three years. Air Force and Navy commanders and pilots were relieved that Nixon (unlike President Johnson) left the operational planning to local commanders and loosened the targeting restrictions that had hampered Operation Rolling Thunder. Between 1 May and 30 June B-52s, fighter-bombers, and gunships had flown 18,000 sorties against formidable anti-aircraft defenses with the loss of 29 aircraft.

The U.S. also now began what North Vietnamese historians have described as "using devious political and diplomatic schemes...to cut back the amount of aid being supplied to us by socialist nations". On 20 April Kissinger met secretly with Brezhnev in Moscow. Unwilling to jeopardize the normalisation of relations with the West and wary of Washington's growing relationship with Beijing, Brezhnev agreed to apply pressure to Hanoi to end the offensive and negotiate seriously.

Brezhnev then arranged for another secret meeting between Kissinger and Hanoi's lead negotiator Le Duc Tho, to be held on 2 May in Paris. On the day, the two men met for a session that Kissinger later described as "brutal and insulting." The North Vietnamese, sensing victory, were in no mood to make concessions. As a result of this meeting and the fall of Quảng Trị City Nixon was prepared to up the ante, stating that "the bastards have never been bombed like they're going to be bombed this time".

== Operation Pocket Money ==
On 27 April, ARVN defenses in Quảng Trị Province began to collapse. Due to conflicting orders from their high command, ARVN units joined an exodus of refugees heading southwards, abandoning Quảng Trị city. PAVN forces entered the city on the same day as the meeting between Kissinger and Le Duc Tho. The PAVN offensive had become a massive conventional military operation that was being conducted on three fronts simultaneously, involving the equivalent of 15 divisions and 600 tanks. As the North Vietnamese continued to gain ground in three of South Vietnam's four military regions, the U.S. Joint Chiefs of Staff updated their contingency plans (drawn up before the bombing halt of 1968) for the resumption of bombing in the north and recommended it to the President, who approved it on 8 May.

Shortly after his inauguration, Nixon had ordered the preparation of a contingency plan, one that would hopefully bring the Vietnam War to an end. Operation Duck Hook was to include an invasion of the North and included a proposal to mine its major harbors. The plan had been shelved at the time as too extreme but it had not been forgotten. The USN had also been updating its own contingency plans for just such a mining operation since 1965. On 5 May, Nixon ordered the Joint Chiefs to prepare to execute the aerial mining portion of the Duck Hook plan within three days under the operational title Pocket Money.

At precisely 09:00 (local time) on 9 May, six US Navy A-7 Corsair IIs and three A-6 Intruders from the USS Coral Sea flew into Haiphong harbor and dropped thirty-six 1,000-pound (450 kg) Mark-52 and Mark-55 naval mines into its waters. They were protected from attacks by Vietnam People's Air Force (VPAF) MiG fighter aircraft by the guided-missile cruisers Chicago and Long Beach, with several destroyers including the guided-missile destroyer USS Berkeley launching Operation Custom Tailor and by supporting flights of F-4 Phantoms. The reason for the precise timing of the strike became apparent when Nixon simultaneously delivered a televised speech explaining the escalation to the American people: "The only way to stop the killing is to take the weapons of war out of the hands of the international outlaws of North Vietnam.". The mines were activated five days after their delivery to allow any vessels then in port to escape without damage. Over the next three days other US carrier-based aircraft laid 11,000 more mines into North Vietnam's secondary harbors, blockading all maritime commerce for the country.

Before and during Pocket Money, Nixon and Kissinger had worried about the Soviet and Chinese reaction to the escalation. Hours before Nixon's speech announcing the mining, Kissinger had delivered a letter to Soviet ambassador Anatoly Dobrynin which outlined the U.S. plan, but which also made clear Nixon's willingness to proceed with the summit. The next day, Nixon shook the hand of Soviet Foreign Trade Minister Nikolai Patolichev at the White House. Although Moscow and Beijing publicly denounced the American operation, they were not willing to jeopardize their thawing relationship with the U.S. and Hanoi's requests for support and aid from its socialist allies met with only cool responses.

== Going north ==
Operation Linebacker, the code name for the new interdiction campaign, would have four objectives: to isolate North Vietnam from its sources of supply by destroying railroad bridges and rolling stock in and around Hanoi and north-eastwards toward the Chinese frontier; the targeting of primary storage areas and marshalling yards; to destroy storage and transshipment points and to eliminate (or at least damage) the North's air defense system. With nearly 85 percent of North Vietnam's imports (which arrived by sea) blocked by Pocket Money, the administration and the Pentagon believed that this would cut its final lines of communication with its socialist allies. China alone shipped an average of 22,000 tons of supplies a month over two rail lines and eight major roads that linked it with North Vietnam.

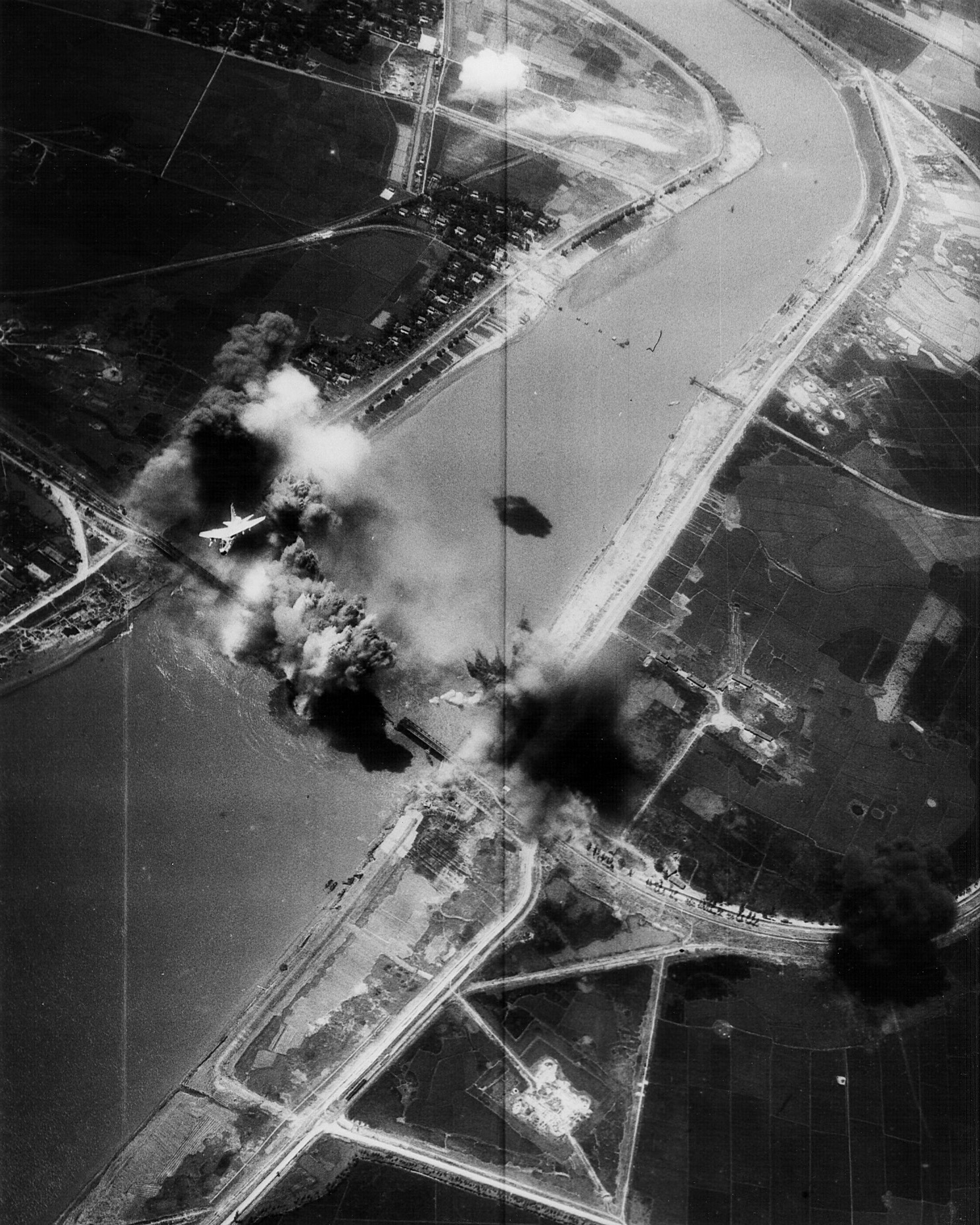
VA-195 A-7E bombing the Hải Dương bridge, 10 May 1972

On 10 May Operation Linebacker began with mass bombing operations against North Vietnam by tactical fighter aircraft of the Seventh Air Force and Task Force 77. Their targets included the railroad switching yards at Yên Viên and the Paul Doumer Bridge, on the northern outskirts of Hanoi. A total of 414 sorties were flown on the first day of the operation, 120 by the Air Force and 294 by the Navy and they encountered the heaviest single day of air-to-air combat during the Vietnam War. The U.S claimed 11 VPAF MiGs (four MiG-21s and seven MiG-17s) and two Air Force F-4s shot down. The VPAF confirmed two MiG-21s, three MiG-17s and one MiG-19 shot down, and they claimed 7 F-4s were shot down (after the war, 5 F-4s shot down were confirmed) Anti-aircraft artillery and surface-to-air missile firings also brought down two USN aircraft (one of which was flown by aces Duke Cunningham and William P. Driscoll).

By the end of the month, American aircraft had destroyed 13 bridges along the rail lines running from Hanoi to the Chinese border. Another four were destroyed between the capital and Haiphong, including the notorious Thanh Hóa Bridge. Several more bridges were brought down along the rail line leading to the south toward the DMZ. Targets were then switched to petroleum and oil storage and transportation networks and North Vietnamese airfields. There was an immediate impact on the battlefield in South Vietnam. Shelling by PAVN artillery dropped off by one-half between 9 May and 1 June. This slowdown was not due to an immediate shortage of artillery shells, but rather to a desire to conserve ammunition. U.S. intelligence analysts believed that PAVN had enough stockpiled supplies to sustain their campaigns throughout the autumn.

The intensity of the bombing campaign was reflected by the sharp increase in the number of strike and support sorties flown in Southeast Asia as a whole: from 4,237 for all services, including the RVNAF, during the month preceding the invasion, to 27,745 flown in support of ARVN forces from the beginning of April to the end of June (20,506 of them flown by the Air Force). B-52s provided an additional 1,000 sorties during the same period. The North was feeling the pressure, admitting in the official PAVN history that "between May and June only 30 percent of supplies called for in our plan actually reached the front-line units." In total, 41,653 Linebacker missions dropped 155,548 tons of bombs.

In addition to interdicting the road and rail system of North Vietnam, Linebacker also systematically attacked its air defense system. The VPAF, with approximately 200 interceptors, strongly contested these attacks throughout the campaign. Navy pilots, employing a mutually supporting "loose deuce" tactical formation and many with TOPGUN training, claimed a kill ratio of 6:1 in their favor in May and June, such that after that the VPAF rarely engaged them thereafter. In contrast, the USAF experienced a 1:1 kill ratio through the first two months of the campaign, as seven of its eventual 24 Linebacker air-to-air losses occurred without any corresponding VPAF loss in a twelve-day period between 24 June and 5 July. USAF pilots were hampered by use of the outdated "fluid four" tactical formations (a four-plane, two element formation in which only the leader did the shooting and in which the outside wingmen were vulnerable) dictated by service doctrine. Also contributing to the parity was a lack of air combat training against dissimilar aircraft, a deficient early warning system, and ECM pod formations that mandated strict adherence to formation flying. During August the introduction of real-time early warning systems, increased aircrew combat experience and degraded VPAF ground control interception capabilities reversed the trend to a more favorable, with 4:1 kill ratio were claimed.

During the operation, each side would ultimately claim favourable kill ratios. A total of 201 air battles took place between American and Vietnamese planes in 1972 sorties. The VPAF lost 47 MiGs (including 26 MiG-21s, 5 MiG-19s and 16 MiG-17s) and they claimed 90 U.S. aircraft were shot down, including 74 F-4 fighters and two RF-4C (MiG-21s shot down 67 enemy aircraft, MiG-17s shot down 11 and MiG-19s shot down 12 enemy aircraft

Linebacker saw several other "firsts". On the opening day of the operation, USN Lieutenant Duke Cunningham and his radar intercept officer, Lieutenant (j.g.) William P. Driscoll became the first U.S. air aces of the Vietnam War when they shot down their fifth MiG. On 28 August, the USAF gained its first ace when Captain Richard S. Ritchie downed his fifth enemy aircraft. Twelve days later, Captain Charles B. DeBellevue (who had been Ritchie's backseater during four of his five victories) downed two more MiGs, bringing his total to six. On 13 October another weapons officer, Captain Jeffrey S. Feinstein, was credited with his fifth MiG, making him the final Air Force ace.

== Operation Lion's Den ==
Although Linebacker was largely carried out by air, naval forces were also deployed to provide counter-battery fire against enemy targets along the coast and other important logistical areas and in support of ground troops. One such operation was Operation Lion's Den, or "The Battle of Haiphong Harbor". On the night of 27 August 1972, Vice Admiral James L. Holloway III took the heavy cruiser USS Newport News, the guided missile cruiser USS Providence, and the destroyers USS Robison and USS Rowan on a brief night raid against the North Vietnamese forces protecting the port of Haiphong. After the bombardment, the ships were threatened by four Soviet-built torpedo boats. Holloway's ships, and two aircraft from the USS Midway, sank all four torpedo boats. It was one of the few ship-to-ship naval battles of the war.

== Paris Peace Talks and conclusion ==
The stalled offensive in the South and the devastation in North Vietnam had helped to convince Hanoi to return to the bargaining table by early August. The meetings produced new concessions from Hanoi which promised to end the deadlock that had plagued negotiations since their inception in 1968. Gone were Hanoi's demands for the ouster of South Vietnamese President Nguyễn Văn Thiệu and his replacement by a coalition government in which the Viet Cong would participate. The U.S. on its part agreed to a cease fire in place which conceded that PAVN soldiers could remain in South Vietnam after a peace agreement. The diplomatic impasse was broken and Nixon ordered a halt to all bombing above the 20th parallel on 23 October and on 26 October Kissinger announced that "peace is at hand." This once again placed Hanoi and Haiphong off-limits, and halted Linebacker operations.

Air Force historian Earl Tilford has written that Linebacker was "a watershed in aerial warfare...it was the first modern aerial campaign in which precision guided munitions changed the way in which air power was used." It succeeded, where Rolling Thunder had failed, he claimed, for three reasons: Nixon was decisive in his actions and gave the military greater latitude in targeting; American airpower was forcefully and appropriately used; and the immense difference in the technology utilized made Linebacker the first bombing campaign in a "new era" of aerial warfare.

During and immediately following the PAVN offensive, U.S. Air Force, Navy and Marine Corps aviators had flown 18,000 sorties in the four northern provinces of South Vietnam and dropped 40,000 tons of ordnance in the Battle of An Lộc. Between March and May, B-52 sortie rates had climbed from 700 to 2,200 per month and they had dropped 57,000 tons of bombs in Quảng Trị Province alone. During Freedom Train and Linebacker proper, B-52s had dropped 150,237 tons of bombs on the North while Air Force and Navy tactical aircraft had flown 1,216 sorties and dropped another 5,000 tons of ordnance.

From the beginning of Freedom Train in April to the end of June 1972 the United States lost 52 aircraft over North Vietnam: 17 to missiles; 11 to anti-aircraft weapons; three to small arms fire; 14 to MiGs; and seven to unknown causes. During the same time period, the RVNAF lost ten aircraft. 63 VPAF aircraft were destroyed during the same time period. North Vietnam claimed that it had shot down 651 aircraft and sunk or set on fire 80 U.S. warships during the operation.

Linebacker had played a crucial role in blunting the northern offensive by drying up its vital sources of supply. PAVN had evolved into a conventional military force, and such a force depended upon a complex logistical system, which made it vulnerable to aerial attack. By September, imports into North Vietnam were estimated at 35 to 50 percent below what they had been in May, bolstering claims that the campaign had been successful in its interdiction effort. USAF General Robert N. Ginsburgh, of the Office of the Secretary of the Air Force, summed up the attitudes of U.S. commanders by remarking that Linebacker had "a greater impact in its first four months of operation than Rolling Thunder had in three and one-half years." Although Kissinger may have announced that peace was at hand, it was not going to come easily. American bombers would once again return to the skies of North Vietnam in 1972 during Operation Linebacker II before the American commitment to the Vietnam War came to an end.

=== North Vietnamese aircraft losses ===
(Air-to-air losses only, claimed by the U.S)

Dates	Service	MiG-21	MiG-19	MiG-17	Total
5 April – 9 May	USAF	4	1		5
	USN	2		2	4
10 May – 23 October	USAF	30	7		37
	USN	3	2	11	16
	USMC	1			1
VPAF Total		40	10	13	63

According to the VPAF, they lost 47 MiGs in aircombat (including 26 MiG-21s, 5 MiG-19s and 16 MiG-17s)

=== U.S. aircraft losses during Linebacker ===
Between 10 May and 23 October 1972, the United States lost a total of 134 aircraft either over the north or as a direct result of Linebacker missions. 104 were lost in combat and 30 were destroyed in operational accidents. Losses by service were:

USAF: – 70 total

- 51 combat losses (22 to MiGs, 5 induced losses, 20 to AAA, 4 to SAMs)
  - 43 F-4D/E Phantom II (+17 non-combat losses)
  - 2 RF-4C Photo Recon (+1 non-combat loss)
  - 4 F-105G Wild Weasel (+1 non-combat loss)
  - 2 F-111A "Aardvark"

USN: – 54 total

- 43 combat losses (4 to MiGs, 2 induced, 13 SAM, 27 AAA)
  - 8 F-4B/J Phantom II (+3 non-combat losses)
  - 22 A-7A/C/E Corsair II (+3 non-combat losses)
  - 3 A-6A Intruder
  - 2 F-8J Crusader (+3 non-combat losses)
  - 5 A-4F Skyhawk (+1 non-combat loss)
  - 1 RA-5C Vigilante
  - 2 RF-8G Photo Crusader (+1 non-combat loss)

USMC: – 10 total

- 10 combat losses (1 MiG, 1 SAM, 8 AAA)
  - 4 F-4J Phantom II
  - 2 A-4E Skyhawk
  - 4 A-6A Intruder

== U.S. air order of battle ==
=== Task Force 77 ===
USS Constellation; 1 October 1971 – 30 June 1972
Air Wing	Squadron	Aircraft Type
CVW-9	VF-92	F-4J Phantom II
CVW-9	VF-96	F-4J Phantom II
CVW-9	VA-146	A-7E Corsair II
CVW-9	VA-147	A-7E Corsair II
CVW-9	VA-165	A-6A & KA-6D Intruder

USS Coral Sea; 12 November 1971 – 17 July 1972
Air Wing	Squadron	Aircraft Type
CVW-15	VF-51	F-4B Phantom II
CVW-15	VF-111	F-4B Phantom II
CVW-15	VA-22	A-7E Corsair II
CVW-15	VA-94	A-7E Corsair II
CVW-15	VMA(AW)-224	A-6A & KA-6D Intruder

USS Hancock; 7 January 1972 to 3 October 1972
Air Wing	Squadron	Aircraft Type
CVW-21	VF-24	F-8J Crusader
CVW-21	VF-211	F-8J Crusader
CVW-21	VA-55	A-4F Skyhawk
CVW-21	VA-164	A-4F Skyhawk
CVW-21	VA-212	A-4F Skyhawk

USS Kitty Hawk; 17 February 1972 to 28 November 1972
Air Wing	Squadron	Aircraft Type
CVW-11	VF-114	F-4J Phantom II
CVW-11	VF-213	F-4J Phantom II
CVW-11	VA-192	A-7E Corsair II
CVW-11	VA-195	A-7E Corsair II
CVW-11	VA-52	A-6A & KA-6D Intruder

USS Midway; 10 April 1972 to 3 March 1973
Air Wing	Squadron	Aircraft Type
CVW-5	VF-151	F-4B Phantom II
CVW-5	VF-161	F-4B Phantom II
CVW-5	VA-56	A-7B Corsair II
CVW-5	VA-93	A-7B Corsair II
CVW-5	VA-115	A-6A & KA-6D Intruder

USS Saratoga; 11 April 1972 to 13 February 1973
Air Wing	Squadron	Aircraft Type
CVW-3	VF-31	F-4J Phantom II
CVW-3	VF-103	F-4J Phantom II
CVW-3	VA-37	A-7A Corsair II
CVW-3	VA-105	A-7A Corsair II
CVW-3	VA-75	A-6A & KA-6D Intruder

USS America; 5 June 1972 to 24 March 1973
Air Wing	Squadron	Aircraft Type
CVW-8	VF-74	F-4J Phantom II
CVW-8	VMFA-333	F-4J Phantom II
CVW-8	VA-82	A-7C Corsair II
CVW-8	VA-86	A-7C Corsair II
CVW-8	VA-35	A-6A & KA-6D Intruder

USS Oriskany; 5 June 1972 to 30 March 1973
Air Wing	Squadron	Aircraft Type
CVW-19	VF-191	F-8J Crusader
CVW-19	VF-194	F-8J Crusader
CVW-19	VA-153	A-7A Corsair II
CVW-19	VA-155	A-7B Corsair II
CVW-19	VA-215	A-7B Corsair II

=== USMC ===
1st Marine Aircraft Wing, Marine Aircraft Group 15
Base	Squadron	Aircraft Type	Notes
Danang AB, RVN April 1972 to June 1972; Nam Phong RTAB, Thailand June 1972 to August 1973	Marine Fighter Attack Squadron 115	F-4B Phantom II	Deployed from MCAS Iwakuni; 6 April 1972 – 31 August 1973
Danang AB, RVN April 1972 to June 1972; Nam Phong RTAB, Thailand June 1972 to August 1973	Marine Fighter Attack Squadron 212	F-4J Phantom II	Deployed from MCAS Kaneohe Bay; 14 April 1972 – 20 June 1972
Danang AB, RVN April 1972 to June 1972; Nam Phong RTAB, Thailand June 1972 to August 1973	Marine Fighter Attack Squadron 232	F-4J Phantom II	Deployed from MCAS Iwakuni; 6 April 1972 – 1 September 1973
Danang AB, RVN April 1972 to June 1972; Nam Phong RTAB, Thailand June 1972 to August 1973	Marine All-Weather Attack Squadron 533	A-6A Intruder	Deployed from MCAS Iwakuni; 21 June 1972 – August 1973

Marine Aircraft Group 12
Base	Squadron	Aircraft Type	Notes
Bien Hoa Air Base, RVN	Marine Attack Squadron 211	A-4E Skyhawk	Deployed from Naha Air Force Base, Okinawa; 17 May 1972 – 30 January 1973
Bien Hoa Air Base, RVN	Marine Attack Squadron 311	A-4E Skyhawk	Deployed from MCAS Iwakuni; 17 May 1972 – 30 January 1973

=== Seventh Air Force ===
8th Tactical Fighter Wing, Ubon RTAFB, Thailand
Squadron	Aircraft Type	Notes
25th Tactical Fighter Squadron	F-4D Phantom II	
433rd Tactical Fighter Squadron	F-4D Phantom II	
435th Tactical Fighter Squadron	F-4D Phantom II	
497th Tactical Fighter Squadron	F-4D Phantom II	
Constant Guard I
334th Tactical Fighter Squadron	F-4E Phantom II	Deployed from 4th TFW, Seymour-Johnson AFB, North Carolina; 11 April 1972 – 5 August 1972; 30 September 1972 – 18 March 1973
336th Tactical Fighter Squadron	F-4E Phantom II	Deployed from 4th TFW, Seymour-Johnson AFB, North Carolina; 12 April 1972 – 30 September 1972; 9 March 1973 – 7 September 1973
Temporary Duty (TDY)
335th Tactical Fighter Squadron	F-4E Phantom II	Deployed from 4th TFW, Seymour-Johnson AFB, North Carolina; 6 July 1972 – 22 December 1972

49th Tactical Fighter Wing, Takhli RTAFB, Thailand
Constant Guard III
Squadron	Aircraft Type	Notes
7th Tactical Fighter Squadron	F-4D Phantom II	Deployed from Holloman AFB, New Mexico; 11 May 1972 – 12 August 1972
8th Tactical Fighter Squadron	F-4D Phantom II	Deployed from Holloman AFB, New Mexico; 12 May 1972 – 2 October 1972
9th Tactical Fighter Squadron	F-4D Phantom II	Deployed from Holloman AFB, New Mexico; 13 May 1972 – 5 October 1972
417th Tactical Fighter Squadron	F-4D Phantom II	Deployed from Holloman AFB, New Mexico; 10 May 1972 – 30 September 1972

474th Tactical Fighter Wing, Takhli RTAFB, Thailand
Constant Guard V
Squadron	Aircraft Type	Notes
429th Tactical Fighter Squadron	F-111A	Deployed from Nellis AFB, Nevada; 26 September 1972
430th Tactical Fighter Squadron	F-111A	Deployed from Nellis AFB, Nevada; 26 September 1972

56th Special Operations Wing, Nakhon Phanom RTAFB, Thailand
Squadron	Aircraft Type	Notes
1st Special Operations Squadron	A-1 Skyraider	
21st Special Operations Squadron	CH-53 Sea Stallion	

366th Tactical Fighter Wing, Danang AB, RVN; transferred to Takhli RTAFB, Thailand 27 June 1972
Squadron	Aircraft Type	Notes
4th Tactical Fighter Squadron	F-4E Phantom II	Transferred to Takhli RTAFB, Thailand; 27 June 1972
390th Tactical Fighter Squadron	F-4D Phantom II	Transferred to the 347th TFW, Mountain Home Air Force Base, Idaho; 30 June 1972
421st Tactical Fighter Squadron	F-4E Phantom II	Transferred to Takhli RTAFB, Thailand; 27 June 1972
Commando Fly
35th Tactical Fighter Squadron	F-4D Phantom II	Deployed from 3rd TFW, Kunsan AB, Korea; 3 April – 12 Jun 1972; Deployed to Korat RTAFB, Thailand, 13 June – 12 Oct 1972

388th Tactical Fighter Wing, Korat RTAFB, Thailand
Squadron	Aircraft Type	Notes
34th Tactical Fighter Squadron	F-4E Phantom II	
469th Tactical Fighter Squadron	F-4E Phantom II	Inactivated 31 October 1972
17th Wild Weasel Squadron	F-105G Thunderchief	
Constant Guard I
561st Tactical Fighter Squadron	F-105G Thunderchief	Deployed from 23rd TFW, McConnell AFB, Kansas; 11 April 1972 – 27 January 1973

432d Tactical Reconnaissance Wing, Udorn RTAFB, Thailand
Squadron	Aircraft Type	Notes
13th Tactical Fighter Squadron	F-4D Phantom II	
14th Tactical Reconnaissance Squadron	RF-4C Phantom II	
555th Tactical Fighter Squadron	F-4D Phantom II	
Commando Flash
523rd Tactical Fighter Squadron	F-4D Phantom II	Deployed from 405th TFW, Clark AB, Philippines; 9 April – 24 October 1972
Constant Guard II
308th Tactical Fighter Squadron	F-4E Phantom II	Deployed from 31st TFW, Homestead AFB, Florida; 28 April – 29 July 1972
58th Tactical Fighter Squadron	F-4E Phantom II	Deployed from 33d TFW, Eglin AFB, Florida; 29 April – 14 Oct 1972

43d Strategic Wing, Andersen AFB, Guam
Squadron	Aircraft Type	Notes
60th Bombardment Squadron (Provisional)	B-52D Stratofortress	
63rd Bombardment Squadron (Provisional)	B-52D Stratofortress	

72d Strategic Wing (Provisional), Anderson AFB, Guam
Squadron	Aircraft Type	Notes
64th Bombardment Squadron (Provisional)	B-52G Stratofortress	
65th Bombardment Squadron (Provisional)	B-52G Stratofortress	
329th Bombardment Squadron (Provisional)	B-52G Stratofortress	
486th Bombardment Squadron (Provisional)	B-52G Stratofortress	

307th Strategic Wing, U Tapao RTAFB, Thailand
Squadron	Aircraft Type	Notes
364th Bombardment Squadron	B-52D Stratofortress	
365th Bombardment Squadron	B-52D Stratofortress	

== See also ==
- USS Kitty Hawk riot
