= VA-215 (U.S. Navy) =

Attack Squadron 215
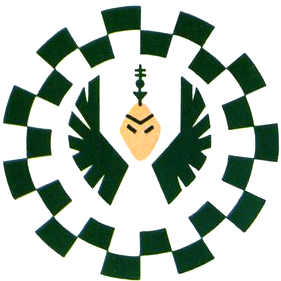
- VA-215 squadron patch
- Active: 22 June 1955 – 31 August 1967
- Country: United States
- Branch: United States Navy
- Role: Attack aircraft
- Part of: Inactive
- Nickname(s): Barn Owls
- Engagements: Second Taiwan Strait Crisis; Vietnam War

Aircraft flown
- Attack: A-1 Skyraider

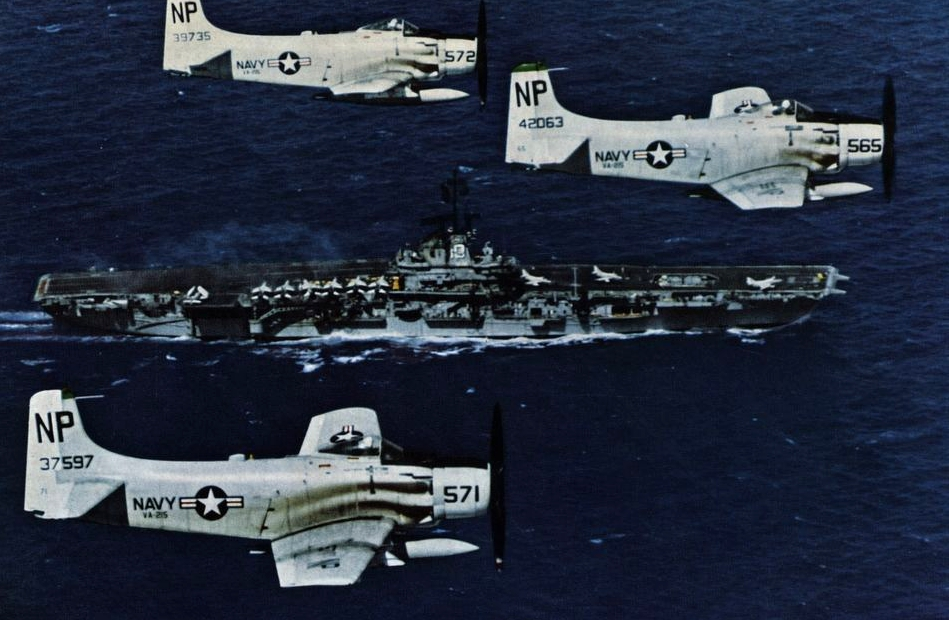
VA-215 A-1H Skyraiders fly over USS Hancock, 1963.

VA-215, nicknamed the Barn Owls, was an Attack Squadron of the United States Navy. It was established 22 June 1955, and disestablished on 31 August 1967.

A second VA-215 was established on 1 March 1968 and disestablished on 30 September 1977.

== Operational history ==
- August–November 1958: VA-215, operating from USS Lexington, conducted flight operations in the Formosa Straits due to the tension surrounding the Second Taiwan Strait Crisis.
- 24 March 1959: The squadron's commanding officer, Commander P. Rippa, was killed on a training flight in Yosemite Valley.
- March 1961: Lexington, with VA-215 embarked, operated off the coast of Thailand as a result of the deteriorating position of Laotian government forces against the Pathet Lao. Units of Lexington's air group flew reconnaissance missions over Laos.
- 15 April 1962: Embarked on USS Hancock, the squadron operated off the coast of South Vietnam during the arrival of the first U.S. Marine Corps (USMC) advisory unit in South Vietnam.
- May 1962: VA-215 and other CVG-21 squadrons from Hancock were prepared to support a U.S. Marine Corps unit that landed in Bangkok and moved by air to Udorn Royal Thai Air Force Base. The Marine landing was at the request of the Thai government because of its concerns surrounding the success of Pathet Lao forces along the Thai-Laotian border.
- September 1963: VA-215, embarked on Hancock, operated off the coast of Taiwan due to increased tensions between the People's Republic of China and the Republic of China.
- November 1963: VA-215, embarked on Hancock, operated off the coast of South Vietnam following the coup that overthrew President Diem.
- December 1964: Squadron aircraft participated in its first Operation Barrel Roll, armed reconnaissance and strike missions along infiltration routes in Laos.
- February 1965: Skyraiders from the squadron participated in Operation Flaming Dart, reprisal attacks against military targets in North Vietnam.
- March–May 1965: The squadron's Skyraiders participated in special operations in Southeast Asia, including Operation Rolling Thunder, strikes against designated military targets in North Vietnam.
- 5 March 1966: The squadron's commanding officer, Commander R. C. Hessom, was killed in action during a mission over North Vietnam.
- March 1966: Squadron aircraft participated in Operation Jackstay, providing close air support for amphibious operations that cleared the Rung Sat Special Zone, the river channels, southeast of Saigon.

== Home port assignments ==
The squadron was assigned to these home ports, effective on the dates shown:

- NAS Moffett Field – Jun 1955
- NAS Alameda – Dec 1963
- NAS Lemoore Dec 1964 – 1967

== Aircraft assignment ==
The squadron first received the following aircraft on the dates shown:

- AD-6/A-1H Skyraider – August 1955
- AD-7/A-1J Skyraider – June 1961

== See also ==
- List of squadrons in the Dictionary of American Naval Aviation Squadrons
- Attack aircraft
- List of inactive United States Navy aircraft squadrons
- History of the United States Navy
