= VA-164 (U.S. Navy) =

Attack Squadron 164
- Active: 1 September 1960 – 12 December 1975
- Country: United States
- Branch: United States Navy
- Role: Attack aircraft
- Part of: Inactive
- Nickname(s): Ghost Riders
- Engagements: Vietnam War

Aircraft flown
- Attack: A-4 Skyhawk

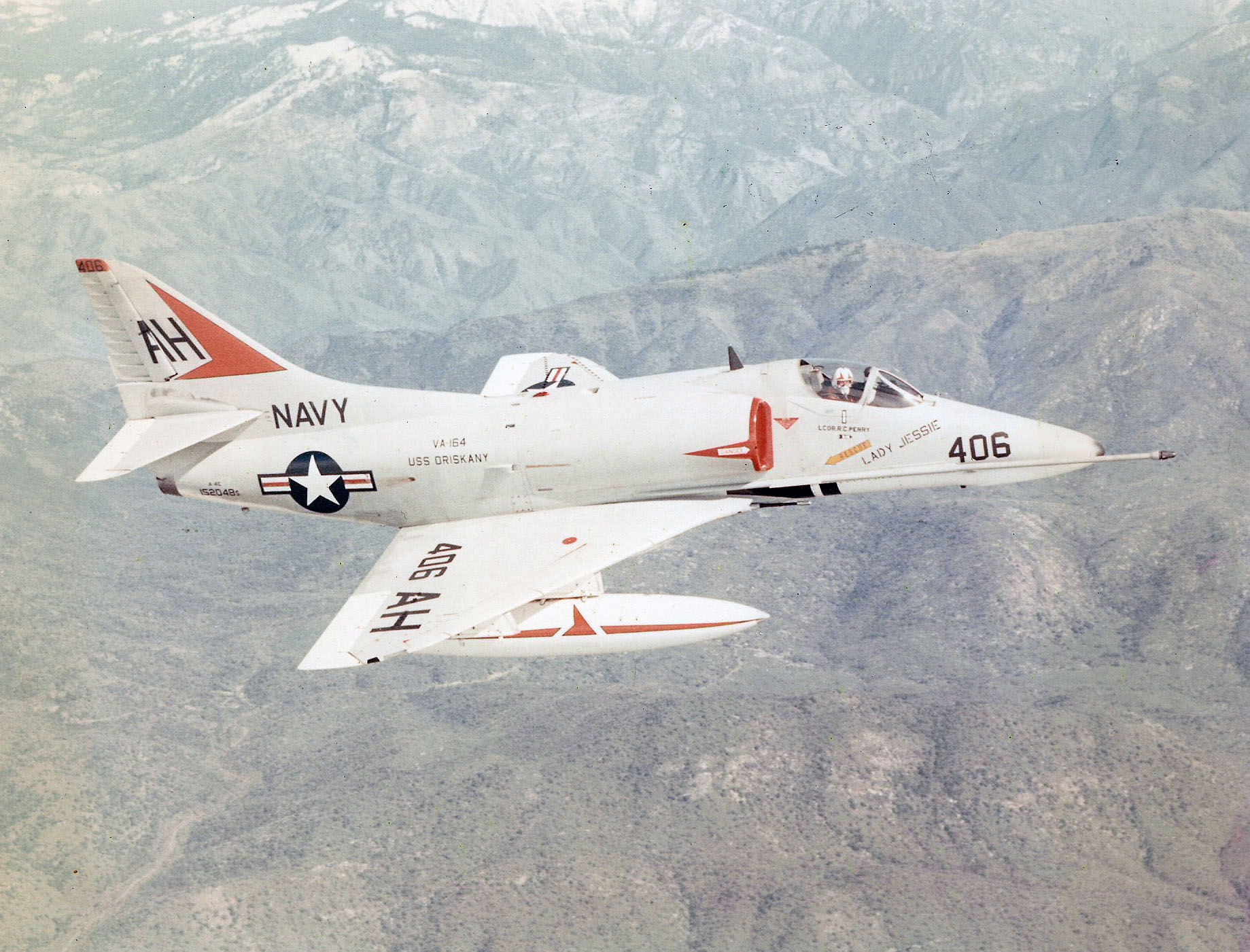
A-4E Skyhawk from VA-164 Ghost Riders in flight, 1966.

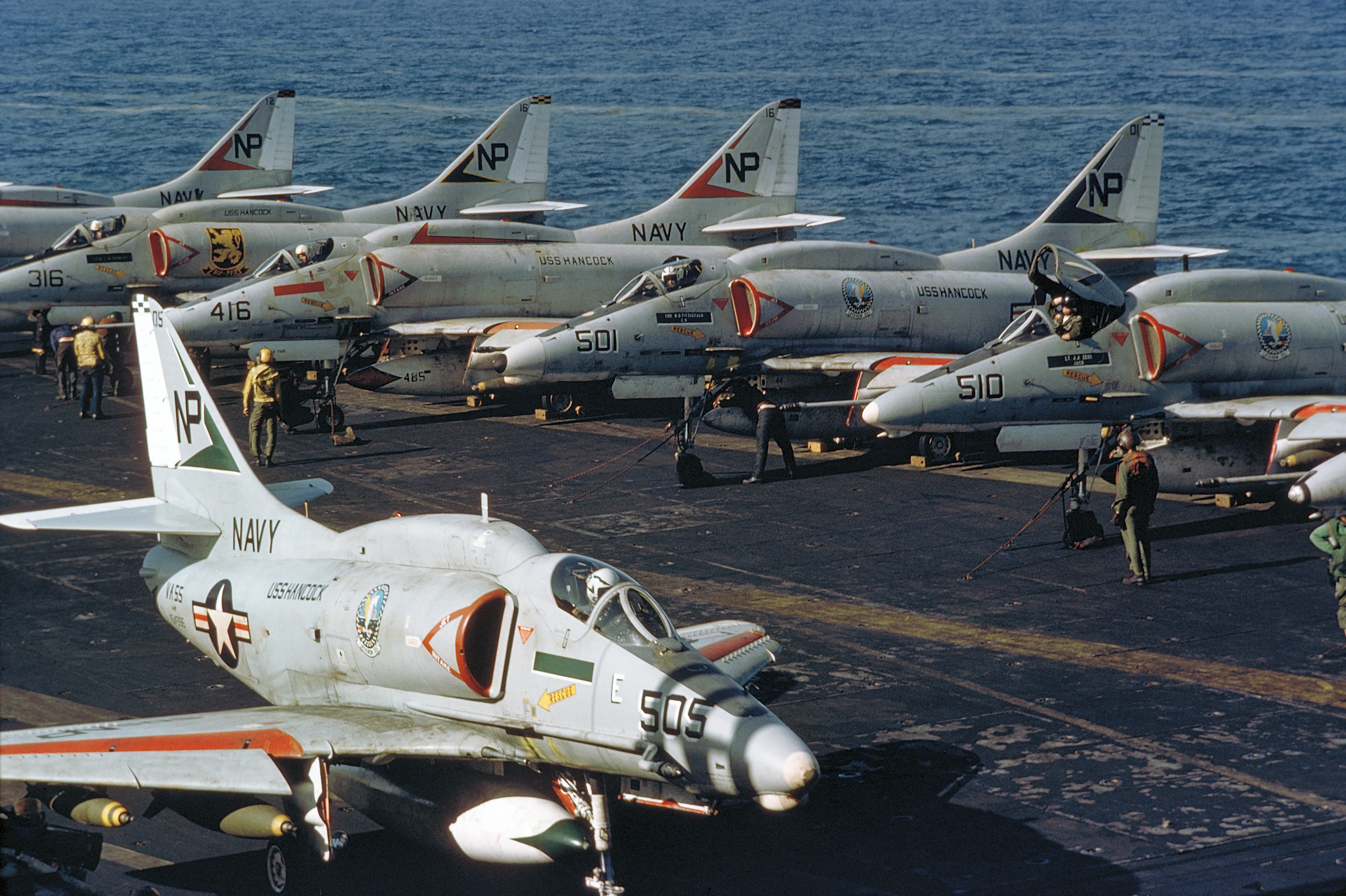
Armed A-4Fs including VA-164 on the USS Hancock in 1972

VA-164, nicknamed the Ghostriders, was an Attack Squadron of the United States Navy. It was established on 1 September 1960 and disestablished on 12 December 1975.

== Operational history ==
- 6 June 1962 embarked WestPac with USS Oriskany. October 1962 A4D-2s made nuclear weapon ready for launch during Cuban Missile Crisis. Returned San Diego 17 December 1962 – CAG-16 – - CVA 34
- November 1963: USS Oriskany, with VA-164 embarked, operated in the South China Sea during a crisis in South Vietnam and the coup that overthrew President Diem.
- 5 May 1965: The squadron flew its first combat sortie. From May through July 1965, it flew close air support missions in South Vietnam.
- 7 November 1965: The squadron's commanding officer, Commander J. D. Shaw, was awarded the Silver Star for successfully leading a strike against a SAM site in North Vietnam.
- 26 October 1966: A major fire broke out on Oriskany on Yankee Station. The squadron lost four officers in the fire. Several squadron personnel received awards for their heroic actions during the fire.
- 19 July 1967: Lieutenant Commander Richard D. Hartman was shot down near Hanoi, a helicopter crewman on an SH-3A from USS Hornet was killed during an attempted rescue and another SH-3A was shot down killing all 4 crewmen. Hartman died in captivity
- October 1967: Commander D. F. Mow, the squadron's commanding officer, was awarded the Silver Star for his actions during a combat mission over North Vietnam.
- March 1970: The squadron completed the last line period of its fifth combat deployment to Vietnam. This was the squadron's first combat deployment without losing a pilot.
- April 1972: The squadron participated in Operation Freedom Train, tactical air sorties against military and logistic targets in the southern part of North Vietnam. It also provided close air support for forces in South Vietnam following the Easter Offensive invasion by North Vietnam.
- May 1972: Squadron aircraft participated in the early phase of Operation Linebacker, heavy air strikes against targets in North Vietnam.
- August 1972: TA-4s acquired by VA-164 from the Marine Corps at MCAS Iwakuni were used for the first time operationally in a combat role from a carrier.
- June 1973: Missions were flown in support of Operation End Sweep, the clearing of mines in the territorial waters of North Vietnam.
- October 1973: With the outbreak of the Yom Kippur War USS Hancock, with VA-164 embarked, was directed to leave Yankee Station and operate in the Arabian Sea and Gulf of Aden.

== Home port assignments ==
The squadron was assigned to these home ports, effective on the dates shown:

- NAS Cecil Field – 1 September 1960
- NAS Lemoore – 26 September 1961

== Aircraft assignment ==
The squadron first received the following aircraft on the dates shown:

- A4D-2 Skyhawk – 7 October 1960
- A-4E Skyhawk – 13 March 1964
- A-4F Skyhawk – 6 April 1969
- TA-4F Skyhawk – 8 August 1972

== See also ==
- List of squadrons in the Dictionary of American Naval Aviation Squadrons
- Attack aircraft
- List of inactive United States Navy aircraft squadrons
- History of the United States Navy
