= VA-93 (U.S. Navy) =

Attack Squadron 93
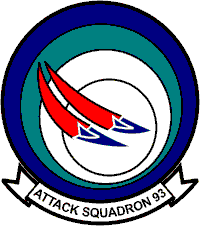
- VA-93 squadron insignia
- Active: 26 March 1952 – 31 August 1986
- Country: United States
- Branch: United States Navy
- Role: Attack aircraft
- Part of: Inactive
- Nickname(s): Blue Blazers (1954-76); Ravens (1976-86)
- Engagements: Korean War; Vietnam War

Aircraft flown
- Attack: FG-1D Corsair; F9F-2 Panther; A-4 Skyhawk; A-7A Corsair II

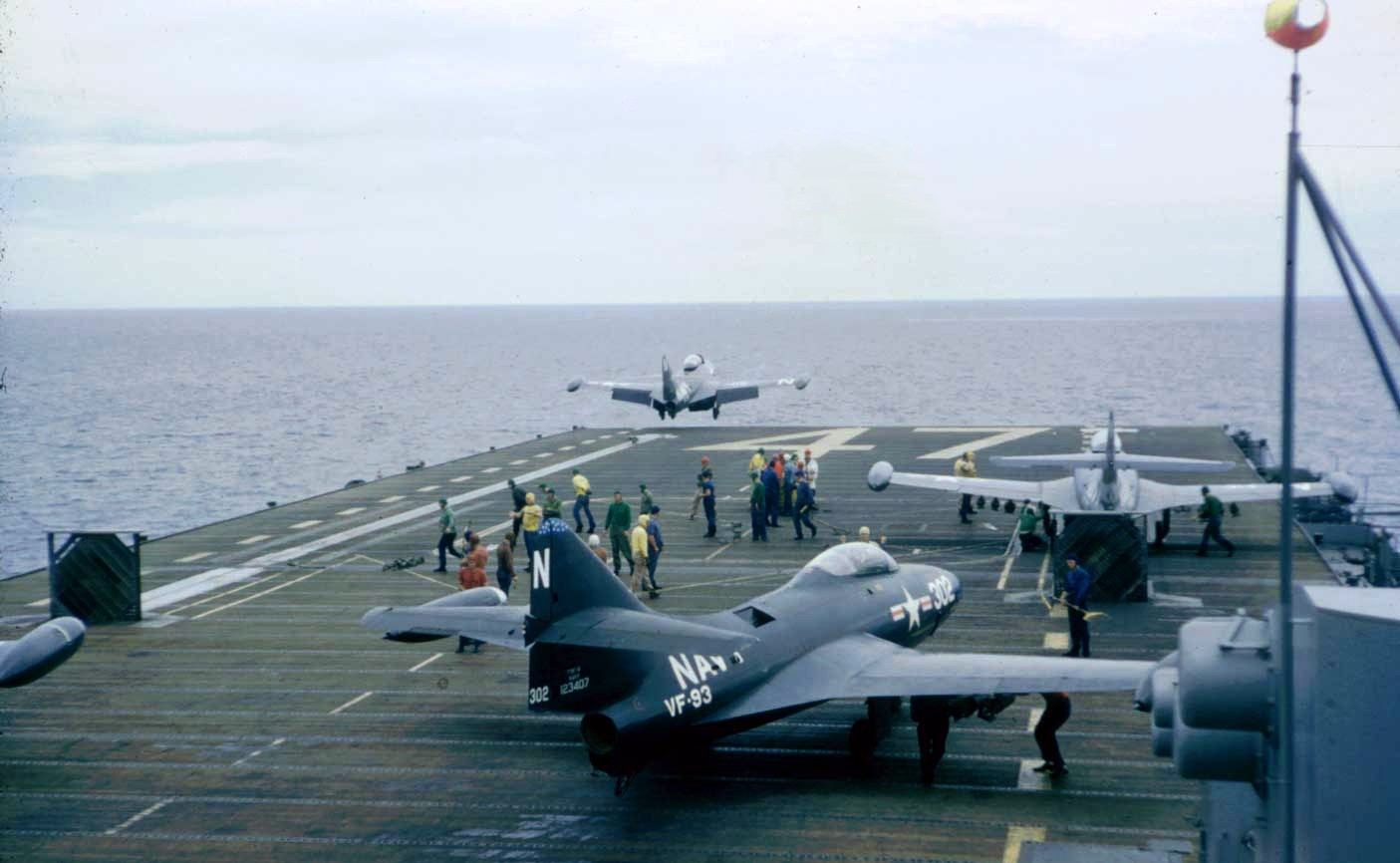
VF-93 F9F-2s launch from USS Philippine Sea c.1952

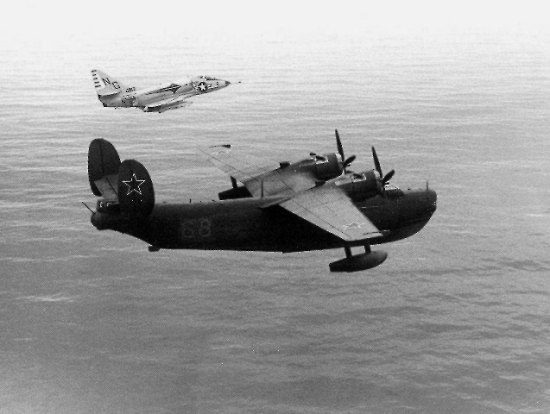
VA-93 A-4 intercepts a Soviet Be-6 near Japan in 1964

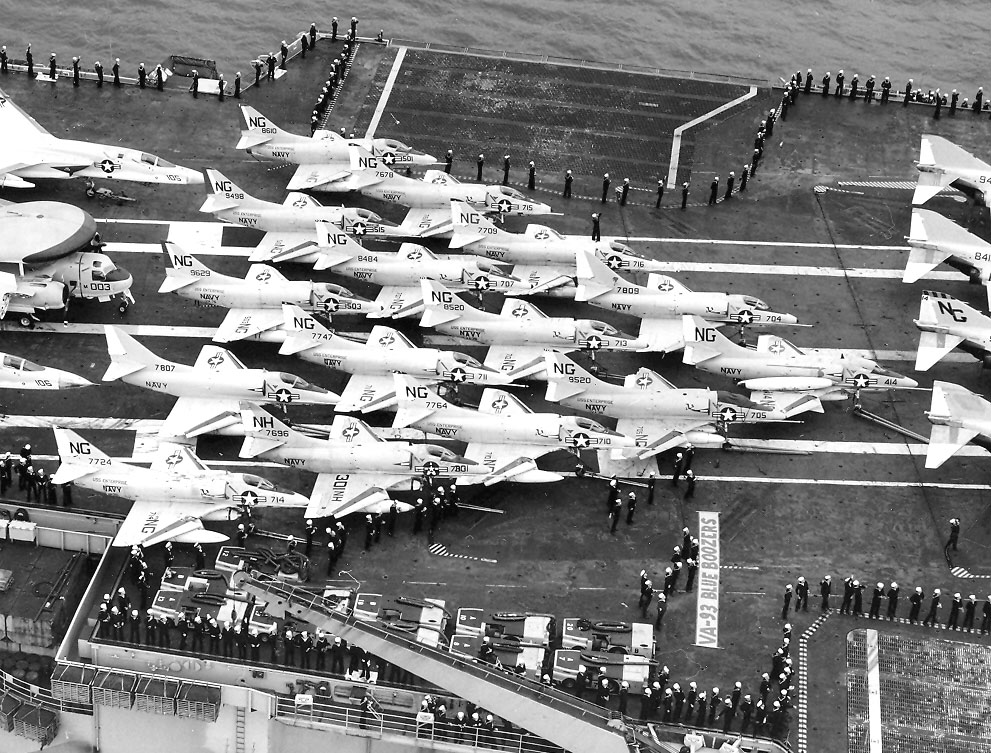
VA-93 A-4s on the USS Enterprise in June 1966

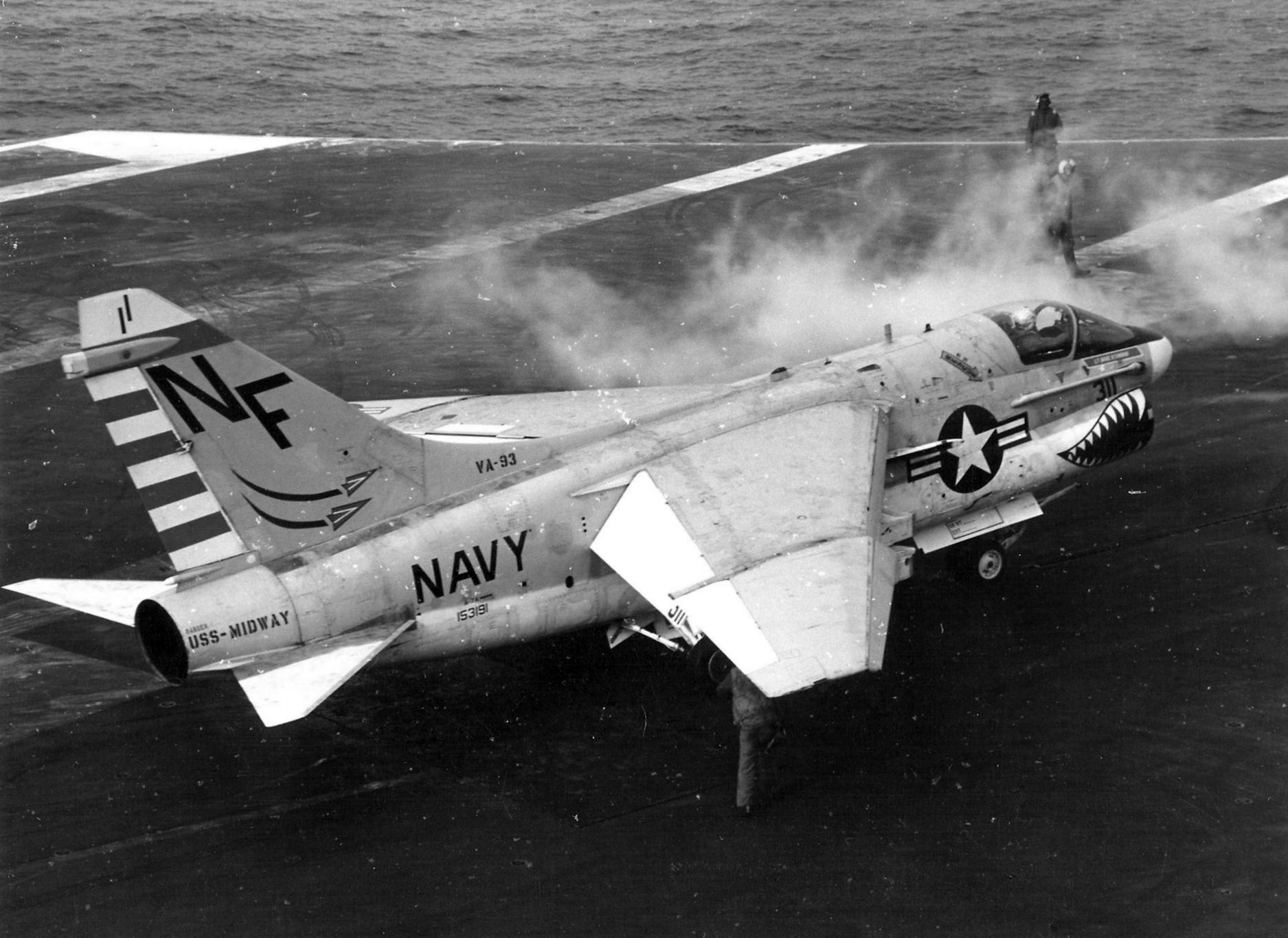
VA-93 A-7A on USS Midway c.1970

VA-93 was an Attack Squadron of the U.S. Navy. It was established as Fighter Squadron VF-93 on 26 March 1952, and redesignated as VA-93 on 15 September 1956. It was disestablished 30 years later on 31 August 1986. The squadron's nickname was the Blue Blazers from 1954 to 1976 and the Ravens thereafter.

== History ==
- May 1963: Following the military losses of the Lao neutralist to the Pathet Lao in the Plaine de Jarres, Laos, USS Ranger (CV-61) transited to the South China Sea to support possible operations in Laos.
- 15 Oct 1963: The squadron established a Detachment Q for deployment aboard the anti-submarine carrier USS Bennington (CVS-20) to provide daylight fighter protection for the ASW aircraft. The detachment flew A-4B Skyhawks.
- 7 Feb 1965: Following a Viet Cong attack against the American advisors compound at Pleiku, South Vietnam, a reprisal strike, named Operation Flaming Dart, was ordered by President Johnson. VA-93 participated in this strike, but upon reaching the target, the military barracks at Vit Thu Lu, the mission was aborted due to the weather.
- 11 Feb 1965: Participated in Operation Flaming Dart II, retaliatory strikes against the military barracks at Chanh Hoa, North Vietnam.
- 15 Mar 1965: Participated in Operation Rolling Thunder strikes against ammunition storage area in Phu Qui, North Vietnam.
- May–Oct 1972: Participated in Operation Linebacker, heavy air strikes against targets in North Vietnam to reduce that country’s ability to continue the war effort in South Vietnam.
- Apr 1975: Participated in Operation Frequent Wind, the evacuation of American personnel from Saigon, South Vietnam as the country fell to the communists.
- Aug–Sep 1976: Operated near the Korea Peninsula following the Axe murder incident.
- Nov–Dec 1979: In response to the seizure of the American Embassy and its staff, and the Soviet invasion of Afghanistan, USS Midway (CV-41) operated in the Arabian Sea.
- May–Jun 1980: Following the Kwangju Massacre in South Korea, Midway operated off the coast of South Korea until the crisis had subsided.
- Dec 1981: Following unrest in Korea, Midway operated off the coast of South Korea for several days.

== Home port assignments ==
The squadron was assigned to these home ports, effective on the dates shown:

- NAS Alameda – 26 Mar 1952
- NAS Lemoore – 08 Mar 1962
- NS Yokosuka (NAF Atsugi & NAF Misawa) 05 Oct 1973*
- NAS Lemoore 16 Apr 1986

* VA-93, along with CVW-5 and USS Midway (CVA-41), were part of a program to permanently assign a carrier and air wing to an overseas home port. Midway's new home port was NS Yokosuka, Japan, and the squadron would normally operate out of NAF Atsugi or NAF Misawa when the carrier was at NS Yokosuka. The assignment was effective 30 June 1973. However, the squadron did not arrive until 5 October 1973.

== Aircraft assignment ==
The squadron first received the following aircraft on the dates shown:

- FG-1D Corsair – May 1952
- F9F-2 Panther – May 1952
- F9F-5 Panther – Sep 1953
- F9F-8 Cougar – Jan 1955
- A4D-1 Skyhawk – 26 Nov 1956
- A4D-2 Skyhawk – 25 May 1958
- A4D-2N Skyhawk – 01 Sep 1960
- A-4B Skyhawk – 15 Oct 1963
- A-4E Skyhawk – Sep 1966
- A-4F Skyhawk – Sep 1967
- A-7B Corsair II – 20 Apr 1969
- A-7A Corsair II – Mar 1973
- A-7E Corsair II – Apr 1977

== See also ==
- Attack aircraft
- List of inactive United States Navy aircraft squadrons
- History of the United States Navy
