= Second VA-215 (U.S. Navy) =

Attack Squadron 215
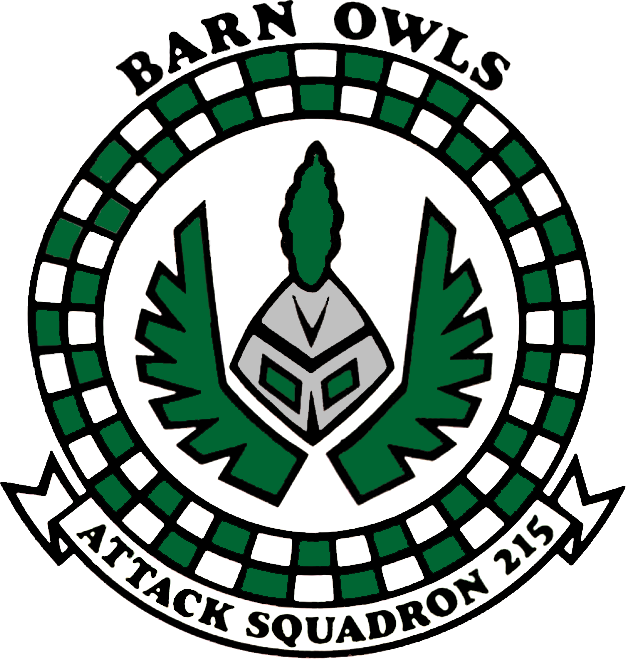
- Active: 1 March 1968 – 30 September 1977
- Country: United States
- Branch: United States Navy
- Role: Attack aircraft
- Part of: Inactive
- Nickname(s): Barn Owls
- Engagements: Vietnam War

Aircraft flown
- Attack: A-7B Corsair II

Attack Squadron 215 or VA-215, nicknamed the Barn Owls, was an Attack Squadron of the United States Navy. It was established on 1 March 1968 and disestablished on 30 September 1977. The squadron, based at NAS Lemoore, flew the A-7B Corsair II. It was the second squadron to be designated as VA-215, the first VA-215 was disestablished on 31 August 1967 and had originated the Barn Owls nickname.

== Operational history ==
- 1 March 1968: Following its establishment, the squadron remained under the operational control of VA-122 during its training in the A-7 Corsair II.
- 14 January 1969: The squadron was embarked on USS Enterprise, conducting operational training in Hawaiian waters prior to deployment when a major fire occurred on the flight deck of the carrier. Several squadron personnel were presented with citations from the Secretary of the Navy and the Commanding Officer of Enterprise for heroism during the fire.
- 16 April 1969: Enterprise, with VA-215 embarked, departed Yankee Station en route to Korean waters in response to the downing of a Navy EC-121 aircraft by the North Koreans on 15 April. The squadron operated in the Sea of Japan and the Yellow Sea until 11 May.
- 2 January 1970: The squadron set sail on the USS Franklin D. Roosevelt From Mayport, Florida. This was the ships 18th Mediterranean cruise, returning on 27 July 1970.

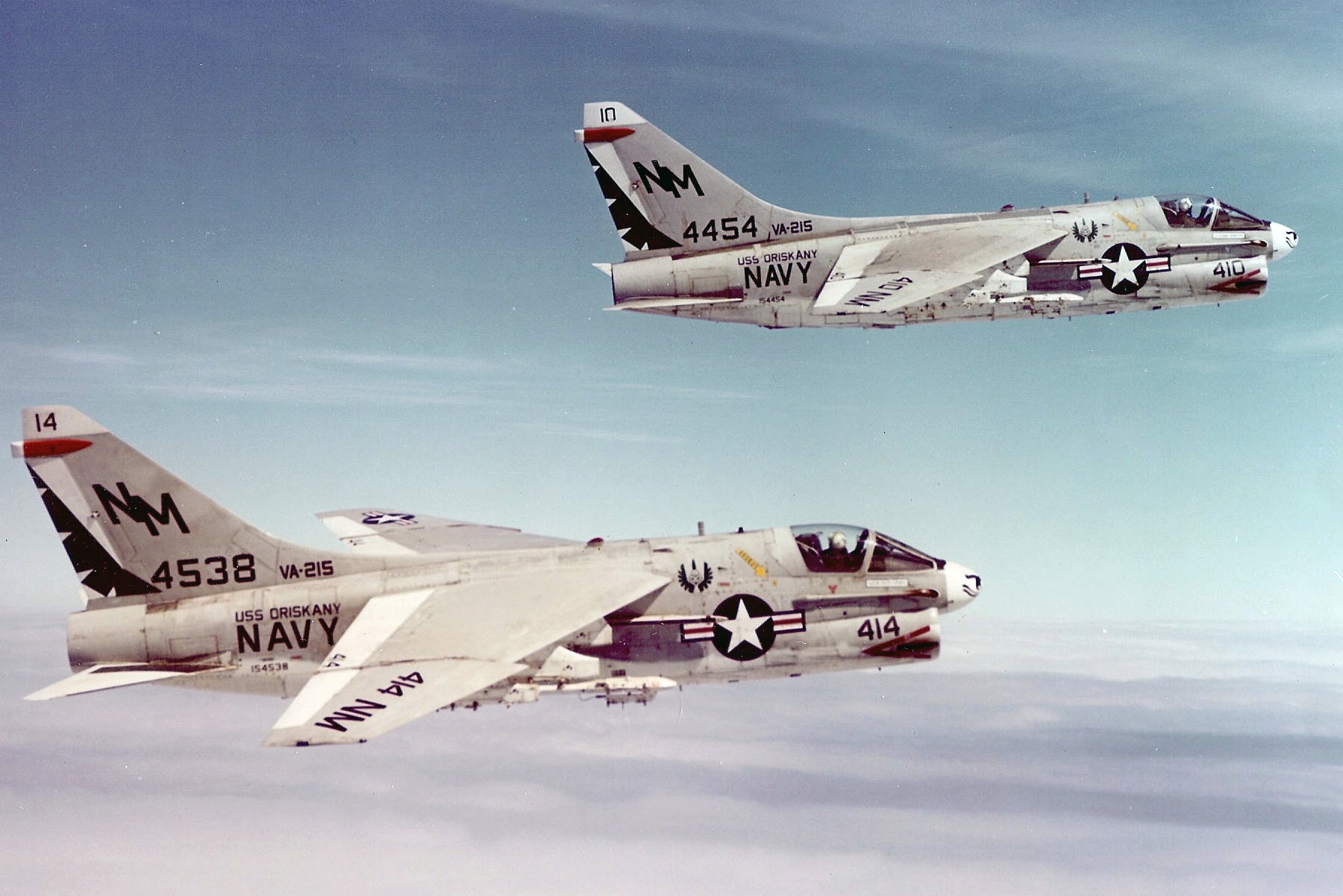
VA-215 A-7B Corsair IIs over Vietnam, 1971. Note that the guns of both aircraft have been fired.

- December 1972: The squadron participated in Operation Linebacker II, concentrated air strikes against North Vietnam.
- February 1973: Following the ceasefire with North Vietnam, the squadron flew combat missions in Laos until a ceasefire was signed with that country on 22 February 1973.
- November 1973: USS Oriskany, with VA-215 embarked, departed from operations in the South China Sea to relieve the USS Hancock on station in the Arabian Sea due to the unsettled conditions following the Yom Kippur War.
- October 1976 – April 1977: USS Franklin D. Roosevelt, CVW-19 and VA-215 made their last operational cruise.

== See also ==
- Attack aircraft
- List of inactive United States Navy aircraft squadrons
- History of the United States Navy
