= USS Hancock (CV-19) =

Essex-class aircraft carrier of the US Navy

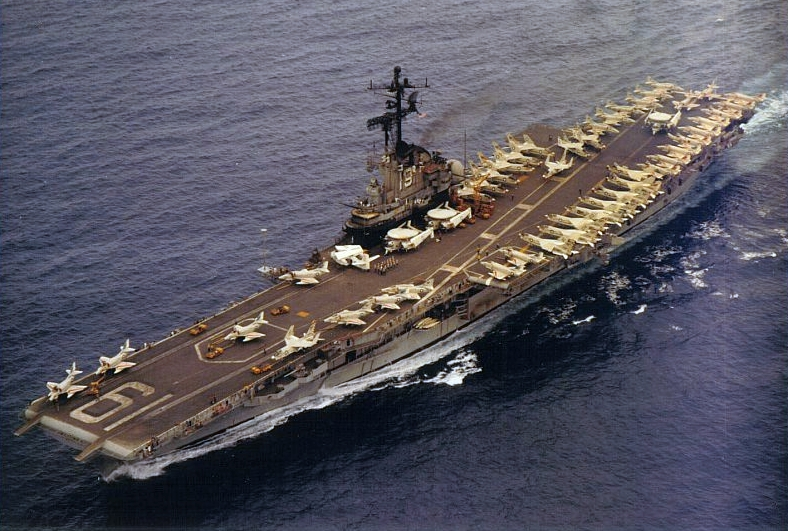
- USS Hancock off Pearl Harbor, 1968

History

United States
- Name: Hancock
- Namesake: John Hancock
- Builder: Fore River Shipyard
- Laid down: 26 January 1943
- Launched: 24 January 1944
- Commissioned: 15 April 1944
- Decommissioned: 9 May 1947
- Recommissioned: 15 February 1954
- Decommissioned: 30 January 1976
- Reclassified: CVA-19, 1 October 1952
- Stricken: 31 January 1976
- Fate: Scrapped, 1 September 1976

General characteristics
- Class & type: Essex-class aircraft carrier
- Displacement: 27,100 long tons (27,500 t) standard
- Length: 888 feet (271 m) overall
- Beam: 93 feet (28 m)
- Draft: 28 feet 7 inches (8.71 m)
- Installed power: 8 × boilers; 150,000 shp (110 MW)
- Propulsion: 4 × geared steam turbines; 4 × shafts
- Speed: 33 knots (61 km/h; 38 mph)
- Complement: 3448 officers and enlisted
- Armament: 12 × 5 inch (127 mm)/38 caliber guns; 32 × Bofors 40 mm guns; 46 × Oerlikon 20 mm cannons
- Armor: Belt: 4 in (102 mm); Hangar deck: 2.5 in (64 mm); Deck: 1.5 in (38 mm); Conning tower: 1.5 inch
- Aircraft carried: 90–100 aircraft

USS Hancock (CV/CVA-19) was one of 24 Essex-class aircraft carriers built during World War II for the United States Navy. Hancock was the fourth US Navy ship to bear the namesake of Founding Father John Hancock, president of the Second Continental Congress and first governor of the Commonwealth of Massachusetts. (Note: There is some controversy regarding the naming of fleet carriers after famous Americans. Some suggest that the carrier was named for the frigate Hancock of the Continental Navy and that no US fleet carrier was named directly for a person before Franklin D. Roosevelt. The other examples are Franklin was named for Benjamin Franklin and was the fifth ship to bear the name, and Randolph was named for Peyton Randolph, President of the First Continental Congress.) Hancock was commissioned in April 1944 and served in several campaigns in the Pacific Theater of Operations, earning four battle stars. Decommissioned shortly after the end of the war, she was modernized and recommissioned in the early 1950s as an attack carrier (CVA). In her second career, she operated exclusively in the Pacific, playing a prominent role in the Vietnam War, for which she earned a Navy Unit Commendation. She was the first US Navy carrier to have steam catapults installed. She was decommissioned in early 1976 and sold for scrap later that year.

== Construction and commissioning ==
The ship was laid down as Ticonderoga on 26 January 1943 by Bethlehem Steel Co., Quincy, Massachusetts and subsequently renamed Hancock on 1 May 1943. This renaming was done in response to an offer from the John Hancock Life Insurance Company to conduct a special bond drive to raise money for the ship if that name was used. (The shipyard at Quincy was in the company's home state.) CV-14, originally laid down as Hancock and under construction at the same time in Newport News, Virginia, took the name Ticonderoga instead.

The company's bond drive raised enough money to both build the ship and operate her for the first year. The ship was launched 24 January 1944 by Juanita Gabriel-Ramsey, the wife of Rear Admiral DeWitt Clinton Ramsey, Chief of the Bureau of Aeronautics. Hancock was commissioned 15 April 1944, with Captain Fred C. Dickey in command.

== Service history ==
=== World War II ===
After fitting out in the Boston Navy Yard and shake-down training off Trinidad and Venezuela, Hancock returned to Boston for alterations on 9 July 1944. She departed Boston on 31 July en route to Pearl Harbor via the Panama Canal and San Diego, and from there sailed on 24 September to join Admiral W. F. Halsey's 3rd Fleet at Ulithi on 5 October. She was assigned to Rear Admiral Gerald F. Bogan's Carrier Task Group 38.2 (TG 38.2).

The following afternoon, Hancock sailed for a rendezvous point 375 nmi (690 km) west of the Marianas where units of Vice Admiral Mitscher's Fast Carrier Task Force 38 (TF 38) were to raid Japanese air and sea bases in the Ryūkyūs, Formosa, (Note: Formosa was the name of the main the island of Taiwan in western literature until the 20th century.) and the Philippines, to limit Japanese air power during the invasion of Leyte.

==== Philippines campaign ====
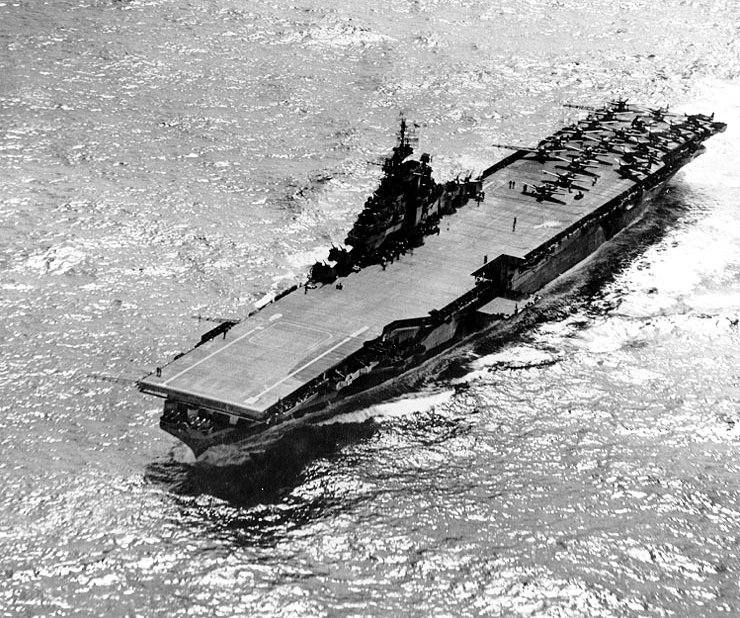
Hancock off the Philippines, December 1944

The armada arrived off the Ryukyu Islands on 10 October 1944, with Hancock's aircraft claiming seven enemy aircraft destroyed on the ground and assisting in the sinking of a submarine tender, 12 torpedo boats, 2 midget submarines, 4 cargo ships, and a number of sampans.

Formosan air bases were targeted on 12 October. Hancock's pilots claimed six Japanese aircraft and nine more on the ground. She also reported one cargo ship sunk, three probably destroyed, and several others damaged.

During an enemy air raid that evening, Hancock's gunners accounted for a Japanese aircraft during seven hours of uninterrupted general quarters. The following morning her aircraft resumed their assault, knocking out ammunition dumps, hangars, barracks, industrial plants ashore and damaging an enemy transport. As Japanese aircraft again attacked the Americans during their second night off Formosa, Hancock's antiaircraft fire claimed another raider which crashed about 500 yd (460 m) off her flight deck.

As the American ships withdrew a large force of Japanese aircraft approached the American fleet. One dropped a bomb off Hancock's port bow a few seconds before being hit by the carrier's guns and crashing into the sea. Another bomb penetrated a gun platform but exploded in the water. The task force sailed toward the Philippines to support the landings at Leyte.

On 18 October, she launched aircraft against airfields and shipping at Laoag, Aparri, and Camiguin Island in Northern Luzon. Her aircraft struck the islands of Cebu, Panay, Negros, and Masbate, airfields and shipping. The next day, she retired toward Ulithi with Vice Admiral John S. McCain, Sr.'s TG 38.1.

She received orders on 23 October to turn back to the area off Samar to assist in the search for units of the Japanese fleet reportedly closing Leyte to challenge the American fleet, and to destroy amphibious forces which were struggling to take the island. Hancock did not reach Samar in time to assist the escort carriers and destroyers of "Taffy 3" during the main action of the Battle off Samar, but her aircraft did manage to attack the retreating Japanese Center Force as it passed through the San Bernardino Strait. Hancock then rejoined Rear Admiral Bogan's Task Group with which she struck airfields and shipping in the vicinity of Manila on 29 October 1944. During operations through 19 November, her aircraft gave support to advancing Army troops and attacked Japanese shipping over a 350 mi (560 km) area. She became flagship of the Fast Carrier Task Force (TF 38) on 17 November 1944 when Admiral McCain came on board.

Unfavorable weather prevented operations until 25 November, when a kamikaze targeted Hancock, diving out of the sun. Antiaircraft fire destroyed the aircraft some 300 ft (90 m) above the ship, but a section of its fuselage landed amidships, and a part of the wing hit the flight deck and burst into flames. The fire was extinguished without major damage.

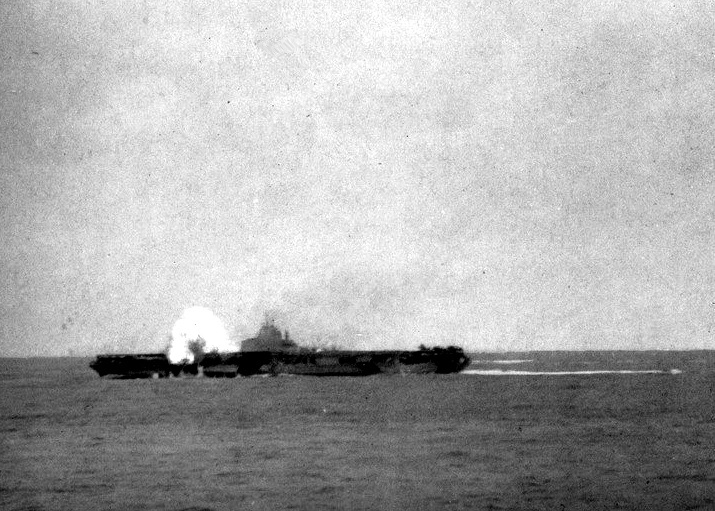
Hancock being hit by a kamikaze

Hancock returned to Ulithi on 27 November and departed from that island with her task group to maintain air patrol over enemy airfields on Luzon to prevent kamikaze attacking amphibious vessels of the landing force in Mindoro. The first strikes were launched on 14 December against Clark and Angeles City Airfields as well as enemy ground targets on Salvador Island. The next day her aircraft attacked installations at Masinloc, San Fernando, and Cabanatuan, while fighter patrols limited Japanese attacks. Her aircraft also attacked shipping in Manila Bay.

Hancock encountered Typhoon Cobra on 17 December 1944, in waves which broke over her flight deck, some 55 ft (20 m) above her waterline. She put into Ulithi 24 December and got underway six days later to attack airfields and shipping around the South China Sea. Her aircraft struck at Luzon airfields on 7–8 January 1945 and turned their attention back to Formosa on 9 January, hitting airfields and the Toko Seaplane Station. An enemy convoy north of Camranh Bay, Indochina was the next target, with two ships sunk and 11 damaged. That afternoon Hancock launched strikes against airfields at Saigon and shipping on the northeastern bulge of French Indochina. Strikes by the fast and mobile carrier force continued through 16 January, hitting Hainan Island in the Gulf of Tonkin, the Pescadores Islands, and shipping in the harbor of Hong Kong. Raids against Formosa were resumed on 20 January. The next afternoon one of her aircraft returning from a sortie made a normal landing, taxied to a point abreast of the island before disintegrating in an explosion which killed 50 men and injured 75 others. Damage control work brought the fires under control in time to land the other aircraft of the same flight. She returned to formation and launched strikes against Okinawa the next morning. Hancock reached Ulithi on 25 January, where Admiral McCain left the ship and relinquished command of TF 38, which became TF 58 under Mitscher.

==== Iwo Jima and Okinawa ====
She sortied with the ships of her task group on 10 February and launched strikes against airfields in the vicinity of Tokyo on 16 February. On that day, her air group, Air Group 80, claimed 71 enemy aircraft and 12 more the following day. Her aircraft attacked enemy naval bases at Chichi Jima and Haha Jima on 19 February, as part of a raid to isolate Iwo Jima from air and sea support during American landing. Hancock took station off this island to provide tactical support through 22 February, attacking enemy airfields and strafing Japanese troops ashore.

Returning to waters off the Japanese home islands, Hancock launched her aircraft against targets on northern Honshū, making a diversionary raid on the Nansei-shoto islands on 1 March before returning to Ulithi on 4 March 1945.

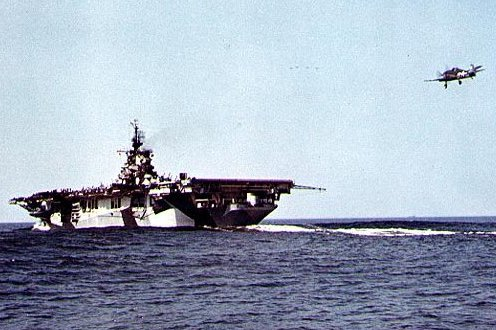
1944 color photo of a Grumman F6F Hellcat landing

Back in Japanese waters, Hancock joined other carriers in strikes against Kyūshū airfields, southwestern Honshū and shipping in the Inland Sea of Japan on 18 March. Hancock was refueling the destroyer Halsey Powell on 20 March when kamikazes attacked the task force. One aircraft dove for the two ships but was destroyed by gunfire when about 700 ft (210 m) overhead. Fragments of the aircraft hit Hancock's deck while its engine and bomb crashed the fantail of the destroyer. Hancock's gunners shot down another aircraft as it neared the release point of its bombing run on the carrier.

Hancock was reassigned to Carrier TG 58.3 with which she struck the Nansei-shoto islands from 23 to 27 March and Minami Daito Island and Kyūshū at the end of the month.

Hancock provided close air support for the landing of the US 10th Army on the western coast of Okinawa on 1 April,. On 7 April a kamikaze struck her flight deck and hitting a group of aircraft while its bomb hit the port catapult; 62 men were killed and a further 71 wounded but the fires were put out within half an hour and she was back in action inside an hour.

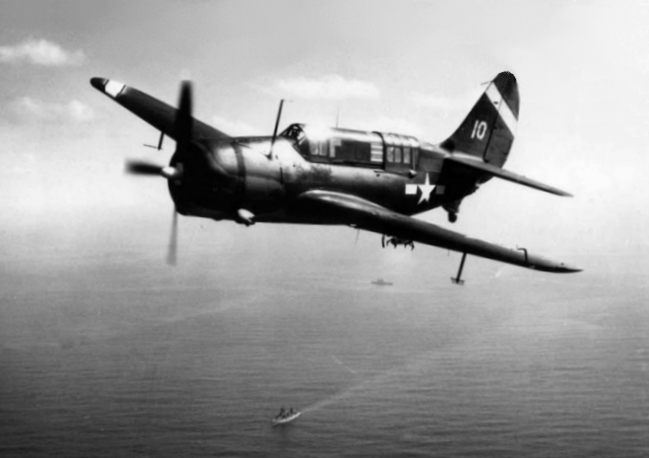
Curtiss SB2C-3 Helldiver from Hancock off Iwo Jima

Hancock was detached from her task group on 9 April and steamed to Pearl Harbor for repairs. She sailed back into action 13 June and attacked Wake Island on 20 June en route to the Philippines. Hancock sailed from San Pedro Bay with the other carriers on 1 July and attacked Tokyo airfields on 10 July. She continued to operate in Japanese waters until she received confirmation of Japan's capitulation on 15 August 1945 when she recalled her aircraft from their missions before they reached their targets. However aircraft of her photo division were attacked by seven enemy aircraft over Sagami Wan. Three were claimed shot down and a fourth damaged. Later that afternoon aircraft of Hancock's air patrol shot down a Japanese torpedo plane as it dived on a British task force. Her aircraft flew missions over Japan in search of prison camps, dropping supplies and medicine, on 25 August. Information collected during these flights led to landings under command of Commodore R. W. Simpson which brought doctors and supplies to all Allied prisoner of war encampments.

==== End of the war ====
When the formal surrender of the Japanese government was signed on board battleship Missouri, Hancock's aircraft flew overhead. The carrier entered Tokyo Bay on 10 September 1945 and sailed on 30 September embarking 1,500 passengers at Okinawa for transportation to San Pedro, California, where she arrived on 21 October. Hancock was fitted out for Operation Magic Carpet duty at San Pedro and sailed for Seeadler Harbor, Manus, Admiralty Islands on 2 November. On her return voyage, she carried 4,000 passengers who were debarked at San Diego on 4 December. A week later Hancock departed for her second Magic Carpet voyage, embarking 3,773 passengers at Manila for return to Alameda, California, on 20 January 1946. She embarked Air Group 7 at San Diego on 18 February for air operations off the coast of California. She sailed from San Diego on 11 March to embark men of two air groups and aircraft at Pearl Harbor for transportation to Saipan, arriving on 1 April. After receiving two other air groups on board at Saipan, she loaded a cargo of aircraft at Guam and steamed by way of Pearl Harbor to Alameda, arriving on 23 April. She then steamed to Seattle, Washington, on 29 April to await inactivation. The ship was decommissioned and entered the reserve fleet at Bremerton, Washington.

=== Postwar career ===
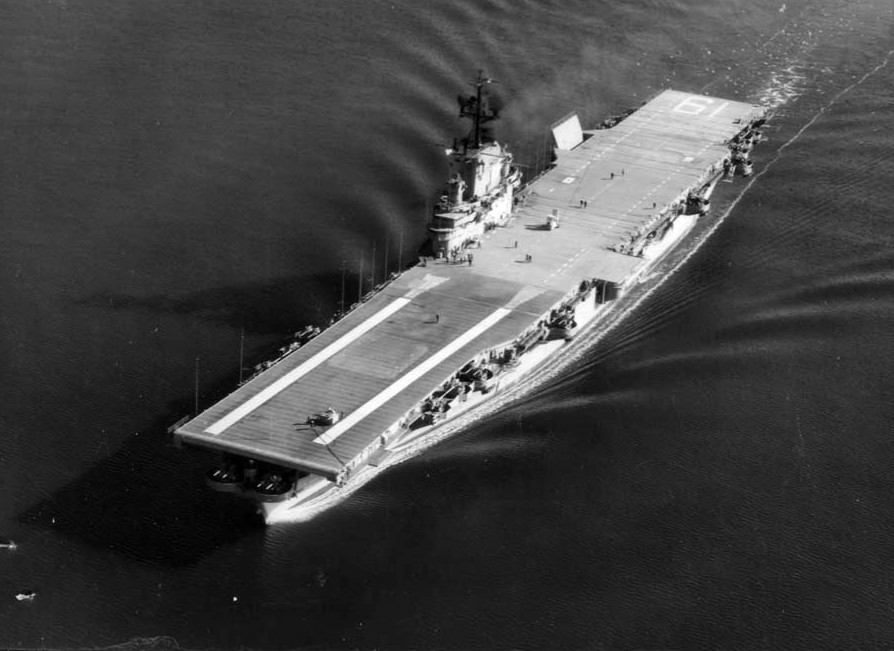
Hancock after completion of the SCB-27C modernization, 1954

Hancock commenced the SCB-27C conversion and modernization to an attack aircraft carrier in Puget Sound 15 December 1951 and was reclassified CVA-19 on 1 October 1952. She recommissioned on 15 February 1954, Captain W. S. Butts in command. She was the first carrier of the United States Fleet with steam catapults capable of launching high-performance jets. The modernization cost $60 million ($719 million today). She was off San Diego on 7 May 1954 for operations along the coast of California that included 17 June launching of the first aircraft to take off a United States carrier by means of a steam catapult. After a year of operations along the Pacific coast that included testing of Sparrow I and Regulus missiles and Cutlass jet aircraft, she sailed on 10 August 1955 for 7th Fleet operations ranging from the shores of Japan to the Philippines and Okinawa.

She returned to San Diego on 15 March 1956 and decommissioned on 13 April for her SCB-125 conversion that included the installation of an angled flight deck. Hancock recommissioned on 15 November 1956 for training out of San Diego until 6 April 1957, when she again sailed for Hawaii and the Far East. She returned to San Diego on 18 September 1957 and again departed for Japan on 15 February 1958. She was a unit of powerful carrier task groups taking station off Taiwan when the Nationalist Chinese islands of Quemoy and Matsu were threatened with Communist invasion in August 1958. The carrier returned to San Francisco on 2 October for overhaul in the San Francisco Naval Shipyard, followed by rigorous at-sea training out of San Francisco. On 1 August 1959, she sailed to reinforce the 7th Fleet as troubles in Laos demanded the watchful presence of powerful American forces in water off southeast Asia. She returned to San Francisco on 18 January 1960 and put to sea early in February to participate in the Communication Moon Relay project, a new demonstration of communications by reflecting ultra-high frequency waves off the moon. She again departed in August to steam with the 7th Fleet in waters off Laos until lessening of tension in that area permitted operations ranging from Japan to the Philippines.

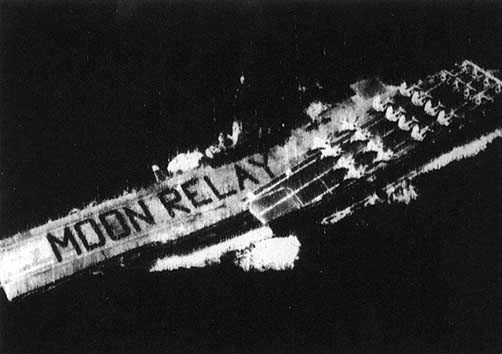
Photo of Hancock on a facsimile transmitted from Honolulu to Washington D.C. via the moon in 1960

Hancock returned to San Francisco in March 1961, then entered the Puget Sound Naval Shipyard for an overhaul that gave her new electronics gear and many other improvements. She again set sail for Far Eastern waters on 2 February 1962, patrolling in the South China Sea as crisis and strife mounted both in Laos and in South Vietnam. She again appeared off Quemoy and Matsu in June to stem a threatened Communist invasion there, then trained along the coast of Japan and in waters reaching to Okinawa. She returned to San Francisco on 7 October, made a brief cruise to the coast of Hawaii while qualifying pilots then again sailed on 7 June 1963 for the Far East.

Hancock joined in combined defense exercises along the coast of South Korea, then deployed off the coast of South Vietnam after the coup which resulted in the death of President Diem. She entered the Hunter's Point Naval Shipyard on 16 January 1964 for modernization that included installation of a new ordnance system, hull repairs, and aluminum decking for her flight deck. She celebrated her 20th birthday on 2 June while visiting San Diego. The carrier made a training cruise to Hawaii, then departed Alameda on 21 October for another tour of duty with the 7th Fleet in the Far East.

=== Vietnam War ===
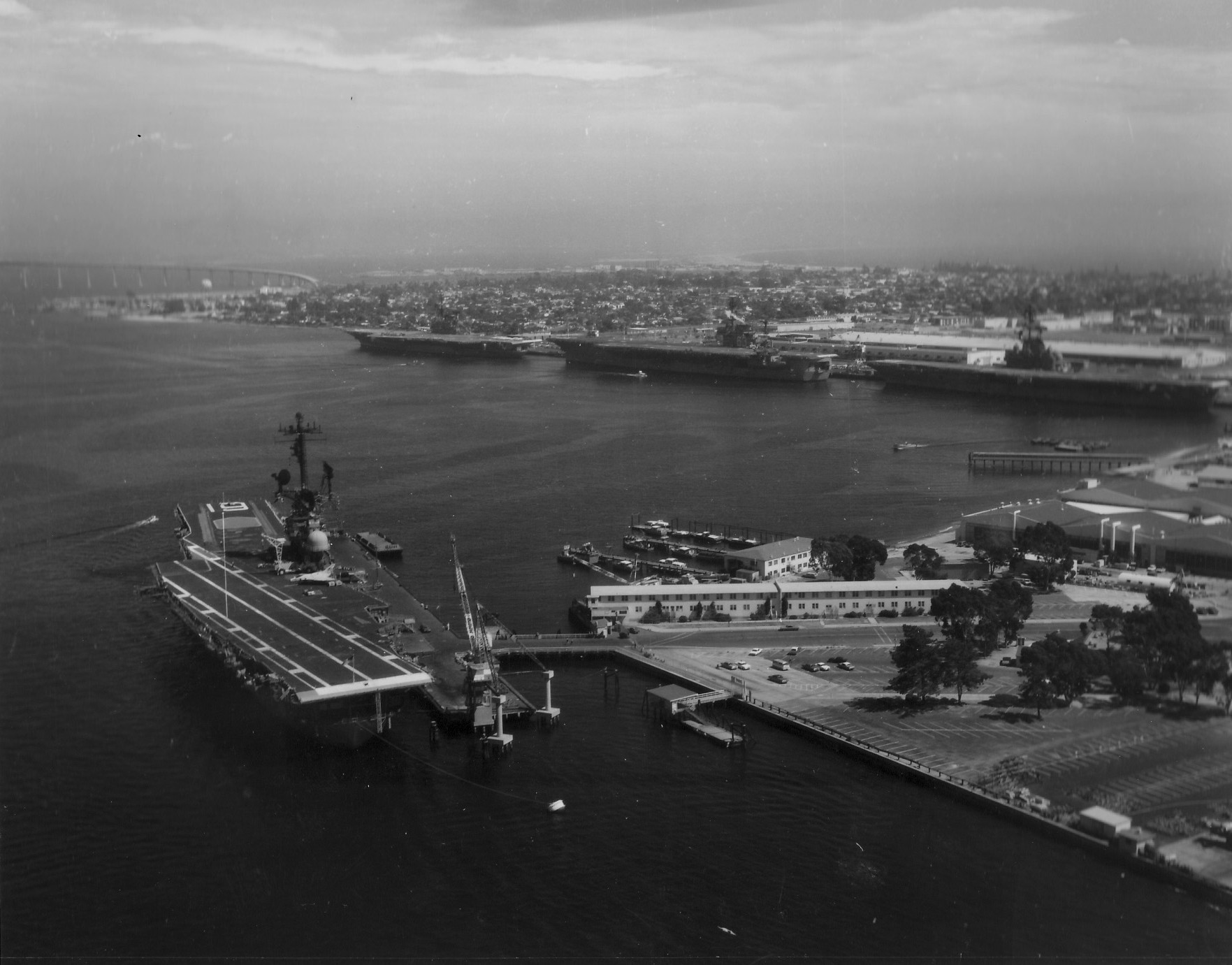
Hancock at San Diego in 1970; moored behind are (l-r) Midway, Kitty Hawk and Ticonderoga

Hancock reached Japan on 19 November and soon was on patrol at Yankee Station in the Gulf of Tonkin. She remained active in Vietnamese waters until heading for home early in the spring of 1965. November found the carrier steaming back to the war zone. She was on patrol off Vietnam on 16 December; and, but for brief respites at Hong Kong, the Philippines, or Japan, Hancock remained on station launching her planes for strikes at enemy positions ashore until returning to Alameda on 1 August 1966. Her outstanding record during this combat tour won her the Navy Unit Commendation.

Following operations off the West Coast, Hancock returned to Vietnam early in 1967 and resumed her strikes against Communist positions. After fighting during most of the first half of 1967, she returned to Alameda on 22 July and promptly began preparations for returning to battle.

In the summer of 1969, she was back in Alameda preparing for yet another deployment to southeast Asia. In July, while in pre-deployment night landing exercises, an F-8 came in too low and crashed into the round-down splitting the aircraft into two pieces which hurtled down the deck and erupted in a massive fuel-fed fire. While there were no deaths, damage to the flight deck was extensive, resulting in a frenetic 24 × 7 repair effort to be ready by the deployment date.

Aircraft from Hancock, along with those from USS Ranger and USS Oriskany, joined with other planes for air strikes against North Vietnamese missile and antiaircraft sites south of the 19th parallel in response to attacks on unarmed U.S. reconnaissance aircraft on 21–22 November 1970 (Operation Freedom Bait). Hancock alternated with Ranger and Kitty Hawk on Yankee Station until 10 May 1971, when she was relieved by Midway.

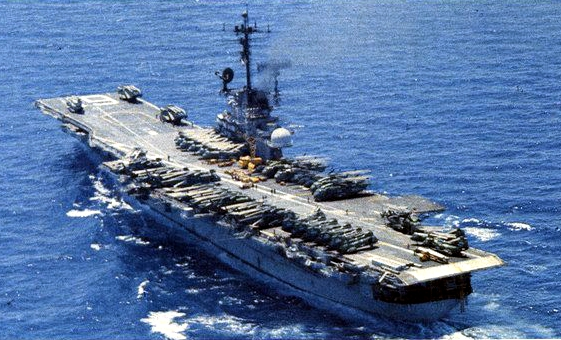
Hancock as an ad hoc helicopter carrier off Vietnam, April 1975

Hancock, along with USS Coral Sea, was back on Yankee Station by 30 March 1972 when North Vietnam invaded South Vietnam. In response to the invasion, Naval aircraft from Hancock and other carriers flew tactical sorties during Operation Freedom Train against military and logistics targets in the southern part of North Vietnam. By the end of April, the strikes covered more areas in North Vietnam throughout the area below 20°25′ N. From 25 to 30 April 1972, aircraft from Hancock's VA-55, VA-164, VF-211 and VA-212 struck enemy-held territory around Kontum and Pleiku.

On 17 March 1975 Hancock was ordered to offload her air wing. On arrival at Subic Bay, she offloaded CAG 21. On 26 March, Marine Heavy Lift Helicopter Squadron HMH-463 comprising 25 CH-53, CH-46, AH-1J and UH-1E helicopters embarked on Hancock and then proceeded to Subic Bay to offload the other half of CAG 21. After taking on more helicopters at Subic Bay, Hancock was temporarily assigned to Amphibious Ready Group Bravo, standing by off Vung Tau, South Vietnam, but on 11 April she joined Amphibious Ready Group Alpha in the Gulf of Thailand. Hancock then took part in Operation Eagle Pull, the evacuation of Phnom Penh on 12 April 1975 and Operation Frequent Wind, the evacuation of Saigon on 29–30 April 1975. From 12 to 14 May, she was alerted, although not utilized, for the recovery of SS Mayagüez, a US merchantman with 39 crew, seized in international waters on 12 May by the Communist Khmer Rouge.

=== Decommissioning ===
Hancock was decommissioned on 30 January 1976. She was stricken from the Navy list the following day, (Note: But the Naval Vessel Register says a month earlier; "Hancock (CV 19)". NVR. NAVSEA Shipbuilding Support Office (NAVSHIPSO). 28 December 2001.) and sold for scrap by the Defense Reutilization and Marketing Service (DRMS) on 1 September 1976. By January 1977, ex-Hancock was being scrapped in Los Angeles harbor and artifacts were being sold to former crew members and the general public, including items ranging from portholes to the anchor chain. The Associated Press noted that some of the scrap metal from the World War II-serving aircraft carrier would be sold to Japan to manufacture automobiles.

== Awards ==

Hancock was awarded the Navy Unit Commendation and received four battle stars on the Asiatic–Pacific Campaign Medal for service in World War II. She also earned 13 battle stars for service in Vietnam.

According to the US Navy Unit Awards website, Hancock and her crew received the following awards, in approximately chronological order:

- Navy Unit Commendation for seven different time periods in World War II
- Armed Forces Expeditionary Medal for Taiwan Straits from 26 August 1958 to 7 September 1958
- Armed Forces Expeditionary Medal for Quemoy-Matsu from 14 September 1959 to 17 September 1959
- Armed Forces Expeditionary Medal for Vietnam for five time periods that fell between 1 July 58 and 3 July 65
- Armed Forces Expeditionary Medal for Korea for four time periods between 1 October 66 and 3 June 74
- Navy Unit Commendation for service 6 December 1965 to 25 July 1966
- Navy Unit Commendation for service 1 August 1968 to 22 February 1969
- Meritorious Unit Commendation for service from 21 August 1969 to 31 March 1970
- Meritorious Unit Commendation for service from 20 November 1970 to 7 May 1971
- Navy Unit Commendation for service from 8 February 1972 to 14 September 1972
- Vietnam Service Medal and Republic of Vietnam Meritorious Unit Citation for numerous time periods during the Vietnam war
- Operation Eagle Pull - 12 April 1975
  - Armed Forces Expeditionary Medal
  - Humanitarian Service Medal
  - Meritorious Unit Commendation
- Operation Frequent Wind - 29 to 30 April 1975
  - Armed Forces Expeditionary Medal
  - Humanitarian Service Medal
  - Navy Unit Commendation

Hancock was also awarded:

- American Campaign Medal
- World War II Victory Medal
- Navy Occupation Medal
- National Defense Service Medal (2nd)
- Sea Service Ribbon

== Gallery ==
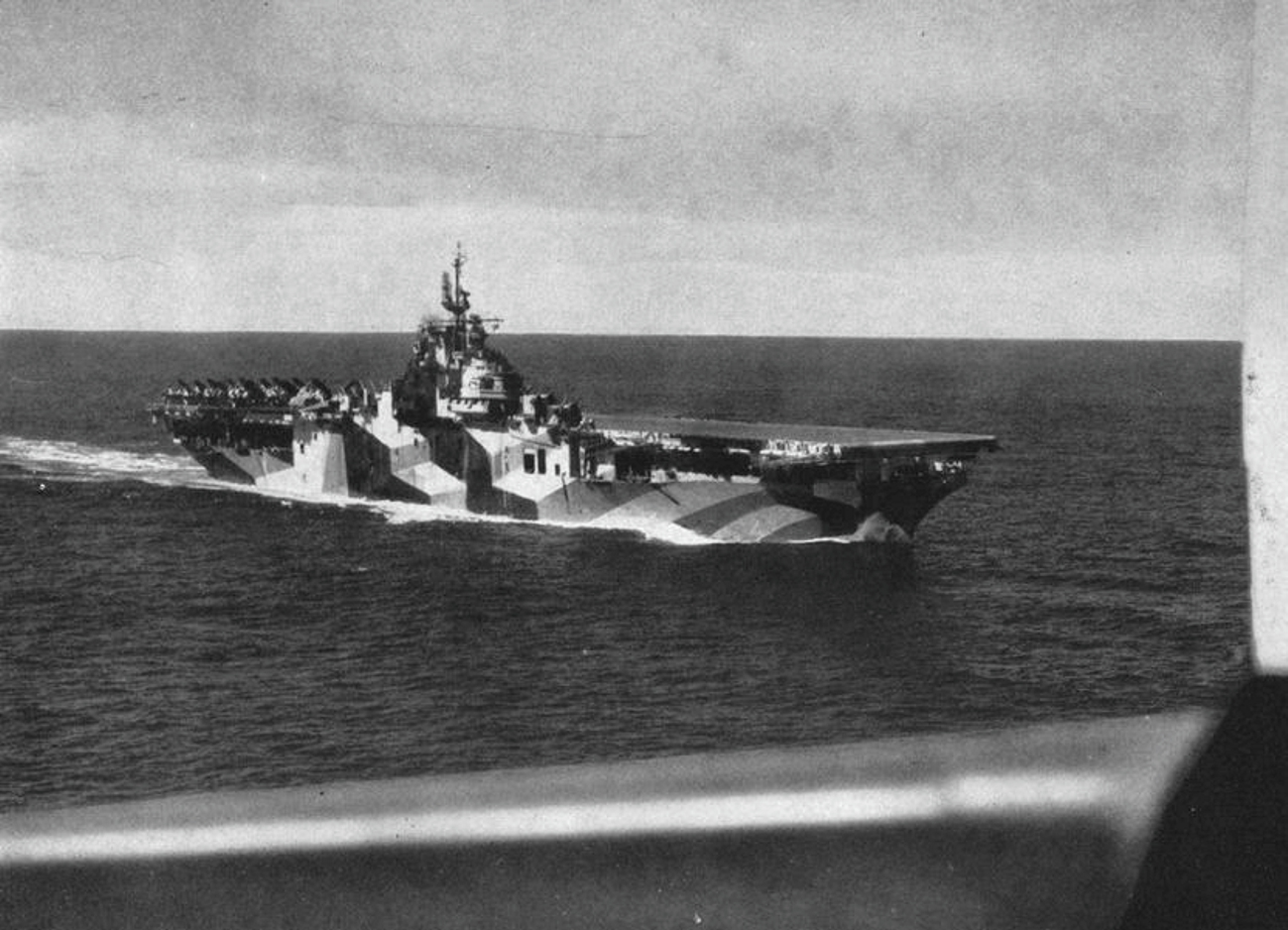
Hancock in dazzle camouflage 1944

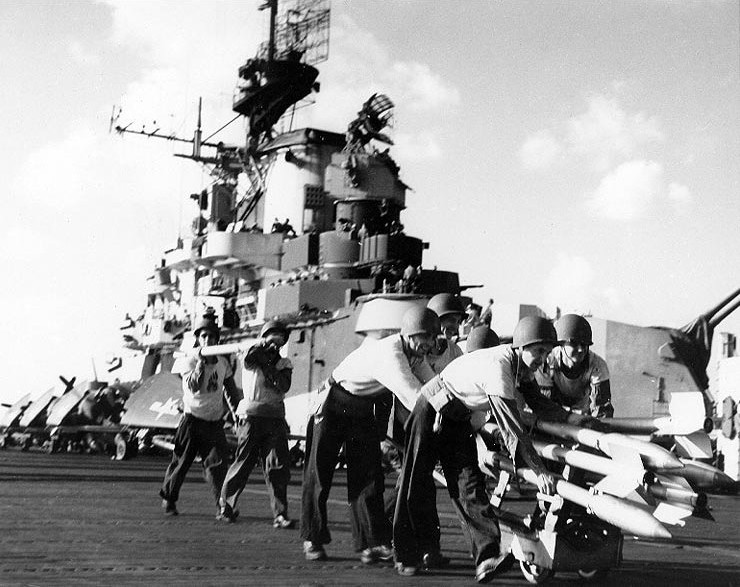
Moving rockets aboard Hancock on 12 October 1944

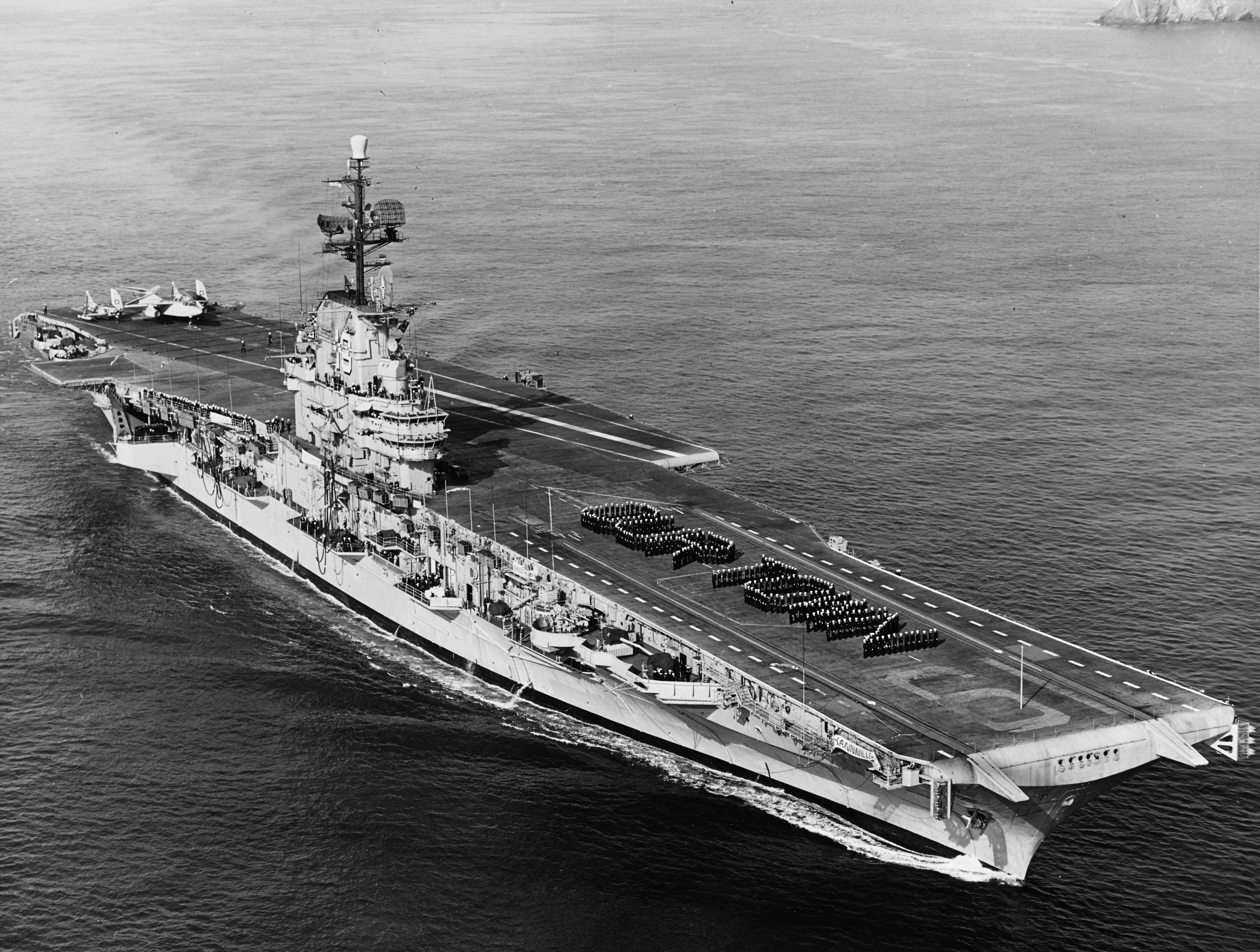
Hancock in San Francisco Bay in September 1957

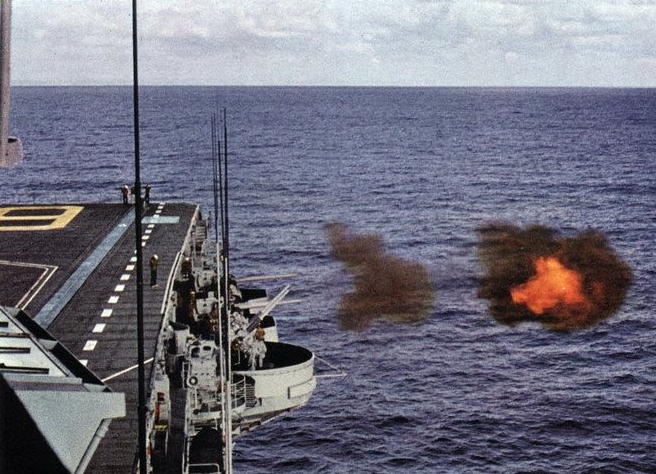
Hancock's 5-inch gun firing in 1957

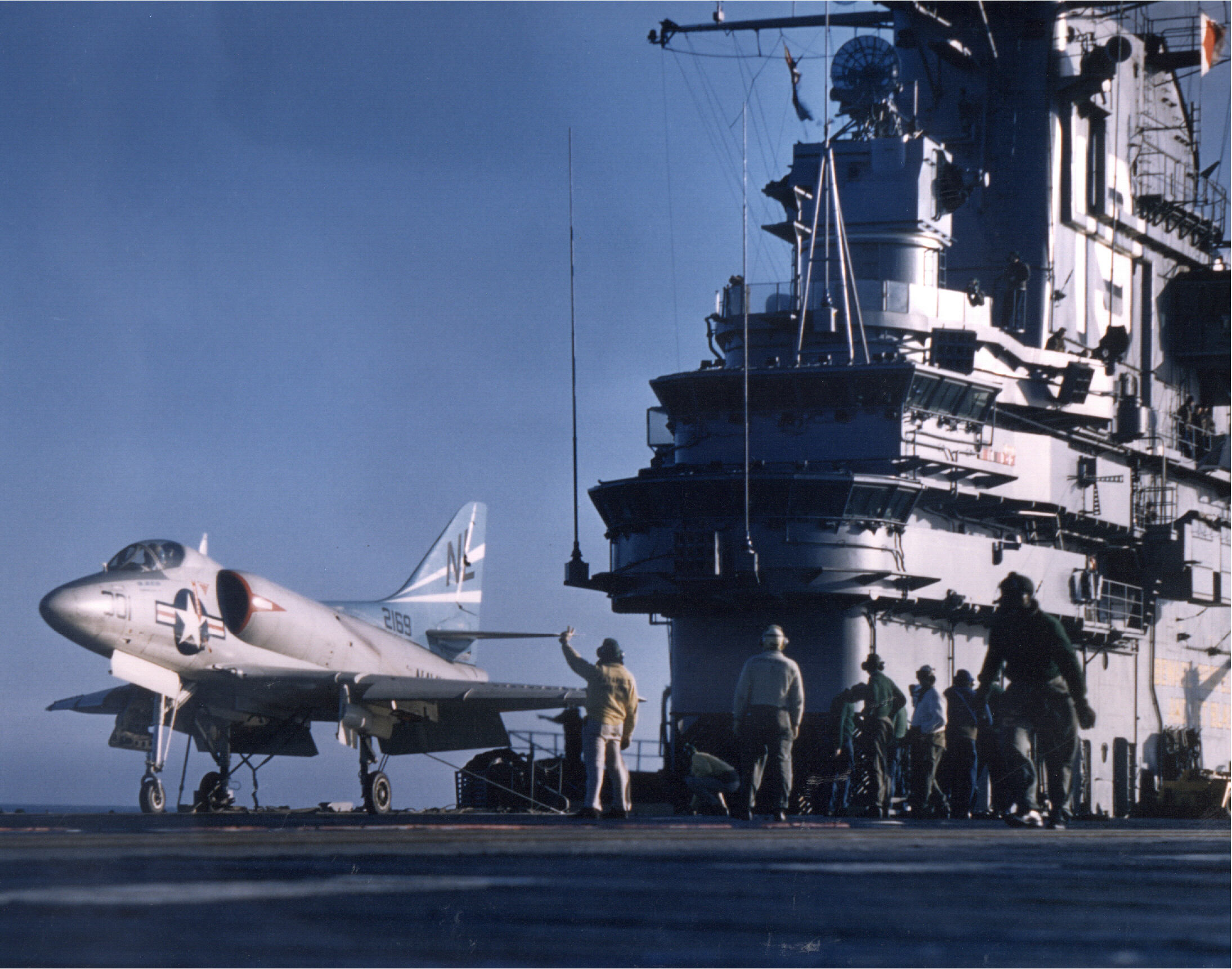
A-4 Skyhawk aboard Hancock in 1958

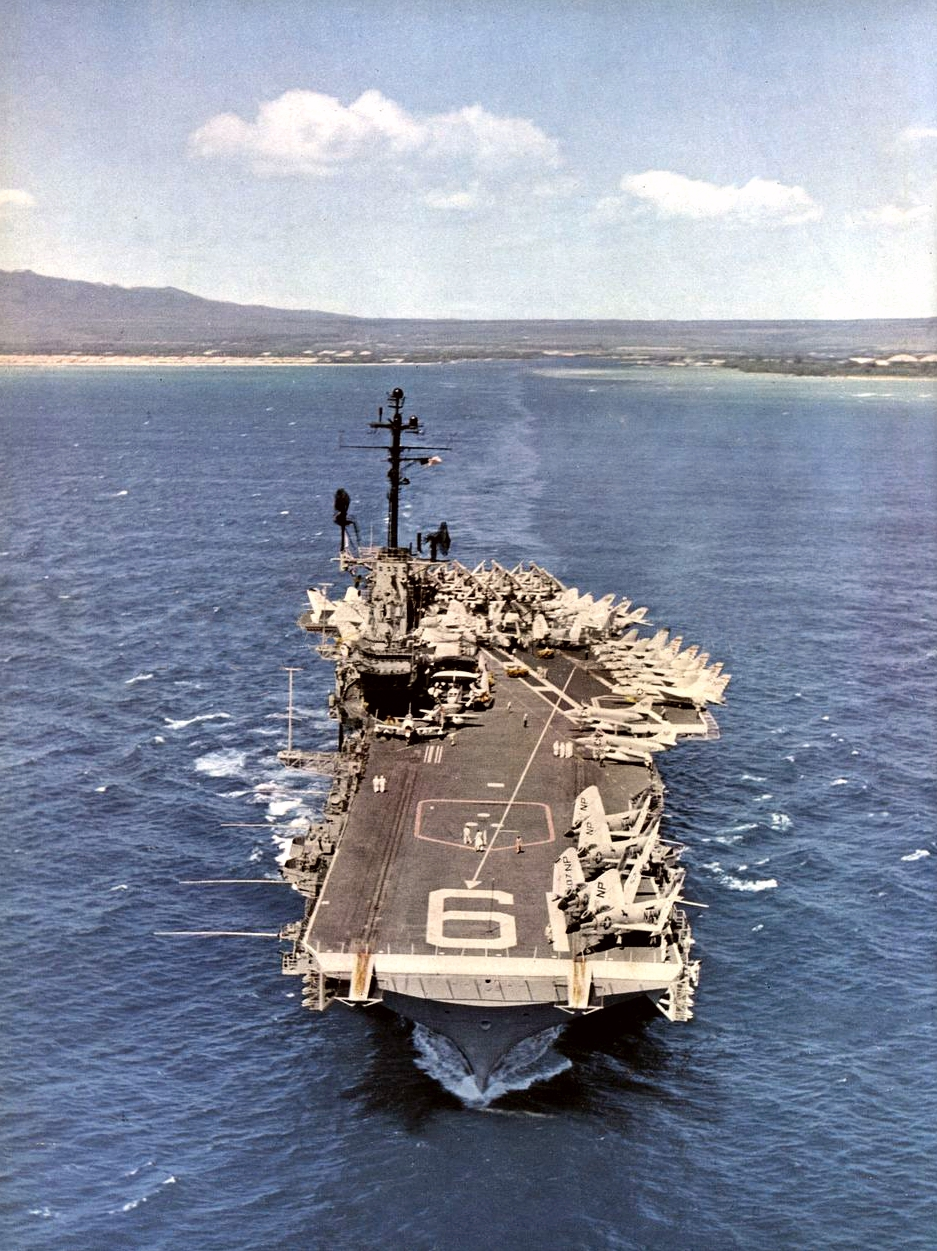
Hancock in 1962

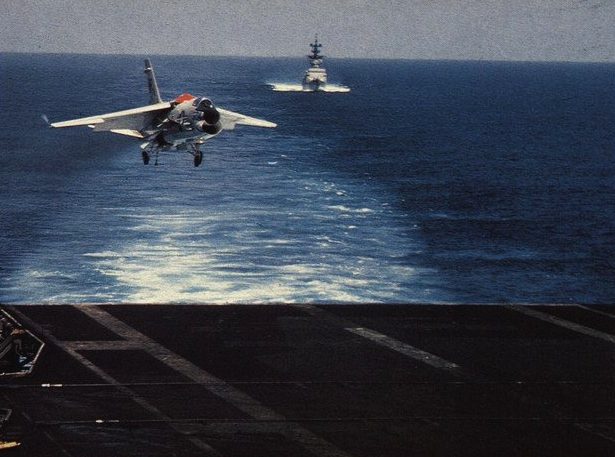
F-8J Crusader landing on Hancock in 1975

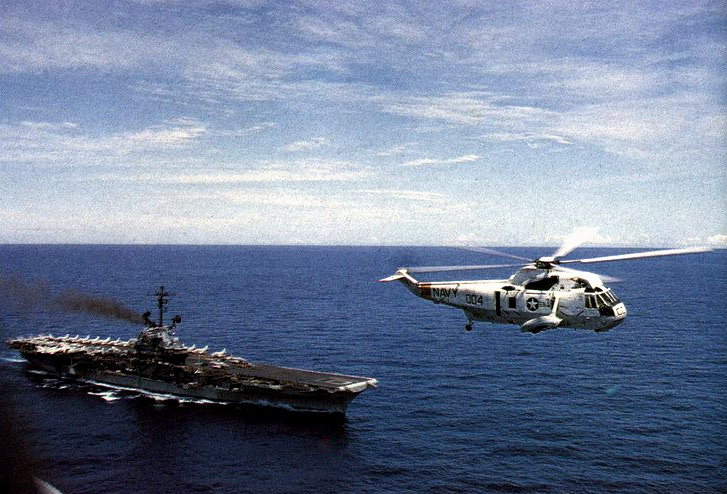
SH-3G Sea King with Hancock in 1975

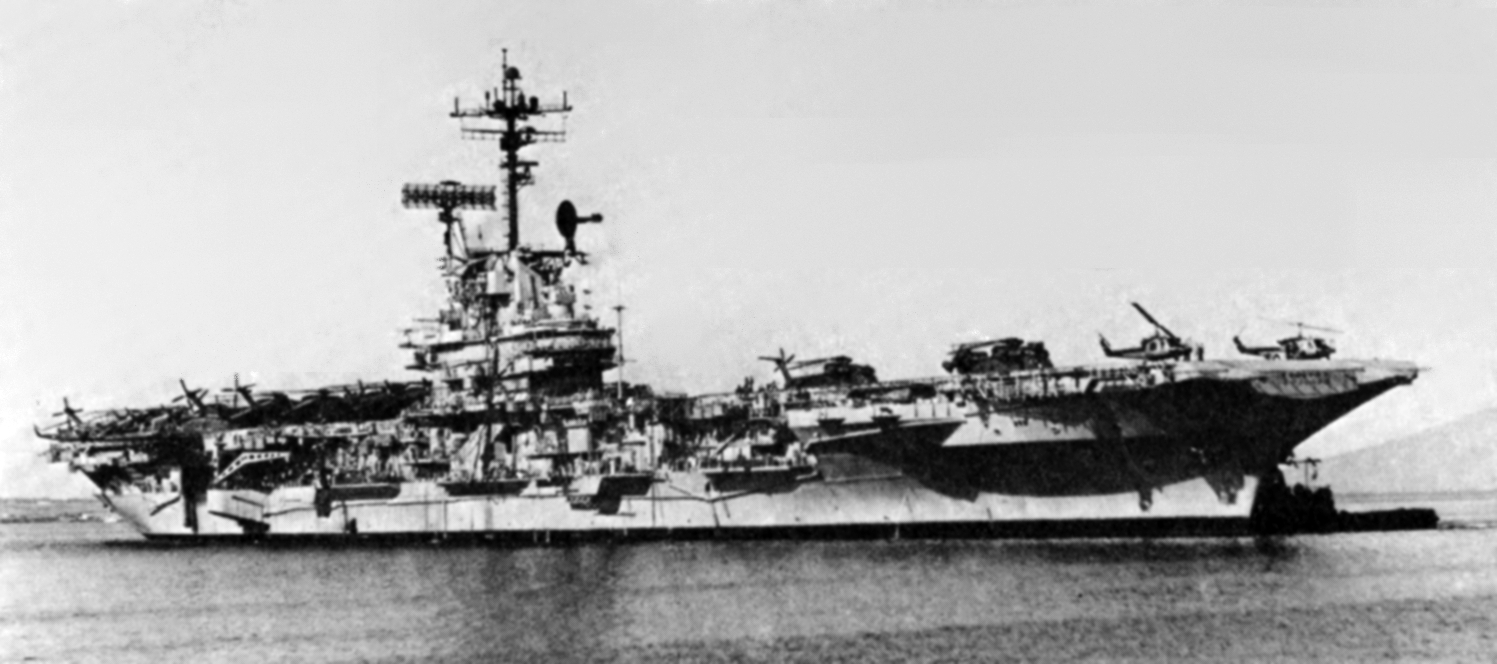
Hancock returning from Frequent Wind, 1975
