= List of United States servicemembers and civilians missing in action during the Vietnam War (1966–67) =

This article is a list of US MIAs of the Vietnam War in the period 1966–67. In 1973, the United States listed 2,646 Americans as unaccounted for from the entire Vietnam War. By October 2022, 1,582 Americans remained unaccounted for, of which 1,004 were classified as further pursuit, 488 as non-recoverable and 90 as deferred.

== 1966 ==
Date missing	Surname, First name(s)	Rank	Service	Unit	Operation/Battle Name	Location	Circumstances of loss	Recovery status
January 1	Kirksey, Robert L	Private First Class	US Army	46th Engineer Battalion		South Vietnam, Vũng Tàu	Drowned while swimming	Killed in action, body not recovered
January 2	MacLaughlin, Donald C	Lieutenant (LTJG)	US Navy	VA-76, USS Enterprise		South Vietnam, Duc Pho District	His A-4C Skyhawk (Bureau number 147704) hit the ground while making an attack in low cloud and fog, his body was later seen in the wreckage but could not be recovered due to enemy fire	Killed in action, body not recovered
January 7	Callanan, Richard J	Captain	USAF	774th Troop Carrier Squadron		South Vietnam, Pleiku	Pilot of C-130B Hercules (Tail number 61-0972), shot down while delivering ammunition to An Khê	Killed in action, body not recovered
January 7	Greenley, Jon A	1st Lieutenant	USAF	774th Troop Carrier Squadron		South Vietnam	Copilot of C-130B Hercules (Tail number 61-0972), shot down while delivering ammunition to An Khe	Killed in action, body not recovered
January 11	Godfrey, Johnny H	Captain	USAF	1131st Special Activities Squadron		South Vietnam, Sóc Trăng	His A-1H Skyraider was shot down on a strafing run, no ejection observed	Killed in action, body not recovered
January 16	Schoonover, Charles D	Lieutenant Commander	US Navy	RVAH-9, USS Ranger		South Vietnam, South China Sea	Pilot of RA-5C Vigilante (Tail number 149312) which failed to catch the arrester wire while landing, he applied power, an engine exploded and the aircraft crashed into the sea	Killed in action, body not recovered
January 16	Hollingsworth, Hal T	Ensign	US Navy	RVAH-9, USS Ranger		South Vietnam, South China Sea	Navigator on RA-5C Vigilante (Tail number 149312) which failed to catch the arrester wire while landing, the aircraft crashed into the sea	Killed in action, body not recovered
January 16	Neth, Fred A	Lieutenant Commander	US Navy	VF-24, USS Hancock		South Vietnam, South China Sea	His F-8C Crusader (Bureau number 147012) crashed at sea	Killed in action, body not recovered
January 16	Wood, Don C	Captain	USAF	354th Tactical Fighter Squadron	Operation Barrel Roll	Laos, Plain of Jars	His F-105D Thunderchief (Tail number 59–0171) was shot down while conducting a bomb damage assessment mission	Presumptive finding of death
January 21	Egan, James T	Captain	USMC	3rd Battalion 12th Marines		South Vietnam, Quảng Ngãi Province	Missing in an ambush while acting as forward observer on a reconnaissance patrol	Presumptive finding of death
January 22	Forman, William S	Captain	US Navy	VS-35, USS Hornet		North Vietnam, Gulf of Tonkin	Pilot of S-2D Tracker (Bureau number 149252) which disappeared while on a night patrol, a liferaft and flight helmet were later found at sea	Presumptive finding of death
January 22	Frenyea, Edmund H	Master Chief Aircraft Maintenanceman	US Navy	VS-35, USS Hornet		North Vietnam, Gulf of Tonkin	Crewman on an S-2D Tracker (Bureau number 149252) which disappeared while on a night patrol	Presumptive finding of death
January 22	Sennett, Robert R	Senior Chief Aviation Machinist	US Navy	VS-35, USS Hornet		North Vietnam, Gulf of Tonkin	Crewman on an S-2D Tracker (Bureau number 149252) which disappeared while on a night patrol	Presumptive finding of death
January 22	Templin, Erwin B	Lieutenant (LTJG)	US Navy	VS-35, USS Hornet		North Vietnam, Gulf of Tonkin	Copilot on an S-2D Tracker (Bureau number 149252) which disappeared while on a night patrol	Presumptive finding of death
January 24	Booze, Delmar G	2nd Lieutenant	USMC	VMFA-314		South Vietnam, Thừa Thiên Province	Bombardier/navigator on an F-4B Phantom II (Bureau number 152276) that disappeared south of Huế	Presumptive finding of death
January 24	Sprick, Doyle R	Captain	USMC	VMFA-314		South Vietnam, Thừa Thiên Province	Pilot of an F-4B Phantom II (Bureau number 152276) that disappeared south of Huế	Presumptive finding of death
January 24	Helber, Lawrence N	2nd Lieutenant	USMC	VMFA-314		South Vietnam, Quảng Nam Province	Bombardier/navigator on an F-4B Phantom II (Bureau number 152265) that disappeared south of Huế	Presumptive finding of death
January 24	Pitt, Albert	Major	USMC	VMFA-314		South Vietnam, Quảng Nam Province	Pilot of an F-4B Phantom II (Bureau number 152265) that disappeared south of Huế	Presumptive finding of death
January 29	McPherson, Fred L	Major	USAF	602d Special Operations Squadron		South Vietnam, Hậu Nghĩa Province	His A-1E Skyraider (Tail number 52-132412) crashed	Killed in action, body not recovered
January 29	Badolati, Frank N	Staff Sergeant	US Army	RT Roadrunner, Detachment B-52, 5th Special Forces Group	Operation Masher	South Vietnam, An Lão District, Bình Định Province	Killed during a reconnaissance patrol	Killed in action, body not recovered
January 29	Hodgson, Cecil J	Master Sergeant	US Army	RT Roadrunner, Detachment B-52, 5th Special Forces Group	Operation Masher	South Vietnam, An Lão District, Bình Định Province	Killed during a reconnaissance patrol	Presumptive finding of death
January 29	Terry, Ronald T	Staff Sergeant	US Army	RT Roadrunner, Detachment B-52, 5th Special Forces Group	Operation Masher	South Vietnam, An Lão District	Killed during a reconnaissance patrol	Killed in action, body not recovered
February 1	Alm, Richard A	Major	USMC	VMGR-152		North Vietnam, Gulf of Tonkin	Copilot on a KC-130F Hercules (Bureau number 149809) hit by ground fire while on a refueling mission near Hon Co Island	Killed in action, body not recovered
February 1	Coates, Donald L	Staff Sergeant	USMC	VMGR-152		North Vietnam, Gulf of Tonkin	Crewman on a KC-130F Hercules (Bureau number 149809) hit by ground fire while on a refueling mission near Hon Co Island	Killed in action, body not recovered
February 1	Humphrey, Galen F	Gunnery Sergeant	USMC	VMGR-152		North Vietnam, Gulf of Tonkin	Navigator on a KC-130F Hercules (Bureau number 149809) hit by ground fire while on a refueling mission near Hon Co Island	Killed in action, body not recovered
February 1	Luker, Russell B	Staff Sergeant	USMC	VMGR-152		North Vietnam, Gulf of Tonkin	Crewman on a KC-130F Hercules (Bureau number 149809) hit by ground fire while on a refueling mission near Hon Co Island	Killed in action, body not recovered
February 1	Prevost, Albert M	1st Lieutenant	USMC	VMGR-152		North Vietnam, Gulf of Tonkin	Pilot of a KC-130F Hercules (Bureau number 149809) hit by ground fire while on a refueling mission near Hon Co Island	Killed in action, body not recovered
February 1	Vlahakos, Peter G	Staff Sergeant	USMC	VMGR-152		North Vietnam, Gulf of Tonkin	Crew Chief on a KC-130F Hercules (Bureau number 149809) hit by ground fire while on a refueling mission near Hon Co Island	Killed in action, body not recovered
February 5	Asmussen, Glenn E	Shipfitter First Class	US Navy	USS Navasota		South Vietnam, South China Sea	Passenger on an SH-3A Sea King (Bureau number 149926) that crashed at sea during a crew transfer to the USS Ranger (CV-61)	Killed in action, body not recovered
February 5	McConnaughhay, Dan D	Shipfitter, Second Class	US Navy	USS Navasota		South Vietnam, South China Sea	Passenger on an SH-3A Sea King (Bureau number 149926) that crashed at sea during a crew transfer to the USS Ranger (CV-61)	Killed in action, body not recovered
February 5	Sparenberg, Bernard J	Chief Shipfitter	US Navy	USS Navasota		South Vietnam, South China Sea	Passenger on an SH-3A Sea King (Bureau number 149926) that crashed at sea during a crew transfer to the USS Ranger (CV-61)	Killed in action, body not recovered
February 10	Hopps, Gary D	Lieutenant	US Navy	VA-145, USS Ranger		North Vietnam, Quảng Bình Province	His A-1H Skyraider Sea King (Bureau number 137627) was hit by ground fire during a bombing run and crashed, no ejection observed	Killed in action, body not recovered
February 10	Hunter, Russell P	Captain	USAF	13th Bomb Squadron	Operation Barrel Roll	Laos, Ban Vangthon	Pilot of a B-57B Canberra (Tail Number 52-1575) lost on a night strike mission on the Ho Chi Minh Trail. Search and rescue forces located the wreckage, but could find no sign of the crew	Presumptive finding of death
February 10	Kiefel, Ernst P	Captain	USAF	13th Bomb Squadron	Operation Barrel Roll	Laos, Ban Vangthon	Bombardier/navigator on a B-57B Canberra (Tail Number 52-1575) lost on a night strike mission on the Ho Chi Minh Trail. Search and rescue forces located the wreckage, but could find no sign of the crew	Presumptive finding of death
February 14	Hills, John R	Major	USAF		Operation Barrel Roll	Laos, Saravane Province	His A-1E Skyraider (Tail number 52-132665) was hit by ground fire and crashed into a mountain northeast of Chavane	Presumptive finding of death
February 15	Mauterer, Oscar	Major	USAF	602d Special Operations Squadron	Operation Barrel Roll	Laos, Mụ Giạ Pass	His A-1E Skyraider (Tail number 52-133885) was hit by ground fire, he ejected and his parachute was seen to deploy and a rescue operation commenced but was driven off due to strong ground fire	Presumptive finding of death
February 18	Murray, Joseph V	Lieutenant (LTJG)	US Navy	VA-85, USS Kitty Hawk	Operation Rolling Thunder	North Vietnam	Pilot of A-6A Intruder (Bureau number 151797) which failed to pull up from a bombing run and hit the ground, no ejection observed	Killed in action, body not recovered
February 18	Schroeffel, Thomas A	Lieutenant (LTJG)	US Navy	VA-85, USS Kitty Hawk	Operation Rolling Thunder	North Vietnam	Bombardier/navigator on A-6A Intruder (Bureau number 151797) which failed to pull up from a bombing run and hit the ground, no ejection observed	Killed in action, body not recovered
February 25	Causey, John B	Captain	USAF	41st Tactical Electronic Warfare Squadron	Operation Rolling Thunder	North Vietnam, Gulf of Tonkin	Pilot of RB-66C Destroyer (tail number 54-0457) which was hit by an SA-2 near Vinh and crashed at sea, all other crewmembers were rescued	Killed in action, body not recovered
February 26	Newton, Donald S	Sergeant First Class	US Army	1st Battalion, 327th Infantry Regiment		South Vietnam, Tuy Hòa	Disappeared on a long range reconnaissance patrol	Presumptive finding of death
February 26	Wills, Francis D	Private First Class	US Army	1st Battalion, 327th Infantry Regiment		South Vietnam, Tuy Hòa	Disappeared on a long range reconnaissance patrol	Killed in action, body not recovered
March 1	Christensen, William M	Lieutenant (LTJG)	US Navy	VF-143, USS Ranger	Operation Rolling Thunder	North Vietnam, Gulf of Tonkin	Radar Intercept Officer on an F-4B that crashed at sea during low-level manoevuring	Presumptive finding of death
March 1	Frawley, William D	Lieutenant	US Navy	VF-143, USS Ranger	Operation Rolling Thunder	North Vietnam	Pilot of an F-4B that crashed at sea during low-level manoevuring	Presumptive finding of death
March 1	Woloszyk, Donald J	Lieutenant (LTJG)	US Navy	VA-55, USS Ranger	Operation Rolling Thunder	North Vietnam, Hà Tĩnh Province	His A-4E became separated from his flight and he said he was joining another flight but was not seen again	Presumptive finding of death
March 2	Worst, Karl E	Captain	USAF	23d Tactical Air Support Squadron	Operation Steel Tiger	Laos	His O-1E collided with an F-105 during a forward air control mission	Killed in action, body not recovered
March 4	Andrews, Stuart M	Captain	USAF	21st Tactical Air Support Squadron		South Vietnam, Bình Định Province	His O-1E was shot down on a visual reconnaissance mission. The remains of the passenger, 1st Lieutenant John F Conlon were identified in 2006	Presumptive finding of death
March 9	Collins, Willard M	Captain	USAF	4th Air Commando Squadron		South Vietnam, A Shau Valley	Pilot of an AC-47D #44-76290 that was hit by ground fire and crashed	Killed in action, body not recovered
March 9	Foster, Robert E	Staff Sergeant	USAF	4th Air Commando Squadron		South Vietnam, A Shau Valley	Crewman on an AC-47D that was hit by ground fire and crashed.	Killed in action, body not recovered
March 9	Peterson, Delbert R	1st Lieutenant	USAF	4th Air Commando Squadron		South Vietnam, A Shau Valley	Copilot of an AC-47D that was hit by ground fire and crashed. He was reported to be engaging the enemy while the other surviving crewmen were rescued by an HH-43	Presumptive finding of death
March 10	Taylor, James L	Sergeant	US Army	Detachment 503, 5th Special Forces Group		South Vietnam, A Shau Valley	Died from wounds received at the A Shau Special Forces Camp, his body was left behind during the evacuation	Killed in action, body not recovered
March 10	Xavier, Augusto M	1st Lieutenant	USMC	VMA-311		South Vietnam, A Shau Valley	His A-4C #148518 was shot down while on a close air support mission near the A Shau Special Forces Camp	Killed in action, body not recovered
March 13	Davis, Gene E	Staff Sergeant	USAF	4th Air Commando Squadron		Laos	Crewman on an AC-47 Spooky 73 lost on a nighttime air support mission	Presumptive finding of death
March 13	Duvall, Dean A	Sergeant	USAF	4th Air Commando Squadron		Laos	Gunner on an AC-47 lost on a nighttime air support mission	Presumptive finding of death
March 13	Henninger, Howard W	Captain	USAF	4th Air Commando Squadron		Laos	Pilot of an AC-47 lost on a nighttime air support mission	Presumptive finding of death
March 13	Morgan, Edwin E	Technical Sergeant	USAF	4th Air Commando Squadron		Laos	Loadmaster on an AC-47 lost on a nighttime air support mission	Presumptive finding of death until 17 June 2015 when he was accounted for
March 13	Olson, Gerald E	Captain	USAF	4th Air Commando Squadron		Laos	Navigator on an AC-47 lost on a nighttime air support mission	Presumptive finding of death
March 13	Pasekoff, Robert E	Captain	USAF	4th Air Commando Squadron		Laos	Copilot on an AC-47 lost on a nighttime air support mission	Presumptive finding of death
March 13	Pauley, Marshall I	Staff Sergeant	USAF	4th Air Commando Squadron		Laos	Gunner on an AC-47 lost on a nighttime air support mission	Presumptive finding of death
March 13	Parker, Udon	Specialist	US Army	1st Battalion, 327th Infantry		South Vietnam, Phú Yên Province	Drowned while on patrol	Killed in action, body not recovered
March 14	Hilton, Robert L	Airman First Class	USAF	33d Aerospace Rescue and Recovery Squadron		North Vietnam, Gulf of Tonkin	Crewman on an HU-16 hit by ground fire while on a rescue mission. The remains of another missing crewman Robert Pleiman were returned in 1988	Killed in action, body not recovered
March 14	Klute, Karl E	Captain	USAF	90th TacticalFighter Squadron		South Vietnam	His F-100D #3793 crashed on a close air support mission	Killed in action, body not recovered
March 15	Holmes, David H	Captain	USAF	22nd Tactical Air Support Squadron	Operation Barrel Roll	Laos, Savannakhet Province	His O-1E #56-2530 was shot down on a forward air control mission and he was seen in the cockpit of his crashed aircraft. When SAR forces arrived the following day the cockpit was empty	Presumptive finding of death
March 15	Scott, Martin R	Captain	USAF	HQ Squadron, 8th Tactical Fighter Wing	Operation Rolling Thunder	North Vietnam, Dien Bien Phu	Pilot of an F-4C shot down on an armed reconnaissance mission, no ejection observed	Presumptive finding of death until 18 August 2017 when he was accounted for
March 15	Stewart, Peter J	Lieutenant Colonel	USAF	HQ Squadron, 8th Tactical Fighter Wing	Operation Rolling Thunder	North Vietnam, Dien Bien Phu	Bombardier/navigator on an F-4C shot down on an armed reconnaissance mission, no ejection observed	Presumptive finding of death until 6 April 2018 when he was accounted for
March 18	McPherson, Everett A	1st Lieutenant	USMC	VMCJ-1	Operation Rolling Thunder	North Vietnam, Thanh Hóa Province	Pilot of an EF-10B #127041 hit by an SA-2. The remains of Lt Brent Davis, the electronic warfare officer, were identified in 1997	Presumptive finding of death
March 20	Beach, Arthur J	Captain	USMC	HMM-163		South Vietnam, Da Nang	Copilot of a UH-34D #149351 which crashed on a night medevac mission. The wreckage and remains of the other four crewmembers were discovered at sea the following month	Killed in action, body not recovered
March 21	Compton, Frank R	Lieutenant	US Navy	VA-94, USS Enterprise	Operation Rolling Thunder	North Vietnam, Gulf of Tonkin	Pilot of A-4C #149515 that exploded and crashed at sea	Killed in action, body not recovered
March 21	Tiderman, John M	Lieutenant Commander	US Navy	VA-94, USS Enterprise	Operation Rolling Thunder	North Vietnam, Gulf of Tonkin	Pilot of an A-4C #148499 that exploded and crashed at sea	Killed in action, body not recovered
March 23	Tapp, John B	Lieutenant Commander	US Navy	VA-93, USS Enterprise	Operation Rolling Thunder	North Vietnam, Gulf of Tonkin	His A-4C crashed at sea during a night landing	Killed in action, body not recovered
April 1	Grayson, William R	Commander	US Navy	VAH-4, USS Enterprise	Operation Rolling Thunder	North Vietnam, Gulf of Tonkin	Pilot of an A-3B(T) that crashed after launch	Killed in action, body not recovered
April 1	Krech, Melvin T	Petty Officer First Class	US Navy	VAH-4, USS Enterprise	Operation Rolling Thunder	North Vietnam, Gulf of Tonkin	Navigator on an A-3B(T) that crashed after launch	Killed in action, body not recovered
April 3	Laws, Richard L	Lieutenant	US Navy	VF-24, USS Hancock		North Vietnam, Thanh Hóa Province	His F-8 was hit by ground fire and crashed	Listed as killed in action, body not recovered until January 2013 when his remains were identified
April 5	Brown, James W	Private	USMC	1st Battalion 5th Marines		South Vietnam, Biên Hòa Province	Drowned while on patrol	Killed in action, body not recovered
April 6	Cook, Dennis P	Lieutenant	US Navy	VA-212, USS Hancock	Operation Rolling Thunder	North Vietnam, Gulf of Tonkin	His A-4E ditched after launch and he did not exit the aircraft	Killed in action, body not recovered
April 6	Gates, James W	Captain	US Army	20th Aviation Detachment		Laos, Saravane Province	Pilot of an OV-1A #63-1377 shot down on a visual reconnaissance mission. Both crewmen ejected successfully and their last radio transmissions said they were surrounded by enemy troops	Presumptive finding of death
April 6	Lafayette, John W	Captain	US Army	Operations Directorate (J-3), HQ, MACV		Laos, Saravane Province	Observer on an OV-1A #63-1377 shot down on a visual reconnaissance mission. Both crewmen ejected successfully and their last radio transmissions said they were surrounded by enemy troops	Presumptive finding of death
April 7	Barnett, Robert R	Captain	USAF	8th Bombardment Squadron	Operation Steel Tiger	Laos, Savannakhet Province	Pilot of a B-57B #52-1530 lost on a daytime bombing mission	Listed as killed in action, body not recovered until March 2017 when his remains were identified
April 7	Walker, Thomas T	Captain	USAF	8th Bombardment Squadron	Operation Steel Tiger	Laos, Savannakhet Province	Navigator of a B-57B lost on a daytime bombing mission	Killed in action, body not recovered
April 12	Conway, James B	Captain	US Army	Detachment A253, 5th Special Forces Group		South Vietnam, Kon Tum Province	Missing after the reconnaissance patrol he was leading was ambushed	Killed in action, body not recovered
April 12	Glasson, William A	Lieutenant Commander	US Navy	VAH-4, USS Kitty Hawk		China, Leizhou Peninsula	Pilot of a KA-3B shot down by the Chinese while flying from Naval Air Station Cubi Point to the USS Kitty Hawk in the Gulf of Tonkin. On 16 December 1975, the Chinese returned ashes they said were those of the fourth crewmember PRCS Kenneth Pugh	Presumptive finding of death
April 12	Harris, Rueben B	ATCS	US Navy	VAH-4, USS Kitty Hawk		China, Leizhou Peninsula	Crewman on a KA-3B shot down by the Chinese while flying from Naval Air Station Cubi Point to the USS Kitty Hawk in the Gulf of Tonkin	Presumptive finding of death
April 12	Jordan, Larry M	Lieutenant (LTJG)	US Navy	VAH-4, USS Kitty Hawk		China, Leizhou Peninsula	Copilot of a KA-3B shot down by the Chinese while flying from Naval Air Station Cubi Point to the USS Kitty Hawk in the Gulf of Tonkin	Presumptive finding of death
April 15	Zerbe, Michael R	Lieutenant (LTJG)	US Navy	HC-1 Detachment Charlie, USS Kitty Hawk		North Vietnam, Gulf of Tonkin	Pilot of UH-2B #150162 that crashed at sea	Killed in action, body not recovered
April 17	Tromp, William L	Lieutenant (LTJG)	US Navy	VA-115, USS Kitty Hawk		North Vietnam, Vinh	His A-1H crashed on a night armed reconnaissance mission	Presumptive finding of death
April 21	Austin, Ellis E	Lieutenant Commander	US Navy	VA-85, USS Kitty Hawk	Operation Rolling Thunder	North Vietnam	Bombardier/navigator on an A-6A that crashed on a bombing run	Presumptive finding of death
April 21	Keller, Jack E	Commander	US Navy	VA-85, USS Kitty Hawk	Operation Rolling Thunder	North Vietnam	Pilot of an A-6A that crashed on a bombing run	Presumptive finding of death
April 22	Nickerson, William B	Lieutenant (LTJG)	US Navy	VA-85, USS Kitty Hawk	Operation Rolling Thunder	North Vietnam, Vinh	Bombardier/navigator on an A-6A that crashed into the sea following a bombing run, no ejection observed	Killed in action, body not recovered
April 22	Weimorts, Robert F	Lieutenant Commander	US Navy	VA-85, USS Kitty Hawk	Operation Rolling Thunder	North Vietnam, Vinh	Pilot of an A-6A that crashed into the sea following a bombing run, no ejection observed	Killed in action, body not recovered
April 24	Cooper, William E	Lieutenant Colonel	USAF	469th Tactical Fighter Squadron	Operation Rolling Thunder	North Vietnam	His F-105D was hit by an SA-2 and the cockpit section broke off and was seen falling towards the ground, no ejection was observed	Presumptive finding of death until 22 December 2014 when he was accounted for
April 26	Anderson, Warren L	Captain	USAF	16th Tactical Reconnaissance Squadron	Operation Rolling Thunder	North Vietnam, Quảng Bình Province	Pilot of an RF-4C lost on a night photo-reconnaissance mission	Presumptive finding of death
April 26	Tucker, James H	1st Lieutenant	USAF	16th Tactical Reconnaissance Squadron	Operation Rolling Thinder	North Vietnam, Quảng Bình Province	Copilot of an RF-4C lost on a night photo-reconnaissance mission	Presumptive finding of death
April 29	Brown, Thomas E	Lieutenant (LTJG)	US Navy	VFA-211, USS Hancock	Operation Rolling Thunder	North Vietnam, Cat Ba Island	His F-8E #150867 hit a rock outcrop while attacking a vessel, no ejection observed	Killed in action, body not recovered
April 29	Bruch, Donald W	1st Lieutenant	USAF	333rd Tactical Fighter Squadron	Operation Rolling Thunder	North Vietnam	His F-105D #62-4304 was hit by ground fire, entered a steep dive and crashed, no ejection observed	Killed in action, body not recovered
April 29	Mullen, William F	Captain	USMC	MWHS-1	Operation Steel Tiger	Laos, Ban Karai Pass	His A-4E #151057 was lost on an attack mission	Presumptive finding of death
May 2	Wood, Walter S	Lieutenant Commander	US Navy	VA-55, USS Ranger	Operation Rolling Thunder	North Vietnam, Gulf of Tonkin	His A-4E #15103 crashed at sea, he ejected successfully but drowned before SAR forces could arrive	Killed in action, body not recovered
May 4	Malone, Jimmy M	Private	US Army	1st Battalion, 503rd Infantry Regiment		South Vietnam, Thừa Thiên Province	Believed to have been captured by Vietcong while collecting mail from another platoon's position	Presumptive finding of death
May 5	Dawes, John J	Sergeant First Class	US Army	2nd Battalion, 327th Infantry Regiment		South Vietnam	Passenger on a CH-47 that crashed at sea on a medevac flight, all other passengers and crew escaped.	Killed in action, body not recovered
May 9	Dexter, Bennie L	Airman	USAF	633rd Combat Support Group		South Vietnam, Darlac province	Believed to have been captured by Vietcong while driving a Jeep from Pleiku to Buôn Ma Thuột city, the abandoned Jeep was found 2 days later	Died in captivity, remains not returned
May 11	Feneley, Francis J	Captain	USAF	333rd Tactical Fighter Squadron	Operation Rolling Thunder	North Vietnam, Gulf of Tonkin	His F-105D was hit by ground fire and crashed at sea, no ejection observed	Killed in action, body not recovered
May 11	Villeponteaux, James H	1st Lieutenant	USMC	VMA-311	Operation Steel Tiger	Laos, Saravane	His A-4E #151995 collided with another aircraft from his squadron and crashed on a night bombing mission	Killed in action, body not recovered
May 14	King, Donald L	Captain	USAF	433rd Tactical Fighter Squadron	Operation Rolling Thunder	North Vietnam, Quảng Bình Province	Pilot of an F-4C #64-0760 hit by enemy fire on a night bombing mission	Presumptive finding of death
May 14	Ralston, Frank D	1st Lieutenant	USAF	433rd Tactical Fighter Squadron	Operation Rolling Thunder	North Vietnam, Quảng Bình Province	Bombardier/navigator of an F-4C hit by enemy fire on a night bombing mission	Presumptive finding of death
May 15	Balcom, Ralph C	Captain	USAF	421st Tactical Fighter Squadron	Operation Rolling Thunder	North Vietnam, Quảng Bình Province	His F-105D #61-0174 disappeared following a bombing mission near Đồng Hới	Presumptive finding of death
May 17	Deere, Donald T	Specialist	US Army	Detachment A-302, 5th Special Forces Group		South Vietnam	His MIKE Force patrol was ambushed near the Cambodian border, he was shot several times and his body was unable to be retrieved	Killed in action, body not recovered
May 18	Guillet, Andre R	Airman First Class	USAF	606th Air Commando Squadron	Operation Steel Tiger	Laos	Observer on an O-1E shot down on a visual reconnaissance mission over the Ho Chi Minh Trail	Presumptive finding of death
May 18	Harley, Lee D	Captain	USAF	Detachment 3, 505th Tactical Control Group	Operation Steel Tiger	Laos	Pilot of an O-1E shot down on a visual reconnaissance mission over the Ho Chi Minh Trail	Presumptive finding of death
May 18	Moore, William J	Staff Sergeant	USAF	310th Air Commando Squadron		South Vietnam, Bình Định Province	Crewman on a C-123B shot down on a night flareship mission east of Pleiku	Killed in action, body not recovered
May 18	Wall, Jerry M	Airman First Class	USAF	310th Air Commando Squadron		South Vietnam, Bình Định Province	Crewman on a C-123B shot down on a night flareship mission east of Pleiku	Killed in action, body not recovered. On 30 August 2012 the DPMO announced that his remains had been identified
May 21	Buckley, Louis	Sergeant	US Army	1st Battalion, 12th Cavalry Regiment		South Vietnam, An Khe	His mortar platoon was ambushed and overrun while awaiting helicopter pickup and he was seen to be wounded by survivors of the platoon	Presumptive finding of death
May 21	Thackerson, Walter A	Private First Class	US Army	2nd Battalion, 14th Infantry Regiment		South Vietnam	His platoon was amushed on a search and destroy mission, the platoon withdrew and he was found to be missing, the platoon returned to the ambush site but was unable to recover his body due to enemy fire	Killed in action, body not recovered
May 25	Glandon, Gary A	1st Lieutenant	USAF	391st Tactical Fighter Squadron		South Vietnam, Bình Định Province	Weapons Systems Officer on an F-4C #64-0722 that was seen to burst into flames and explode in midair, no ejection observed	Killed in action, body not recovered
May 26	Griffey, Terrence H	1st Lieutenant	USAF	391st Tactical Fighter Squadron		South Vietnam, Bình Định Province	Pilot of an F-4C #64-0722 that was seen to burst into flames and explode in midair, no ejection observed	Killed in action, body not recovered
May 31	Alberton, Bobby J	Staff Sergeant	USAF	61st Troop Carrier Squadron	Operation Carolina Moon	North Vietnam, Gulf of Tonkin	Navigator on a C-130E #64-0511 shot down while dropping a mine on the Song Ma river. An empty liferaft and aircraft wreckage were later seen by SAR forces. The remains of 3 of the crew were returned in 1986, and 2 other crewmen in 1998	Presumptive finding of death
May 31	Edmondson, William R	1st Lieutenant	USAF	61st Troop Carrier Squadron	Operation Carolina Moon	North Vietnam, Gulf of Tonkin	Navigator on a C-130E #64-0511 shot down while dropping a mine on the Song Ma river	Presumptive finding of death
May 31	McDonald, Emmett R	Captain	USAF	61st Troop Carrier Squadron	Operation Carolina Moon	North Vietnam, Gulf of Tonkin	Navigator on a C-130E #64-0511 shot down while dropping a mine on the Song Ma river	Presumptive finding of death
May 31	Herrold, Ned R	1st Lieutenant	USAF	497th Tactical Fighter Squadron	Operation Carolina Moon	North Vietnam, Gulf of Tonkin	Pilot of an F-4C #63-7664 shot down while flying a diversionary mission for the mine-laying mission. Aircraft crashed at sea, no ejection observed	Presumptive finding of death
May 31	Ragland, Dayton W	Lieutenant Colonel	USAF	497th Tactical Fighter Squadron	Operation Carolina Moon	North Vietnam, Gulf of Tonkin	Aircraft commander of an F-4C #63-7664 shot down while flying a diversionary mission for the mine-laying mission. Aircraft crashed at sea, no ejection observed	Presumptive finding of death
May 31	Steen, Martin W	Captain	USAF	469th Tactical Fighter Squadron	Operation Rolling Thunder	North Vietnam, Yên Bái Province	His F-105D was hit by enemy fire and he ejected. Search and rescue forces later located his empty parachute in a tree.	Presumptive finding of death
June 2	Rosato, Joseph F	Captain	USAF	558th Tactical Fighter Squadron		South Vietnam, Kon Tum Province	His F-4C #0744 was hit by enemy fire but he filed to eject from the aircraft.	Killed in action, body not recovered
June 9	Bush, Robert I	Captain	USAF	602nd Fighter Squadron	Operation Rolling Thunder	North Vietnam, Quảng Bình Province	Pilot of A-1E #52-133899	Killed in action, body not recovered
June 9	Shorack, Theodore J	Major	USAF	602nd Fighter Squadron	Operation Rolling Thunder	North Vietnam, Quảng Bình province	Pilot of A-1E #52-133899	Killed in action, body not recovered
June 12	Harris, Gregory J	Corporal	USMC	3rd Battalion 11th Marines		South Vietnam, Quảng Ngãi Province	Radioman assigned to the 5th Battalion, Republic of Vietnam Marine Division, missing in an ambush while on a search and destroy mission	Presumptive finding of death
June 13	Burkart, Charles W	Captain	USAF	13th Bomb Squadron	Operation Steel Tiger	Laos, Khammouane Province	Pilot of a B-57 lost on a nighttime bombing mission	Presumptive finding of death
June 13	Kerr, Everett O	Captain	USAF	13th Bomb Squadron	Operation Steel Tiger	Laos, Khammouane Province	Navigator on a B-57 lost on a nighttime bombing mission	Presumptive finding of death
June 13	Gierak, George G	Lieutenant (LTJG)	US Navy	VAP-61, USS Hancock	Operation Rolling Thunder	North Vietnam, Hà Tĩnh Province	Copilot of an RA-3B shot down on a nighttime photo-reconnaissance mission	Killed in action, body not recovered
June 13	Glanville, John T	Lieutenant Commander	US Navy	VAP-61, USS Hancock	Operation Rolling Thunder	North Vietnam, Hà Tĩnh Province	Pilot of an RA-3B shot down on a nighttime photo-reconnaissance mission	Killed in action, body not recovered
June 13	Lambton, Bennie R	Chief Petty Officer	US Navy	VAP-61, USS Hancock	Operation Rolling Thunder	North Vietnam, Hà Tĩnh Province	Photo-intelligenceman on an RA-3B shot down on a nighttime photo-reconnaissance mission	Killed in action, body not recovered
June 17	Adams, Oley N	Staff Sergeant	USAF	12th Armament Electronic Maintenance Squadron		South Vietnam, South China Sea	Passenger on a C-130E #63-7785 that exploded in midair shortly after takeoff from Cam Ranh Air Base. USS Fortify arrived at the wreckage field shortly after the crash and recovered the bodies of two crewmen	Killed in action, body not recovered
June 17	Cairns, Robert A	Staff Sergeant	USAF	51st Field Maintenance Squadron		South Vietnam, South China Sea	Passenger on a C-130E that exploded in midair shortly after takeoff from Cam Ranh Air Base	Killed in action, body not recovered
June 17	Cobbs, Ralph B	Lieutenant Commander	US Navy	VR-7		South Vietnam, South China Sea	Pilot of a C-130E that exploded in middair shortly after takeoff from Cam Ranh Air Base	Killed in action, body not recovered
June 17	Collette, Curtis D	Aviation Machinist, 2nd Class	US Navy	VR-7		South Vietnam, South China Sea	Flight mechanic on a C-130E that exploded in middair shortly after takeoff from Cam Ranh Air Base	Killed in action, body not recovered
June 17	Dempsey, Jack I	Yeoman, 2nd Class	US Navy	VR-7		South Vietnam, South China Sea	Radio operator on a C-130E that exploded in middair shortly after takeoff from Cam Ranh Air Base	Killed in action, body not recovered
June 17	Freng, Stanley J	Aviation Machinist 2nd Class	US Navy	VR-7		South Vietnam, South China Sea	Flight Mechanic on a C-130E that exploded in middair shortly after takeoff from Cam Ranh Air Base	Killed in action, body not recovered
June 17	Gravitte, Connie M	Captain	USAF	391st Tactical Fighter Squadron		South Vietnam, South China Sea	Passenger on a C-130E that exploded in middair shortly after takeoff from Cam Ranh Air Base	Killed in action, body not recovered
June 17	Hess, Gene K	Staff Sergeant	USAF	51st Field Maintenance Squadron		South Vietnam, South China Sea	Passenger on a C-130E that exploded in middair shortly after takeoff from Cam Ranh Air Base	Killed in action, body not recovered
June 17	Romig, Edward L	Lieutenant (LTJG)	US Navy	VR-7		South Vietnam, South China Sea	Navigator on a C-130E that exploded in middair shortly after takeoff from Cam Ranh Air Base	Killed in action, body not recovered
June 17	Savoy, M J	Airman	US Navy	VR-7		South Vietnam, South China Sea	Crewman on a C-130E that exploded in middair shortly after takeoff from Cam Ranh Air Base	Killed in action, body not recovered
June 17	Siegwarth, Donald E	Lieutenant (LTJG)	US Navy	VR-7		South Vietnam, South China Sea	Co-pilot of a C-130E that exploded in middair shortly after takeoff from Cam Ranh Air Base	Killed in action, body not recovered
June 17	Washburn, Larry E	Airman	USAF	51st Field Maintenance Squadron		South Vietnam, South China Sea	Passenger on a C-130E that exploded in middair shortly after takeoff from Cam Ranh Air Base	Killed in action, body not recovered
June 20	McDonough, John R	Lieutenant	US Navy	VAW-13, USS Hancock		North Vietnam, Gulf of Tonkin	His EA-1F ditched shortly after a night launch	Killed in action, body not recovered
June 20	Tunnell, John W	Lieutenant Commander	US Navy	VA-145, USS Ranger	Operation Rolling Thunder	North Vietnam, Gulf of Tonkin	His A-1H crashed at sea	Killed in action, body not recovered
June 22	Smith, Warren P	Captain	USAF	23rd Tactical Air Support Squadron	Operation Steel Tiger	Laos, Savannakhet Province	His O-1F was shot down on a forward air control mission	Presumptive finding of death
June 23	Belknap, Harry J	Ensign	US Navy	VF-151, USS Constellation	Operation Rolling Thunder	North Vietnam, Gulf of Tonkin	Radar Intercept Officer on F-4B #152324 that crashed at sea during a night carrier landing	Killed in action, body not recovered
June 23	Nyman, Lawrence F	Lieutenant (LTJG)	US Navy	VF-151, USS Constellation	Operation Rolling Thunder	North Vietnam, Gulf of Tonkin	Pilot of F-4B #152324 that crashed at sea during a night carrier landing	Killed in action, body not recovered
June 24	Ellis, William	Private First Class	US Army	1st Battalion, 35th Infantry Regiment		South Vietnam, Pleiku Province	His Company was covering the withdrawal of a reconnaissance platoon and he disappeared during the evacuation	Presumptive finding of death
June 25	Marik, Charles W	Lieutenant (LTJG)	US Navy	VA-65, USS Constellation	Operation Rolling Thunder	North Vietnam, Gulf of Tonkin	Bombardier/navigator on an A-6A #151816 shot down near Vinh, both crewmen ejected successfully over water, but SAR forces were unable to locate him	Presumptive finding of death
June 28	Cavalli, Anthony F	1st Lieutenant	USAF	603rd Air Commando Squadron	Operation Steel Tiger	Laos, Ban Karai Pass	Navigator on A-26A #44-17650 lost on a night attack mission	Killed in action, body not recovered
June 28	Dudley, Charles G	Captain	USAF	603rd Air Commando Squadron	Operation Steel Tiger	Laos, Ban Karai Pass	Pilot of A-26A #44-17650 lost on a night attack mission	Killed in action, body not recovered
June 28	Wolfe, Thomas H	Captain	USAF	23rd Tactical Air Support Squadron	Operation Steel Tiger	Laos	Observer on A-26A #44-17650 lost on a night attack mission	Killed in action, body not recovered
July 3	Gage, Robert H	Corporal	USMC	1st Anti-Tank Battalion, 1st Marine Division		South Vietnam, Quảng Nam Province	Disappeared from Thanh Thuy Village	Presumptive finding of death
July 6	Hestle, Roosevelt	Major	USAF	Detachment 1, 388th Tactical Fighter Wing	Operation Rolling Thunder	North Vietnam	Pilot of F-105F hit by ground fire and crashed, no ejection observed. The remains of the other crewman, Captain Charles E Morgan were returned in 1989	Presumptive finding of death until 22 June 2017 when he was accounted for
July 7	Pharris, William V	Private First Class	US Army	2nd Battalion, 14th Infantry Regiment		South Vietnam, Phu Cat	Shot and killed while on a search and destroy mission, his body was left behind due to enemy activity and when the area was reoccuppied his body had disappeared	Killed in action, body not recovered
July 8	Longanecker, Ronald L	Lance Corporal	USMC	3rd Reconnaissance Battalion		South Vietnam, Quảng Trị Province	Passenger on CH-46A #151947 hit by enemy fire and crashed, he was unable to escape the burning aircraft	Killed in action, body not recovered
July 14	Kipina, Marshall F	Private First Class	US Army	131st Aviation Company, 14th Aviation Battalion	Operation Steel Tiger	Laos, Attapeu Province	Observer on an OV-1C aircraft #61-2675 lost on a night surveillance mission	Presumptive finding of death until 6 April 2018 when he was accounted for
July 14	Nopp, Robert G	Captain	US Army	131st Aviation Company, 14th Aviation Battalion	Operation Steel Tiger	Laos, Attapeu Province	Pilot of OV-1C aircraft #61-2675 lost on a night surveillance mission	Presumptive finding of death until 27 February 2018 when he was accounted for
July 19	Winters, Darryl G	Airman First Class	USAF	Detachment 2, 600th Photo Squadron		South Vietnam, Long An Province	Air Force photographer on F-100F #58-1217 that was hit by ground fire and crashed	Killed in action, body not recovered
July 20	Dillon, David A	Specialist	US Army	68th Assault Helicopter Company, 145th Aviation Battalion		South Vietnam, Long An Province	Crew chief on a UH-1B hit by ground fire and crashed on an air assault mission. The remains of the other 3 crewmembers were recovered	Killed in action, body not recovered
July 20	Nobert, Craig R	1st Lieutenant	USAF	41st Tactical Reconnaissance Squadron	Operation Rolling Thunder	North Vietnam	Electronic warfare officer on an EB-66C hit by enemy fire, 2 crewmen ejected successfully and were captured	Presumptive finding of death
July 21	Tiffin, Rainford	Captain	USAF	34th Tactical Fighter Squadron	Operation Rolling Thunder	North Vietnam, Yên Bái Province	His F-105D #62-4227 was hit by enemy fire	Presumptive finding of death
July 22	Wells, Robert J	Private First Class	US Army	1st Battalion, 14th Infantry Regiment		South Vietnam	Drowned while on patrol	Killed in action, body not recovered
July 23	Smith, William W	Captain	USAF	505th Tactical Air Control Group	Operation Hastings	South Vietnam, Quảng Trị Province	His O-1E collided with a UH-34D and crashed while on a forward air control mission	Presumptive finding of death
July 29	Bossio, Galileo F	Major	USAF	388th Combat Support Group	Operation Rolling Thunder	North Vietnam	Pilot of RC-47D #43-48388 shot down while on an electronic intelligence mission. The remains of the other 5 crewmen were returned.	Presumptive finding of death
July 29	Di Tommasso, Robert J	1st Lieutenant	USAF	388th Combat Support Group	Operation Rolling Thunder	North Vietnam	Intelligence officer on RC-47D ~43-48388 shot down while on an electronic intelligence mission	Presumptive finding of death
July 29	Hoskinson, Robert E	Captain	USAF	6200th Combat Support Group	Operation Rolling Thunder	North Vietnam	Copilot of RC-47D #43-48388 shot down while on an electronic intelligence mission	Presumptive finding of death
July 29	Laws, Delmer L	Staff Sergeant	US Army	CCN, MACV-SOG, 5th Special Forces Group		Laos, Savannakhet Province	Disappeared after his reconnaissance patrol was ambushed	Killed in action, body not recovered
August 7	Fryer, Charles W	Lieutenant	US Navy	VA-152, USS Oriskany	Operation Rolling Thunder	North Vietnam, Gulf of Tonkin	His A-1H crashed at sea	Killed in action, body not recovered
August 7	Moran, Richard A	Lieutenant Commander	US Navy	VA-15, USS Intrepid	Operation Rolling Thunder	North Vietnam, Gulf of Tonkin	His A-4B #145040 crashed at sea	Killed in action, body not recovered
August 11	Allinson, David J	Captain	USAF	354th Tactical Fighter Squadron	Operation Rolling Thunder	North Vietnam, Yên Bái Province	His F-105D was hit by ground fire and he ejected successfully, but he did not contact SAR forces	Presumptive finding of death
August 14	Eaton, Curtis A	Major	USAF	357th Tactical Fighter Squadron	Operation Rolling Thunder	North Vietnam, Thái Nguyên province	His F-105 #59-1763 was hit by ground fire and he radioed that he was ejecting, no ejection observed	Presumptive finding of death
August 17	Kemp, Freddie	Private	US Army	1st Battalion, 7th Cavalry Regiment		South Vietnam, Pleiku Province	Drowned on patrol	Killed in action, body not recovered
August 18	Rykoskey, Edward J	Lance Corporal	USMC	3rd Reconnaissance Battalion		South Vietnam, Quảng Nam Province	His long-range reconnaissance patrol was ambushed while awaiting extraction, he was shot and unable to be recovered	Killed in action, body not recovered
August 20	Milikin, Richard M	1st Lieutenant	USAF	16th Tactical Reconnaissance Squadron	Operation Rolling Thunder	North Vietnam, Đồng Hới	Pilot of an RF-4C hit by ground fire on a night mission	Presumptive finding of death
August 21	Johnson, James R	Private First Class	US Army	1st Squadron, 9th Cavalry Regiment		South Vietnam, Pleiku Province	Drowned while on patrol	Killed in action, body not recovered
August 28	Babula, Robert L	Private First Class	USMC	3rd Battalion 1st Marines		South Vietnam, Quảng Nam Province	Member of a 4-man fire team that disappeared while moving to a night ambush position. The remains of 1 Marine, PFC Robert C Borton were returned in 1993	Presumptive finding of death
August 28	Bodenschatz, John E	Private First Class	USMC	3rd Battalion 1st Marines		South Vietnam	Member of a 4-man fire team that disappeared while moving to a night ambush position	Presumptive finding of death
August 28	Carter, Dennis R	Corporal	USMC	3rd Battalion 1st Marines		South Vietnam	Leader of a 4-man fire team that disappeared while moving to a night ambush position	Presumptive finding of death
August 28	Bullard, William H	Lieutenant (LTJG)	US Navy	VA-164, USS Oriskany	Operation Rolling Thunder	North Vietnam, Gulf of Tonkin	His A-4E crashed into the sea after launch	Killed in action, body not recovered
September 1	Nichols, Hubert C	Major	USAF	602nd Tactical Fighter Squadron	Operation Rolling Thunder	North Vietnam, Quảng Bình Province	His A-1E Sandy was hit by ground fire while on an SAR mission, no ejection observed	Presumptive finding of death
September 6	Bundy, Norman L	Lieutenant (LTJG)	US Navy	VFP-62, USS Franklin D. Roosevelt	Operation Rolling Thunder	North Vietnam, Gulf of Tonkin	His RF-8A #144624 crashed at sea	Killed in action, body not recovered
September 9	Fischer, John R	Captain	USMC	VMA-224		South Vietnam	His A-4E #150020 crashed	Killed in action, body not recovered
September 10	Tatum, Lawrence B	Major	USAF	1st Air Commando Squadron		North Vietnam	His A-1E #52-132675 was shot down, he ejected and landed within the DMZ but a rescue could not be attempted due to heavy enemy fire	Presumptive finding of death
September 14	Stoddard, Clarence W	Commander	US Navy	VA-25, USS Coral Sea	Operation Rolling Thunder	North Vietnam, Gulf of Tonkin	His A-1H #139756 was hit by a SAM and he crashed at sea	Killed in action, body not recovered
September 16	Robertson, John L	Major	USAF	555th Tactical Fighter Squadron	Operation Rolling Thunder	North Vietnam	Pilot of F-4C hit by ground fire. The weapons systems operator 1LT Hubert E Buchanan ejected successfully and was captured	Presumptive finding of death
September 19	Brown, Frank M	Lieutenant	US Navy	VF-151, USS Constellation	Operation Rolling Thunder	North Vietnam, Gulf of Tonkin	Pilot of F-4B #152315 that crashed into the sea following a night launch	Killed in action, body not recovered
September 19	Henry, David A	Lieutenant (LTJG)	US Navy	VF-151, USS Constellation	Operation Rolling Thunder	North Vietnam, Gulf of Tonkin	Radar intercept officer on F-4B #152315 that crashed into the sea following a night launch	Killed in action, body not recovered
September 19	Parsons, Don B	Lieutenant (LTJG)	US Navy	VF-154, USS Coral Sea	Operation Rolling Thunder	North Vietnam, Thanh Hóa Province	Pilot of an F-4B #152985 hit by a SAM on a night armed reconnaissance mission	Presumptive finding of death
September 19	Pilkington, Thomas H	Lieutenant (LTJG)	US Navy	VF-154, USS Coral Sea	Operation Rolling Thunder	North Vietnam, Thanh Hóa Province	Radar intercept office on an F-4B #152985 hit by a SAM on a night armed reconnaissance mission	Presumptive finding of death
September 20	Bloom, Richard M	1st Lieutenant	USMC	VMA-224		South Vietnam, Quảng Nam Province	His A-4E #150054 was hit by ground fire	Killed in action, body not recovered
September 21	Bauder, James R	Lieutenant Commander	US Navy	VF-21, USS Coral Sea	Operation Rolling Thunder	North Vietnam	Pilot of an F-4B #152973 lost on a night armed reconnaissance mission	Presumptive finding of death until 12 September 2017 when he was accounted for
September 21	Mills, James B	Lieutenant (LTJG)	US Navy	VF-21, USS Coral Sea	Operation Rolling Thunder	Quynh Luu District, North Vietnam	Radar intercept officer on an F-4B #152973 lost on a night armed reconnaissance mission	Presumptive finding of death until August 2018 when his remains recovered from an underwater crash site were identified
September 22	Knochel, Charles A	Lieutenant	US Navy	VA-176, USS Intrepid	Operation Rolling Thunder	North Vietnam, Gulf of Tonkin	His A-1H was hit by enemy fire and he ejected over the water, he apparently lost consciousness and drowned before SAR forces could arrive	Killed in action, body not recovered
September 24	Tice, Paul D	Lance Corporal	USMC	2nd Battalion 7th Marines		South Vietnam, Quảng Trị Province	Killed by artillery fire	Killed in action, body not recovered
September 24	Whittle, Junior L	Specialist	US Army	630th Ordnance Company		South Vietnam, Tuy Hòa	Drowned while swimming	Killed in action, body not recovered
September 25	Bossman, Peter R	Hospital Corpsman 3rd Class	US Navy	HMM-265		South Vietnam, Quảng Trị Province	Corpsman on a UH-34D #148776 of HMM-161 that was hit in mid-air by a friendly artillery shell on a night medevac mission. The UH-34 crashed and burned and rescue forces were only able to recover 2 bodies from the wreckage	Killed in action, body not recovered
September 25	Ducat, Phillip A	Captain	USMC	HMM-161		South Vietnam, Quảng Trị Province	Pilot of UH-34D #148776 that was hit in mid-air by a friendly artillery shell on a night medevac mission	Killed in action, body not recovered
September 25	Reiter, Dean W	1st Lieutenant	USMC	HMM-161		South Vietnam, Quảng Trị Province	Copliot of UH-34D #148776 that was hit in mid-air by a friendly artillery shell on a night medevac mission	Killed in action, body not recovered
September 25	Cushman, Clifton E	Captain	USAF	469th Tactical Fighter Squadron	Operation Rolling Thunder	North Vietnam, Lạng Sơn Province	His F-105D was hit by ground fire and broke up, he apparently ejected but no contact was made with SAR forces	Presumptive finding of death
September 26	Mosburg, Henry L	Captain	US Army	114th Assault Helicopter Company		South Vietnam, Vĩnh Bình province	Pilot of a UH-1B #64-13935 hit by enemy fire and crashed into the Son Co Chien river. The remains of the gunner SP4 Marvin F Phillips were returned in 2010	Killed in action, body not recovered
September 27	Spilman, Dyke A	1st Lieutenant	USAF	16th Tactical Reconnaissance Squadron	Operation Rolling Thunder	North Vietnam	Weapons systems operator on an RF-4C lost on a night photo-reconnaissance mission	Presumptive finding of death
September 27	Stine, Joseph M	Major	USAF	16th Tactical Reconnaissance Squadron	Operation Rolling Thunder	North Vietnam	Pilot of an RF-4C lost on a night photo-reconnaissance mission	Presumptive finding of death
September 28	Taylor, Danny G	Staff Sergeant	US Army	FOB-1, CCN, MACV-SOG		South Vietnam, Quảng Trị Province	Shot and killed during an ambush while on a reconnaissance patrol, his body was left behind due to strong enemy fire	Killed in action, body not recovered
September 29	Brasher, Jimmy M	1st Lieutenant	US Army	131st Aviation Company		North Vietnam, Gulf of Tonkin	Pilot of an OV-1C #64-14266 hit by a SAM on a night reconnaissance mission	Killed in action, body not recovered
September 29	Pittman, Robert E	Private First Class	US Army	131st Aviation Company		North Vietnam, Gulf of Tonkin	Observer on OV-1C #64-14266 hit by a SAM on a night reconnaissance mission	Killed in action, body not recovered
October 3	Echevarria, Raymond L	Sergeant First Class	US Army	RT Arizona, MACV-SOG	Operation Shining Brass	Laos, Savannakhet Province	Missing after his patrol was engaged by enemy forces and the patrol members chose to escape and evade the enemy	Presumptive finding of death
October 3	Jones, James E	Sergeant First Class	US Army	RT Arizona, MACV-SOG	Operation Shining Brass	Laos, Savannakhet Province	Missing after his patrol was engaged by enemy forces and the patrol members chose to escape and evade the enemy	Presumptive finding of death
October 3	Williams, Eddie L	Sergeant First Class	US Army	RT Arizona, MACV-SOG	Operation Shining Brass	Laos, Savannakhet Province	Missing after his patrol was engaged by enemy forces and the patrol members chose to escape and evade the enemy	Presumptive finding of death
October 5	Beene, James A	Lieutenant (LTJG)	US Navy	VA-152, USS Oriskany	Operation Rolling Thunder	North Vietnam, Gulf of Tonkin	His A-1H #137610 disappeared in cloud and an oil slick was later seen in the water	Presumptive finding of death
October 7	Gilchrist, Robert M	1st Lieutenant	USAF	497th Tactical Fighter Squadron	Operation Rolling Thunder	North Vietnam, Ba Đồn	Pilot of an RF-4C #63-7486 hit by enemy fire on a night reconnaissance mission	Presumptive finding of death
October 7	Pabst, Eugene M	1st Lieutenant	USAF	497th Tactical Fighter Squadron	Operation Rolling Thunder	North Vietnam, Ba Đồn	Weapons systems operator on RF-4C #63-7486 hit by enemy fire on a night reconnaissance mission	Presumptive finding of death
October 7	Knight, Larry D	1st Lieutenant	USAF	12th Tactical Reconnaissance Squadron		South Vietnam, South China Sea	Weapons systems operator on RF-4C #65-0885 that disappeared on a night photo-reconnaissance mission	Presumptive finding of death
October 7	Treece, James A	Captain	USAF	12th Tactical Reconnaissance Squadron		South Vietnam, South China Sea	Pilot of RF-4C #65-0885 that disappeared on a night photo-reconnaissance mission	Presumptive finding of death
October 10	Confer, Michael S	Lieutenant (LTJG)	US Navy	VA-23, USS Coral Sea	Operation Rolling Thunder	North Vietnam, Red River Delta	His A-4F #151150 failed to pull up from a strafing run and crashed into the water on a night armed reconnaissance mission, no ejection observed	Killed in action, body not recovered
October 13	Borden, Murray L	1st Lieutenant	USAF	480th Tactical Fighter Squadron	Operation Rolling Thunder	North Vietnam, Quảng Bình Province	Pilot of an F-4C #64-0654 that hit the ground on a bombing run during a night interdiction mission. The remains of the weapons systems operator 1LT Eugene T Meadows were identified in 1994	Presumptive finding of death
October 14	Thomas, Darwin J	Ensign	US Navy	VA-152, USS Oriskany	Operation Rolling Thunder	North Vietnam, Nghệ An Province	His A-1H #139731 hit the ground during an attack run on a night armed reconnaissance mission	Killed in action, body not recovered
October 18	Adams, Steven H	Airman First Class	USAF	37th Aerospace Rescue and Recovery Squadron (37th ARRS)	Operation Rolling Thunder	North Vietnam, Gulf of Tonkin	Pararescueman on HU-16 #51-7145 lost in poor weather on an afternoon search and rescue patrol	Presumptive finding of death
October 18	Angstadt, Ralph H	Major	USAF	37th ARRS	Operation Rolling Thunder	North Vietnam, Gulf of Tonkin	Pilot of HU-16 #51-7145 lost in poor weather on an afternoon search and rescue patrol	Presumptive finding of death
October 18	Clark, Lawrence	Staff Sergeant	USAF	37th ARRS	Operation Rolling Thunder	North Vietnam, Gulf of Tonkin	Radio operator on HU-16 #51-7145 lost in poor weather on an afternoon search and rescue patrol	Presumptive finding of death
October 18	Hill, Robert L	Technical Sergeant	USAF	37th ARRS	Operation Rolling Thunder	North Vietnam, Gulf of Tonkin	Flight mechanic on HU-16 #51-7145 lost in poor weather on an afternoon search and rescue patrol	Presumptive finding of death
October 18	Long, John H	1st Lieutenant	USAF	37th ARRS	Operation Rolling Thunder	North Vietnam, Gulf of Tonkin	Co-pilot of HU-16 #51-7145 lost in poor weather on an afternoon search and rescue patrol	Presumptive finding of death
October 18	Rackley, Inzar W	Captain	USAF	37th ARRS	Operation Rolling Thunder	North Vietnam, Gulf of Tonkin	Navigator on HU-16 #51-7145 lost in poor weather on an afternoon search and rescue patrol	Presumptive finding of death
October 18	Shoneck, John R	Staff Sergeant	USAF	38th Aerospace Rescue and Recovery Squadron	Operation Rolling Thunder	North Vietnam, Gulf of Tonkin	Flight mechanic on HU-16 #51-7145 lost in poor weather on an afternoon search and rescue patrol	Presumptive finding of death
October 19	Burke, Michael J	Lance Corporal	USMC	1st Battalion 4th Marines		South Vietnam, Quảng Trị Province	Disappeared while swimming in the Cua Viet River	Presumptive finding of death
October 19	Lewandowski, Leonard J	Private First Class	USMC	1st Battalion 4th Marines		South Vietnam, Quảng Trị Province	Disappeared while swimming in the Cua Viet River	Presumptive finding of death
October 19	Mishuk, Richard E	Private First Class	USMC	1st Battalion 4th Marines		South Vietnam, Quảng Trị Province	Disappeared while swimming in the Cua Viet River	Presumptive finding of death
October 21	Earll, David J	Captain	USAF	469th Tactical Fighter Squadron	Operation Rolling Thunder	North Vietnam	His F-105D exploded while on an attack run, no ejection observed	Presumptive finding of death
October 22	Harris, Harold L	Private First Class	US Army	1st Battalion, 5th Cavalry Regiment		South Vietnam, Bình Định Province	Drowned while on patrol	Killed in action, body not recovered
October 22	McBride, Earl P	Lieutenant Commander	US Navy	VF-161, USS Constellation	Operation Rolling Thunder	North Vietnam, Gulf of Tonkin	Pilot of F-4B #151009 that crashed at sea	Killed in action, body not recovered
October 25	Green, Robert B	Staff Sergeant	USAF	432nd Field Maintenance Squadron		Laos	Passenger on a Royal Lao Air Force C-47 RLAF # 0398 that crashed	Killed in action, body not recovered
October 25	Levan, Alvin L	Seaman 3rd Class	US Navy	Coastal Division 13, Task Force 115		South Vietnam, South China Sea	Gunner's mate on PCF-87, he suffered a seizure, fell overboard and drowned offshore Bình Định Province	Killed in action, body not recovered
October 26	Morrison, Glenn R	Captain	USAF	614th Tactical Fighter Squadron		South Vietnam, Tây Ninh Province	His F-100D #3167 crashed	Presumptive finding of death
October 27	Johnson, Dale A	Major	USAF	355th Tactical Fighter Wing	Operation Rolling Thunder	North Vietnam, Quang Khe	His F-105D was making a bombing run when it burst into flames and broke up, no ejection observed	Killed in action, body not recovered
November 1	Weaver, George R	Petty Officer Second Class	US Navy	Mine Squadron 11, Task Force 116		South Vietnam, Ngha Be	Engineman on MSB-54, he was below deck when it hit a mine and sank	Killed in action, body not recovered
November 2	Kline, Robert E	Major	USAF	421st Tactical Fighter Squadron	Operation Rolling Thunder	North Vietnam, Yên Bái Province	His F-105D #60-0469 was hit by ground fire and crashed	Presumptive finding of death
November 4	Hunt, William B	Staff Sergeant	US Army	Detachment A-302, 5th Special Forces Group		South Vietnam, Tây Ninh Province	Platoon leader of a MIKE Force that was ambushed, he was mortally wounded and stayed behind while the rest of his unit moved to an evacuation zone	Presumptive finding of death
November 4	Scungio, Vincent A	Captain	USAF	13th Tactical Fighter Squadron	Operation Rolling Thunder	North Vietnam, Bac Ha District	Co-pilot of an F-105F #63-8273 shot down on a Wild Weasel mission. In 1989 the remains of the pilot Major Robert E Brinckmann were returned.	Presumptive finding of death
November 10	Carter, William T	Lieutenant (LTJG)	US Navy	VS-21, USS Kearsarge		North Vietnam, Gulf of Tonkin	Co-pilot of S-2E lost on a night surveillance flight	Killed in action, body not recovered
November 10	McAteer, Thomas J	Lieutenant	US Navy	VS-21, USS Kearsarge		North Vietnam, Gulf of Tonkin	Pilot of S-2E lost on a night surveillance flight	Killed in action, body not recovered
November 10	Riordan, John M	Aviation Structural Mechanic, 3rd Class	US Navy	VS-21, USS Kearsarge		North Vietnam, Gulf of Tonkin	Anti-submarine warfare technician on an S-2E lost on a night surveillance flight	Killed in action, body not recovered
November 10	Schoderer, Eric J	Aviation Antisubmarine Warfare Technician 3rd Class	US Navy	VS-21, USS Kearsarge		North Vietnam, Gulf of Tonkin	Anti-submarine warfare technician on an S-2E lost on a night surveillance flight	Killed in action, body not recovered
November 10	O'Brien, John L	Captain	USAF	1st Air Commando Squadron		Laos	His A-1E was shot down	Killed in action, body not recovered
November 12	Frosio, Robert C	Commander	US Navy	VA-12, USS Franklin D. Roosevelt	Operation Rolling Thunder	North Vietnam, Gulf of Tonkin	His A-4E #155048 collided with another A-4E and crashed on a night landing approach	Killed in action, body not recovered
November 12	Jones, James G	Lieutenant (LTJG)	US Navy	VA-12, USS Franklin D. Roosevelt	Operation Rolling Thunder	North Vietnam, Gulf of Tonkin	His A-4E #150051 collided with another A-4E and crashed on a night landing approach	Killed in action, body not recovered
November 15	Keiper, John C	Corporal	USMC	Helicopter Attack Maintenance Squadron 16		South Vietnam, Thừa Thiên Province	Passenger on a US Army U-6A #54-1723 that disappeared in bad weather on a flight from Đông Hà Combat Base to Da Nang	Presumptive finding of death
November 15	Ravenna, Harry M	Captain	US Army	138th Aviation Company, 224th Aviation Regiment (United States)		South Vietnam, Thừa Thiên Province	Pilot of U-6A #54-1723 that disappeared in bad weather on a flight from Dong Ha to Da Nang	Killed in action, body not recovered
November 15	Timmons, Bruce A	Radioman 3rd Class	US Navy	PCF Division 102, TF-115		South Vietnam, Quảng Nam Province	Crewman on PCF-77 which capsized and sank during a storm	Presumptive finding of death
November 16	Piittmann, Alan D	Airman	USAF	5th Air Commando Squadron		Laos, Savannakhet Province	Passenger on an A-1G hit by enemy fire on a flight from Nha Trang to Udorn Air Base in Thailand. The pilot and copilot both ejected and were later rescued and reported that Pittman had successfully escaped from the plane	Presumptive finding of death
November 18	Arnold, William T	Lieutenant	US Navy	VA-22, USS Coral Sea	Operation Rolling Thunder	North Vietnam, Gulf of Tonkin	His A-4C #148496 disappeared in overcast weather while making an attack run	Presumptive finding of death
November 19	Johnstone, James M	Captain	US Army	131st Aviation Company		Laos, Attapeu Province	Observer on an OV-1A #13115 that hit the ground on a low-level reconnaissance mission, no ejection observed	Killed in action, body not recovered. On 6 September 2012 the DPMO announced that his remains had been identified
November 19	Whited, James L	Major	US Army	20th Aviation Detachment		Laos, Attapeu Province	Pilot of OV-1A #13115 that hit the ground on a low-level reconnaissance mission, no ejection observed	Killed in action, body not recovered. On 5 September 2012 the DPMO announced that his remains had been identified
November 25	Gardner, Glenn V	Private	US Army	4th Battalion, 12th Infantry Regiment		South Vietnam, South China Sea	Jumped overboard from the USNS General Daniel I. Sultan while en route to South Vietnam	Killed in action, body not recovered
November 25	Niehouse, Daniel L	Civilian				South Vietnam, Long Khánh Province	Captured by Vietcong while driving by jeep from Saigon to Dalat. Last seen alive in January 1967	Died in captivity, remains not returned
November 28	Hoeffs, John H	Specialist	US Army	1st Battalion, 8th Infantry Regiment		South Vietnam, Phú Yên Province	Drowned while swimming	Killed in action, body not recovered
December 2	Bott, Russell P	Staff Sergeant	US Army	RT Viper, Detachment B-52 Delta, 5th Special Forces Group		Laos	Member of a 6-man long range reconnaissance patrol ambushed by enemy forces. After a 2-day running battle the group was overrun.	Presumptive finding of death
December 2	Stark, Willie E	Sergeant First Class	US Army	RT Viper, Detachment B-52 Delta, 5th Special Forces Group		Laos	Leader of a 6-man long range reconnaissance patrol ambushed by enemy forces. After a 2-day running battle the group was overrun	Killed in action, body not recovered
December 2	Dyer, Irby	Sergeant	US Army	Detachment B-52 Delta, 5th Special Forces Group		Laos	Medic aboard UH-1D #65-10088 shot down while trying to recover the remains of Recon Team Viper	Killed in action, body not recovered
December 2	Sulander, Daniel A	Warrant Officer	US Army	281st Assault Helicopter Company		Laos	Pilot of UH-1D #65-10088 shot down while trying to recover the remains of Recon Team Viper	Killed in action, body not recovered
December 2	Nystrom, Bruce A	Commander	US Navy	VA-172, USS Franklin D. Roosevelt	Operation Rolling Thunder	North Vietnam, Red River Delta	His A-4C #145143 was believed to have been hit by a SAM while on a night armed reconnaissance mission	Presumptive finding of death
December 7	Carlson, John W	Captain	USAF	10th Fighter Commando Squadron, 3rd Tactical Fighter Wing		South Vietnam, Lai Khe	His F-5C #65-10520 was hit by ground fire and crashed into the ground, no ejection observed	Killed in action, body not recovered
December 11	Alfred, Gerald O	Lieutenant	USAF	480th Tactical Fighter Squadron	Operation Rolling Thunder	North Vietnam, Gulf of Tonkin	Weapons Systems Operator on an F-4C hit by enemy fire on an F4C on a night armed reconnaissance mission. The aircraft ditched near the USS Keppler and the crew were able to rescue the pilot Captain Jerry Woodcock	Presumptive finding of death
December 14	Brigham, Albert	Lance Corporal	USMC	2nd Battalion 1st Marines		South Vietnam	Drowned while investigating an ambush of Vietcong	Killed in action, body not recovered
December 14	Holman, Gerald A	Lieutenant (LTJG)	US Navy	VAW-12, USS Franklin D. Roosevelt	Operation Rolling Thunder	North Vietnam, Gulf of Tonkin	Passenger on E-1B that suffered an engine failure and ditched, 2 crewmembers were rescued	Killed in action, body not recovered
December 14	Koenig, Edwin L	Lieutenant Commander	US Navy	VAW-12, USS Franklin D. Roosevelt	Operation Rolling Thunder	North Vietnam, Gulf of Tonkin	Pilot of E-1B that suffered an engine failure and ditched, 2 crewmembers were rescued	Killed in action, body not recovered
December 14	Mowrey, Richard L	Lieutenant (LTJG)	US Navy	VAW-12, USS Franklin D. Roosevelt	Operation Rolling Thunder	North Vietnam, Gulf of Tonkin	Copilot of E-1B that suffered an engine failure and ditched, 2 crewmembers were rescued	Killed in action, body not recovered
December 20	Lum, David A	1st Lieutenant	USAF	497th Tactical Fighter Squadron		South Vietnam, South China Sea	Pilot of F-4C #0698 that entered an uncontrollable spin and crashed while on a ferry flight from Clark Air Base to Ubon Royal Thai Air Force Base	Killed in action, body not recovered
December 23	Kerns, Arthur W	Private	US Army	2nd Battalion, 14th Infantry Regiment		South Vietnam, Gia Định Province	Disappeared while cashing checks near Tan Son Nhut Air BaseUnaccounted for	Presumptive finding of death
December 23	Reeves, John H	Lance Corporal	USMC	1st Battalion, 1st Marines		South Vietnam, Quảng Nam Province	Drowned	Killed in action, body not recovered

== 1967 ==
Date missing	Surname, First name(s)	Rank	Service	Unit	Operation/Battle Name	Location	Circumstances of loss	Recovery status
January 1	Bullock, Larry A	Private First Class	US Army	1st Battalion, 5th Cavalry Regiment		South Vietnam, Bình Định Province	Drowned while swimming	Killed in action, body not recovered
January 10	Gauley, James P	Captain	USAF	34th Tactical Fighter Squadron	Operation Barrel Roll	Laos, Plain of Jars	His F-105D was hit by enemy fire	Killed in action, body not recovered
January 10	Stoves, Merritt	Private First Class	US Army	1st Battalion, 503rd Infantry Regiment		South Vietnam, Bình Dương Province	Drowned while on patrol	Killed in action, body not recovered
January 12	Kemp, Clayton C	Aviation Antisubmarine Warfare Technician 3rd Class	US Navy	HS-8, USS Bennington		North Vietnam, Gulf of Tonkin	Crewman on SH-3A #149909 that crashed at sea on a night patrol	Killed in action, body not recovered
January 12	Reinecke, Wayne C	Aviation Antisubmarine Warfare Technician 3rd Class	US Navy	HS-8, USS Bennington		North Vietnam, Gulf of Tonkin	Crewman on SH-3A #149909 that crashed at sea on a night patrol	Killed in action, body not recovered
January 14	Canup, Franklin H	Electrician 2nd Class	US Navy	Mine Squadron 11		South Vietnam, Gia Định Province	Crewman on MSB-14 that was rammed and sunk by a merchant ship at night	Killed in action, body not recovered
January 16	Welch, Robert J	Captain	USAF	11th Tactical Reconnaissance Squadron	Operation Rolling Thunder	North Vietnam	Pilot of RF-4C #65-0883 shot down on a photo-reconnaissance mission. The weapons system operator 1LT Michael Scott Kerr ejected successfully and was captured	Presumptive finding of death
January 17	Krogman, Alva R	1st Lieutenant	USAF	23rd Tactical Air Support Squadron	Operation Steel Tiger	Laos, Savannakhet Province	His O-1F #57-2789 was shot down on a FAC mission	Killed in action, body not recovered until 7 July 2020 when he was accounted for
January 17	Wozniak, Frederick J	1st Lieutenant	USAF	11th Tactical Reconnaissance Squadron	Operation Rolling Thunder	North Vietnam, Thanh Hóa Province	Weapons system operator on RF-4C #65-0888 shot down on a photo-reconnaissance mission	Presumptive finding of death
January 17	Wright, Gary G	Major	USAF	11th Tactical Reconnaissance Squadron	Operation Rolling Thunder	North Vietnam, Thanh Hóa Province	Pilot of RF-4C #65-0888 shot down on a photo-reconnaissance mission	Presumptive finding of death
January 18	Madsen, Marlow E	Lieutenant (LTJG)	US Navy	VA-52, USS Ticonderoga	Operation Rolling Thunder	North Vietnam, Gulf of Tonkin	His A-1H #139748 overshot the flight deck while landing, stalled and crashed into the sea	Killed in action, body not recovered
January 19	Ashby, Donald R	Lieutenant Commander	US Navy	VF-114, USS Kitty Hawk		South Vietnam, South China Sea	Pilot of F-4B #153029 that crashed at sea after launch	Killed in action, body not recovered
January 19	Ehrlich, Dennis M	Lieutenant (LTJG)	US Navy	VF-114, USS Kitty Hawk		South Vietnam, South China Sea	Radar intercept officer on F-4B #153029 that crashed at sea after launch	Killed in action, body not recovered
January 24	Simpson, Max C	Private First Class	US Army	155th Transportation Company		South Vietnam, Cam Ranh Bay	Drowned while swimming	Killed in action, body not recovered
January 21	Hogan, Jerry F	Lieutenant (LTJG)	US Navy	VA-112, USS Kitty Hawk	Operation Rolling Thunder	North Vietnam, Sơn La province	His A-4C #145144 crashed while on a bombing run during an armed reconnaissance mission	Presumptive finding of death
January 25	Wallace, Arnold B	Private	US Army	2nd Battalion, 47th Infantry Division		South Vietnam, South China Sea	Jumped overboard from the USS General John Pope while en route to South Vietnam	Killed in action, body not recovered
January 28	Thornton, William D	Private First Class	US Army	2nd Battalion, 3rd Infantry Regiment		South Vietnam, Long An Province	Drowned while on patrol	Killed in action, body not recovered
January 31	Barden, Howard L	Captain	USAF	12th Air Commando Squadron	Operation Ranch Hand	Laos, Savannakhet Province	Navigator on UC-123B #54-0611 hit by enemy fire and crashed inverted on a low-level defoliation mission	Killed in action, body not recovered
January 31	Kubley, Roy R	Captain	USAF	12th Air Commando Squadron	Operation Ranch Hand	Laos, Savannakhet Province	Copliot of UC-123B #54-0611 hit by enemy fire on a low-level defoliation mission	Killed in action, body not recovered
January 31	Miyazaki, Ronald K	Airman First Class	USAF	12th Air Commando Squadron	Operation Ranch Hand	Laos, Savannakhet Province	Flight mechanic on UC-123B #54-0611 hit by enemy fire on a low-level defoliation mission	Killed in action, body not recovered
January 31	Mulhauser, Harvey	Captain	USAF	12th Air Commando Squadron	Operation Ranch Hand	Laos, Savannakhet Province	Navigator on UC-123B #54-0611 hit by enemy fire on a low-level defoliation mission	Killed in action, body not recovered
January 31	Walker, Lloyd F	Major	USAF	12th Air Commando Squadron	Operation Ranch Hand	Laos, Savannakhet Province	Pilot of UC-123B #54-0611 hit by enemy fire on a low-level defoliation mission	Killed in action, body not recovered
February 3	Johnson, August D	Seaman	US Navy	PBR-113, River Division 52	Operation Game Warden	South Vietnam, Mỹ Tho	Jumped overboard from his Patrol Boat, River to escape a Viecong grenade and drowned	Killed in action, body not recovered
February 6	Heiskell, Lucius L	Captain	USAF	23rd Tactical Air Support Squadron	Operation Steel Tiger	North Vietnam, Mu Gia Pass	His O-1F was shot down while on a 2 aircraft FAC mission and he successfully parachuted from his aircraft. He was rescued by HH-3E #65-12779, callsign Jolly Green 05 which was then hit by enemy fire and crashed in flames into a karst peak	Presumptive finding of death
February 6	Hall, Donald J	Staff Sergeant	USAF	Detachment 5, 38th ARRS		North Vietnam, Mu Gia Pass	Flight mechanic on HH-3E #65-12779, callsign Jolly Green 05 which was hit by enemy fire and crashed in flames into a karst peak, the pararescueman A2C Dwayne Hackney was blown from the helicopter and rescued by SAR forces	Presumptive finding of death
February 6	Kibbey, Richard A	Captain	USAF	Detachment 5, 38th ARRS		North Vietnam, Mu Gia Pass	Copilot of HH-3E #65-12779, callsign Jolly Green 05 which was hit by enemy fire and crashed in flames into a karst peak	Presumptive finding of death
February 6	Wood, Patrick H	Major	USAF	Detachment 5, 38th ARRS		North Vietnam, Mu Gia Pass	Pilot of HH-3E #65-12779, callsign Jolly Green 05 which was hit by enemy fire and crashed in flames into a karst peak	Presumptive finding of death until 27 May 2016 when he was accounted for
February 12	Carlson, Paul V	Lieutenant (LTJG)	US Navy	VF-96, USS Enterprise		North Vietnam, Gulf of Tonkin	Radar intercept officer on F-4B #152219 that crashed at sea during intercept training	Killed in action, body not recovered
February 12	Sullivan, Martin J	Lieutenant Commander	US Navy	VF-96, USS Enterprise		North Vietnam, Gulf of Tonkin	Pilot of F-4B #152219 that crashed at sea during intercept training	Killed in action, body not recovered
February 12	Weissmueller, Courtney E	Major	USAF	306th Tactical Fighter Squadron		Laos	His F-100D was shot down	Presumptive finding of death
February 14	Marvin, Robert C	Lieutenant	US Navy	VA-115, USS Hancock		North Vietnam, Gulf of Tonkin	His A-1H had engine failure shortly after takeoff and crashed at sea	Killed in action, body not recovered
February 21	Borja, Domingo R	Sergeant First Class	US Army	MACV-SOG		Laos, Saravane Province	Shot and killed while on patrol, his body was left behind due to strong enemy presence	Killed in action, body not recovered
February 21	Wright, Arthur	Specialist	US Army	1st Battalion, 44th Artillery Regiment		South Vietnam, Đông Hà	Disappeared at night while checking perimeter wire	Presumptive finding of death
February 25	Hart, Joseph L	Lieutenant Colonel	USAF	1st Air Commando Squadron		Laos	Aircraft crash	Killed in action, body not recovered
February 27	Alwan, Harold J	Major	USMC	VMA-121		South Vietnam, Quảng Tín Province	His A-4E #152051 disappeared on a test flight	Presumptive finding of death
February 27	Huie, Litchfield P	Lieutenant	US Navy	HC-1, USS Bon Homme Richard		North Vietnam, Gulf of Tonkin	Pilot of UH-2B that crashed shortly after takeoff	Killed in action, body not recovered
February 27	Letchworth, Edward N	Lieutenant (LTJG)	US Navy	HC-1, USS Bon Homme Richard		North Vietnam, Gulf of Tonkin	Copilot of UH-2B that crashed shortly after takeoff	Killed in action, body not recovered
February 27	Sause, Bernard J	Airman	US Navy	HC-1, USS Bon Homme Richard		North Vietnam, Gulf of Tonkin	Crewman on UH-2B that crashed shortly after takeoff	Killed in action, body not recovered
February 27	Zempel, Ronald L	Airman	US Navy	HC-1, USS Bon Homme Richard		North Vietnam, Gulf of Tonkin	Aircrew Survival Equipmentman on UH-2B that crashed shortly after takeoff	Killed in action, body not recovered
February 28	Moore, James R	Corporal	USMC	A Company, 9th Engineer Battalion		South Vietnam, Da Nang	Disappeared from his base near Da Nang	Presumptive finding of death
March 6	Carpenter, Howard B	Sergeant	US Army	Detachment B-50, MACV-SOG		Laos, Saravane Province	Shot and killed during an ambush while on a long range patrol, his body was left behind due to strong enemy presence	Killed in action, body not recovered
March 6	Small, Burt C	Sergeant	US Army	Detachment A-108, 5th Special Forces Group		South Vietnam, Quảng Ngãi Province	Wounded and disappeared when his CIDG patrol was ambushed. SAR forces were unable to locate his body the following day	Presumptive finding of death
March 7	Miller, Robert L	Lieutenant	US Navy	VF-191, USS Ticonderoga	Operation Rolling Thunder	North Vietnam, Gulf of Tonkin	His F-8E #150350 crashed at sea following a bombing mission	Killed in action, body not recovered
March 8	Crain, Carroll O	Lieutenant Commander	US Navy	VAH-4, USS Kitty Hawk	Operation Rolling Thunder	North Vietnam, Gulf of Tonkin	Pilot of RA-3B that disappeared on a night reconnaissance mission	Presumptive finding of death
March 8	Galvin, Ronald E	Seaman Apprentice	US Navy	VAH-4, USS Kitty Hawk	Operation Rolling Thunder	North Vietnam, Gulf of Tonkin	Aviation electronics technician on RA-3B that disappeared on a night reconnaissance mission	Presumptive finding of death
March 8	Pawlish, George F	Lieutenant (LTJG)	US Navy	VAH-4, USS Kitty Hawk	Operation Rolling Thunder	North Vietnam, Gulf of Tonkin	Copilot of RA-3B that disappeared on a night reconnaissance mission	Presumptive finding of death
March 12	Adrian, Joseph D	1st Lieutenant	USAF	308th Tactical Fighter Squadron		South Vietnam, South China Sea	His F-100 #55-3611 disappeared offshore from Phú Yên Province on a night combat mission	Killed in action, body not recovered
March 13	Harris, Paul W	Private First Class	USMC	HMM-163		South Vietnam, Quảng Trị Province	Crew chief on UH-34D #150574 hit by enemy fire while extracting a reconnaissance team, crashed and burned. The copilot 2LT Robert Swete survived and the pilot Maj Peter Samaras later died from burns	Killed in action, body not recovered
March 13	Terwilliger, Virgil B	Lance Corporal	USMC	HMM-163		South Vietnam, Quảng Trị Province	Gunner on UH-34D #150574 hit by enemy fire, crashed and burned	Killed in action, body not recovered
March 15	Smith, Dean	Lieutenant (LTJG)	US Navy	VF-24, USS Bon Homme Richard	Operation Rolling Thunder	North Vietnam, Gulf of Tonkin	His F-8C #147027 crashed at sea offshore Nghệ An Province	Killed in action, body not recovered
March 17	Goeden, Gene W	Lieutenant (LTJG)	US Navy	VA-115, USS Hancock	Operation Rolling Thunder	North Vietnam, Gulf of Tonkin	His A-1H #135225 crashed at sea	Killed in action, body not recovered
March 19	Austin, Joseph C	Lieutenant Colonel	USAF	34th Tactical Fighter Squadron	Operation Rolling Thunder	North Vietnam, Ban Karai Pass	His F-105D crashed into ground on a bombing run, no ejection observed	Presumptive finding of death
March 21	Charvet, Paul C	Lieutenant	US Navy	VA-215, USS Bon Homme Richard	Operation Sea Dragon	North Vietnam, Gulf of Tonkin	His A-1H #137516 crashed in bad weather near Hon Me Island	Presumptive finding of death until 14 May 2021 when he was accounted for
March 24	Ellison, John C	Lieutenant Commander	US Navy	VA-85, USS Kitty Hawk	Operation Rolling Thunder	North Vietnam, Bắc Giang Province	Pilot of A-6A #151587 shot down on a strike mission. The remains of the bombardier/navigator LT (LTJG) James Plowman were recovered in 1996 and identified in September 2006	Presumptive finding of death
March 24	Hallberg, Roger C	Staff Sergeant	US Army	Detachment A-302, 5th Special Forces Group		South Vietnam, Bù Đốp District	Advisor/platoon leader for a MIKE Force that was ambushed while on patrol, he was wounded and last seen providing covering fire as the unit was evacuated	Presumptive finding of death
March 24	Stewart, Jack T	Captain	US Army	Detachment A-302, 5th Special Forces Group		South Vietnam, Bù Đốp District	Advisor to a Strike Force Company that was ambushed while on patrol, he was wounded and last seen providing covering fire as the unit was evacuated	Presumptive finding of death
March 25	Hise, James H	Lieutenant (LTJG)	US Navy	VF-53, USS Hancock		South Vietnam, South China Sea	His F-8E crashed at sea on a non-combat mission	Killed in action, body not recovered
April 1	Govan, Robert A	Major	USAF	606th Air Commando Squadron	Operation Steel Tiger	Laos, Savannakhet Province	Pilot of a T-28D hit by enemy fire and crashed on a night armed reconnaissance mission, no ejection observed	Presumptive finding of death
April 1	Williams, David R	Major	USAF	606th Air Commando Squadron	Operation Steel Tiger	Laos, Savannakhet Province	Instructor-pilot of a T-28D hit by enemy fire and crashed on a night armed reconnaissance mission, no ejection observed	Presumptive finding of death
April 1	Jourdenais, George H	Major	USAF	557th Tactical Fighter Squadron		South Vietnam, Quảng Nam Province	Pilot of F-4C #64-8746 that crashed during a bombing run	Presumptive finding of death
April 1	Stanley, Robert W	1st Lieutenant	USAF	557th Tactical Fighter Squadron		South Vietnam, Quảng Nam Province	Weapons system operator on F-4C #64-8746 that crashed during a bombing run	Presumptive finding of death
April 4	Martin, David E	Ensign	US Navy	VF-92, USS Enterprise		North Vietnam, Gulf of Tonkin	Radar intercept officer on F-4B #152984, that crashed following a mid-air collision	Killed in action, body not recovered
April 4	Szeyller, Edward P	Lieutenant	US Navy	VF-92, USS Enterprise		North Vietnam, Gulf of Tonkin	Pilot of F-4B #152984, that crashed following a mid-air collision	Killed in action, body not recovered
April 5	Parker, Thomas A	Hospital Corpsman 1st Class	US Navy	MABS-36, MAG-36		South Vietnam, Quảng Ngãi Province	Corpsman on a UH-1E medevac helicopter, hit by enemy fire and crashed	Killed in action, body not recovered
April 9	Schworer, Ronald P	Specialist	US Army	4th Battalion, 47th Infantry Regiment		South Vietnam, Kien Phong Province	Drowned while on patrol	Killed in action, body not recovered
April 10	O'Grady, John F	Major	USAF	357th Tactical Fighter Squadron	Operation Rolling Thunder	North Vietnam, Mu Gia Pass	His F-105D #62-4357 was hit by enemy fire on a bombing run, he ejected successfully but no contact was made with SAR forces	Presumptive finding of death
April 17	Carlton, James E	Captain	USMC	VMA-242	Operation Rolling Thunder	North Vietnam, Nghệ An Province	Bombardier/navigator on A-6A shot down on a night bombing mission	Presumptive finding of death
April 17	McGarvey, James M	Major	USMC	VMA-242	Operation Rolling Thunder	North Vietnam, Nghệ An Province	Pilot of A-6A shot down on a night bombing mission	Presumptive finding of death
April 21	Hamilton, Roger D	Lance Corporal	USMC	2nd Battalion 1st Marines		South Vietnam, Quảng Tín Province	Wounded during an assault on a Vietcong held village, he disappeared when the Vietcong counter-attacked	Presumptive finding of death
April 21	Hasenbeck, Paul A	Private First Class	US Army	4th Battalion, 31st Infantry Regiment		South Vietnam, Quảng Ngãi Province	Disappeared while on river patrol in a sampan	Presumptive finding of death
April 21	Mangino, Thomas A	Specialist	US Army	4th Battalion, 31st Infantry Regiment		South Vietnam, Quảng Ngãi Province	Disappeared while on river patrol in a sampan	Presumptive finding of death
April 21	Nidds, Daniel R	Private First Class	US Army	3rd Battalion, 82nd Artillery Regiment		South Vietnam, Quảng Ngãi Province	Disappeared while on river patrol in a sampan	Presumptive finding of death
April 21	Winters, David M	Private First Class	US Army	4th Battalion, 31st Infantry Regiment		South Vietnam, Quảng Ngãi Province	Disappeared while on river patrol in a sampan	Presumptive finding of death
April 24	Austin, Charles D	1st Lieutenant	USAF	433rd Tactical Fighter Squadron	Operation Rolling Thunder	North Vietnam, Hanoi	Bombardier/navigator on F-4C #63-7641 hit by enemy fire and exploded, no ejection observed	Presumptive finding of death
April 24	Knapp, Herman L	Major	USAF	433rd Tactical Fighter Squadron	Operation Rolling Thunder	North Vietnam	Pilot of F-4C #63-7641 hit by enemy fire and exploded, no ejection observed	Presumptive finding of death
April 26	Estocin, Michael J	Lieutenant Commander	US Navy	VA-192, USS Ticonderoga	Operation Rolling Thunder	North Vietnam	His A-4E #151073 was hit by a SAM while on a Suppression of Enemy Air Defenses mission, no ejection observed	Presumptive finding of death
April 27	Benton, James A	Lance Corporal	USMC	A Company, 3rd Engineer Battalion		South Vietnam, South China Sea	Passenger on UH-34D #14871 of HMM-263 that crashed at sea on takeoff from the USS Point Defiance	Killed in action, body not recovered
April 27	Castro, Reinaldo A	Sergeant	USMC	A Company, 3rd Engineer Battalion		South Vietnam, South China Sea	Passenger on UH-34D #14871 that crashed at sea on takeoff from the USS Point Defiance	Killed in action, body not recovered
April 27	Dallas, Richard H	Lance Corporal	USMC	HMM-263		South Vietnam, South China Sea	Crewman on UH-34D #14871 that crashed at sea on takeoff from the USS Point Defiance	Killed in action, body not recovered
April 27	Dyer, Blenn C	Lance Corporal	USMC	H&S Company, 1st Battalion 3rd Marines		South Vietnam, South China Sea	Passenger on UH-34D #14871 that crashed at sea on takeoff from the USS Point Defiance	Killed in action, body not recovered
April 27	Osborne, Samuel W	Private First Class	USMC	A Company, 3rd Engineer Battalion		South Vietnam, South China Sea	Passenger on UH-34D #14871 that crashed at sea on takeoff from the USS Point Defiance	Killed in action, body not recovered
April 27	Pennington, Ronald K	Lance Corporal	USMC	A Company, 3rd Engineer Battalion		South Vietnam, South China Sea	Passenger on UH-34D #14871 that crashed at sea on takeoff from the USS Point Defiance	Killed in action, body not recovered
April 30	McPhee, Randy N	Private First Class	USMC	3rd Battalion 3rd Marines	Battle of Hill 881S	South Vietnam, Quảng Trị Province	Killed by grenades, his body couldn't be recovered due to enemy fire	Killed in action, body not recovered
May 1	Bailey, John H	Sergeant	USMC	3rd Battalion 5th Marines		South Vietnam, South China Sea	Wounded during Operation Union, medevac passenger on CH-46A #150268 of HMM-165 that crashed at sea en route to the USS Sanctuary	Killed in action, body not recovered
May 1	Corfield, Stan L	Staff Sergeant	USMC	HMM-165		South Vietnam, South China Sea	Gunner on CH-46A #150268 that crashed at sea en route to the USS Sanctuary	Killed in action, body not recovered
May 1	Gaughan, Roger C	Corporal	USMC	3rd Battalion 5th Marines		South Vietnam, South China Sea	Wounded during Operation Union, medevac passenger on CH-46A #150268 that crashed at sea en route to the USS Sanctuary	Killed in action, body not recovered
May 1	Guajardo, Hilario H	Private First Class	USMC	1st Battalion 5th Marines		South Vietnam, South China Sea	Wounded during Operation Union, medevac passenger on CH-46A #150268 that crashed at sea en route to the USS Sanctuary	Killed in action, body not recovered
May 1	Smith, Carl A	Lance Corporal	USMC	B Company, 1st Shore Party Battalion		South Vietnam, South China Sea	Wounded during Operation Union, medevac passenger on CH-46A #150268 that crashed at sea en route to the USS Sanctuary	Killed in action, body not recovered
May 1	Soulier, Duwayne	Private First Class	USMC	HQ Company, 7th Communication Battalion		South Vietnam, South China Sea	Wounded during Operation Union, medevac passenger on CH-46A #150268 that crashed at sea en route to the USS Sanctuary	Killed in action, body not recovered
May 3	Moore, Ralph E	Private First Class	US Army	2nd Battalion, 35th Infantry Regiment		South Vietnam	Triggered a large land mine while on patrol, no recoverable remains	Killed in action, body not recovered
May 4	Rogers, Charles E	Major	USAF	1st Air Commando Squadron	Operation Steel Tiger	Laos, Attapeu Province	His A-1E #52-132638 was shot down while making a bombing run, no ejection observed	Killed in action, body not recovered
May 8	Steimer, Thomas J	Lieutenant (LTJG)	US Navy	VF-114, USS Kitty Hawk		North Vietnam, Gulf of Tonkin	Radar intercept officer on F-4B #152997 that suffered engine failure on launch, both crewmen ejected successfully but he drowned before SAR forces could arrive	Killed in action, body not recovered
May 9	Todd, Robert J	Private	USMC	2nd Battalion 3rd Marines	The Hill Fights	South Vietnam, Quảng Trị Province	Killed during an engagement with a PAVN force, his body was left behind as his unit withdrew	Killed in action, body not recovered
May 12	Ashlock, Carlos	Sergeant	USMC	1st Battalion 5th Marines	Operation Union	South Vietnam, Quảng Nam Province	Wounded during a Vietcong attack, he disappeared when his unit withdrew at dusk	Presumptive finding of death
May 12	Grenzebach, Earl W	Major	USAF	357th Tactical Fighter Squadron	Operation Rolling Thunder	North Vietnam	His F-105D #59-1728 was hit by enemy fire, he ejected but did not make contacted with SAR forces	Presumptive finding of death
May 12	Pitman, Peter P	Captain	USAF	34th Tactical Fighter Squadron	Operation Rolling Thunder	North Vietnam, Quảng Bình Province	Pilot of F-105F lost on a night interdiction mission	Presumptive finding of death
May 12	Stewart, Robert A	Major	USAF	34th Tactical Fighter Squadron	Operation Rolling Thunder	North Vietnam, Quảng Bình Province	Electronic warfare officer on F-105F lost on a night interdiction mission	Presumptive finding of death
May 15	Hill, Charles D	Seaman Apprentice	US Navy	USS Saint Paul		South Vietnam, South China Sea	Lost overboard	Killed in action, body not recovered
May 17	Lewis, Charlie G	Sergeant First Class	US Army	D Company, 16th Armor, 173rd Airborne Brigade		South Vietnam	Passenger in an M113 armored personnel carrier that hit a mine and caught fire, no recoverable remains	Killed in action, body not recovered
May 18	Delong, Joe L	Private First Class	US Army	1st Battalion, 8th Infantry Regiment		Cambodia, Ratanakiri Province	Captured after his platoon was overrun in a Vietcong ambush, other POWS report that he was shot while trying to escape on 6 November 1967	Died in captivity, remains not returned
May 19	Knight, Roy A	Major	USAF	602nd Air Commando Squadron	Operation Barrel Roll	Laos, Houaphanh Province	His A-1E was hit by enemy fire on an SAR mission, no ejection observed	Presumptive finding of death until 4 June 2019 when he was accounted for
May 19	Patterson, James K	Lieutenant	US Navy	VA-35, USS Enterprise	Operation Rolling Thunder	North Vietnam, Hải Dương Province	Bombardier/navigator on A-6A #152594 shot down on a night bombing mission, he ejected successfully but broke his leg on landing. He made contact with SAR forces and remained in contact for several days	Presumptive finding of death
May 20	Keefe, Douglas O	Private First Class	USMC	3rd Battalion 9th Marines	Operation Hickory	South Vietnam, Quảng Trị Province	Killed in an encounter with a Company size PACN force	Killed in action, body not recovered
May 20	Maddox, Notley G	Major	USAF	20th Tactical Reconnaissance Squadron	Operation Rolling Thunder	North Vietnam, Hanoi	Pilot of RF-101 #56-0120 shot down on a bomb damage assessment mission	Presumptive finding of death
May 21	Simpson, Walter S	Staff Sergeant	US Army	3rd Squadron, 11th Armored Cavalry Regiment		South Vietnam, Long Khánh province	His armored vehicle was on convoy escort when it was hit by Vietcong recoilless rifle fire and the vehicle caught fire. No recoverable remains	Killed in action, body not recovered
May 21	Wrobleski, Walter F	Warrant Officer	US Army	281st Assault Helicopter Company		South Vietnam, Quảng Nam Province	Pilot on UH-1C gunship #65-09480 hit by enemy fire, crashed and burned. The other 3 crewmen were rescued	Presumptive finding of death
May 22	Backus, Kenneth F	1st Lieutenant	USAF	497th Tactical Fighter Squadron	Operation Rolling Thunder	North Vietnam, Kép	Weapons system operator on F-4C #63-7692 hit by enemy fire and crashed. The remains of the pilot Capt Elton L Perrine were identified in May 2010	Presumptive finding of death
May 23	Homuth, Richard W	Lieutenant	US Navy	HS-2, USS Hornet		North Vietnam, Gulf of Tonkin	Pilot of SH-3A #148985 lost on an SAR mission	Killed in action, body not recovered
May 23	Pettis, Thomas E	Lieutenant (LTJG)	US Navy	HS-2, USS Hornet		North Vietnam, Gulf of Tonkin	Copilot of SH-3A #148985 lost on an SAR mission	Killed in action, body not recovered
May 23	Schmittou, Eureka L	Aircrew Survival Equipmentman 1st Class	US Navy	HS-2, USS Hornet		North Vietnam, Gulf of Tonkin	Crewman on SH-3A #148985 lost on an SAR mission	Killed in action, body not recovered
May 23	Soucy, Ronald P	Aviation Machinist 1st Class	US Navy	HS-2, USS Hornet		North Vietnam, Gulf of Tonkin	Crewman on SH-3A #148985 lost on an SAR mission	Killed in action, body not recovered
May 25	Graves, Richard C	Ensign	US Navy	VA-215, USS Bon Homme Richard	Operation Rolling Thunder	North Vietnam, Gulf of Tonkin	His A-1H was shot down while on a coastal armed reconnasissance mission, no ejection observed	Killed in action, body not recovered
May 29	Garner, John H	Hospital Corpsman 3rd Class	US Navy	H&S Company, 1st Battalion 1st Marines		South Vietnam	Passenger on a PBR returning from patrol, the PBR was hit by enemy fire and overturned and he is believed to have drowned	Killed in action, body not recovered
June 2	Wood, Rex S	Lieutenant Commander	US Navy	VF-24, USS Bon Homme Richard		North Vietnam, Gulf of Tonkin	His F-8C #147031 crashed at sea on a non-combat flight	Presumptive finding of death
June 3	Kearns, Joseph T	Captain	USAF	13th Bomb Squadron	Operation Rolling Thunder	North Vietnam, Quảng Bình Province	Navigator on B-57B #53-3862 lost on a night armed reconnaissance mission	Presumptive finding of death
June 3	Springston, Theodore	Major	USAF	13th Bomb Squadron	Operation Rolling Thunder	North Vietnam, Quảng Bình Province	Pilot of B-57B #53-3862 lost on a night armed reconnaissance mission	Presumptive finding of death
June 5	Ibanez, Di Reyes	Sergeant	USMC	Company A, 3rd Reconnaissance Battalion	Operation Crockett	South Vietnam, Khe Sanh	Disappeared at night while on a reconnaissance patrol north of Khe Sanh	Presumptive finding of death
June 7	Owens, Joy L	Major	USAF	11th Tactical Reconnaissance Squadron	Operation Barrel Roll	Laos, Xiangkhouang Province	Pilot of RF-4C lost on a night photo-reconnaissance mission	Presumptive finding of death
June 7	Sale, Harold R	1st Lieutenant	USAF	11th Tactical Reconnaissance Squadron	Operation Barrel Roll	Laos, Xiangkhouang Province	Navigator on RF-4C lost on a night photo-reconnaissance mission	Presumptive finding of death
June 8	Myers, David G	1st Lieutenant	USMC	VMO-3	Hill Fights	South Vietnam, Quảng Trị Province	Aircraft commander of UH-1E, killed by enemy AAA fire, the helicopter crashed and his body was unable to be recovered due to strong enemy presence	Killed in action, body not recovered
June 10	Platt, Robert L	Private First Class	US Army	2nd Battalion, 502nd Infantry Regiment		South Vietnam, Quảng Ngãi Province	Wounded when his patrol was ambushed he was left behind when his unit withdrew	Presumptive finding of death
June 11	Dexter, Ronald J	Sergeant First Class	US Army	FOB-1, CCN, MACV-SOG		Laos, Saravane Province	Member of a Hatchet Force inserted to attack road traffic. The unit was ambushed and was being extracted by CH-46 #150955 when the helicopter was shot down and crashed. He was last seen wounded in the wreckage and was reported to have been captured but died of his wounds on 29 July 1967	Died in captivity, remains not returned
June 11	Beecher, Quentin R	Warrant Officer	US Army	B Company, 227th Aviation Battalion		South Vietnam, South China Sea	Passenger on UH-1D #63-12958 lost at night in bad weather offshore of Bình Định Province	Presumptive finding of death
June 11	Clinton, Dean E	Warrant Officer	US Army	C Company, 227th Aviation Battalion		South Vietnam, South China Sea	Co-pilot of UH-1D #63-12958 lost at night in bad weather offshore of Bình Định Province	Presumptive finding of death
June 11	Nelson, James R	Specialist 5	US Army	C Company, 227th Aviation Battalion		South Vietnam, South China Sea	Crew chief on UH-1D #63-12958 lost at night in bad weather offshore of Bình Định Province	Presumptive finding of death
June 11	Riggs, Thomas F	Chief Warrant Officer	US Army	C Company, 227th Aviation Battalion		South Vietnam, South China Sea	Pilot of UH-1D #63-12958 lost at night in bad weather offshore of Bình Định Province	Presumptive finding of death
June 11	Uhlmansiek, Ralph E	Specialist	US Army	C Company, 227th Aviation Battalion		South Vietnam, South China Sea	Gunner on UH-1D #63-12958 lost at night in bad weather offshore of Bình Định Province	Presumptive finding of death
June 11	Bohlscheid, Curtis R	1st Lieutenant	USMC	HMM-265		South Vietnam, Quảng Trị Province	Pilot of CH-46A #150270 shot down from a height of 4–600 ft while inserting a 7-man Marine Reconnaissance team in the DMZ. SAR forces were unable to approach the wreckage due to strong enemy presence. The remains of passengers PFC James E Widener were identified in 2006 and CPL Jim E Moshier were identified in 2007.	Killed in action, body not recovered
June 11	Chomel, Charles D	Private First Class	USMC	3rd Force Reconnaissance Company		South Vietnam, Quảng Trị Province	Passenger on CH-46A #150270	Killed in action, body not recovered
June 11	Christie, Dennis R	Lance Corporal	USMC	3rd Force Reconnaissance Company		South Vietnam, Quảng Trị Province	Passenger on CH-46A #150270	Killed in action, body not recovered
June 11	Foley, John J	Lance Corporal	USMC	3rd Force Reconnaissance Company		South Vietnam, Quảng Trị Province	Passenger on CH-46A #150270	Killed in action, body not recovered
June 11	Gonzalez, Jose J	Lance Corporal	USMC	HMM-265		South Vietnam, Quảng Trị Province	Gunner on CH-46A #150270	Killed in action, body not recovered
June 11	Hanratty, Thomas M	Private First Class	USMC	HMM-265		South Vietnam, Quảng Trị Province	Crew chief on CH-46A #150270	Killed in action, body not recovered
June 11	Havranek, Michael W	Lance Corporal	USMC	3rd Force Reconnaissance Company		South Vietnam, Quảng Trị Province	Passenger on CH-46A #150270	Killed in action, body not recovered
June 11	Kooi, James W	Lance Corporal	USMC	3rd Force Reconnaissance Company		South Vietnam, Quảng Trị Province	Passenger on CH-46A #150270	Killed in action, body not recovered
June 11	Oldham, John S	Major	USMC	HMM-265		South Vietnam, Quảng Trị Province	Copilot of CH-46A #150270	Killed in action, body not recovered
June 11	Klemm, Donald M	Major	USAF	389th Tactical Fighter Squadron	Operation Rolling Thunder	North Vietnam	Pilot of F-4C #63-7706 that collided with F-4C #64-0786. The remains of the copilot 1LT Robert H Pearson were identified in 1988	Presumptive finding of death
June 15	Swanson, John W	Captain	USAF	34th Tactical Fighter Squadron	Operation Rolling Thunder	North Vietnam, Gulf of Tonkin	His F-105D was hit by AAA fire on a bombing mission near Dong Khe, he headed out to see where he ejected successfully but disappeared before SAR forces could arrive	Presumptive finding of death
June 18	Guillory, Edward J	Sergeant First Class	US Army	3rd Battalion 16th Artillery Regiment		South Vietnam, Quảng Tín Province	Passenger on an OH-23 that disappeared while on an artillery spotting mission	Presumptive finding of death
June 18	Lemmons, William E	Lieutenant	US Army	HHC, 196th Infantry Brigade (United States)		South Vietnam, Quảng Tín Province	Pilot of an OH-23 that disappeared while on an artillery spotting mission	Presumptive finding of death
June 18	McKittrick, James C	Major	US Army	3rd Battalion 16th Field Artillery Regiment (United States)		South Vietnam, Quảng Tín Province	Passenger on an OH-23 that disappeared while on an artillery spotting mission	Presumptive finding of death
June 30	Allen, Merlin R	Lance Corporal	USMC	A Company, 3rd Reconnaissance Battalion		South Vietnam, Thừa Thiên Province	Passenger on CH-46A #152515 hit by enemy fire, exploded and crashed	Listed as killed in action, body not recovered until February 2013 when his remains were identified
June 30	House, John A	Captain	USMC	HMM-265		South Vietnam, Thừa Thiên Province	Pilot of CH-46A #152515 hit by enemy fire, exploded and crashed	Killed in action, body not recovered until 10 April 2017 when his remains were identified
June 30	Killen, John D	Lance Corporal	USMC	A Company, 3rd Reconnaissance Battalion		South Vietnam, Thừa Thiên Province	Passenger on CH-46A #152515 hit by enemy fire, exploded and crashed	Killed in action, body not recovered until 10 April 2017 when his remains were identified
June 30	Judd, Michael B	Petty Officer Third Class	US Navy	A Company, 3rd Reconnaissance Battalion		South Vietnam, Thừa Thiên Province	Passenger on CH-46A #152515 hit by enemy fire, exploded and crashed	Listed as killed in action, body not recovered until February 2013 when his remains were identified
June 30	Runnels, Glyn L	Corporal	USMC	A Company, 3rd Reconnaissance Battalion		South Vietnam, Thừa Thiên Province	Passenger on CH-46A #152515 hit by enemy fire, exploded and crashed	Killed in action, body not recovered until 10 April 2017 when his remains were identified
June 30	Howard, Luther H	Specialist	US Army	2nd Battalion, 35th Field Artillery Regiment		South Vietnam, Long An Province	Drowned while swimming	Killed in action, body not recovered
July 2	Wilson, Wayne V	Sergeant	USMC	1st Battalion 9th Marines	Operation Buffalo (1967)	South Vietnam, Con Thien	Disappeared when his unit was ambushed	Presumptive finding of death
July 3	Seymour, Leo E	Staff Sergeant	US Army	RT Texas, MACV-SOG		Laos, Attapeu Province	Team leader disappeared following an engagement with enemy forces	Presumptive finding of death
July 7	Avolese, Paul A	Major	USAF	2d Bombardment Squadron	Operation Arc Light	South Vietnam, South China Sea	Navigator on B-52D #56-0627 which collided in middair with another B-52D #56-0595 offshore of Vĩnh Bình Province while en route to a target. Both aircraft crashed at sea.	Killed in action, body not recovered until 25 September 2020 when he was accounted for
July 7	Bittenbender, David F	Captain	USAF	2d Bombardment Squadron	Operation Arc Light	South Vietnam, South China Sea	Electronic warfare officer on B-52D #56-0627 which collided in middair with B-52D #56-0595 offshore of Vĩnh Bình Province	Killed in action, body not recovered
July 7	Crumm, William J	Major General	USAF	Commander, 3d Air Division	Operation Arc Light	South Vietnam, South China Sea	Observer on B-52D #56-0627 which collided in middair with B-52D #56-0595 offshore of Vĩnh Bình Province	Killed in action, body not recovered
July 7	McLaughlin, Olen B	Master Sergeant	USAF	736th Bombardment Squadron	Operation Arc Light	South Vietnam, South China Sea	Tail gunner on B-52D Tail #56-0595 that collided in midair with B-52D #56-0627 offshore of Vĩnh Bình Province	Killed in action, body not recovered
July 7	Tritt, James F	Machinist 2nd Class	US Navy	USS Bon Homme Richard		North Vietnam, Gulf of Tonkin	Lost overboard	Killed in action, body not recovered
July 12	Almendariz, Samuel	Sergeant First Class	US Army	FOB-1, CCN, MACV-SOG		Laos, Savannakhet Province	Team leader mortally wounded when his reconnaissance team was ambushed and left behind as the team dispersed	Killed in action, body not recovered
July 12	Sullivan, Robert J	Sergeant First Class	US Army	FOB-1, CCN, MACV-SOG		Laos, Savannakhet Province	Assistant team leader mortally wounded when his reconnaissance team was ambushed and left behind as the team dispersed	Killed in action, body not recovered
July 12	Van Bendegom, James L	Private First Class	US Army	1st Battalion, 12th Infantry Regiment		South Vietnam, Pleiku Province	Wounded during a patrol and captured when his position was overrun, he later died from his wounds at a PAVN hospital in Cambodia	Listed as died in captivity, remains not returned until 17 October 2014 when his remains were identified
July 15	Cassell, Robin B	Lieutenant (LTJG)	US Navy	VA-152, USS Oriskany	Operation Rolling Thunder	North Vietnam, Gulf of Tonkin	His A-1H was hit by enemy fire while attacking vessels and crashed into the sea	Killed in action, body not recovered
July 25	Jarvis, Jeremy M	1st Lieutenant	USAF	390th Tactical Fighter Squadron	Operation Rolling Thunder	North Vietnam, Gulf of Tonkin	Weapons system operator on F-4C shot down and crashed at sea offshore of Quảng Bình Province	Presumptive finding of death
July 25	Lunsford, Herbert L	Major	USAF	390th Tactical Fighter Squadron	Operation Rolling Thunder	North Vietnam, Gulf of Tonkin	Pilot of F-4C shot down and crashed at sea offshore of Quảng Bình Province	Presumptive finding of death
July 26	Brazik, Richard A	1st Lieutenant	USAF	433rd Tactical Fighter Squadron	Operation Rolling Thunder	North Vietnam, Quảng Bình Province	Weapons system operator on F-4C #64‑0848 that crashed after a premature ordnance explosion while on a night armed reconnaissance mission	Presumptive finding of death
July 26	Claflin, Richard A	Captain	USAF	433rd Tactical Fighter Squadron	Operation Rolling Thunder	North Vietnam, Quảng Bình Province	Pilot of F-4C #64‑0848 that crashed after a premature ordnance explosion while on a night armed reconnaissance mission	Presumptive finding of death
July 27	Bare, William O	1st Lieutenant	USAF	16th Tactical Reconnaissance Squadron	Operation Rolling Thunder	North Vietnam, Quảng Bình Province	Weapons system operator on RF-4C #64‑1042 shot down on a photo-reconnaissance mission	Presumptive finding of death
July 27	Corbitt, Gilland W	Major	USAF	16th Tactical Reconnaissance Squadron	Operation Rolling Thunder	North Vietnam, Quảng Bình Province	Pilot of RF-4C #64‑1042 shot down on a photo-reconnaissance mission	Presumptive finding of death
July 27	Hardie, Charles D	Aviation Electrician 2nd Class	US Navy	VAH-4, USS Oriskany		South Vietnam, South China Sea	Crewman on KA-3H that suffered mechanical failure, all crewmen escaped the plane successfully but he disappeared before he could be rescued	Killed in action, body not recovered
July 27	Patterson, Bruce M	Ensign	US Navy	VAH-4, USS Oriskany		South Vietnam	Crewman on KA-3H that suffered mechanical failure, all crewmen escaped the plane successfully but he disappeared before he could be rescued	Killed in action, body not recovered
July 29	Bennefield, Steven H	Private First Class	USMC	2nd Battalion 9th Marines	Operation Kingfisher	South Vietnam, Con Thien	Shot and wounded during an engagement with PAVN forces, he was left behind as his unit withdrew	Killed in action, body not recovered
July 29	Johnson, Richard H	Private First Class	USMC	2nd Battalion 9th Marines	Operation Kingfisher	South Vietnam, Con Thien	Disappeared during an engagement with PAVN forces	Killed in action, body not recovered
August 1	Prewitt, William R	Private First Class	USMC	CAP-6, HQ Battalion, 3rd Marine Division		South Vietnam, Thừa Thiên Province	Shot and killed during an engagement with PAVN forces when he and two others were separated from their patrol	Killed in action, body not recovered
August 2	Hynds, Wallace G	Colonel	USAF	HQ Squadron, 432nd Tactical Reconnaissance Wing	Operation Rolling Thunder	North Vietnam	Pilot of RF-4C that crashed on a two aircraft daytime photo-reconnaissance mission, no ejection observed. In 1998 the remains of the weapons system operator, Captain Carey Cunningham were identified	Killed in action, body not recovered
August 6	Kemmerer, Donald R	Captain	USAF	390th Tactical Fighter Squadron	Operation Rolling Thunder	North Vietnam, Gulf of Tonkin	Weapons system operator of F-4C #64-0752 hit by enemy fire and crashed offshore Quảng Bình Province, no ejection observed	Presumptive finding of death
August 6	Page, Albert L	Captain	USAF	390th Tactical Fighter Squadron	Operation Rolling Thunder	North Vietnam, Gulf of Tonkin	Pilot of F-4C #64-0752 hit by enemy fire and crashed offshore Quảng Bình Province, no ejection observed	Presumptive finding of death
August 11	Berube, Kenneth A	1st Lieutenant	USMC	VMA-211		South Vietnam, Chu Lai	His A-4E #151088 was hit by enemy fire and crashed	Killed in action, body not recovered
August 17	Dion, Laurent N	Commander	US Navy	RVAH-12, USS Constellation	Operation Rolling Thunder	North Vietnam, Gulf of Tonkin	Pilot of RA-5C #149302 that crashed at sea on a coastal reconnaissance mission	Killed in action, body not recovered
August 17	Hom, Charles D	Lieutenant (LTJG)	US Navy	RVAH-12, USS Constellation	Operation Rolling Thunder	North Vietnam, Gulf of Tonkin	Radar intercept officer on RA-5C #149302 that crashed at sea on a coastal reconnaissance mission	Killed in action, body not recovered
August 21	Eby, Robert G	Civilian				South Vietnam, South China Sea	Passenger on a C-47 that crashed off the coast	Presumptive finding of death
August 21	Scott, Dain V	Lieutenant (LTJG)	US Navy	VA-196, USS Constellation	Operation Rolling Thunder	China	Bombardier/navigator on A-6A #152627 last seen being pursued by Migs towards the Chinese border. In 2005 the remains of the pilot LCDR Forrest Trembley were identified.	Presumptive finding of death
August 22	Kerr, John C	Major	USAF	606th Air Commando Squadron	Operation Barrel Roll	Laos, Plain of Jars	Pilot of A-26A that disappeared on an armed reconnaissance mission. The remains of the navigator Capt Burke Morgan were identified in 2006.	Killed in action, body not recovered until 24 April 2024 when he was accounted for
August 23	Lane, Charles	1st Lieutenant	USAF	555th Tactical Fighter Squadron	Operation Rolling Thunder	North Vietnam, Thái Nguyên province	Weapons system operator on F-4D #66-0247 shot down by a VNAF MiG-21 on a daytime strike mission. The pilot Captain Larry Carrigan ejected successfully and was captured	Presumptive finding of death
August 23	Midnight, Francis B	1st Lieutenant	USAF	435th Tactical Fighter Squadron	Operation Rolling Thunder	North Vietnam, Quảng Bình Province	Pilot of F-4D 66-7517 hit by enemy fire and crashed. The weapons system operator 1LT A.M. Silva ejected successfully and was rescued	Presumptive finding of death
August 24	Allard, Richard M	Specialist	US Army	119th Assault Helicopter Company		South Vietnam, Kon Tum Province	Crew chief on UH-1C #66-12526 that crashed into a river due to a downdraft His mother claimed to have visited him in a POW camp in Cambodia in January 1972	Presumptive finding of death
August 24	Goff, Kenneth B	1st Lieutenant	US Army	1st Battalion, 8th Infantry Regiment		South Vietnam, Kon Tum Province	Passenger on UH-1C #66-12526 that crashed into a river	Presumptive finding of death
August 24	Holtzman, Ronald L	Specialist	US Army	119th Assault Helicopter Company		South Vietnam, Kon Tum Province	Door gunner on UH-1C #66-12526 that crashed into a river	Killed in action, body not recovered
August 24	Schell, Richard J	Captain	US Army	HHC, 4th Infantry Division		South Vietnam, Kon Tum Province	Passenger on UH-1C #66-12526 that crashed into a river	Presumptive finding of death
August 25	Boisclaire, Ronald A	Aviation Machinist 2nd Class	US Navy	VAP-62	Operation Rolling Thunder	North Vietnam, Gulf of Tonkin	RA-3B #144835 that disappeared on a night reconnaissance mission	Killed in action, body not recovered
August 25	Jacobs, Edward J	Commander	US Navy	VAP-62	Operation Rolling Thunder	North Vietnam, Gulf of Tonkin	Pilot of RA-3B #144835 that disappeared on a night reconnaissance mission	Killed in action, body not recovered
August 25	Zavocky, James J	Lieutenant (LTJG)	US Navy	VAP-62	Operation Rolling Thunder	North Vietnam	Copilot of RA-3B #144835 that disappeared on a night reconnaissance mission	Killed in action, body not recovered
August 26	Fuller, William O	Captain	USAF	558th Tactical Fighter Squadron	Operation Rolling Thunder	North Vietnam	Pilot of F-4C #64-0692 hit by enemy fire	Presumptive finding of death
August 26	Kilcullen, Thomas M	1st Lieutenant	USAF	558th Tactical Fighter Squadron	Operation Rolling Thunder	North Vietnam	Weapons system operator on F-4C #64-0692 hit by enemy fire	Presumptive finding of death
August 27	Bacik, Vladimir H	Major	USMC	VMA-533	Operation Rolling Thunder	North Vietnam, Gulf of Tonkin	Pilot of A-6A #152639 that disappeared while on a night strike mission offshore Quảng Ninh Province	Presumptive finding of death
August 27	Boggs, Paschal G	Captain	USMC	VMA-533	Operation Rolling Thunder	North Vietnam, Gulf of Tonkin	Bombardier/naviagtor of A-6A #152639 that disappeared while on a night strike mission offshore Quảng Ninh Province	Presumptive finding of death
August 28	Wallace, Charles F	Major	USMC	VMA-121	Operation Rolling Thunder	North Vietnam, Quảng Bình Province	His A-4E #150038 was shot down north of the DMZ	Killed in action, body not recovered
August 29	Newburn, Larry S	Private First Class	US Army	4th Battalion, 39th Infantry Regiment		South Vietnam, Biên Hòa Province	Drowned while on patrol	Killed in action, body not recovered
September 1	Johnson, Robert D	Lieutenant Commander	US Navy	HAL-3		South Vietnam, Vĩnh Long Province	Pilot of UH-1H #63-8570 that crashed into the Bassac River after takeoff from the USS Garrett County	Killed in action, body not recovered
September 1	Ott, Edward L	Aviation Machinist 1st Class	US Navy	HAL-3		South Vietnam, Vĩnh Long Province	Crewman on UH-1H #63-8570 that crashed into the Bassac River after takeoff from the USS Garrett County	Killed in action, body not recovered
September 2	Bennett, William G	Major	USAF	333rd Tactical Fighter Squadron	Operation Rolling Thunder	North Vietnam, Quảng Bình Province	His F-105D crashed into the ground on a strafing run, no ejection observed	Presumptive finding of death
September 3	Moore, Herbert W	Captain	USAF	469th Tactical Fighter Squadron	Operation Rolling Thunder	North Vietnam, Quảng Bình Province	His F-105D #61-0078 was hit by enemy fire and he ejected successfully but failed to make contact with SAR forces	Presumptive finding of death
September 5	Downing, Donald W	Captain	USAF	557th Tactical Fighter Squadron	Operation Rolling Thunder	North Vietnam, Quảng Bình Province	Weapons system operator on F-4C #63-7547 shot down on a bombing mission	Presumptive finding of death until 20 December 2024 when he was accounted for
September 5	Raymond, Paul D	1st Lieutenant	USAF	557th Tactical Fighter Squadron	Operation Rolling Thunder	North Vietnam, Quảng Bình Province	Pilot of F-4C #63-7547 shot down on a bombing mission	Presumptive finding of death
September 5	Hanson, Thomas P	1st Lieutenant	USAF	555th Tactical Fighter Squadron	Operation Rolling Thunder	North Vietnam	Weapons system operator on F-4C #65-0723 that failed to pull out of a rocket run	Presumptive finding of death
September 5	Miller, Carl D	Major	USAF	555th Tactical Fighter Squadron	Operation Rolling Thunder	North Vietnam	Pilot of F-4C #65-0723 that failed to pull out of a rocket run	Presumptive finding of death
September 5	Laporte, Michael L	Hospital Corpsman, 2nd Class	US Navy	1st Force Reconnaissance Company		South Vietnam, Quảng Nam Province	Hospital corpsman in a 9-man reconnaissance team being inserted by parachute into Happy Valley, his parachute was blown away from the group and he disappeared	Presumptive finding of death
September 5	Prather, Martin W	Private First Class	USMC	3rd Reconnaissance Battalion		South Vietnam, Quảng Trị Province	Shot and killed while ambushing a Vietcong unit, his body was left behind when his team evacuated	Killed in action, body not recovered
September 11	Anspach, Robert A	Sergeant First Class	US Army	Detachment A-401, 5th Special Forces Group		South Vietnam, Đồng Tháp Province	Killed when the airboat he was riding on was hit by enemy machine gun fire while patrolling near the Cambodian border	Killed in action, body not recovered
September 12	Hawthorne, Richard W	Major	USMC	VMCJ-1		South Vietnam, Quảng Nam Province	Pilot of RF-4B #153104	Presumptive finding of death
September 12	Kane, Richard R	Captain	USMC	VMCJ-1		South Vietnam, Quảng Nam Province	Weapons system operator on RF-4B #153104	Presumptive finding of death
September 17	Grubb, Peter A	1st Lieutenant	USAF	12th Tactical Reconnaissance Squadron	Operation Rolling Thunder	North Vietnam, Quảng Bình Province	Weapons system operator on RF-4C #64-1037 that disappeared on a night photo reconnaissance mission	Presumptive finding of death
September 17	Nellans, William L	Captain	USAF	12th Tactical Reconnaissance Squadron	Operation Rolling Thunder	North Vietnam, Quảng Bình Province	Pilot of RF-4C #64-1037 that disappeared on a night photo reconnaissance mission	Presumptive finding of death
September 26	Huddleston, Lynn R	1st Lieutenant	US Army	74th Aviation Company		South Vietnam, Tây Ninh Province	Pilot of O-1D that disappeared on a daytime visual reconnasiisance mission along the Cambodian border	Presumptive finding of death
September 26	Geist, Stephen J	Staff Sergeant	US Army	Detachment A-332, 5th Special Forces Group		South Vietnam	Observer on an O-1D that disappeared on a daytime visual reconnasiisance mission along the Cambodian border	Presumptive finding of death
September 26	Moe, Harold J	1st Lieutenant	USMC	Marine Aviation Logistics Squadron 13		South Vietnam, Chu Lai	Passenger on F-4B #148422 hit by ground fire	Killed in action, body not recovered
September 28	Graham, Gilbert J	Seaman	US Navy	PBR-100, TF116	Operation Game Warden	South Vietnam, Vĩnh Long	Crewman on PBR-100 hit by enemy rockets while on river patrol, the boat caught fire and exploded. No recoverable remains	Killed in action, body not recovered
September 28	Musetti, Joseph T	Engineman 2nd Class	US Navy	PBR-100, TF-116	Operation Game Warden	South Vietnam, Vĩnh Long	Crewman on PBR-100 hit by enemy rockets while on river patrol, the boat caught fire and exploded. No recoverable remains	Killed in action, body not recovered
October 2	Ott, Patrick L	1st Lieutenant	USMC	VMFA-235		South Vietnam, Quảng Nam Province	His F-8E #150912 crashed into a mountain	Killed in action, body not recovered
October 3	King, Ronald R	Major	USAF	333rd Tactical Fighter Squadron	Operation Rolling Thunder	North Vietnam	His F-105D #59-01824 caught fire, he ejected successfully over water but drowned after becoming entangled in his parachute	Killed in action, body not recovered
October 4	Lillund, William A	Captain	USAF	13th Tactical Fighter Squadron	Operation Rolling Thunder	North Vietnam, Vĩnh Phúc Province	Weapons system operator on F-105F that disappeared on a Wild Weasel mission	Presumptive finding of death
October 4	McDaniel, Morris L	Major	USAF	13th Tactical Fighter Squadron	Operation Rolling Thunder	North Vietnam, Vĩnh Phúc Province	Pilot of F-105F that disappeared on a Wild Weasel mission	Presumptive finding of death
October 6	Armstrong, Frank A	Major	USAF	1st Air Commando Squadron	Operation Steel Tiger	Laos, Attapeu Province	His A-1E #52-132663 was hit by enemy fire and crashed inverted, no ejection observed	Killed in action, body not recovered
October 8	Guerra, Raul A	Journalist 3rd Class	US Navy	VAW-111, USS Oriskany		South Vietnam, Thừa Thiên Province	Passenger on E-1B #148132 that crashed into a mountain near Da Nang. In 2007 the remains of the other 4 crewmen were identified	Killed in action, body not recovered until 20 February 2019 when he was accounted for
October 12	Derrickson, Thomas G	Captain	USAF	557th Tactical Fighter Squadron	Operation Rolling Thunder	North Vietnam, Quảng Bình Province	Pilot of F-4C that crashed while attacking targets during an armed reconnaissance mission, no ejection observed	Presumptive finding of death
October 12	Hardy, John K	1st Lieutenant	USAF	557th Tactical Fighter Squadron	Operation Rolling Thunder	North Vietnam, Quảng Bình Province	Weapons system operator on F-4C that crashed while attacking targets during an armed reconnaissance mission, no ejection observed	Presumptive finding of death
October 14	Vaughan, Robert R	Lieutenant Commander	US Navy	VAP-61	Operation Rolling Thunder	North Vietnam, Gulf of Tonkin	Pilot of RA-3B hit by enemy fire while on a coastal reconnaissance mission, he flew out to sea and the other two crewmen bailed out successfully and were rescued	Killed in action, body not recovered
October 16	Appelhans, Richard D	Captain	USAF	12th Tactical Reconnaissance Squadron	Operation Steel Tiger	Laos, Salavan Province	Pilot of RF-4C #65-0855 that disappeared on a night reconnaissance mission	Presumptive finding of death
October 16	Clarke, George W	Captain	USAF	12th Tactical Reconnaissance Squadron	Operation Steel Tiger	Laos, Salavan Province	Weapons system operator on RF-4C #65-0855 that disappeared on a night reconnaissance mission	Presumptive finding of death
October 17	Cadwell, Anthony B	Private	US Army	188th Maintenance Battalion		South Vietnam, Quảng Tín Province	Drowned while swimming	Killed in action, body not recovered
October 17	Fitzgerald, Paul L	Specialist	US Army	2nd Battalion, 28th Infantry Regiment		South Vietnam, Bình Long Province	Rifleman on a search and destroy mission disappeared when his unit withdrew after engaging enemy forces	Presumptive finding of death
October 17	Hargrove, Olin	Privated First Class	US Army	2nd Battalion, 28th Infantry Regiment		South Vietnam, Bình Long Province	Rifleman on a search and destroy mission, wounded and disappeared when his unit withdrew after engaging enemy forces	Presumptive finding of death
October 18	Ogden, Howard	Lance Corporal	USMC	2nd Battalion 7th Marines		South Vietnam, Thừa Thiên Province	Mortally wounded and left behind as his unit assisted in extracting a reconnaissance team	Killed in action, body not recovered
October 21	Hemmel, Clarence J	Captain	USAF	612th Tactical Fighter Squadron		South Vietnam, South China Sea	His F-100 #56-2965 was hit by enemy fire on a close air support mission and crashed at sea east of Tam Ky	Killed in action, body not recovered
October 22	Dooley, James E	Lieutenant (LTJG)	US Navy	VA-163, USS Oriskany	Operation Rolling Thunder	North Vietnam, Gulf of Tonkin	His A-4E #150116 was hit by a SAM and crashed at sea offshore of Haiphong, no ejection observed	Presumptive finding of death
October 24	Clark, Richard C	Lieutenant (LTJG)	US Navy	VF-151, USS Coral Sea	Operation Rolling Thunder	North Vietnam, Phuc Yen	Radar intercept officer on F-4B #150421 hit by a SAM, both crewmen ejected successfully, the pilot Commander Charles R. Gillespie was captured	Presumptive finding of death
October 25	Krommenhoek, Jeffrey M	Lieutenant	US Navy	VA-163, USS Oriskany	Operation Rolling Thunder	North Vietnam, Haiphong	His A-4E #150086 was hit by enemy fire, no ejection observed	Presumptive finding of death
November 2	Knapp, Frederic W	Lieutenant (LTJG)	US Navy	VA-164, USS Oriskany	Operation Rolling Thunder	North Vietnam, Nghệ An Province	His A-4E #151985 was hit by enemy fire on an armed reconnaissance mission, no ejection observed	Killed in action, body not recovered
November 3	Grauert, Hans H	Lieutenant (LTJG)	US Navy	VAH-8, USS Constellation		North Vietnam, Gulf of Tonkin	Copilot of KA-3B that crashed into the sea after a night launch	Killed in action, body not recovered
November 3	Krusi, Peter H	Lieutenant Commander	US Navy	VAH-8, USS Constellation		North Vietnam, Gulf of Tonkin	Pilot of KA-3B that crashed into the sea after a night launch	Killed in action, body not recovered
November 8	Adams, John R	Specialist 5	US Army	189th Assault Helicopter Company		Laos, Attapeu Province	Crew chief on UH-1C #66-00695 that crash landed, the crew was engaged by enemy forces and he was left behind wounded as the crew evacuated. The crash site was subsequently bombed to destroy sensitive equipment	Presumptive finding of death
November 8	Hines, Vaughn M	Private First Class	US Army	244th Aviation Company		South Vietnam, South China Sea	Observer on OV-1C #60-3746 that crashed at sea offshore of An Xuyen province on a low-level reconnaissance mission. The remains of the pilot Maj. Lawrence C. Suttlehan were recovered	Killed in action, body not recovered
November 9	Armstrong, John W	Lieutenant Colonel	USAF	480th Tactical Fighter Squadron	Operation Steel Tiger	Laos, Khammouane Province	Pilot of F-4C #64-0751 that crashed due to exploding ordnance. The weapons system operator 1Lt Lance Sijan ejected successfully but died in captivity in January 1968	Presumptive finding of death
November 9	Baxter, Bruce R	Master Sergeant	US Army	FOB-1, CCC, MACV-SOG		Laos, Savannakhet Province	Member of a 12-man reconnaissance team evacuated by HH-3E #66-13279 when it was hit by enemy fire, crashed and caught fire. His remains were located by SAR forces but could not be removed due to enemy fire	Killed in action, body not recovered
November 9	Brower, Ralph W	Captain	USAF	37th Aerospace Rescue and Recovery Squadron		Laos, Savannakhet Province	Copilot of HH-3E #66-13279 hit by enemy fire, crashed and caught fire. No recoverable remains	Killed in action, body not recovered
November 9	Clay, Eugene L	Staff Sergeant	USAF	37th Aerospace Rescue and Recovery Squadron		Laos, Savannakhet Province	Flight engineer on HH-3E #66-13279 hit by enemy fire, crashed and caught fire. No recoverable remains	Killed in action, body not recovered
November 9	Kusick, Joseph G	Sergeant	US Army	CCC, MACV-SOG		Laos, Savannakhet Province	Member of a 12-man reconnaissance team evacuated by HH-3E #66-13279 when it was hit by enemy fire, crashed and caught fire. His remains were located by SAR forces but could not be removed due to enemy fire	Killed in action, body not recovered
November 9	Maysey, Larry W	Sergeant	USAF	37th Aerospace Rescue and Recovery Squadron		Laos, Savannakhet Province	Pararescueman on HH-3E #66-13279 hit by enemy fire, crashed and caught fire. No recoverable remains	Killed in action, body not recovered
November 9	Rehn, Gary L	Corporal	USMC	D Company, 3rd Reconnaissance Battalion		South Vietnam, Thừa Thiên Province	Shot while on patrol	Killed in action, body not recovered
November 10	Cook, Kelly F	Lieutenant Colonel	USAF	366th Tactical Fighter Wing	Operation Rolling Thunder	North Vietnam, Quảng Bình Province	Pilot of F-4C #64-0834 that crashed on a two aircraft night strike mission	Presumptive finding of death
November 10	Crew, James A	1st Lieutenant	USAF	389th Tactical Fighter Squadron	Operation Rolling Thunder	North Vietnam, Quảng Bình Province	Weapons system operator on F-4C #64-0834 that crashed on a two aircraft night strike mission	Presumptive finding of death
November 10	Morgan, James S	Major	USAF	389th Tactical Fighter Squadron	Operation Rolling Thunder	North Vietnam, Quảng Bình Province	Pilot of F-4C #64-0669 that crashed on a two aircraft night strike mission. The remains of the weapons system operator 1Lt Charles J. Huneycutt were returned in 1988	Presumptive finding of death
November 11	Martinez-Mercado, Edwin	Private First Class	US Army	1st Battalion, 503rd Infantry Regiment	Battle of Dak To	South Vietnam, Kon Tum Province	Killed by enemy fire while on patrol, his body was left behind as his unit was extracted by helicopter	Killed in action, body not recovered
November 11	Shaw, Gary F	Private First Class	US Army	3rd Battalion, 319th Field Artillery Regiment	Battle of Dak To	South Vietnam, Kon Tum Province	Killed by enemy fire while on patrol, his body was left behind as his unit was extracted by helicopter	Killed in action, body not recovered
November 11	Staton, Robert M	Specialist	US Army	1st Battalion, 503rd Infantry Regiment	Battle of Dak To	South Vietnam, Kon Tum Province	Killed by enemy fire while on patrol, his body was left behind as his unit was extracted by helicopter	Killed in action, body not recovered
November 11	Stuckey, John S	Private	US Army	1st Platoon, 173rd Engineering Company	Battle of Dak To	South Vietnam, Kon Tum Province	Killed by enemy fire while on patrol, his body was left behind as his unit was extracted by helicopter	Killed in action, body not recovered
November 12	Cayce, John D	Seaman	US Navy	USS William V. Pratt		North Vietnam, Gulf of Tonkin	Lost overboard while on helicopter detail	Killed in action, body not recovered
November 12	Roark, James D	Shipfitter 2nd Class	US Navy	USS William V. Pratt		North Vietnam, Gulf of Tonkin	Lost overboard while on helicopter detail	Killed in action, body not recovered
November 14	Kmetyk, Jonathan P	Lance Corporal	USMC	C Company, 1st Reconnaissance Battalion		South Vietnam, Quảng Nam Province	Shot and killed on a reconnaissance patrol, his body was left behind as his team evacuated	Killed in action, body not recovered
November 19	Croxdale, Jack L	Specialist 4	US Army	2nd Battalion, 503rd Infantry Regiment	Battle of Dak To	South Vietnam, Kon Tum Province	Killed by friendly fire when his position was bombed, his body later disappeared en route to a mortuary unit	Killed in action, body not recovered
November 19	DeHerrera, Benjamin D	Private First Class	US Army	2nd Battalion, 503rd Infantry Regiment	Battle of Dak To	South Vietnam, Kon Tum Province	Killed by friendly fire, his body later disappeared en route to a mortuary unit	Killed in action, body not recovered
November 19	Iandoli, Donald	Sergeant	US Army	2nd Battalion, 503rd Infantry Regiment	Battle of Dak To	South Vietnam, Kon Tum Province	Killed by friendly fire, his body later disappeared en route to a mortuary unit	Killed in action, body not recovered
November 20	Martin, John M	Captain	USAF	480th Tactical Fighter Squadron	Operation Rolling Thunder	North Vietnam, Gulf of Tonkin	Pilot of F-4C #63-7680 hit by enemy fire near Vinh and headed out to sea, he was not seen to eject from the aircraft. The weapons system operator 1Lt James Badley ejected successfully and was rescued	Presumptive finding of death
November 21	Reynolds, David R	Private First Class	US Army	4th Battalion, 503rd Infantry Regiment	Battle of Dak To	South Vietnam, Kon Tum Province		Killed in action, body not recovered
November 24	Foley, Brendan P	Major	USAF	11th Tactical Reconnaissance Squadron	Operation Rolling Thunder	North Vietnam	Pilot of RF-4C #65-0844 that disappeared on a night reconnaissance mission	Presumptive finding of death
November 24	Mayercik, Ronald M	1st Lieutenant	USAF	11th Tactical Reconnaissance Squadron	Operation Rolling Thunder	North Vietnam	Weapons system operator on RF-4C #65-0844 that disappeared on a night reconnaissance mission	Presumptive finding of death
November 25	Midgett, Dewey A	Private	US Army	355th Assault Helicopter Company		South Vietnam, Khánh Hòa Province	Disappeared while on a day pass	Presumptive finding of death
November 25	Searfus, William H	Commander	US Navy	VA-155, USS Coral Sea		North Vietnam, Gulf of Tonkin	His A-4E #150037 was blown off the carrier by jet blast from a taxiing F-4	Killed in action, body not recovered
November 26	Brennan, Herbert O	Colonel	USAF	390th Tactical Fighter Squadron	Operation Rolling Thunder	North Vietnam, Quảng Bình Province	Pilot of F-4C #64-0697 downed by exploding ordnance on a daytime strike mission. The remains of the copilot 1Lt Douglas C. Condit were returned in June 1992	Presumptive finding of death
November 29	Millner, Michael	Staff Sergeant	US Army	Detachment A-341, 5th Special Forces Group		South Vietnam, Phước Long Province	Disappeared when the CIDG patrol he was advising was ambushed	Presumptive finding of death
December 4	Collins, Arnold	Corporal	USMC	2nd Battalion 7th Marines		South Vietnam, Thừa Thiên Province	Drowned	Killed in action, body not recovered
December 6	Pastva, Michael J	Lance Corporal	USMC	1st Battalion, 4th Marines		South Vietnam, Quảng Trị Province	Killed by friendly fire when a bomb hit his position, no recoverable remains	Killed in action, body not recovered
December 12	Grzyb, Robert H	Civilian				Cambodia	Captured while riding in a jeep near Pleiku, he subsequently died in a prisoner of war camp in Cambodia	Died in captivity, remains not returned
December 21	Scurlock, Lee D	Staff Sergeant	US Army	MACV-SOG		Laos, Attapeu Province	Radio operator in a 6-man reconnaissance team that was ambushed, his team was being extracted by helicopter when he fell from a ladder from a height of 50 ft as the helicopter evaded ground fire	Presumptive finding of death
December 22	Fors, Gary H	Captain	USMC	VMFA-122	Operation Steel Tiger	Laos	Pilot of F-4B #148388 that was hit by enemy fire. The radar intercept officer 1Lt Guy K Lashlee ejected successfully and was rescued	Presumptive finding of death
December 24	Powers, Vernie H	Private First Class	US Army	3rd Battalion, 12th Infantry Regiment		South Vietnam, Kon Tum Province	Shot and killed while on patrol near Dak To, his body was left behind as his platoon was forced to withdraw	Killed in action, body not recovered
December 25	Koonce, Terry T	Captain	USAF	606th Air Commando Squadron	Operation Steel Tiger	Laos, Khammouane Province	Pilot of a Royal Lao Air Force T-28 #49-1558 hit by ground fire and crashed	Presumptive finding of death
December 27	Martin, Sammy A	1st Lieutenant	USAF	390th Tactical Fighter Squadron	Operation Rolling Thunder	North Vietnam, Gulf of Tonkin	Weapons system operator on F-4C #63-7489 hit by enemy fire on armed reconnaissance mission over Quảng Bình Province, both crewmen ejected over water. He was located by a rescue helicopter, but fell from the rescue sling and drowned	Killed in action, body not recovered
December 30	Swords, Smith	Major	USAF	480th Tactical Fighter Squadron	Operation Steel Tiger	Laos, Khammouane Province	Pilot of F-4C #63-7658 that crashed on a night strike mission	Presumptive finding of death
December 30	Wortham, Murray L	1st Lieutenant	USAF	480th Tactical Fighter Squadron	Operation Steel Tiger	Laos, Khammouane Province	Weapons system operator on F-4C #63-7658 that crashed on a night strike mission	Presumptive finding of death
December 31	Peace, John D	Lieutenant Commander	US Navy	VA-75, USS Kitty Hawk	Operation Rolling Thunder	North Vietnam, Vinh	Pilot of A-6A #152917 that disappeared on a daytime strike mission	Presumptive finding of death
December 31	Perisho, Gordon S	Lieutenant	US Navy	VA-75, USS Kitty Hawk	Operation Rolling Thunder	North Vietnam, Vinh	Bombardier/Navigator on A-6A #152917 that disappeared on a daytime strike mission	Presumptive finding of death

== See also ==
- List of United States servicemembers and civilians missing in action during the Vietnam War (1961–65)
- List of United States servicemembers and civilians missing in action during the Vietnam War (1968–69)
- List of United States servicemembers and civilians missing in action during the Vietnam War (1970–71)
- List of United States servicemembers and civilians missing in action during the Vietnam War (1972–75)
- Vietnam War POW/MIA issue
- Joint POW/MIA Accounting Command
- Defense Prisoner of War/Missing Personnel Office
- Defense POW/MIA Accounting Agency
