= VAH-8 =

Heavy Attack Squadron 8
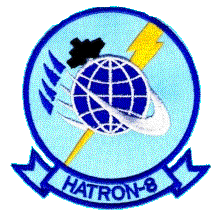
- VAH-8 squadron patch
- Active: 1 May 1957 – 17 January 1968
- Country: United States
- Branch: United States Navy
- Role: Attack
- Part of: Inactive
- Nickname(s): Fireballers

Aircraft flown
- Attack: A-3B/KA-3B Skywarrior

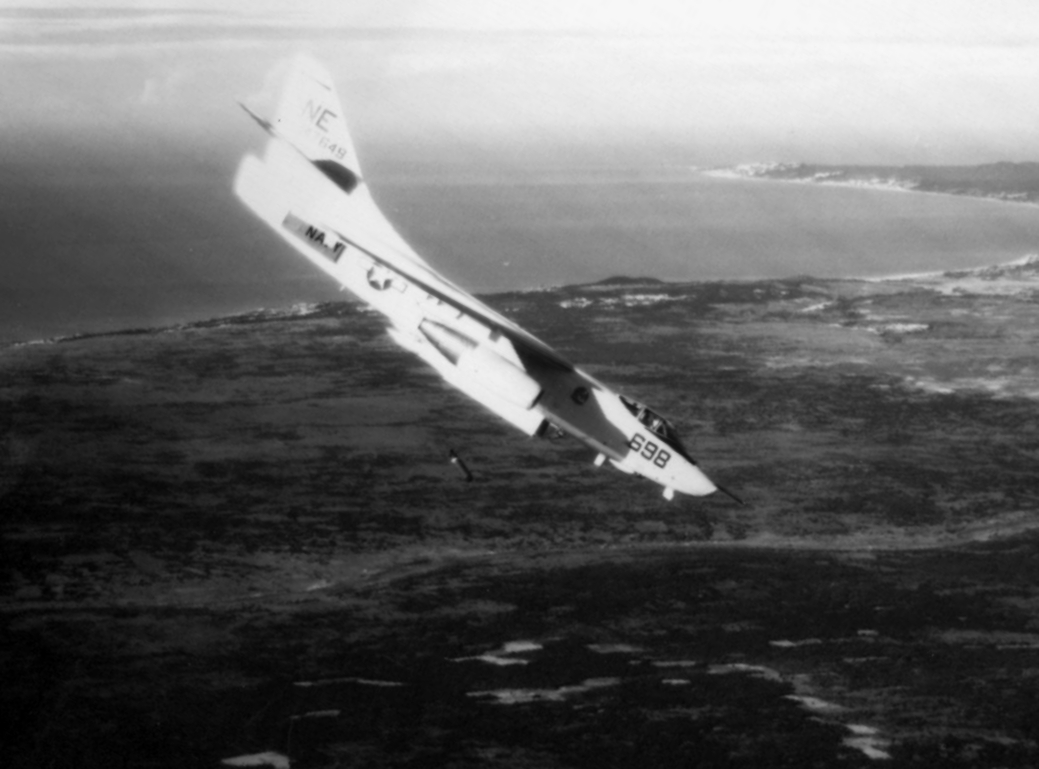
VAH-8 A-3B bombing North Vietnam in 1965

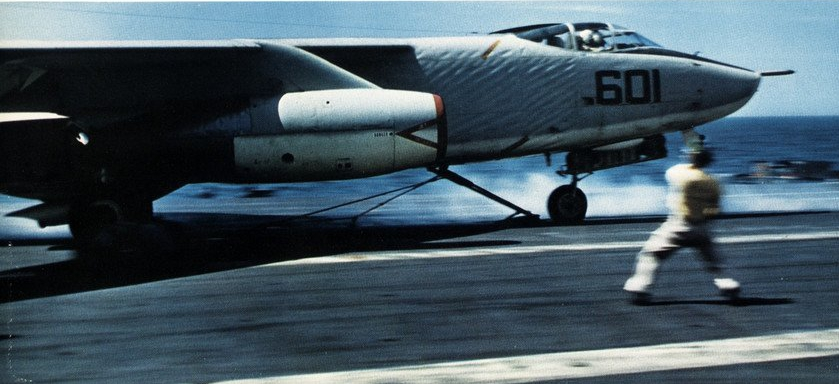
VAH-8 A-3B being launched from USS Constellation (CVA-64) in 1966. Note the stress wrinkles on the fuselage

VAH-8, was a Heavy Attack Squadron of the United States Navy, based at NAS Whidbey Island, Washington. It was established on 1 May 1957 and disestablished on 17 January 1968. The squadron primarily flew the Douglas A-3 Skywarrior aircraft.

== Operational history ==
On 13 Mar 1960, all nine of the squadron's A3D-2 Skywarriors were launched from the deck of USS Midway (CVA-41), while deployed to WestPac, and flew a formation trans-Pacific flight of 4,800 miles to their home port of NAS Whidbey Island. Refueling stops were made at NAS Barbers Point and NAS Alameda. The total flight time was 10.9 hours and the aircraft arrived at NAS Whidbey Island on 15 March.

On 13 Mar 1962 during exercise Potshot, squadron A3Ds were launched from USS Midway carrying Marine Corps paratroopers who were dropped on a target site at Camp Pendleton.

=== Vietnam War ===
During the Vietnam War VAH-8 was deployed on the following aircraft carriers operating on Yankee and Dixie Stations:

- 6 March – 23 November 1965, A-3Bs were embarked on USS Midway
- 12 May – 3 December 1966, A-3Bs were embarked on USS Constellation
- 29 April – 4 December 1967, KA-3Bs were embarked on USS Constellation

== See also ==
- History of the United States Navy
- List of inactive United States Navy aircraft squadrons
