= 600th Photo Squadron =

- Active: 1966-1976
- Disbanded: 1976
- Country: United States
- Branch: United States Air Force
- Motto(s): We Kill 'Em with Fillum
- Engagements: Vietnam War

The 600th Photo Squadron is an inactive United States Air Force (USAF) squadron. It was inactivated in 1976.

== History ==
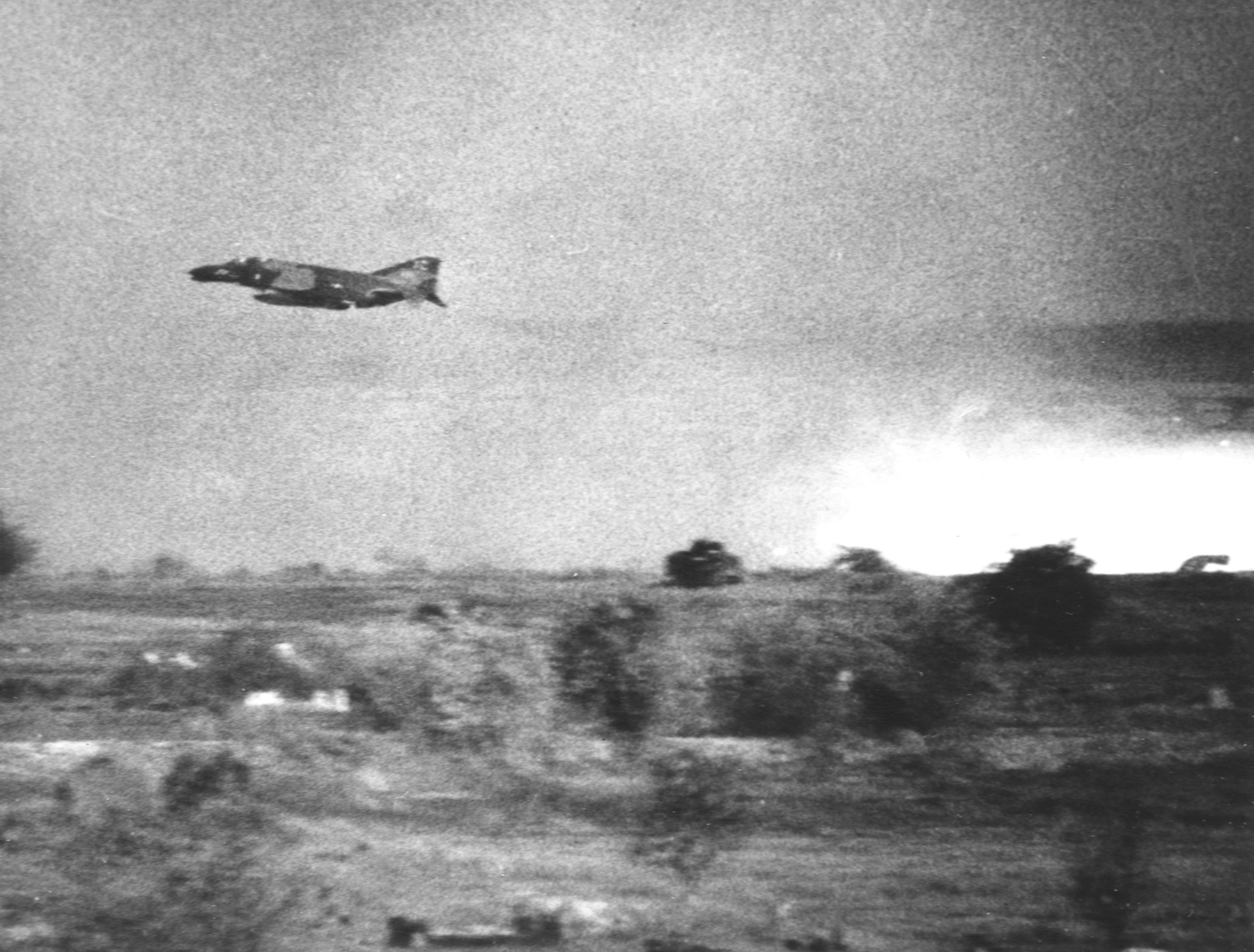
An F-4C Phantom II of the 557th TFS photographed by the 600th Photo Squadron in Vietnam in 1969

In 1966 the 1352 Photographic Group based at Lookout Mountain Air Force Station took on a new role, documenting the expanding Vietnam War. On 8 February 1966, Det. 5, 1352 Photographic Group at Tan Son Nhut Air Base, South Vietnam became the 600th Photo Squadron charged with the increased responsibility of all USAF photographic services in Southeast Asia except reconnaissance photography. This responsibility grew over the years to include combat documentation, automatic gun-camera and high-speed pod and blister photography of ordnance deliveries, still photography, and photographic support of the Vietnamese Air Force (VNAF).

The first commander of the 600th Photo Squadron was Colonel James P. Warndorf.

By 1968, the 600th Photo Squadron Detachments in Vietnam were:

Detachment 4 Cam Ranh Air Base, South Vietnam
Detachment 5 Phan Rang Air Base, South Vietnam
Detachment 6 Bien Hoa Air Base, South Vietnam
Detachment 7 Da Nang Air Base, South Vietnam
Detachment 8 Tuy Hoa Air Base, South Vietnam
Detachment 13 Nha Trang Air Base, South Vietnam
Detachment 14 Pleiku Air Base, South Vietnam
Detachment 15 Binh Thuy Air Base, South Vietnam
Detachment 16 Phu Cat Air Base, South Vietnam

In addition to the 9 detachments in South Vietnam, the 600th PS also oversaw OL-1 (Operating Location 1), which was assigned to HQ Military Assistance Command, Vietnam (MACV) in Saigon. The "MACV Team", as it was known, was free to document all branches of the armed forces in South Vietnam per the request of HQ MACV. The MACV team covered stories on the USAF, USA, US Navy, Marines, the Royal Thai Air Force and combat units from Australia, New Zealand, South Korea and the Philippines.

The Squadron was supported by the 400th Aero Squadron nicknamed "SCATBACK" which was responsible for the pickup of unprocessed film and the delivery of processed film within a 24-hour turnaround time.

By 1968, the 601st Photo Flight, with headquarters at Korat Royal Thai Air Force Base (RTAB), had also been formed and was operating out of 6 Royal Thai Air Force bases. The 601st Photo Flight Detachments in Thailand were:

Detachment 1 Korat Royal Thai Air Force Base - Later designated as Detachment 17 (1971)
Detachment 2 Takhli Royal Thai Air Force Base
Detachment 3 Ubon Royal Thai Air Force Base
Detachment 9 Udorn Royal Thai Air Force Base
Detachment 10 U-Tapao Royal Thai Navy Airfield
Detachment 11 Don Muang Royal Thai Air Force Base, Bangkok
Detachment 12 Nakhon Phanom Royal Thai Air Force Base

Between 1966 and 1976, the 600th Photo Squadron lost 11 combat cameramen killed-in-action. Four were killed in 1968 at the height of U.S. combat operations in Vietnam.
