= List of United States servicemembers and civilians missing in action during the Vietnam War (1968–69) =

This article is a list of U.S. MIAs of the Vietnam War in the period 1968–69. In 1973, the United States listed 2,646 Americans as unaccounted for from the entire Vietnam War. By October 2022, 1,582 Americans remained unaccounted for, of which 1,004 were classified as further pursuit, 488 as non-recoverable and 90 as deferred.

== 1968 ==
Date missing	Surname, First name(s)	Rank	Service	Unit	Operation/Battle Name	Location	Circumstances of loss	Recovery status
January 1	Dennison, James R	Lieutenant Commander	US Navy	VAP-61, USS Oriskany	Operation Rolling Thunder	North Vietnam, Gulf of Tonkin	Pilot of RA-3B #144847 hit by ground fire on a night photo-reconnaissance mission	Presumptive finding of death
January 1	Hanley, Terrence H	Lieutenant (LTJG)	US Navy	VAP-61, USS Oriskany	Operation Rolling Thunder	North Vietnam, Gulf of Tonkin	Copilot of RA-3B #144847 hit by ground fire on a night photo-reconnaissance mission	Presumptive finding of death
January 1	Herrin, Henry H	Chief Petty Officer	US Navy	VAP-61, USS Oriskany	Operation Rolling Thunder	North Vietnam, Gulf of Tonkin	Senior Chief Photographer on RA-3B #144847 hit by ground fire on a night photo-reconnaissance mission	Presumptive finding of death
January 3	Ellis, Billy J	Specialist	US Army	2nd Battalion, 12th Cavalry Regiment		South Vietnam, Quảng Nam Province	Believed to have been killed when an ammunition bunker exploded during a mortar attack on Landing Zone Leslie	Presumptive finding of death
January 3	Lancaster, Kenneth R	Specialist	US Army	E Company, 50th Infantry Regiment		South Vietnam, Khánh Hòa Province	Fell from the skid of a UH-1H after being extracted following a long range reconnaissance patrol	Presumptive finding of death
January 7	Stone, James M	1st Lieutenant	US Army	2nd Battalion, 12th Cavalry Regiment		South Vietnam, Quảng Nam Province	Killed during an ambush in the Que Son Valley, his body was left behind during the evacuation	Killed in action, body not recovered
January 7	Trujillo, Robert S	Private First Class	US Army	2nd Battalion, 12th Cavalry Regiment		South Vietnam	Disappeared during the evacuation following an ambush in the Que Son Valley	Presumptive finding of death
January 8	Smith, Hallie W	Captain	USAF	16th Tactical Reconnaissance Squadron		South Vietnam, Kon Tum Province	Pilot of RF-4C that crashed on a reconnaissance mission, the wreckage was located in steep terrain but the bodies of the crew could not be recovered due to enemy presence. In 2006 the remains of the copilot 1LT Charles Bifolchi were identified	Presumptive finding of death
January 9	Green, Norman M	Colonel	USAF	497th Tactical Fighter Squadron	Operation Steel Tiger	Laos, Savannakhet Province	Pilot of F-4D #66-8729 shot down on a night interdiction mission	Presumptive finding of death
January 9	Irsch, Wayne C	1st Lieutenant	USAF	497th Tactical Fighter Squadron	Operation Steel Tiger	Laos, Savannakhet Province	Weapons system operator on F-4D #66-8729 shot down on a night interdiction mission	Presumptive finding of death
January 9	Newton, Warren E	Specialist	US Army	7th Squadron, 17th Cavalry Regiment		South Vietnam, Quảng Tín Province	Gunner on UH-1C gunship #66-00745 hit by enemy fire, crashed and burned. SAR forces recovered the burnt remains of three crewmen only one of whom could be identified.	Presumptive finding of death until 8 June 2015 when he was accounted for
January 9	Phipps, James L	Warrant Officer	US Army	7th Squadron, 17th Cavalry Regiment		South Vietnam, Quảng Tín Province	Aircraft commander of UH-1C gunship #66-00745 hit by enemy fire, crashed and burned	Presumptive finding of death until 8 June 2015 when he was accounted for
January 9	Ramos, Rainier S	Warrant Officer	US Army	7th Squadron, 17th Cavalry Regiment		South Vietnam, Quảng Tín Province	Pilot of UH-1C gunship #66-00745 hit by enemy fire, crashed and burned	Presumptive finding of death until 8 June 2015 when he was accounted for
January 9	Rehe, Richard R	Private First Class	US Army	3rd Battalion, 21st Infantry Regiment		South Vietnam, Happy Valley	Wounded and captured in battle	Died in captivity, remains not returned
January 9	Sykes, Derri	Private First Class	US Army	3rd Battalion, 21st Infantry Regiment		South Vietnam, Happy Valley	Seriously wounded and captured in battle	Died in captivity, remains not returned
January 12	Cohron, James D	Staff Sergeant	US Army	RT Indiana, MACV-SOG	Operation Shining Brass	Laos, Salavan Province	Disappeared when his team was ambushed	Presumptive finding of death
January 15	Skarman, Orval H	Sergeant	USMC	3rd Battalion 3rd Marines		South Vietnam, Da Nang	Disappeared while on R&R	Presumptive finding of death
January 16	Cooley, Orville D	Lieutenant	US Navy	USS Kitty Hawk		North Vietnam, Gulf of Tonkin	Copilot of C-1A #146054 that ditched on launch	Killed in action, body not recovered
January 16	Reedy, William H	Aviation Ordnanceman 3rd Class	US Navy	USS Kitty Hawk		North Vietnam, Gulf of Tonkin	Crewman on C-1A #146054 that ditched on launch	Killed in action, body not recovered
January 16	Thompson, William J	Captain	US Navy	USS Kitty Hawk		North Vietnam, Gulf of Tonkin	Pilot of C-1A #146054 that ditched on launch	Killed in action, body not recovered
January 16	Gee, Paul S	1st Lieutenant	USMC	VMCJ-1		South Vietnam, Da Nang	Copilot of EF-10B that crashed at sea	Presumptive finding of death
January 16	Moreland, William D	Captain	USMC	VMCJ-1		South Vietnam, Da Nang	Pilot of EF-10B that crashed at sea	Presumptive finding of death
January 17	Wilke, Robert F	Lieutenant Colonel	USAF	602d Fighter Squadron, Commando		North Vietnam, Quảng Bình Province	His A-1H crashed while on a search and rescue mission	Presumptive finding of death
January 18	Boles, Warren W	Lieutenant (LTJG)	US Navy	VF-114, USS Kitty Hawk		North Vietnam, Gulf of Tonkin	Pilot of an F-4B that crashed at sea while investigating a surface contact	Killed in action, body not recovered
January 18	Roehrich, Ronald L	Lieutenant (LTJG)	US Navy	VF-114, USS Kitty Hawk		North Vietnam, Gulf of Tonkin	Radar intercept officer on an F-4B that crashed at sea while investigating a surface contact	Killed in action, body not recovered
January 19	Johnson, William D	Private First Class	US Army	3rd Battalion, 12th Infantry Regiment		South Vietnam, Kon Tum Province	Disappeared during an ambush	Presumptive finding of death
January 20	Holley, Tilden S	Captain	USAF	389th Tactical Fighter Squadron	Operation Rolling Thunder	North Vietnam, Quảng Bình Province	Pilot of an F-4C shot down on a night armed reconnaissance mission	Presumptive finding of death
January 20	Ketterer, James A	1st Lieutenant	USAF	389th Tactical Fighter Squadron	Operation Rolling Thunder	North Vietnam, Quảng Bình Province	Weapons system officer on an F-4C shot down on a night armed reconnaissance mission	Presumptive finding of death
January 21	Coalston, Echol W	Specialist 5	US Army	1st Transportation Battalion		South Vietnam, Vũng Tàu	Lost overboard from the USNS Corpus Christi Bay (T-ARVH-1)	Presumptive finding of death
January 21	Elliott, Jerry W	Private	US Army	282nd Assault Helicopter Company		South Vietnam, Khe Sanh	Door gunner on a UH-1D that landed to assist the evacuation of a downed helicopter, he was left behind when his helicopter departed the area due to enemy fire and his body was observed several days later	Presumptive finding of death
January 21	Hill, Billy D	Staff Sergeant	US Army	282nd AHC		South Vietnam, Khe Sanh	Gunner on a UH-1D that was shot down while inserting ARVN troops east of Khe Sanh	Presumptive finding of death until 10 December 2015 when he was accounted for
January 23	Ramsden, Gerald L	Lieutenant Commander	US Navy	VA-165, USS Ranger	Operation Rolling Thunder	North Vietnam, Gulf of Tonkin	Copilot of A-6A #152932 that crashed at sea, the pilot CDR L S Kollmorgen ejected successfully	Killed in action, body not recovered
January 27	Cordova, Robert J	Fireman Apprentice	US Navy	USS Valley Forge		South Vietnam, South China Sea	Lost overboard	Killed in action, body not recovered
January 29	Mills, James D	Captain	USMC	VMA-211		South Vietnam, Thừa Thiên Province	His A-4E crashed	Killed in action, body not recovered
January 29	White, Charles E	Sergeant First Class	US Army	Detachment B-50, Project Delta, MACV-SOG	Operation Daniel Boone	Cambodia, Ratanakiri Province	Fell from his McGuire rig during a helicopter extraction. SAR forces searched the area 2 days later but were unable to locate his body	Presumptive finding of death
January 31	Cocheo, Richard N	Civilian	Pacific Architects and Engineers		Tet Offensive	South Vietnam, Vĩnh Long	Captured by Viet Cong after his house was surrounded and his wife was killed. Last seen alive in May 1968	Unaccounted for
January 31	Lacey, Richard J	Sergeant	US Army	Long Lines Detachment South, 1st Signal Brigade	Tet Offensive	South Vietnam, Saigon	Disappeared in a jeep in the southern outskirts of Saigon. His passenger SP4 William Behren's body was recovered 4 days later	Presumptive finding of death
January 31	Smith, Harry W	Major	USAF	34th Tactical Fighter Squadron		Laos, Bam Senphan	Weapons systems officer of F-4E #67-0219 shot down by 37-mm AAA while on a search and rescue mission. In 1989 the remains of the pilot Captain Jon K. Bodahl were identified	Presumptive finding of death
February 1	Olsen, Betty A	Civilian	Christian and Missionary Alliance		Tet Offensive	South Vietnam, Buôn Ma Thuột	Missionary/nurse captured by Viet Cong from the Buôn Ma Thuột leprosarium. Died of disease/malnutrition on 1 February 1969	Died in captivity, remains not returned
February 2	Adkins, Charles L	E4	US Army	1st Squadron, 9th Cavalry Regiment		South Vietnam, Thừa Thiên Province	Passenger on UH-1H #66-16442 that crashed on a flight from Quảng Trị Province to Chu Lai. The burnt wreckage of the helicopter was located in May 1968 and some remains were recovered	Presumptive finding of death
February 2	Burnham, Donald D	Captain	US Army	1st Squadron, 9th Cavalry Regiment		South Vietnam, Thừa Thiên Province	Pilot of UH-1H #66-16442 that crashed on a flight from Quảng Trị Province to Chu Lai	Presumptive finding of death
February 2	Patton, Kenneth J	Sergeant	US Army	1st Squadron, 9th Cavalry Regiment		South Vietnam, Thừa Thiên Province	Crew chief on UH-1H #66-16442 that crashed on a flight from Quảng Trị Province to Chu Lai	Presumptive finding of death
February 2	Pringle, Joe H	Sergeant First Class	US Army	1st Squadron, 9th Cavalry Regiment		South Vietnam, Thừa Thiên Province	Passenger on UH-1H #66-16442 that crashed on a flight from Quảng Trị Province to Chu Lai	Presumptive finding of death
February 2	Puggi, Joseph D	Staff Sergeant	US Army	1st Squadron, 9th Cavalry Regiment		South Vietnam, Thừa Thiên Province	Passenger on UH-1H #66-16442 that crashed on a flight from Quảng Trị Province to Chu Lai	Presumptive finding of death
February 3	Wilson, Marion E	Private First Class	US Army	4th Battalion, 23rd Infantry Regiment		South Vietnam, Bình Dương Province	Driver of an armored personnel carrier which was hit by a rocket propelled grenade, caught fire, and exploded. No identifiable remains were recovered from the wreckage	Killed in action, body not recovered
February 5	Godwin, Solomon H	Warrant Officer	USMC	1st Counter-Intelligence Team, 1st Marine Division	Tet Offensive	Laos,	Intelligence specialist captured in Huế, he died of disease and malnutrition in late July 1968	Died in captivity, remains not returned
February 5	Potter, William T	1st Lieutenant	USAF	14th Tactical Reconnaissance Squadron	Operation Steel Tiger	Laos, Khammouane Province	Pilot of an RF-4C #66-0443 that crashed into the ground on a photo-reconnaissance mission. No ejections observed. The remains of the copilot 1LT Robert John Edgar were returned in May 1997 and identified in April 2009	Presumptive finding of death
February 6	Burnett, Donald F	Senior chief aviation anti-submarine warfare man	US Navy	VP-26	Operation Market Time	South Vietnam, Gulf of Thailand	Senior chief aviation anti-submarine warfare man on P-3B #153440 that crashed at sea on a 24-hour surveillance mission. The aircraft wreckage was located and 2 bodies were recovered.	Killed in action, body not recovered
February 6	Chapa, Armando	Aviation Antisubmarine Warfare Technician 3rd Class	US Navy	VP-26	Operation Market Time	South Vietnam, Gulf of Thailand	Aviation anti-submarine warfare technician on P-3B #153440 that crashed at sea on a 24-hour surveillance mission	Killed in action, body not recovered
February 6	Farris, William F	Aviation Antisubmarine Warfare Technician 3rd Class	US Navy	VP-26	Operation Market Time	South Vietnam, Gulf of Thailand	Aviation anti-submarine warfare technician on P-3B #153440 that crashed at sea on a 24-hour surveillance mission	Killed in action, body not recovered
February 6	Gallagher, Donald L	Chief Aviation Ordnanceman	US Navy	VP-26	Operation Market Time	South Vietnam, Gulf of Thailand	Aviation ordnanceman on P-3B #153440 that crashed at sea on a 24-hour surveillance mission	Killed in action, body not recovered
February 6	Huss, Roy A	Lieutenant (LTJG)	US Navy	VP-26	Operation Market Time	South Vietnam, Gulf of Thailand	Crewman on P-3B #153440 that crashed at sea on a 24-hour surveillance mission	Killed in action, body not recovered
February 6	Jones, Thomas P	Lieutenant	US Navy	VP-26	Operation Market Time	South Vietnam, Gulf of Thailand	Copilot of P-3B #153440 that crashed at sea on a 24-hour surveillance mission	Killed in action, body not recovered
February 6	McKay, Homer E	Aviation Structural Mechanic 2nd Class	US Navy	VP-26	Operation Market Time	South Vietnam, Gulf of Thailand	Aviation structural mechanic on P-3B #153440 that crashed at sea on a 24-hour surveillance mission	Killed in action, body not recovered
February 6	Newman, James C	Aviation Machinist 1st Class	US Navy	VP-26	Operation Market Time	South Vietnam, Gulf of Thailand	Aviation mechanic reciprocating on P-3B #153440 that crashed at sea on a 24-hour surveillance mission	Killed in action, body not recovered
February 6	Thompson, Melvin C	Aviation Electrician 1st Class	US Navy	VP-26	Operation Market Time	South Vietnam, Gulf of Thailand	Aviation electrician on P-3B #153440 that crashed at sea on a 24-hour surveillance mission	Killed in action, body not recovered
February 6	Travis, Lynn M	Lieutenant (LTJG)	US Navy	VP-26	Operation Market Time	South Vietnam, Gulf of Thailand	Crewman on P-3B #153440 that crashed at sea on a 24-hour surveillance mission	Killed in action, body not recovered
February 7	Holt, James W	Master Sergeant	US Army	Detachment A-101, 5th Special Forces Group	Battle of Lang Vei	South Vietnam, Lang Vei	Disappeared while searching for M72 LAWs during the battle	Listed as presumptive finding of death until 10 January 2015 when he was accounted for
February 7	Phillips, Daniel R	Specialist 5	US Army	Detachment A-101, 5th Special Forces Group	Battle of Lang Vei	South Vietnam, Lang Vei	Wounded in the battle and last seen trying to evade PAVN troops	Presumptive finding of death
February 8	George, James E	Private First Class	US Army	129th Maintenance Company, 69th Maintenance Battalion		South Vietnam, Quảng Trị Province	Passenger on UH-1D #64-13894 that was shot down, he was severely burnt while trying to retrieve his rifle from the wreck, he was captured by Viet Cong and believed to have been executed	Died in captivity, remains not returned
February 12	Brown, Harry W	Staff Sergeant	US Army	43rd Medical Group, 44th Medical Brigade		South Vietnam, Đắk Nông Province	Medic on UH-1H #66-17027 that crashed on a night medevac mission to the Gia Nghĩa special forces camp	Presumptive finding of death
February 12	Groth, Wade L	Staff Sergeant	US Army	43rd Medical Group, 44th Medical Brigade		South Vietnam, Đắk Nông province	Crew chief on UH-1H #66-17027 that crashed on a night medevac mission	Presumptive finding of death
February 12	Gunn, Alan W	Warrant Officer	US Army	43rd Medical Group, 44th Medical Brigade		South Vietnam, Đắk Nông province	Pilot of UH-1H #66-17027 that crashed on a night medevac mission	Presumptive finding of death
February 12	Roe, Jerry L	1st Lieutenant	US Army	43rd Medical Group, 44th Medical Brigade		South Vietnam, Đắk Nông province	Aircraft commander of UH-1H #66-17027 that crashed on a night medevac mission	Presumptive finding of death
February 14	Dunn, Joseph P	Lieutenant (LTJG)	US Navy	VA-25, USS Coral Sea		China, Hainan	His A-1H was shot down by People's Liberation Army Air Force MiG-17s after losing course on a ferry flight from Naval Air Station Cubi Point to the USS Coral Sea in the Gulf of Tonkin. He successfully ejected and his emergency locator beacon was heard for 20 minutes	Presumptive finding of death
February 20	Laureano-Lopez, Ismael	Specialist 4	US Army	2nd Battalion, 503rd Infantry Regiment		South Vietnam, Đắk Nông province	Drowned while on patrol	Killed in action, body not recovered
February 23	Hubler, George L	Captain	USMC	VMF(AW)-235		South Vietnam, South China Sea	His F-8E collided with another aircraft and crashed at sea	Killed in action, body not recovered
February 27	Milius, Paul L	Captain	US Navy	VO-67	Operation Steel Tiger	Laos, Khammouane Province	Pilot of OP-2E hit by enemy fire on an armed reconnaissance mission, 7 crewmen escaped and were rescued and the remains of the 8th crewman Petty Officer John F. Hartzheim were returned in March 1999. USS Milius is named in his honour	Presumptive finding of death
February 27	Wright, Thomas T	Captain	USAF	14th Tactical Reconnaissance Squadron	Operation Steel Tiger	Laos, Savannakhet Province	Weapons system operator on RF-4C lost on a daytime photo-reconnaissance mission. The remains of the pilot LTC Gilbert Palmer were identified in May 2011	Presumptive finding of death
February 28	Coons, Henry A	Lieutenant Commander	US Navy	VA-35, USS Enterprise	Operation Rolling Thunder	North Vietnam, Gulf of Tonkin	Pilot of A-6A #152938 hit by enemy fire and crashed at sea	Presumptive finding of death
February 28	Stegman, Thomas	Lieutenant	US Navy	VA-35, USS Enterprise	Operation Rolling Thunder	North Vietnam, Gulf of Tonkin	Bombardier/navigator on A-6A #152938 hit by enemy fire and crashed at sea	Presumptive finding of death
February 28	Hunt, Robert W	Corporal	US Army	3rd Squadron, 4th Cavalry Regiment		South Vietnam, Gia Định Province	Gunner on an M-41 tank, disappeared during an ambush	Presumptive finding of death
March 1	Lannom, Richard C	Lieutenant (LTJG)	US Navy	VA-35, USS Enterprise	Operation Rolling Thunder	North Vietnam, Gulf of Tonkin	Bombardier/navigator on A-6A #152944 hit by enemy fire after a night attack near Haiphong	Presumptive finding of death until 25 September 2018 when he was accounted for
March 1	Scheurich, Thomas E	Lieutenant Commander	US Navy	VA-35, USS Enterprise	Operation Rolling Thunder	North Vietnam, Gulf of Tonkin	Pilot of A-6A #152944 hit by enemy fire after a night attack near Haiphong	Presumptive finding of death
March 4	Welshan, John T	1st Lieutenant	USAF	604th Air Commando Squadron		South Vietnam, Bạc Liêu Province	His A-37B disappeared on a ground attack mission	Presumptive finding of death
March 6	Colombo, Gary L	Corporal	USMC	HMM-164		South Vietnam, South China Sea	Crew chief on a CH-46A that ditched at sea following a maintenance test flight from the USS Valley Forge	Killed in action, body not recovered
March 6	Mitchell, Gilbert L	Lieutenant	US Navy	VA-75, USS Kitty Hawk	Operation Rolling Thunder	North Vietnam	Bombardier/navigator on an A-6A shot down on a night attack mission. The remains of the pilot Lt. Richard C. Nelson were returned in 1984	Presumptive finding of death
March 11	Blanton, Clarence F	Lieutenant Colonel	USAF	1043rd Radar Evacuation Squadron, 1st Combat Evaluation Group	Battle of Lima Site 85	Laos, Lima Site 85	Commander of USAF personnel at the facility. Disappeared during the battle. Listed as killed in action, body not recovered, his remains were recovered and subsequently identified in September 2012	Recovered, September 2012
March 11	Calfee, James H	Master Sergeant	USAF	1043rd Radar Evacuation Squadron	Battle of Lima Site 85	Laos, Phou Pha Thi	Disappeared during the battle	Killed in action, body not recovered until 8 August 2025 when he was accounted for
March 11	Davis, James W	Staff Sergeant	USAF	1043rd Radar Evacuation Squadron	Battle of Lima Site 85	Laos, Phou Pha Thi	Disappeared during the battle	Killed in action, body not recovered
March 11	Gish, Henry Gerald	Staff Sergeant	USAF	1043rd Radar Evacuation Squadron	Battle of Lima Site 85	Laos, Phou Pha Thi	Disappeared during the battle	Killed in action, body not recovered until 23 June 2025 when he was accounted for
March 11	Hall, Willis R	Technical Sergeant	USAF	1043rd Radar Evacuation Squadron	Battle of Lima Site 85	Laos, Phou Pha Thi	Disappeared during the battle	Killed in action, body not recovered until 23 June 2025 when he was accounted for
March 11	Holland, Melvin A	Technical Sergeant	USAF	1043rd Radar Evacuation Squadron	Battle of Lima Site 85	Laos, Phou Pha Thi	Disappeared during the battle	Killed in action, body not recovered
March 11	Kirk, Herbert A	Staff Sergeant	USAF	1043rd Radar Evacuation Squadron	Battle of Lima Site 85	Laos, Phou Pha Thi	Disappeared during the battle	Killed in action, body not recovered
March 11	Price, David S	Sergeant	USAF	1043rd Radar Evacuation Squadron	Battle of Lima Site 85	Laos, Phou Pha Thi	Disappeared during the battle	Killed in action, body not recovered until 22 July 2024 when he was accounted for
March 11	Springsteadah, Donald K	Technical Sergeant	USAF	1043rd Radar Evacuation Squadron	Battle of Lima Site 85	Laos, Phou Pha Thi	Disappeared during the battle	Killed in action, body not recovered until 23 June 2025 when he was accounted for
March 11	Worley, Don F	Staff Sergeant	USAF	1043rd Radar Evacuation Squadron	Battle of Lima Site 85	Laos, Phou Pha Thi	Disappeared during the battle	Killed in action, body not recovered until 22 June 2026 when he was accounted for
March 11	Bond, Ronald D	Major	USAF	604th Air Commando Squadron		South Vietnam, Phước Tuy Province	His A-37A was hit by ground fire during a close air support mission and crashed. SAR forces secured the area shortly after the crash but were unable to locate any remains	Killed in action, body not recovered
March 11	Calloway, Porter E	Sergeant	US Army	3rd Battalion, 21st Infantry Regiment		South Vietnam, Que Son District	Wounded in an ambush and captured, he was reported to have died from his wounds the following day	Presumptive finding of death
March 12	Griffith, John G	Lieutenant	US Navy	VA-35, USS Enterprise	Operation Rolling Thunder	North Vietnam, Gulf of Tonkin	Bombardier/navigator on A-6A #152943 that ditched on launch	Killed in action, body not recovered
March 12	Kollman, Glenn E	Commander	US Navy	VA-35, USS Enterprise	Operation Rolling Thunder	North Vietnam, Gulf of Tonkin	Pilot of A-6A # 152943that ditched on launch	Killed in action, body not recovered
March 12	Rogers, Edward F	Private First Class	USMC	2nd Battalion 4th Marines		South Vietnam, Quảng Trị Province	Rifleman killed during a battle in the village of Lam Xuan	Killed in action, body not recovered
March 13	Byrne, Joseph H	Major	USAF	1st Air Commando Squadron		Laos	Co-pilot of A-1E #133888	Killed in action, body not recovered
March 13	Collins, Guy F	Lieutenant Commander	USAF	1st Air Commando Squadron		Laos	Pilot of A-1E #133888	Killed in action, body not recovered
March 13	Evans, Cleveland	Sergeant	USMC	3rd Motor Transport Battalion		South Vietnam, Quảng Nam Province	Passenger on a UH-1H #67-17254 shot down on a flight from Phu Bai to Camp Evans. All passengers and crew survived the crash and split into 2 5-man teams, one to stay at the crash site and the other to walk to Camp Evans. The crash site team was attacked by Viet Cong and all were killed, the remains of 2 other members of the team were located 15 days later	Presumptive finding of death
March 13	Heitman, Steven W	Staff Sergeant	US Army	1st Squadron, 9th Cavalry Regiment		South Vietnam, Quảng Nam Province	Passenger on UH-1H #67-17254 shot down on a flight from Phu Bai to Camp Evans, killed during a Viet Cong attack on the crash site	Presumptive finding of death
March 13	Watson, Jimmy L	Warrant Officer	US Army	1st Squadron, 9th Cavalry Regiment		South Vietnam, Quảng Nam Province	Copilot of UH-1H #67-17254 shot down on a flight from Phu Bai to Camp Evans, killed during a Viet Cong attack on the crash site	Presumptive finding of death
March 14	Hamm, James E	1st Lieutenant	USAF	390th Tactical Fighter Squadron		South Vietnam, Thừa Thiên Province	Pilot of F-4D shot down on a close air support mission, both crewmen successfully ejected and he directed airstrikes on enemy positions before radio contact ceased	Presumptive finding of death
March 16	Erickson, David W	Private First Class	USMC	2nd Battalion, 27th Marines		South Vietnam, Quảng Nam Province	Disappeared while inspecting a river bank	Presumptive finding of death
March 16	Krausman, Edward L	Private First Class	USMC	2nd Battalion, 27th Marines		South Vietnam, Quảng Nam Province	Disappeared while inspecting a river bank	Presumptive finding of death
March 17	Barber, Thomas D	Airman	US Navy	VS-23, USS Yorktown		North Vietnam, Gulf of Tonkin	Reciprocating engine mechanic on an S-2E that disappeared on a night anti-submarine patrol, some aircraft wreckage was receovered 4 days later	Killed in action, body not recovered
March 17	Benson, Lee D	Lieutenant (LTJG)	US Navy	VS-23, USS Yorktown		North Vietnam, Gulf of Tonkin	Copilot of an S-2E that disappeared on a night anti-submarine patrol	Killed in action, body not recovered
March 17	Hubbs, Donald R	Commander	US Navy	VS-23, USS Yorktown		North Vietnam, Gulf of Tonkin	Pilot of an S-2E that disappeared on a night anti-submarine patrol	Killed in action, body not recovered
March 17	Nightingale, Randall J	Aviation Antisubmarine Warfare Technician 2nd Class	US Navy	VS-23, USS Yorktown		North Vietnam, Gulf of Tonkin	ASW technician on an S-2E that disappeared on a night anti-submarine patrol	Killed in action, body not recovered
March 17	Hensley, Thomas T	Captain	USAF	469th Tactical Fighter Squadron	Operation Barell Roll	Laos, Sam Neua	His F-105D #61-0162 was hit by enemy fire and crashed	Presumptive finding of death
March 18	Ray, James M	Private First Class	US Army	Advisory Team 38, MACV Advisors		South Vietnam, Lâm Đồng Province	Captured by Viet Cong while on a road-clearing operation. Died of malnutrition and disease in November 1969	Died in captivity, remains not returned
March 18	Switzer, Jerrold A	Private First Class	USMC	1st Combined Action Group		South Vietnam, Quảng Ngãi Province	Drowned in the Quảng Ngãi River while trying to assist Vietnamese civilians	Killed in action, body not recovered
March 19	Romero, Victor	Sergeant	USAF	21st Tactical Air Support Squadron		South Vietnam, Khánh Hòa Province	Observer/radio operator on O-1G #51-4899 that disappeared on a visual reconnaissance mission. The remains of the pilot Major Charles E. Blair were returned in April 1988	Presumptive finding of death
March 20	Fellows, Allen E	Major	USAF	20th Tactical Air Support Squadron	Operation Steel Tiger	Laos, Tchepone	His O-2A #67-21338 disappeared on a forward air control mission	Presumptive finding of death
March 21	Hesford, Peter D	1st Lieutenant	USAF	390th Tactical Fighter Squadron	Operation Steel Tiger	Laos, Ban Karai Pass	Pilot of an F-4D hit by ground fire, no ejection observed	Presumptive finding of death
March 21	Stowers, Aubrey E	1st Lieutenant	USAF	390th Tactical Fighter Squadron	Operation Steel Tiger	Laos, Ban Karai Pass	Weapons system operator on an F-4D hit by ground fire, no ejection observed	Presumptive finding of death
March 22	Lyon, Donovan L	Major	USAF	559th Tactical Fighter Squadron	Operation Steel Tiger	Laos	Weapons system operator on an F-4C #64-0830 hit by enemy fire. The pilot Colonel Theodore W. Guy ejected and was captured, he did not believe that Lyon had ejected in time	Presumptive finding of death
March 23	Franks, Ian J	Specialist	US Army	244th Aviation Company, 307th Aviation Battalion		South Vietnam, Cần Thơ	Observer on OV-1C #603756 that crashed into the Hậu Giang River while manoevuring at low level. Some wreckage, flight helmets and human tissue were recovered	Killed in action, body not recovered
March 23	Hattori, Masaki	Major	US Army	244th Aviation Company		South Vietnam	Pilot of OV-1C #603756 that crashed into the Hậu Giang River while manoevuring at low level	Killed in action, body not recovered
March 26	Allgood, Frankie E	Lieutenant Colonel	USMC	HMM-363		South Vietnam, South China Sea	Commanding officer of HMM-363, he was wounded during a mortar attack on Phu Bai airbase he was being evacuated on UH-34D #144654 of HMM-363 that crashed at sea in bad weather north of Da Nang. Both pilots were rescued	Killed in action, body not recovered
March 26	Evancho, Richard	Lance Corporal	USMC	Marine Air Base Squadron 36		South Vietnam, South China Sea	Medical evacuee on a UH-34D #144654 that crashed at sea in bad weather north of Da Nang	Killed in action, body not recovered
March 26	Green, Larry E	Lance Corporal	USMC	HMM-363		South Vietnam, South China Sea	Crew chief on a UH-34D #144654 that crashed at sea in bad weather north of Da Nang.	Killed in action, body not recovered
March 26	Kerr, Ernest C	Lance Corporal	USMC	HMM-363		South Vietnam, South China Sea	Gunner on a UH-34D #144654 that crashed at sea in bad weather north of Da Nang.	Killed in action, body not recovered
March 26	Mowrey, Glenn W	Corporal	USMC	H&S Company, 3rd Service Battalion		South Vietnam, South China Sea	Medical evacuee on a UH-34D #144654 that crashed at sea in bad weather north of Da Nang.	Killed in action, body not recovered
March 26	Lomax, Richard E	Specialist	US Army	3rd Battalion, 7th Infantry Regiment		South Vietnam, Biên Hòa Province	Rifleman setting demolition charges in an enemy bunker complex, killed when the charges detonated prematurely	Killed in action, body not recovered
March 27	Badley, James L	1st Lieutenant	USAF	480th Tactical Fighter Squadron	Operation Rolling Thunder	North Vietnam, Ban Karai Pass	Weapons system operator on an F-4D #66‑8801 that was shot down and exploded on impact while on a daylight bombing mission	Killed in action, body not recovered
March 27	Whitteker, Richard L	Captain	USAF	480th Tactical Fighter Squadron	Operation Rolling Thunder	North Vietnam, Ban Karai Pass	Pilot of F-4D #66‑8801 that was shot down	Killed in action, body not recovered
March 27	Calhoun, Johnny C	Corporal	US Army	Command and Control Detachment, MACV-SOG		South Vietnam, Thừa Thiên Province	Team leader of a reconnaissance team that was operating in the A Shau Valley. The team was attacked while awaiting extraction, he was providing covering fire for the team when he was seen to be shot several times and was left behind	Presumptive finding of death
March 28	Boyer, Alan L	Sergeant	US Army	RT Asp, MACV-SOG		Laos, Savannakhet Province	Member of a US/ARVN reconnaissance team that was engaged by the enemy. As the team was being extracted by rope ladder from a hovering helicopter, the ladder broke and he fell to the ground with the 2 other Americans in the team. SAR forces searched the area 3 days later but were unable to find any trace of him or the other 2 missing Americans. The remains of the team leader, SFC George R Brown were identified in 2006	Presumptive finding of death until 16 March 2016 when his remains were recovered
March 28	Huston, Charles G	Sergeant	US Army	RT Asp, MACV-SOG		Laos, Savannakhet Province	Member of a US/ARVN reconnaissance team that was engaged by the enemy, he was unable to be extracted	Presumptive finding of death
March 28	Graham, Dennis L	Captain	USAF	428th Tactical Fighter Squadron	Operation Combat Lancer	North Vietnam, Quảng Bình Province	Copilot of F-111A #66-0022 lost on a night bombing mission.	Presumptive finding of death
March 28	MacCann, Henry E	Major	USAF	428th Tactical Fighter Squadron	Operation Combat Lancer	North Vietnam, Quảng Bình Province	Pilot of F-111A #66-0022 lost on a night bombing mission.	Presumptive finding of death
March 28	Grosse, Christopher A	Private First Class	US Army	1st Battalion, 7th Cavalry Regiment		South Vietnam, Thừa Thiên Province	Shot and wounded in an ambush, he was left behind when his unit withdrew and could not be recovered	Presumptive finding of death
March 30	Cichon, Walter A	Specialist	US Army	3rd Battalion, 8th Infantry Regiment		South Vietnam, Kon Tum Province	Shot in the head and confirmed to be dead during an assault, his body was left behind and could not be recovered	Presumptive finding of death
March 30	Sayre, Leslie B	1st Lieutenant	US Army	221st Aviation Company, 307TH Aviation Battalion		South Vietnam, Kiên Giang province	Pilot of an O-1D shot down on a visual reconnaissance mission. His observer SGT William B. Taylor was captured, subsequently escaped from a Viet Cong POW camp and was rescued by a US Army helicopter on 6 May	Killed in action, body not recovered
April 3	Mulleavey, Quinten E	Specialist	US Army	2nd Battalion, 503rd Infantry Regiment		South Vietnam, Bong Son	Disappeared while on patrol	Presumptive finding of death
April 3	Rexroad, Ronald R	Captain	USAF	11th Tactical Reconnaissance Squadron	Operation Rolling Thunder	North Vietnam, Gulf of Tonkin	Pilot of an RF-4C that crashed at sea after bomb damage assessment mission. On 11 April the remains of the weapons system operator Capt. John C. Hardy were recovered from the sea	Presumptive finding of death
April 3	Thomas, James C	Lance Corporal	USMC	3rd Battalion 7th Marines		South Vietnam, Quảng Nam Province	Disappeared while on patrol	Presumptive finding of death
April 4	Trivelpiece, Steve M	Private First Class	US Army	3rd Battalion, 47th Infantry Regiment		South Vietnam, Khánh Hòa Province	Passenger on a Navy troop carrier making a river assault, he was killed by enemy fire and his body was left behind during the withdrawal	Killed in action, body not recovered
April 6	Pepper, Anthony J	Private First Class	USMC	2nd Battalion, 26th Marines	Operation Scotland II	South Vietnam, Khe Sanh	His unit was ambushed on patrol and he took shelter in a bomb crater which received a direct hit from a mortar round, no identifiable remains were recovered	Killed in action, body not recovered
April 6	Trimble, James M	Corporal	USMC	2nd Battalion, 26th Marines	Operation Scotland II	South Vietnam, Khe Sanh	His unit was ambushed on patrol and he took shelter in a bomb crater which received a direct hit from a mortar round, no identifiable remains were recovered	Killed in action, body not recovered
April 7	McMurray, Fred H	1st Lieutenant	US Army	1st Squadron, 9th Cavalry Regiment	Operation Pegasus	South Vietnam, Quảng Trị Province	Pilot of OH-13S #63-9084 shot down while on a hunter-killer mission	Presumptive finding of death
April 9	Lawson, Karl W	Specialist	US Army	Detachment B-35, 5th Special Forces Group		South Vietnam, Tây Ninh Province	Killed by friendly fire from a fire support mission for his reconnaissance patrol. His remains were placed in a body bag, which fell from a helicopter during evacuation	Killed in action, body not recovered
April 10	Carver, Harry F	Staff Sergeant	US Army	Company E, 15th Engineer Battalion		South Vietnam, Biên Hòa Province	Member of an airboat patrol that was ambushed by enemy forces, he was severely wounded and disappeared when the boat capsized	Killed in action, body not recovered
April 10	Padgett, Samuel J	Sergeant First Class	US Army	C&C Detachment, MACV-SOG		South Vietnam, Quang Tin province	Passenger on a UH-34 that crashed while flying from Da Nang to Kham Đức, his remains could not be identified among the burnt wreckage	Killed in action, body not recovered
April 11	Whittemore, Frederick H	Commander	US Navy	VA-212, USS Bon Homme Richard		South Vietnam, South China Sea	His A-4F crashed at sea	Killed in action, body not recovered
April 17	Held, John W	Captain	USAF	604th Air Commando Squadron		South Vietnam, Phước Long Province	His A-37A was hit by ground fire and he ejected successfully. SAR forces located his empty parachute in trees shortly after the crash	Presumptive finding of death
April 19	Blodgett, Douglas R	Specialist	US Army	A Company, 228th Assault Support Helicopter Battalion	Operation Delaware	South Vietnam, A Shau Valley	Crewman on CH-47A #64-13124 hit by enemy fire and crashed on approach to LZ Tiger	Presumptive finding of death
April 19	Dennis, William R	Specialist	US Army	A Company, 228th Assault Support Helicopter Battalion	Operation Delaware	South Vietnam, A Shau Valley	Flight engineer on CH-47A #64-13124 hit by enemy fire and crashed	Presumptive finding of death
April 19	Gonzalez, Jesus A	Staff Sergeant	US Army	A Company, 228th Assault Support Helicopter Battalion	Operation Delaware	South Vietnam, A Shau Valley	Crew chief on CH-47A #64-13124 hit by enemy fire and crashed	Presumptive finding of death
April 19	Housh, Anthony F	Sergeant First Class	US Army	B Company, 228th Assault Support Helicopter Battalion	Operation Delaware	South Vietnam, A Shau Valley	Flight engineer on CH-47A #66-19063 hit by enemy fire and crashed on approach to Landing Zone Tiger, he jumped from the helicopter before it crashed	Presumptive finding of death
April 19	Wallace, Michael J	Sergeant First Class	US Army	B Company, 228th Assault Support Helicopter Battalion	Operation Delaware	South Vietnam, A Shau Valley	Crew chief on CH-47A #66-19063 hit by enemy fire, he jumped from the helicopter before it crashed	Presumptive finding of death
April 19	Wilburn, John E	Specialist	US Army	1st Battalion, 7th Cavalry Regiment	Operation Delaware	South Vietnam, A Shau Valley	Passenger on a UH-1D on an air assault mission, the helicopter was hit by enemy fire and began to spin throwing him out of the helicopter at an altitude of 3–4000 ft	Killed in action, body not recovered
April 20	Cestare, Joseph A	1st Lieutenant	USMC	VMO-2		South Vietnam, Quảng Nam Province	Pilot of UH-1E #152346 hit by enemy fire and crashed. SAR forces recovered the body of Corporal Cecil Parsons and partial remains from the wreckage	Killed in action, body not recovered
April 20	Walker, William J	Major	USMC	H&MS-16		South Vietnam, Quảng Nam Province	Copilot of UH-1E #152346 hit by enemy fire and crashed	Killed in action, body not recovered
April 20	Zutterman, Joseph A	Sergeant	USMC	VMO-2		South Vietnam, Quảng Nam Province	Gunner on UH-1E #152346 hit by enemy fire and crashed	Killed in action, body not recovered
April 21	Creamer, James E	Sergeant	US Army	17th Assault Helicopter Company, 10th Aviation Battalion	Operation Delaware	South Vietnam, Thừa Thiên Province	Passenger on UH-1H #66-16209 shot down while on a recovery mission to Firebase Veghel. The helicopter apparently exploded in midair, wreckage was located on 26 May but no recovery effort could be mounted due to strong enemy presence	Presumptive finding of death
April 21	Jamerson, Larry C	E4	US Army	17th AHC, 10th Aviation Battalion	Operation Delaware	South Vietnam, Thừa Thiên Province	Gunner on UH-1H #66-16209 shot down while on a recovery mission to LZ Veghel	Presumptive finding of death
April 21	Johnson, Frankie B	E5	US Army	17th AHC, 10th Aviation Battalion	Operation Delaware	South Vietnam, Thừa Thiên Province	Crew chief on UH-1H #66-16209 shot down while on a recovery mission to LZ Veghel	Presumptive finding of death
April 21	Link, Robert C	Warrant Officer	US Army	17th AHC, 10th Aviation Battalion	Operation Delaware	South Vietnam, Thừa Thiên Province	Copilot of UH-1H #66-16209 shot down while on a recovery mission to LZ Veghel	Presumptive finding of death
April 21	Mackedanz, Lyle E	Staff Sergeant	US Army	17th AHC, 10th Aviation Battalion	Operation Delaware	South Vietnam, Thừa Thiên Province	Passenger on UH-1H #66-16209 shot down while on a recovery mission to LZ Veghel	Presumptive finding of death
April 21	Olsen, Floyd W	Captain	US Army	17th AHC, 10th Aviation Battalion	Operation Delaware	South Vietnam, Thừa Thiên Province	Pilot of UH-1H #66-16209 shot down while on a recovery mission to LZ Veghel	Presumptive finding of death
April 21	Spindler, John G	2nd Lieutenant	USMC	2nd Battalion 3rd Marines		South Vietnam, Quảng Trị Province	Killed when a 122 mm round ignited the company's ammunition supplies which had been gathered for removal, no identifiable remains recovered	Killed in action, body not recovered
April 22	Chomyk, William	1st Lieutenant	USAF	389th Tactical Fighter Squadron		South Vietnam, Thừa Thiên Province	Pilot of F-4D #66‑8778 that crashed after making a bombing run	Killed in action, body not recovered
April 22	Riggins, Robert P	Major	USAF	389th Tactical Fighter Squadron		South Vietnam, Thừa Thiên Province	Bombardier/naviagtor on F-4D #66‑8778 that crashed after making a bombing run	Killed in action, body not recovered
April 22	Cooley, David L	Lieutenant Commander	US Navy	428th Tactical Fighter Squadron	Operation Combat Lancer	North Vietnam	On exchange duty from the Navy he was piloting F-111A #66-024 that disappeared on a solo night bombing mission	Presumptive finding of death
April 22	Palmgren, Edwin D	Lieutenant Colonel	USAF	428th Tactical Fighter Squadron	Operation Combat Lancer	North Vietnam	Copilot of F-111A #66-024 that disappeared on a solo night bombing mission	Presumptive finding of death
April 24	Crossman, Gregory J	1st Lieutenant	USAF	497th Tactical Fighter Squadron	Operation Rolling Thunder	North Vietnam, Quảng Bình Province	Weapons systems operator on F-4D #66-8736 shot down after attacking a SAM site.	Presumptive finding of death
April 25	Mitchell, Albert C	Major	USAF	497th Tactical Fighter Squadron	Operation Rolling Thunder	North Vietnam, Quảng Bình Province	Pilot of F-4D #66-8736 shot down after attacking a SAM site	Presumptive finding of death
April 25	Guillory, Hubia J	Private First Class	US Army	5th Battalion, 7th Cavalry Regiment	Operation Delaware	South Vietnam, Thừa Thiên Province	Killed when his company was ambushed on a patrol near LZ Tiger, his body could not be recovered due to heavy enemy fire	Killed in action, body not recovered
April 25	Kelley, Daniel M	Specialist	US Army	5th Battalion, 7th Cavalry Regiment	Operation Delaware	South Vietnam, Thừa Thiên Province	Killed when his company was ambushed on a patrol near LZ Tiger, his body could not be recovered due to heavy enemy fire	Killed in action, body not recovered
April 25	Scott, David L	Specialist	US Army	5th Battalion, 7th Cavalry Regiment	Operation Delaware	South Vietnam, Thừa Thiên Province	Killed when his company was ambushed on a patrol near LZ Tiger, his body could not be recovered due to heavy enemy fire	Killed in action, body not recovered
April 26	McDaniel, John L	Major	USAF	772d Tactical Airlift Squadron	Operation Delaware	South Vietnam, A Lưới Camp	Pilot of C-130B #60-0298 hit by enemy fire while on approach to A Lưới airfield, the aircraft crashed and burnt on the airfield, the remains of 5 of the 8 crewmen were recovered	Killed in action, body not recovered
April 26	Stow, Lilburn R	Major	USAF	772d Tactical Airlift Squadron	Operation Delaware	South Vietnam, A Luoi	Pilot of C-130B #60-0298 hit by enemy fire while on approach to A Lưới Camp, the aircraft crashed and burnt on the airfield	Killed in action, body not recovered
April 26	Todd, Larry R	Sergeant	USAF	772d Tactical Airlift Squadron	Operation Delaware	South Vietnam, A Luoi	Crewman on C-130B #60-0298 hit by enemy fire while on approach to A Lưới Camp, the aircraft crashed and burnt on the airfield	Killed in action, body not recovered
April 28	Bors, Joseph C	Captain	USAF	16th Tactical Reconnaissance Squadron		South Vietnam, Quảng Nam Province	Copilot of RF-4C #66-0398 that disappeared on a daytime photo-reconnaissance mission	Presumptive finding of death
April 28	Cook, William R	Major	USAF	16th Tactical Reconnaissance Squadron		South Vietnam, Quảng Nam Province	Pilot of RF-4C #66-0398 that disappeared on a daytime photo-reconnaissance mission	Presumptive finding of death
April 28	Saavedra, Robert	Commander	US Navy	VA-144, USS Kitty Hawk	Operation Rolling Thunder	North Vietnam, Hà Tĩnh Province	His A-4E # 151070 crashed while on a strafing run during a night interdiction mission, no ejection observed	Presumptive finding of death
April 30	Guillermin, Louis F	Captain	USAF	609th Air Commando Squadron	Operation Steel Tiger	Laos, Savannakhet Province	Copilot of A-26A lost on a night interdiction mission	Presumptive finding of death until 28 May 2013 when his remains were identified
April 30	Pietsch, Robert E	Captain	USAF	609th Air Commando Squadron	Operation Steel Tiger	Laos, Savannakhet Province	Pilot of A-26A lost on a night interdiction mission	Presumptive finding of death until 31 May 2013 when his remains were identified
April 30	Staehli, Bruce W	Lance Corporal	USMC	3rd Battalion 9th Marines		South Vietnam, Dong Ha	Disappeared during an attack on NVA positions near Cam Vu	Presumptive finding of death
May 1	Gervais, Donald P	Sergeant	US Army	1st Squadron, 9th Cavalry Regiment	Operation Delaware	South Vietnam, A Shau Valley	Gunner on OH-6A that crashed on a low-level visual reconnaissance mission. SAR forces were unable to approach the crash due to strong enemy presence	Presumptive finding of death until 16 May 2025 when he was accounted for
May 1	Martin, Richard D	Corporal	US Army	1st Squadron, 9th Cavalry Regiment	Operation Delaware	South Vietnam, A Shau Valley	Crew chief on OH-6A that crashed on a low-level visual reconnaissance mission	Presumptive finding of death
May 1	Whitmire, Warren T	Warrant Officer	US Army	1st Squadron, 9th Cavalry Regiment	Operation Delaware	South Vietnam, A Shau Valley	Pilot of OH-6A that crashed on a low-level visual reconnaissance mission	Presumptive finding of death
May 2	Englander, Lawrence J	Sergeant	US Army	Detachment A-109 (Thường Ðức), 5th Special Forces Group		South Vietnam, Quảng Nam Province	Adviser to a CIDG unit that encountered an entrenched NVA position, he was shot multiple times and left behind when the unit withdrew	Presumptive finding of death
May 3	Avery, Robert D	Lieutenant (LTJG)	USMC	VMA-533	Operation Rolling Thunder	North Vietnam, Quảng Bình Province	Bombardier/navigator on A-6A #154164 that was shot down on a night armed reconnaissance mission	Presumptive finding of death
May 3	Clem, Thomas D	Lieutenant (LTJG)	USMC	VMA-533	Operation Rolling Thunder	North Vietnam, Quảng Bình Province	Pilot of A-6A #154164 that was shot down on a night armed reconnaissance mission	Presumptive finding of death
May 3	Clark, Stephen W	Captain	USMC	VMFA-235		South Vietnam, Quảng Trị Province	His F-8E was hit by ground fire, crashed and burned	Killed in action, body not recovered
May 3	Terry, Oral R	Private First Class	US Army	1097th Transportation Company (Boat), 159th Transport Battalion		South Vietnam, Dinh Tuong Province	Radio operator on a maintenance boat, lost overboard during night watch	Presumptive finding of death
May 4	King, Paul C	Private First Class	US Army	RT Alabama, MACV-SOG		Laos, Saravane Province	Medic/radio operator on a 9-man reconnaissance mission that engaged in a running battle with NVA forces, he was shot dead when his team took defensive positions. Only one team member SSgt John Allen survived the battle and was extracted the following day	Killed in action, body not recovered
May 5	Kustigian, Michael J	Seaman Apprentice	US Navy	USS Long Beach		South Vietnam, South China Sea	Lost overboard	Presumptive finding of death
May 5	Mitchell, Harry E	Seaman Apprentice	US Navy	USS Long Beach		South Vietnam, South China Sea	Lost overboard	Presumptive finding of death
May 8	Condry, George T	Warrant Officer	US Army	281st Assault Helicopter Company	Operation Delaware	South Vietnam	Pilot of UH-1C #64-14172 that exploded in midair on a combat support mission. Unidentifiable remains of 4 bodies were located 4 days later but could not be recovered due to enemy fire	Killed in action, body not recovered
May 8	Dayton, James L	Warrant Officer	US Army	281st Assault Helicopter Company	Operation Delaware	South Vietnam	Aircraft commander on UH-1C #64-14172 that exploded in midair on a combat support mission	Killed in action, body not recovered
May 8	Jenne, Robert E	Specialist	US Army	281st Assault Helicopter Company	Operation Delaware	South Vietnam	Gunner on UH-1C #64-14172 that exploded in midair on a combat support mission	Killed in action, body not recovered
May 8	Jurecko, Daniel E	Specialist	US Army	281st Assault Helicopter Company	Operation Delaware	South Vietnam	Crew chief on UH-1C #64-14172 that exploded in midair on a combat support mission	Killed in action, body not recovered
May 9	Van Artsdalen, Clifford	E4	US Army	1st Battalion, 20th Infantry Regiment		South Vietnam, Quảng Tín Province	Shot in the head during an ambush, his body was left behind due to heavy enemy fire	Killed in action, body not recovered
May 10	Fleming, Horace H	1st Lieutenant	USMC	HMM-265	Battle of Ngok Tavak	South Vietnam, Quảng Tín Province	Pilot of CH-46A #151907 hit by enemy fire and crash-landed at Ngok Tavak. He attempted to escape the besieged camp by holding onto the skid of a hovering UH-1, but later fell along with 2 Nung soldiers from an altitude of 1000 feet	Presumptive finding of death
May 10	Perry, Thomas H	Corporal	US Army	Detachment A-105, 5th Special Forces Group	Battle of Ngok Tavak	South Vietnam, Quảng Tín Province	Disappeared during the withdrawal from Ngok Tavak	Presumptive finding of death
May 12	Coen, Harry B	Private First Class	US Army	2nd Battalion, 1st Infantry Regiment	Battle of Kham Duc	South Vietnam, Khâm Đức	Disappeared when NVA troops overran his bunker position on OP1	Presumptive finding of death
May 12	Craven, Andrew J	Private First Class	US Army	2nd Battalion, 1st Infantry Regiment	Battle of Kham Duc	South Vietnam, Khâm Đức	Shot multiple times as he withdrew from bunker position on OP1, his body was unable to be recovered due to enemy fire	Presumptive finding of death
May 12	Jimenez, Juan M	Sergeant	US Army	2nd Battalion, 1st Infantry Regiment	Battle of Kham Duc	South Vietnam, Khâm Đức	Killed by enemy mortar fire, his body was left behind during the evacuation	Killed in action, body not recovered
May 12	Sands, Richard E	Corporal	US Army	1st Battalion, 46th Infantry Regiment	Battle of Kham Duc	South Vietnam, Khâm Đức	Passenger on a CH-47 #67-18475, he was killed by enemy fire. The helicopter crash-landed on the runway, his body was examined but could not be removed before the helicopter caught fire	Killed in action, body not recovered
May 12	Simpson, Joseph L	Sergeant	US Army	2nd Battalion, 1st Infantry Regiment	Battle of Kham Duc	South Vietnam, Khâm Đức	Died of wounds as he attempted to evade capture after being left behind when the base was evacuated	Presumptive finding of death
May 12	Stuller, John C	Specialist 6	US Army	2nd Battalion, 1st Infantry Regiment	Battle of Kham Duc	South Vietnam, Khâm Đức	Killed by enemy fire as the NVA overran his bunker position on OP2	Killed in action, body not recovered
May 12	Widdison, Imlay S	Specialist	US Army	2nd Battalion, 1st Infantry Regiment	Battle of Kham Duc	South Vietnam, Khâm Đức	Killed by enemy fire as the NVA overran his bunker position on OP2	Killed in action, body not recovered
May 12	Widner, Danny L	Private First Class	US Army	2nd Battalion, 1st Infantry Regiment	Battle of Kham Duc	South Vietnam, Khâm Đức	Disappeared when NVA forces overran his bunker position on OP2	Presumptive finding of death
May 12	Williams, Roy C	Private First Class	US Army	2nd Battalion, 1st Infantry Regiment	Battle of Kham Duc	South Vietnam, Khâm Đức	Disappeared when NVA forces overran his bunker position on OP2	Presumptive finding of death
May 14	Cota, Ernest K	Petty Officer	US Navy	USS Harnett County		South Vietnam, Binh Thuy District	Lost overboard while returning from shore leave to his ship moored in the Bassac River	Killed in action, body not recovered
May 16	Crosson, Gerald J	1st Lieutenant	USAF	435th Tactical Fighter Squadron	Operation Rolling Thunder	North Vietnam, Quảng Bình Province	Weapons system operator on F-4D shot down on an armed reconnaissance mission, no ejection observed	Presumptive finding of death
May 16	Rickel, David J	Captain	USAF	435th Tactical Fighter Squadron	Operation Rolling Thunder	North Vietnam, Quảng Bình Province	Pilot of an F-4D shot down on an armed reconnaissance mission, no ejection observed	Presumptive finding of death
May 17	Young, Charles L	Private First Class	US Army	2nd Battalion, 27th Infantry Regiment		South Vietnam, Gia Định Province	Disappeared when his night boat patrol was ambushed	Presumptive finding of death
May 18	Gist, Tommy E	Captain	USAF	14th Tactical Reconnaissance Squadron	Operation Rolling Thunder	North Vietnam, Gulf of Tonkin	Weapons system operator on RF-4C #66-0442 hit by enemy fire on a daytime photo-reconnaissance mission near Đồng Hới. The pilot Capt Terry J Uyeyama ejected successfully and was captured	Presumptive finding of death
May 18	Padilla, David E	Lance Corporal	USMC	3rd Reconnaissance Battalion		South Vietnam, Quảng Trị Province	Died from multiple mortar wounds while on a reconnaissance patrol	Killed in action, body not recovered
May 19	Davies, Joseph E	Captain	USAF	497th Tactical Fighter Squadron	Operation Rolling Thunder	North Vietnam, Quảng Bình Province	Pilot of F-4D lost on a night armed reconnaissance mission. The remains of the weapons system operator 1LT Glenn D McCubbin were returned in January 1989	Presumptive finding of death
May 20	Robertson, John H	Sergeant First Class	US Army	C&C North, MACV-SOG		Laos, Saravane Province	Passenger on a Republic of Vietnam Air Force CH-34 medevac that was hit by enemy fire, crashed and exploded	Presumptive finding of death. In 2013 the documentary Unclaimed was released in which it was claimed that Robertson had been living in Vietnam for the last 40 years. The man claiming to be Robertson was actually Dang Tan Ngoc, "a 76-year-old Vietnamese citizen of French origin who has a history of pretending to be US army veterans"
May 22	Crews, John H	1st Lieutenant	USAF	433rd Tactical Fighter Squadron	Operation Rolling Thunder	North Vietnam, Quảng Bình Province	Pilot of F-4D #66-0246 hit by enemy fire and exploded on a night armed reconnaissance mission	Presumptive finding of death
May 22	Stpierre, Dean P	Captain	USAF	433rd Tactical Fighter Squadron	Operation Rolling Thunder	North Vietnam, Quảng Bình Province	Weapons system operator on F-4D #66-0246 hit by enemy fire and exploded on a night armed reconnaissance mission	Presumptive finding of death
May 23	Cochran, Isom C	Private First Class	US Army	3rd Battalion, 6th Artillery Regiment		South Vietnam, Pleiku Province	Drowned on patrol	Killed in action, body not recovered
May 23	Lane, Glen O	Sergeant First Class	US Army	RT Idaho, MACV-SOG		Laos, Saravane Province	Team leader of the 6 man RT Idaho all of whom disappeared following a battle with NVA forces	Presumptive finding of death
May 23	Owen, Robert D	Staff Sergeant	US Army	RT Idaho, MACV-SOG		Laos, Saravane Province	Assistant team leader of the 6 man RT Idaho all of whom disappeared following a battle with NVA forces	Presumptive finding of death
May 24	Rucker, Emmett	Lieutenant Colonel	USAF	12th Air Commando Squadron	Operation Ranch Hand	South Vietnam, South China Sea	Pilot of UC-123B #54-0588 shot down while on a Ranch Hand mission over Minh Hai Province and crashed at sea. The body of the flight engineer Sgt. Herbert E. Schmidt was recovered from the wreckage	Killed in action, body not recovered
May 24	Shanks, James L	Major	USAF	12th Air Commando Squadron	Operation Ranch Hand	South Vietnam, South China Sea	Copilot of UC-123B #54-0588 shot down while on a Ranch Hand mission and crashed at sea	Killed in action, body not recovered
May 28	Hill, Joseph A	Lance Corporal	USMC	1st Reconnaissance Battalion		South Vietnam, Quảng Nam Province	Rifleman on a reconnaissance patrol that was ambushed, his body was left behind when the team evacuated	Killed in action, body not recovered
May 30	Smith, Lewis P	1st Lieutenant	USAF	20th Tactical Air Support Squadron	Operation Steel Tiger	Laos, Saravane Province	Pilot of an O-2A shot down while on a FAC mission	Presumptive finding of death
May 31	Beresik, Eugene P	Major	USAF	44th Tactical Fighter Squadron	Operation Rolling Thunder	North Vietnam, Gulf of Tonkin	His F-105D #0409 was shot down and crashed at sea	Killed in action, body not recovered
May 31	Gatewood, Charles H	Lance Corporal	USMC	1st Battalion 1st Marines	Operation Scotland II	South Vietnam, Quảng Trị Province	Wounded in an ambush he disappeared when he moved from a temporary aid station to the landing zone for medical evacuation	Presumptive finding of death
June 4	Brice, Eric P	Lieutenant	US Navy	VF-33, USS America (CV-66)	Operation Rolling Thunder	North Vietnam, Gulf of Tonkin	Pilot of F-4J #155554 hit by enemy fire and headed out to sea, the radar intercept officer LTjg William A. Simmons ejected successfully, but Lt Brice's canopy failed to jettison	Killed in action, body not recovered
June 5	McManus, Truman J	Lance Corporal	USMC	1st Battalion 12th Marines		South Vietnam, Quảng Trị Province	Forward observer/radioman killed on patrol	Killed in action, body not recovered
June 7	Spencer, Dean C	Specialist	US Army	2nd Battalion, 12th Cavalry Regiment		South Vietnam, Thừa Thiên Province	Drowned while on patrol	Killed in action, body not recovered
June 9	Schmidt, Walter R	1st Lieutenant	USMC	VMA-121		South Vietnam, Thừa Thiên Province	His A-4E #151080 was shot down on a bombing mission over the A Shau Valley, he ejected successfully and contacted SAR forces advising that he had a broken leg. An HH-3E helicopter #67-14710, call sign Jolly Green 23 from the 37th Aerospace Rescue and Recovery Squadron was assigned to rescue him, but was shot down as it hovered and crashed killing all 4 crewmen. Ground forces were inserted to the crash sit on 10 June but were unable to locate 1LT Schmidt	Presumptive finding of death
June 16	Bowman, Frank	Quartermaster 2nd Class	US Navy	PCF-19, Coastal Division 12, TF-115	Operation Market Time	South Vietnam, South China Sea	Crewman on PCF-19 that exploded and sank on a night patrol mission near the DMZ, apparently in a friendly fire incident. Another crewman confirmed that QM2 Bowman was dead	Killed in action, body not recovered
June 16	Rupinski, Bernard F	1st Lieutenant	US Navy	VF-102, USS America	Operation Rolling Thunder	North Vietnam	Radar intercept officer on F-4J #155548 shot down by a Vietnam People's Air Force Mig. The pilot CDR Walter E. Wilber ejected successfully and was captured	Presumptive finding of death
June 23	Booth, James E	1st Lieutenant	USAF	497th Tactical Fighter Squadron	Operation Rolling Thunder	North Vietnam, Quảng Bình Province	Weapons system operator on F-4 #66-8724 that flew into terrain during an attack on a night armed reconnaissance mission	Presumptive finding of death
June 23	Casey, Donald F	Lieutenant Colonel	USAF	497th Tactical Fighter Squadron	Operation Rolling Thunder	North Vietnam, Quảng Bình Province	Pilot of F-4 #66-8724 that flew into terrain on a night armed reconnaissance mission	Presumptive finding of death
June 27	Giammerino, Vincent F	Private First Class	US Army	1st Battalion, 22nd Infantry Regiment		South Vietnam, Bình Định Province	Disappeared while on a bomb damage assessment patrol	Presumptive finding of death
June 28	Johns, Paul F	Major	USAF	6th Air Commando Squadron		Laos	His A-1H was shot down	Presumptive finding of death
June 29	Owen, Timothy S	Private First Class	US Army	1st Battalion, 503rd Infantry Regiment		South Vietnam, Bình Định Province	Disappeared while on a night ambush	Presumptive finding of death
July 2	Tipping, Henry A	Major	USAF	6th Air Commando Squadron		South Vietnam, Quảng Trị Province	His A-1H was hit by enemy fire while on an SAR mission and crashed, no ejection observed	Presumptive finding of death
July 5	Dewberry, Jerry D	Lance Corporal	USMC	1st Battalion, 1st Marines	Operation Scotland II	South Vietnam, Quảng Trị Province	His patrol was ambushed and he was killed, his body was left behind as his company withdrew	Killed in action, body not recovered
July 6	Mahoney, Thomas P	Private First Class	USMC	1st Battalion, 1st Marines	Operation Scotland II	South Vietnam, Quảng Trị Province	Shot and killed while on patrol on Hill 881-South. His body could not be recovered due to heavy enemy fire	Killed in action, body not recovered
July 13	Bird, Leonard A	1st Lieutenant	USMC	VMFA-115		South Vietnam, Quảng Trị Province	Radar intercept officer on F-4B #150650 hit by ground fire and crashed on a close air support mission, no ejection observed	Killed in action, body not recovered
July 13	Hurst, John C	Captain	USMC	VMFA-115		South Vietnam	Pilot of F-4B #150650 hit by ground fire and crashed on a close air support mission, no ejection observed	Killed in action, body not recovered
July 17	Cross, Ariel L	1st Lieutenant	USMC	VMCJ-1		South Vietnam, Quảng Trị Province	Copilot of EF-10B #125793	Presumptive finding of death
July 17	Parra, Lionel	Captain	USMC	VMCJ-1		South Vietnam, Quảng Trị Province	Pilot of EF-10B #125793	Presumptive finding of death
July 18	Seablom, Earl F	Private First Class	US Army	34th Engineer Battalion		South Vietnam, Bình Dương Province	Stepped on a mine during a road-clearing operation, no recoverable remains	Killed in action, body not recovered
July 21	Flanagan, Sherman E	Lieutenant Colonel	USAF	355th Tactical Fighter Squadron		South Vietnam, Thừa Thiên Province	Pilot of F-100D #56-2905 hit by ground fire while attacking an anti-aircraft position, no ejection observed	Killed in action, body not recovered
July 21	Willing, Edward A	Lance Corporal	USMC	2nd Battalion 13th Marines		South Vietnam, Quảng Nam Province	Disappeared while returning to his observation post near the Tu Cau bridge	Presumptive finding of death
July 23	Gosen, Lawrence D	Lieutenant Commander	US Navy	VA-33, USS Ticonderoga		North Vietnam, Gulf of Tonkin	His A-4F #154189 ditched after launch	Killed in action, body not recovered
July 24	Bush, John R	1st Lieutenant	USAF	497th Tactical Fighter Squadron	Operation Rolling Thunder	North Vietnam, Gulf of Tonkin	Weapons system operator on F-4D #66‑7682 hit by enemy fire on a night armed reconnaissance mission and crashed inverted into the sea	Presumptive finding of death
July 24	Hackett, Harley B	Captain	USAF	497th Tactical Fighter Squadron	Operation Rolling Thunder	North Vietnam, Gulf of Tonkin	Pilot of F-4D #66‑7682 hit by enemy fire on a night armed reconnaissance mission and crashed inverted into the sea	Presumptive finding of death
July 24	Greiling, David S	Lieutenant Commander	US Navy	VA-82, USS America	Operation Rolling Thunder	North Vietnam, Quảng Bình Province	His A-7A was hit by enemy fire and crashed on a night armed reconnaissance mission	Presumptive finding of death
July 25	Parish, Charles C	Lieutenant	US Navy	VF-102, USS America	Operation Rolling Thunder	North Vietnam, Vinh	Pilot of F-4J #155540 that was hit by enemy fire and exploded in midair on a daytime armed reconnaissance mission. The radar intercept officer Lt. Robert S. Fant ejected successfully and was captured	Presumptive finding of death
July 27	Fullerton, Frank E	Lieutenant Commander	US Navy	VA-93, USS Bon Homme Richard	Operation Rolling Thunder	North Vietnam, Hà Tĩnh Province	His A-4F 154182 was shot down on a night road reconnaissance mission	Presumptive finding of death
July 27	Patton, Ward K	Petty Officer	US Navy	YRBM-18		South Vietnam, Cho Lach	Drowned while returning to his ship anchored on the Mỹ Tho River	Killed in action, body not recovered
July 29	Auxier, Jerry E	Staff Sergeant	US Army	1st Battalion, 46th Infantry Regiment		South Vietnam, Quảng Tín Province	Killed by a command detonated mine, no remains recoverable	Killed in action, body not recovered
August 1	Fowler, Donald R	E4	US Army	240th Assault Helicopter Company		South Vietnam, Song Be Province	Gunner on UH-1C #66-15154 that crashed in bad weather. The wreckage was located on 6 August 1971 and partial remains of the pilot WO W Fernan were recovered	Presumptive finding of death
August 1	Russell, Peter J	1st Lieutenant	US Army	240th Assault Helicopter Company		South Vietnam, Song Be Province	Pilot of UH-1C #66-15154 that crashed in bad weather	Presumptive finding of death
August 1	Hastings, Steven M	Sergeant	US Army	240th Assault Helicopter Company		South Vietnam, Song Be Province	Crew chief on UH-1C #66-15154 that crashed in bad weather	Presumptive finding of death
August 1	Ross, Joseph S	1st Lieutenant	USAF	389th Tactical Fighter Squadron	Operation Rolling Thunder	North Vietnam, Quảng Bình Province	Weapons system operator on F-4D #66‑8822 that crashed while on a night armed reconnaissance mission	Presumptive finding of death
August 1	Thompson, William J	Major	USAF	389th Tactical Fighter Squadron	Operation Rolling Thunder	North Vietnam, Quảng Bình Province	Pilot of F-4D #66‑8822 that crashed while on a night armed reconnaissance mission	Presumptive finding of death
August 9	Wolfkeil, Wayne B	Major	USAF	6th Special Operations Squadron	Operation Steel Tiger	Laos, Attapeu Province	His A-1H spun out of control and crashed, no ejection observed	Presumptive finding of death
August 15	Hicks, Terrin D	Captain	USAF	14th Tactical Reconnaissance Squadron	Operation Rolling Thunder	North Vietnam, Quảng Bình Province	Pilot of RF-4C #66-0447 shot down on a photo-reconnaissance mission. Both crewmen ejected successfully and he was apparently shot while evading capture. The copilot Capt. Joseph F. Shanahan was captured	Presumptive finding of death
August 16	McElhanon, Michael O	Major	USAF	309th Tactical Fighter Squadron	Operation Rolling Thunder	North Vietnam, Đồng Hới	Pilot of F-100F #56-3865 lost on a Misty FAC mission	Presumptive finding of death
August 16	Overlock, John F	Major	USAF	309th Tactical Fighter Squadron	Operation Rolling Thunder	North Vietnam	Copilot of F-100F #56-3865 lost on a Misty FAC mission	Presumptive finding of death
August 19	Graniela, Jose A	Private First Class	US Army	1st Battalion, 327th Infantry Regiment		South Vietnam, Thừa Thiên Province	Killed by sniper fire during an ambush, his body was left behind when his unit withdrew	Killed in action, body not recovered
August 19	Collins, Theothis	Lance Corporal	USMC	2nd Battalion, 1st Marines		South Vietnam, Thừa Thiên Province	Disappeared in a mine explosion while assisting in the rescue of the crew of a downed helicopter	Killed in action, body not recovered
August 20	Lindbloom, Charles D	Photographer 2nd Class	US Navy	VAP-62		South Vietnam	Passenger on a VAP-61 RA-3B on an R&R flight to Bangkok. The RA-3B went out of control at 25,000 ft and the 3 passengers bailed out. Only two chutes were observed and two men were recovered. At 10,000 ft the pilot recovered control of the RA-3B and flew it back to DaNang	Killed in action, body not recovered
August 22	Acosta-Rosario, Humberto	Private First Class	US Army	1st Battalion, 5th Infantry Regiment		South Vietnam, Tây Ninh Province	Disappeared when his unit was ambushed while on patrol in the Ben Cui Rubber Plantation	Presumptive finding of death
August 23	Bergevin, Charles L	1st Lieutenant	USAF	14th Tactical Reconnaissance Squadron	Operation Rolling Thunder	North Vietnam, Quảng Bình Province	Weapons system operator on an RF-4C #66‑0466 that disappeared on a night photo-reconnaissance mission	Presumptive finding of death
August 23	Setterquist, Francis L	1st Lieutenant	USAF	14th Tactical Reconnaissance Squadron	Operation Rolling Thunder	North Vietnam, Quảng Bình Province	Pilot of RF-4C #66‑0466 that disappeared on a night photo-reconnaissance mission	Presumptive finding of death
August 23	Ferguson, Walter	Private First Class	US Army	1st Battalion, 2nd Infantry Regiment		South Vietnam, Loc Ninh	Disappeared during an ambush, captured by the Viet Cong he was shot while trying to escape in May 1970	Died in captivity, remains not returned
August 24	Heep, William A	Lieutenant	US Navy	VF-143, USS Constellation		North Vietnam, Gulf of Tonkin	His F-4B #150434 ditched after launch, the radar intercept officer Lt (LTJG) T.L. McPherson was rescued	Killed in action, body not recovered
August 24	Ladewig, Melvin E	1st Lieutenant	USAF	497th Tactical Fighter Squadron	Operation Rolling Thunder	North Vietnam, Quảng Bình Province	Weapons system officer on F-4D #66‑8694 that crashed while making an attack during a night strike and armed reconnaissance mission, no ejection observed	Presumptive finding of death
August 24	Read, Charles H	Major	USAF	497th Tactical Fighter Squadron	Operation Rolling Thunder	North Vietnam, Quảng Bình Province	Pilot of F-4D #66‑8694 that crashed while on a night strike and armed reconnaissance mission	Presumptive finding of death
August 27	Pick, Donald W	Major	USAF	480th Tactical Fighter Squadron		South Vietnam, South China Sea	Pilot of F-4D #66‑7531 which was hit by ground fire and crashed at sea, the weapons system officer 1Lt Samuel F Wilburn ejected successfully	Killed in action, body not recovered
August 28	Ashall, Alan F	Lieutenant (LTJG)	US Navy	VA-85, USS America	Operation Rolling Thunder	North Vietnam, Vinh	Bombardier/navigator on A-6B #151561 lost on a night Iron Hand mission	Presumptive finding of death
August 28	Duncan, Robert R	Lieutenant (LTJG)	US Navy	VA-85, USS America	Operation Rolling Thunder	North Vietnam, Vinh	Pilot of A-6B #151561 lost on a night Iron Hand mission	Presumptive finding of death
August 28	Miller, Robert C	Major	USAF	Detachment 1, 56th Special Operations Wing		Laos, Vientiane Province	Pilot of T-28D that crashed in the Mekong River	Killed in action, body not recovered
August 28	Phillips, Elbert A	Technical Sergeant	USAF	Detachment 1, 56th Special Operations Wing		Laos, Vientiane Province	Passenger on T-28D that crashed in the Mekong River	Killed in action, body not recovered
August 31	Bartocci, John E	Lieutenant Commander	US Navy	VF-24, USS Hancock		South Vietnam, South China Sea	His F-8H #147897 crashed during a night carrier landing	Killed in action, body not recovered
September 1	Kinkade, William L	1st Lieutenant	USAF	555th Tactical Fighter Squadron	Operation Rolling Thunder	North Vietnam, Bình Định Province	Weapons system operator on F-4D #66‑8688 hit by ground fire on a night armed reconnaissance mission. The pilot CPT J Wilson ejected successfully and was rescued	Presumptive finding of death
September 3	Frazier, Paul R	Sergeant	US Army	191st Assault Helicopter Company		South Vietnam, Quảng Nam Province	Door gunner on UH-1C #66-66613 hit by ground fire, crashed and exploded on impact. The remains of the other crewmembers were recovered by SAR forces	Killed in action, body not recovered
September 5	Posey, George R	Engineman/Fireman	US Navy	Naval Support Activity Da Nang		South Vietnam, South China Sea	Crewman on USS Manhattan, washed overboard during typhoon near Da Nang harbour	Killed in action, body not recovered
September 6	Deichelmann, Samuel M	Captain	USAF	Detachment 1, 56th Special Operations Wing		South Vietnam, Long Khánh Province	Pilot of an O-1F that disappeared	Presumptive finding of death
September 8	Pridemore, Dallas R	Staff Sergeant	US Army	D Company, 87th Infantry Regiment, 95th Military Police Battalion		South Vietnam, Thu Đức District	Captured by Viet Cong while off duty. Last seen alive in Svay Rieng Province, Cambodia in January 1969	Presumptive finding of death
September 12	Shark, Earl E	Sergeant	US Army	1st Battalion, 28th Infantry Regiment		South Vietnam, Lộc Ninh	Shot and wounded during an ambush, his unit withdrew leaving him behind. When US forces returned to the area they were unable to locate his body and the Viet Cong later reported that he was captured and died from his wounds	Died in captivity, remains not returned
September 17	Davis, Edgar F	Captain	USAF	11th Tactical Reconnaissance Squadron	Operation Steel Tiger	Laos, Savannakhet Province	Weapons system operator on RF-4C #65‑0915 that was shot down on a photo-reconnaissance mission. The pilot Capt l.L. Paul ejected successfully and was rescued	Presumptive finding of death until 18 January 2018 when he was accounted for
September 24	Breiner, Stephen E	Private First Class	USMC	1st Combat Engineer Battalion		South Vietnam, Quảng Nam Province	Drowned while crossing the Thu Bon River	Killed in action, body not recovered
September 24	McConnell, Jerry	Private	US Army	266th Service and Supply Battalion		South Vietnam, Quảng Trị Province	Drowned while swimming in the Cua Viet River	Killed in action, body not recovered
September 28	Dixon, David L	Machinist 3rd Class	US Navy	Naval Support Activity Da Nang		South Vietnam, Cua Viet River	Disappeared during the explosion and fire aboard an LCM-6	Killed in action, body not recovered
September 28	Halpin, David P	Fireman	US Navy	Naval Support Activity Da Nang		South Vietnam, Cua Viet River	Disappeared during the explosion and fire aboard an LCM-6	Killed in action, body not recovered
September 29	Callahan, David F	Lieutenant Commander	US Navy	VA-106, USS Intrepid		North Vietnam, Gulf of Tonkin	His A-4E #152091 crashed into the rear of the carrier while on a landing approach, dropped into the sea and sank	Killed in action, body not recovered
September 29	Newberry, Wayne E	Captain	USAF	6th Special Operations Squadron	Operation Steel Tiger	Laos, Savannakhet Province	His A-1H #52-135305 was hit by enemy fire on an attack run, no ejection observed	Killed in action, body not recovered
September 29	Olson, Barry A	Private First Class	US Army	2nd Battalion, 8th Infantry Regiment		South Vietnam, Đắk Lắk province	Disappeared when the APC he was riding on top of was hit by an enemy rocket causing mines and grenades to explode	Presumptive finding of death
September 30	Fieszel, Clifford W	Captain	USAF	333rd Tactical Fighter Squadron	Operation Rolling Thunder	North Vietnam, Quảng Bình Province	Pilot of F-105F #63-8317 shot down on a Wild Weasel mission	Presumptive finding of death
September 30	Smith, Howard H	Major	USAF	333rd Tactical Fighter Squadron	Operation Rolling Thunder	North Vietnam, Quảng Bình Province	Weapons system operator on F-105F #63-8317 shot down on a Wild Weasel mission	Presumptive finding of death
September 30	Spinelli, Domenick A	Lieutenant	US Navy	VA-196, USS Constellation	Operation Rolling Thunder	North Vietnam	Navigator/bombardier on A-6A #154149 hit by a SAM while on a night armed reconnaissance mission. The remains of the pilot Lieutenant (LTJG) Larry J. VanRenselaar were returned in 1989	Presumptive finding of death
October 5	Stride, James D	Staff Sergeant	US Army	RT Alabama, MACV-SOG		Laos, Savannakhet Province	Team leader of RT Alabama, killed by enemy fire shortly after insertion on a reconnaissance mission	Killed in action, body not recovered
October 5	Lawrence, Gregory P	Sergeant	USAF	37th Aerospace Rescue and Recovery Squadron		Laos, Savannakhet Province	Flight engineer on Jolly Green 10, HH-3E #65-12782 that was shot down and exploded while extracting MACV-SOG team RT Alabama	Killed in action, body not recovered
October 5	Wester, Albert D	Major	USAF	37th Aerospace Rescue and Recovery Squadron		Laos, Savannakhet Province	Copilot of Jolly Green 10, HH-3E #65-12782 that was shot down and exploded	Killed in action, body not recovered
October 10	Handrahan, Eugene A	Specialist	US Army	2nd Battalion, 12th Infantry Regiment		South Vietnam, Hậu Nghĩa Province	Wounded during an ambush he was left behind when his unit withdrew and the area was subsequently targeted with artillery fire and air support	Presumptive finding of death
October 10	Herreid, Robert D	Sergeant	US Army	Detachment A-402, Company D, 5th Special Forces Group		South Vietnam, Châu Đốc	Shot during an ambush he was left behind as his unit withdrew	Presumptive finding of death
October 13	Hunt, James D	Lieutenant	US Navy	VA-52, USS Coral Sea	Operation Rolling Thunder	North Vietnam, Gulf of Tonkin	Bombardier/navigator on A-6A #154141 that disappeared following an armed reconnaissance mission	Presumptive finding of death
October 13	Orell, Quinlan R	Commander	US Navy	VA-52, USS Coral Sea	Operation Rolling Thunder	North Vietnam, Gulf of Tonkin	Pilot of A-6A #154141 that disappeared following an armed reconnaissance mission	Presumptive finding of death
October 17	Mason, James P	Specialist 5	US Army	1st Battalion, 502nd Infantry Regiment		South Vietnam, South China Sea	Passenger on OH-6A #67-16224 that crashed after takeoff from the USS Eversole	Killed in action, body not recovered
October 21	Finley, Dickie W	Private First Class	US Army	D Company, 58th Infantry Regiment		South Vietnam, Đắk Lắk province	Member of a long range reconnaissance patrol, left behind when his team was evacuated by helicopter	Presumptive finding of death
October 21	Knabb, Kenneth K	Lieutenant	US Navy	VA-106, USS Intrepid	Operation Rolling Thunder	North Vietnam, Hà Tĩnh Province	His A-4E #151160 was hit by enemy fire and exploded in midair	Presumptive finding of death
October 24	Tyler, George E	Major	USAF	390th Tactical Fighter Squadron	Operation Rolling Thunder	North Vietnam	Pilot of F-4D #66‑0264 hit by ground fire. The weapons system operator 1Lt Darrell L Richardson ejected successfully and was rescued	Presumptive finding of death
October 25	Thompson, Benjamin A	Staff Sergeant	US Army	3rd Battalion, 47th Infantry Regiment		South Vietnam, Kien Hoa Province	Drowned while on patrol	Killed in action, body not recovered
October 28	Connor, Charles R	Major	USMC	Marine Aviation Logistics Squadron 13		South Vietnam, South China Sea	Pilot of TA-4F that disappeared while returning to Chu Lai after a Fast FAC mission over the DMZ	Presumptive finding of death
October 28	Ricker, William E	Lieutenant	US Navy	Marine Aviation Logistics Squadron 13		South Vietnam, South China Sea	Pilot exchange officer on TA-4F that disappeared while returning to Chu Lai after a Fast FAC mission over the DMZ	Presumptive finding of death
October 28	Stonebraker, Kenneth A	Captain	USAF	11th Tactical Reconnaissance Squadron	Operation Rolling Thunder	North Vietnam, Quảng Bình Province	Weapons system operator on RF-4C #65‑0846 that disappeared on a photo-reconnaissance mission	Presumptive finding of death
October 28	Stroven, William H	Captain	USAF	11th Tactical Reconnaissance Squadron	Operation Rolling Thunder	North Vietnam, Quảng Bình Province	Pilot of RF-4C #65‑0846 that disappeared on a photo-reconnaissance mission	Presumptive finding of death
October 29	Bezold, Steven N	1st Lieutenant	US Army	2nd Battalion, 94th Artillery Regiment		North Vietnam, Quảng Bình province	Observer on O-1G #57-6027 flying an artillery adjustment mission over the DMZ hit by enemy fire and crashed	Presumptive finding of death
October 29	Harrison, Donald L	Captain	US Army	212th Aviation Battalion		North Vietnam, Quảng Bình province	Pilot of O-1G #57-6027 flying an artillery adjustment mission over the DMZ hit by enemy fire and crashed	Presumptive finding of death
October 29	Hunter, James D	Private First Class	US Army	1st Battalion, 506th Infantry Regiment		South Vietnam, Thừa Thiên Province	Drowned while swimming	Killed in action, body not recovered
October 31	Swanson, Roger W	Private First Class	US Army	1st Battalion, 2nd Infantry Regiment		South Vietnam, Tây Ninh Province	Wounded during an ambush he was left behind when his unit withdrew and the area was later targeted with artillery fire	Presumptive finding of death
November 1	Kenney, Harry J	Engineman Third Class	US Navy	River Assault Squadron 11		South Vietnam, Mỹ Tho	Disappeared after a Viet Cong mine exploded next to the USS Westchester County (LST-1167)	Killed in action, body not recovered
November 5	Simpson, James E	Civilian	Decca Navigation Systems Inc			South Vietnam, Bình Thuận Province	Captured while driving south of Phan Rang and killed while trying to escape several days later	Died in captivity, remains not returned
November 6	Turner, Frederick R	Lance Corporal	USMC	Marine Air Support Squadron 3		South Vietnam, Quảng Ngãi Province	Killed by enemy rocket fire while on a PBR	Killed in action, body not recovered
November 13	Erskine, Jack D	Civilian	Geotronics Company			South Vietnam, Bình Thuận Province	Captured by Viet Cong while driving a jeep on Highway 1	Prisoner
November 15	Birchim, James D	1st Lieutenant	US Army	RT New Hampshire, MACV-SOG		South Vietnam, Kon Tum Province	Leader of an 8 man long-range reconnaissance patrol that was extracted by McGuire rig following an ambush. He fell from the helicopter at an altitude of 2500 feet	Killed in action, body not recovered
November 16	Copley, William M	Specialist	US Army	RT Vermont, MACV-SOG		Laos, Attopeu Province	Shot and mortally wounded when RT Vermont was ambushed, he was left behind when his team was extracted	Presumptive finding of death
November 16	Wiechert, Robert C	Major	USAF	615th Tactical Fighter Squadron		South Vietnam, South China Sea	His F-100D #56‑3446 crashed at sea	Killed in action, body not recovered
November 17	Derby, Paul D	Captain	USMC	VMFA-115		South Vietnam, Quảng Ngãi Province	Pilot of F-4B #149456 shot down	Killed in action, body not recovered
November 25	San Francisco, Dewayne	1st Lieutenant	USAF	555th Tactical Fighter Squadron	Operation Rolling Thunder	North Vietnam, Quảng Bình Province	Weapons system operator on F-4D #66-7523 shot down on an armed reconnaissance mission, both crewmen ejected successfully and contacted SAR forces	Presumptive finding of death
November 25	Morrison, Joseph C	Major	USAF	555th Tactical Fighter Squadron	Operation Rolling Thunder	North Vietnam, Quảng Bình Province	Pilot of F-4D #66-7523 shot down on an armed reconnaissance mission, both crewmen ejected successfully and contacted SAR forces	Presumptive finding of death
November 27	Stuifbergen, Gene P	Staff Sergeant	USAF	20th Special Operations Squadron		Cambodia, Ratanakiri Province	Flight mechanic on UH-1F Huey #65-07942 shot down while inserting a 6-man US/ARVN Special Forces team, the helicopter crashed and burst into flames, the 2 pilots and 2 US special forces soldiers survived the crash	Killed in action, body not recovered
December 5	Berry, John A	Warrant Officer	US Army	1st Brigade, 1st Cavalry Division		South Vietnam, Tây Ninh Province	Pilot of OH-6A #67-16341 hit by enemy fire crashed and burned on a low-level reconnaissance mission	Killed in action, body not recovered
December 5	Evans, Billy K	Sergeant	US Army	1st Brigade, 1st Cavalry Division		South Vietnam, Tây Ninh Province	Observer/gunner on OH-6A #67-16341 hit by enemy fire crashed and burned on a low-level reconnaissance mission	Killed in action, body not recovered
December 6	Morales, Frank A	Civilian				South Vietnam		Presumptive finding of death
December 8	Pirruccello, Joseph S	Captain	USAF	602nd Special Operations Squadron		Laos, Sam Neua Province	His A-1E was hit by enemy fire and crashed while flying air support for a rescue mission	Killed in action, body not recovered
December 9	Ford, Edward	Sergeant	US Army	B Company, 65th Engineer Battalion		South Vietnam, Hậu Nghĩa Province	Member of a mine-sweeping team that detonated an anti-tank mine, no identifiable remains recovered	Killed in action, body not recovered
December 9	Shimek, Samuel D	Specialist	US Army	5th Battalion, 7th Cavalry Regiment		South Vietnam, Bình Long Province	Grenadier killed in an ambush when the 40mm grenades he was carrying were exploded by enemy fire, his body was left behind when his unit withdrew	Killed in action, body not recovered
December 9	Minor, Carrol W	Seaman	US Navy	Detachment Cua Viet, Naval Support Activity Da Nang		South Vietnam, Cua Viet	Killed by artillery fire	Killed in action, body not recovered
December 11	Galbraith, Russell D	Captain	USAF	11th Tactical Reconnaissance Squadron	Operation Steel Tiger	Laos, Savannakhet Province	Weapons system operator on RF-4C #65-0820 shot down on a night photo reconnaissance mission, the pilot Captain Harlan Drewry ejected and was rescued by SAR forces	Presumptive finding of death
December 13	Albright, John S	1st Lieutenant	USAF	606th Special Operations Squadron	Operation Steel Tiger	Laos, Savannakhet Province	Navigator on C-123K that collided with a B-57B on a night forward air control mission, only the pilot 1Lt Thomas M. Turner escaped the aircraft	Presumptive finding of death
December 13	Clarke, Fred L	Technical Sergeant	USAF	606th Special Operations Squadron	Operation Steel Tiger	Laos, Savannakhet Province	Loadmaster on C-123K that collided with a B-57B on a night forward air control mission	Presumptive finding of death
December 13	Dailey, Douglas V	Staff Sergeant	USAF	606th Special Operations Squadron	Operation Steel Tiger	Laos, Savannakhet Province	Flight engineer on C-123K that collided with a B-57B on a night forward air control mission	Presumptive finding of death
December 13	Donahue, Morgan J	1st Lieutenant	USAF	606th Special Operations Squadron	Operation Steel Tiger	Laos, Savannakhet Province	Navigator on C-123K that collided with a B-57B on a night forward air control mission	Presumptive finding of death
December 13	Fanning, Joseph P	1st Lieutenant	USAF	606th Special Operations Squadron	Operation Steel Tiger	Laos, Savannakhet Province	Copilot on C-123K that collided with a B-57B on a night forward air control mission	Presumptive finding of death
December 13	Walker, Samuel F	Staff Sergeant	USAF	606th Special Operations Squadron	Operation Steel Tiger	Laos, Savannakhet Province	Loadmaster on C-123K that collided with a B-57B on a night forward air control mission	Presumptive finding of death
December 13	Dugan, Thomas W	Major	USAF	8th Bombardment Squadron	Operation Steel Tiger	Laos, Savannakhet Province	Pilot of B-57B that collided with a C-123K forward air control aircraft while on a night interdiction mission	Presumptive finding of death
December 13	McGouldrick, Francis J	Major	USAF	8th Bombardment Squadron	Operation Steel Tiger	Laos, Savannakhet Province	Copilot of B-57B that collided with a C-123K forward air control aircraft while on a night interdiction mission	Listed as presumptive finding of death until 6 September 2013 when his remains were identified
December 20	Bouchard, Michael L	Lieutenant	US Navy	VA-196, USS Constellation	Operation Steel Tiger	Laos, Savannakhet Province	Pilot of A-6A #154152 shot down on a night interdiction mission. The bombardier/navigator Lt Robert W. Colyar ejected and was rescued	Presumptive finding of death
December 20	Kent, Robert D	Captain	USMC	VMFA-314	Operation Steel Tiger	Laos, Savannakhet Province	Pilot of F-4B #149427 shot down on a night interdiction mission	Presumptive finding of death
December 20	Morin, Richard G	1st Lieutenant	USMC	VMFA-314	Operation Steel Tiger	Laos, Savannakhet Province	Bombardier/navigator on F-4B #149427 shot down on a night interdiction mission	Presumptive finding of death
December 24	Brownlee, Charles R	Major	USAF	357th Tactical Fighter Squadron	Operation Steel Tiger	Laos, Khammouane Province	His F-105D #62-4234 was hit by enemy fire and exploded as he ejected. His body was located by SAR forces the following day but could not be recovered due to enemy fire	Presumptive finding of death
December 25	King, Charles D	Airman First Class	USAF	40th Aerospace Rescue and Recovery Squadron		Laos, Khammouane Province	Pararescueman dropped in to recover the body of Major Charles Brownlee, he was hit by enemy fire and left behind when the rescue hoist broke as HH-3E #64-14230 evaded enemy fire	Presumptive finding of death
December 29	Scherdin, Robert F	Private First Class	US Army	FOB 2, CCN, MACV-SOG		Cambodia, Ratanakiri Province	Mortally wounded during an ambush in the Tri-Border area he was left behind when his team withdrew. SFC Robert L. Howard was awarded the Medal of Honor while on an SAR mission for PFC Scherdin the following day	Presumptive finding of death
December 30	McCants, Leland S	1st Lieutenant	US Army	3rd Battalion, 34th Artillery Regiment		South Vietnam, Kien Hoa Province	Artillery forward observer, drowned while trying to rescue a soldier who fell into a river	Killed in action, body not recovered

== 1969 ==
Date missing	Surname, First name(s)	Rank	Service	Unit	Operation/Battle Name	Location	Circumstances of loss	Recovery status
January 1	Clack, Cecil J	Private First Class	US Army	1st Battalion, 35th Infantry Regiment		South Vietnam, Pleiku Province	Drowned while on patrol	Killed in action, body not recovered
January 4	Lane, Mitchell S	Captain	USAF	188th Tactical Fighter Squadron		South Vietnam, Khánh Hòa Province	His F-100C disappeared in bad weather on a morning flight from Tuy Hoa Air Base	Presumptive finding of death
January 4	Neeld, Bobby G	Major	USAF	188th Tactical Fighter Squadron		South Vietnam, Khánh Hòa Province	His F-100C disappeared in bad weather on a morning flight from Tuy Hoa Air Base	Presumptive finding of death
January 7	Welsh, Larry D	Staff Sergeant	US Army	3rd Battalion, 22nd Infantry Regiment		South Vietnam, Tây Ninh Province	Wounded and disappeared following a Viet Cong ambush	Presumptive finding of death
January 9	Byrd, Hugh M	Captain	US Army	220th Aviation Company, 212th Aviation Brigade		South Vietnam, Quảng Trị Province	Pilot of O-1G #51-5059 that disappeared in bad weather while returning from a visual reconnaissance mission near Khe Sanh Combat Base	Presumptive finding of death
January 9	O'Brien, Kevin	1st Lieutenant	US Army	2nd Battalion, 94th Artillery Regiment		South Vietnam	Artillery observer on O-1G #51-5059 that disappeared while returning from a visual reconnaissance mission near Khe Sanh Combat Base	Presumptive finding of death
January 10	Sprott, Arthur R	Major	USAF	6th Special Operations Squadron		South Vietnam, Quảng Nam Province	His A-1H was hit by enemy fire and crashed on a rescue mission	Killed in action, body not recovered
January 17	Fickler, Edwin J	Captain	USMC	H&MS 11		South Vietnam, A Shau Valley	Pilot of A-6A #152586 shot down on a night strike mission	Presumptive finding of death
January 17	Kuhlman, Robert J	1st Lieutenant	USMC	VMA-242		South Vietnam, A Shau Valley	Bombardier/navigator on A-6A #152586 shot down on a night strike mission	Presumptive finding of death
January 17	Smith, Victor A	Captain	USAF	390th Tactical Fighter Squadron	Operation Steel Tiger	Laos, Savannakhet Province	Pilot of F-4D #66-8773 shot down on a single aircraft Forward Air Control/visual reconnaissance mission. The weapons system operator Lt James R Fegan ejected successfully and was rescued	Presumptive finding of death
January 26	Singleton, Daniel E	1st Lieutenant	USAF	469th Tactical Fighter Squadron	Operation Steel Tiger	Laos, Savannakhet Province	Weapons system operator on F-4E #67‑0286 hit by enemy fire, no ejection observed	Presumptive finding of death
January 26	Utley, Russel K	Major	USAF	469th Tactical Fighter Squadron	Operation Steel Tiger	Laos, Savannakhet Province	Pilot of F-4E #67‑0286 hit by enemy fire, no ejection observed	Presumptive finding of death
January 27	Conger, John E	Private First Class	US Army	3rd Battalion, 7th Infantry Regiment		South Vietnam, Long An Province	Wounded and left behind when his unit was ambushed. The area was later shelled and then secured but no remains were recovered.	Presumptive finding of death
January 29	Campbell, William E	Major	USAF	497th Tactical Fighter Squadron	Operation Steel Tiger	Laos, Mu Gia Pass	Pilot of F-4D #66-7474 shot down on a daytime bombing mission, no ejection observed	Presumptive finding of death until May 2017 when his remains were identified
January 29	Holton, Robert E	Captain	USAF	497th Tactical Fighter Squadron	Operation Steel Tiger	Laos, Mu Gia Pass	Weapons system operator on F-4D #66-7474 shot down on a daytime bombing mission, no ejection observed	Presumptive finding of death until June 2017 when his remains were identified
February 5	Swigart, Paul E	Lieutenant (LTJG)	US Navy	VF-24, USS Hancock		North Vietnam, Gulf of Tonkin	His F-8H #147919 crashed at sea on a non-combat flight	Killed in action, body not recovered
February 6	Parker, David W	Corporal	US Army	E Company, 20th Infantry Regiment		South Vietnam, Phú Yên Province	Drowned while swimming	Killed in action, body not recovered
February 7	Deleidi, Richard A	Captain	USMC	VMFA-334		South Vietnam, South China Sea	Pilot of F-4J #155762 hit by enemy fire and crashed at sea offshore of Danang Air Base. The radar intercept officer, 1Lt J W Maxwell ejected successfully	Killed in action, body not recovered
February 8	Kalil, Thomas E	Civilian				South Vietnam	Captured near Biên Hòa, he died from illness in June 1969	Died in captivity, remains not returned
February 8	Wilkins, Calvin W	Lance Corporal	USMC	3rd Battalion 3rd Marines		South Vietnam, Quảng Trị Province	Killed by a mine while on patrol, no recoverable remains	Killed in action, body not recovered
February 9	Meyers, Roger A	Lieutenant Commander	US Navy	VA-164, USS Hancock		North Vietnam, Gulf of Tonkin	His A-4E #151103 crashed into the sea on launch	Killed in action, body not recovered
February 11	Kroske, Harold W	1st Lieutenant	US Army	RT Hammer, CCS, MACV-SOG		Cambodia, Kratié Province	Hit by enemy fire while on patrol, he was left behind as his unit was forced to withdraw	Presumptive finding of death
February 14	Clark, Stanley S	Lieutenant Colonel	USAF	497th Tactical Fighter Squadron	Operation Steel Tiger	Laos, Saravane Province	Pilot of F-4D #65‑0651 hit by enemy fire on a night strike mission. The weapons system operator 1Lt Gordon K Breault ejected successfully and was rescued	Presumptive finding of death
February 14	Stevens, Larry J	Lieutenant (LTJG)	US Navy	VA-216, USS Coral Sea	Operation Steel Tiger	Laos	His A-4C #149529 was hit by enemy fire and crashed on a night strike mission	Presumptive finding of death
February 15	Niedecken, William C	Lieutenant (LTJG)	US Navy	VA-105, USS Kitty Hawk	Operation Steel Tiger	Laos	His A-7A #153181 disappeared on a night strike mission	Killed in action, body not recovered
February 15	Walsh, Richard A	Lieutenant Colonel	USAF	602d Special Operations Squadron	Operation Steel Tiger	Laos, Saravane Province	His A-1J #52-14208 was hit by enemy fire and crashed while supporting the rescue of 1LT Gordon K Breault	Presumptive finding of death
February 16	Moore, Jerry L	Private First Class	US Army	2nd Battalion, 12th Cavalry Regiment		South Vietnam, Tây Ninh Province	Disappeared from his observation post following an enemy mortar attack	Presumptive finding of death
February 16	Wogan, William M	Specialist	US Army	1st Battalion, 506th Infantry Regiment		South Vietnam, Thừa Thiên province	Disappeared following a command detonated explosion, no recoverable remains	Presumptive finding of death
February 18	Brucher, John M	Captain	USAF	44th Tactical Fighter Squadron	Operation Rolling Thunder	North Vietnam, Quảng Bình Province	His F-105D was hit by enemy fire, he ejected successfully and informed SAR forces that he was injured and hanging by his parachute from a tree. SAR forces were unable to secure the area until the following day and found his parachute empty	Presumptive finding of death
February 18	Chapman, Rodney M	Lieutenant Commander	US Navy	VAH-10, USS Coral Sea		North Vietnam, Gulf of Tonkin	Pilot of KA-3B #138943 that disappeared while returning from a night refueling mission	Killed in action, body not recovered
February 18	Jerome, Stanley M	Aviation Structural Mechanic 1st Class	US Navy	VAH-10, USS Coral Sea		North Vietnam, Gulf of Tonkin	Crewman on KA-3B #138943 that disappeared while returning from a night refueling mission	Killed in action, body not recovered
February 18	Schimmels, Eddie R	Aviation Ordinanceman 1st Class	US Navy	VAH-10, USS Coral Sea		North Vietnam, Gulf of Tonkin	Crewman on KA-3B #138943 that disappeared while returning from a night refueling mission	Killed in action, body not recovered
February 20	Neislar, David P	Lieutenant (LTJG)	US Navy	VF-21, USS Ranger		North Vietnam, Gulf of Tonkin	Crewman on F-4J #155763 which crashed into the sea on launch	Killed in action, body not recovered
March 1	Keller, Wendell R	Major	USAF	433rd Tactical Fighter Squadron	Operation Steel Tiger	Laos, Khammouane Province	Pilot of F-4D #66-8814 hit by enemy fire on a night bombing mission	Presumptive finding of death. His remains were identified in October 2012
March 1	Lovegren, David E	Corporal	US Army	1st Battalion, 20th Infantry Regiment		South Vietnam, Quảng Ngãi Province	Passenger on UH-1H #65-10020 that crashed killing all 9 persons on board. During the recovery operation his body was dropped from the recovery helicopter	Killed in action, body not recovered
March 2	Bogiages, Christos	Major	USAF	357th Tactical Fighter Squadron	Operation Barrel Roll	Laos, Plain of Jars	His F-105D #61-0109 was hit by enemy fire, no ejection observed	Presumptive finding of death
March 2	Evans, William A	Sergeant	US Army	RT Plumb, CCS, MACV-SOG		Cambodia, Fishhook	Team leader of a reconnaissance unit, he was killed by enemy fire and left behind when the position was overrun	Killed in action, body not recovered
March 2	May, Michael F	Specialist 5	US Army	RT Plumb, CCS, MACV-SOG		Cambodia, Fishhook	Member of a reconnaissance unit, he was killed by enemy fire and left behind when the position was overrun	Killed in action, body not recovered
March 3	Smith, William M	Private First Class	US Army	3rd Battalion, 8th Infantry Regiment		South Vietnam, Kon Tum Province	Disappeared after falling down an embankment while on patrol	Died in captivity, remains not returned
March 6	Coleman, Jimmy L	Private First Class	US Army	4th Battalion, 47th Infantry Regiment		South Vietnam, Kien Hoa Province	Shot and disappeared while crossing a bridge near Mỹ Tho	Presumptive finding of death
March 6	McDonnell, John T	Captain	US Army	4th Battalion, 77th Artillery Regiment		South Vietnam, Thừa Thiên Province	Aircraft commander of AH-1G #67-15845 hit by enemy fire and crashed. The pilot Lt Ronald Greenfield was rescued from the crash site.	Presumptive finding of death
March 9	Rex, Robert F	Captain	USAF	23rd Tactical Air Support Squadron	Operation Steel Tiger	Laos, Savannakhet Province	Pilot of O-2A #67-21425 that crashed on a daytime reconnaissance mission. SAR forces located their bodies in the wreckage but were unable to recover them due to enemy presence. The remains of the observer SSGT Tim L. Walters were identified in 1999	Killed in action, body not recovered
March 10	Luna, Carter P	Lieutenant Colonel	USAF	435th Tactical Fighter Squadron	Operation Steel Tiger	Laos, Savannakhet Province	Pilot of F-4D #65‑0722 hit by enemy fire, both crewmen ejected successfully and contacted SAR forces. The weapons system operator CPT Aldis P. Rutyna was later rescued	Presumptive finding of death
March 12	Robinson, Floyd H	Sergeant	US Army	1st Battalion, 8th Infantry Regiment		South Vietnam, Kon Tum Province	Member of a 5-man reconnaissance team, he was separated from his team following an ambush	Presumptive finding of death
March 17	Armitstead, Steven R	1st Lieutenant	USMC	VMFA(AW)-533	Operation Steel Tiger	Laos, Savannakhet Province	Pilot of A-6A #154160 hit by enemy fire and crashed on a night bombing mission. The remains of the bombardier/navigator CPT Charles E. Finney were identified in 2000	Presumptive finding of death
March 17	Dinan, David T	1st Lieutenant	USAF	34th Tactical Fighter Squadron	Operation Barrel Roll	Laos, Xiangkhouang Province	His F-105 #61-0104 was hit by enemy fire and he ejected successfully. SAR forces located his body but were unable to recover it due to enemy presence	Killed in action, body not recovered until 18 August 2017 when he was accounted for
March 18	Murphy, Barry D	Specialist 5	US Army	CCS, MACV-SOG		Cambodia, Fish Hook	Killed when his team was ambushed on a bomb damage assessment mission, his body could not be recovered due to enemy fire	Killed in action, body not recovered
March 20	Davis, Ricardo G	Sergeant First Class	US Army	RT Copperhead, CCN, MACV-SOG		Laos, Saravane Province	Killed by enemy fire during an ambush, his body was left behind due to enemy presence	Presumptive finding of death
March 24	Bowers, Richard L	Captain	US Army	Advisory Team 71, MACV Advisers		South Vietnam	Disappeared after the ARVN base at Tam Soc was overrun	Presumptive finding of death
March 25	Herrera, Frederick D	Private First Class	US Army	1st Battalion, 8th Infantry Regiment		South Vietnam, Kon Tum Province	Disappeared after becoming separated from his unit while on a road interdiction mission	Presumptive finding of death
March 25	Hicks, Prentice W	Private First Class	US Army	1st Battalion, 8th Infantry Regiment		South Vietnam, Kon Tum Province	Wounded and then disappeared after becoming separated from his unit while on a road interdiction mission	Presumptive finding of death
March 25	Roberts, Richard D	Private First Class	US Army	1st Battalion, 8th Infantry Regiment		South Vietnam, Kon Tum Province	Disappeared after becoming separated from his unit while on a road interdiction mission	Presumptive finding of death
March 27	Czerwiec, Raymond G	Sergeant	US Army	3rd Battalion, 12th Infantry Regiment		South Vietnam, Kon Tum Province	Disappeared when his unit was attacked on a reconnaissance patrol and forced to withdraw	Presumptive finding of death
March 28	Belcher, Robert A	Major	USAF	389th Tactical Fighter Squadron		South Vietnam, Quảng Trị Province	Pilot of F-4D #66-8764 hit by enemy fire on a close air support mission, no ejection observed	Killed in action, body not recovered
March 28	Miller, Michael A	1st Lieutenant	USAF	389th Tactical Fighter Squadron		South Vietnam, Quảng Trị province	Weapons system operator on F-4D #66-8764 hit by enemy fire on a close air support mission, no ejection observed	Killed in action, body not recovered
March 29	Hess, Frederick W	1st Lieutenant	USAF	390th Tactical Fighter Squadron	Operation Steel Tiger	Laos, Savannakhet Province	Weapons system operator on F-4D #66-8809 hit by enemy fire on a defoliation mission. The pilot Captain W. J. Popendorf ejected successfully and was rescued	Presumptive finding of death
March 30	Latimer, Clarence A	Specialist	US Army	3rd Battalion, 12th Infantry Regiment		South Vietnam, Kon Tum Province	Wounded and left behind when his unit was forced to withdraw while trying to receover bodies of soldiers killed several days previously	Presumptive finding of death
April 2	Powers, Lowell S	Warrant Officer 1	US Army	159th Assault Helicopter Battalion		South Vietnam, Quảng Trị Province	Copliot of CH-47 #67-18523 that crashed on liftoff with 73 ARVN on board, the aircraft exploded and caught fire. No recoverable remains	Presumptive finding of death
April 12	De Soto, Ernest L	Major	USAF	390th Tactical Fighter Squadron		South Vietnam, Quảng Nam Province	Pilot of F-4D #66‑8766 that disappeared on a bombing mission	Presumptive finding of deathuntil 23 March 2023 when he was accounted for
April 12	Hall, Frederick M	1st Lieutenant	USAF	390th Tactical Fighter Squadron		South Vietnam	Weapons system operator on F-4D #66‑8766 that disappeared on a bombing mission	Presumptive finding of death until 23 March 2023 when he was accounted for
April 13	Pierson, William C	Warrant Officer	US Army	2nd Squadron, 17th Cavalry Regiment		South Vietnam, Quảng Nam Province	Copilot of AH-1G #67-15677 that disintegrated in midair during a gun run. The remains of the pilot Capt. Alvie J. Ledford were recovered 7 days later	Presumptive finding of death
April 16	Konyu, William M	Warrant Officer	US Army	B Company, 101st Aviation Battalion		South Vietnam, Quảng Nam Province	Pilot of UH-1D #66-16343 hit by enemy fire, crashed and burned. His remains later disappeared from the wreckage	Killed in action, body not recovered
April 17	Willett, Robert V	1st Lieutenant	USAF	390th Tactical Fighter Squadron	Operation Steel Tiger	Laos, Saravane Province	His F-100D was hit by enemy fire on a night bombing mission	Presumptive finding of death
April 18	Ellis, Randall S	Specialist	US Army	1st Battalion, 8th Cavalry Regiment		South Vietnam	Medic wounded and then disappeared while awaiting medical evacuation	Presumptive finding of death
April 22	Scott, Vincent C	1st Lieutenant	USAF	480th Tactical Fighter Squadron	Operation Steel Tiger	Laos	Weapons system operator on F-4D #65‑0649 hit by enemy fire	Killed in action, body not recovered
April 22	Van Cleave, Walter S	Lieutenant Colonel	USAF	480th Tactical Fighter Squadron	Operation Steel Tiger	Laos	Pilot of F-4D #65‑0649 hit by enemy fire	Killed in action, body not recovered
April 24	Shriver, Jerry M	Sergeant First Class	US Army	CCS, MACV-SOG		Cambodia, Fish Hook	Wounded and disappeared during a raid on the suspected location of COSVN	Presumptive finding of death
May 2	Mascari, Phillip L	1st Lieutenant	USAF	23rd Tactical Air Support Squadron	Operation Steel Tiger	Laos, Saravane Province	Pilot of O-2A that disappeared on a forward air control mission	Presumptive finding of death
May 8	Brashear, William J	Major	USAF	559th Tactical Fighter Squadron	Operation Steel Tiger	Laos, Saravane Province	Pilot of F-4C #64‑0805 hit by enemy fire, both crewmen ejected successfully, but one parachute failed to deploy properly. One crewman contacted SAR forces but contact was lost before a rescue could begin	Presumptive finding of death
May 8	Mundt, Henry G	1st Lieutenant	USAF	559th Tactical Fighter Squadron	Operation Steel Tiger	Laos, Saravane Province	Weapons system operator on F-4C #64‑0805 hit by enemy fire, both crewmen ejected successfully, but one parachute failed to deploy properly. One crewman contacted SAR forces but contact was lost before a rescue could begin	Presumptive finding of death
May 10	Walters, William	Private First Class	US Army	92nd Engineer Battalion		South Vietnam, Saigon	Operator of a barge-mounted crane that fell into the Saigon River	Killed in action, body not recovered
May 11	Ryan, William C	1st Lieutenant	USMC	VMFA-115	Operation Steel Tiger	Laos, Savannakhet Province	Radar intercept officer on F-4B #15288 hit by enemy fire. The pilot 1LT Gary Bain ejected successfully and was rescued	Killed in action, body not recovered
May 13	Bessor, Bruce C	1st Lieutenant	US Army	219th Aviation Company, 223rd Aviation Battalion		Laos, Sekong Province	Pilot of O-1G #51-16959 that disappeared while conducting a radio relay mission for a MACV-SOG patrol	Presumptive finding of death
May 13	Scott, Mike J	Sergeant First Class	US Army	CCC, MACV-SOG		Laos, Sekong Province	Observer on O-1G #51-16959 that disappeared while conducting a radio relay mission for a MACV-SOG patrol	Presumptive finding of death
May 13	Brooks, John H	Specialist	US Army	129th Aviation Company, 268th Aviation Battalion		South Vietnam, Bình Định Province	Crew chief on a UH-1H #67-17399 that was shot down while inserting ROKA troops. SAR forces inspected the wreckage the following day, but could not locate his body	Presumptive finding of death
May 13	Masuda, Robert S	Specialist	US Army	1st Battalion, 508th Infantry Regiment		South Vietnam, Bình Dương Province	Leader of a 2-man machine gun team that disappeared while providing cover for a reconnaissance in force mission	Presumptive finding of death
May 13	Munoz, David L	Private First Class	US Army	1st Battalion, 508th Infantry Regiment		South Vietnam, Bình Dương Province	Member of a 2-man machine gun team that disappeared while providing cover for a reconnaissance in force mission	Presumptive finding of death
May 17	Stewart, Virgil G	1st Lieutenant	USAF	433rd Tactical Fighter Squadron	Operation Steel Tiger	Laos, Khammouane Province	Weapons system operator on F-4D hit by enemy fire near the Mu Gia Pass. He ejected successfully and contacted SAR forces, a pararescueman was lowered to his position and found him dead, but was unable to recover his body due to enemy fire	Killed in action, body not recovered
May 18	Cudlike, Charles J	Specialist	US Army	1st Battalion, 506th Infantry Regiment	Operation Apache Snow	South Vietnam, Thừa Thiên Province	Wounded during a firefight, he was being medevaced when the helicopter took off quickly due to enemy fire and he was hanging on to the helicopter skid, he lost his grip and fell from an altitude of 500 feet	Killed in action, body not recovered
May 23	Benton, Gregory R	Private First Class	USMC	1st Battalion, 9th Marines		South Vietnam, Quảng Trị Province	Disappeared when his position was overrun	Presumptive finding of death
May 23	Ramirez, Armando	Specialist 5	US Army	155th Assault Helicopter Company, 10th Aviation Battalion		Cambodia, Kratié Province	Crew chief on UH-1H #68-15392 shot down while inserting a MACV-SOG team. All crewmembers were killed and his body was pinned under the wreckage and could not be recovered.	Killed in action, body not recovered
May 24	Manske, Charles J	Captain	USAF	355th Tactical Fighter Squadron		South Vietnam, South China Sea	His F-100D was hit by enemy fire and crashed at sea offshore of Phú Yên Province	Killed in action, body not recovered
May 24	Montez, Anastacio	Sergeant First Class	US Army	Detachment B-20, 5th Special Forces Group		South Vietnam, Kon Tum Province	Killed when his MIKE Force unit was attacked by enemy forces, his body was unable to be recovered	Killed in action, body not recovered
May 25	Weitz, Monek	Private	USMC	1st Battalion 12th Marines		South Vietnam, Quảng Trị Province	Artillery forward observer killed when enemy mortar fire hit an ammunition dump causing a secondary explosion, no recoverable remains	Killed in action, body not recovered
May 25	Williams, Leroy C	Private First Class	USMC	1st Battalion 3rd Marines		South Vietnam, Quảng Trị Province	Killed when enemy mortar fire hit an ammunition dump causing a secondary explosion, no recoverable remains	Killed in action, body not recovered
June 13	Story, James C	Private	US Army	512th Transportation Company, 54th Transport Battalion		South Vietnam, Pleiku	Driver of an ammunition truck hit by enemy fire causing a secondary explosion, no recoverable remains	Killed in action, body not recovered
June 13	Ward, Neal C	1st Lieutenant	USAF	602nd Special Operations Squadron	Operation Barrel Roll	Laos	His A-1 was shot down	Presumptive finding of death until July 2019 when he was accounted for
June 14	Grace, James W	Captain	USAF	497th Tactical Fighter Squadron	Operation Steel Tiger	Laos, Savannakhet Province	Pilot of F-4D #66‑7574 hit by enemy fire, both crewmen ejected successfully. While being rescued, the helicopter hit a tree and he fell from the jungle penetrator from a height of 300 feet. The weapons system operator 1LT Wayne Karas was rescued.	Presumptive finding of death
June 14	Kahler, Harold	Major	USAF	354th Tactical Fighter Squadron	Operation Steel Tiger	Laos	His F-105 #60-5381 crashed into a cliff on a bombing run	Presumptive finding of death
June 17	Sparks, Donald L	Private First Class	US Army	3rd Battalion, 21st Infantry Regiment		South Vietnam, Quảng Tín Province	Point man on a patrol that was ambushed, he was seen to be hit by enemy fire, but his body could not be recovered. When friendly forces secured the area the next day they were unable to locate his body	Presumptive finding of death
June 22	Roberson, John W	Private First Class	US Army	4th Battalion, 12th Infantry Regiment		South Vietnam, Bình Tuy Province	Drowned while on patrol	Killed in action, body not recovered
June 23	Sage, Leland C	1st Lieutenant	US Navy	VA-144, USS Bon Homme Richard	Operation Steel Tiger	Laos, Khammouane Province	His A-4E #152029 hit the ground on a night bombing mission	Killed in action, body not recovered
June 27	Jablonski, Michael J	Private First Class	US Army	3rd Battalion, 47th Infantry Regiment		South Vietnam, Kien Hoa Province	Drowned while on patrol	Killed in action, body not recovered
July 2	Fransen, Albert M	Engineman Third Class	US Navy	PCF-87, TF-115	Operation Market Time	South Vietnam, South China Sea	Killed by a mortar round exploding prematurely on a night fire mission offshore of Khánh Hòa Province, his body was blown into the water and lost during recovery	Killed in action, body not recovered
July 4	Fallon, Patrick M	Colonel	USAF	HQ Squadron, 56th Special Operations Wing	Operation Barrel Roll	Laos, Xiangkhouang Province	His A-1 was hit by enemy fire and he ejected successfully. His last radio contact advised that he was wounded and surrounded by enemy forces	Presumptive finding of death
July 8	Andre, Howard V	Major	USAF	609th Special Operations Squadron	Operation Barrel Roll	Laos, Xiangkhouang Province	Navigator on A-26A #64-17646 hit by enemy fire and crashed on a night armed reconnaissance mission	Listed as killed in action, body not recovered, until April 2013 when his remains were identified
July 8	Sizemore, James E	Major	USAF	609th Special Operations Squadron	Operation Barrel Roll	Laos, Xiangkhouang Province	Pilot of A-26A #64-17646 hit by enemy fire and crashed on a night armed reconnaissance mission	Listed as killed in action, body not recovered until April 2013 when his remains were identified
July 12	Bannon, Paul W	Major	USAF	433rd Tactical Fighter Squadron	Operation Steel Tiger	Laos	Pilot of F-4D #66-7697 that disappeared in bad weather on a Fast-FAC mission	Presumptive finding of death
July 12	Pike, Peter X	1st Lieutenant	USAF	433rd Tactical Fighter Squadron	Operation Steel Tiger	Laos	Weapons system operator on F-4D #66-7697 that disappeared in bad weather on a Fast-FAC mission	Presumptive finding of death
July 14	Butler, Dewey R	Private First Class	US Army	C Troop, 1st Squadron, 9th Cavalry Regiment		South Vietnam	Door gunner on UH-1B #62-02063 that collided in mid-air with an OH-6 and crashed in flames killing the entire crew. SAR forces secure the wreckage the following day but his remains were believed to have been taken by animals	Killed in action, body not recovered
July 15	Walker, Michael S	Captain	USAF	389th Tactical Fighter Squadron	Operation Steel Tiger	Laos, Salavan Province	Pilot of F-4D #66‑7603 that crashed on a night bombing mission. The remains of the weapons system operator 1LT Harmon Polster were returned in 2007	Presumptive finding of death
July 16	Dawson, James V	Captain	USAF	416th Tactical Fighter Squadron		South Vietnam, South China Sea	His F-100 crashed at sea offshore of Tuy Hoa Air Base	Killed in action, body not recovered
July 20	Smiley, Stanley K	Lieutenant	US Navy	VA-23, USS Oriskany	Operation Steel Tiger	Laos, Salavan Province	His A-4E #154993 hit the ground on an attack run	Killed in action, body not recovered
July 26	Brenning, Richard D	Lieutenant	US Navy	VA-112, USS Ticonderoga		North Vietnam, Gulf of Tonkin	His A-4C #147833 crashed on launch and he was unable to be rescued	Killed in action, body not recovered
July 31	Burns, Michael P	Specialist	US Army	CCN, MACV-SOG		Laos, Salavan Province	Severely wounded and left behind when his reconnaissance team was ambushed while awaiting helicopter extraction	Presumptive finding of death
July 31	Neal, Dennis P	Captain	US Army	CCN, MACV-SOG		Laos, Salavan Province	Severely wounded and left behind when his reconnaissance team was ambushed while awaiting helicopter extraction	Presumptive finding of death
August 1	Burd, Douglas G	1st Lieutenant	USAF	421st Tactical Fighter Squadron		South Vietnam, Quảng Ngãi Province	Weapons system operator on F-4E #67‑0323 hit by enemy fire	Killed in action, body not recovered
August 1	Callies, Tommy L	Captain	USAF	421st Tactical Fighter Squadron		South Vietnam, Quảng Ngãi Province	Pilot of F-4E #67‑0323 hit by enemy fire	Killed in action, body not recovered
August 2	Talken, George F	Lieutenant Commander	US Navy	VA-37, USS Kitty Hawk		North Vietnam, Gulf of Tonkin	His A-7A #153185 crashed at sea on approach to the carrier	Killed in action, body not recovered
August 9	Beck, Edward E	Private First Class	USMC	1st Battalion, 13th Marines		South Vietnam, Da Nang Harbour	Disappeared from the USS Belle Grove (LSD-2)	Presumptive finding of death
August 9	Janousek, Ronald J	1st Lieutenant	USMC	HML-367		Laos, Salavan Province	Copilot of UH-1E #155339 hit by enemy fire and crashed in flames into a river during an emergency extraction mission. The pilot MAJ Thomas B Hill and the crew chief LCPL John O Dean were rescued	Killed in action, body not recovered
August 9	Kane, Bruce E	Corporal	USMC	HML-367		Laos, Salavan Province	Door gunner on UH-1E #155339 hit by enemy fire and crashed in flames into a river	Killed in action, body not recovered
August 10	Mickelsen, William E	Lieutenant	US Navy	VA-144, USS Bon Homme Richard		North Vietnam, Gulf of Tonkin	His A-4E #151131 crashed into the carrier during a night landing and the wreckage fell into the sea	Killed in action, body not recovered
August 13	Hansen, Lester A	Chief Warrant Officer	US Army	170th Assault Helicopter Company		South Vietnam, Kon Tum Province	Pilot of UH-1C hit by enemy fire and crash-landed, the crew was evacuated by another helicopter and he was only able to hang onto a skid and he later fell from a height of at least 100 feet	Presumptive finding of death
August 19	Bohlig, James R	1st Lieutenant	USMC	VMFA-115		South Vietnam, South China Sea	Pilot of F-4B #151012 that disappeared while returning from a night strike mission over Quảng Tín Province	Killed in action, body not recovered
August 19	Morrissey, Richard T	Captain	USMC	VMFA-115		South Vietnam, South China Sea	Radar intercept operator on F-4B #151012 that disappeared while returning from a night strike mission over Quảng Tín Province	Killed in action, body not recovered
August 19	Smith, Robert N	Lieutenant Colonel	USMC	VMFA-542		North Vietnam, Quảng Bình Province	Pilot of F-4B #149416 that disappeared while escorting a photo reconnaissance mission. The remains of the radar intercept officer Capt. John N. Flanigan were returned in 1989	Presumptive finding of death
August 29	Graf, Albert S	Lieutenant	USMC	VMFA-542		South Vietnam, Que Son District	Radar intercept officer on F-4B #153041 hit by enemy fire	Killed in action, body not recovered
August 29	Zimmer, Jerry A	Captain	USMC	VMFA-542		South Vietnam, Que Son District	Pilot of F-4B #153041 hit by enemy fire	Killed in action, body not recovered
September 1	Escobedo, Julian	Lance Corporal	USMC	HMH-361		South Vietnam, Quảng Trị Province	Crewman on CH-53A #153282 that crashed, the bodies of the other 4 crewmen were recovered on 3 September	Killed in action, body not recovered
September 11	Helwig, Roger D	Captain	USAF	390th Tactical Fighter Squadron	Operation Steel Tiger	Laos, Savannakhet Province	Pilot of F-4D #66‑7530shot down on a bombing mission. The remains of the weapons system operator Capt Roger H. Stearns were returned in 1990	Killed in action, body not recovered
September 16	Trampski, Donald J	Private First Class	US Army	1st Battalion, 14th Infantry Regiment		South Vietnam, Pleiku Province	Drowned while on patrol	Presumptive finding of death
September 18	Cline, Curtis R	Private First Class	US Army	1st Battalion, 12th Infantry Regiment		South Vietnam, Pleiku Province	Drowned while on patrol	Presumptive finding of death
September 21	Cecil, Alan B	Specialist 5	US Army	RT Moccasin, CCN, MACV-SOG		Laos, Savannakhet Province	His reconnaissance team was ambushed shortly after insertion and he was shot and killed, his body was left behind as the remaining team members evacuated	Killed in action, body not recovered
September 21	Jackson, James W	Private First Class	USMC	L Company, 3rd Battalion 4th Marines		South Vietnam, Quảng Trị Province	Wounded during an ammunition explosion at Firebase Russell, he was medevaced to the 3rd Medical Battalion hospital at Quảng Trị but disappeared before arriving at hospital	Presumptive finding of death
September 27	Huntley, John N	Private First Class	US Army	57th Assault Helicopter Company		Laos, Attapeu Province	Door gunner on UH-1H #68-15558 hit by enemy fire while extracting an MACV-SOG team, the helicopter crash-landed and his body was pinned under the wreckage which then caught fire	Killed in action, body not recovered
October 2	Beck, Terry L	Aviation Structural Mechanic 3rd Class	US Navy	VF-143, USS Constellation		North Vietnam, Gulf of Tonkin	Passenger on C-2A #152796 that crashed on approach to the USS Constellation on a flight from Naval Air Station Cubi Point	Killed in action, body not recovered
October 2	Bell, Richard W	Aviation Electronics Technician 3rd Class	US Navy	VF-142, USS Constellation		North Vietnam, Gulf of Tonkin	Passenger on C-2A #152796 that crashed on approach to the USS Constellation	Killed in action, body not recovered
October 2	Bowman, Michael L	Aviation Support Equipment Technician 3rd Class	US Navy	VA-27, USS Constellation		North Vietnam, Gulf of Tonkin	Passenger on C-2A #152796 that crashed on approach to the USS Constellation	Killed in action, body not recovered
October 2	Bytheway, Frank L	Civilian		Collins Radio		North Vietnam, Gulf of Tonkin	Passenger on C-2A #152796 that crashed on approach to the USS Constellation	Killed in action, body not recovered
October 2	Dayao, Rolando C	Personnelman 1st Class	US Navy	USS Walke		North Vietnam, Gulf of Tonkin	Passenger on C-2A #152796 that crashed on approach to the USS Constellation	Killed in action, body not recovered
October 2	Dean, Donald C	Hospital Corpsman 2nd Class	US Navy	VAW-113, USS Constellation		North Vietnam, Gulf of Tonkin	Passenger on C-2A #152796 that crashed on approach to the USS Constellation	Killed in action, body not recovered
October 2	Dilger, Herbert H	Lieutenant	US Navy	VRC-50		North Vietnam, Gulf of Tonkin	Pilot of C-2A #152796 that crashed on approach to the USS Constellation	Killed in action, body not recovered
October 2	Ellerd, Carl J	Aviation Structural Mechanic 2nd Class	US Navy	VA-97, USS Constellation		North Vietnam, Gulf of Tonkin	Passenger on C-2A #152796 that crashed on approach to the USS Constellation	Killed in action, body not recovered
October 2	Fowler, James J	Aviation Electrician 2nd Class	US Navy	VF-143, USS Constellation		North Vietnam, Gulf of Tonkin	Passenger on C-2A #152796 that crashed on approach to the USS Constellation	Killed in action, body not recovered
October 2	Fowler, Roy G	Hospital Corpsman 3rd Class	US Navy	USS Constellation		North Vietnam, Gulf of Tonkin	Passenger on C-2A #152796 that crashed on approach to the USS Constellation	Killed in action, body not recovered
October 2	Gan, Leonardo M	Chief Yeoman	US Navy	USS Walke		North Vietnam, Gulf of Tonkin	Passenger on C-2A #152796 that crashed on approach to the USS Constellation	Killed in action, body not recovered
October 2	Gore, Paul E	Machinist 1st Class	US Navy	USS Constellation		North Vietnam, Gulf of Tonkin	Passenger on C-2A #152796 that crashed on approach to the USS Constellation	Killed in action, body not recovered
October 2	Gorsuch, William D	Aviation Boatswain 3rd Class	US Navy	USS Constellation		North Vietnam, Gulf of Tonkin	Passenger on C-2A #152796 that crashed on approach to the USS Constellation	Killed in action, body not recovered
October 2	Hill, Rayford J	Aviation Structural Mechanic 3rd Class	US Navy	VRC-50		North Vietnam, Gulf of Tonkin	Crewman on C-2A #152796 that crashed on approach to the USS Constellation	Killed in action, body not recovered
October 2	Kohler, Delvin L	Aviation Structural Mechanic 3rd Class	US Navy	VF-142, USS Constellation		North Vietnam, Gulf of Tonkin	Passenger on C-2A #152796 that crashed on approach to the USS Constellation	Killed in action, body not recovered
October 2	Koslosky, Howard M	Airman	US Navy	VF-142, USS Constellation		North Vietnam, Gulf of Tonkin	Passenger on C-2A #152796 that crashed on approach to the USS Constellation	Killed in action, body not recovered
October 2	Leonard, Robert B	Fire Control Technician 2nd Class	US Navy	USS Constellation		North Vietnam, Gulf of Tonkin	Passenger on C-2A #152796 that crashed on approach to the USS Constellation	Killed in action, body not recovered
October 2	Livingston, Richard A	Lieutenant	US Navy	VRC-50		North Vietnam, Gulf of Tonkin	Copilot of C-2A #152796 that crashed on approach to the USS Constellation	Killed in action, body not recovered
October 2	Montgomery, Ronald W	Aviation Fire Control Technician 2nd Class	US Navy	VF-143, USS Constellation		North Vietnam, Gulf of Tonkin	Passenger on C-2A #152796 that crashed on approach to the USS Constellation	Killed in action, body not recovered
October 2	Moore, William R	Machinist 2nd Class	US Navy	USS Long Beach		North Vietnam, Gulf of Tonkin	Passenger on C-2A #152796 that crashed on approach to the USS Constellation	Killed in action, body not recovered
October 2	Moser, Paul K	Aviation Machinist 3rd Class	US Navy	VRC-50		North Vietnam, Gulf of Tonkin	Crewman on C-2A #152796 that crashed on approach to the USS Constellation	Killed in action, body not recovered
October 2	Prentice, Kenneth M	Aviation Machinist 2nd Class	US Navy	VF-142, USS Constellation		North Vietnam, Gulf of Tonkin	Passenger on C-2A #152796 that crashed on approach to the USS Constellation	Killed in action, body not recovered
October 2	Salazar, Fidel G	Steward 2nd Class	US Navy	VAQ-133, USS Constellation		North Vietnam, Gulf of Tonkin	Passenger on C-2A #152796 that crashed on approach to the USS Constellation	Killed in action, body not recovered
October 2	Terrell, Keavin L	Data Systems Technician 3rd Class	US Navy	USS Constellation		North Vietnam, Gulf of Tonkin	Passenger on C-2A #152796 that crashed on approach to the USS Constellation	Killed in action, body not recovered
October 2	Tye, Michael J	Aviation Machinist 3rd Class	US Navy	VRC-50		North Vietnam, Gulf of Tonkin	Crewman on C-2A #152796 that crashed on approach to the USS Constellation	Killed in action, body not recovered
October 2	Viado, Reynaldo R	Stewardsman	US Navy	USS Hamner		North Vietnam, Gulf of Tonkin	Passenger on C-2A #152796 that crashed on approach to the USS Constellation	Killed in action, body not recovered
October 3	Cunningham, Kenneth L	Private	US Army	225th Aviation Company		South Vietnam, Kon Tum Province	Observer on OV-1C #61-02679 that crashed into a mountain on an afternoon reconnaissance mission. SAR forces were unable to investigate the wreckage	Presumptive finding of death
October 3	Graffe, Paul L	1st Lieutenant	US Army	225th Aviation Company		South Vietnam, Kon Tum Province	Pilot of OV-1C #61-02679 that crashed into a mountain on an afternoon reconnaissance mission	Presumptive finding of death
October 8	Altizer, Albert H	Private First Class	US Army	2nd Battalion, 8th Cavalry Regiment		South Vietnam, Phuoc Binh Province	Drowned when a boat he was riding in on patrol capsized	Killed in action, body not recovered
October 8	Watkins, Robert J	Chief Warrant Officer	US Army	D Company, 158th Assault Helicopter Battalion		Laos, Salavan Province	Copilot of AH-1G that crash-landed while making an emergency night landing, the pilot Capt. Robert T. Andrews confirmed that Watkins was dead and was rescued 5 days later	Killed in action, body not recovered
October 9	Driver, Dallas A	Sergeant	US Army	5th Battalion, 12th Infantry Regiment		South Vietnam, Thừa Thiên Province	Passenger on UH-1H #63-08826 that hit terrain and crashed into the Đồng Nai River, where it is believed he drowned	Killed in action, body not recovered
October 9	Garbett, Jimmy R	Sergeant	US Army	5th Battalion, 12th Infantry Regiment		South Vietnam, Thừa Thiên Province	Passenger on UH-1H #63-08826 that hit terrain and crashed into the Đồng Nai River, where it is believed he drowned	Killed in action, body not recovered
October 9	Moore, Raymond G	Sergeant	US Army	5th Battalion, 12th Infantry Regiment		South Vietnam, Thừa Thiên Province	Passenger on UH-1H #63-08826 that hit terrain and crashed into the Đồng Nai River, where it is believed he drowned	Killed in action, body not recovered
October 9	Suydam, James L	Sergeant	US Army	5th Battalion, 12th Infantry Regiment		South Vietnam, Thừa Thiên Province	Passenger on UH-1H #63-08826 that hit terrain and crashed into the Đồng Nai River, where it is believed he drowned	Killed in action, body not recovered
October 9	Turner, James H	Specialist 5	US Army	118th Assault Helicopter Company		South Vietnam, Thừa Thiên Province	Door gunner on UH-1H #63-08826 that hit terrain and crashed into the Đồng Nai River, where it is believed he drowned	Killed in action, body not recovered
October 10	Maxwell, Calvin W	Captain	US Army	HHB, 6th Battalion, 14th Field Artillery		South Vietnam, Kon Tum Province	Observer on O-1G #51-11942 that crashed into a river on a daytime reconnaissance mission. SAR forces later located the wreckage but were unable to locate any bodies	Presumptive finding of death
October 10	Weisner, Franklin L	Captain	US Army	219th Aviation Company		South Vietnam, Kon Tum Province	Pilot of O-1G #51-11942 that crashed into a river on a daytime reconnaissance mission. SAR forces later located the wreckage but were unable to locate any bodies	Presumptive finding of death
October 16	Booth, Lawrence R	Captain	US Army	131st Aviation Company		Laos, Bolikhamsai Province	Pilot of OV-1C lost on a night reconnaissance mission	Presumptive finding of death
October 16	Rattin, Dennis M	Specialist	US Army	131st Aviation Company		Laos, Bolikhamsai Province	Observer on OV-1C lost on a night reconnaissance mission	Presumptive finding of death
October 20	Stubbs, William W	Staff Sergeant	US Army	RT California CCC, MACV-SOG		Laos, Attapeu Province	Killed in an ambush, his body was left behind when the team withdrew under enemy fire	Presumptive finding of death
October 21	Cook, Glenn R	1st Lieutenant	USAF	21st Tactical Air Support Squadron		South Vietnam, Tuyen Đức Province	Pilot of O-2A shot down on a FAC mission. The remains of the observer Major John Espenshied were returned in 1989	Presumptive finding of death
October 26	Bynum, Neil S	1st Lieutenant	USAF	497th Tactical Fighter Squadron	Operation Steel Tiger	Laos, Ban Karai Pass	Weapons system operator on F-4D #65-0751 that crashed into the ground on a rocket run	Presumptive finding of death
October 26	Warren, Gray D	Captain	USAF	435th Tactical Fighter Squadron	Operation Steel Tiger	Laos, Ban Karai Pass	Pilot of F-4D #65-0751 that crashed into the ground on a rocket run	Presumptive finding of death
October 27	Herrick, James W	1st Lieutenant	USAF	602nd Special Operations Squadron	Operation Barrel Roll	Laos, Xiangkhouang Province	His A-1H crashed on an armed reconnaissance mission	Presumptive finding of death
October 31	Gauthier, Dennis L	Private First Class	US Army	3rd Battalion, 12th Infantry Regiment		South Vietnam, Pleiku Province	Killed during a patrol, his body was left behind as his unit engaged enemy forces and later disappeared	Presumptive finding of death
November 1	Partington, Roger D	Captain	USMC	HMH-361		South Vietnam, South China Sea	Pilot of CH-53A #152394 that exploded inflight and crashed at sea offshore of Marble Mountain Air Facility	Killed in action, body not recovered
November 2	Carroll, Patrick H	1st Lieutenant	USAF	416th Tactical Fighter Squadron	Operation Steel Tiger	Laos, Attapeu Province	Copliot/Observer on F-100F #56-3796 that disappeared on a Misty FAC mission	Presumptive finding of death
November 2	Whitford, Lawrence W	Lieutenant Colonel	USAF	416th Tactical Fighter Squadron	Operation Steel Tiger	Laos, Attapeu Province	Pilot of F-100F #56-3796 that disappeared on a Misty FAC mission	Presumptive finding of death
November 2	Norton, Michael R	Private First Class	US Army	5th Battalion, 27th Artillery Regiment		South Vietnam, Quang Đức Province	Disappeared when his unit came under fire while withdrawing from Landing Zone Kate	Presumptive finding of death
November 4	Alford, Terry L	Warrant Officer	US Army	281st Assault Helicopter Company		South Vietnam	Pilot of UH-1H #67-19512 that disappeared in bad weather on an evening flight to Nha Trang	Presumptive finding of death
November 4	Cavender, Jim R	Warrant Officer	US Army	281st Assault Helicopter Company		South Vietnam	Copilot of UH-1H #67-19512 that disappeared in bad weather on an evening flight to Nha Trang	Presumptive finding of death
November 4	Klimo, James R	Specialist	US Army	281st Assault Helicopter Company		South Vietnam	Gunner on UH-1H #67-19512 that disappeared in bad weather on an evening flight to Nha Trang	Presumptive finding of death
November 4	Ware, John A	Specialist	US Army	281st Assault Helicopter Company		South Vietnam	Crew Chief on UH-1H #67-19512 that disappeared in bad weather on an evening flight to Nha Trang	Presumptive finding of death
November 4	Hanley, Larry J	Captain	USAF	357th Tactical Fighter Squadron	Operation Steel Tiger	Laos	His F-105D #59-1734 was hit by enemy fire	Listed as presumptive finding of death until March 2013 when his remains were identified
November 5	Echanis, Joseph Y	Captain	USAF	497th Tactical Fighter Squadron	Operation Steel Tiger	Laos, Khammouane Province	Weapons system operator on F-4D #66‑7748 lost on a night FAC mission	Presumptive finding of death
November 5	Lefever, Douglas P	Captain	USAF	497th Tactical Fighter Squadron	Operation Steel Tiger	Laos, Khammouane Province	Pilot of F-4D #66‑7748 lost on a night FAC mission	Presumptive finding of death
November 12	Bodahl, Jon K	Captain	USAF	34th Tactical Fighter Squadron	Operation Steel Tiger	Laos, Khammouane Province	Pilot of F-4E #67-0219 hit by enemy fire while supporting a night rescue mission, no ejection observed	Presumptive finding of death
November 12	Smith, Harry W	Captain	USAF	34th Tactical Fighter Squadron	Operation Steel Tiger	Laos, Khammouane Province	Weapons system operator on F-4E #67-0219 hit by enemy fire while supporting a night rescue mission, no ejection observed	Presumptive finding of death
November 12	Helmich, Gerald R	Major	USAF	6th Special Operations Squadron	Operation Steel Tiger	Laos	Pilot of A-1H #52-139821 shot down while supporting rescue efforts for F-4E #67-0219, no ejection observed	Presumptive finding of death
November 13	Ray, Ronald E	Staff Sergeant	US Army	RT Rattler, CCN, MACV-SOG		Laos, Savannakhet Province	Killed when his reconnaissance team was ambushed and overrun	Presumptive finding of death
November 13	Suber, Randolph B	Sergeant	US Army	RT Rattler, CCN, MACV-SOG		Laos, Savannakhet Province	Killed when his reconnaissance team was ambushed and overrun	Presumptive finding of death
November 15	Graf, John G	Lieutenant Commander	US Navy	Naval Advisory Group		South Vietnam, Bà Rịa	Observer on OV-1C Mohawk aircraft #61-2690 hit by enemy fire on a visual reconnaissance mission, both crewmen ejected successfully and were captured. The pilot Capt Robert White later reported that Graf had apparently drowned while attempting to escape in January 1970	Presumptive finding of death
November 20	Baldridge, John R	1st Lieutenant	USAF	20th Tactical Air Support Squadron	Operation Steel Tiger	Laos, Sekong Province	Pilot of O-2A hit by enemy fire on a visual reconnaissance mission. SAR forces located the wreckage quickly but no bodies were seen	Presumptive finding of death
November 20	Renelt, Walter A	Lieutenant Colonel	USAF	20th Tactical Air Support Squadron	Operation Steel Tiger	Laos, Sekong Province	Instructor pilot of O-2A hit by enemy fire on a visual reconnaissance mission. SAR forces located the wreckage quickly but no bodies were seen	Presumptive finding of death until 23 June 2025 when he was accounted for
November 22	Collins, Richard F	Lieutenant Commander	US Navy	VA-196, USS Ranger	Operation Steel Tiger	Laos, Savannakhet Province	Pilot of A-6A #155607 lost on a night armed reconnaissance mission	Presumptive finding of death
November 22	Quinn, Michael E	Lieutenant	US Navy	VA-196, USS Ranger	Operation Steel Tiger	Laos, Savannakhet Province	Bombardier/navigator on A-6A #155607 lost on a night armed reconnaissance mission	Presumptive finding of death
November 22	Deuter, Richard C	Lieutenant (LTJG)	US Navy	VA-196, USS Ranger	Operation Steel Tiger	Laos, Savannakhet Province	Bombardier/navigator on A-6A #155613 that suffered structural failure on a bombing run. The pilot CDR L W Richards ejected successfully and was rescued	Presumptive finding of death
November 23	Jones, Grayland	Private First Class	US Army	128th Signal Company		South Vietnam, Cam Ranh Bay	Drowned while swimming	Killed in action, body not recovered
November 24	White, James B	Captain	USAF	357th Tactical Fighter Squadron	Operation Barrel Roll	Laos, Xiangkhouang Province	His F-105D crashed in low cloud during a bombing mission	Presumptive finding of death until July 2017 when his remains were identified
December 1	Rogers, Billy L	Seaman	US Navy	USS Ranger		North Vietnam, Gulf of Tonkin		Killed in action, body not recovered
December 16	Buckley, Victor P	Lieutenant	US Navy	VFP-63, USS Hancock		North Vietnam, Gulf of Tonkin	His RF-8A was hit by enemy fire on a reconnaissance mission and crashed at sea	Killed in action, body not recovered
December 22	Burris, Donald D	Warrant Officer	US Army	57th Assault Helicopter Company		South Vietnam, Kon Tum Province	Pilot of UH-1C #66-00587 that crashed due to mechanical problems. SAR forces arrived and they were being evacuated by helicopter using a McGuire rig when he fell from a height of approximately 2500 feet	Killed in action, body not recovered
December 22	Kennedy, James E	Specialist	US Army	57th Assault Helicopter Company		Cambodia, Ratanakiri Province	Door gunner on UH-1C #66-00587 that crashed due to mechanical problems, he disappeared from the crash site and SAR forces were unable to locate him	Presumptive finding of death
December 26	Trowbridge, Dustin C	Lieutenant (LTJG)	US Navy	VA-35, USS Coral Sea		North Vietnam, Gulf of Tonkin	Bombardier/navigator on A-6A #152891 that crashed on final approach due to mechanical failure, both crewman ejected but their parachutes did not have time to deploy. The body of the pilot LTJG Walter H Kosky was recovered	Killed in action, body not recovered
December 30	Featherston, Fielding W	Captain	USAF	555th Tactical Fighter Squadron	Operation Barrel Roll	Laos, Xiangkhouang Province	Pilot of F-4D #66‑7590 that hit the ground on a bombing run, no ejection observed	Presumptive finding of death
December 30	Ferguson, Douglas D	1st Lieutenant	USAF	555th Tactical Fighter Squadron	Operation Barrel Roll	Laos, Xiangkhouang Province	Weapons system operator on F-4D #66‑7590 that hit the ground on a bombing run, no ejection observed	Listed as presumptive finding of death until April 2014 when his remains were identified

== See also ==
- List of United States servicemembers and civilians missing in action during the Vietnam War (1961–65)
- List of United States servicemembers and civilians missing in action during the Vietnam War (1966–67)
- List of United States servicemembers and civilians missing in action during the Vietnam War (1970–71)
- List of United States servicemembers and civilians missing in action during the Vietnam War (1972–75)
- Vietnam War POW/MIA issue
- Joint POW/MIA Accounting Command
- Defense Prisoner of War/Missing Personnel Office
- Defense POW/MIA Accounting Agency
