= Gia Nghĩa Camp =

Site information
- Type: Army Base

Location
- Coordinates: 12.012°N 107.7277°E

Site history
- Built: 1966
- In use: 1966-75
- Battles/wars: Vietnam War

Garrison information
- Occupants: 5th Special Forces Group; South Vietnamese Regional Force

Gia Nghĩa Airfield
- IATA: none; ICAO: none

Summary
- Elevation AMSL: 2,136 ft (651 m)

Runways
Direction	Length		Surface
Direction	ft	m	Surface
	2,100	640	laterite

Gia Nghĩa Camp (also known as Gia Nghĩa Special Forces Camp) is a former U.S. Army and Army of the Republic of Vietnam (ARVN) base east of Gia Nghĩa, Dak Nong Province, in the Central Highlands of Vietnam.

== History ==
The 5th Special Forces Group first established a base here in 1966. The base was located 5 km east of Gia Nghĩa. Advisory Team 32, Military Assistance Command, Vietnam was based at Gia Nghĩa.

On 12 February 1968, Bell UH-1H Iroquois #66-17027 crashed on a night medevac mission to Gia Nghĩa, the four crewmen were missing presumed killed.

On 17 December 1969 a USAF Fairchild C-123K Provider #55-4562 crashed on landing at Gia Nghĩa resulting in one fatality.

On 22 March 1975 Gia Nghĩa came under artillery and then ground attack from the PAVN 271B Regiment, after two days of fighting the PAVN captured the town.

== Current use ==
The base has been turned over to farmland.
