= Defense Prisoner of War/Missing Personnel Office =

The Defense Prisoner of War/Missing Personnel Office (DPMO), as part of the United States Department of Defense, was an organization that reported to the under secretary of defense for policy through the assistant secretary of defense (international security affairs). DPMO provided centralized management of prisoner of war/missing personnel (POW/MP) affairs within the Department of Defense.

On January 30, 2015, DPMO, along with the Joint POW/MIA Accounting Command, were merged into the new Defense POW/MIA Accounting Agency. DPMO thus ceased to be as a separate entity.

During its existence, activities of the Director of the DPMO included the following:

- Organize, direct, and manage the DPMO and all assigned resources.
- Serve as the DoD focal point for POW/MP matters.
- Provide DoD participation in the conduct of negotiations with officials of foreign governments in efforts to achieve the fullest possible accounting of Americans missing as a result of military operations.
- Develop uniform DoD procedures for determination of the status of missing personnel and for the systematic, comprehensive, and timely collection, analysis, review, dissemination, and periodic update of information relating to missing personnel.
- Collect and analyze information concerning U.S. military and civilian personnel that are missing, imprisoned, or unaccounted for.
- Maintain case files, comprehensive records, and databases on U.S. military and civilian personnel who are or were prisoners of war, missing, or unaccounted-for as a result of hostile action in compliance with regulatory guidance mandated in the 1996 Missing Persons Act.
- Sanitize or declassify DoD POW/MP documents and related materials for disclosure and release in accordance with 50 U.S. Code, Section 435 Note and Executive Order 12958.
- Maintain open channels of communication with the U.S. Congress, POW/MP families, and veterans' organizations through consultations and other appropriate methods.
- Represent the Department of Defense in established POW/MP related interagency groups.
- Provide intelligence collection requirements to the Defense Intelligence Agency.
- Serve as "executive secretariat" for support to the US-Russia Commission on POW/MP Affairs exercising managerial, administrative, and logistical assistance, as required.
- Managing the recovery of US human remains from the Korean War with the North Korean government during the 1990s

== See also ==
- Vietnam War POW/MIA issue
- List of United States servicemembers and civilians missing in action during the Vietnam War (1961–1965)
- List of United States servicemembers and civilians missing in action during the Vietnam War (1966–67)
- List of United States servicemembers and civilians missing in action during the Vietnam War (1968–69)
- List of United States servicemembers and civilians missing in action during the Vietnam War (1970–71)
- List of United States servicemembers and civilians missing in action during the Vietnam War (1972–1975)
- Operation Glory – about the 1954 post-Korean War Armistice operation to repatriate remains held by North Korea
