= List of United States servicemembers and civilians missing in action during the Vietnam War (1961–1965) =

This article is a list of US MIAs of the Vietnam War in the period 1961–1965. In 1973, the United States listed 2,646 Americans as unaccounted for from the entire Vietnam War. By October 2022, 1,582 Americans remained unaccounted for, of which 1,004 were classified as further pursuit, 488 as non-recoverable and 90 as deferred.

== 1961 ==
Date missing	Surname, First name(s)	Rank	Service	Unit	Operation/Battle Name	Location	Circumstances of loss	Recovery status
January 13	Duffy, Charles J	Civilian				Laos, Vientiane	Civilian with the US mission in Vientiane captured by Pathet Lao while hunting north of Vientiane. He is believed to have died in captivity in 1962	Presumptive finding of death
March 23	Bankowski, Alfons A	Staff sergeant	USAF	314th Air Division		Laos, Xiangkhouang Province	Flight Engineer on Douglas SC-47 Skytrain (Tail number 44-76330) shot down by Pathet Lao while on an intelligence gathering flight, only one passenger was captured by the Pathet Lao and returned following the International Agreement on the Neutrality of Laos. The remains of four of the seven missing passengers were recovered in 1991.	Killed in action, body not recovered
March 23	Weitkamp, Edgar W	Warrant officer	US Army	Army Attaché Office, American Embassy, Laos		Laos, Xiangkhouang Province	Passenger on Douglas SC-47 Skytrain (Tail number 44-76330) shot down by Pathet Lao while on an intelligence gathering flight	Killed in action, body not recovered
March 23	Weston, Oscar B	First lieutenant	USAF	314th Air Division		Laos, Xiangkhouang Province	Co Pilot on Douglas SC-47 Skytrain (Tail number 44-76330) shot down by Pathet Lao while on an intelligence gathering flight	Killed in action, body not recovered
April 22	Biber, Gerald M	Sergeant	US Army	FFT-59, B Company, 7th Special Forces Group (United States), MAAG Laos	Operation White Star	Laos, Vang Vieng	Training adviser to the Royal Lao Army, presumed killed in a Pathet Lao ambush	Killed in action, body not recovered
April 22	Bischoff, John M	Sergeant first class	US Army	FFT-59, B Company, 7th Special Forces Group, MAAG Laos	Operation White Star	Laos, Vang Vieng	Training adviser to the Royal Lao Army, presumed killed in a Pathet Lao ambush	Killed in action, body not recovered
April 22	Moon, Walter H	Captain	US Army	FFT-59, B Company, 7th Special Forces Group, MAAG Laos	Operation White Star	Laos, Vang Vieng	Training adviser to the Royal Lao Army, captured in a Pathet Lao ambush and executed on 22 July 1961	Died in captivity, remains not returned

== 1962 ==
Date missing	Surname, First name(s)	Rank	Service	Unit	Operation/Battle Name	Location	Circumstances of loss	Recovery status
May 30	Gerber, Daniel A	Civilian				South Vietnam, Ban Me Thuot	One of three Christian missionaries abducted by the Vietcong from the Ban Me Thuot Leprosarium	Unaccounted for
May 30	Mitchell, Archie E	Civilian				South Vietnam, Ban Me Thuot	One of three Christian missionaries abducted by the Vietcong from the Ban Me Thuot Leprosarium	Unaccounted for
May 30	Vietti, Eleanor A	Civilian				South Vietnam, Ban Me Thuot	One of three Christian missionaries abducted by the Vietcong from the Ban Me Thuot Leprosarium	Unaccounted for
July 14	Blewett, Alan L	Civilian	Bird and Sons			Laos, Vientiane	Bird and Sons Camair Twin Navion aircraft, tail number N229 disappeared on a flight from Vientiane to Pak Sane	Presumptive finding of death
July 14	Parks, Raymond F	Staff Sergeant	US Army	7th Special Forces Group	Operation White Star	Laos, Vientiane	Bird and Son Camair Twin Navion aircraft, tail number N229 disappeared on a flight from Vientiane to Pak Sane	Presumptive finding of death
August 28	Simpson, Robert L	Captain	USAF	6th Fighter Squadron (Commando)		South Vietnam, Bạc Liêu Province, Sóc Trăng	Killed when his T-28B (Tail number 53-8376) was hit by ground fire on a close air support mission	Killed in action, body not recovered
October 6	Anderson, Thomas E	Corporal	USMC	HMM-163		South Vietnam, Quảng Nam Province	Crew chief on a UH-34D Seahorse (Bureau Number 145790) which crashed due to mechanical failure	Killed in action, body not recovered

== 1963 ==
Date missing	Surname, First name(s)	Rank	Service	Unit	Operation/Battle Name	Location	Circumstances of loss	Recovery status
September 5	DeBruin, Eugene H	Civilian	Air America			Laos, Tchepone	His C-46 Commando (Tail number 0317) aircraft was hit by ground fire and crashed, the crew parachuted to safety and were captured by the Pathet Lao. Escaped Pathet Lao prison camp with Dieter Dengler, Duane W. Martin and others on 29 June 1966, last seen alive on that date.	Unaccounted for
November 24	Cody, Howard R	Captain	USAF	1st Air Commando Squadron		South Vietnam, Cà Mau	B-26 Invander (Tail number 44-35703) hit by ground fire and crashed, bodies of two other crewmen recovered	Killed in action, body not recovered
October 29	Versace, Humbert R	Captain	US Army	Detachment A-23 5th Special Forces Group		South Vietnam, An Xuyen Province	Captured by Vietcong while leading a CIDG patrol. On 28 September 1965, "Liberation Radio" announced the execution of Versace and MSGT Kenneth Roraback on 26 September in retaliation for the deaths of three Vietcong in Da Nang	Died in captivity, remains not returned
November 24	Roraback, Kenneth M	Master sergeant	US Army	Detachment A-21 5th Special Forces Group		South Vietnam, Hậu Nghĩa Province	One of four Americans captured by Vietcong in attack on Hiep Hoa Special Forces Camp. On 28 September 1965, "Liberation Radio" announced the execution of Roraback and Special Forces Captain Humbert Versace on 26 September in retaliation for the deaths of three Vietcong in Da Nang	Died in captivity, remains not returned
December 6	Hill, Richard D	Airman first class	USAF	21st Armament & Electronics Maintenance Squadron		South Vietnam, Kien Hoa Province	Crewman on RB-26L Invander (Tail number 44-35782), shot down on a photo-reconnaissance mission, bodies of two other crewmen recovered	Killed in action, body not recovered
December 6	Gorton, Thomas F	Captain	USAF	1st Air Commando Squadron		South Vietnam, Kien Hoa Province	Navigator of RB-26L Invander (Tail number 44-35782), shot down on a photo-reconnaissance mission, bodies of two other crewmen recovered	Killed in action, body not recovered
December 12	Angell, Marshall J	Sergeant	US Army	611th Transportation Company		South Vietnam, Dinh Tuong Province	Flight Engineer aboard a CH-37B Mojave (Tail number 55-00672) on a mission to recover a downed OV-1 Mohawk, The crew was attempting to sling-load the downed aircraft when the CH-37 was shot down, crashed and burned	Killed in action, body not recovered

== 1964 ==
Date missing	Surname, First name(s)	Rank	Service	Unit	Operation/Battle Name	Location	Circumstances of loss	Recovery status
January 14	Hickman, Vincent J	Captain	USAF	1st Air Commando Squadron		South Vietnam, Đồng Nai Province	Navigator on B-26B Invader (Tail number 44-35566), shot down while conducting air strike	Killed in action, body not recovered
January 14	Mitchell, Carl B	Major	USAF	1st Air Commando Squadron		South Vietnam, Đồng Nai Province	Pilot of B-26B Invader (Tail number 44-35566), shot down while conducting air strike	Killed in action, body not recovered
January 18	Metoyer, Bryford G	First lieutenant	USAF	UTT Helicopter Company, 145th Aviation Battalion		South Vietnam, Kien Hoa Province	Pilot of a UH-1B Iroquois (Tail number 62-01880) gunship hit by ground fire and ditched at sea, three other crewmen recovered	Killed in action, body not recovered
January 18	Straley, John L	Private first class	US Army	UTT Helicopter Company, 145th Aviation Battalion		South Vietnam, Kien Hoa Province	Crewman on a UH-1B Iroquois (Tail number 62-01880) hit by ground fire and ditched at sea, three other crewmen recovered	Killed in action, body not recovered
March 26	Whitesides, Richard L	Captain	USAF	19th Tactical Air Support Squadron		South Vietnam, Quảng Trị Province	Pilot of an O-1F Bird Dog shot down near the Quảng Trị Special Forces Camp. The passenger, Captain Floyd James Thompson was captured	Listed as killed in action, body not recovered until 21 October 2014 when his remains were identified
June 19	Ledbetter, Thomas I	Captain	US Army	Detachment A-133, 5th Special Forces Group		South Vietnam, Tây Ninh Province	Ambushed while leading a Montagnard patrol, last seen wounded	Killed in action, body not recovered
June 19	Talley, James L	Corporal	US Army	Detachment A-133, 5th Special Forces Group		South Vietnam, Tây Ninh Province	Ambushed while leading a Montagnard patrol	Killed in action, body not recovered
October 2	Walker, Kenneth E	Captain	USAF	1st Air Commando Squadron		South Vietnam, Sóc Trăng	His A-1E Skyraider (Tail number 52-132654) crashed while conducting a napalm attack at the mouth of the Mekong River	Killed in action, body not recovered
October 24	Woods, Lawrence	Staff sergeant	US Army	Headquarters Company, 5th Special Forces Group		South Vietnam, Quang Duc Province	Passenger on a C-123B Provider (Tail number 55-4549) shot down on aerial resupply mission near the South Vietnam-Cambodia border. No parachutes were seen to leave the aircraft as it crashed. Remains of the other seven passengers and crew recovered	Listed as killed in action, body not recovered until 27 September 2013 when his remains were identified
November 6	Dawson, Daniel G	First lieutenant	US Army	145th Aviation Battalion		South Vietnam, Biên Hòa Province	Pilot of on O-1F Bird Dog (Tail number 57-2782) flying a visual reconnaissance mission with a South Vietnamese observer. The aircraft was not heard from after takeoff	Killed in action, body not recovered
November 13	Bloom, Darl R	Captain	USMC	VMCJ-1		South Vietnam, Da Nang	His RF-8A Crusader (Bureau number 146679) collided with US Navy A-4C Skyhawk (bureau number 149570) "Lt(jg) James Herman Knollmueller (Survived)" and crashed into the sea	Killed in action, body not recovered
November 21	Nipper, David	Lance corporal	USMC	3rd Reconnaissance Battalion		South Vietnam, Bình Định Province	Crew on UH-34D Choctaw (Bureau number 150234) that crashed at sea	Killed in action, body not recovered
December 11	Tadios, Leonard M	Sergeant	US Army	SD-5891, HQ, MACV		South Vietnam, Phong Dinh Province	Adviser to Army of the Republic of Vietnam (ARVN), captured and died of disease/malnutrition	Died in captivity, remains not returned
December 22	Parks, Joe	Sergeant first class	US Army	SD-5891, HQ, MACV		South Vietnam, Vĩnh Bình province	Adviser to an ARVN unit captured in an ambush near Khanh Hung and died in 1967 of disease/malnutrition	Died in captivity, remains not returned
December 29	Bennett, Harold G	Corporal	US Army	BDQ Team TD-33, MACV Advisory Team 95		South Vietnam, Phước Tuy Province	Adviser to an ARVN unit, captured in an ambush and reported executed in June 1965 in retaliation for the execution of a Vietcong	Died in captivity, remains not returned
December 31	Cook, Donald G	Captain	USMC	3rd Marine Division		South Vietnam, Phước Tuy Province	Advisor to the 4th Battalion of the South Vietnamese marines, captured and reported to have died from Malaria on 8 December 1967	Died in captivity, remains not returned
December 31	Dodge, Edward R	Sergeant first class	US Army	Detachment C-1, 5th Special Forces Group		South Vietnam, Quảng Nam Province	Passenger in an O-1F Bird Dog (Tail number 57-2823) that crashed near Da Nang	Presumptive finding of death
December 31	McDonald, Kurt C	Captain	USAF	336th Tactical Fighter Squadron on temporary duty to 2nd Air Division		South Vietnam, Quảng Nam Province	Pilot of an O-1F Bird Dog (Tail number 57-2823) that crashed near Da Nang	Presumptive finding of death

== 1965 ==
Date missing	Surname, First name(s)	Rank	Service	Unit	Operation/Battle Name	Location	Circumstances of loss	Recovery status
February 9	McLean, James H	Specialist 4	US Army	Advisory Team 88 MACV		South Vietnam, Phước Long Province	Captured when Vietcong overran the Đức Phong Regional Forces camp. Last seen alive in 1966.	Presumptive finding of death
February 24	Frakes, Dwight G	Chief radioman	US Navy	VAH-2		South Vietnam, South China Sea	Radio Operator on Douglas A-3B Skywarrior (Bureau number 147664) aircraft that crashed into the sea soon after takeoff from the USS Coral Sea.	Killed in action, body not recovered
March 15	Clydesdale, Charles F	Lieutenant (LTJG)	US Navy	VA-95, USS Ranger		North Vietnam, Gulf of Tonkin	His A-1H Skyraider (Bureau Number 135375) suffered engine failure while returning from a ground attack mission and he ditched at sea but did not exit the aircraft.	Killed in action, body not recovered
March 29	Hume, Kenneth E	Lieutenant commander	US Navy	VF-154, USS Coral Sea		North Vietnam, Bach Long Vi	His F-8D Crusader (Bureau number 148668) was hit by ground fire crashed into the sea, no ejection seat or parachute was observed.	Killed in action, body not recovered
March 31	McKinley, Gerald W	Lieutenant junior grade	US Navy	VA-215, USS Hancock		North Vietnam, Quảng Bình Province	His A-1H Skyraider (Bureau number 137584) aircraft was hit by anti-aircraft fire and crashed during an attack on a radar station at Vinh	Killed in action, body not recovered
April 3	Smith, George C	1st Lieutenant	USAF	615th Tactical Fighter Squadron	Operation Rolling Thunder	North Vietnam, Thanh Hóa Province	His F-100D Super Sabre (Tail number 55-3625) was shot down while suppressing anti-aircraft fire during an attack on the Thanh Hóa Bridge.	Presumptive finding of death
April 4	Draeger, Walter F	Captain	USAF	1131st Special Activities Squadron	Operation Rolling Thunder	North Vietnam, Thanh Hóa province	His A-1H escorting search and rescue helicopters was shot down and seen to crash in flames, but no parachute was observed during an attack on the Thanh Hóa Bridge	Killed in action, body not recovered
April 4	Magnusson, James A	Captain	USAF	354th Tactical Fighter Squadron	Operation Rolling Thunder	North Vietnam, Hon Me	His F-105D Thunderchief (Tail number 59-1764) was damaged by a Mig-17 piloted by Le Minh Huan during an attack on the Thanh Hóa Bridge, he flew out to sea and was not recovered	Presumptive finding of death
April 9	Fegan, Ronald J	Ensign	US Navy	VF-96, USS Ranger		China, Hainan	Radar Intercept Officer in an F-4B Phantom II (Bureau Number 151403) apparently shot down by Chinese Mig-17 fighters.	Killed in action, body not recovered
April 9	Murphy, Terence M	Lieutenant (LTJG)	US Navy	VF-96, USS Ranger		China, Hainan	Pilot of F-4B Phantom II (Bureau Number 151403) apparently shot down by Chinese Mig-17 fighters.	Killed in action, body not recovered
April 17	Woodworth, Samuel A	Captain	USAF	562nd Tactical Fighter Squadron	Operation Rolling Thunder	North Vietnam, Mu Gia Pass	His F-105D thunderchief (Tail number 61-0171) failed to pull up after a bombing run, hit the ground and exploded.	Killed in action, body not recovered
April 29	Shelton, Charles E	Captain	USAF	5th Tactical Reconnaissance Squadron		Laos, Sam Neua	His RF-101C Voodoo (Tail number 56-0190) caught fire during a photo-run and he ejected and made contact with rescue forces. His recovery was delayed until 2 May due to bad weather by which time he had been captured by the Pathet Lao. He was last reported alive in 1968	Presumptive finding of death
May 8	Lahaye, James D	Commander	US Navy	VF-111, USS Midway	Operation Rolling Thunder	North Vietnam, Vinh	His F-8D Crusader (Bureau number 148637) was damaged by anti-aircraft fire and crashed into the sea, no ejection or parachute was observed	Killed in action, body not recovered
May 9	Wistrand, Robert C	Captain	USAF	561st Tactical Fighter Squadron	Operation Steel Tiger	Laos, Mu Gia Pass	His F-105D Thunderchief (Tail number 62-4408) crashed, no ejection or parachute observed	Presumptive finding of death
May 18	Hrdlicka, David L	Captain	USAF	563rd Tactical Fighter Squadron	Operation Steel Tiger	Laos, Sam Neua	Ejected from his F-105D Thunderchief (Tail number 59-1731) and captured by the Pathet Lao. His photo was featured in Quan Doi Nhan Dan and Pravda in 1966, last reported alive in 1968	Presumptive finding of death
May 18	Tavares, John R	Civilian				South Vietnam, Da Nang	Merchant seaman from the SS Audry J. Luchenback, a civilian freighter anchored in the Da Nang port, last seen at the Pacific Bar, Bạch Đằng Street, Da Nang	Unaccounted for
May 19	Donovan, Leroy M	Sergeant First Class	US Army	HQ, MACV		South Vietnam, Bình Định Province	Observer in an O-1F Bird Dog (Tail number 57-2935) that disappeared near Camp Holloway	Killed in action, body not recovered
May 19	Harper, Richard K	Warrant Officer	US Army	52nd Fixed Wing Platoon		South Vietnam, Bình Định Province	Pilot of an O-1F Bird Dog (Tail number 57-2935) that disappeared near Camp Holloway	Killed in action, body not recovered
May 23	Walker, Orien J	Captain	US Army	SD-5891, MACV Advisors		South Vietnam, An Xuyen Province	Adviser to the ARVN, captured by Vietcong in an ambush. Died of disease/malnutrition on 4 February 1966	Died in captivity, remains not returned
May 27	Lynn, Doyle W	Commander	US Navy	VF-111, USS Midway	Operation Rolling Thunder	North Vietnam, Nghệ An Province	His F-8D Crusader (Bureau number 148706) was hit by ground fire and crashed, no ejection or parachute observed	Killed in action, body not recovered
June 1	Crosby, Frederick P	Lieutenant Commander	US Navy	VFP-63, USS Bon Homme Richard		North Vietnam, Thanh Hóa Province	His RF-8A Crusader (Bureau number 146852) was shot down while conducting a low-altitude bomb damage assessment mission	Killed in action, body not recovered until May 2017 when his remains were identified
June 9	Dale, Charles A	1st Lieutenant	US Army	73rd Aviation Company		South Vietnam, Vĩnh Bình Province	Pilot of OV-1C Mohawk (Tail number 61-2687) shot down over the U Minh Forest	Presumptive finding of death
June 9	Demmon, David S	Sergeant	US Army	73rd Aviation Company		South Vietnam, Vĩnh Bình Province	Electronic sensor operator on OV-1C Mohawk (Tail number 61-2687) shot down over the U Minh Forest	Presumptive finding of death
June 10	Compa, Joseph J	Staff Sergeant	US Army	118th Aviation Company, 145th Aviation Battalion	Battle of Đồng Xoài	South Vietnam, Phước Long Province	Crew chief on UH-1B Iroquois (Tail number 63-038557) that crashed under heavy fire while making an emergency troop insertion into the area of the Đồng Xoài Special Forces Camp	Killed in action, body not recovered
June 10	Curlee, Robert L	Staff Sergeant	US Army	Advisory Team 70, HQ, MACV Advisors	Battle of Đồng Xoài	South Vietnam, Phước Long Province	Passenger on UH-1B Iroquois (Tail number 63-038557) that crashed under heavy fire while making an emergency troop insertion into the area of the Đồng Xoài Special Forces Camp, he survived the crash but was shot by Vietcong	Killed in action, body not recovered
June 10	Hagen, Craig L	Sergeant	US Army	118th Aviation Company, 145th Aviation Battalion	Battle of Đồng Xoài	South Vietnam, Phước Long Province	Door gunner on UH-1B Iroquois (Tail number 63-038557) that crashed under heavy fire while making an emergency troop insertion into the area of the Đồng Xoài Special Forces Camp	Killed in action, body not recovered
June 10	Hall, Walter L	1st Lieutenant	US Army	118th Aviation Company, 145th Aviation Battalion	Battle of Đồng Xoài	South Vietnam, Phước Long Province	Pilot of UH-1B Iroquois (Tail number 63-038557)) that crashed under heavy fire while making an emergency troop insertion into the area of the Đồng Xoài Special Forces Camp	Killed in action, body not recovered
June 10	Johnson, Bruce G	Captain	US Army	SD-5891 (5th ARVN Division), MACV Advisors	Battle of Đồng Xoài	South Vietnam, Phước Long Province	Survived crash of UH-1B Iroquois (Tail number 63-038557) and radioed that all others aboard had been killed and subsequently disappeared in the battle	Presumptive finding of death
June 10	Owens, Fred M	Sergeant First Class	US Army	SD-5891 (5th ARVN Division), MACV Advisors	Battle of Đồng Xoài	South Vietnam, Phước Long Province	Passenger on UH-1B Iroquois (Tail number 63-038557) that crashed under heavy fire while making an emergency troop insertion into the area of the Đồng Xoài Special Forces Camp, he survived the crash but was shot by Vietcong	Killed in action, body not recovered
June 10	Saergaert, Donald R	Warrant Officer	US Army	118th Aviation Company, 145th Aviation Battalion	Battle of Đồng Xoài	South Vietnam, Phước Long Province	Copilot of UH-1B Iroquois (Tail number 63-038557) that crashed under heavy fire while making an emergency troop insertion into the area of the Đồng Xoài Special Forces Camp	Killed in action, body not recovered
June 12	Holland, Lawrence T	Captain	USAF	615th Tactical Fighter Squadron	Battle of Đồng Xoài	South Vietnam, Phước Long Province	His F-100D Super Sabre (Tail number 55-3702, call sign "Edna 11") was hit by ground fire and he ejected safely, a search and rescue helicopter observed his body being dragged from his landing site	Killed in action, body not recovered
June 16	Schumann, John R	Captain	US Army	Advisory Team 75, HQ, MACV Advisors		South Vietnam, Dinh Tuong Province	He was serving as advisor to the Cai Be District Chief, when captured by the Vietcong	Died in captivity, remains not returned
June 18	Armond, Robert L	Captain	USAF	441st Bombardment Squadron	Operation Arc Light	South China Sea	Pilot of a B-52F #57-0047 that collided with another B-52F #57-0179 over the South China Sea	Killed in action, body not recovered
June 18	Gehrig, James M	Major	USAF	441st Bombardment Squadron	Operation Arc Light	South China Sea	Crewman aboard a B-52F #57-0047 that collided with another B-52F #57-0179 over the South China Sea	Killed in action, body not recovered
June 18	Lowry, Tyrrell G	Captain	USAF	441st Bombardment Squadron	Operation Arc Light	South China Sea	Crewman aboard a B-52F #57-0047 that collided with another B-52F #57-0179 over the South China Sea	Killed in action, body not recovered
June 18	Marshall, James A	1st Lieutenant	USAF	441st Bombardment Squadron	Operation Arc Light	South China Sea	Copilot of a B-52F #57-0047 that collided with another B-52F #57-0179 over the South China Sea	Killed in action, body not recovered
June 18	Neville, William E	Technical Sergeant	USAF	441st Bombardment Squadron	Operation Arc Light	South China Sea	Gunner aboard a B-52F #57-0047 that collided with another B-52F #57-0179 over the South China Sea	Killed in action, body not recovered
June 18	Roberts, Harold J	Master Sergeant	USAF	441st Bombardment Squadron	Operation Arc Light	South China Sea	Crewman aboard a B-52F #57-0047 that collided with another B-52F #57-0179 over the South China Sea	Killed in action, body not recovered
June 18	Watson, Frank P	Captain	USAF	441st Bombardment Squadron	Operation Arc Light	South China Sea	Crewman aboard a B-52F #57-0047 that collided with another B-52F #57-0179 over the South China Sea	Killed in action, body not recovered
June 24	Van Campen, Thomas C	Private First class	US Army	2nd Battalion, 503rd Infantry, 173rd Airborne Brigade		South Vietnam, Biên Hòa Province	His unit came under attack, he was wounded and separated from his unit. His body was not recovered due to heavy enemy fire	Killed in action, body not recovered
June 27	Jackson, Carl E	Captain	USAF	1131st Special Activities Squadron, MACV-SOG		South Vietnam, Biên Hòa Province	Pilot of a C-123B Provider (Tail number 54-641) that crashed on a classified night mission with 14 Chinese troops on board	Killed in action, body not recovered
June 27	Roth, Billie L	Staff Sergeant	USAF	37th Consolidated Maintenance Squadron		South Vietnam, Biên Hòa Province	Crewman on a C-123B Provider (Tail number 54-641) that crashed on a classified night mission with 14 Chinese troops on board	Killed in action, body not recovered
June 29	Lindsey, Marvin N	Major	USAF	15th Tactical Reconnaissance Squadron		North Vietnam, Sơn La Province	His RF-101C Voodoo (Tail number 56-0040) was hit by anti-aircraft fire, he apparently ejected and was killed on the ground	Presumptive finding of death
July 5	Eisenbraun, William F	Captain	US Army	Advisory Team 39, SD-5891, MACV Advisors		South Vietnam, Quảng Ngãi Province	Captured when the Vietcong overran the Ba Gia outpost. Died of injuries on 17 September 1967	Died in captivity, remains not returned
July 8	Bram, Richard C	Staff Sergeant	USMC	VMA-225		South Vietnam, Quảng Tín Province	Disappeared while hiking near Chu Lai Air Base, believed killed by Vietcong	Presumptive finding of death
July 8	Dingwall, John F	Gunnery Sergeant	USMC	VMA-225		South Vietnam, Quảng Tín Province	Disappeared while hiking near Chu Lai Air Base, believed killed by Vietcong	Presumptive finding of death
July 13	Gallant, Henry J	Master Sergeant	US Army	Detachment B-52, 5th Special Forces Group	Project DELTA	South Vietnam, Bình Định Province	Leader of Team 2, an eight-man South Vietnamese Special Forces long range reconnaissance patrol ambushed while gathering intelligence near Highway 19, he was wounded and last seen alive with Sergeant Taylor being pursued by enemy forces	Killed in action, body not recovered
July 13	Taylor, Fred	Sergeant First Class	US Army	Detachment B-52, 5th Special Forces Group	Project DELTA	South Vietnam, Bình Định Province	Adviser Team 2, an eight-man South Vietnamese Special Forces long range reconnaissance patrol ambushed while gathering intelligence near Highway 19, he was last seen alive with Master Sergeant Gallant being pursued by enemy forces	Killed in action, body not recovered
July 18	Avore, Malcolm A	Lieutenant	US Navy	VA-163		South Vietnam	His A-4E Skyhawk (Bureau number 151089) ditched following launch from the USS Oriskany and he was unable to escape the sinking aircraft	Killed in action, body not recovered
July 27	Kosko, Walter	Captain	USAF	563rd Tactical Fighter Squadron		North Vietnam, Phú Thọ Province	His F-105D Thunderchief (Tail number 62-4252) was hit by anti-aircraft fire and he was seen to eject and land in the Black River	Presumptive finding of death
July 29	Brown, Edward D	Lieutenant (LTJG)	US Navy	VF-191, USS Bon Homme Richard		South Vietnam, Vĩnh Bình Province	His F-8E Crusader (Bureau number 150337) failed to pull up from a strafing run and impacted the ground, no ejection observed	Killed in action, body not recovered
August 2	Hail, William W	Captain	USAF	1131st Special Activities Squadron, MACV		South Vietnam	His A-1H #132625 disappeared	Presumptive finding of death
August 3	Bower, Joseph E	Major	USAF	421st Tactical Fighter Squadron	Operation Rolling Thunder	North Vietnam, Gulf of Tonkin	His F-105D Thunderchief (Tail number 61-0098) was hit by enemy fire and he ejected but hit the sea at high speed and was believed to have died on impact	Killed in action, body not recovered
August 7	Gray, Harold E	Lieutenant Commander	US Navy	VA-25, USS Midway		North Vietnam, Đồng Hới	Hi A-1H #135329 was hit by anti-aircraft fire during an attack on a People's Army of Vietnam (PAVN) barracks at Đồng Hới	Killed in action, body not recovered
August 10	Mailhes, Lawrence S	Lieutenant (LTJG)	US Navy	VA-152, USS Oriskany		North Vietnam, Gulf of Tonkin	His A-1J Skyraider (Bureau number 142021, call sign "Locket 583") disappeared over water	Killed in action, body not recovered
August 13	Mellor, Frederic M	Captain	USAF	20th Tactical Reconnaissance Squadron		North Vietnam, Sơn La Province	His RF-101C #56-0186 was hit by enemy fire, he successfully ejected and radioed that he was on the ground without serious injury. When the search and rescue helicopter approached the area they were unable to make radio contact with him	Presumptive finding of death until August 2018 when he was accounted for
September 3	Jewell, Eugene M	1st Lieutenant	USAF	47th Tactical Fighter Squadron		North Vietnam, Nghệ An Province	Weapons Systems Operator on F-4C #63-7700 shot down during a low-altitude strafing run, the aircraft crashed and exploded. No parachutes observed The remains of the pilot Captain James Branch were identified in June 1993	Presumptive finding of death
September 5	LaGrand, William J	Chief Warrant Officer	US Army	197th Aviation Company, 145th Aviation Battalion		South Vietnam, Biên Hòa Province	Passenger in an A-1G Skyraider (Tail number 132562) that crashed, no ejection or parachutes observed	Killed in action, body not recovered
September 5	Marshall, Richard C	Captain	USAF	1131st Special Activities Squadron		South Vietnam, Biên Hòa Province	Pilot of an A-1G Skyraider (Tail number 132562) that crashed, no ejection or parachutes observed	Killed in action, body not recovered
September 5	Shaw, Edward B	Lieutenant (LTJG)	US Navy	VA-165, USS Coral Sea		North Vietnam, Vinh	His A-1H #139693 was hit by antiaircraft fire while attacking supply barges on the Song Gia Hoi River and crashed, no ejection or parachute observed	Killed in action, body not recovered
September 8	Goodwin, Charles B	Lieutenant (LTJG)	US Navy	VFP-63, USS Coral Sea		North Vietnam, Gulf of Tonkin	His RF-8A #146826 crashed into the sea 5 miles (8.0 km) east of Quang Khe	Presumptive finding of death until 3 June 2017 when he was accounted for
September 12	Green, Gerald	Lieutenant (LTJG)	US Navy	VF-191, USS Bon Homme Richard		North Vietnam, Gulf of Tonkin	His F-8E Crusader (Bureau number 150331) was hit by anti-aircraft fire over Thanh Hóa Province and crashed at sea	Killed in action, body not recovered
September 13	Mossman, Joe R	Lieutenant (LTJG)	US Navy	VA-72, USS Independence		North Vietnam, Quảng Bình Province	His A-4E Skyhawk (Bureau number 149999) was hit by anti-aircraft fire, no ejection observed	Killed in action, body not recovered
September 14	Taylor, Neil B	Lieutenant (LTJG)	US Navy	VA-192, USS Bon Homme Richard		South Vietnam, Kiên Giang Province	His A-4C Skyhawk (Bureau number 147682) crashed	Killed in action, body not recovered
September 17	Klenda, Dean A	1st Lieutenant	USAF	67th Tactical Fighter Squadron		North Vietnam, Sơn La Province	His F-105D #62-4247, was hit by anti-aircraft fire while attacking a barracks east of Na San, no ejection observed	Presumptive finding of death until 1 March 2016 when his remains were recovered
September 18	Barber, Robert F	Lieutenant	US Navy	VA-75, USS Independence		North Vietnam, Bach Long Vi	Bombardier/navigator of an A-6A #151588 that crashed into the sea while attacking Vietnam People's Navy torpedo boats	Killed in action, body not recovered
September 18	Vogt, Leonard F	Commander	US Navy	VA-75, USS Independence		North Vietnam, Bach Long Vi	Pilot of an A-6A #151588 that crashed into the sea while attacking North Vietnamese Navy torpedo boats	Killed in action, body not recovered
September 20	Hawkins, Edgar L	Captain	USAF	67th Tactical Fighter Squadron	Operation Rolling Thunder	North Vietnam, Sơn La Province	His F-105D Thunderchief (Tail number 62-4238, call sign "Elm 02") hit the ground during a rocket attack, no ejection observed	Presumptive finding of death
September 20	Martin, Duane W	1st Lieutenant	USAF	Detachment 1, 38th Aerospace Rescue and Recovery Squadron		North Vietnam, Hà Tĩnh Province	Copilot of an HH-43B #62-4510 shot down on a search and rescue mission, he was captured by the Pathet Lao. Escaped Pathet Lao prison camp with Dieter Dengler, Eugene DeBruin and others on 29 June 1966. Dengler saw him being killed by a Lao villager several days after their escape	Died in captivity, remains not returned
September 24	Osborn, Geoffrey H	Lieutenant (LTJG)	US Navy	VF-194, USS Bon Homme Richard		North Vietnam, Gulf of Tonkin	His F-8E Crusader (Bureau number: 150668) crashed into the sea	Killed in action, body not recovered
October 1	Massucci, Martin J	1st Lieutenant	USAF	432nd Tactical Fighter Squadron	Operation Rolling Thunder	North Vietnam, Sơn La Province	Copilot of an F-4C #63-7712 hit by anti-aircraft fire, one parachute observed. The remains of the pilot Captain Charles J Scharf were identified in 2006	Presumptive finding of death
October 5	Pogreba, Dean A	Lieutenant Colonel	USAF	On temporary duty to 36th Tactical Fighter Squadron	Operation Rolling Thunder	North Vietnam, Lạng Sơn province	His F-105D Thunderchief (Tail number 62-4295) was hit by anti-aircraft fire	Presumptive finding of death
October 17	Mayer, Roderick L	Lieutenant	US Navy	VF-41, USS Independence	Operation Rolling Thunder	North Vietnam	Pilot of on F-4B Phantom II (Bureau number: 150631, call sign: "Egg Shell 105") hit by anti-aircraft fire during an attack on the Thái Nguyên bridge, observed to have ejected from the aircraft	Presumptive finding of death
October 17	Olmstead, Stanley E	Lieutenant Commander	US Navy	VF-84, USS Independence	Operation Rolling Thunder	North Vietnam, Lạng Sơn Province	Pilot of an F-4B B Phantom II (Bureau number 151515) hit by anti-aircraft fire, no ejection or parachutes observed. The radar intercept officer, LTJG Porter A. Halyburton did eject, was captured and released in Operation Homecoming	Presumptive finding of death
October 18	Thorne, Larry A	Major (posthumous)	US Army	MACV-SOG	Operation Shining Brass	Laos-Vietnam border	Supervising the air insertion of a reconnaissance team into Laos when his H-34 Kingbee #148790 crashed	Missing in action; remains recovered in 1999 and identified in 2003
October 19	Worcester, John B	Lieutenant (LTJG)	US Navy	VA-195, USS Bon Homme Richard	Operation Rolling Thunder	North Vietnam, Nghệ An Province	His A-4C Skyhawk (Bureau number 148584, call sign "Chippie 512") disappeared on a ground attack mission	Presumptive finding of death
October 22	Mann, Robert L	Captain	USAF	9th Tactical Reconnaissance Squadron		South Vietnam, Kon Tum Province	Pilot of an RB-66B #53-0452 that crashed	Killed in action, body not recovered
October 22	McEwan, James A	1st Lieutenant	USAF	9th Tactical Reconnaissance Squadron		South Vietnam, Kon Tum Province	Crewman on an RB-66B #53-0452 that crashed	Killed in action, body not recovered
October 22	Weger, John	1st Lieutenant	USAF	9th Tactical Reconnaissance Squadron		South Vietnam, Kon Tum province	Crewman on an RB-66B #53-0452 that crashed	Killed in action, body not recovered
October 31	Adams, Samuel	Staff Sergeant	USAF	6250th Support Squadron		South Vietnam, Biên Hòa Province	Captured by Vietcong while travelling on Route 15 from Vũng Tàu to Saigon, attempted escape on 2 November and last seen alive on that date	Died in captivity, remains not returned
October 31	Dusing, Charles G	Staff Sergeant	USAF	6250th Support Squadron		South Vietnam, Biên Hòa Province	Captured by Vietcong while travelling on Route 15 from Vũng Tàu to Saigon, attempted escape on 2 November and last seen alive on that date	Died in captivity, remains not returned
October 31	Moore, Thomas	Technical Sergeant	USAF	6250th Support Squadron		South Vietnam, Biên Hòa Province	Captured by Vietcong while travelling on Route 15 from Vũng Tàu to Saigon, attempted escape on 2 November and last seen alive on that date	Died in captivity, remains not returned
November 3	Bowles, Dwight P	Captain	USAF	562nd Tactical Fighter Squadron	Operation Rolling Thunder	North Vietnam	His F-105D #61-0163 flew into the ground on a bombing run, no ejection observed	Killed in action, body not recovered
November 14	McClellan, Paul T	Captain	USAF	1st Air Commando Squadron	Battle of Ia Drang	South Vietnam, Pleiku Province	His A-1E #52-132898 was hit by ground fire and crashed near LZ X-Ray, no ejection observed	Killed in action, body not recovered
November 16	Green, Donald G	Captain	USAF	469th Tactical Fighter Squadron	Operation Rolling Thunder	North Vietnam, Gulf of Tonkin	His F-105D #62-4332, was hit by fragments from an SA-2 Guideline, he flew his damaged plane out to sea and crashed	Killed in action, body not recovered
November 17	Hiemer, Jerry A	Specialist 4	US Army	2nd Battalion, 7th Cavalry	Battle of Ia Drang	South Vietnam, Pleiku Province	He was reported to have been shot several times and killed but his body could not be located	Presumptive finding of death
November 21	Toms, Dennis L	Seaman Apprentice	US Navy	VA-192, USS Bon Homme Richard		South Vietnam, South China Sea	Lost overboard while arming aircraft	Killed in action, body not recovered
November 22	Douglas, Thomas E	Corporal	USMC	HMM-362		South Vietnam, Quảng Tín Province	Crewman on UH-34D Choctaw (Bureau number 147180) that crashed at sea in bad weather	Presumptive finding of death
November 22	Miller, Richard A	1st Lieutenant	USMC	HMM-362		South Vietnam, Quảng Tín Province	Copilot of UH-34D Choctaw (Bureau number 147180) that crashed at sea in bad weather	Presumptive finding of death
November 22	Pirker, Victor J	Corporal	USMC	HMM-362		South Vietnam, Quảng Tín Province	Crewman on a UH-34D Choctaw (Bureau number 147180) that crashed at sea in bad weather	Presumptive finding of death
November 22	Visconti, Francis	1st Lieutenant	USMC	HMM-362		South Vietnam, Quảng Tín Province	Pilot of a UH-34D that crashed at sea in bad weather	Presumptive finding of death
November 22	Winkler, John A	Seaman Apprentice	US Navy	USS Bon Homme Richard		South Vietnam, South China Sea	Lost overboard	Killed in action, body not recovered
November 30	Richardson, Stephen G	Lieutenant (LTJG)	US Navy	VF-53, USS Ticonderoga		South Vietnam, South China Sea	His F-8E Crusader (Bureau number 149176) crashed at sea	Killed in action, body not recovered
December 2	Austin, Carl B	Commander	US Navy	VF-114, USS Kitty Hawk	Operation Rolling Thunder	North Vietnam	Pilot of F-4B Phantom II (Bureau number 152220)	Killed in action, body not recovered
December 2	Logan, Jacob D	Lieutenant (LTJG)	US Navy	VF-114, USS Kitty Hawk	Operation Rolling Thunder	North Vietnam	Radar Intercept Officer on F-4B Phantom II (Bureau number 152220)	Killed in action, body not recovered
December 3	Johnson, Stanley G	1st Lieutenant	USMC	HMM-364		South Vietnam, Hiep Duc District	Copilot of a UH-34D Seahorse (Bureau number 148762) transporting ARVN troops when it was hit by a mortar round, caught fire and crashed killing all four crewmen and the nine ARVN onboard	Killed in action, body not recovered
December 5	Dibble, Morris F	Private First Class	US Army	2nd Battalion, 2nd Infantry Regiment	Battle of Ap Nha Mat	South Vietnam, Bình Dương Province	Shot and killed in a Vietcong ambush, body unable to be recovered	Killed in action, body not recovered
December 5	Eisenberger, George J	Sergeant	US Army	2nd Battalion, 2nd Infantry Regiment	Battle of Ap Nha Mat	South Vietnam, Bình Dương Province	Shot and killed in a Vietcong ambush, body unable to be recovered	Killed in action, body not recovered
December 5	Upner, Edward C	Staff Sergeant	US Army	2nd Battalion, 2nd Infantry Regiment	Battle of Ap Nha Mat	South Vietnam, Bình Dương Province	Shot and killed in a Vietcong ambush, body unable to be recovered	Killed in action, body not recovered
December 5	Hyde, Jimmy D	Electrician's Mate, 3rd Class	US Navy	USS Dynamic		South Vietnam, Vũng Tàu	Drowned	Killed in action, body not recovered
December 8	Corle, John T	Corporal	USMC	HMM-364		South Vietnam, Quảng Tín Province	Gunner on a UH-34D Choctaw (Bureau number 145768) hit by ground fire, crashed into the sea and sank	Killed in action, body not recovered
December 15	Clark, Jerry P	Warrant Officer	US Army	568th Signal Company		South Vietnam, Phú Yên Province	His O-1D Bird Dog (Tail number 55-4686) suffered engine failure and crash-landed in shallow water near Qui Nhơn, search and rescue teams were unable to locate him and his rescue gear	Presumptive finding of death
December 16	Wickham, David W	Lieutenant	US Navy	VA-113, USS Kitty Hawk		North Vietnam, Gulf of Tonkin	His A-4C Skyhawk (Bureau Number 148510) crashed while landing on the USS Kitty Hawk	Killed in action, body not recovered
December 20	Mims, George I	1st Lieutenant	USAF	433rd Tactical Fighter Squadron	Operation Rolling Thunder	North Vietnam	Weapons system officer on an F-4C Phantom II (Tail number 64‑0678) that was hit by enemy fire. The pilot Captain Robert Jeffrey ejected, was captured and released in Operation Homecoming	Presumptive finding of death
December 20	Nordahl, Lee E	Lieutenant (LTJG)	US Navy	RVAH-13, USS Kitty Hawk	Operation Rolling Thunder	North Vietnam	Copilot of an RA-5C Vigilante (Bureau number 151624) that was hit by enemy fire and crashed. The remains of the pilot LCDR Guy D Johnson were returned in 1977	Presumptive finding of death
December 22	Lukenbach, Max D	Lieutenant Commander	US Navy	RVAH-13, USS Kitty Hawk	Operation Rolling Thunder	North Vietnam, Hai Hung province	Pilot of an RA-5C Vigilante (Bureau number 151632) hit by an SA-2 missile. The navigator, LTJG Glenn H Daigle successfully ejected, was captured and released in Operation Homecoming	Killed in action, body not recovered
December 22	Prudhomme, John D	Lieutenant	US Navy	VA-76, USS Enterprise	Operation Rolling Thunder	North Vietnam	His A-4C Skyhawk (Bureau number 149521) was hit by enemy fire and crashed	Killed in action, body not recovered
December 25	Bailon, Ruben	Civilian				South Vietnam, Qui Nhơn	Merchant Marine seaman aboard the ship SS Express Baltimore, he and the second officer, Stephen O'Laughlin went ashore in Qui Nhơn and disappeared. In June 1973 remains later identified as those of O'Laughlin were recovered from a grave in Phú Yên Province	Unaccounted for
December 29	Hill, Arthur S	Lieutenant	US Navy	VF-92, USS Enterprise	Operation Barrel Roll	Laos, Mu Gia Pass	Radar intercept officer of F-4B Phantom II (Bureau number 151412) that was hit by enemy fire	Killed in action, body not recovered
December 29	Rawsthorne, Edgar A	Commander	US Navy	VF-92, USS Enterprise	Operation Barrel Roll	Laos, Mu Gia Pass	Pilot of F-4B Phantom II (Bureau number 151412) that was hit by enemy fire	Killed in action, body not recovered

== See also ==
- List of United States servicemembers and civilians missing in action during the Vietnam War (1966–67)
- List of United States servicemembers and civilians missing in action during the Vietnam War (1968–69)
- List of United States servicemembers and civilians missing in action during the Vietnam War (1970–71)
- List of United States servicemembers and civilians missing in action during the Vietnam War (1972–75)
- Vietnam War POW/MIA issue
- Joint POW/MIA Accounting Command
- Defense Prisoner of War/Missing Personnel Office
- Defense POW/MIA Accounting Agency
