= List of United States servicemembers and civilians missing in action during the Vietnam War (1972–1975) =

This article is a list of US MIAs of the Vietnam War in the period from 1972–75. No servicemembers or civilians were lost in 1974. In 1973, the United States listed 2,646 Americans as unaccounted for from the entire Vietnam War. By October 2022, 1,582 Americans remained unaccounted for, of which 1,004 were classified as further pursuit, 488 as non-recoverable and 90 as deferred.

== 1972 ==
Date missing	Surname, First name(s)	Rank	Service	Unit	Operation/Battle Name	Location	Circumstances of loss	Recovery status
January 20	Berdahl, David D	Private first class	US Army	3rd Squadron, 5th Cavalry Regiment		South Vietnam, Quảng Trị Province	Door gunner on a UH-1H helicopter #69-16717 hit by anti-aircraft fire on a search and rescue mission and crashed, he was trapped in the helicopter which was seen to explode	Killed in action, body not recovered
January 20	Edwards, Harry J	Specialist	US Army	3rd Squadron, 5th Cavalry Regiment		South Vietnam, Quảng Trị Province	Rifleman on a UH-1H #69-16717 hit by anti-aircraft fire on a search and rescue mission, crashed and was seen to explode	Killed in action, body not recovered
February 4	Cooper, Daniel D	Lieutenant	US Navy	VA-22, USS Coral Sea		South Vietnam, Gulf of Tonkin	His A-7E #156870 ran out of fuel and crashed at night while waiting for landing	Killed in action, body not recovered
February 16	Lee, Albert R	Aviation structural mechanic first class	US Navy	VF-111, USS Coral Sea		South Vietnam	Lost overboard	Killed in action, body not recovered
February 25	Morgan, William J	Major	US Army	Adviser, Military Region 1, CORDS		South Vietnam, Da Nang	Passenger on UH-1H #69-15391 that hit the fantail of USS John R. Craig and crashed into Da Nang Harbour	Killed in action, body not recovered
March 7	Howell, Carter A	First lieutenant	USAF	4th Tactical Fighter Squadron		Laos, Saravane Province	Pilot of an F-4E seen to impact the ground on a bombing run, no ejection observed. In 2003 the remains of the weapons system officer, 1st Lieutenant Stephen A Rusch were recovered.	Presumptive finding of death
March 23	Jackson, James T	Captain	USAF	25th Tactical Fighter Squadron	Operation Steel Tiger	Laos, Savannakhet Province	Weapons system officer on an F-4D #66-8792 which crashed inverted while pulling up from a bombing run	Killed in action, body not recovered
March 23	Whitt, James E	Major	USAF	25th Tactical Fighter Squadron	Operation Steel Tiger	Laos, Savannakhet Province	Pilot of an F-4D which crashed inverted while pulling up from a bombing run	Killed in action, body not recovered
March 23	Pike, Dennis S	Lieutenant	US Navy	VA-192, USS Kitty Hawk		Laos	His A-7E suffered engine failure and he was seen to eject	Presumptive finding of death
March 27	Crow, Raymond J	Airman first class	USAF	40th Aerospace Rescue and Recovery Squadron		Cambodia, Stoeng Treng Province	Pararescueman on HH-53C #66-10359 Jolly Green 61 that crashed on a rescue mission. A pararescueman was lowered to the crash site but was unable to identify any remains in the burnt-out wreckage	Killed in action, body not recovered
March 27	Dreher, Richard E	Captain	USAF	40th Aerospace Rescue and Recovery Squadron		Cambodia, Stoeng Treng Province	Copilot of an HH-53C that crashed on a rescue mission	Killed in action, body not recovered
March 27	Manor, James	Senior Airman	USAF	40th Aerospace Rescue and Recovery Squadron		Cambodia, Stoeng Treng Province	Pararescueman on an HH-53C that crashed on a rescue mission	Killed in action, body not recovered
March 27	Pannabecker, David E	Captain	USAF	40th Aerospace Rescue and Recovery Squadron		Cambodia, Stoeng Treng Province	Pilot of an HH-53C that crashed on a rescue mission	Killed in action, body not recovered
March 27	Wagner, Raymond A	Airman first class	USAF	40th Aerospace Rescue and Recovery Squadron		Cambodia, Stoeng Treng Province	Pararescueman on an HH-53C that crashed on a rescue mission	Killed in action, body not recovered
March 27	Wong, Edward P	Specialist 4	US Army	57th Assault Helicopter Company		South Vietnam, Kon Tum Province	Door gunner on UH-1H #67-17841 that was hit by enemy fire and crashed, he was injured and carried on a litter by Army of the Republic of Vietnam (ARVN) troops to a Fire Support Base, but was not seen again	Presumptive finding of death
March 30	Crosby, Bruce A	Specialist 4	US Army	8th Radio Research Field Station	Easter Offensive	South Vietnam, Cam Lo District	Killed when a rocket hit the radio bunker at Firebase Sarge	Killed in action, body not recovered
March 30	Westcott, Gary P	Specialist 5	US Army	8th Radio Research Field Station	Easter Offensive	South Vietnam, Cam Lo District	Killed when a rocket hit the radio bunker at FSB Sarge	Killed in action, body not recovered
April 1	Worth, James F	Corporal	USMC	Sub-unit 1, 1st ANGLICO	Easter Offensive	South Vietnam, Firebase Gio Linh	Missing following a People's Army of Vietnam (PAVN) attack	Presumptive finding of death
April 2	Bolte, Wayne L	Major	USAF	42nd Tactical Electronic Warfare Squadron	Easter Offensive	South Vietnam, Quảng Trị Province	Pilot of EB-66C #54-0466 call sign Bat 21 hit by an SA-2 missile	Presumptive finding of death
April 2	Gatwood, Robin F	1st Lieutenant	USAF	42nd Tactical Electronic Warfare Squadron	Easter Offensive	South Vietnam, Quảng Trị Province	Copilot of EB-66C #54-0466 call sign Bat 21 hit by an SA-2 missile	Presumptive finding of death
April 2	Giannangeli, Anthony R	Lieutenant Colonel	USAF	42nd Tactical Electronic Warfare Squadron	Easter Offensive	South Vietnam, Quảng Trị Province	Electronic warfare officer on EB-66C #54-0466 call sign Bat 21 hit by an SA-2 missile	Presumptive finding of death
April 2	Levis, Charles A	Lieutenant Colonel	USAF	42nd Tactical Electronic Warfare Squadron	Easter Offensive	South Vietnam, Quảng Trị Province	Electronic warfare officer on EB-66C #54-0466 call sign Bat 21 hit by an SA-2 missile	Presumptive finding of death
April 2	Serex, Henry M	Major	USAF	42nd Tactical Electronic Warfare Squadron	Easter Offensive	South Vietnam, Quảng Trị Province	Electronic warfare officer on EB-66C #54-0466 call sign Bat 21 hit by an SA-2 missile	Presumptive finding of death
April 3	Christensen, Allen D	Sergeant	US Army	37th Signal Battalion		South Vietnam, Quảng Trị Province	Crew chief on a UH-1H #68-16330 that crashed in heavy cloud flying from Marble Mountain Air Facility to Quảng Trị	Presumptive finding of death
April 3	O'Neill, Douglas L	Chief Warrant Officer	US Army	37th Signal Battalion		South Vietnam, Quảng Trị Province	Copilot on a UH-1H #68-16330 that crashed in heavy cloud flying from Marble Mountain Air Facility to Quảng Trị	Presumptive finding of death
April 3	Williams, Edward W	Specialist 4	US Army	37th Signal Battalion		South Vietnam, Quảng Trị Province	Door gunner on a UH-1H #68-16330 that crashed in heavy cloud flying from Marble Mountain Air Facility to Quảng Trị	Presumptive finding of death
April 3	Zich, Larry A	Chief Warrant Officer	US Army	37th Signal Battalion		South Vietnam, Quảng Trị Province	Pilot of a UH-1H #68-16330 that crashed in heavy cloud flying from Marble Mountain Air Facility to Quảng Trị	Presumptive finding of death until October 2022 when he was accounted for
April 3	Muren, Thomas R	Fireman Apprentice	US Navy	USS John R. Craig		North Vietnam, Gulf of Tonkin	Lost overboard	Killed in action, body not recovered
April 7	Lull, Howard B	Master Sergeant	US Army	Advisory Team 70, MACV	Easter Offensive	South Vietnam, Loc Ninh District	Disappeared evading capture after his position was overrun by People's Army of Vietnam (PAVN) forces	Presumptive finding of death
April 7	Potts, Larry F	1st Lieutenant	USMC	Sub-unit 1, 1st ANGLICO	Easter Offensive	South Vietnam, Quảng Trị Province	Observer on an OV-10A #68-3820, call sign Covey 282 hit by anti-aircraft fire, ejected successfully, believed captured	Presumptive finding of death
April 7	Walker, Bruce C	1st Lieutenant	USAF	20th Tactical Air Support Squadron	Easter Offensive	South Vietnam, Quảng Trị Province	Pilot of an OV-10A #68-3820, call sign Covey 282 hit by anti-aircraft fire, ejected successfully, evaded capture for 11 days, last seen by a search and rescue helicopter with PAVN troops closing in around him	Presumptive finding of death
April 9	Ketchie, Scott D	1st Lieutenant	USMC	VMA-224, USS Coral Sea		Laos, Savannakhet Province	Copilot of an A-6A hit by anti-aircraft fire. The pilot ejected successfully and was rescued	Presumptive finding of death
April 13	Christensen, John M	1st Lieutenant	USMC	VMCJ-1	Operation Freedom Train	North Vietnam, Gulf of Tonkin	Electronic warfare officer on an EA-6A #156979 that disappeared on a night mission	Presumptive finding of death
April 13	Leet, David L	Captain	USMC	VCMJ-1	Operation Freedom Train	North Vietnam, Gulf of Tonkin	Pilot an EA-6A #156979 that disappeared on a night mission	Presumptive finding of death
April 14	Greenleaf, Joseph G	Lieutenant	US Navy	VF-114, USS Kitty Hawk	Easter Offensive	South Vietnam, Cam Lo District	Pilot of an F-4J hit by ground fire and seen to hit the ground with no ejection observed. The remains of the weapons systems office Lt. Clemie McKinney were returned in 1985	Killed in action, body not recovered
April 16	Jones, Orvin C	Captain	USAF	17th Tactical Fighter Squadron	Operation Freedom Train	North Vietnam, Haiphong	Weapons systems officer on an F-105G hit by anti-aircraft fire and crashed in Haiphong harbour	Presumptive finding of death
April 16	Mateja, Alan P	Captain	USAF	17th Tactical Fighter Squadron	Operation Freedom Train	North Vietnam, Haiphong	Pilot of an F-105G hit by anti-aircraft fire and crashed in Haiphong harbour	Presumptive finding of death
April 24	Brownlee, Robert W	Lieutenant Colonel	US Army	Advisory Team 22, MACV	Easter Offensive	South Vietnam, Kon Tum Province	District senior adviser disappeared while evading capture after the PAVN overran Đắk Tô Base Camp	Presumptive finding of death
April 24	Carter, George W	Major	US Army	Advisory Team 22, MACV	Easter Offensive	South Vietnam, Kon Tum Province	Evacuated as PAVN overran Đắk Tô Base Camp, UH-1H #69-15715 was hit by enemy fire and crashed	Killed in action, body not recovered
April 24	Ellen, Wade L	Warrant Officer	US Army	57th Assault Helicopter Company	Easter Offensive	South Vietnam, Kon Tum Province	Copilot of UH-1H #69-15715 which was hit by enemy fire and crashed while evacuating advisers from Đắk Tô Base Camp	Killed in action, body not recovered
April 24	Hunsicker, James E	Lieutenant	US Army	57th Assault Helicopter Company	Easter Offensive	South Vietnam, Kon Tum Province	Pilot of UH-1H #69-15715 which was hit by enemy fire and crashed while evacuating advisers from Đắk Tô Base Camp	Killed in action, body not recovered
April 24	Jones, Johnny M	1st Lieutenant	US Army	17th Aviation Group	Easter Offensive	South Vietnam	Evacuated as PAVN overran Đắk Tô Base Camp, UH-1H #69-15715 was hit by enemy fire and crashed	Killed in action, body not recovered
April 24	Zollicoffer, Franklin	Specialist 4	US Army	Army Installation Pleiku	Easter Offensive	South Vietnam	Medic on UH-1H #69-15715 which was hit by enemy fire and crashed while evacuating advisers from Đắk Tô Base Camp	Killed in action, body not recovered
April 26	Dunn, Richard E	Technical Sergeant	USAF	CCK Air Force Base on temporary duty to 345th Tactical Airlift Squadron	Battle of An Loc	South Vietnam, An Loc	Loadmaster on a C-130E #64-0508 shot down while making a night supply drop to the garrison at An Loc	Killed in action, body not recovered
April 26	Russell, Richard L	1st Lieutenant	USAF	CCK Air Force Base on temporary duty to 345th Tactical Airlift Squadron	Battle of An Loc	South Vietnam	Navigator on a C-130E #64-0508 shot down while making a night supply drop to the garrison at An Loc	Killed in action, body not recovered
April 26	Reynolds, Terry L	Civilian				Cambodia, Prey Veng Province	Reporter for UPI captured by Khmer Rouge with Australian photographer Alan Hirons and Cambodian photographer Chhim Sarath on Route 1	Presumptive finding of death
April 30	Seagraves, Melvin D	Seaman	US Navy	USS Tripoli		North Vietnam, Gulf of Tonkin	Lost overboard	Killed in action, body not recovered
May 3	McDonald, Joseph W	1st Lieutenant	USMC	VMA-224, USS Coral Sea	Operation Freedom Train	North Vietnam, Quảng Bình Province	Pilot of an A-6A #155709 shot down. The remains of the weapons system operator Captain David B. Williams were returned in 1989	Presumptive finding of death
May 6	Wiles, Marvin B	Lieutenant	US Navy	VA-22, USS Coral Sea	Operation Freedom Train	North Vietnam	His A-7E was hit by an SA-2 while attacking a SAM site, ejected successfully	Presumptive finding of death
May 7	Consolvo, John W	Captain	USMC	VMFA-212	Easter Offensive	South Vietnam, Quảng Trị Province	Pilot of an F-4J #155576 hit by enemy fire while attacking SAM missile transporters, no ejection observed	Presumptive finding of death
May 8	Leaver, John M	Commander	US Navy	Cruiser-Destroyer Flotilla II		North Vietnam, Gulf of Tonkin	Passenger in an SH-3G helicopter which crashed while landing on USS Providence at night	Killed in action, body not recovered
May 8	Taylor, Jr. Edmund B	Captain	US Navy	Cruiser-Destroyer Flotilla II		North Vietnam, Gulf of Tonkin	Passenger in an SH-3G helicopter which crashed while landing on USS Providence at night	Killed in action, body not recovered
May 11	Strobridge, Rodney L	Captain	US Army	79th Aerial Rocket Artillery, 1st Cavalry Division	Battle of An Loc	South Vietnam, An Loc	Copilot of an AH-1G #69-15009 hit by ground fire	Presumptive finding of death
May 11	Williams, Robert J	Captain	US Army	229th Assault Helicopter Battalion, 1st Cavalry Division	Battle of An Loc	South Vietnam, An Loc	Pilot of an AH-1G #69-15009 hit by ground fire	Presumptive finding of death
May 12	Bogard, Lonnie P	Captain	USAF	435th Tactical Fighter Squadron		Laos, Savannaket Province	Pilot of an F-4D which disappeared on a night reconnaissance mission over the Ban Karai Pass	Presumptive finding of death
May 12	Ostermeyer, William H	1st Lieutenant	USAF	435th Tactical Fighter Squadron		Laos, Savannaket Province	Weapons systems officer on an F-4D which disappeared on a night reconnaissance mission over the Ban Karai Pass	Presumptive finding of death
May 24	Henn, John R	Chief Warrant Officer	US Army	79th Aerial Rocket Artillery	Battle of An Loc	South Vietnam, An Loc	Copilot of an AH-1G #67-15836 hit by a SAM and broke in half at an altitude of 4,800 feet (1,500 m). The remains of the pilot W2 Isaac Y. Hosaka were recovered on 5 June	Presumptive finding of death
May 25	Strong, Henry H	Commander	US Navy	VA-212, USS Hancock		North Vietnam, Vinh	His A-4F #155045 was hit by anti-aircraft fire, no ejection or parachute observed	Presumptive finding of death
May 29	Morrow, Larry K	Specialist 4	US Army	Troop H, 17th Armored Cavalry Squadron		South Vietnam, Kon Tum Province	Gunner/observer on an OH-6A which was shot down, crashed and burned. The remains of the pilot W1 Gerald D. Spradlin were recovered on 30 June	Presumptive finding of death
June 5	Kraner, David S	Fireman	US Navy	USS Ashtabula		North Vietnam, Gulf of Tonkin	Lost overboard	Killed in action, body not recovered
June 5	Payne, Kylis T	Seaman	US Navy	USS Chipola		South Vietnam, South China Sea	Lost overboard	Killed in action, body not recovered
June 6	Fowler, James A	Major	USAF	523rd Tactical Fighter Squadron		North Vietnam, Yên Bái	Pilot of an F-4D #66-6232 hit by an SA-2 while on a MigCAP mission near Yên Bái Air Base, no ejection or parachutes observed	Presumptive finding of death
June 6	Seuell, John W	Captain	USAF	523rd Tactical Fighter Squadron		North Vietnam, Yên Bái	Weapons system officer on an F-4D #66-6232 hit by an SA-2 while on a MigCAP mission near Yên Bái Air Base, no ejection or parachutes observed	Presumptive finding of death
June 12	Wiley, Richard D	Specialist 4	US Army	Troop F, 8th Cavalry		South Vietnam, Thừa Thiên Province	Crewman on an OH-6A hit by enemy fire	Killed in action, body not recovered
June 14	Davis, Francis J	Lieutenant Commander	US Navy	VA-37, USS Saratoga		North Vietnam, Gulf of Tonkin	His A-7A #153206 crashed at sea	Presumptive finding of death
June 18	Kilpatrick, Larry R	Lieutenant	US Navy	VA-105, USS Saratoga		North Vietnam	His A-7A was lost while on a night attack mission	Presumptive finding of death until 18 May 2018 when he was accounted for
July 7	Robertson, Leonard	Captain	USMC	VMA-533	Easter Offensive	South Vietnam, Khe Sanh	Pilot of an A-6A hit by enemy fire and crashed into the ground, no ejection observed	Presumptive finding of death
July 12	O'Donnell, Samuel	Captain	USAF	433rd Tactical Fighter Squadron	Operation Linebacker	North Vietnam, Quảng Bình Province	Weapons systems officer on an F-4E which disappeared on an armed reconnaissance mission. The remains of the pilot 1st Lieutenant James L. Huard were identified in 1997	Presumptive finding of death
July 12	Shimkin, Alex	Civilian				South Vietnam, Quảng Trị Province	Journalist killed in a PAVN ambush	Missing
July 17	Brown, Wayne G	Captain	USAF	497th Tactical Fighter Squadron		South Vietnam, Thừa Thiên Province	Weapons systems officer on an F-4D	Presumptive finding of death
July 17	Haas, Leon F	Lieutenant	US Navy	VA-155, USS Oriskany	Operation Linebacker	North Vietnam, Gulf of Tonkin	His A-7B #154521 crashed at sea while on a night reconnaissance mission over Nghệ An Province	Killed in action, body not recovered
August 10	Sansone, James J	Seaman	US Navy	USS Newport News		North Vietnam, Gulf of Tonkin	Lost overboard	Killed in action, body not recovered
August 12	Thompson, David M	Lieutenant	US Navy	VF-24, USS Hancock		North Vietnam, Gulf of Tonkin	His F-8J crashed on final approach to the carrier at night	Killed in action, body not recovered
August 20	Lester, Roderick B	Lieutenant	US Navy	VA-52, USS Kitty Hawk	Operation Linebacker	North Vietnam, Quảng Ninh Province	Pilot of A-6A #157018 hit by anti-aircraft fire during a low-level night armed reconnaissance/strike mission. The remains of the bombardier/navigator Lt Harry S. Mossman were recovered in 2003	Presumptive finding of death
August 22	Crockett, Willian J	1st Lieutenant	USAF	421st Tactical Fighter Squadron	Second Battle of Quảng Trị	South Vietnam, Quảng Trị Province	Weapons systems officer on F-4E #68-0477 hit by ground fire on a close air support mission. The wing separated from the aircraft, which rolled inverted and crashed into the ground at a speed of 450 knots. No ejection observed	Killed in action, body not recovered
August 22	Tigner, Lee M	Major	USAF	421st Tactical Fighter Squadron	Second Battle of Quảng Trị	South Vietnam, Quảng Trị Province	Pilot of F-4E #68-0477 hit by ground fire on a close air support mission. The wing separated from the aircraft, which rolled inverted and crashed into the ground at a speed of 450 knots. No ejection observed	Killed in action, body not recovered
September 2	Greenwood, Robert R	Major	USAF	421st Tactical Fighter Squadron		Laos, Plain of Jars	Weapons systems officer on an F-4E #64-0335 hit by anti-aircraft fire and possibly collided with an O-1F #2799 forward air controller, two ejections and one parachute observed	Presumptive finding of death
September 2	Herold, Richard W	Captain	USAF	56th Special Operations Wing		Laos, Plain of Jars	Pilot of an O-1F #2799 forward air controller, which apparently collided with F-4E #64-0335	Killed in action, body not recovered
September 2	Wood, William C	Captain	USAF	421st Tactical Fighter Squadron		Laos, Plain of Jars	Pilot of an F-4E #64-0335 hit by anti-aircraft fire and possibly collided with an O-1F #2799 forward air controller, two ejections and one parachute observed	Presumptive finding of death
September 8	Gerstel, Donald A	Lieutenant Commander	US Navy	VA-93, USS Midway		North Vietnam, Gulf of Tonkin	His A-7B was hit by lightning and subsequently disappeared on a reconnaissance mission	Presumptive finding of death
September 17	Buell, Kenneth R	Lieutenant Commander	US Navy	VA-35, USS America	Operation Linebacker	North Vietnam, Hải Dương	Bombardier/navigator of an A-6A #157028 shot down on a bombing mission. The remains of the pilot CDR Verne G Donnelly were identified in 1991	Presumptive finding of death
September 17	Goetsch, Thomas A	Seaman Apprentice	US Navy	USS Kitty Hawk		North Vietnam, Gulf of Tonkin	Lost overboard	Killed in action, body not recovered
September 17	Turose, Michael S	1st Lieutenant	USAF	17th Wild Weasel Squadron	Operation Linebacker	North Vietnam, Gulf of Tonkin	Electronic warfare officer on an F-105G # 8360 was hit by an SA-2 and crashed at sea	Killed in action, body not recovered
September 17	Zorn, Thomas O	Captain	USAF	17th Wild Weasel Squadron	Operation Linebacker	North Vietnam, Gulf of Tonkin	Pilot of an F-105G # 8360 was hit by an SA-2 and crashed at sea	Killed in action, body not recovered
September 25	Chan, Peter	Seaman Apprentice	US Navy	USS Oriskany		North Vietnam, Gulf of Tonkin	Lost overboard	Killed in action, body not recovered
October 6	Boltze, Bruce E	Chief Warrant Officer	USMC	1st ANGLICO		South Vietnam, Da Nang	Observer on an OV-10 #67-14673 that was seen to explode in mid-air while directing naval gunfire	Killed in action, body not recovered
October 6	McCormick, Carl O	Lieutenant Colonel	USAF	20th Tactical Air Support Squadron		South Vietnam, Da Nang	Pilot of OV-10 #67-14673 that was seen to explode in mid-air while directing naval gunfire	Killed in action, body not recovered
October 12	Peacock, John R	Captain	USMC	VMA-533		North Vietnam, Quảng Bình Province	Pilot of an A-6A #155700 that disappeared on a bombing mission	Presumptive finding of death
October 12	Price, William M	1st Lieutenant	USMC	VMA-533		North Vietnam, Quảng Bình Province	Bombardier/navigator on an A-6A #155700 that disappeared on a bombing mission	Presumptive finding of death
October 24	Bixel, Michael S	Lieutenant (LTJG)	US Navy	VA-115, USS Midway		South Vietnam, Gulf of Tonkin	Bombardier/navigator on an A-6A that crashed on the deck of the USS Midway during a night landing, ejected but not recovered	Killed in action, body not recovered
November 7	Brown, Robert M	Major	USAF	430th Tactical Fighter Squadron		North Vietnam, Quảng Bình Province	Pilot of an F-111A that disappeared on a single aircraft night strike mission	Presumptive finding of death
November 7	Morrissey, Robert D	Major	USAF	430th Tactical Fighter Squadron		North Vietnam, Quảng Bình Province	Weapons systems officer on an F-111A that disappeared on a single aircraft night strike mission	Presumptive finding of death
November 20	Breuer, Donald C	Captain	USMC	VF-232		Laos, Savannakhet Province	Radar intercept officer of an F-4J hit by anti-aircraft fire, both crewmen ejected but only the pilot was rescued	Presumptive finding of death
November 21	Caffarelli, Charles J	Captain	USAF	430th Tactical Fighter Squadron		South Vietnam, South China Sea	Weapons systems officer on an F-111A #67-0092 that disappeared on a night strike mission. Aircraft wreckage washed up south of Huế in December	Killed in action, body not recovered
November 21	Stafford, Ronald D	Captain	USAF	430th Tactical Fighter Squadron		South Vietnam, South China Sea	Pilot of an F-111A #67-0092 that disappeared on a night strike mission. Aircraft wreckage washed up south of Huế in December	Killed in action, body not recovered
November 28	Earnest, Charles M	Commander	US Navy	VA-75, USS Saratoga		North Vietnam	Pilot of an A-6A Intruder #155622 that crashed following a night launch, the bombardier/navigator ejected successfully	Killed in action, body not recovered
November 28	Harvey, Jack R	Captain	USAF	421st Tactical Fighter Squadron		South Vietnam, Thừa Thiên Province	Pilot of an F-4D that crashed on a non-combat flight from Udorn, Thailand to Da Nang	Presumptive finding of death
November 28	Jones, Bobby M	Captain	USAF	432nd Tactical Reconnaissance Squadron		South Vietnam, Thừa Thiên Province	Flight surgeon passenger on an F-4D that crashed on a non-combat flight from Udorn, Thailand to Da Nang	Presumptive finding of death
December 18	McElvain, James R	Major	USAF	430th Tactical Fighter Squadron	Operation Linebacker II	North Vietnam, Gulf of Tonkin	Weapons systems officer on an F-111A #67-099 that disappeared on a single aircraft strike mission	Presumptive finding of death
December 18	Ward, Ronald J	Lieutenant Colonel	USAF	430th Tactical Fighter Squadron	Operation Linebacker II	North Vietnam, Gulf of Tonkin	Pilot of an F-111A #67-099 that disappeared on a single aircraft strike mission	Presumptive finding of death
December 20	McLaughlin, Arthur V	Chief Master Sergeant	USAF	348th Bombardment Squadron	Operation Linebacker II	North Vietnam, Hanoi	Gunner on a B-52D #56-0622 hit by an SA-2, 2 crewmen ejected and were captured, the remains of two other crewmen were returned in 2003 and 2004	Presumptive finding of death
December 20	Stuart, John F	Major	USAF	348th Bombardment Squadron	Operation Linebacker II	North Vietnam, Hanoi	Pilot of a B-52D #56-0622 hit by an SA-2, 2 crewmen ejected and were captured, the remains of two other crewmen were returned in 2003 and 2004	Presumptive finding of death
December 21	Gould, Frank A	Major	USAF	2nd Bombardment Squadron	Operation Linebacker II	Laos	Radar-navigator on a B-52D hit by an SA-2 over Hanoi, all other crewmen ejected successfully	Presumptive finding of death
December 22	Bennett, Thomas W	Captain	USAF	22nd Bombardment Wing	Operation Linebacker II	North Vietnam	Co-pilot of a B-52D #55-0061 hit by an SA-2, three crewmen ejected successfully and were captured, while the remains of the other two crewmen were returned in 1989	Presumptive finding of death
December 24	Jackson, Paul V	Captain	USAF	56th Special Operations Wing		Laos, Plain of Jars	Pilot of an O-1 FAC that collided with an A-7D during a close air support mission, the O-1 crash-landed and he was seen to be dead	Killed in action, body not recovered
December 25	Rickman, Dwight G	1st Lieutenant	USMC	1st ANGLICO		South Vietnam, Quảng Trị Province	Pilot of an O-1 shot down east of Dong Ha	Presumptive finding of death
December 27	Chipman, Ralph J	Captain	USMC	VMA-533	Operation Linebacker II	North Vietnam	Pilot of A-6A #155666	Presumptive finding of death until August 2023 when he was accounted for
December 27	Forrester, Ronald W	1st Lieutenant	USMC	VMA-533	Operation Linebacker II	North Vietnam	Bombardier/navigator on A-6A #155666	Presumptive finding of death until December 2023 when he was accounted for

== 1973 ==
Date missing	Surname, First name(s)	Rank	Service	Unit	Operation/Battle Name	Location	Circumstances of loss	Recovery status
January 3	Scaife, Kenneth D	Seaman apprentice	US Navy	USS William C. Lawe		South Vietnam	Lost at sea	Killed in action, body not recovered
January 4	Johnston, Steven B	Lieutenant	USAF	497th Tactical Fighter Squadron		Laos	Weapon Systems Officer in an F-4D struck by ground fire, both crewmen ejected and he was seen to be dead on the ground	Killed in action, body not recovered
January 6	Lindahl, John C	Lieutenant	US Navy	VA-56, USS Midway		Gulf of Tonkin	Drowned after his A-7B ditched in the sea immediately after launch	Killed in action, body not recovered
January 21	Christopherson, Keith A	Lieutenant junior grade	US Navy	VAQ-130, USS Ranger		Gulf of Tonkin, east of Vinh	Killed when his EKA-3B Skywarrior (Bureau number 142634) ditched in the sea immediately after a night launch	Killed in action, body not recovered
January 21	Parker, Charles L	Lieutenant commander	US Navy	VAQ-130, USS Ranger		Gulf of Tonkin, east of Vinh	Killed when his EKA-3B Skywarrior (Bureau number 142634) ditched in the sea immediately after a night launch	Killed in action, body not recovered
January 21	Wiehr, Richard D	Petty officer second class	US Navy	VAQ-130, USS Ranger		Gulf of Tonkin, east of Vinh	Killed when his EKA-3B Skywarrior (Bureau number 142634) ditched in the sea immediately after a night launch	Killed in action, body not recovered
January 27	Morris, George W	Lieutenant	USAF	23rd Tactical Air Support Squadron		South Vietnam, Quảng Trị Province	OV-10A Bronco (Tail number 68-3806 call sign Nail 89) was hit by an SA-7 missile, both crewmen ejected, two parachutes were sighted and initial voice contact was made with one crewmember	Presumptive finding of death
January 27	Peterson, Mark A	Lieutenant	USAF	23rd Tactical Air Support Squadron		South Vietnam, Quảng Trị Province	OV-10A Bronco (Tail number 68-3806 call sign Nail 89) was hit by an SA-7 missile, both crewmen ejected, two parachutes were sighted and initial voice contact was made with one crewmember	Presumptive finding of death
January 30	Duensing, James A	Lieutenant	US Navy	VF-21		Gulf of Tonkin	Killed in collision of his F-4J Phantom II (Bureau number 158361) with another F-4J Phantom II (Bureau number 158366) of VF-21	Killed in action, body not recovered
January 30	Haviland, Roy E	Lieutenant junior grade	US Navy	VF-21		Gulf of Tonkin	Killed in collision of his F-4J Phantom II (Bureau number 158361) with another F-4J Phantom II (Bureau number 158366) of VF-21	Killed in action, body not recovered
February 3	Stringham, William S	Aviation machinist third class	US Navy	VAW-115, USS Midway		South Vietnam	Lost at sea	Killed in action, body not recovered
June 14	McLeod, David V	Master sergeant	USAF	40th Aerospace Rescue and Recovery Squadron		Cambodia Tonlé Sap	Jolly Green 64, HH-53C Sea Stallion (Tail number 66-10362) lost its tail rotor and crashed into the Tonlé Sap	Killed in action, body not recovered
June 16	Cornelius, Samuel B	Captain	USAF	336th Tactical Fighter Squadron		Cambodia	Killed when his F-4E Phantom II (Tail number 67-00374; call sign "Wolf 07") was hit by ground fire and crashed. No parachutes were seen, and no emergency beeper signals were heard indicating that the crew ejected safely.	Presumptive finding of death
June 16	Smallwood, John J	Lieutenant	USAF	58th Tactical Fighter Squadron (on temporary duty with the 336th TFS)		Cambodia	Killed when his F-4E Phantom II (Tail number 67-00374; call sign "Wolf 07") was hit by ground fire and crashed. No parachutes were seen, and no emergency beeper signals were heard indicating that the crew ejected safely.	Presumptive finding of death

== 1975 ==
Date missing	Surname, First name(s)	Rank	Service	Unit	Operation/Battle Name	Location	Circumstances of loss	Recovery status
March 12	Dolan, Edward V	Civilian				South Vietnam, Pleiku	Air Vietnam Douglas DC-4 XV-NUJ crash.	Killed in action, body not recovered
March 12	Miller, George C	Civilian	USAID			South Vietnam, Pleiku	Air Vietnam Douglas DC-4 XV-NUJ crash	Killed in action, body not recovered
March 12	Seidl, Robert	Civilian				South Vietnam, Pleiku	Air Vietnam Douglas DC-4 XV-NUJ crash	Killed in action, body not recovered
April 25	Walsh, Brian	Civilian				Cambodia		Missing
April 29	Nystul, William C	Lieutenant	US Navy	HMM-164	Operation Frequent Wind	South Vietnam	CH-46F Swift 1–4 crashed into the sea on its approach to the USS Hancock during a night sea and air rescue mission	Killed in action, body not recovered
April 29	Shea, Michael J	Lieutenant junior grade	US Navy	HMM-164	Operation Frequent Wind	South Vietnam	CH-46F Swift 1–4 crashed into the sea on its approach to the USS Hancock during a night sea and air rescue mission	Killed in action, body not recovered
May 15	Benedett, Daniel A	Private first class	USMC	2nd Battalion, 9th Marines	Mayaguez incident	Cambodia, Koh Tang	Killed in the crash of Knife 31	Listed as killed in action, body not recovered until January 2013 when his remains were identified
May 15	Hall, Gary L	Private first class	USMC	2nd Battalion, 9th Marines	Mayaguez incident	Cambodia, Koh Tang	Left on Koh Tang during evacuation. Executed by the Khmer Rouge in late May	Presumptive finding of death
May 15	Hargrove, Joseph N	Lance corporal	USMC	2nd Battalion, 9th Marines	Mayaguez incident	Cambodia, Koh Tang	Left on Koh Tang during evacuation. Executed by the Khmer Rouge on 16 May	Presumptive finding of death
May 15	Jacques, James J	Private first class	USMC	2nd Battalion, 9th Marines	Mayaguez incident	Cambodia, Koh Tang	Killed in the crash of Knife 31	Listed as killed in action, body not recovered, until 1 September 2012 when his remains were identified
May 15	Loney, Ashton N	Lance corporal	USMC	2nd Battalion, 9th Marines	Mayaguez incident	Cambodia, Koh Tang	KIA, body left on Koh Tang during evacuation	Killed in action, body not recovered
May 15	Marshall, Danny G	Private first class	USMC	2nd Battalion, 9th Marines	Mayaguez incident	Cambodia, Koh Tang	Left on Koh Tang during evacuation Executed by the Khmer Rouge in late May	Presumptive finding of death
May 15	Maxwell, James R	Private first class	USMC	2nd Battalion, 9th Marines	Mayaguez incident	Cambodia, Koh Tang	Killed in the crash of Knife 31	Listed as killed in action, body not recovered, until 9 July 2012 when his remains were identified
May 15	Rivenburgh, Richard W	Private first class	USMC	2nd Battalion, 9th Marines	Mayaguez incident	Cambodia, Koh Tang	Killed in the crash of Knife 31	Listed as killed in action, body not recovered, until 25 June 2012 when his remains were identified
May 15	Rumbaugh, Elwood E	Staff sergeant	USAF	21st Special Operations Squadron	Mayaguez incident	Cambodia, Koh Tang	Missing presumed drowned in the crash of Knife 21	Killed in action, body not recovered

== See also ==
- List of United States servicemembers and civilians missing in action during the Vietnam War (1961–65)
- List of United States servicemembers and civilians missing in action during the Vietnam War (1966–67)
- List of United States servicemembers and civilians missing in action during the Vietnam War (1968–69)
- List of United States servicemembers and civilians missing in action during the Vietnam War (1970–71)
- Vietnam War POW/MIA issue
- Joint POW/MIA Accounting Command
- Defense Prisoner of War/Missing Personnel Office
- Defense POW/MIA Accounting Agency
