= Baron 52 =

US Air Force plane shot down in Laos

Coordinates: 15.3755°N 106.5958°E

- Part of Laotian Civil War
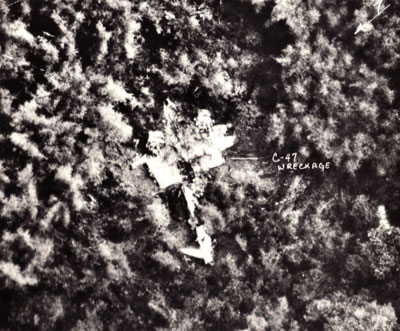
- Aerial reconnaissance photo of the Baron 52 crash site in Salavan Province, Laos, 1973. The fuselage lies upside down and both wings were severed
Date	5 February 1973
Location	50 miles (80 km) east of the city of Salavan, Laos
Result	One aircraft shot down

Belligerents
North Vietnam	United States

Strength
	1 EC-47

Casualties and losses
none	1 EC-47 destroyed 8 killed

Baron 52 was the call sign of a United States Air Force EC-47 carrying eight crew members that was shot down over Laos during the predawn hours of 5 February 1973, a week after the Paris Peace Accords officially ended the United States involvement in the Vietnam War. The remains of four crewmen were recovered from the crash site, but those of the remaining four have never been found. Although the U.S. government considers them to have been killed in action and as late as 1996 listed them as "accounted for", family members and POW/MIA advocates believe the four survived the crash and were taken captive and possibly sent to the USSR. The intelligence gatherers and their equipment would have been highly valued by the Soviets who maintained a presence both in Laos and North Vietnam. The incident has been featured on several nationwide news programs and a 1991 episode of the U.S. television series Unsolved Mysteries.

== The mission ==
Although the Paris Peace Accords had officially ended the United States' direct role in the Vietnam War, only a week after its signing the U.S. Air Force sent an EC-47Q electronic warfare collection aircraft on a night-time radio-direction-finding mission to monitor the Ho Chi Minh trail and locate North Vietnamese tanks moving south. The plane, tail number 43-48636, belonged to the 361st Tactical Electronic Warfare Squadron and began its mission from Ubon Royal Thai Air Force Base. The flight crew also were part of the 361st while the collection crew manning the rear of the plane were from Detachment 3, 6994th Security Squadron. Over Laos, the plane began taking anti-aircraft fire and went down in Salavan Province, Laos about 50 miles (80 km) east of the city of Salavan and 20 miles (32 km) from the border with South Vietnam at a site in the jungle within 8 miles (13 km) of three major roads leading into North Vietnamese-held territory. (15°37'55.0"N 106°59'58.0"E)

== Crew ==
361st Tactical Electronic Warfare Squadron:

- Capt. George R. Spitz – Pilot
- 1st Lt. Severo J. Primm III – Co-Pilot
- Capt. Arthur R. Bollinger – Navigator
- 1st Lt. Robert E. Bernhardt – 3rd Pilot

6994th Security Squadron:

- SSgt. Todd M. Melton – Radio Operator
- Sgt. Joseph A. Matejov – Radio Operator
- Sgt. Peter R. Cressman – Radio Operator
- Sgt. Dale Brandenburg – Systems Repair Technician

== Recovery efforts ==
The location of the wreckage was first discovered by U.S. Air Force search and rescue on 7 February 1973. The plane was determined to have crashed inverted, coming to rest upside down in the jungle; both wings had been sheared off. A team consisting of three pararescuemen and an intelligence expert were on the ground for approximately an hour and found three bodies in the charred wreckage, those of Spitz, Primm and Bollinger in the cockpit, still strapped in their seats. Outside of the wreckage, they found Lt. Bernhardt's body. In the rear of the plane they observed that the jump door had been removed (it was never located), the crew's safety belts were unbuckled, and all of the top secret sensitive equipment was missing as were the rear crew's parachutes.

On 9 February 1973, Bernhardt's remains were recovered and positively identified four days later. On 22 February, the other four men were declared killed in action despite no confirmation of their fates.

== Controversy ==
The families of the missing crew members believe there is evidence they bailed out and were taken captive by the People's Army of Vietnam (PAVN). They point to information in official reports, such as the fact that their safety belts were unbuckled and their remains were not at the crash site, to support their beliefs that the rear crew had time to bail out. In addition, at approximately 8:00 AM on 5 February, U.S. Intelligence listening post at Phu Bai Combat Base in South Vietnam intercepted PAVN communications from the area indicating they were transporting four captured Airmen. Such communications continued to be intercepted for the next three months. Also on record is a Pathet Lao radio intercept regarding four "air pirates" captured the day Baron 52 was shot down; no other U.S. aircraft was downed that day. A Laotian operative secretly working for the U.S. reported observing the transport of four prisoners along the road near the crash site. All of these records remained classified by the U.S. government. This evidence was first presented to the American public by columnist Jack Anderson on the U.S. news program Good Morning America in 1978. During Anderson's report, he stated a "Pentagon spokesman now agrees there's a good chance these four men were survivors of the crash. Yet, the Pentagon deliberately gave the families misinformation".

In 1992, in front of the Senate Select Committee on POW/MIA Affairs, a representative of the Defense Intelligence Agency testified that it was the government's position that these reports were unrelated to Baron 52; this testimony was repeated in 1994 before the House Subcommittee on Asia and the Pacific of the Committee on Foreign Affairs. In November 1992, the Lao government allowed a team to survey the crash site where a dogtag with Sgt. Matejov's name on it was found, after nearly 20 years, lying in plain sight. Also recovered were 23 bone fragments and half of a tooth which were taken to the Central Identification Laboratory in Hawaii, where Ellis R. Kerley publicly stated that the bone fragments "can not be proven conclusively to be human." According to further testimony given before the House Subcommittee by Albert Santoli, Kerley was replaced by "a U.S. Army Lt. Colonel, professionally a dentist, who has limited forensic experience", and the bone fragments were declared to be the remains of all four of the remaining crew members. The families requested DNA analysis be done on the bone fragments and tooth, but their requests were denied by the government.

On 27 March 1996, the bone fragments were interred at Arlington National Cemetery in a group burial. The families of all eight men attended although the families of the four rear crew members were there to "honor the sacrifice" of the flight crew and did not believe the bone fragments were those of Melton, Matejov, Cressman or Brandenburg. Matejov's younger brother, John Matejov, has sought help from both Wyoming Senators and Congressmen in petitioning the Pentagon for further information as well as appealing directly to President Obama. Former Deputy Assistant Secretary of Defense Roger Shields said the government "acted 'precipitously' to declare Matejov and the other three missing crew members to be dead". In their book, The Men We Left Behind, Mark Sauter and Jim Sanders wrote that "The names were scratched from the list (of MIAs) because they were an inconvenience that would have complicated Henry Kissinger's life". Kissinger negotiated the Paris Peace Accords and was responsible for carrying out President Nixon's promise to bring all POWs home. They further alleged that "the men weren't dead, and the Pentagon knew it" and that it was covered up because the flight was illegal under the Paris agreement.

Congress reviewed the status of the four crewmen in 2016. The status of one of the four crewman was not changed to MIA in 2016. As of September 2020 the entire crew is listed by the Defense POW/MIA Accounting Agency as accounted for.
