= Joint POW/MIA Accounting Command =

United States defense task force

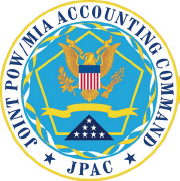

The Joint POW/MIA Accounting Command (often referred to as JPAC) was a joint task force within the United States Department of Defense (DoD) whose mission was to account for Americans who are listed as prisoners of war (POWs), or missing in action (MIA), from all past wars and conflicts. It was especially visible in conjunction with the Vietnam War POW/MIA issue. The mission of the Joint POW/MIA Accounting Command was to achieve the fullest possible accounting of all Americans missing as a result of the nation's past conflicts. The motto of JPAC was "Until they are home".

On 30 January 2015, JPAC was officially deactivated by the Department of Defense. The Defense Department's efforts at reform followed a series of embarrassing scandals and damning revelations in reports and testimony before Congress starting in 2013 concerning failures in the effort to identify missing war dead. JPAC, the Defense POW/Missing Personnel Office (DPMO), and certain functions of the U.S. Air Force's Life Sciences Equipment Laboratory, were all merged into the new Defense POW/MIA Accounting Agency.

== Structure ==
JPAC was a standing direct reporting unit within the United States Pacific Command. Its headquarters were located at Joint Base Pearl Harbor–Hickam in Hawaii.

JPAC maintained three permanent overseas detachments, two local detachments, the Annex, Offutt Air Force Base, Nebraska, and the European Liaison Office located on Miesau Army Depot, Germany; all devoted to the ongoing tasks of POW/MIA accounting. Each detachment was under the command of a field grade officer of the United States armed forces.

- Detachment 1 – Bangkok, Thailand (American Embassy in Thailand)
- Detachment 2 – Hanoi, Vietnam
- Detachment 3 – Vientiane, Laos
- Investigation and Recovery Group – Joint Base Pearl Harbor–Hickam, Oahu, Hawaii; this group was the home base of the recovery teams when they were not deployed
- HQ – Pentagon, Arlington, Virginia.
- JPAC Annex – Offutt Air Force Base, Nebraska; the JCA performed routine anthropological and odontological analysis in order to identify unaccounted-for service members.
- European Liaison Office – Miesau Army Depot, Germany; helped facilitate the planning, execution, logistical and administrative support for all JPAC operations in the European Command area of responsibility.
- The laboratory portion of JPAC referred to as the Central Identification Laboratory (CIL).

== History ==
- 1973: The DOD established the Central Identification Laboratory–Thailand to coordinate POW/MIA recovery efforts in Southeast Asia.
- 1976: The DOD established the Central Identification Laboratory–Hawaii to search for, recover, and identify missing Americans from all previous conflicts.
- 1992: The Joint Task Force–Full Accounting (JTF-FA) was established to focus on achieving the fullest possible accounting of American missing from the Vietnam War.
- 2002: DOD determined that POW/MIA recovery efforts would be best served by combining the two Central Identification Laboratories and the Joint Task Force.
- 1 October 2003: The Joint POW/MIA Accounting command was established under the auspices of the Commander, Pacific Command (CDRUSPACOM).

== Operations ==
JPAC's operations were divided into four areas: Analysis and Investigation, Recovery, Identification, and Closure.

=== Analysis and investigation ===
JPAC investigated leads concerning Americans who were killed in action but were never brought home. This process involved close coordination with other U.S. agencies involved in the POW/MIA issue. JPAC carried out technical negotiations and talks with representatives of foreign governments around the world in order to ensure positive in-country conditions were maintained or created for JPAC investigative and recovery operations wherever JPAC teams deployed in the world. If enough evidence was found, a site was recommended for recovery.

=== Recovery ===
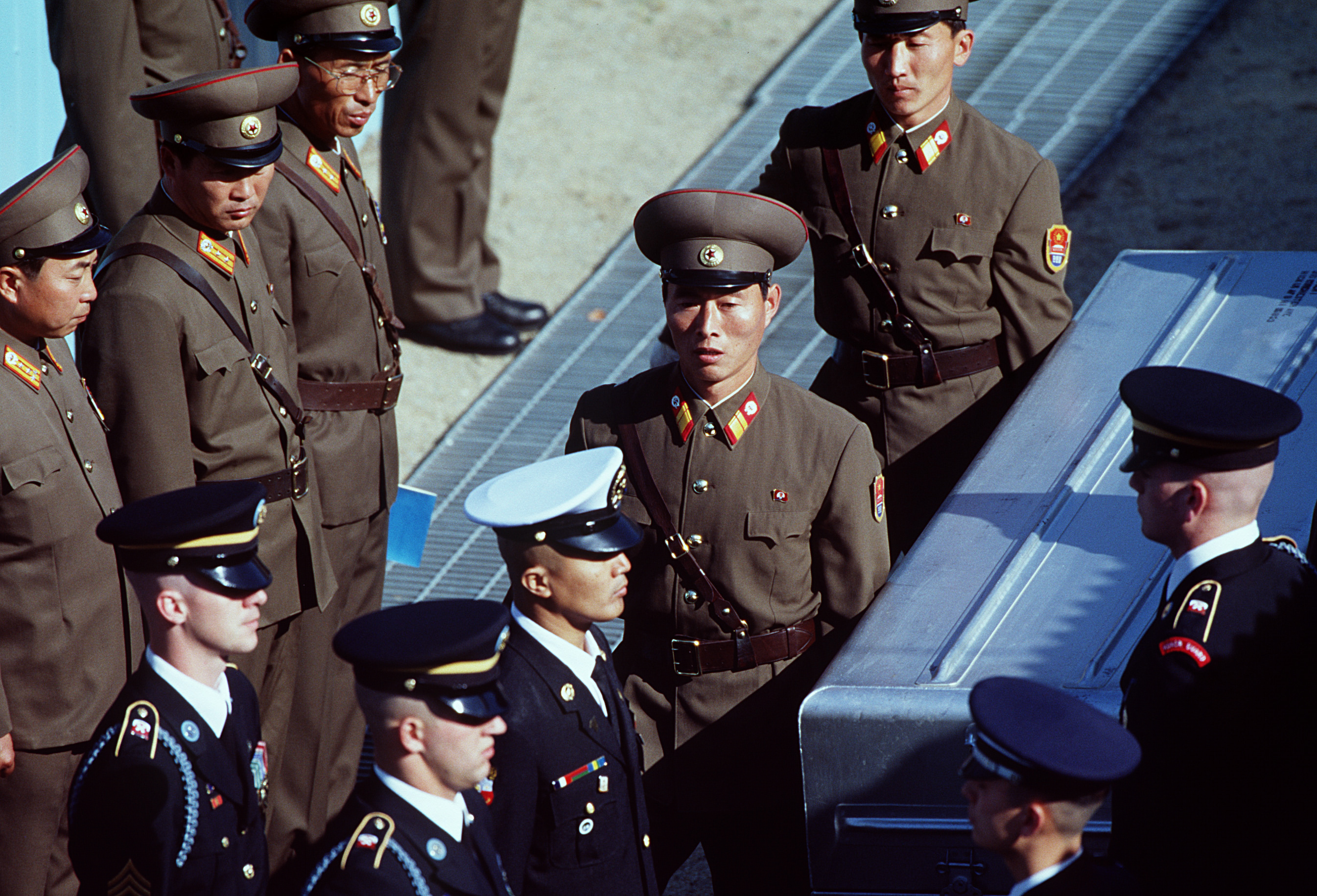
United Nations Command (UNC) honor guard members receive remains from Korean People's Army soldiers at the Joint Security Area Nov 6,1998

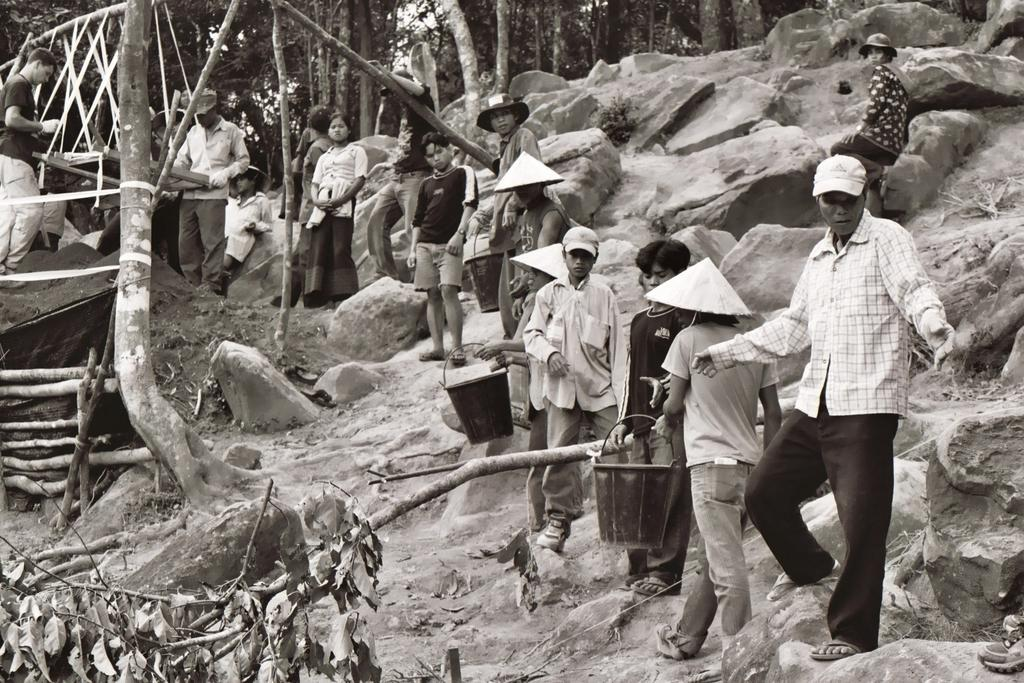
Laotians hired to assist U.S. troops sift then move tons of dirt on a mountain near Xepon, Laos (July 2004). This particular mission involved searching for the human remains of two F-4 Phantom crewmen who crashed after a bombing run over Vietnam.

JPAC had 18 Recovery Teams whose members traveled throughout the world to recover missing from past wars. A typical recovery team was made up of 10 to 14 people, led by a team leader and a forensic anthropologist. Other members of the team typically included a team sergeant, linguist, medic, life support technician, forensic photographer, RF systems communications technician/operator and an explosive ordnance disposal technician. Additional experts were added to the mission as needed, such as mountaineering specialists or divers.

The team carefully excavates the site and screens the soil to locate all possible remains and artifacts. In the case of an airplane crash, a recovery site may be quite large.

Once the recovery effort was completed, the team returned to Hawaii. All remains and artifacts found during the recovery operation were then transported from a U.S. military plane or private airline to JPAC's Central Identification Laboratory where identification took an average of 18 months; often cited statistics of 11 years include materials that were severely commingled (intentionally) from turnovers from the Korean People's Army in the mid-1990s. These materials only recently began to be identified used several different DNA techniques.

=== Identification ===
Upon arrival at the laboratory, all remains and artifacts recovered from a site were signed over to the custody of the CIL and stored in a secure area. Forensic anthropologists carefully analyze all remains and artifacts to determine the sex, race, age at death, and stature of the individual. Anthropologists also analyzed trauma caused at or near the time of death and pathological conditions of bone such as arthritis or previous healed breaks. Lab scientists used a variety of techniques to establish the identification of missing Americans, including analysis of skeletal and dental remains, sampling mitochondrial DNA (mtDNA), and analyzing material evidence, personal effects, aviation life-support equipment (gear used by aircrew: helmets, oxygen masks, harnesses, etc.), or other military equipment.

Often, recovered military and personal equipment artifacts were forwarded to the USAF Life Sciences Equipment Laboratory (LSEL, located at Wright-Patterson Air Force Base, in Dayton, OH), for scientific and historical analysis. The LSEL was qualified to scientifically study recovered military equipment artifacts and determine forensic aspects, to include, but not limited to: number of unaccounted for personnel represented at the loss site (i.e. 2 aviators), branch of military service represented (i.e. Navy), vehicle type represented (i.e. F-4 aircraft type), time frame represented (i.e. c. 1967), and represented levels of non-survivability or survivability (i.e. any evidence of fatal/non-fatal status). Frequently, the LSEL was able to provide case determinations (through analysis of recovered equipment artifacts) when other evidence (such as human remains: bone or teeth) was not recovered or available, and/or does not yield any substantial conclusions through testing (i.e. DNA testing).

=== Closure ===
The recovery and identification process may take years to complete. The average identification time by the JPAC CIL was 18 months, excluding a vast amount of commingled remains turned over by North Korea, after remains arrived in the laboratory. In addition to the factors previously mentioned, each separate line of evidence was examined at the CIL (bones, teeth, and material evidence) and correlated with all historical evidence. All reports underwent a thorough peer review process that included an external review by independent experts. Additionally, if mtDNA was part of the process, the search for family reference samples for mtDNA comparison added a significant amount of time to the identification process because building a DNA database was not the purview of JPAC. Completed cases were forwarded to the appropriate service Mortuary Affairs office, whose members personally notified next-of-kin family members.

== Ongoing efforts ==
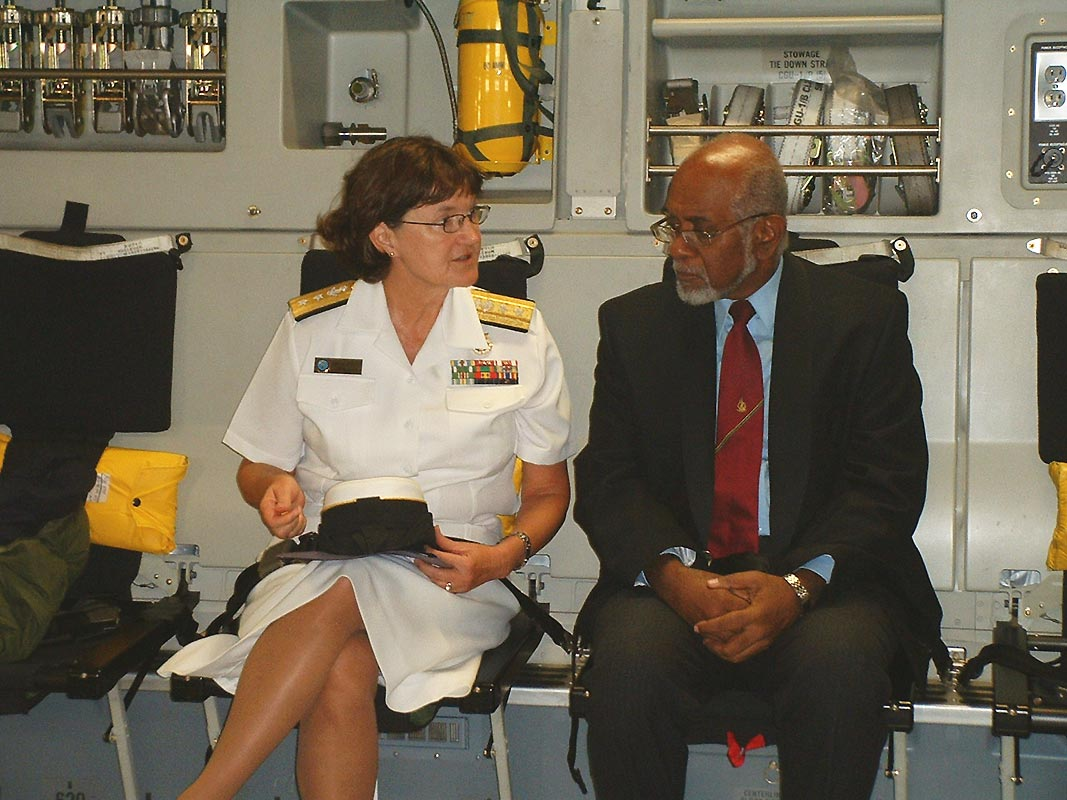
Navy Rear Adm. Donna Crisp, commander, Joint POW/MIA Accounting Command, talks with Vanuatu President Kalkot Mataskelekele at a repatriation ceremony in 2009.

JPAC conducted a number of missions each year in its ongoing efforts. The missions per year for individuals missing for each war:

- Korean War: 5 missions
- Vietnam War (including Southeast Asia): 10 missions
- World War II and the Cold War: 10 missions

In 2007 a JPAC team led by Maj. Sean Stinchon visited Iō-tō (formerly Iwo Jima) to hunt for the remains of Marine Sergeant Bill Genaust. He was the Marine combat photographer (motion picture cameraman) who was standing next to Joe Rosenthal, who filmed the Raising the Flag on Iwo Jima during the World War II invasion of the island. The team identified two possible cave entrances that may contain Genaust's remains. The JPAC team hopes to return and properly search the tunnels to possibly locate the remains of Sergeant Genaust, and those of other unaccounted for Marines.

== 2013 evaluation, reports, and investigations into JPAC ==
An internal JPAC report, obtained by the Associated Press in July 2013, cited JPAC's management as being inept, mismanaged, and wasteful, to the extent that it could worsen from "dysfunction to total failure". In the Associated Press story's words, the report says "the decades-old pursuit of bones and other MIA evidence is sluggish, often duplicative and subjected to too little scientific rigor". The report notes that the JPAC Command is "woefully inept and even corrupt". The report notes that in recent years the process by which the JPAC Laboratory field recovery teams gathers bones and other material useful for identifications has "collapsed" and is now "acutely dysfunctional." The report concludes that absent prompt and significant change, "the descent from dysfunction to total failure … is inevitable." It accused the Command of maintaining inadequate databases of missing personnel, relying on unreliable maps, wasting money on unnecessary and useless travel and drastically failing to achieve targets set by the U.S. Congress. It said the organization paid out hundreds of thousands of dollars to North Korea to "recover" the remains of fallen U.S. servicemen whose bodies had been planted on former battlefields, and even used as laboratory skeletons. In the report it was stated that the average length of time for the JPAC laboratory to identify casualties increased from slightly over 4 years in 2005 to 11 years in 2011 for each set of remains that are recovered.

A contrary viewpoint, expressed by author Wil S. Hylton, holds that while the command has suffered from bureaucratic tendencies, "it is flat-out wrong to dismiss the work of JPAC as a failure. For every instance in which the unit moves more slowly than it could, there are many cases where JPAC field teams have delivered answers to a family that would otherwise be lost forever."

NBC News also revealed during 2013 that, for years, the U.S. government has been fabricating phony "arrival ceremonies" during which the honored dead soldiers from the former battlefields were seemingly transported to their homeland by a cargo plane, but were actually not in existence at all. In addition, being towed into adequate positions, the planes used in the ceremonies often could not fly. This was confirmed by both the Department of Defense and the JPAC team with the explanations that "part of the ceremony involves symbolically transferring the recovered remains from an aircraft" and "static aircraft are used for the ceremonies".

Multiple government investigations into JPAC were initiated in 2013, including ongoing Congressional hearings in both the House and Senate.

The POW/MIA effort by JPAC and a handful of agencies around the country, was fragmented, overlapped and hampered by inter-agency disputes, a July 2013 Government Accountability Office report said. In February 2014, Secretary of Defense Chuck Hagel directed the merging of JPAC and the Defense POW/Missing Personnel Office (DPMO), as well as certain functions of the U.S. Air Force's Life Sciences Equipment Laboratory, into a single, more accountable agency. In October 2014, a report by the DoD inspector general said poor leadership and a hostile work environment at JPAC could continue to plague the mission. The last commander of JPAC, Major General Kelly McKeague, was demoted to deputy commander and replaced by Rear Admiral Mike Franken. The JPAC Scientific Director, Thomas Holland, was replaced by Captain Edward Reedy.

On 30 January 2015, the merger into the new Defense POW/MIA Accounting Agency became official, and JPAC ceased to be.

== Still missing ==
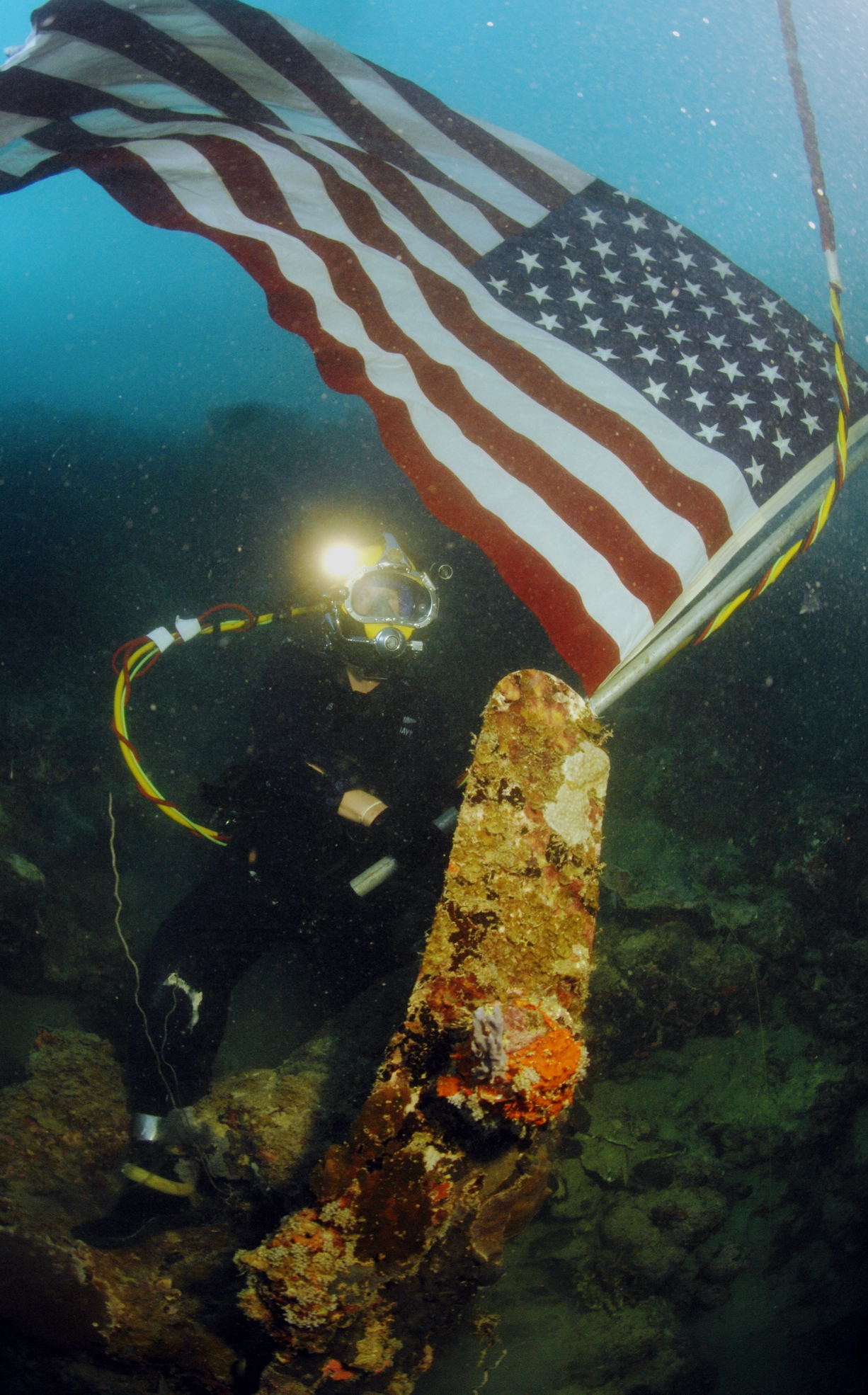
U.S. Navy divers working with JPAC plant an American flag on the site of a crashed WWII aircraft in the South Pacific

As of 9 July 2021:

- World War II: 72,462
- Korean War: 7,557
- Vietnam War: 1,584
- Cold War: 126

These figures have been reported by JPAC and DPAA for nearly 20 years. The figures for WWII are unsupported by anything except declaration. Department of War casualty records available from the Library of Congress and the National Archives do not show this number. Further, until the creation of DPAA, records for WWI were included in Unaccounted For Missing personnel - they no longer are.

- Operation El Dorado Canyon (Libyan bombing of 1986): 1 - Captain Paul F. Lorence, U.S. Air Force, Killed-in-action/Body-not-recovered
- Operation Desert Storm (Gulf War): 2 - Lt. Cmdr. Barry T. Cooke, U.S. Navy and Lt. Robert J. Dwyer, U.S. Navy, both Killed-in-action/Body-not-recovered
- Operation Iraqi Freedom (Iraq War): 3 - DoD Contractors Kirk von Ackermann, Timothy E. Bell and Adnan al-Hilawi

== See also ==
- Baron 52
- Joint Personnel Recovery Center
- Defense POW/MIA Accounting Agency
- Defense Prisoner of War/Missing Personnel Office
- Vietnam War POW/MIA issue
- National League of Families
- List of United States servicemembers and civilians missing in action during the Vietnam War (1961–65)
- List of United States servicemembers and civilians missing in action during the Vietnam War (1966–67)
- List of United States servicemembers and civilians missing in action during the Vietnam War (1968–69)
- List of United States servicemembers and civilians missing in action during the Vietnam War (1970–71)
- List of United States servicemembers and civilians missing in action during the Vietnam War (1972–75)

== Sources ==
- Joint POW/MIA Accounting Command (DPAA)
- Snyder, Rachel Louise (February–March 2005). "MIA: A search begun in a Washington, D.C., boardinghouse 140 years ago continues today as a $100-million-a-year effort to reunite the U.S. military and American families with their missing soldiers". American Heritage. 56 (1).
- Mather, Paul D. (1994). M.I.A.: accounting for the missing in Southeast Asia. National Defense University Press. ISBN 9780160363917. Dewey Decimal 959.70431, LCC DS559.8.
