= Recovery of U.S. human remains from the Korean War =

Aspect of Korean War history

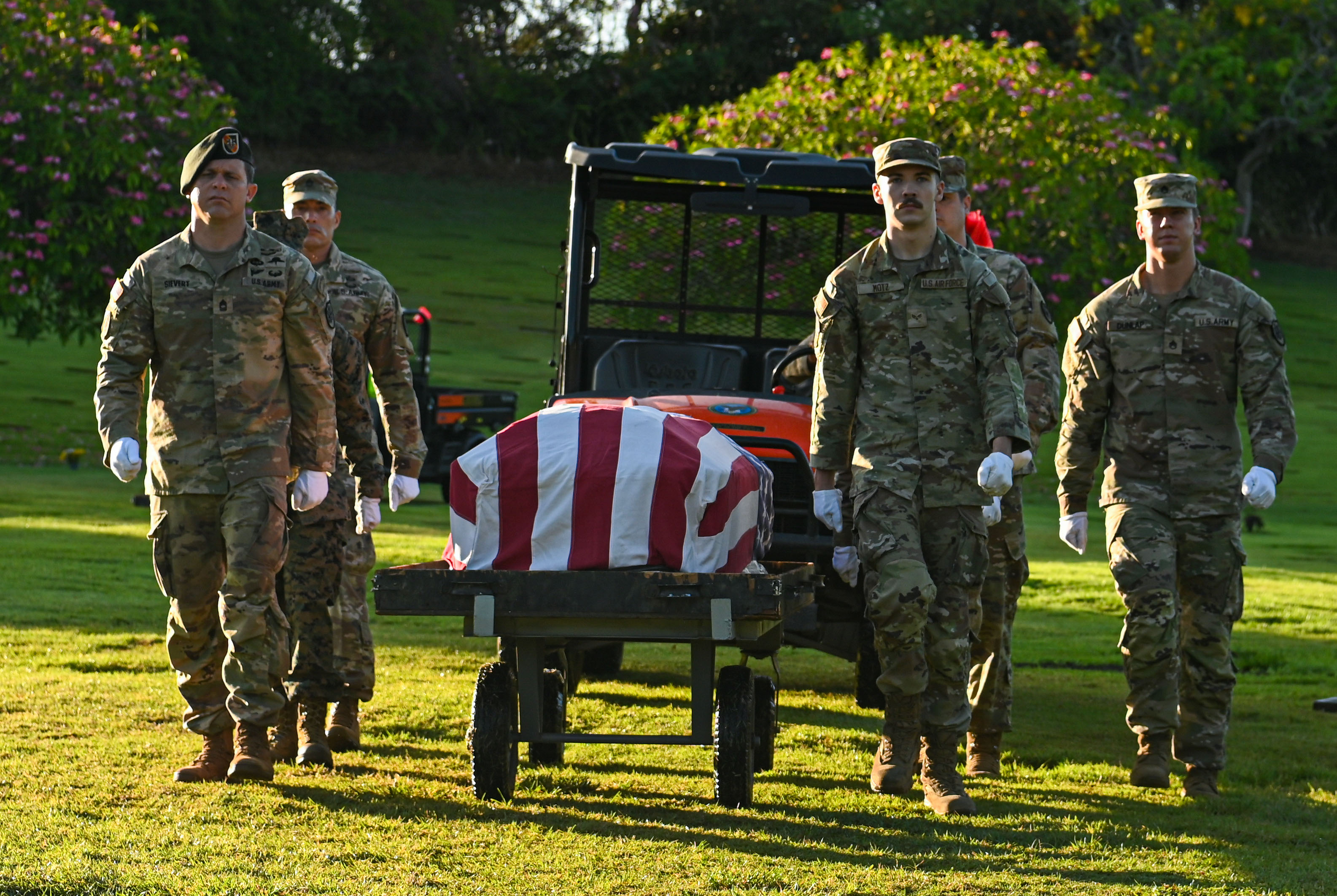
U.S. service members assigned to the Defense POW/MIA Accounting Agency escort a transfer case during a disinterment ceremony at the National Memorial Cemetery of the Pacific on August 11, 2025. During the ceremony, eight caskets from the Korean War were transferred to the DPAA laboratory on Joint Base Pearl Harbor–Hickam, Hawaii, for further scientific analysis and possible identification. In 2019, the DPAA began disinterring 652 sets of unknown remains associated with the Korean War that had been buried at the Punchbowl. These remains were recovered from the Republic of Korea (South Korea) and Democratic Republic of Korea (North Korea) in the 1950s and 1960s, and were buried as unknowns when they could not be identified by the traditional forensic processes available at the time.

The recovery of US human remains from the Korean War has continued since the end of the war with the signing of the armistice agreement.

More than 36,000 American troops died during the Korean War (1950–1953).

As of 2024, the Defense POW/MIA Accounting Agency (DPAA) describes more than 7,400 Americans as "unaccounted for" from the Korean War. The United States Armed Forces estimates that 5,300 of these troops went missing in North Korea. All cases from Korea are under the purview of the Korean War Identification Project (KWIP), which is the largest project in case load and complexity within the DPAA. Korean War identification cases are especially difficult because the remains are highly commingled.

== Operation Glory ==
After the Korean Armistice, in 1954, North Korea returned the remains of more than 3,000 Americans in what was termed Operation Glory. At the same time, US Graves Registration teams recovered remains from South Korea. The US identified thousands of these remains. In 1956, 848 sets of remains that could not be identified were buried in the National Memorial Cemetery of the Pacific, known as the Punchbowl, in Honolulu, Hawaii. Others were later buried there as "unknown soldiers". Another "unknown soldier" was buried in the Tomb of the Unknowns at Arlington National Cemetery. The remains of all of these "unknown soldiers" were treated with formaldehyde, which, in later decades, made their identification through DNA testing difficult.

== Aftermath of the Cold War ==
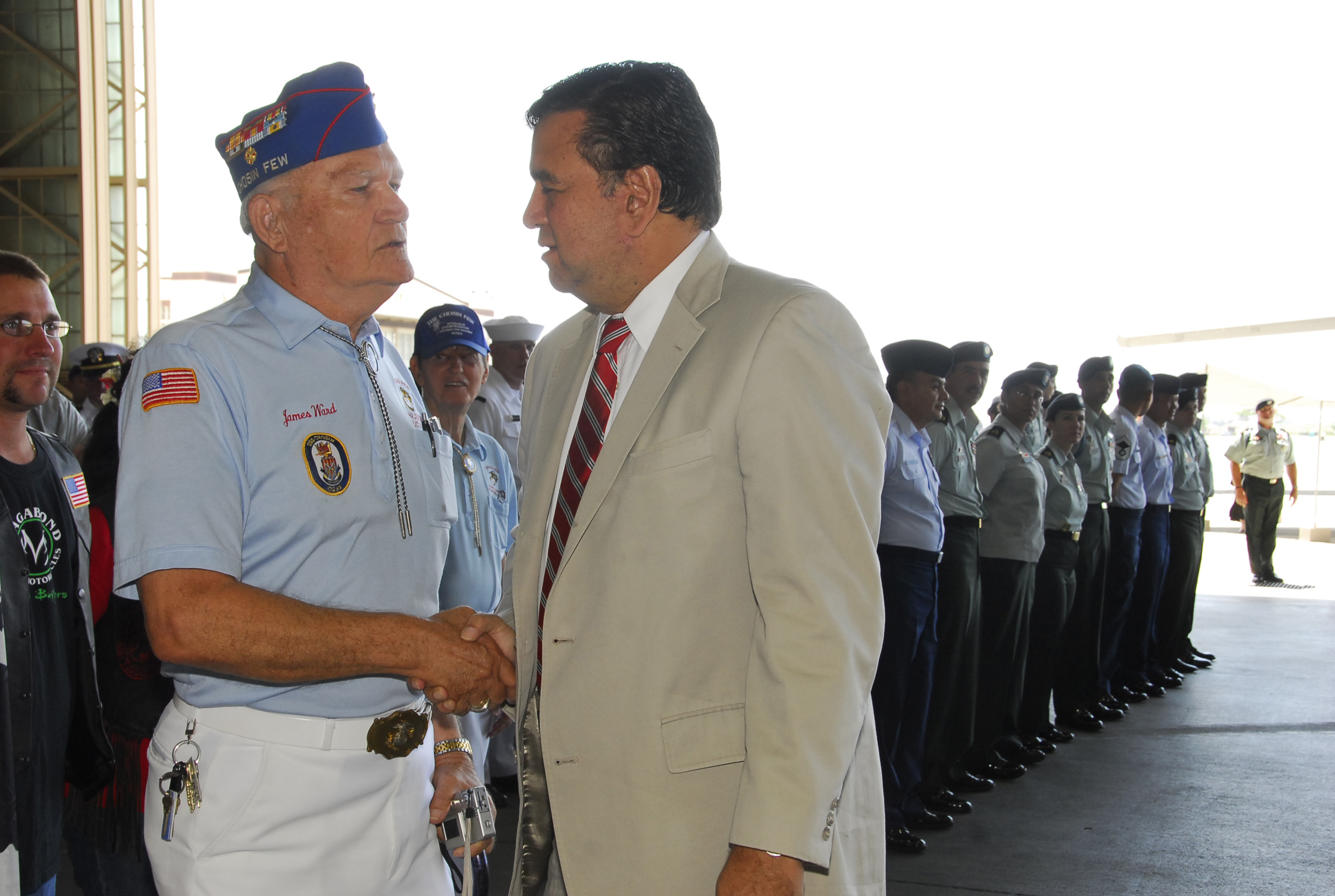
At an arrival ceremony in Hawaii on April 12, 2007, Korean War veteran James Ward thanks Governor Bill Richardson (right), who led a delegation from the U.S. to North Korea to accept the remains of U.S. service members.

From 1990 to 1994, North Korea uncovered and returned 208 boxes of remains. The United States Department of Defense's scientists estimate that the remains of as many as 400 people could be held in these boxes. By 2018, 182 people had been identified from the remains in these boxes. Every year since 1993, the DPAA has provided a briefing to the families of the missing or unaccounted for from the Korean War to update them on the status of search and identification efforts. The families are also asked to provide DNA samples to help with identification of remains. In 1995, the DNA bank only had 71 families of the over 8,000 missing, but in 2019, that number was 7,437 families. Remains are examined at the DPAA laboratory at Joint Base Pearl Harbor-Hickman, using mitochondrial DNA (mtDNA) analysis, chest radiographs, and dental and anthropological analysis. Researchers also use circumstantial evidence to assist in making an identification, such as information about where a soldier was presumed missing from, or information gleaned from military medical records.

In 1996 the US Department of Defense began dispatching teams to North Korea, carrying out 33 joint operations with the North Koreans and recovering about 220 sets of remains. The US government suspended these operations in 2005, officially because of concerns relating to the safety of US personnel. From 1996 to 2005, the US paid North Korea over US$20 million, ostensibly to cover the costs of these operations.

In 1999, the DPAA disinterred the first of the remains from the National Memorial Cemetery of the Pacific in Honolulu, or Punchbowl. The DPAA has focused on using advances in technology and DNA science to begin to identify the more than 800 remains that were buried as "Korea Unknowns." Although these remains were initially thought to be discrete individuals when they were initially interred, it is now suspected that they may also be commingled.

In 2007, North Korea sent home the remains of another seven US troops, at the time of the visit of an unofficial US delegation headed by US politician Bill Richardson. During the presidency of Barack Obama (whose term was 2009–2017), the issue was raised without results. In September 2016, North Korean officials made an offer to discuss the return of the remains of about 200 US personnel, but the Obama administration did not pursue the offer.

== 2018 Singapore Summit and beyond ==
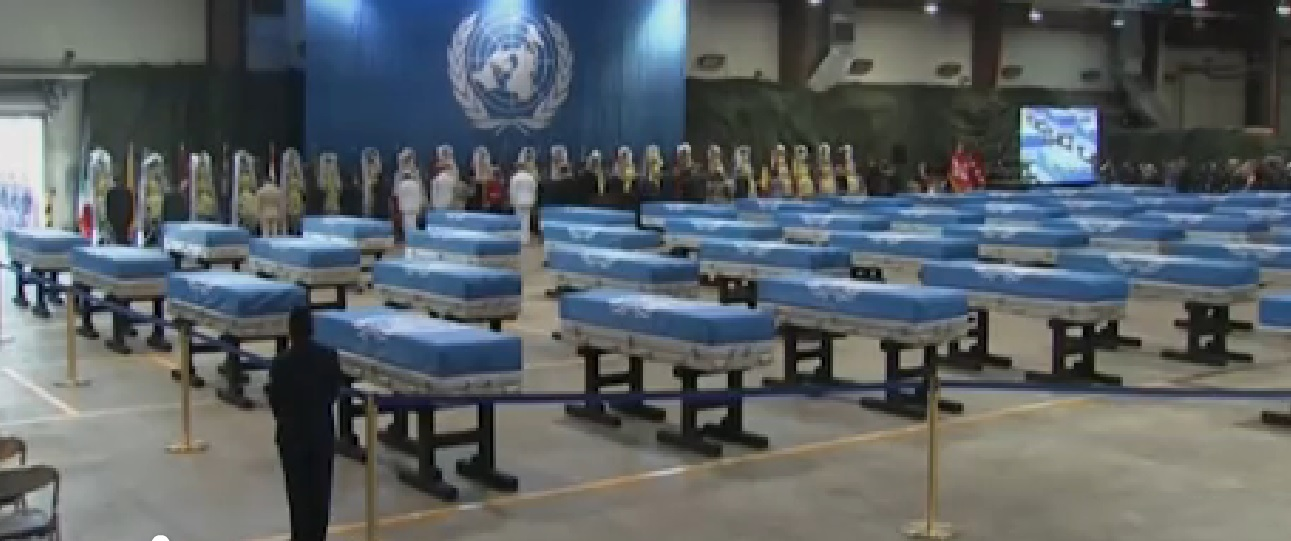
55 boxes of remains being repatriated to the US in 2018

In the Singapore Summit in 2018, US president Donald Trump and Kim Jong Un of North Korea committed "to recovering POW/MIA remains, including the immediate repatriation of those already identified". On 27 July North Korea handed over 55 boxes of human remains. The remains were saluted in a ceremony in their honor by US soldiers. The North Korean authorities reported to the U.S. Defense POW/MIA Accounting Agency that they couldn't be sure how many individuals were represented in the 55 boxes. There was only one dog tag among the remains. Other servicemen could be identified through matching DNA, chest X-rays, and dental records. Twenty boxes were retrieved from the site of the Battle of Unsan, and 35 from the site of the Battle of Chosin Reservoir. There were boots, canteens, and other equipment among the remains.

By May 2019, six US servicemen had been identified from the remains in the 55 boxes. By October 2019, it was reported that 35–40 servicemen had been identified. After the failure of the Hanoi Summit, the US suspended the program. As of 1 April 2022, 82 remains have been identified from 55 boxes; the total of remains recovered from 1996 to 2005 are 612 of whom 16 are yet unknown.

At the September 2018 inter-Korean summit, South Korean President Moon Jae-in and North Korean leader Kim Jong Un agreed to a joint operation to recover remains in part of the Korean Demilitarized Zone. The South Korean Ministry of National Defense estimated that the remains of approximately 200 South Korean soldiers, 100 American and French soldiers, and an unknown number of North Korean and Chinese soldiers are buried in the area. The remains of just over a thousand American troops are thought to be buried in or near the DMZ. On 28 July 2019, President Moon said once excavation was complete for Arrowhead Hill, they would expand it to cover the whole of the DMZ.

Also in 2018, the Korean War Identification Project received approval to disinter all the remaining unknowns from the Punchbowl in phases to try to identify them. In 2019, the disinterment process started on 652 sets of unknown remains. This will occur over the next five to seven years in phases, primarily based on the geographic location from which the remains were recovered from. Several phases have already been completed, including R.O.K. Phases one through four and D.P.R.K. Phases one through four. R.O.K. Phase 5 was scheduled to begin on 6 November 2023, and includes 40 unknown remains recovered from the Seoul area (DPAA).

On 22 September 2021, the first US-South Korean Joint repatriation service was held: the U.S. received the remains of one of six U.S. soldiers to be repatriated; South Korea received remains of two of 68 ROK soldiers to be repatriated.

On 22 February 2023, the second US-South Korean Joint repatriation service was held: the U.S. received from South Korea the remains of one U.S. soldier.

On 25 June 2023, the third US-South Korean Joint repatriation service was held: South Korea received the remains of seven ROK soldiers of whom one was identified; previous repatriation ceremonies in 2012, 2016, 2018, 2020 and 2021 have returned over 200 ROK remains to South Korea. The DPAA collaboratively worked with the South Korean Ministry of National Defense Agency for KIA Recovery and Identification (MAKRI) to analyze and identify remains.

As of 25 April 2024, the total number of unaccounted for personnel stands at 7,478, with 30 and 39 remains being identified in 2022 and 2023, respectively. The DPAA continues to announce identified remains based on the work of the Korean War Identification Project. These identified soldiers are returned to their families for burial. If the remains are found to be South Korean or Chinese in origin, the remains are returned to their home countries in repatriation ceremonies.

== See also ==
- United Nations Memorial Cemetery – in Busan, South Korea
