= Operation Glory =

Post-Korean War casualty repatriation effort

Operation Glory was an American effort to repatriate the remains of United Nations Command casualties from North Korea at the end of the Korean War. The Korean Armistice Agreement of July 1953 called for the repatriation of all casualties and prisoners of war, and through September and October 1954 the Graves Registration Service Command received the remains of approximately 4,000 casualties. Of the 1,868 American remains, 848 unidentified remains were buried as "unknowns" at the National Memorial Cemetery of the Pacific in Hawaii.

Some of the remains came from the temporary military cemeteries in North Korea that had been abandoned as Chinese forces pushed US forces out of North Korea. Public ceremonies involving delivery of the returned remains included honor guards. Also exchanged were the remains of approximately 14,000 North Korean and Chinese casualties.

== See also ==
- Recovery of U.S. human remains from the Korean War
- United Nations Memorial Cemetery – in Busan, South Korea
