= Defense POW/MIA Accounting Agency =

United States government agency

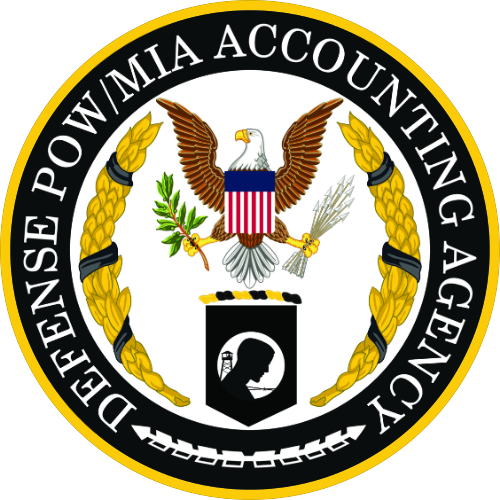
- Seal of the Defense POW/MIA; Accounting Agency

Department overview
- Formed: January 15, 2015
- Jurisdiction: Federal government of the United States
- Headquarters: 2600 Defense Pentagon, Washington, D.C.; 38°52′15″N 77°03′19″W
- Annual budget: US$196 million (2024)
- Department executives: Kelly McKeague, Director; Fern Sumpter Winbush, Principal Deputy Director; John Figuerres, Deputy Director for Operations; Sergeant Major Anthony Worsley, Senior Enlisted Advisor
- Parent department: U.S. Department of Defense
- Website: dpaa.mil

The Defense POW/MIA Accounting Agency (DPAA) is an agency within the U.S. Department of Defense whose mission is to recover and identify unaccounted Department of Defense personnel listed as prisoners of war (POW) or missing in action (MIA) from designated past conflicts, from countries around the world.

== History ==
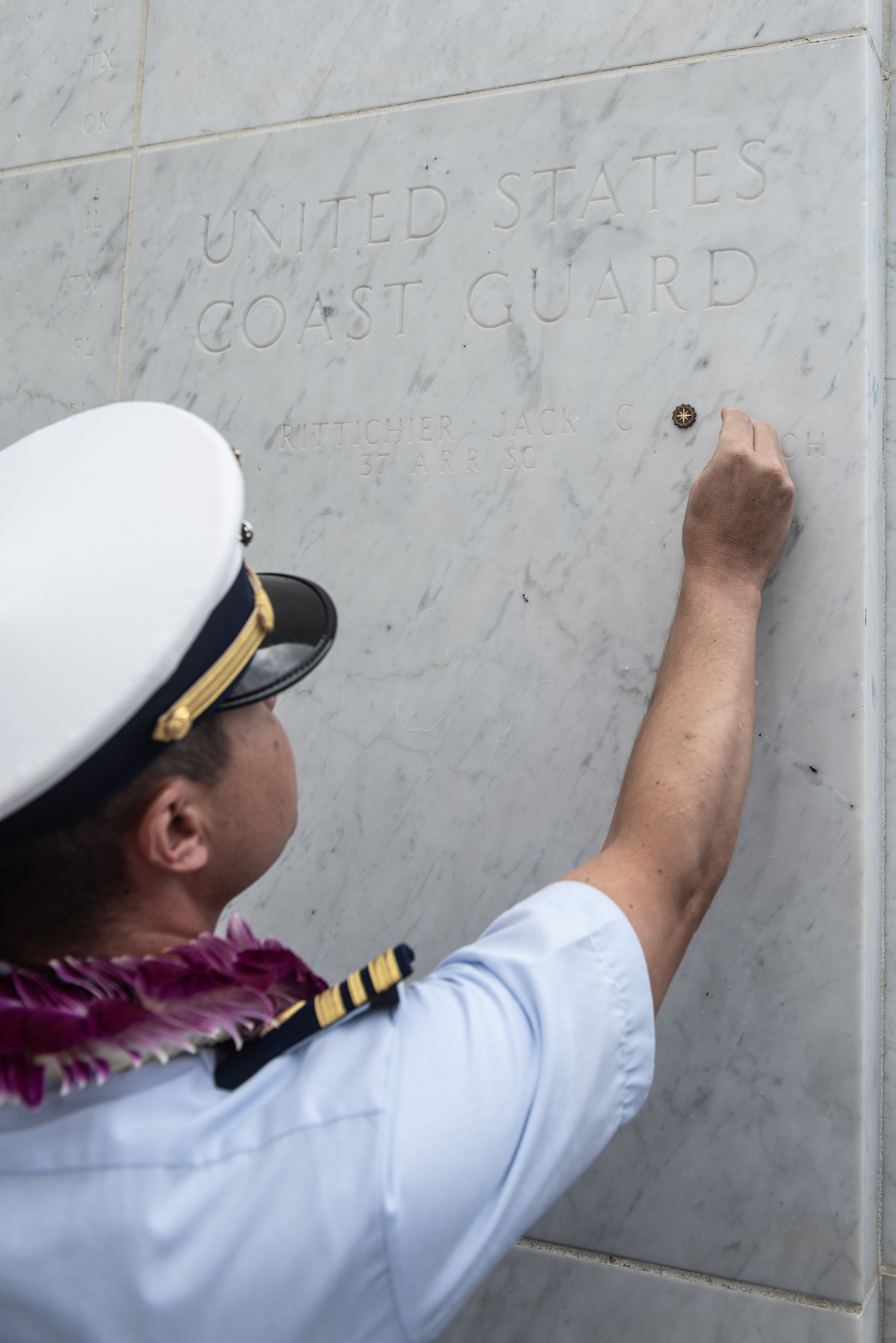
U.S. Coast Guard Lt. Cmdr. Henry Ritticher, Gold Star brother to Lt. Jack C. Ritticher, places a rosette after Rittcher's name during the National POW/MIA Recognition Day Ceremony hosted by the Defense POW/MIA Accounting Agency (DPAA) at National Memorial Cemetery of the Pacific, Honolulu, Hawaii, Sept. 20, 2024. The rosette signifies Rittcher's remains have been found and identified and is no longer missing in action (MIA).

The Defense POW/MIA Accounting Agency was formed on January 15, 2015, as the result of the merger of the Joint POW/MIA Accounting Command (JPAC), the Defense Prisoner of War/Missing Personnel Office, and parts of the United States Air Force's Life Sciences Lab. Scientific laboratories are maintained at Offutt Air Force Base, Nebraska, and Joint Base Pearl Harbor–Hickam, Hawaii, with their headquarters located at the Pentagon in Washington D.C.

As of 2018, DPAA was in a cooperative agreement with the Henry M. Jackson Foundation for the Advancement of Military Medicine, which provides operational support during worldwide recovery operations. Following the 2023 wildfires in Maui, the agency assisted in identifying victims' remains.

== See also ==
- Recovery of U.S. human remains from the Korean War
