= Joint Personnel Recovery Center =

Vietnam War United States defense task force

The Joint Personnel Recovery Center (often referred to as JPRC) was a joint task force within Military Assistance Command, Vietnam (MACV) active from 1966 to 1973, whose mission was to account for United States, South Vietnamese and Free World Military Assistance Forces (FWMAF) personnel listed as Prisoners of War (POW) or Missing in Action (MIA) in the Vietnam War.

== History ==
=== Background ===
In June 1965 the US Embassy Mission Council in Saigon established a Committee on Prisoners and Detainees with membership composed of representatives from each element of the country mission team. Under Embassy chairmanship, the committee was given the primary responsibility for formulating policy recommendations and coordinating actions relating to US POWs and civilian detainees held by the Vietcong (VC) in South Vietnam. The committee was also tasked to formulate policy recommendations to the Mission on US POWs held in North Vietnam and third country civilian detainees and military prisoners held by the VC in South Vietnam. The committee was further tasked to initiate necessary liaison with South Vietnamese authorities and to coordinate any necessary Mission action that might be required concerning US prisoners or detainees in third countries, specifically Laos.

Acting on the recommendations of the committee, and with the concurrence of the Mission Council, the Ambassador, General Maxwell Taylor, established a Joint Recovery Center (JRC) which would: (a) be staffed by individuals provided by the Department of Defense, US Overseas Mission, US Information Service, the Embassy and Controlled American Source (CAS) (i.e. Central Intelligence Agency); (b) be directly responsible to the Ambassador for all operational matters; and (c) coordinate operations in adjacent areas, particularly Laos with the appropriate embassy or command

=== Establishment and role ===
The JPRC was formed in September 1966 as Military Assistance Command, Vietnam – Studies and Observations Group (MACV-SOG) OP-80 to establish a personnel recovery capability within MACV. The JPRC was responsible for evaluating information on missing or captured US personnel and coordinating and conducting personnel recovery operations throughout Southeast Asia. Personal data files, including photographs were maintained on all US and FWMAF personnel in a detained or MIA status. These files included a personal authenticator for all downed US aircrews.

JPRC was in daily contact with intelligence sources including MACV J-2, the Joint Search and Rescue Center, CAS in Saigon and Vientiane, 525th Military Intelligence Group, Detachment 6, 6499th Special Activities Group, MACV-COC, 7th Fleet Combat information centers and US embassies in Southeast Asia. JPRC processed all available information and based on this, recommended and coordinated appropriate recovery operations. Forces under the operational control of MACV-SOG were used for operations whenever possible. When larger forces were required other MACV elements were tasked as necessary.

A psychological warfare program was conducted to advertise rewards offered for assisting in the recovery of personnel. By 1967 over 200 million leaflets were dropped in North Vietnam, South Vietnam and along the South Vietnamese-Cambodian border. The reward program resulted in the return of four US Army and two US Air Force personnel and nine dead personnel and information on the status of 22 US prisoners.

=== Operations ===
During 1967 the JPRC was involved in 39 attempted POW recovery operations.

During 1968 the JPRC was involved in 32 attempted POW recovery operations, of which eight were successful, resulting in the recovery of 155 South Vietnamese POWs.

During 1969 the JPRC was involved in 29 attempted POW recovery operations, of which 9 were successful, resulting in the recovery of 117 South Vietnamese POWs.

In early April 1972, following the loss of three helicopters and two aircraft in the Rescue of Bat 21 Bravo, JPRC commander, United States Marine Corps Lieutenant colonel Andrew E. Andersen was tasked with organising the ground rescue of Lieutenant colonel Iceal Hambleton who had been evading capture for six days. On 13 April Hambleton was successfully rescued by Lieutenant Thomas R. Norris and Republic of Vietnam Navy Petty Officer Nguyen Van Kiet.

Throughout its existence the JPRC never recovered a single US POW.

=== Deactivation ===
In April 1972 the ten JPRC personnel and their MIA records were transferred from MACV-SOG to the Director of Intelligence, J-2, MACV. At the end of November 1972, JPRC was provisionally renamed the Joint Casualty Recovery Center.

On 23 January 1973, in anticipation of the imminent signing of the Paris Peace Accords, the Joint Casualty Resolution Center was activated under the command of Brigadier general Robert Kingston with its temporary headquarters at the MACV Headquarters complex at Tan Son Nhut.

== List of commanders ==
- General Harry C. Aderholt (July–December 1966)
- Colonel A.T. Sampson (January–October 1967)
- Colonel B.S. Keller (October 1967-March 1968)
- Lieutenant colonel G.R. Reinker (July 1969-July 1970)
- Colonel Gerald E. McIlmoyle (October 1970-March 1971)

== See also ==
- Vietnam War POW/MIA issue
- List of United States servicemembers and civilians missing in action during the Vietnam War (1961–65)
- List of United States servicemembers and civilians missing in action during the Vietnam War (1966–67)
- List of United States servicemembers and civilians missing in action during the Vietnam War (1968–69)
- List of United States servicemembers and civilians missing in action during the Vietnam War (1970–71)
- List of United States servicemembers and civilians missing in action during the Vietnam War (1972–75)
