= Joint Casualty Resolution Center =

Vietnam War United States defense task force

The Joint Casualty Resolution Center (often referred to as JCRC) was a joint task force within the United States Department of Defense, whose mission was to account for United States personnel listed as Missing in Action (MIA) in the Vietnam War.

== History ==
=== Background ===
The JCRC's precursor organisation, the Joint Personnel Recovery Center (JPRC) was established in September 1966 under the control of Military Assistance Command, Vietnam – Studies and Observations Group (MACV-SOG) to establish a personnel recovery capability within Military Assistance Command, Vietnam (MACV). The JPRC was responsible for evaluating information on missing or captured US personnel and coordinating and conducting personnel recovery operations throughout Southeast Asia.

While JPRC successfully coordinated missions that recovered South Vietnamese Prisoners of War (POWs), throughout its existence the JPRC never recovered a single US POW.

In April 1972 the ten JPRC personnel and their MIA records were transferred from MACV-SOG to the Director of Intelligence, J-2, MACV. At the end of November 1972, JPRC was provisionally renamed the Joint Casualty Recovery Center.

=== Activation ===
On 23 January 1973, in anticipation of the imminent signing of the Paris Peace Accords, the JCRC was activated under the command of Brigadier general Robert Kingston with its temporary headquarters at the MACV Headquarters complex at Tan Son Nhut, Saigon.

Unlike the JPRC with its focus on POW rescue, the JCRC's mission was to resolve the status of the then 2,441 Americans MIA in Indochina.

The first activity of the JCRC was Operation Homecoming. When the first groups of US POWs were released by North Vietnam and the Vietcong (VC), JCRC personnel were sent to Clark Air Force Base in The Philippines to assist in the initial POW debriefings. They worked with service debriefers to obtain information on missing personnel who were not being released in the POW exchange in an attempt to obtain more complete details of those who were still carried as MIA.

By late January 1973 the proposed 110-man JCRC had been increased by 29 personnel on the recommendation of CINCPAC. This increase resulted in he expansion of field teams to 11, six to conduct casualty resolution operations in Laos and the Khmer Republic and five in South Vietnam. The teams would be augmented by specialists as required. Two control teams and launch units were formed with the missions of dispatching field teams and providing command and control while they were operating in the field. The JCRC teams interviewed refugees, searched crash sites and participated in technical talks with the North Vietnamese. The US Army's Central Identification Laboratory supported the JCRC with the recovery and identification of remains.

Under the terms of the Paris Peace Accords, MACV and all American and third country forces had to be withdrawn from South Vietnam within 60 days of the ceasefire. A multi-service organization was required to plan for the application of U.S. air and naval power into North or South Vietnam, Cambodia or Laos, should this be required and ordered. Called the United States Support Activities Group & 7th Air Force (USSAG/7th AF), it was to be located at Nakhon Phanom Royal Thai Air Force Base in northeast Thailand and was activated on 11 February 1973. On 15 February the JCRC was transferred to Nakhon Phanom and USSAG/7th AF command.

=== Operations ===
On 15 December 1973 Captain Richard Morgan Rees serving with Field Team 6, Control Team B, Headquarters, JCRC was killed when VC forces ambushed a joint US-South Vietnamese team engaged on an MIA recovery mission 15 miles (24 km) southwest of Saigon. A South Vietnamese pilot was also killed in the attack and another four Americans were wounded. As a result of this attack all US MIA field recovery efforts were indefinitely suspended.

=== Reorganisation ===
Following a directive from the Joint Chiefs of Staff, CINCPAC on 11 June 1975 directed the disestablishment of USSAG/7th AF. The disestablishment was effective at 17:00 on 30 June. With the disestablishment of USSAG/7th AF, control of the JCRC reverted to CINCPAC.

In May 1976 the JCRC moved to Naval Air Station Barbers Point, Oahu, Hawaii.

In 1992 the JCRC became the Joint Task Force - Full Accounting.

== List of commanders ==
- Brigadier general Robert Kingston (January–December 1973)
- Brigadier general Joseph R. Ulatoski (January–December 1974)

== See also ==
- Vietnam War POW/MIA issue
- List of United States servicemembers and civilians missing in action during the Vietnam War (1961–65)
- List of United States servicemembers and civilians missing in action during the Vietnam War (1966–67)
- List of United States servicemembers and civilians missing in action during the Vietnam War (1968–69)
- List of United States servicemembers and civilians missing in action during the Vietnam War (1970–71)
- List of United States servicemembers and civilians missing in action during the Vietnam War (1972–75)
