= Harry C. Aderholt =

United States Air Force general

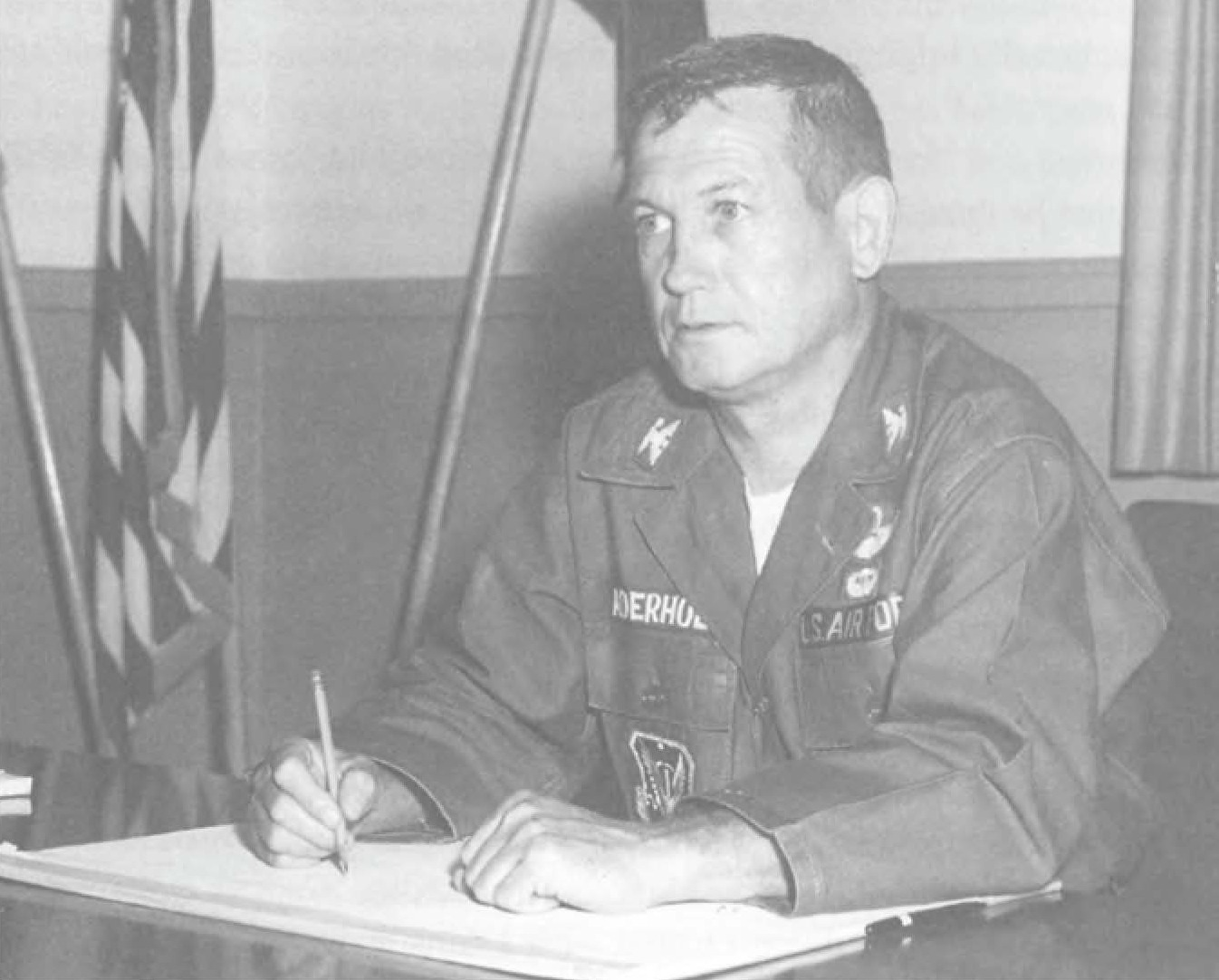
- Aderholt in 1964
- Born: January 6, 1920; Birmingham, Alabama
- Died: May 20, 2010 (aged 90)
- Military career
- Allegiance: United States of America
- Branch: United States Army Air Corps; United States Air Force
- Service years: 1942–1976
- Rank: Brigadier general
- Nickname: Heinie
- Conflicts: World War II; Korean War; Vietnam War

Harry Clay "Heinie" Aderholt (January 6, 1920 – May 20, 2010) was an American brigadier general in the United States Air Force and a prominent figure in air force special operations.

== Biography ==
Aderholt was born in Birmingham, Alabama, in 1920. He entered active military duty through the aviation cadet program in April 1942 and graduated from pilot training with a commission as a second lieutenant in the U.S. Army Air Forces in May 1943.

During World War II, from October 1943 to August 1945, Aderholt served in North Africa and Italy as a B-17 and C-47 pilot.

In September 1945 Aderholt went to Maxwell Air Force Base, Alabama, assigned as a staff pilot with the Army Air Forces Eastern Flying Training Command. After completion of Air Tactical School at Tyndall Air Force Base, Florida, in December 1948, Aderholt returned to Maxwell and served as a flight instructor and flying safety officer with the 3800th Air Base Wing.

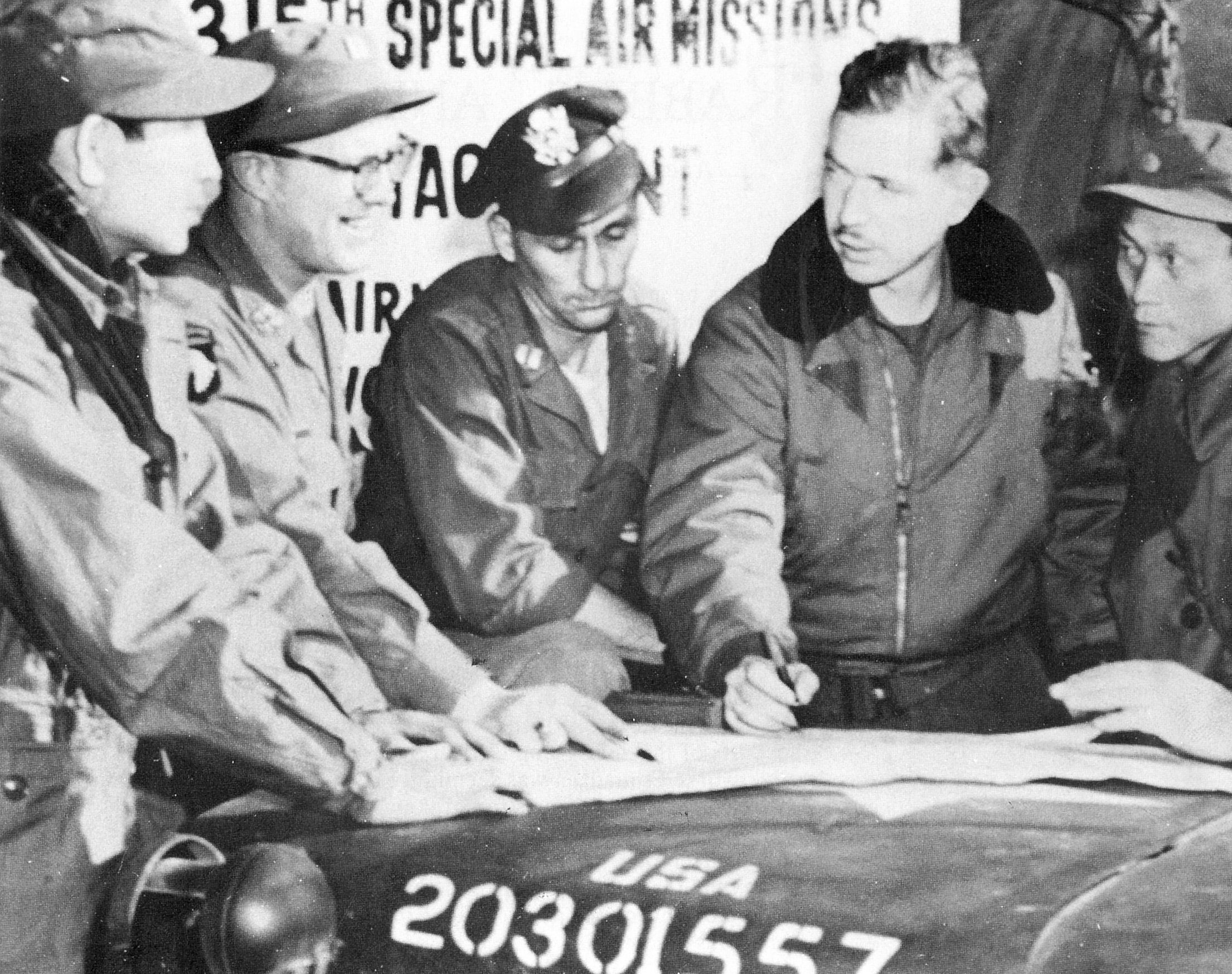
USAF and Army officers coordinating a "Special Air Mission" with their South Korean counterparts during the Korean War, 1951. Major Harry C. Aderholt is second from right, in the fur-collared flight jacket.

During the Korean War, from July 1950 to September 1951, Aderholt commanded a Special Air Warfare Detachment of the 21st Troop Carrier Squadron. He next was assigned as an operations staff officer with the 1007th Air Intelligence Service Group in Washington, D.C. In June 1953 he was transferred to Donaldson Air Force Base, South Carolina, where he served with Headquarters Eighteenth Air Force as tactical and operations staff officer in the Directorate of Operations and Training.

In October 1954, Aderholt was assigned to Headquarters United States Air Forces in Europe, Wiesbaden Air Base, Germany, and served in the Directorate of Plans as an unconventional warfare planning staff officer.

In September 1957 Aderholt returned to Washington, D.C., assigned to the 1007th Air Intelligence Service Group as a special warfare staff officer, and in September 1959 joined the 1040th United States Air Force Field Activity Squadron in the same capacity.

Aderholt left for Okinawa in January 1960 where he became commander of the 1095th Operational Evaluation Training Group. During this assignment, he contributed to the pioneering of special air warfare techniques, and was instrumental in developing the Laos airfield complex known as Lima sites. These fields were used throughout Southeast Asia as support sites for special warfare operations and as CH-3 "Jolly Green" helicopter forward staging bases for rescue and recovery operations in Laos and North Vietnam.

From August 1962 to February 1964, Aderholt served as special advisor to the commander of the United States Air Force Special Air Warfare Center (SAWC) at Eglin Air Force Base, Florida. During this period, he contributed to and participated in RAND Corporation studies which resulted in the publication of the Single Integrated Attack Team Study. He then was transferred to Hurlburt Field, Florida, (Eglin Auxiliary Field 9) where he served as vice commander and commander of the famed 1st Air Commando Wing.

Aderholt left for the Republic of the Philippines in August 1965 where he was assigned as deputy commander for plans and operations with the 6200th Materiel Wing at Clark Air Base. While in this assignment, he joined the United States Military Assistance Command, Vietnam, where he conceived and activated the Joint Personnel Recovery Center in Saigon, and served as chief from July to December 1966. He then was selected by Headquarters Pacific Air Forces to activate the 56th Air Commando Wing at Nakhon Phanom Royal Thai Air Force Base, Thailand. This wing, which he organized and commanded from December 1966 to December 1967, conducted low-level night interdiction missions over the Ho Chi Minh Trail in Laos and North Vietnam, using prop-driven aircraft. The efforts of this wing were so successful in slowing infiltration that the enemy reacted by greatly increasing anti-aircraft defenses and committing a large amount of his total assets to keep the trail open.

In January 1968 Aderholt was reassigned to the United States Air Force Special Air Warfare Center, later redesignated United States Air Force Special Operations Force (SOF), at Eglin Air Force Base, Florida, to serve as deputy chief of staff for operations.

Aderholt returned to Thailand in June 1970 for a two-year tour of duty as chief of the Air Force Advisory Group, Joint United States Military Advisory Group, in Bangkok. He retired from active military duty in December 1972 at Eglin Air Force Base, Florida.

He was recalled to active duty in October 1973 and assigned as deputy commander, United States Military Assistance Command Thailand, and deputy chief, Joint United States Military Advisory Group - Thailand, with headquarters at Bangkok.

Aderholt became commander, USMACTHAI, and chief, JUSMAG, Thailand, in May 1975.

== Evacuation of the Hmong ==
One of Aderholt's prouder moments was his assistance in evacuating Hmong leaders from Laos as the Pathet Lao communist army advanced on their base at Long Tieng in May 1975. The United States by that time had withdrawn all its civilian and military personnel from Indochina, except for a few Embassy personnel in Laos. Aderholt was the last American general on the ground in Southeast Asia. He had few resources. Aderholt was informed that help was needed to evacuate the Hmong who for more than a decade had comprised the "secret army" in Laos assisting the United States in fending off the North Vietnamese Army in the Lao Civil War. He located one American C-130 transport aircraft and two CASI C-46 aircraft and pilots in Thailand. He had the planes "sheep dipped" to remove all markings identifying them as American-owned and sent them to Long Tieng. In four days of intense activity, the transport planes evacuated more than 2,000 Hmong, including General Vang Pao and Jerry Daniels, his CIA case officer.

During the last few years of his life, from 2002 until 2010, Aderholt was directly involved with the Thailand Laos Cambodia Brotherhood as a member of the TLC Assistance Committee working to raise many thousands of dollars of funds and also made several trips back to Northeast Thailand and Laos hands on involved with humanitarian aid. The TLC Brotherhood has dedicated an assistance project in his memory and many of the members of the TLC Brotherhood served at Nakhon Phanom at all phases.

== Decorations ==
His military decorations and awards include the Legion of Merit with two oak leaf clusters, Distinguished Flying Cross with oak leaf cluster, Bronze Star Medal with oak leaf cluster, Meritorious Service Medal, Air Medal with eight oak leaf clusters, Joint Service Commendation Medal, Air Force Commendation Medal, Presidential Unit Citation Emblem, and the Air Force Outstanding Unit Award Ribbon with oak leaf cluster. He is a command pilot and wears the Parachutist Badge.

Aderholt was promoted to major in February 1951; lieutenant colonel in March 1961; and colonel in January 1964. He was promoted to the grade of brigadier general effective May 31, 1974, with date of rank May 25, 1974.
