= Robert Kingston =

United States general (1928–2007)

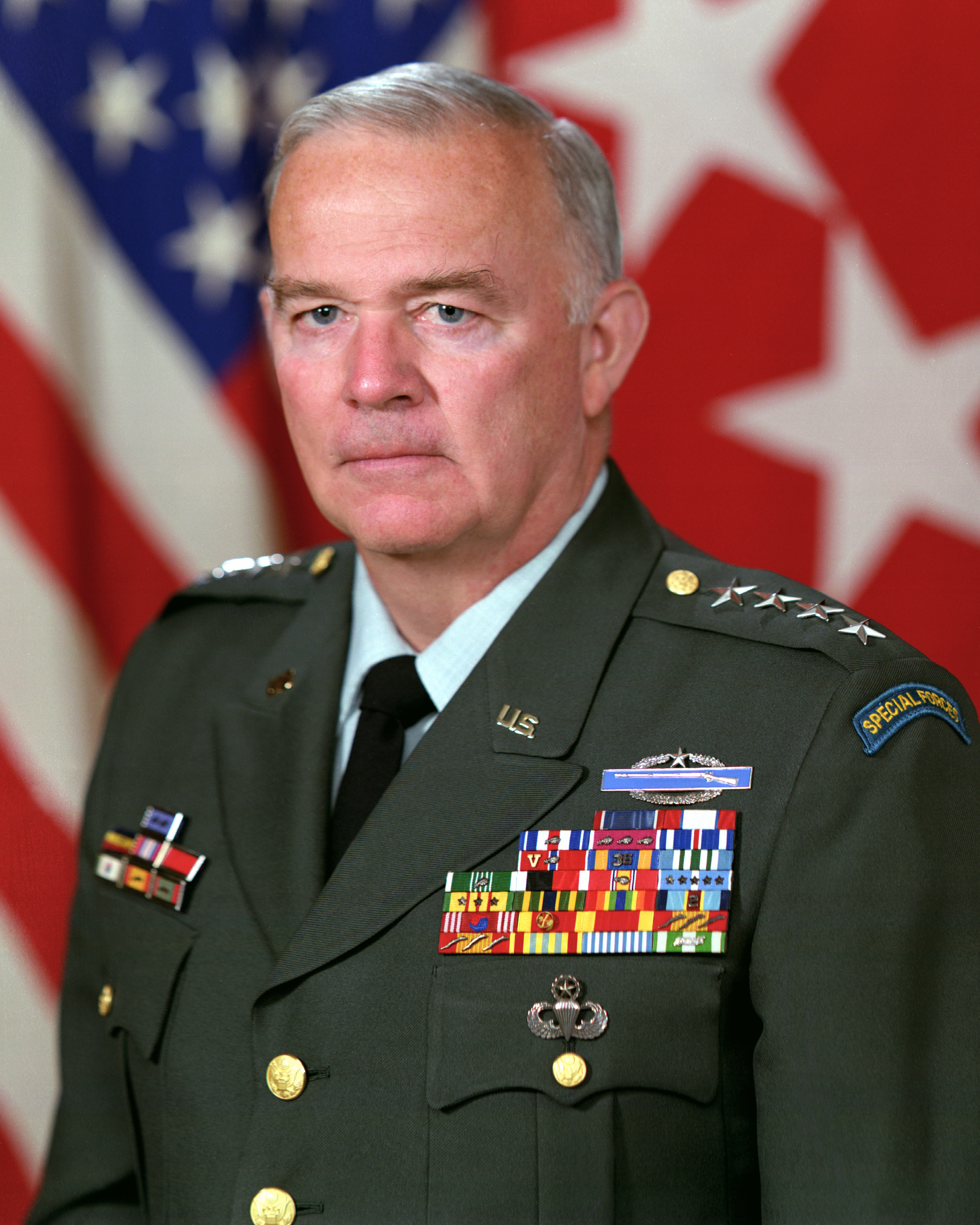
- Kingston in 1984
- Born: 16 July 1928; Brookline, Massachusetts, U.S.
- Died: 28 February 2007 (aged 78); Alexandria, Virginia, U.S.
- Burial place: Arlington National Cemetery
- Military career
- Allegiance: United States
- Branch: United States Army
- Service years: 1948–1985
- Rank: General
- Nicknames: "Bulldog" "Bulldog Bob"
- Commands: United States Central Command
- Conflicts: Korean War; Vietnam War
- Awards: Distinguished Service Cross; Army Distinguished Service Medal; Silver Star (2); Legion of Merit (4); Distinguished Flying Cross; Bronze Star Medal (2)

Robert Charles Kingston (16 July 1928 – 28 February 2007) was a United States Army general who served as the first commander of U.S. Central Command.

== Early life and education ==
Kingston was born in Brookline, Massachusetts on 16 July 1928, and graduated from Brookline High School in 1947. He entered the United States Army as an enlisted soldier in November 1948. The following year he attended Officer Candidate School at Fort Riley, Kansas and was commissioned as a second lieutenant in the Infantry on 20 December 1949. Kingston later completed a Bachelor of Arts degree in education at the University of Omaha in 1965 and earned an M.S. degree in international relations from George Washington University. He graduated from the Army Command and General Staff College in 1960.

== Military career ==
As a second lieutenant, Kingston commanded Task Force Kingston in the early phase of the Korean War, driving his unit all the way to the Yalu River. He was awarded two Silver Stars for his actions.

Kingston commanded troops at each level from platoon to brigade. In 1970 he was assigned as the deputy secretary of the General Staff, Office of the Chief of Staff, U.S. Army. In June 1972 General Kingston returned to South Vietnam, where he was promoted to brigadier general in December and served as deputy commanding general, Second Regional Assistance Command and as deputy senior advisor, II Corps and Military Region 2.

In January 1973, Kingston assumed command of the Joint Casualty Resolution Center at Nakhon Phanom Royal Thai Air Force Base, Thailand. Upon his return to the United States in 1974, he assumed duties as assistant division commander of the First Infantry Division and was promoted to major general in September 1975. He assumed command of the US Army John F. Kennedy Center for Military Assistance and the U.S. Army Institute for Military Assistance at Fort Bragg in 1975. Leaving Fort Bragg, General Kingston assumed command of the Army's 2nd Infantry Division in Dongducheon, Korea and served as commanding general from June 1979 – June 1981.

Following his promotion to lieutenant general in 1981, he assumed command of the Rapid Deployment Joint Task Force, MacDill Air Force Base Florida. The Rapid Deployment Force was reorganized as the United States Central Command on 1 January 1983. On 6 November 1984, he was promoted to general, and a year later he retired from active duty.

=== Distinguished Service Cross ===
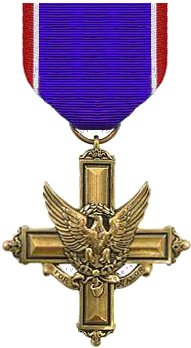

Robert Charles Kingston
Rank and organization: Lieutenant Colonel, U.S. Army, 1st Battalion, 35th Infantry Regiment, 25th Infantry Division
Place and date: Republic of Vietnam, 22 November 1966 to 24 November 1966
Entered service at: Brookline, Massachusetts
Born: 16 July 1928, Brookline, Massachusetts
G.O. No.: 7024, 25 December 1966

Citation:

The President of the United States of America, authorized by Act of Congress, 9 July 1918 (amended by act of July 25, 1963), takes pleasure in presenting the Distinguished Service Cross to Lieutenant Colonel (Infantry) Robert Charles Kingston (ASN: 0-71534), United States Army, for extraordinary heroism in connection with military operations involving conflict with an armed hostile force in the Republic of Vietnam, while serving with Headquarters, 1st Battalion, 35th Infantry, 3d Brigade, 25th Infantry Division. Lieutenant Colonel Kingston distinguished himself by exceptionally valorous actions during the period 22 November 1966 to 24 November 1966 while commanding elements of the 1st Battalion, 35th Infantry Division on a search and destroy mission. When two of his companies made contact with the forward positions of a Viet Cong battalion, Colonel Kingston landed by helicopter and assumed control of ground operations. In the evening of 22 November 1966 when the lead company was pinned down by intense automatic weapons fire, Colonel Kingston, with complete disregard for his safety, charged a wounded Viet Cong and wrestled a weapon from him. While firing the captured weapon, he then led an assault on the hostile positions and forced the insurgents to flee. Throughout the three day period, Colonel Kingston repeatedly exposed himself to hostile fire, to encourage his troops and direct air strikes and artillery against the Viet Cong emplacements. His aggressive leadership and personal courage inspired his men to fight with renewed vigor and defeat the numerically superior hostile force. Colonel Kingston's extraordinary heroism and devotion to duty were in keeping with the highest traditions of the military service and reflect great credit upon himself, his unit, and the United States Army.

== Later life and death ==
Kingston died on 28 February 2007, at the age of 78, due to complications from a fall. On March 23, 2007, he was interred at Arlington National Cemetery next to his wife Josephine R. "Jo" (Rae) Kingston (5 January 1924 – 11 July 1992).

== Awards and decorations ==

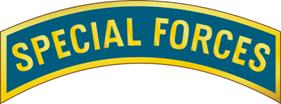

Military offices
New command	Commander-in-Chief of United States Central Command; 1983–1985	Succeeded by George B. Crist
