= List of United States servicemembers and civilians missing in action during the Vietnam War (1970–71) =

This article is a list of US MIAs of the Vietnam War in the period from 1969 to 1971. In 1973, the United States listed 2,646 Americans as unaccounted for from the entire Vietnam War. By October 2022, 1,582 Americans remained unaccounted for, of which 1,004 were classified as further pursuit, 488 as non-recoverable and 90 as deferred.

== 1970 ==
Date missing	Surname, First name(s)	Rank	Service	Unit	Operation/Battle Name	Location	Circumstances of loss	Recovery status
January 2	Fryar, Bruce C	Lieutenant	US Navy	VA-196, USS Ranger	Operation Steel Tiger	Laos, Khammouane Province	Pilot of A-6A #152937 hit by enemy fire on a bombing run, both crewmen ejected and a pararescueman confirmed he was dead but was unable to recover the body. The remains of the Bombardier/navigator LTJG Nicholas Brooks were returned in 1982	Presumptive finding of death
January 2	Lindstrom, Ronnie G	1st Lieutenant	USAF	25th Tactical Fighter Squadron	Operation Steel Tiger	Laos, Savannakhet Province	Weapons system operator on F-4D #66‑8784 hit by enemy fire, no ejection observed	Presumptive finding of death
January 2	West, John T	Captain	USAF	25th Tactical Fighter Squadron	Operation Steel Tiger	Laos, Savannakhet Province	Pilot of F-4D #66‑8784 hit by enemy fire, no ejection observed	Presumptive finding of death
January 5	Burnes, Robert W	1st Lieutenant	USMC	VMFA-542	Operation Steel Tiger	Laos, Savannakhet Province	Radar intercept officer on F-4B #152281 hit by enemy fire, no ejection observed	Killed in action, body not recovered
January 5	Robinson, Larry W	Major	USMC	H&MS-11	Operation Steel Tiger	Laos, Savannakhet Province	Pilot of F-4B #152281 hit by enemy fire, no ejection observed	Killed in action, body not recovered
January 7	Hoff, Michael G	Lieutenant Commander	US Navy	VA-86, USS Coral Sea	Operation Steel Tiger	Laos, Savannakhet Province	His A-7A #153231 was hit by enemy fire on a strafing run, no ejection observed	Presumptive finding of death
January 7	Ochab, Robert	Captain	USAF	390th Tactical Fighter Squadron		South Vietnam, Quang Nam Province	Pilot of F-4E #67‑0357 that crashed during a low-level training flight, the weapons system operator 1LT Campbell survived	Killed in action, body not recovered
January 11	Chorlins, Richard D	1st Lieutenant	USAF	602d Special Operations Squadron	Operation Steel Tiger	Laos, Khammouane Province	His A-1H was hit by enemy fire on a night interdiction mission	Listed as killed in action, body not recovered until 17 January 2015 when he was accounted for
January 13	Tubbs, Glenn E	Specialist 5	US Army	CCS, MACV-SOG		South Vietnam, Gia Lai Province	Drowned while crossing the Tonlé San river on a long range reconnaissance patrol	Presumptive finding of death
January 28	Anderson, Gregory L	Sergeant	USAF	Detachment 9, 600th Photo Squadron	Operation Steel Tiger	Laos, Khammouane Province	Aerial photographer on HH-53B #66-14434 Jolly Green 71, shot down on a rescue mission by a MiG-21 flown by Vu Ngoc Dinh	Killed in action, body not recovered
January 28	Leeser, Leonard C	Captain	USAF	40th Aerospace Rescue and Recovery Squadron	Operation Steel Tiger	Laos, Khammouane Province	Copilot of HH-53B #66-14434 Jolly Green 71, shot down on a rescue mission	Killed in action, body not recovered
January 28	Pruett, William D	Senior Master Sergeant	USAF	40th Aerospace Rescue and Recovery Squadron	Operation Steel Tiger	Laos, Khammouane Province	Pararescueman on HH-53B #66-14434 Jolly Green 71, shot down on a rescue mission	Killed in action, body not recovered
January 28	Shinn, William C	Staff Sergeant	USAF	40th Aerospace Rescue and Recovery Squadron	Operation Steel Tiger	Laos, Khammouane Province	Flight engineer on HH-53B #66-14434 Jolly Green 71, shot down on a rescue mission	Killed in action, body not recovered
January 28	Sutton, William C	Master Sergeant	USAF	40th Aerospace Rescue and Recovery Squadron	Operation Steel Tiger	Laos, Khammouane Province	Pararescueman on HH-53B #66-14434 Jolly Green 71, shot down on a rescue mission	Killed in action, body not recovered
February 5	Lyon, James M	Captain	US Army	HHC, 2nd Brigade, 101st Airborne Division		South Vietnam, Quang Nam Province	Pilot of UH-1H #68-16441 that crashed on a flight from Hue to Phu Bai. He was severely injured in the crash and the entire crew was captured by enemy forces. He was killed by one of the guards and buried near the crash site. The remaining crew members Capt. John W. Parsels, SP5 Tom Y. Kobashigawa and SP4 Daniel Hefel were released in 1973	Died in captivity, remains not returned
February 5	Stephenson, Richard C	Lieutenant	US Navy	VA-93, USS Ranger		North Vietnam, Gulf of Tonkin	His A-7B #154391crashed into the sea on launch	Killed in action, body not recovered
February 12	Bradshaw, Robert S	1st Lieutenant	USMC	VMFA-122		South Vietnam, South China Sea	Pilot of F-4B #151454 that crashed at sea offshore of Quang Tri Province	Killed in action, body not recovered
February 12	Breeding, Michael H	1st Lieutenant	USMC	VMFA-122		South Vietnam, South China Sea	Radar intercept operator on F-4B #151454 that crashed at sea offshore of Quang Tri Province	Killed in action, body not recovered
February 18	Gillen, Thomas E	Major	USAF	435th Tactical Fighter Squadron	Operation Barrel Roll	Laos, Xiangkhouang Province	Pilot of F-4D #66‑7526 shot down on a bombing mission. The weapons system operator Capt Robert S Dotson ejected successfully and was rescued	Presumptive finding of death
February 20	Moore, Scott F	Aviation Maintenance Administrationman 3rd Class	US Navy	HC-7		South Vietnam, South China Sea	Crewman on SH-3A #149908 that crashed at sea	Killed in action, body not recovered
February 28	Boyle, William	Sergeant First Class	US Army	CCC, MACV-SOG		Laos, Attapeu Province	Passenger on ARVN CH-34 #55-4324 hit by an enemy rocket, exploded and caught fire. No recoverable remains	Killed in action, body not recovered
March 2	McVey, Lavoy D	Captain	USMC	C Company, 1st Reconnaissance Battalion		South Vietnam, Quang Nam Province	Fell from a hoist while being lowered to search for 2LT David Skibbe	Killed in action, body not recovered
March 2	Skibbe, David W	2nd Lieutenant	USMC	1st Reconnaissance Battalion		South Vietnam, Quang Nam Province	Wounded during an ambush he was being extracted by a CH-46D of HMM-263 when the hoist broke and he fell to the ground. His body could not be located due to strong enemy presence	Killed in action, body not recovered
March 4	Parker, John J	Lieutenant	US Navy	VA-86, USS Coral Sea		North Vietnam, South China Sea	His A-7A #153136 crashed into the sea immediately after launch	Killed in action, body not recovered
March 5	Rosenbach, Robert P	Captain	USAF	308th Tactical Fighter Squadron		South Vietnam, South China Sea	His F-100D crashed at sea offshore of Tuy Hoa Air Base while returning from a night bombing mission	Presumptive finding of death
March 7	Gates, Albert H	Captain	USMC	HMM-263		South Vietnam, South China Sea	Pilot of CH-46D #154808 that crashed at sea offshore of Danang	Killed in action, body not recovered
March 9	Cotten, Larry W	1st Lieutenant	USAF	4th Tactical Fighter Squadron	Operation Steel Tiger	Laos, Attapeu Province	Weapons system operator on F-4E #67‑0282 hit by enemy fire and crashed	Killed in action, body not recovered
March 9	Terla, Lothar G	Captain	USAF	4th Tactical Fighter Squadron	Operation Steel Tiger	Laos, Attapeu Province	Pilot of F-4E #67‑0282 hit by enemy fire and crashed	Killed in action, body not recovered
March 9	Parcels, Rex L	Lieutenant (LTJG)	US Navy	VF-21, USS Ranger		North Vietnam, Gulf of Tonkin	Radar intercept officer on F-4J #155775 that disappeared on an air combat patrol	Killed in action, body not recovered
March 9	Schoeppner, Leonard J	Lieutenant	US Navy	VF-21, USS Ranger		North Vietnam, Gulf of Tonkin	Pilot of F-4J #155775 that disappeared on an air combat patrol	Killed in action, body not recovered
March 9	Robinson, Edward	Specialist 6	US Army	175th Radio Research Company		South Vietnam, Con Dao	Drowned while swimming	Killed in action, body not recovered
March 12	Scull, Gary B	2nd Lieutenant	US Army	Advisory Team 3, MACV Advisers		South Vietnam, Quang Tri Province	Adviser assigned to the ARVN 2nd Regiment, disappeared when the ARVN position at the Khe Gio Bridge was overrun by enemy forces	Presumptive finding of death
March 13	Pugh, Dennis G	1st Lieutenant	USAF	25th Tactical Fighter Squadron	Operation Steel Tiger	Laos, Khammouane Province	Weapons system operator on F-4D #66‑8696 shot down on a FAC mission, both crewmen ejected successfully and he radioed for ordnance to be dropped on his position as he was surrounded by enemy forces. The pilot Capt Richard Rash was rescued	Presumptive finding of death
March 19	Ayers, Darrell E	Staff Sergeant	USMC	1st Force Reconnaissance Company		South Vietnam, Quang Nam Province	Killed while on patrol, his body could not be recovered	Killed in action, body not recovered
March 21	Gonzales, David	Sergeant	USMC	HML-167		Laos, Xekong Province	Gunner on UH-1E #152427 shot down on a covert Prairie Fire insertion mission. The pilot 1LT Larry Parsons survived and was rescued 19 days later, while the copilot 1LT Robert Castle was killed and his remains were recovered	Killed in action, body not recovered
March 21	Underwood, Thomas W	Staff Sergeant	USMC	HML-167		Laos, Xekong Province	Crew chief on UH-1E #152427 shot down on a covert insertion mission	Killed in action, body not recovered
March 26	Allen, Henry L	1st Lieutenant	USAF	Detachment 1 (Udorn), 56th Special Operations Wing		Laos, Savannakhet Province	Pilot of O-1G that disappeared on a familiarisation flight. The remains of the copilot Maj. Richard G. Elzinga were identified in July 2011	Presumptive finding of death
April 4	Young, Jeffrey J	Private First Class	US Army	1st Battalion, 61st Infantry Regiment		South Vietnam, Quang Tri Province	Killed in action, his body disappeared on its way to graves registration	Killed in action, body not recovered
April 5	Cropper, Curtis H	Lieutenant	US Navy	VF-151, USS Coral Sea		North Vietnam, Gulf of Tonkin	Radar Intercept Officer on F-4B #152325 that caught fire and crashed while returning from a combat air patrol mission, both crewmen ejected successfully but he drowned before SAR forces could arrive	Killed in action, body not recovered
April 6	Brassfield, Andrew T	Staff Sergeant	US Army	RT Missouri, CCN, MACV-SOG		Laos, Savannakhet Province	Killed during an ambush his body could not be recovered as his team evaded the enemy	Killed in action, body not recovered
April 6	Flynn, Sean L	Civilian	Time magazine			Cambodia, Svay Rieng Province	Photojournalist captured while motorcycling down Highway One, believed to have been executed by the Khmer Rouge in 1971	Prisoner
April 6	Stone, Dana	Civilian	CBS News			Cambodia, Svay Rieng Province	Photojournalist captured while motorcycling down Highway One, believed to have been executed by the Khmer Rouge in 1971	Prisoner
April 6	Klingner, Michael L	Captain	USAF	308th Tactical Fighter Squadron	Operation Steel Tiger	Laos, Xekong Province	His F-100D #56-3278 failed to pull up from a strafing run, no ejection observed	Killed in action, body not recovered
April 9	Bushnell, Brian L	Aviation Structural Mechanic Airman	US Navy	VAW-116, USS Coral Sea		North Vietnam, Gulf of Tonkin	Crewman on E-2A that had a fire onboard after launch and crashed at sea while trying to return to the carrier	Killed in action, body not recovered
April 9	Horchar, Andrew A	Aviation Structural Mechanic 3rd Class	US Navy	VAW-116, USS Coral Sea		North Vietnam, Gulf of Tonkin	Crewman on E-2A that had a fire onboard after launch and crashed at sea while trying to return to the carrier	Killed in action, body not recovered
April 9	Knight, Larry C	Lieutenant	US Navy	VAW-116, USS Coral Sea		North Vietnam, Gulf of Tonkin	Pilot of E-2A that had a fire onboard after launch and crashed at sea while trying to return to the carrier	Killed in action, body not recovered
April 9	Pfaffmann, Charles B	Lieutenant (LTJG)	US Navy	VAW-116, USS Coral Sea		North Vietnam, Gulf of Tonkin	Copilot of E-2A that had a fire onboard after launch and crashed at sea while trying to return to the carrier	Killed in action, body not recovered
April 11	Nelson, Jan H	1st Lieutenant	USMC	VMA-311		South Vietnam, Quang Nam Province	His A-4E #152099 crashed due to enemy fire	Killed in action, body not recovered
April 15	Bivens, Herndon A	Corporal	US Army	Security Platoon, HHC, 52nd Aviation Battalion		South Vietnam, Kontum Province	Pathfinder for the insertion of an ARVN unit, he was severely wounded in battle and captured. He is reported to have later died of his wounds	Presumptive finding of death
April 16	Ayers, Richard L	Major	USAF	12th Tactical Reconnaissance Squadron	Operation Steel Tiger	Laos, Savannakhet Province	Weapons system operator on RF-4C #66‑0409 shot down on a reconnaissance mission	Presumptive finding of death
April 16	Rausch, Robert E	Captain	USAF	12th Tactical Reconnaissance Squadron	Operation Steel Tiger	Laos, Savannakhet Province	Pilot of RF-4C #66‑0409 shot down on a reconnaissance mission	Presumptive finding of death
April 21	Wheeler, Eugene L	Major	USMC	VMO-2		South Vietnam, Quang Tin Province	Pilot of OV-10 shot down on an armed reconnaissance mission, both crewmen ejected successfully. The copilot Capt Charles Hatch was rescued the following day but Maj Wheeler reported he was surrounded by enemy forces and it is believed that he was killed resisting capture	Presumptive finding of death
April 22	Golz, John B	Lieutenant (LTJG)	US Navy	VA-172, USS Shangri-La	Operation Steel Tiger	Laos, Salavan Province	His A-4C Skyhawk #148484 crashed into ground on a night bombing run	Killed in action, body not recovered
April 23	Eads, Dennis K	Warrant Officer	US Army	F Troop, 8th Cavalry Regiment		South Vietnam, Quang Nam Province	Pilot of AH-1G #67-15612 that crashed while supporting an emergency night extraction mission	Presumptive finding of death
April 23	Murphy, Larron D	Captain	US Army	F Troop, 8th Cavalry Regiment		South Vietnam, Quang Nam Province	Aircraft commander of AH-1G #67-15612 that crashed while supporting an emergency night extraction mission	Killed in action, body not recovered
April 23	Gomez, Robert A	1st Lieutenant	USAF	497th Tactical Fighter Squadron	Operation Steel Tiger	Laos, Savannakhet Province	Pilot of F-4D #66‑7639 that crashed on an armed reconnaissance mission	Presumptive finding of death
April 23	Lucki, Albin E	Captain	USAF	497th Tactical Fighter Squadron	Operation Steel Tiger	Laos, Savannakhet Province	Weapons system operator on F-4D #66‑7639 that crashed on an armed reconnaissance mission	Presumptive finding of death
April 23	Little, Danny L	Staff Sergeant	US Army	Detachment A-204, 5th Special Forces Group		South Vietnam	Shot and killed while leading a MIKE Force patrol, his body could not be recovered	Killed in action, body not recovered
April 27	Hill, John R	Captain	US Army	237th Medical Detachment, 67th Medical Group		South Vietnam, South China Sea	Pilot of UH-1H #66-17626 that crashed at sea offshore of Quang Nam Province during a medevac mission. All four crewmen evacuated the helicopter but only the copilot WO Donald Study was rescued, the bodies of two other crewmen were recovered	Killed in action, body not recovered
April 28	Snider, Hughie F	Specialist 4	US Army	HHC, 1st Battalion, 77th Armor Regiment		South Vietnam, Quang Tri Province	Drowned while swimming	Killed in action, body not recovered
April 29	Bishop, Edward J	Private First Class	US Army	A Company, 2nd Battalion, 501st Infantry Regiment	Operation Texas Star	South Vietnam, Thua Thien Province	Disappeared during an enemy night attack of Firebase Granite	Presumptive finding of death
May 2	Griffin, Rodney L	Sergeant	US Army	HHC, 2nd Battalion, 34th Armor Regiment		Cambodia, Kampong Cham Province	Passenger on UH-1H #68-16512 hit by ground fire and crashed, he disappeared while evading capture	Presumptive finding of death until 1 October 2015 when he was accounted for
May 2	Price, Bunyan D	Staff Sergeant	US Army	HHC, 2nd Battalion, 34th Armor Regiment		Cambodia, Kampong Cham Province	Passenger on UH-1H #68-16512 hit by ground fire and crashed, he disappeared while evading capture	Presumptive finding of death until 1 October 2015 when he was accounted for
May 2	Richardson, Dale W	Captain	US Army	D Company, 2nd Battalion, 34th Armor Regiment		Cambodia, Kampong Cham Province	Passenger on UH-1H #68-16512 hit by ground fire and crashed, he was killed in a firefight at the crash site	Presumptive finding of death until 21 August 2015 when he was accounted for
May 3	Churchill, Carl R	Captain	USAF	497th Tactical Fighter Squadron	Operation Barrel Roll	Laos, Xiangkhouang Province	Weapons system operator on F-4D #66‑7613 hit by enemy fire and crashed in a river	Killed in action, body not recovered
May 3	Conaway, Lawrence Y	Lieutenant Colonel	USAF	497th Tactical Fighter Squadron	Operation Barrel Roll	Laos, Xiangkhouang Province	Pilot of F-4D #66‑7613 hit by enemy fire and crashed in a river	Killed in action, body not recovered
May 6	Hernandez, Frank S	Sergeant	US Army	B Company, 158th Assault Helicopter Battalion		South Vietnam, Quang Tri Province	Gunner on UH-1H #68-15663 that collided with another helicopter and crashed while laying a smoke screen. The bodies of the copilot WO1 Robert L. Kirk and crew chief Specialist 4 William C. Weiss were recovered later that day	Killed in action, body not recovered
May 6	Worthington, Richard C	Chief Warrant Officer	US Army			South Vietnam	Pilot of UH-1H #68-15663 that collided with another helicopter and crashed.	Killed in action, body not recovered
May 9	Haight, Stephen H	Specialist 4	US Army	3rd Platoon, 191st Assault Helicopter Company		South Vietnam, Vinh Binh province	Passenger on UH-1C #66-15148 which crashed and exploded, no recoverable remains	Killed in action, body not recovered
May 13	Huberth, Eric J	1st Lieutenant	USAF	480th Tactical Fighter Squadron		Cambodia, Ratanakiri Province	Weapons system operator on F-4D #65‑0607hit by enemy fire and crashed on a bombing run, no ejection observed	Presumptive finding of death
May 15	Trent, Alan R	Captain	USAF	480th Tactical Fighter Squadron		Cambodia, Ratanakiri Province	Pilot of F-4D #65‑0607hit by enemy fire and crashed on a bombing run, no ejection observed	Presumptive finding of death
May 16	Conner, Edwin R	Senior Chief Aviation Machinist	US Navy	VAQ-135, USS Coral Sea		South Vietnam, South China Sea	Crewman on EKA-3B #142657 that disappeared en route from Naval Air Station Cubi Point to Da Nang Air Base. The body of the navigator LCDR Eugene F. McNally was recovered	Killed in action, body not recovered
May 16	Skeen, Richard R	Commander	US Navy	VAQ-135, USS Coral Sea		South Vietnam, South China Sea	Pilot of EKA-3B #142657 that disappeared en route from Naval Air Station Cubi Point to Da Nang Air Base	Killed in action, body not recovered
May 17	Westwood, Norman P	Lieutenant	US Navy	VF-161, USS Coral Sea		North Vietnam, Gulf of Tonkin	Pilot of F-4B #152239 that crashed shortly after launch, the radar intercept officer Lt. Kane ejected successfully and was rescued	Killed in action, body not recovered
May 30	Duke, Charles	Civilian	Dynalectron			South Vietnam, Pleiku	Civilian contractor disappeared while motorcycling	Missing
May 30	Mark, Kit T	Civilian	Dynalectron			South Vietnam, Pleiku	Civilian contractor disappeared while motorcycling	Missing
June 4	Wilson, Harry T	Sergeant	USMC	HMM-262		Laos, Xekong Province	Crew chief on CH-46A #153403 that was hit by enemy fire and crashed on a narrow hillside landing zone while extracting a MACV-SOG team, his body was trapped under the wreckage and could not be recovered	Killed in action, body not recovered
June 7	Alloway, Clyde D	Technical Sergeant	USAF	18th Special Operations Squadron		South Vietnam, South China Sea	Crewman on AC-119K #52-5935 that lost power to one engine and crashed at sea offshore of Danang	Killed in action, body not recovered
June 7	Wilbrecht, Kurt M	1st Lieutenant	USMC	VMFA-122		South Vietnam, Quang Nam Province	Pilot of F-4B #151478, hit by ground fire. The radar intercept officer 1LT W Peper initiated ejection, and both crewmen ejected but he was seen to be limp in his parachute. 1LT Paper was rescued by SAR forces	Killed in action, body not recovered
June 9	Elliott, Andrew J	Chief Warrant Officer	US Army	D Troop, 3rd Squadron, 4th Cavalry Regiment	Cambodian Campaign	South Vietnam, Tay Ninh Province	Pilot of OH-6A #68-17359 that disappeared in bad weather on a visual reconnaissance mission. The helicopter wreckage was located on 24 June and the bodies of the other two crewmen were recovered	Presumptive finding of death
June 9	Hilbrich, Barry W	Captain	US Army	Detachment B-2, C Company, 5th Special Forces Group		South Vietnam, Kontum Province	Observer on O-1F #57-2890 that disappeared on a visual reconnaissance mission	Presumptive finding of death
June 9	Ryder, John L	1st Lieutenant	USAF	21st Tactical Air Support Squadron		South Vietnam, Kontum Province	Pilot of O-1F #57-2890 that disappeared on a visual reconnaissance mission	Presumptive finding of death
June 10	Pierce, Walter M	Private First Class	US Army	G Troop, 2nd Squadron, 11th Armored Cavalry Regiment	Cambodian Campaign	Cambodia, Mondulkiri Province	Drowned while returning from a night ambush position	Killed in action, body not recovered
June 17	Cochrane, Deverton C	Staff Sergeant	US Army	Team 52, H Company, 75th Ranger Regiment	Cambodian Campaign	Cambodia, Mondulkiri Province	Team leader killed in an ambush while on a reconnaissance mission	Presumptive finding of death
June 17	Laker, Carl J	Specialist 4	US Army	Team 52, H Company, 75th Ranger Regiment	Cambodian Campaign	Cambodia, Mondulkiri Province	Member of a ranger team killed in an ambush while on a reconnaissance mission	Killed in action, body not recovered
June 18	Drake, Carl W	Major	USAF	421st Tactical Fighter Squadron		Cambodia, Kratié Province	Weapons system operator on F-4E #67‑0297 hit by enemy fire and crashed on a bombing run, no ejection observed	Killed in action, body not recovered
June 18	McLamb, Harry L	Major	USAF	421st Tactical Fighter Squadron		Cambodia, Kratié Province	Pilot of F-4E #67‑0297 hit by enemy fire and crashed on a bombing run, no ejection observed	Killed in action, body not recovered
June 18	Green, James A	Private First Class	US Army	C Company, 1st Battalion, 7th Cavalry Regiment		Cambodia	Killed while on patrol, his body was unable to be recovered	Killed in action, body not recovered
June 22	Earle, John S	Lieutenant	US Navy	VA-172, USS Shangri-La		South Vietnam, South China Sea	His A-4C crashed into the sea after a night launch	Killed in action, body not recovered
June 22	Gumbert, Robert W	Private First Class	US Army	4th Battalion, 21st Infantry Regiment		South Vietnam, Quang Ngai Province	Killed by an explosive device while on patrol, no recoverable remains	Killed in action, body not recovered
June 23	Pederson, Joe P	Sergeant First Class	US Army	595th Signal Company		South Vietnam, Binh Doung Province	Disappeared when the truck he was riding in was ambushed on Ben Cat - Provincial Highway 7B. He is believed to have been captured and died in captivity	Presumptive finding of death
June 23	Phillips, Robert P	Private	US Army	595th Signal Company		South Vietnam, Binh Doung Province	Disappeared when the truck he was riding in was ambushed on Ben Cat - Provincial Highway 7B. He is believed to have been captured and died in captivity	Presumptive finding of death
June 23	Rozo, James M	Specialist	US Army	595th Signal Company		South Vietnam, Binh Doung Province	Disappeared when the truck he was riding in was ambushed on Ben Cat - Provincial Highway 7B. He is believed to have been captured and died in captivity	Presumptive finding of death
June 29	Aldern, Donald D	Commander	US Navy	VA-153, USS Oriskany	Operation Steel Tiger	Laos, Attapeu Province	His A-7A #153176 was shot down on a night bombing run	Presumptive finding of death
June 30	Hill, Gordon C	1st Lieutenant	USAF	469th Tactical Fighter Squadron	Operation Steel Tiger	Laos	Weapons system operator on F-4E #67‑0279 that disappeared on a bombing mission	Presumptive finding of death
June 30	Sadler, Mitchell O	Captain	USAF	469th Tactical Fighter Squadron	Operation Steel Tiger	Laos	Pilot of F-4E #67‑0279 that disappeared on a bombing mission	Presumptive finding of death
June 30	Burgess, John L	Specialist 5	US Army	B Company, 227th Assault Helicopter Battalion	Cambodian Campaign	South Vietnam, Phuoc Long Province	Crew chief on UH-1D #66-16693 hit by enemy fire, crashed and burned, no recoverable remains. The door gunner PFC J Goosman was the only survivor	Killed in action, body not recovered
June 30	Sanders, William S	Captain	USAF	23rd Tactical Air Support Squadron		Laos, Savannakhet Province	Pilot of OV-10A #68-3807 hit by enemy fire on a visual reconnaissance mission, he was apparently wounded and failed to eject. The observer SFC Albert E. Mosiello ejected successfully and was rescued	Killed in action, body not recovered
July 2	Harber, Stephen J	Sergeant	US Army	E Company, 2nd Battalion, 506th Infantry Regiment	Battle of Fire Support Base Ripcord	South Vietnam, Thua Thien Province	Disappeared during a night attack on his lookout position	Presumptive finding of death
July 4	Bookout, Charles F	Sergeant First Class	US Army	RT Colorado, CCN, MACV-SOG		Laos, Salavan Province	Killed when his reconnaissance patrol was ambushed, his body could not be recovered due to strong enemy presence	Killed in action, body not recovered
July 7	Beals, Charles E	Specialist 4	US Army	D Company, 2nd Battalion, 506th Infantry Regiment	Battle of Fire Support Base Ripcord	South Vietnam, Thua Thien Province	Assistant machine-gunner, shot and killed during an ambush on his patrol, his body could not be recovered due to strong enemy presence	Killed in action, body not recovered
July 7	Howard, Lewis	Staff Sergeant	US Army	D Company, 2nd Battalion, 506th Infantry Regiment	Battle of Fire Support Base Ripcord	South Vietnam, Thua Thien Province	Rifleman shot and killed during an ambush on his patrol, his body could not be recovered due to strong enemy presence	Presumptive finding of death
July 21	Schultz, Ronald J	Private First Class	US Army	D Company, 1st Battalion, 506th Infantry Regiment	Battle of Fire Support Base Ripcord	South Vietnam	Medic who fell from the skid of a medevac helicopter from a height of 400 ft while deserting his unit	Presumptive finding of death
July 24	Reed, James W	Captain	USAF	555th Tactical Fighter Squadron	Operation Barrel Roll	Laos, Xiangkhouang Province	Pilot of F-4D hit by enemy fire on a strafing run and crashed, no ejection observed. The remains of the weapons system operator 1Lt. Donald B. Bloodworth were identified in 1998	Presumptive finding of death
July 25	Gregory, Paul A	Lieutenant	US Navy	VF-92, USS America		North Vietnam, Gulf of Tonkin	Pilot of F-4J #155789 that suffered control problems. The radar intercept officer LTJG W Harding ejected successfully and was rescued	Killed in action, body not recovered
July 30	Brown, Donald A	Captain	USAF	14th Tactical Reconnaissance Squadron	Operation Steel Tiger	Laos, Champasak Province	Weapons system operator on RF-4C #66‑0436 lost on a night reconnaissance mission	Presumptive finding of death
July 30	Chavez, Gary A	Captain	USAF	14th Tactical Reconnaissance Squadron	Operation Steel Tiger	Laos, Champasak Province	Pilot of RF-4C #66‑0436 lost on a night reconnaissance mission	Presumptive finding of death
August 12	Brown, James A	Specialist 4	US Army	362nd Engineering Company		South Vietnam, Tay Ninh Province	Drowned while swimming	Killed in action, body not recovered
August 15	Becker, James C	1st Lieutenant	US Army	71st Assault Helicopter Company		Laos, Xekong Province	Pilot of UH-1H #69-15375 shot down while extracting a reconnaissance team, he was killed in the crash and his body could not be recovered due to strong enemy presence	Killed in action, body not recovered
August 15	Schmidt, Peter A	Specialist 4	US Army	71st Assault Helicopter Company		Laos, Xekong Province	Door gunner on UH-1H #69-15375 shot down while extracting a reconnaissance team, he died from injuries shortly after the crash and his body could not be recovered due to strong enemy presence	Killed in action, body not recovered
August 17	Wellons, Phillip R	Major	USAF	4th Tactical Fighter Squadron		South Vietnam, Quang Nam Province	Weapons system operator on F-4E #67‑0312 that collided with another F-4E #67‑0257 during a night strike mission. The other 3 crewmen were all killed	Killed in action, body not recovered
September 5	Hauer, Robert D	1st Lieutenant	USAF	21st Tactical Air Support Squadron		South Vietnam, Khánh Hòa Province	Pilot of O-2A that disappeared during a forward air control mission	Presumptive finding of death
September 11	Plassmeyer, Bernard H	1st Lieutenant	USMC	VMA-311		South Vietnam, Thua Thien Province	His A-4E #151165 was shot down on a night air support mission	Presumptive finding of death
September 13	Miller, Wyatt	Specialist 4	US Army	490th Supply Company		South Vietnam, Danang	Drowned while surfing	Killed in action, body not recovered
October 5	Davidson, David A	Staff Sergeant	US Army	RT Fer de Lance, CCN, MACV-SOG		Laos, Salavan Province	Team leader wounded during an ambush on his patrol, his body could not be recovered due to strong enemy presence	Killed in action, body not recovered
October 5	Gassman, Fred A	Sergeant	US Army	RT Fer de Lance, CCN, MACV-SOG		Laos, Salavan Province	Assistant team leader wounded during an ambush on his patrol, his body could not be recovered due to strong enemy presence	Killed in action, body not recovered
October 8	Ott, William A	Captain	USAF	14th Tactical Reconnaissance Squadron	Operation Steel Tiger	Laos, Savannakhet Province	Pilot of RF-4C #68‑0610 that disappeared while returning from a photo reconnaissance mission	Presumptive finding of death
October 8	Shay, Donald E	Captain	USAF	14th Tactical Reconnaissance Squadron	Operation Steel Tiger	Laos, Savannakhet Province	Weapons system operator on RF-4C #68‑0610 that disappeared while returning from a photo reconnaissance mission	Presumptive finding of death
October 16	Martin, John B	Lieutenant	US Navy	VF-191, USS Oriskany		North Vietnam, Gulf of Tonkin	His F-8J #150289 crashed into the rear of the carrier while making a night-landing	Killed in action, body not recovered
October 18	Strait, Douglas F	Specialist 6	US Army	C Troop, 1st Squadron, 9th Cavalry Regiment		South Vietnam, Binh Tuy Province	Observer on OH-6A #67-16193 hit by enemy fire and crashed and burned on a reconnaissance mission. SAR forces recovered the bodies of the two other crewmen the following day	Presumptive finding of death
October 19	Wilson, Peter J	Staff Sergeant	US Army	RT South Carolina, CCC, MACV-SOG		Laos, Attapeu Province	Team leader of a reconnaissance patrol overrun by enemy forces	Presumptive finding of death
November 3	Day, Dennis I	Corporal	US Army	329th Transport Company		South Vietnam, South China Sea	Passenger on LCU-63 en route from Danang to Tan My port, Huế during Typhoon Patsy (1970), the capsized LCU was discovered the following day near Tan My. The body of one crewman PFC Billy H. Peoples was recovered 3 days later on Cu Lao Island and the remains of Corporal Perry Kitchens were returned in 1977	Killed in action, body not recovered
November 3	Dority, Richard C	Corporal	US Army	329th Transport Company		South Vietnam, South China Sea	Passenger on LCU-63	Killed in action, body not recovered
November 3	Ginn, David L	Private First Class	US Army	329th Transport Company		South Vietnam, South China Sea	Passenger on LCU-63	Killed in action, body not recovered
November 3	Mangus, Arlie R	Private First Class	US Army	329th Transport Company		South Vietnam, South China Sea	Passenger on LCU-63	Killed in action, body not recovered
November 3	Martin, Jerry D	Private First Class	US Army	329th Transport Company		South Vietnam, South China Sea	Passenger on LCU-63	Killed in action, body not recovered
November 3	Norris, Calvin A	Sergeant	US Army	329th Transport Company		South Vietnam, South China Sea	Passenger on LCU-63	Killed in action, body not recovered
November 3	Pantall, James R	Private First Class	US Army	329th Transport Company		South Vietnam, South China Sea	Passenger on LCU-63	Killed in action, body not recovered
November 3	Shewmake, John D	Staff Sergeant	US Army	329th Transport Company		South Vietnam, South China Sea	Passenger on LCU-63	Killed in action, body not recovered
November 3	Woods, David W	Corporal	US Army	329th Transport Company		South Vietnam, South China Sea	Passenger on LCU-63	Killed in action, body not recovered
November 8	Corona, Joel	Private First Class	US Army	C Company, Troop Command, Army Depot Cam Ranh Bay		South Vietnam, Cam Ranh Bay	Drowned while swimming	Killed in action, body not recovered
November 13	Bancroft, William W	1st Lieutenant	USAF	14th Tactical Reconnaissance Squadron		North Vietnam, Ha Tinh Province	Weapons system operator on RF-4C #66‑0420that crashed while making a low-level reconnaissance pass	Killed in action, body not recovered
November 13	Wright, David I	Major	USAF	14th Tactical Reconnaissance Squadron		North Vietnam, Ha Tinh Province	Pilot of RF-4C #66‑0420 that crashed while making a low-level reconnaissance pass	Killed in action, body not recovered
November 14	Klugg, Joseph R	Lieutenant	US Navy	VFP-63, USS Oriskany		North Vietnam, Gulf of Tonkin	The landing gear on his RF-8G #145624 collapsed during launch, he ejected but drowned before SAR forces could arrive	Killed in action, body not recovered
November 24	McIntosh, Ian	Warrant Officer	US Army	A Company, 2nd Battalion, 17th Cavalry Regiment		South Vietnam, Quang Tri Province	Observer on OH-6A #67-16484 wounded when the helicopter was hit by enemy fire on an armed reconnaissance mission. The pilot made an emergency landing and the helicopter caught fire, no recoverable remains	Killed in action, body not recovered
November 28	Smith, Ronald E	Sergeant First Class	US Army	RT Kentucky, CCC, MACV-SOG		Laos, Attapeu Province	Killed when his long range reconnaissance patrol was ambushed, his body could not be recovered due to strong enemy presence	Killed in action, body not recovered
November 30	Stringer, John C	1st Lieutenant	US Army	B Company, 1st Battalion, 11th Infantry Regiment		South Vietnam, Quang Tri Province	Drowned during a river crossing on patrol	Presumptive finding of death
December 4	Green, George C	Sergeant	US Army	RT Washington, CCC, MACV-SOG		Laos, Attapeu Province	Killed when his long range reconnaissance patrol was ambushed, his body could not be recovered due to strong enemy presence	Killed in action, body not recovered
December 6	Taylor, Walter J	Private First Class	US Army	A Company, 156th Assault Helicopter Company		South Vietnam, Danang	Door gunner on UH-1H #69-15184 that crashed into Danang Harbour	Killed in action, body not recovered
December 12	Duckett, Thomas A	1st Lieutenant	USAF	23rd Tactical Air Support Squadron	Operation Steel Tiger	Laos, Savannakhet Province	Pilot of O-2A #67-21428 that crashed on an evening forward air control mission	Presumptive finding of death
December 12	Skinner, Owen G	Major	USAF	23rd Tactical Air Support Squadron	Operation Steel Tiger	Laos, Savannakhet Province	Observer on O-2A #67-21428 that crashed on an evening forward air control mission	Presumptive finding of death
December 15	Deuso, Carroll J	Master Chief Boilerman	US Navy	Mobile Support Unit, Detachment B, Task Force 73		North Vietnam, Gulf of Tonkin	Passenger on C-2A #152793 that crashed shortly after launch from USS Ranger on a flight to Cubi Point	Killed in action, body not recovered
December 15	McCoy, Meril O	Lieutenant	US Navy	VRC-50		North Vietnam, Gulf of Tonkin	Pilot of C-2A #152793 that crashed shortly after launch from USS Ranger	Killed in action, body not recovered
December 15	Owen, Clyde C	Aviation Machinist 3rd Class	US Navy	VRC-50		North Vietnam, Gulf of Tonkin	Flight engineer on C-2A #152793 that crashed shortly after launch from USS Ranger	Killed in action, body not recovered
December 15	Piersanti, Anthony J	Lieutenant (LTJG)	US Navy	VRC-50		North Vietnam, Gulf of Tonkin	Copilot of C-2A #152793 that crashed shortly after launch from USS Ranger	Killed in action, body not recovered
December 23	Booth, Gary P	Specialist 4	US Army	18th Aviation Company		South Vietnam, South China Sea	Crew chief on U-1A #55-3298 that broke up in mid-air on a courier flight offshore of Phu Yen Province	Killed in action, body not recovered
December 23	McAndrews, Michael W	Warrant Officer	US Army	18th Aviation Company		South Vietnam, South China Sea	Aircraft commander of U-1A #55-3298 that broke up in mid-air on a courier flight offshore of Phu Yen Province	Killed in action, body not recovered
December 23	Wiseman, Bain W	Warrant Officer	US Army	18th Aviation Company		South Vietnam, South China Sea	Pilot of U-1A #55-3298 that broke up in mid-air on a courier flight offshore of Phu Yen Province	Killed in action, body not recovered
December 30	Bunker, Park G	Major	USAF	Detachment 1, 56th Special Operations Wing	Operation Barrel Roll	Laos, Plain of Jars	His O-1 was shot down and crashed, he escaped from the crashed aircraft but was mortally wounded while evading the enemy	Killed in action, body not recovered

== 1971 ==
Date missing	Surname, First name(s)	Rank	Service	Unit	Operation/Battle Name	Location	Circumstances of loss	Recovery status
January 3	Holguin, Luis G	Chief Warrant Officer	US Army	61st Assault Helicopter Company (61st AHC)		South Vietnam	Passenger on U-6A #52-25884 that disappeared while flying from Qui Nhon to Buôn Ma Thuột city to collect replacement helicopters	Presumptive finding of death
January 3	Magee, Patrick J	Specialist 5	US Army	61st AHC		South Vietnam	Passenger on U-6A #52-25884 that disappeared while flying from Qui Nhon to Buôn Ma Thuột city	Presumptive finding of death
January 3	Okerlund, Thomas R	Warrant Officer	US Army	61st AHC		South Vietnam	Passenger on U-6A #52-25884 that disappeared while flying from Qui Nhon to Buôn Ma Thuột city	Presumptive finding of death
January 3	Omelia, Dennis W	Warrant Officer	US Army	61st AHC		South Vietnam	Passenger on U-6A #52-25884 that disappeared while flying from Qui Nhon to Buôn Ma Thuột city	Presumptive finding of death
January 3	Palen, Carl A	Specialist 5	US Army	61st AHC		South Vietnam	Passenger on U-6A #52-25884 that disappeared while flying from Qui Nhon to Buôn Ma Thuột city	Presumptive finding of death
January 3	Parsons, Michael D	Lieutenant	US Army	61st AHC		South Vietnam	Passenger on U-6A #52-25884 that disappeared while flying from Qui Nhon to Buôn Ma Thuột city	Presumptive finding of death
January 3	Rhodes, Ferris A	Captain	US Army	223rd Aviation Battalion		South Vietnam	Pilot of U-6A #52-25884 that disappeared while flying from Qui Nhon to Buôn Ma Thuột city	Presumptive finding of death
January 5	Cramer, Donald M	Chief Warrant Officer	US Army	2nd Squadron, 17th Cavalry Regiment		South Vietnam, South China Sea	Pilot of AH-1G #67-16083 that disappeared after leaving Phu Bai Air Base on a night training flight. The body of the gunner SP4 Ronnie V Rogers was washed up on a beach 3 days later	Presumptive finding of death
January 6	Miller, Carleton P	Lieutenant (LTJG)	US Navy	VF-21, USS Ranger		North Vietnam, Gulf of Tonkin	Radar intercept officer on an F-4J #155577 that missed the arrestor wire during a night land and went into the sea, both crewmen ejected, but he disappeared before rescue forces arrived	Killed in action, body not recovered
January 8	Curry, Keith R	Commander	US Navy	VA-145, USS Ranger		North Vietnam, Gulf of Tonkin	Pilot of A-6C #155647	Killed in action, body not recovered
January 15	Harwood, James A	Sergeant	US Army	Detachment B-43, 5th Special Forces Group		South Vietnam, Chi Lang	Disappeared during an ambush while leading a Khmer National Armed Forces (FANK) unit on a training exercise	Presumptive finding of death
January 15	Kinsman, Gerald F	1st Lieutenant	US Army	Detachment B-43, 5th Special Forces Group		South Vietnam, Chi Lang	Mortally wounded during an ambush while leading a FANK unit on a training exercise	Killed in action, body not recovered
January 17	Mirrer, Robert H	Major	USAF	4th Tactical Fighter Squadron		South Vietnam	Pilot of F-4E #68-0288 hit by enemy fire and crashed at sea. Both cremen ejected successfully, but only the weapons systems officer was rescued	Killed in action, body not recovered
January 26	Carter, Gerald L	Lieutenant (LTJG)	US Navy	VA-164, USS Hancock		North Vietnam, Gulf of Tonkin	His A-4F #154930 went into the sea when the catapult failed	Killed in action, body not recovered
January 29	Mixter, David I	Sergeant	US Army	RT Colorado, MACV-SOG		Laos, Attapeu Province	Member of a long range reconnaissance patrol that was engaged by enemy forces, he was mortally wounded by a B-40 rocket and his body was left behind as his team extracted	Killed in action, body not recovered
January 31	Cartwright, Patrick G	Aviation Structural Mechanic 3rd Class	US Navy	VA-195, USS Kitty Hawk		North Vietnam, Gulf of Tonkin	Lost overboard	Killed in action, body not recovered
February 3	Standerwick, Robert L	Lieutenant Colonel	USAF	25th Tactical Fighter Squadron	Operation Commando Hunt	Laos, Savannakhet Province	Pilot of F-4D #66-8777 shot down while dropping sensors on the Ho Chi Minh Trail, both crewmen ejected and he radioed that he was surrounded by enemy forces and had been shot. The weapons systems officer Major Norbert A. Gotner was captured and released in 1973	Presumptive finding of death
February 5	Paul, James L	Warrant Officer	US Army	3rd Squadron, 5th Cavalry Regiment		South Vietnam, Quang Tri Province	Copilot of AH-1G #66-15340 that crashed into a mountain-side in low cloud, the helicopter exploded and caught fire. SAR forces recovered the remains of the pilot W1 Carl M. Wood	Killed in action, body not recovered
February 8	Stewart, Paul C	Chief Warrant Officer	US Army	158th Assault Helicopter Battalion	Operation Lam Son 719	Laos, Savannakhet Province	Pilot of a UH-1H that was hit in the tail rotor, crashed inverted and burnt on impact. SAR forces recovered the remains of the other 4 crewmembers	Killed in action, body not recovered
February 15	Leonard, Marvin M	Chief Warrant Officer	US Army	159th Aviation Battalion	Operation Lam Son 719	Laos, Savannakhet Province	Copilot of a CH-47C #67-18506 hit by ground fire while transporting fuel bladders to a forward base, the fuel bladders exploded causing the helicopter to explode and crash. The remains of the other 4 crewmembers were recovered in 2000	Killed in action, body not recovered
February 15	Taylor, James H	2nd Lieutenant	US Army	159th Aviation Battalion	Operation Lam Son 719	Laos, Savannakhet Province	Copilot of a CH-47C #67-18506 hit by ground fire while transporting fuel bladders to a forward base, the fuel bladders exploded causing the helicopter to explode and crash	Killed in action, body not recovered
February 16	Hoskins, Charles L	1st Lieutenant	USAF	497th Tactical Fighter Squadron		Laos	Weapons systems officer on an F-4D #66-8750 hit by enemy fire and crashed on a night bombing mission	Presumptive finding of death
February 16	Pattillo, Ralph N	Major	USAF	497th Tactical Fighter Squadron		Laos	Pilot of an F-4D #66-8750 hit by enemy fire and crashed on a night bombing mission	Presumptive finding of death
February 18	Berg, George P	Warrant Officer	US Army	A Company, 101st Aviation Battalion		South Vietnam, A Shau Valley	Pilot of UH-1H #68-15255 shot down while extracting members of MACV-SOG team RT Intruder. The helicopter crashed in flames. Another MACV-SOG team RT Habu rappelled into the crash site the following day and gathered the remains of the crew and passengers in body bags for extraction, but RT Habu was attacked by enemy forces and had to extract leaving the bodies behind	Killed in action, body not recovered
February 18	Demsey, Walter E	Specialist 4	US Army	101st Aviation Battalion		South Vietnam, A Shau Valley	Crew chief on UH-1H #68-15255 shot down while extracting members of MACV-SOG team RT Intruder	Killed in action, body not recovered
February 18	Johnson, Gary L	Specialist 4	US Army	101st Aviation Battalion		South Vietnam, A Shau Valley	Door gunner on UH-1H #68-15255 shot down while extracting members of MACV-SOG team RT Intruder	Killed in action, body not recovered
February 18	Lloyd, Allen R	Sergeant	US Army	RT Intruder, MACV-SOG		South Vietnam, A Shau Valley	Member of RT Intruder being extracted by STABO rig beneath UH-1H #68-15255 when it was shot down	Killed in action, body not recovered
February 18	Watson, Ronald L	Captain	US Army	RT Intruder, MACV-SOG		South Vietnam, A Shau Valley	Leader of RT Intruder being extracted by STABO rig beneath UH-1H #68-15255 when it was shot down	Killed in action, body not recovered
February 18	Woods, Gerald E	Warrant Officer	US Army	101st Aviation Battalion		South Vietnam, A Shau Valley	Pilot of UH-1H #68-15255 shot down while extracting members of MACV-SOG team RT Intruder	Killed in action, body not recovered
February 20	Acalotto, Robert J	Corporal	US Army	48th Assault Helicopter Company	Operation Lam Son 719	Laos, Savannakhet Province	Door gunner on a UH-1C gunship #66–700 shot down while providing air cover for a resupply mission	Presumptive finding of death
February 20	Johnson, Randolph L	Sergeant	US Army	48th Assault Helicopter Company	Operation Lam Son 719	Laos, Savannakhet Province	Crew chief on a UH-1C gunship #66–700 shot down while providing air cover for a resupply mission	Presumptive finding of death
February 27	Babcock, Ronald L	Lieutenant	US Army	7th Squadron, 1st Cavalry Regiment	Operation Lam Son 719	Laos, Saravane Province	Pilot of OH-6A #67-16256 shot down on a low-level Pink Team reconnaissance mission, the helicopter crashed and both crewmen were seen to be shot after they escaped from the helicopter. The bodies could not be recovered due to heavy enemy fire	Killed in action, body not recovered
February 27	Mooney, Fred	Sergeant First Class	US Army	7th Squadron, 1st Cavalry Regiment	Operation Lam Son 719	Laos, Saravane Province	Door gunner/observer on OH-6A #67-16256 shot down on a low-level reconnaissance mission	Killed in action, body not recovered
February 27	Lewis, Larry G	Lieutenant (LTJG)	US Navy	VF-21, USS Ranger		North Vietnam, Gulf of Tonkin	Pilot of F-4J that lost power to one engine on a night launch and went into the sea. The radar intercept officer was rescued	Killed in action, body not recovered
March 1	Zubke, Deland D	Specialist 5	US Army	7th Battalion, 15th Artillery Regiment		South Vietnam, Kontum Province	Artillery forward observer attached to an ARVN unit, he disappeared when the unit was overrun by enemy forces	Presumptive finding of death
March 3	Dubbeld, Orie J	1st Lieutenant	US Army	Advisory Team 21, MACV		South Vietnam, Kontum Province	Advisor to the 22nd ARVN Ranger Battalion, killed by mortar fire in an ambush, his body was left behind during the evacuation	Killed in action, body not recovered
March 3	Duncan, James E	Sergeant First Class	US Army	Advisory Team 21, MACV		South Vietnam, Kontum Province	Advisor to the 22nd ARVN Ranger Battalion, killed by mortar fire in an ambush, his body was left behind during the evacuation	Killed in action, body not recovered
March 4	Algaard, Harold L	Warrant Officer	US Army	509th Radio Research Group		North Vietnam	Copilot of JU21-A #67-18062 LEFT JAB aircraft that disappeared on an intelligence gathering flight near the DMZ	Killed in action, body not recovered
March 4	Hentz, Richard J	Specialist 5	US Army	509th Radio Research Group		North Vietnam	Crewman on JU21-A #67-18062 LEFT JAB aircraft that disappeared on an intelligence gathering flight near the DMZ	Killed in action, body not recovered
March 4	Marker, Michael W	Captain	US Army	509th Radio Research Group		North Vietnam	Pilot of JU21-A #67-18062 LEFT JAB aircraft that disappeared on an intelligence gathering flight near the DMZ	Killed in action, body not recovered
March 4	Osborne, Rodney D	Specialist 5	US Army	509th Radio Research Group		North Vietnam	Technical Observer on JU21-A #67-18062 LEFT JAB aircraft that disappeared on an intelligence gathering flight near the DMZ	Killed in action, body not recovered
March 4	Strawn, John T	Specialist 6	US Army	509th Radio Research Group		North Vietnam	Crewman on JU21-A #67-18062 LEFT JAB aircraft that disappeared on an intelligence gathering flight near the DMZ	Killed in action, body not recovered
March 6	Hummel, John F	Warrant Officer	US Army	7th Squadron, 1st Cavalry Regiment		South Vietnam, Khe Sanh	Pilot of AH-1G #67-15464 that disappeared while returning from an SAR mission	Presumptive finding of death
March 6	Milliner, William P	Warrant Officer	US Army	7th Squadron, 1st Cavalry Regiment		South Vietnam, Khe Sanh	Co-pilot of AH-1G #67-15464 that disappeared while returning from an SAR mission	Presumptive finding of death
March 8	Grantham, Robert E	Corporal	US Army	2nd Squadron, 17th Cavalry Regiment		South Vietnam, Quang Tri Province	Observer on OH-6A #67-16645 that was part of a Pink Team hit by enemy fire, crashed and burned, no survivors observed	Killed in action, body not recovered
March 8	Hale, John D	1st Lieutenant	US Army	2nd Squadron, 17th Cavalry Regiment		South Vietnam, Quang Tri Province	Pilot of OH-6A #67-16645 that was part of a Pink Team hit by enemy fire, crashed and burned, no survivors observed	Killed in action, body not recovered
March 10	Smoot, Curtis R	Sergeant	US Army	1st Squadron, 9th Cavalry Regiment		Cambodia, Kratié Province	Door gunner on OH-6A #67-17412 shot down on a visual reconnaissance mission and crashed in flames into a river. The remains of the crew chief SP4 Robert Kiser were recovered by SAR forces, while the pilot WO1 Craig J. Houser survived and made contact with friendly forces	Presumptive finding of death
March 12	Jeffs, Clive G	1st Lieutenant	USAF	614th Tactical Fighter Squadron		South Vietnam, Khánh Hòa Province	His F-100D #56-3415 crashed while on a close air support mission	Presumptive finding of death
March 13	Creed, Barton S	Lieutenant	US Navy	VA-113, USS Ranger	Operation Commando Hunt	Laos, Savannakhet Province	His A-7E #157589 was hit by ground fire and he ejected breaking an arm and a leg. He made contact with SAR forces but they were unable to rescue him due to heavy ground fire, his last radio transmission indicated he was about to be captured.	Presumptive finding of death
March 15	Sexton, David M	Sergeant	US Army	5th Battalion, 4th Artillery Regiment		South Vietnam, Quang Tri Province	Gun Chief on an M109 howitzer that exploded and was consumed by fire, his remains were lost in transit to Graves Registration	Killed in action, body not recovered
March 17	Bauman, Richard L	Chief Warrant Officer	US Army	128th Assault Helicopter Company		Cambodia, Kratie Province	Pilot of UH-1H #69-15664that was shot down while inserting ARVN troops, he was last seen evading enemy troops	Presumptive finding of death
March 17	Dix, Craig M	Staff Sergeant	US Army	128th Assault Helicopter Company		Cambodia, Kratie Province	Crew Chief on UH-1H #69-15664 that was shot down while inserting ARVN troops, he was last seen to be wounded and evading enemy troops	Presumptive finding of death
March 17	Lilly, Lawrence E	1st Lieutenant	US Army	1st Squadron, 9th Cavalry Regiment		Cambodia, Kratie Province	Copilot of AH-1G #69-17935 shot down on a visual reconnaissance mission, ARVN forces found his body but were unable to evacuate it due to heavy enemy fire	Presumptive finding of death
March 17	Scrivener, Stephen R	1st Lieutenant	USAF	19th Tactical Air Support Squadron	Operation Commando Hunt	Laos	Co-pilot of O-2A #68-6860 shot down on a forward air control mission	Killed in action, body not recovered
March 17	Seeley, Douglas M	Captain	USAF	23rd Tactical Air Support Squadron	Operation Commando Hunt	Laos	Pilot of O-2A #68-6860 shot down on a forward air control mission	Killed in action, body not recovered
March 19	Cristman, Frederick L	Warrant Officer	US Army	48th Assault Helicopter Company	Operation Lam Son 719	Laos	Pilot of UH-1C gunship #65-9489 shot down while on an armed escort mission	Presumptive finding of death
March 19	Garcia, Ricardo M	Specialist 5	US Army	48th Assault Helicopter Company	Operation Lam Son 719	Laos	Crew Chief on UH-1C gunship #65-9489 shot down while on an armed escort mission	Presumptive finding of death
March 19	Sparks, Jon M	Warrant Officer	US Army	48th Assault Helicopter Company	Operation Lam Son 719	Laos	Copilot of UH-1C gunship #65-9489 shot down while on an armed escort mission	Presumptive finding of death
March 22	Cleve, Reginald D	Warrant Officer	US Army	176th Assault Helicopter Company	Operation Lam Son 719	Laos, Savannakhet Province	Pilot of a UH-1H #68-15759 shot down while on a resupply mission to ARVN troops, the helicopter exploded and burned on the ground, none of the crew was seen to escape	Killed in action, body not recovered
March 22	Hall, Walter R	Specialist 4	US Army	176th Assault Helicopter Company	Operation Lam Son 719	Laos, Savannakhet Province	Door gunner on a UH-1H #68-15759 shot down while on a resupply mission to ARVN troops	Killed in action, body not recovered
March 22	Knutsen, Donald P	Specialist 4	US Army	176th Assault Helicopter Company	Operation Lam Son 719	Laos, Savannakhet Province	Crew chief a UH-1H #68-15759 shot down while on a resupply mission to ARVN troops	Killed in action, body not recovered
March 22	Traver, John G	Warrant Officer	US Army	176th Assault Helicopter Company	Operation Lam Son 719	Laos, Savannakhet Province	Pilot of a UH-1H #68-15759 shot down while on a resupply mission to ARVN troops	Killed in action, body not recovered
March 22	Moriarty, Peter G	Captain	USAF	615th Tactical Fighter Squadron	Operation Lam Son 719	Laos, Savannakhet Province	His F-100D was hit by ground fire and exploded	Killed in action, body not recovered
March 24	Beckwith, Harry M	Sergeant	US Army	3rd Squadron, 5th Cavalry Regiment	Operation Lam Son 719	South Vietnam, Quang Tri Province	Gunner on OH-58A #69-16136 shot down on a visual reconnaissance mission. His remains were recovered from the crash site, but the body bag fell from the evacuation helicopter	Killed in action, body not recovered
March 25	McDonell, R D	Staff Sergeant	US Army	1st Squadron, 1st Cavalry Regiment		South Vietnam, Quang Tri Province	Killed by an enemy grenade when his patrol was ambushed near the DMZ and his body was unable to be recovered due to enemy presence	Killed in action, body not recovered
March 25	Puentes, Manuel R	Private First Class	US Army	1st Squadron, 1st Cavalry Regiment		South Vietnam, Quang Tri Province	Shot and wounded when his patrol was ambushed near the DMZ, he was left behind when the unit withdrew	Killed in action, body not recovered
March 25	Rossano, Richard J	Private First Class	US Army	1st Squadron, 1st Cavalry Regiment		South Vietnam, Quang Tri Province	Killed by an enemy grenade when his patrol was ambushed near the DMZ. His body was unable to be recovered due to enemy presence	Killed in action, body not recovered
March 31	Salley, James	Sergeant First Class	US Army	Advisory Team 22, MACV		South Vietnam, Kontum Province	Member of integrated observation systems team taken prisoner after Firebase 6 was overrun by elements of the People's Army of Vietnam (PAVN) 66th Regiment. Sgt David F Allwine who was released in Operation Homecoming reported that SFC Salley died in a POW Camp in Laos in July 1971	Died in captivity, remains not returned
March 31	Terrill, Philip B	Specialist 5	US Army	1st Battalion, 92nd Artillery Regiment		South Vietnam, Kontum Province	Member of integrated observation systems team taken prisoner after Firebase 6 was overrun by elements of the PAVN 66th Regiment. Sgt David F Allwine who was released in Operation Homecoming reported that Sp Terrill died of wounds within days of his capture	Died in captivity, remains not returned
April 4	Smith, Joseph S	1st Lieutenant	USAF	612th Tactical Fighter Squadron		Cambodia, Kampong Thom Province	His F-100D was shot down	Killed in action, body not recovered until 3 June 2017 when he was accounted for
April 9	Lilly, Carroll B	Captain	USAF	1st Special Operations Squadron		Laos, Chavane	His A-1H Skyraider #137628 crashed into the ground in low cloud while on an SAR mission	Presumptive finding of death
April 11	Buerk, William C	Captain	USAF	614th Tactical Fighter Squadron		South Vietnam	His F-100D crashed	Killed in action, body not recovered
April 24	Champion, James A	Private First Class	US Army	L Company, 75th Infantry Regiment		South Vietnam, Quang Tri Province	Member of a long range reconnaissance patrol ambushed by enemy forces, after 2 days of battle he left the team's perimeter to get water and disappeared	Presumptive finding of death
April 25	Lemon, Jeffrey C	Captain	USAF	421st Tactical Fighter Squadron	Operation Commando Hunt	Laos, Saravane Province	Pilot of F-4D #66-7616 that crashed and burned on a night escort strike mission, no ejections observed	Presumptive finding of death
April 25	Sigafoos, Walter H	1st Lieutenant	USAF	421st Tactical Fighter Squadron	Operation Commando Hunt	Laos, Saravane Province	Weapons systems Officer on F-4D #66-7616 that crashed and burned on a night escort strike mission, no ejections observed	Presumptive finding of death
April 27	Krupa, Frederick	Captain	US Army	Task Force 2, MACV-SOG		South Vietnam, Plei Djereng	Passenger aboard a UH-1H helicopter for insertion near the Laotian border, he was hit by enemy fire, fell from the hovering helicopter and was last seen lying on the ground	Presumptive finding of death
May 10	Bingham, Klaus J	Staff Sergeant	US Army	RT Asp, MACV-SOG		South Vietnam, Quang Nam Province	Member of 6-man reconnaissance team Asp that was inserted near the Vietnam/Laos border on 3 May. Radio contact with the team was lost on 4 May. The remains of the 3rd American team member SFC Lewis C. Walton were identified in 2006	Presumptive finding of death
May 10	Luttrell, James M	Staff Sergeant	US Army	RT Asp, MACV-SOG		South Vietnam, Quang Nam Province	Member of 6-man RT Asp that was inserted near the Vietnam/Laos border on 3 May. Radio contact with the team was lost on 4 May	Presumptive finding of death
May 16	Crook, Elliott	Specialist 5	US Army	Company A, 101st Aviation Battalion		South Vietnam, A Shau Valley	Crew chief on a UH-1H shot down after inserting ARVN Marines, the helicopter burnt on impact. SAR forces were inserted 8 days later but were unable to evacuate all remains from the burnt wreckage due to heavy enemy fire. The remains of the 4th crewman, SP4 Timothy J Jacobsen, were identified in 2008.	Presumptive finding of death
May 16	Farlow, Craig L	Warrant Officer	US Army	Company A, 101st Aviation Battalion		South Vietnam, A Shau Valley	Copilot of UH-1H shot down after inserting ARVN Marines, the helicopter burnt on impact	Presumptive finding of death
May 16	Nolan, Joseph P	1st Lieutenant	US Army	Company A, 101st Aviation Battalion		South Vietnam, A Shau Valley	Copilot of UH-1H shot down after inserting ARVN Marines, the helicopter burnt on impact	Presumptive finding of death
May 17	Pearce, Dale A	Warrant Officer	US Army	Company C, 158th Aviation Battalion		South Vietnam, Thua Thien Province	Copilot of UH-1H #67-17607 shot down while attempting to extract RT Alaska. He was killed in the crash but the SAR team was unable to extract his body from the wreckage	Killed in action, body not recovered
May 17	Soyland, David P	Warrant Officer	US Army	Company C, 158th Aviation Battalion		South Vietnam, Thua Thien Province	Pilot of UH-1H #67-17607 shot down while attempting to extract RT Alaska. He escaped the crashed helicopter, but disappeared	Presumptive finding of death
May 18	Entrican, Danny D	1st Lieutenant	US Army	RT Alaska, MACV-SOG		South Vietnam, Thua Thien Province	Leader of RT Alaska inserted into the Da Krong Valley on 8 May. On 17 May the team was ambushed and called for extraction, he was wounded and remained behind as the team moved to the evacuation point	Presumptive finding of death
May 28	Chavira, Stephen	Sergeant	US Army	2nd Squadron, 17th Cavalry Regiment		South Vietnam, A Shau Valley	Gunner on an OH-6A hit by an RPG while on a hunter-killer mission. The accompanying UH-1C gunships saw no-one escape the burning wreckage	Killed in action, body not recovered
May 28	Urquhart, Paul D	Captain	US Army	2nd Squadron, 17th Cavalry Regiment		South Vietnam, A Shau Valley	Pilot of OH-6A hit by an RPG while on a hunter-killer mission	Killed in action, body not recovered
June 5	Jones, John R	Sergeant	US Army	Task Force 1, Advisory Element, USARV		South Vietnam, Quang Tri Province	Wounded and disappeared when PAVN forces overran radio relay post on Hill 950	Listed as killed in action, body not recovered until 2012 when his remains were identified
June 14	Wilson, Richard	Private First Class	US Army	523rd Transportation Company		South Vietnam, Thus Thien Province	His truck crashed off a bridge into a river and his body was washed away	Killed in action, body not recovered
June 18	Bidwell, Barry A	Aviation Machinist 2nd Class	US Navy	VAQ-130, USS Oriskany		North Vietnam, Gulf of Tonkin	Crewman on an EKA-3B #147649 that crashed on launch	Killed in action, body not recovered
June 18	Deblasio, Raymond V	Lieutenant (LTJG)	US Navy	VAQ-130, USS Oriskany		North Vietnam, Gulf of Tonkin	Copilot of EKA-3B #147649 that crashed on launch	Killed in action, body not recovered
June 18	Painter, John R	Lieutenant	US Navy	VAQ-130, USS Oriskany		North Vietnam, Gulf of Tonkin	Pilot of EKA-3B #147649 that crashed on launch	Killed in action, body not recovered
June 21	Metzler, Charles D	Commander	US Navy	VF-194, USS Oriskany		North Vietnam, Gulf of Tonkin	His F-8J crashed into the sea	Killed in action, body not recovered
June 22	Strohlein, Madison A	Sergeant	US Army	RT New Jersey, MACV-SOG		South Vietnam, Quang Nam province	Member of a 4-man reconnaissance team inserted by HALO jump. He was unable to join up with other team members and radioed for evacuation due to injuries sustain in the parachute jump. Radio contact was lost and SAR forces inserted the following day found his CAR-15 and evidence of a firefight	Presumptive finding of death
June 30	Bridges, Philip W	Specialist 4	US Army	17th Cavalry Regiment		South Vietnam	Killed with 3 other soldiers when the explosives on the truck they were unloading exploded, no identifiable remains of SP4 Bridges were recovered	Killed in action, body not recovered
July 6	Carr, Donald G	Captain	US Army	Mobile Launch Team 3, MACV-SOG		Laos, Attapeu Province	Observer on OV-10A #67-14634 lost in poor weather on a visual reconnaissance mission	Presumptive finding of death until August 2015 when his remains were identified
July 6	Thomas, Daniel W	1st Lieutenant	USAF	23rd Tactical Air Support Squadron		Laos, Attapeu Province	Pilot of OV-10A #67-14634 lost in poor weather on a visual reconnaissance mission	Presumptive finding of death until March 2017 when his remains were identified
July 15	Taylor, Ted J	Captain	US Army	2nd Squadron, 17th Cavalry Regiment		South Vietnam, Quang Tri Province	Pilot of AH-1G #67-15674 that suffered mechanical failure and crashed into the Quang Tri River. As he was being rescued he fell into the river and drowned	Killed in action, body not recovered
July 18	Aston, Jay S	Warrant Officer	US Army	Company C, 101st Aviation Battalion		South Vietnam, Quang Nam Province	Pilot of UH-1H #68-15671 shot down on an extraction mission. SAR forces were unable to extract his body from the wreckage due to heavy enemy presence	Killed in action, body not recovered
July 24	Antunano, Gregory A	Sergeant	US Army	3rd Squadron, 17th Cavalry Regiment		Cambodia, Kratié Province	Observer on an OH-6A #68-17257 shot down while on a reconnaissance mission. SAR forces confirmed he was dead but were unable to extract his body and that of the gunner SP4 Randall Dalton due to enemy activity, when SAR forces returned the next day his and Dalton's bodies had disappeared. In 1989 the remains of SP4 Dalton were returned, but these were not identified until 2011	Killed in action, body not recovered
August 7	Berg, Bruce A	Sergeant	US Army	RT Kansas, MACV-SOG		South Vietnam, Quang Tri Province	Shot while recovering a M18 Claymore mine from a night ambush position. His body was left behind when his reconnaissance team came under attack	Killed in action, body not recovered
August 10	Bates, Paul J	Captain	US Army	220th Aviation Company, 212th Aviation Battalion		South Vietnam, Quang Tri Province	Pilot of O-1G #51-2267 which crashed while conducting a visual reconnaissance mission and caught fire	Presumptive finding of death
August 10	Dolan, Thomas A	Specialist 5	US Army	101st MI Co, 101st Airborne Division		South Vietnam, Quang Tri Province	Observer on O-1G #51-2267 which crashed while conducting a visual reconnaissance mission and caught fire	Presumptive finding of death
August 18	Kuykendall, Willie C	Private First Class	US Army	Troop F, 17th Cavalry Regiment		South Vietnam, Quang Nam Province	Drowned while attempting to move a vehicle stuck in the Thu Bon River	Killed in action, body not recovered
August 18	Weeks, Melvin L	Private First Class	US Army	Troop F, 17th Cavalry Regiment		South Vietnam, Quang Nam Province	Drowned while attempting to assist PFC Willie Kuykendall	Killed in action, body not recovered
September 30	Bond, Ronald L	1st Lieutenant	USAF	390th Tactical Fighter Squadron	Operation Commando Hunt	Laos, Saravane Province	Weapons systems operator on F-4E #68-0316 that crashed on a daytime visual reconnaissance mission	Presumptive finding of death
September 30	Donovan, Michael L	Captain	USAF	421st Tactical Fighter Squadron	Operation Commando Hunt	Laos, Saravane Province	Pilot of F-4E #68-0316 that crashed on a daytime visual reconnaissance mission	Presumptive finding of death
October 22	Garrett, Maurice E	Captain	US Army	2nd Squadron, 17th Cavalry Regiment		South Vietnam, Quang Tri Province	Pilot of AH-1G #67-15752 that crashed in bad weather and caught fire. SAR forces recovered the remains of the copilot 1st Lieutenant Danny A. Cowan	Killed in action, body not recovered
October 26	Eveland, Mickey E	Specialist 4	US Army	68th Assault Support Helicopter Company (68th ASHC)		South Vietnam, Nha Trang	Crew chief on CH-47B #66-19143 that crashed at sea in bad weather on a flight from Tuy Hoa to Cam Ranh Bay. Debris was found on Hon Tre island, just offshore from Nha Trang and the bodies of four crewmen/passengers were recovered.	Killed in action, body not recovered
October 26	Finger, Sanford I	Staff Sergeant	US Army	US Army Element Vietnam Army-Air Force Regional Exchange		South Vietnam, Nha Trang	Passenger on CH-47B #66-19143 that crashed at sea	Killed in action, body not recovered until August 2022 when he was accounted for.
October 26	Green, Thomas F	Private First Class	US Army	68th ASHC		South Vietnam, Nha Trang	Gunner on CH-47B #66-19143 that crashed at sea	Killed in action, body not recovered until August 2022 when he was accounted for.
October 26	Lautzenheiser, Michael	Specialist 5	US Army	68th ASHC		South Vietnam, Nha Trang	Flight engineer on CH-47B #66-19143 that crashed at sea	Killed in action, body not recovered
October 26	Nickol, Robert A	Specialist 5	US Army	7th Squadron, 17th Cavalry Regiment	Passenger on CH-47B #66-19143 that crashed at sea	South Vietnam, Nha Trang		Killed in action, body not recovered
October 26	Trudeau, Albert R	Warrant Officer	US Army	68th ASHC		South Vietnam	Copilot of CH-47B #66-19143 that crashed at sea	Killed in action, body not recovered
October 29	Oakley, Linus L	Sergeant	USAF	6100th Field Maintenance Squadron		South Vietnam, Cam Ranh Bay	Drowned while swimming	Killed in action, body not recovered
November 3	Decaire, Jack L	Specialist 6	US Army	1st Transportation Battalion,		South Vietnam, Vung Tau	Lost overboard from USNS Corpus Christi Bay (T-ARVH-1)	Killed in action, body not recovered
November 23	Altus, Robert W	Captain	USAF	4th Tactical Fighter Squadron	Operation Commando Hunt	Laos, Saravane Province	Pilot of F-4E #69-7562 that crashed, no ejection or parachutes observed	Presumptive finding of death
November 23	Phelps, William	1st Lieutenant	USAF	4th Tactical Fighter Squadron	Operation Commando Hunt	Laos, Saravane Province	Weapons system operator on F-4E #69-7562 that crashed, no ejection or parachutes observed	Presumptive finding of death
November 25	Thomas, James R	Technical Sergeant	USAF	37th Aerospace Rescue and Recovery Squadron		South Vietnam, Gi Dinh Province	Pararescueman on Jolly Green 70, CH-53 #68-10366 that was hit by ground fire and crashed into the Song Na River. 2 crewmen survived the crash and the bodies of 3 other crewmen were recovered from the wreckage	Presumptive finding of death
November 26	Beutel, Robert D	1st Lieutenant	USAF	497th Tactical Fighter Squadron	Operation Commando Hunt	Laos, Savannakhet Province	Weapons system officer on F-4D #66-7752 that disappeared on a night forward air control mission	Presumptive finding of death
November 26	Steadman, James E	Captain	USAF	497th Tactical Fighter Squadron	Operation Commando Hunt	Laos, Savannakhet Province	Pilot of F-4D #66-7752 that disappeared on a night forward air control mission	Presumptive finding of death
December 10	McIntire, Scott W	Lieutenant Colonel	USAF	17th Wild Weasel Squadron	Operation Commando Hunt	Laos, Mu Gia Pass	Pilot of F105G #63-8326 hit by a SAM while on a Wild Weasel mission. Both crewmen ejected successfully, SAR forces recovered the weapons system officer Major Robert Belli and observed Lt Col McIntire's body hanging lifeless in his parachute from a tree, but were unable to recover his body due to enemy fire	Killed in action, body not recovered
December 14	Boyanowski, John G	Lieutenant Colonel	US Army	Training Directorate, MACV		South Vietnam	Passenger on U-21A #66-18041 that suffered engine failure and disappeared on a flight from Phu Bai to Danang	Killed in action, body not recovered
December 14	Bremmer, Dwight A	Specialist 4	US Army	11th Aviation Group		South Vietnam	Passenger on U-21A #66-18041 that disappeared on a flight from Phu Bai to Danang	Killed in action, body not recovered
December 14	Caldwell, Floyd D	Staff Sergeant	US Army	220th Aviation Company		South Vietnam	Passenger on U-21A #66-18041 that disappeared on a flight from Phu Bai to Danang	Killed in action, body not recovered
December 14	Hollinger, Gregg N	Captain	US Army	Training Directorate, MACV		South Vietnam	Passenger on U-21A #66-18041 that disappeared on a flight from Phu Bai to Danang	Killed in action, body not recovered
December 14	Perkins, Cecil C	Captain	US Army	165th Aviation Group		South Vietnam	Copilot of U-21A #66-18041 that disappeared on a flight from Phu Bai to Danang	Killed in action, body not recovered
December 14	Perry, Otha L	Chief Warrant Officer	US Army	165th Aviation Group		South Vietnam	Pilot of U-21A #66-18041 that disappeared on a flight from Phu Bai to Danang	Killed in action, body not recovered
December 19	Forame, Peter C	1st Lieutenant	US Army	2nd Squadron, 11th Cavalry Regiment		Cambodia, Kampong Cham Province	Copilot of OH-6A #67-16347 shot down on a bomb damage assessment mission. The helicopter exploded in flames and the bodies of both crewmen were seen on the ground but could not be recovered due to strong enemy fire	Killed in action, body not recovered
December 19	Skiles, Thomas W	Warrant Officer	US Army	2nd Squadron, 11th Cavalry Regiment		Cambodia, Kampong Cham Province	Pilot of OH-6A #67-16347 shot down on a bomb damage assessment mission	Killed in action, body not recovered
December 24	Finn, William R	1st Lieutenant	USAF	20th Tactical Air Support Squadron	Operation Commando Hunt	Laos, Attapeu Province	Copilot of OV-10A #67-14667 that disappeared on a night forward air control mission	Presumptive finding of death
December 24	Tucker, Timothy M	1st Lieutenant	USAF	20th Tactical Air Support Squadron	Operation Commando Hunt	Laos, Attapeu Province	Pilot of OV-10A #67-14667 that disappeared on a night forward air control mission	Presumptive finding of death
December 27	Ritter, George L	Civilian	Air America			Laos, Luang Prabang Province	Pilot of C-123K #6293 that was shot down on a flight from Udorn, Thailand to Ban Xieng Lom	Missing until 25 September 2018 when he was accounted for
December 27	Townley, Roy F	Civilian	Air America			Laos, Luang Prabang Province	Copilot of C-123K #6293 that was shot down on a flight from Udorn, Thailand to Ban Xieng Lom	Missing until 25 September 2018 when he was accounted for
December 27	Weissenback, Edward J	Civilian	Air America			Laos, Luang Prabang Province	Kicker on C-123K #6293 that was shot down on a flight from Udorn, Thailand to Ban Xieng Lom	Missing until 25 September 2018 when he was accounted for
December 30	Holmes, Frederick L	Lieutenant Commander	US Navy	VA-165, USS Constellation		North Vietnam, Gulf of Tonkin	Pilot of an A-6A hit by a SAM, the copilot ejected successfully and was rescued	Presumptive finding of death
December 31	Duggan, William Y	Major	USAF	497th Tactical Fighter Squadron	Operation Commando Hunt	Laos, Khammouane Province	Pilot of F-4D #66-7573 lost on a night interdiction mission	Presumptive finding of death
December 31	Sutter, Frederick J	Captain	USAF	497th Tactical Fighter Squadron	Operation Commando Hunt	Laos, Khammouane Province	Weapons system operator on F-4D #66-7573 lost on a night interdiction mission	Presumptive finding of death

== See also ==
- List of United States servicemembers and civilians missing in action during the Vietnam War (1961–65)
- List of United States servicemembers and civilians missing in action during the Vietnam War (1966–67)
- List of United States servicemembers and civilians missing in action during the Vietnam War (1968–69)
- List of United States servicemembers and civilians missing in action during the Vietnam War (1972–75)
- Vietnam War POW/MIA issue
- Joint POW/MIA Accounting Command
- Defense Prisoner of War/Missing Personnel Office
- Defense POW/MIA Accounting Agency
