= George R. Christmas =

United States Marine Corps general

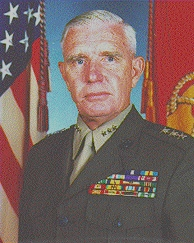
- Lt. Gen. George R. Christmas
- Born: March 11, 1940 (age 86); Philadelphia, Pennsylvania, U.S.
- Relatives: David E. Lownds (father-in-law)
- Military career
- Allegiance: United States
- Branch: United States Marine Corps
- Service years: 1962–1996
- Rank: Lieutenant General
- Nickname: Ron
- Commands: I Marine Expeditionary Force; 3rd Force Service Support Group; 9th Marine Expeditionary Brigade; 3rd Marine Regiment; 1st Recruit Training Battalion, MCRD Parris Island
- Conflicts: Vietnam War: Battle of Huế
- Awards: Navy Cross; Defense Distinguished Service Medal; Navy Distinguished Service Medal; Defense Superior Service Medal; Purple Heart; Cross of Gallantry (South Vietnam)
- Other work: Stone Energy Corporation, Director; Marine Corps Heritage Foundation, President/CEO (1996–2011)

George Ronald Christmas (born March 11, 1940) is a retired United States Marine Corps lieutenant general. Christmas was awarded the Navy Cross for valor in 1968, during the Vietnam War. He served on active duty in the Marine Corps for 34 years, retiring in 1996. After retirement, he served as the president and CEO of the Marine Corps Heritage Foundation for 15 years.

== Early years and education ==
George Ronald Christmas was born on March 11, 1940, in Philadelphia, Pennsylvania. He graduated from the University of Pennsylvania with a Bachelor of Arts degree in 1962. He earned a Master of Science degree from Shippensburg University in 1982.

== Marine Corps career ==
Christmas was commissioned as a second lieutenant in the United States Marine Corps Reserve in 1962 through the NROTC program. After completion of The Basic School at MCB Quantico in Virginia, he was assigned as a platoon leader in Company L, 3rd Battalion, 2nd Marines, 2nd Marine Division, Camp Lejeune, North Carolina. He later served as the battalion personnel officer for 3rd Battalion. While at Camp Lejeune, he was promoted to first lieutenant in December 1963. He augmented into the regular Marine Corps in 1965.

In May 1965, he was assigned to the Marine Barracks, 8th & I in Washington, D.C., where he served as the executive officer, and upon promotion to captain in June 1966, as commanding officer, Headquarters and Service Company.

He transferred to South Vietnam in July 1967, where he served successively as commanding officer, Service Company, Headquarters Battalion, and Commanding Officer, Company H, 2nd Battalion, 5th Marines, 1st Marine Division, FMF. During the Battle for Hue City in 1968, Christmas was seriously wounded and evacuated to the Philadelphia Naval Hospital. For his actions of "extraordinary heroism" in Hue City on February 5, 1968, he was awarded the Navy Cross.

After recovering from his wounds, in October 1968, he was assigned to the staff of The Basic School in Quantico, Virginia; he subsequently attended the Amphibious Warfare School, graduating with distinction. Following graduation in July 1969, he was assigned as an instructor at the U.S. Army's John F. Kennedy Institute for Military Assistance, Fort Bragg, North Carolina.

In July 1971, Christmas was again transferred to Washington, D.C., to serve at Headquarters Marine Corps as the special assistant and aide to the Assistant Commandant of the Marine Corps. He remained in this post until April 1973. He was promoted to major in February 1972.

He returned to The Basic School, where he served successively as the company tactics chief, the commanding officer of Student Company A, and the tactics group chief. From The Basic School, he transferred to the Marine Corps Command and Staff College as a student.

Christmas returned overseas in July 1975 for duty as the operations officer and later executive officer of the 3rd Battalion, 4th Marines, 3rd Marine Division, FMF, on Okinawa, Japan. He transferred back to the United States in August 1976 and was assigned as the commanding officer, Marine Barracks, Annapolis, Maryland. While there, he was promoted to lieutenant colonel in September 1978.

From August 1979 until May 1981, he was assigned as the commanding officer, First Recruit Training Battalion, Marine Corps Recruit Depot, Parris Island in South Carolina.

Christmas was then selected to attend the Army War College, Carlisle Barracks, Pennsylvania, and participated in the Cooperative Degree Program at Shippensburg University, leading to his master's degree in Public Administration.

In July 1982, Christmas served for a year as a naval operations officer, J3 Directorate, USCINCPAC, Camp H. M. Smith, Hawaii, and upon promotion to colonel assumed duties as chief of protocol, USCINCPAC. In September 1984, he was reassigned as commanding officer, 3rd Marine Regiment (Reinforced), 1st Marine Amphibious Brigade.

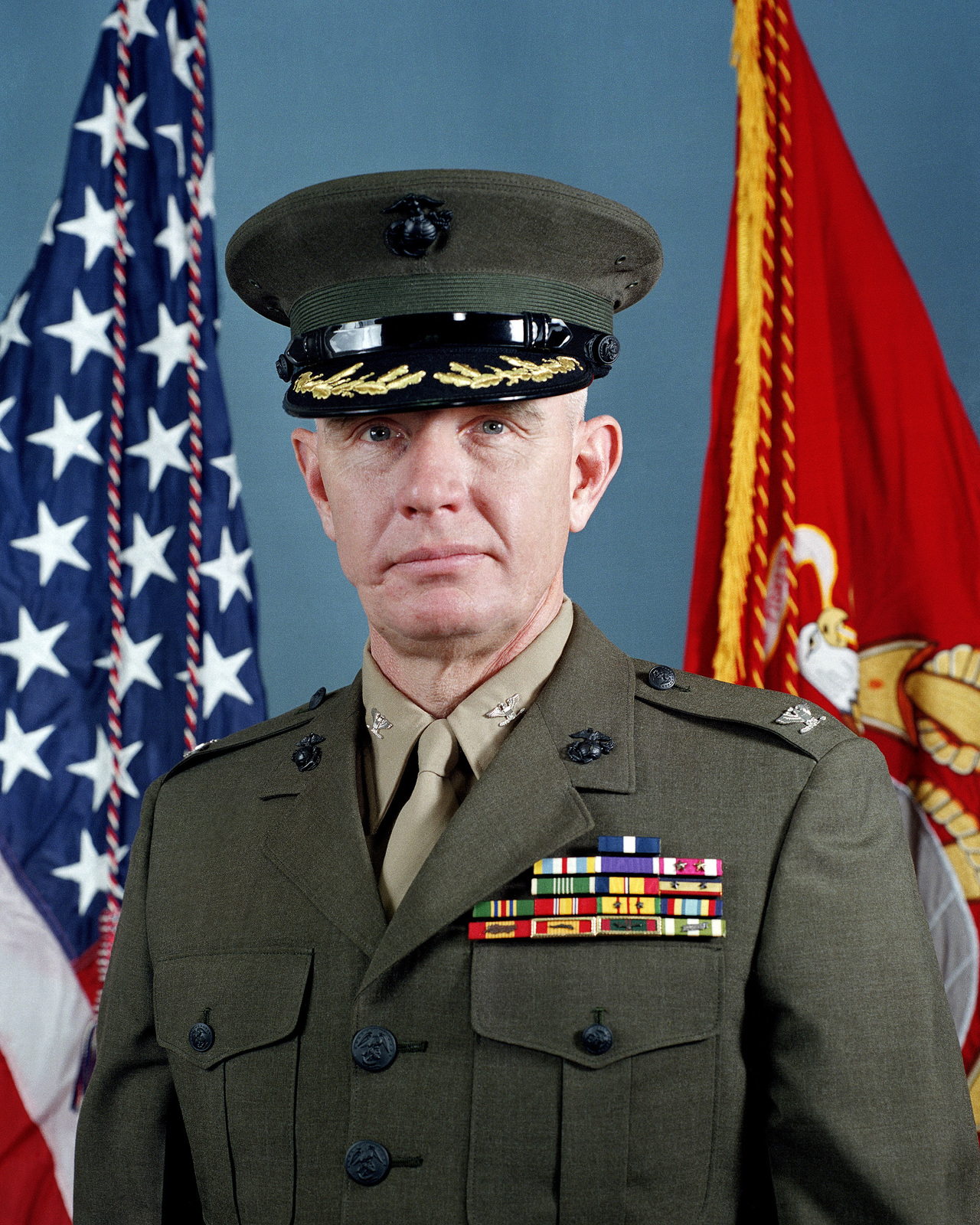
Colonel George W. Christmas, commanding officer of 3rd Marines

In July 1986, Christmas was assigned duty as director, Amphibious Warfare School. He was promoted to the rank of brigadier general on May 13, 1988, and assigned duty as the assistant division commander, 3rd Marine Division, FMF/commanding general, 9th Marine Expeditionary Brigade, Okinawa, Japan, in June 1988. He assumed command of the 3rd Force Service Support Group on August 18, 1989. On May 18, 1990, he again took command of the 9th MEB in addition to his duties as commanding general, 3rd FSSG.

Christmas was promoted to major general on June 27, 1991. He was assigned duty as the director for operations (J3), U.S. Pacific Command, Camp H. M. Smith, Hawaii, on July 26, 1991. He was promoted to lieutenant general on July 8, 1993, and assumed duty as commanding general, I Marine Expeditionary Force, Camp Pendleton, California, serving in this role until July 1994.

On July 15, 1994, Christmas assumed his final active duty Marine Corps post as deputy chief of staff for manpower and reserve affairs.

He retired in 1996 after 34 years of active duty service.

== Post-military career ==
Christmas serves as a director of Stone Energy Corporation in Louisiana. He also serves on the Board of Advisors of Recruit Military.

He served as the president and CEO of the Marine Corps Heritage Foundation (1996–2011). During his tenure, he led the multimillion-dollar fundraising effort for building the National Museum of the Marine Corps.

== Military awards and decorations ==
Christmas's personal decorations and medals include:

	Navy Cross	Defense Distinguished Service Medal	
Navy Distinguished Service Medal	Defense Superior Service Medal	Purple Heart	Meritorious Service Medal w/ 3 award stars
Joint Service Achievement Medal	Combat Action Ribbon w/ 1 award star	Navy Presidential Unit Citation w/ 1 service star	Navy Meritorious Unit Commendation
National Defense Service Medal w/ 1 service star	Vietnam Service Medal w/ 2 service stars	Navy Sea Service Deployment Ribbon	Navy & Marine Corps Overseas Service Ribbon
Vietnam Gallantry Cross w/ palm	Vietnam Gallantry Cross unit citation	Vietnam Civil Actions unit citation	Vietnam Campaign Medal

=== Navy Cross citation ===
Citation:

The Navy Cross is awarded to Captain George R. Christmas, United States Marine Corps, for extraordinary heroism while serving as the Commanding Officer of Company H, Second Battalion, Fifth Marines, First Marine Division in connection with operations against the enemy in the Republic of Vietnam. On the afternoon of 5 February 1968 during Operation Hue City, Company H was attacking a complex of buildings known to be an enemy strong point consisting of mutually supporting bunkers, fighting holes, and trench lines. During the ensuing fire fight, two platoons seized the corner building of a city block, but intense hostile small-arms, automatic weapons, and B-40 rocket fire temporarily halted the advance. Realizing the seriousness of the situation and the urgent need to sustain the momentum of the attack, Captain Christmas, undaunted by the heavy volume of enemy fire, completely disregarded his own safety as he moved across thirty-five meters of open area to join the lead element and assess the situation. Returning across the fire-swept area, he rejoined the remaining platoon, issued an attack order, and then ran seventy meters across open terrain, ignoring automatic weapons fire, and satchel charges striking around him to reach a tank he had requested. Braving enemy fire and two B-40 rockets that hit the tank, he fearlessly stood atop the vehicle to direct accurate fire against the hostile positions until the intensity of enemy fire diminished. Immediately realizing the tactical advantage, he jumped from the tank, and directed his company in an aggressive assault on the hostile positions, personally leading his men in room-to-room fighting until the building complex was secured. In a large measure due to his bold initiative and courageous actions, he provided the impetus which inspired his men to aggressive action and enabled them to successfully accomplish the mission. By his dynamic leadership, unfaltering determination and selfless devotion to duty in the face of extreme personal danger, Captain Christmas upheld the highest traditions of the Marine Corps and the United States Naval Service.
