= David E. Lownds =

US Marine Corps colonel (1920–2011)

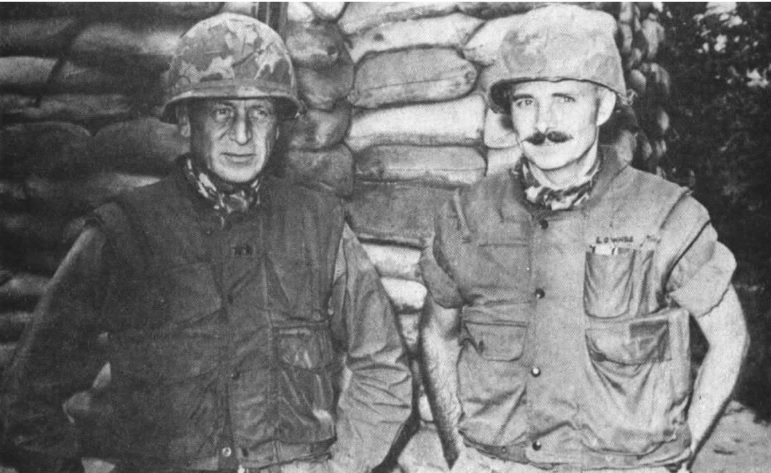
- Lownds (right) with 3rd Marine Division commander Major General Rathvon M. Tompkins at Khe Sanh, 1 February 1968
- Born: October 4, 1920; Holyoke, Massachusetts, U.S.
- Died: August 31, 2011 (aged 90); Naples, Florida, U.S.
- Burial place: Quantico National Cemetery
- Relatives: George R. Christmas (son-in-law)
- Military career
- Allegiance: United States
- Branch: United States Marine Corps
- Service years: 1942–1991
- Rank: Colonel
- Commands: 26th Marine Regiment
- Conflicts: World War II; Korean War; Dominican Civil War; Vietnam War; Battle of Khe Sanh
- Awards: Navy Cross; Bronze Star Medal; Purple Heart (2)

David Edward Lownds (October 4, 1920 – August 31, 2011) was a United States Marine Corps colonel who served in the Vietnam War, notably as ground commander at Khe Sanh Combat Base during the Battle of Khe Sanh in 1968.

== Military career ==
=== World War II ===
Lownds joined the United States Marine Corps on 3 March 1942. He was a first lieutenant with Company B, 1st Battalion, 24th Marines during the Battle of Roi-Namur.

Lownds was wounded while leading Company B, 1/24 Marines during the Battle of Saipan. During the Battle of Iwo Jima, Lownds was attached to Headquarters Company, 1/24 Marines and was again wounded in the battle. Lownds returned to the US following the end of the war, and joined the Marine Reserves on 25 October 1945.

=== Korean War ===
Lownds returned to active duty during the Korean War. He was serving with the I Marine Expeditionary Force when they were deployed to the Dominican Republic aboard USS Boxer during Operation Powerpack in April 1965.

=== Vietnam War ===
On 12 August 1967, Lownds assumed command of the 26th Marine Regiment, which was conducting Operation Ardmore, continued as Operation Scotland, around Khe Sanh Combat Base in northwest Quảng Trị Province.

Lownds led the defense of Khe Sanh throughout the Battle of Khe Sanh, ultimately commanding over 6000 Marines at the base. Lownds was criticised by some for failing to send reinforcements to Lang Vei when it came under attack on the night of 6–7 February 1968, but he defended his decision on the basis that Khe Sanh itself was under artillery attack with a ground assault believed to be imminent and that any attempt to reinforce Lang Vei at night would be suicidal. Lownds' decision was accepted by the US command. Lownds received further criticism when he refused to allow the approximately 6000 Laotian survivors and dependents of the Lang Vei garrison into the base on the basis that it would compromise base security. These refugees were initially housed outside the base perimeter with most eventually seeking refuge further east.

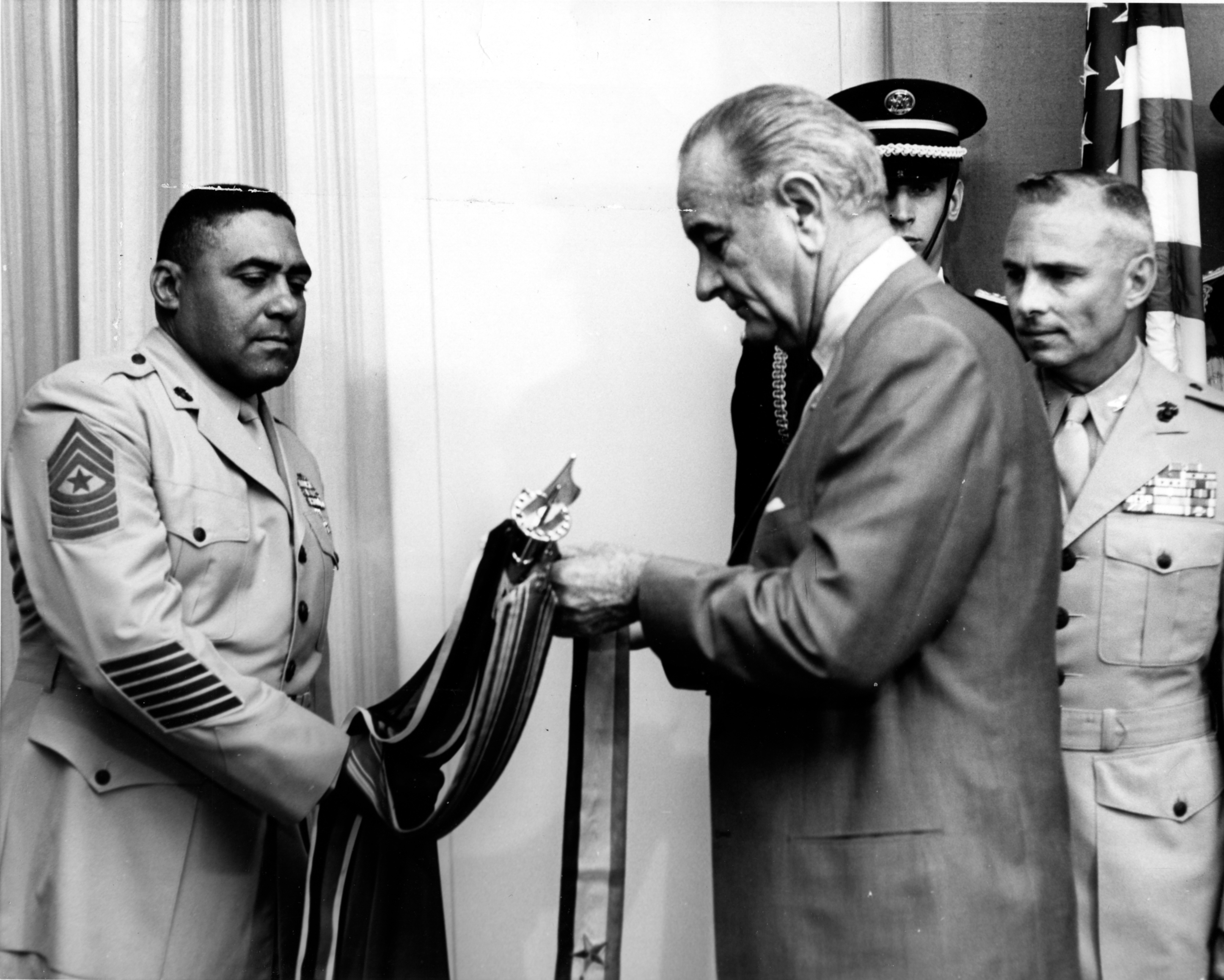
President Lyndon B. Johnson attaches the Presidential Unit Citation Streamer to the colors of the 26th Marine Regiment as Lownds looks on

Lownds was described by Michael Herr in his book Dispatches as follows: "Lownds was a deceptively complicated man with a gift (as one of his staff officers put it) for "jerking off the press". He could appear as a meek, low-keyed, distracted, and even stupid man (some reporters referred to him privately as "The Lion of Khe Sanh"), as though he had been carefully picked for just these qualities by a cynical Command as a front for its decisions... He was a small man with vague, watery eyes, slightly reminiscent of a rodent in a fable, with one striking feature: a full, scrupulously attended regimental moustache... His professed ignorance of Dien Bien Phu drove correspondents crazy, but it was a dodge. Lownds knew very well about Dien Bien Phu and what had happened there, knew more about it than most of the interviewers...The stories published about him never bothered to mention his personal courage or the extreme and special care with which he risked the lives of his men."

Lownds was relieved by Colonel Bruce F. Meyers on 11 April 1968. On 23 May, President Lyndon B. Johnson presented the Presidential Unit Citation to the 26th Marines in a ceremony at the White House attended by Lownds and the 26th Marines Regimental Sergeant Major. Lownds was awarded the Navy Cross for his service at Khe Sanh.

== Later life ==
Lownds died at his home in Naples, Florida, on 31 August 2011.
