= Joint warfare in South Vietnam, 1963–1969 =

Part of the Vietnam War

Joint warfare in South Vietnam 1963–1969
- Part of the Vietnam War, the Indochina Wars and the Cold War
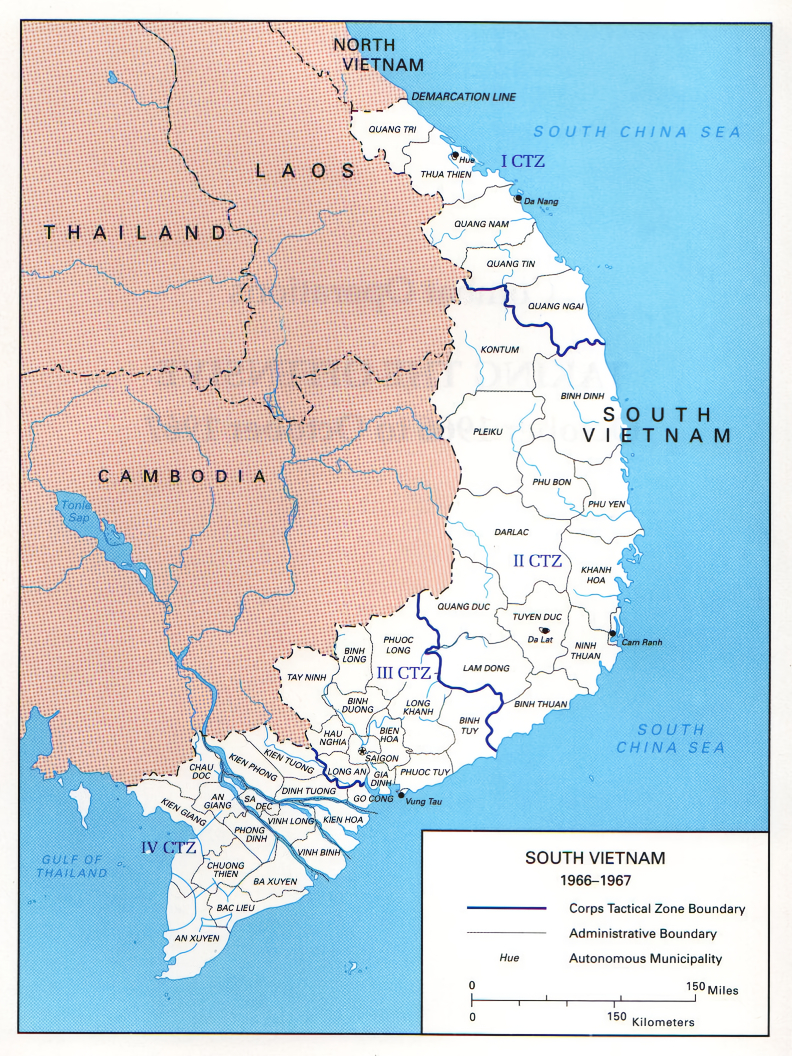
- South Vietnam, Military Regions, 1967
Date	1 November 1963 – 28 January 1969 (5 years, 2 months, 3 weeks and 6 days)
Location	North Vietnam, South Vietnam, Laos, Cambodia
Result	Laotian Civil War, Cambodian Civil War; Beginning of Vietnamization

Belligerents
Anti-Communist forces: South Vietnam; United States; Australia; Philippines; South Korea; New Zealand; Kingdom of Laos; Cambodia (1967–1970); Khmer Republic (1970–1975); Thailand	Communist forces: Viet Cong; North Vietnam (Laos) Pathet Lao; GRUNK (1970–1975) (Democratic Kampuchea) Khmer Rouge
Supported by: Spain; Taiwan; Singapore; Iran	Supported by: Soviet Union; North Korea; China; Cuba; Czechoslovakia; Mongolia; Bulgaria; East Germany; (Polish People's Republic) Poland; Burma; India; Sweden

Strength
United States: 409,111 (1969) ARVN: ~600,000 (1969)	NVA/VC: 420,000 (1969)

Casualties and losses
South Vietnam: 74,416 KIA; United States 47,691 KIA	

During the Cold War in the 1960s, the United States and South Vietnam began a period of gradual escalation and direct intervention referred to as the "Americanization" of joint warfare in South Vietnam during the Vietnam War. At the start of the decade, United States aid to South Vietnam consisted largely of supplies with approximately 900 military observers and trainers. After the assassinations of both Ngô Đình Diệm and John F. Kennedy in November 1963 and the Gulf of Tonkin incident in mid-1964, and amid continuing political instability in the South, the Lyndon Johnson Administration made a policy commitment to safeguard the South Vietnamese regime directly. The American military forces and other anti-communist SEATO countries increased their support, sending large scale combat forces into South Vietnam; at its height in 1969, slightly more than 400,000 American troops were deployed. The People's Army of Vietnam (PAVN, often termed the North Vietnamese Army or NVA by the U.S.) and the allied Viet Cong (VC) fought back, keeping to countryside strongholds while the anti-communist allied forces tended to control the cities. The most notable conflict of this era was the 1968 Tet Offensive, a widespread campaign by the communist forces to attack across all of South Vietnam; while the offensive was largely repelled, it was a strategic success in seeding doubt as to the long-term viability of the South Vietnamese state. This phase of the war lasted until after the January 1969 inauguration of Richard Nixon and the change of U.S. policy to Vietnamization, thus ending the direct involvement of U.S. combat troops via phased withdrawal and giving the main combat role back to the South Vietnamese military.

One of the main problems that the joint forces faced was continuing weakness in the South Vietnamese government, along with a perceived lack of stature among the generals who rose up to lead it after the original government of Diem was deposed. Coups in 1963, January 1964, September 1964, December 1964, and 1965 all shook faith in the government and reduced the trust of civilians. According to General Trần Văn Trà, the [North Vietnamese] Party concluded, the "United States was forced to introduce its own troops because it was losing the war. It had lost the political game in Vietnam." Robert McNamara suggests that the overthrow of Dương Văn Minh by Nguyễn Khánh, in January 1964, reflected differing U.S. and Vietnamese priorities.

And since we still did not recognize the North Vietnamese and Vietcong as nationalist in nature, we never realized that encouraging public identification between Khanh and the U.S. may have only reinforced in the minds of many Vietnamese that his government drew its support not from the people, but from the United States.

== Frustrations and overthrow of Diem ==
The situation in South Vietnam continued to deteriorate with corruption rife throughout the Diem government and the ARVN unable to effectively combat the Viet Cong. In 1961, the newly elected Kennedy Administration promised more aid and additional money, weapons, and supplies were sent with little effect. Some policy-makers in Washington began to believe that Diem was incapable of defeating the communists, and some even feared that he might make a deal with Ho Chi Minh. Discussions then began in Washington regarding the need to force a regime change in Saigon. This was accomplished on 1 November 1963, when the CIA aided a group of ARVN officers to overthrow Diem. To help deal with the post-coup chaos, Kennedy increased the number of US advisors in South Vietnam to 16,000.

== LBJ's war begins ==
=== Johnson approval of covert operations ===
OPPLAN 34A was finalized around 20 December, under joint MACV-CIA leadership; the subsequent MACV-SOG organization had not yet been created. There were five broad categories, to be planned in three periods of 4 months each, over a year:

1. Clandestine human-source and signals intelligence collection from locations in the north
2. Psychological operations against the north to increase tension and division; Colby had already started such operations
3. Paramilitary operations, such as raids and sabotage against facilities that were significant to the admittedly weak economy, and stronger security, of North Vietnam
4. Encouraging the development of an underground resistance movement
5. Selected raids as well as reconnaissance to direct air strikes, with more of a tactical goal than the economic and security actions of category

Lyndon Johnson agreed with the idea, but was cautious. He created an interdepartmental review committee, under Major General Victor Krulak, on 21 December, to select the least risky operations on 21 December, which delivered a report on 2 January 1964, for the first operational phase to begin on 1 February.

=== North Vietnam decides on intensification ===
INR determined that the North Vietnamese had, in December, adopted a more aggressive stance toward the South, which was in keeping with Chinese policy. This tended to be confirmed with more military action and less desire to negotiate in February and March 1964 Historian William J. Duiker has seen the political dynamics of this time as putting Lê Duẩn in charge and Ho becoming a figurehead.

PAVN Colonel Bùi Tín led a reconnaissance mission of specialists reporting directly to the Politburo, who said, in a 1981 interview with Stanley Karnow, that he saw the only choice was escalation including the use of conventional troops, capitalizing on the unrest and inefficiency from the series of coups in the South. The Politburo ordered infrastructure improvements to start in 1964.

=== Late 1963 to 1964 (before Gulf of Tonkin incident) ===
In February and March 1964, confirming the December decision, there was more emphasis on military action and less attention to negotiation. As opposed to many analysts who believed the North was simply unaware of McNamara's "signaling"; INR thought that the North was concerned of undefined U.S. action on the North and sought Chinese support. If INR's analysis is correct, the very signals mentioned in the March 1965 John McNaughton memo, which was very much concerned with Chinese involvement, may have brought it closer.

There were numerous ARVN and VC raids, of battalion size, for which only RVN losses or body count is available. They took place roughly monthly. In the great casualty lists of a war, 100–300 casualties may not seem an immense number, but these have to be considered as happening at least once a month, with a population of perhaps 10 million. It was a grinding war of attrition, with no decision, as death and destruction ground along.

For example, on 23 March 1964, ARVN forces in Operation Phuong Hoang 13-14/10, Dien Phong Sector, raids a VC battalion in a fortified village, killing 126. On 13 April, however, the VC overran Kien Long (near U Minh Forest), killing 300 ARVN and 200 civilians.

=== Command changes and continued actions ===
On 25 April, General William Westmoreland was named to replace General Paul D. Harkins; an ARVN ambush near Plei Ta Nag killed 84 VC.

Ambassador Henry Cabot Lodge Jr. resigned on 23 June, with General Maxwell D. Taylor named to replace him. In the next two days, the ARVN would succeed with Operation Thang Lang-Hai Yen 79 on the Dinh Tuong–Kien Phuong Sector border, killing 99 VC, followed the next day by an attack on a training camp in Quảng Ngãi, killing 50. These successes, however, were offset by the Buddhist crisis and the increased instability of Diem's regime.

=== Post-Diem activity ===
After Diem's fall in November 1963, INR saw the priority during this period as more a matter of establishing a viable, sustainable political structure for South Vietnam, rather than radically improving the short-term security situation. It saw the Minh-Tho government as enjoying an initial period of popular support as it removed some of the most disliked aspects of the Diem government. During this time, the increase in VC attacks was largely coincidental; they were resulting from the VC having reached a level of offensive capability rather than capitalizing on the overthrow of Diem.

During this period, INR observed, in a 23 December paper, the U.S. needed to reexamine its strategy focused on the Strategic Hamlet Program, since it was getting much more accurate – if pessimistic – from the new government than it had from Diem. Secretary McNamara, however, testified to the House Armed Service Committee, on 27 December, that only a maximum effort of American power could salvage the situation. Two days later, the Minh Tho government was overthrown.

==== North Vietnamese buildup ====
PAVN Colonel Đồng Sĩ Nguyên brought in battalions of engineers to improve the Trail, principally in Laos, with up-to-date Soviet and Chinese construction equipment, with a goal, over several years, of building a supply route that could pass 10 to 20,000 soldiers per month. At this time, the U.S. had little intelligence collection capability to detect the start of this project. MACV-SOG under its first commander, Colonel Clyde Russell, was specifically prohibited from any operations in Laos, although SOG was eventually authorized to make cross-border operations.

=== U.S. and GVN covert action planning and preparation ===
Before the operations scheduled by the Krulak committee could be attempted, there had to be an organization to carry them out. An obscure group called MACV-SOG appeared on the organization charts. Its overt name was "MACV Studies and Operations Group". In reality, it was the Special Operations Group, with CIA agent programs for the North gradually moving under MACV control – although SOG almost always had a CIA officer in its third-ranking position, the second-in-command being an Air Force officer. The U.S. had a shortage of covert operators with Asian experience in general. Ironically, Assistant Secretary of State Roger Hilsman, who had been a guerrilla in Asia during the Second World War, was forced out of office on 24 February. (Note: Major General John K. Singlaub, the third commander of SOG, argued that special operators needed to form their own identity: today's United States Special Operations Command has components from all the services, with a regional Special Operations Component, alongside Army, Navy, Air Force, and Marine Components, in every geographic Unified Combatant Command. Post-Vietnam, officers from the special operations community have risen to four-star rank, including Chairman of the Joint Chiefs of Staff, but during the Vietnam War special operators were regarded as outcasts, unlikely to rise high in rank.)

To understand factors that contributed to the heightened readiness in the Gulf, it must be understood that MACV-SOG OPPLAN 34A naval operations had been striking the coast in the days immediately before the incident, and at least some North Vietnamese naval patrols were deployed against these.

Possible consequences of such actions, although not explicitly addressing the OPPLAN34A operations, were assessed by the United States Intelligence Community in late May, on the assumption:

The actions to be taken, primarily air and naval, with the GVN (US-assisted) operations against the DRV and Communist-held Laos, and might subsequently include overt US military actions. They would be on a graduated scale of intensity, ranging from reconnaissance, threats, cross-border operations, and limited strikes on logistical targets supporting DRV operations against South Vietnam and Laos, to strikes (if necessary) on a growing number of DRV military and economic targets. In the absence of all-out strikes by the DRV or Communist China, the measures foreseen would not include attacks on population centers or the use of nuclear weapons.

Further assumptions is that the U.S. would inform the DRV, China, and the Soviet Union that these attacks were of limited purpose, but show serious intent by additional measures including sending a new 5,000 troops and air elements to Thailand; deploying strong air, naval, and ground strike forces to the Western Pacific and South China Sea; and providing substantial reinforcement to the South. The U.S. would avoid further Geneva talks until it was established that they would not improve the Communist position.

It was estimated by the U.S. that while there would be a strong diplomatic and propaganda response, the DRV and its allies would "refrain from dramatic new attacks, and refrain from raising the level of insurrection for the moment."

== Strategic Initiative and Centre of Gravity ==
The U.S/RVN and North Vietnam had strategic goals, with very different, and often inaccurate, definitions of the center of gravity of the opposition.

Lyndon Johnson and Robert McNamara, in selecting a strategy in 1965, had assumed the enemy forces were assumed that much as the defeat of the Axis military had won the Second World War, the Communist military was the center of gravity of the opposition, rather than the political opposition or the security of the populace. In contrast, the North Vietnamese took a centre of gravity built around gradual and small-scale erosion of US capabilities, closing the enormous technological disadvantage with surprise attacks and strategies, while building and consolidating political control over the rural areas of South Vietnam. See the protracted warfare model.

Despite differences in were both sides believe their centres of gravity were, the NVA and Viet Cong would retain strategic initiative throughout this period, choosing when and were to attack, and being capable of controlling their losses quite widely. They were estimated to have initiated 90% of all contacts and engagement firefights, in which 46% of all engagements were NVA/VC ambushes against US forces. A different study by the department of defence breaks down the types of engagements from a periodic study here.

Pentagon Papers, Department of Defence Studies on types of engagements, 1967
TYPE OF ENGAGEMENTS IN COMBAT NARRATIVES	Percentage of total engagements	Notes
Hot landing zone. VC/NVA attacks US Troops as they deploy	12.5%	Planned VC/NVA attacks represent 66.2% of all engagements
Planned VC/NVA attack against US defensive perimeter	30.4%	Planned VC/NVA attacks represent 66.2% of all engagements
VC/NVA ambushes or encircles a moving US Unit	23.3%	Planned VC/NVA attacks represent 66.2% of all engagements
Unplanned US attacks on a VC/NVA defensive perimeter, US Forces surprised	12.5%	Virtual surprise to US Commanders, being well-concealed/alerted
Planned US attack against known VC/NVA defensive perimeter	5.4%	Planned US attacks represent 14.3% of all engagements
US Forces ambushes moving VC/NVA Units	8.9%	Planned US attacks represent 14.3% of all engagements
Chance engagement, neither side planned	7.1%	

=== U.S. views ===
William Westmoreland, and to a lesser extent Maxwell Taylor, rejected, if they seriously considered, the protracted war doctrine stated by Mao and restated by the DRV leadership, mirror-imaging that they would be reasonable by American standards, and see that they could not prevail against steady escalation. They proposed to defeat an enemy, through attrition of his forces, who guided by the Maoist doctrine of Protracted War, which itself assumed it would attrit the counterinsurgents. An alternative view, considering overall security as the center of gravity, was shared by the Marine leadership and some other U.S. government centers of opinion, including Central Intelligence Agency, Agency for International Development, and United States Army Special Forces.

Roughly until mid-1965, the SVN-US strategy still focused around pacification in South Vietnam, but it was increasingly irrelevant in the face of larger and larger VC conventional attacks. Military Assistance Command, Vietnam began to refer to the "two wars", one against conventional forces, and the other of pacification. The former was the priority for U.S. forces, as of 1965, assuming the South Vietnamese had to take the lead in pacification. Arguably, however, there were three wars:

- Ground combat in South Vietnam, including air operations in direct support
- Air operations against North Vietnam
- Pacification in South Vietnam

There were, however, changes in the overall situation from early 1964 to the winter of 1965–1966, from 1966 to late 1967, and from late 1968 until the U.S. policy changes with the Nixon Administration. Nixon's papers show that in 1968, as a presidential candidate, he ordered Anna Chennault, his liaison to the South Vietnam government, to persuade them to refuse a cease-fire being brokered by President Lyndon Johnson. This action violated the Logan Act, banning private citizens from intruding into official government negotiations with a foreign nation, and thus constituted treason.

=== North Vietnamese views ===
While the discussion following splits into military and political/civil strategies, that is a Western perspective. North Vietnamese forces took a more grand strategic view than did the U.S. and South Vietnam with a protracted warfare model, in their concept of dau tranh, or "struggle", where the goal coupling military and political initiatives alongside each-other; there are both military and organisational measures that support the political goal.

Following the Tet Offensive and with US Withdrawal, once the United States was no longer likely to intervene, the North Vietnamese changed to a conventional, combined-arms conquest against the Army of the Republic of Vietnam, and taking and holding land permanently.

== Military strategy ==
Military developments in this period should be considered in several broad phases that do not fit neatly into a single year:

- Gradual intensification, and North Vietnamese exploration of a changed ground environment. Significant events include the Battle of the Ia Drang and the Battle of Bong Son, as well as joint "search and destroy" operations against Communists. During this period, the U.S. concept of the joint war developed.
- A North Vietnamese strategic buildup for what they saw as decisive actions in 1967–1968
- The 1967–68 campaign, which appears to have had a broader concept, not executed, than the most obvious aspects of the Battle of Khe Sanh and the Tet Offensive.

=== The U.S. plans ===
Some fundamental decisions about U.S. strategy, which would last for the next several years, took place in 1965. Essentially, there were three alternatives:

1. Bombing, enclave and rural security, principally supported by U.S. Ambassador to South Vietnam, General Maxwell Taylor (U.S. Army, retired)
2. Attrition of VC bases and secondarily personnel, the focus of General William Westmoreland, commanding general, Military Assistance Command, Vietnam. Westmoreland, in a 26 March message, said that it would take six months for air attacks to take effect, and third-country ground troops were needed immediately. Westmoreland stated "search and destroy" as a goal in May
3. Emphasis on rural security, from a number of U.S. Marine Corps officer including then-Lieutenant General Leonard Cushman, then Major General Victor Krulak, and others

Even with these three approaches, there was still significant doubt, in the U.S. government, that the war could be ended with a military solution that would place South Vietnam in a strongly anticommunist position. In July, two senior U.S. Department of State officials formally recommended withdrawal to President Lyndon B. Johnson; Secretary of Defense Robert McNamara, at the same time, saw the situation as bad but potentially retrievable with major escalation.

Westmoreland's "ultimate aim", was:

To pacify the Republic of [South] Vietnam by destroying the VC—his forces, organization, terrorists, agents, and propagandists—while at the same time reestablishing the government apparatus, strengthening GVN military forces, rebuilding the administrative machinery, and re-instituting the services of the Government. During this process security must be provided to all of the people on a progressive basis.

— Source: Directive 525-4 (MACJ3) 17 September 1965: Tactics and Techniques for Employment of US Forces in the Republic of Vietnam

Westmoreland complained that, "we are not engaging the VC with sufficient frequency or effectiveness to win the war in Vietnam." He said that American troops had shown themselves to be superb soldiers, adept at carrying out attacks against base areas and mounting sustained operations in populated areas. Yet, the operational initiative— decisions to engage and disengage—continued to be with the enemy.

=== North Vietnamese strategic buildup ===
In December 1963, the Politburo apparently decided that it was possible to strike for victory in 1965. Theoretician Trường Chinh stated the conflict as less the classic, protracted war of Maoist doctrine, and the destabilization of doctrine under Nikita Khrushchev, than a decision that it was possible to accelerate. "on the one hand we must thoroughly understand the guideline for a protracted struggle, but on the other hand we must seize the opportunities to win victories in a not too long a period of time...There is no contradiction in the concept of a protracted war and the concept of taking opportunities to gain victories in a short time." Protracted war theory, however, does not urge rapid conclusion. General Dave Richard Palmer suggested that there might be at least two reasons beyond a simple speedup:

- The Politburo wanted to prevent Southern Communist dominance in an eventual victory, so by introducing Northern troops, they could take away that opportunity
- They thought they would be defeated if they did not take decisive action

They may also have believed the long-trumpeted U.S. maxim of never getting involved in a land war in Asia, and that the U.S. was too concerned with Chinese intervention to use airpower outside South Vietnam.

Once the elections were over, North Vietnam developed a new plan to move from the Ho Chi Minh trail in Cambodia, in central Vietnam (i.e., ARVN II Corps Tactical Zone), with a goal of driving through to the seacoast over Highway 19, splitting South Vietnam in half. For this large operation, the PAVN created its first division headquarters, under then-Brigadier General Chu Huy Mân. This goal at first seemed straightforward, but was reevaluated when major U.S. ground units entered the area, first the United States Marine Corps at Da Nang, and then the 1st Cavalry Division (Airmobile), the "First Cav". In particular, the PAVN were not sure of the best tactics to use against the air assault capability of the 1st Cav, so General Mân revised a plan to bring to try to fight the helicopter-mobile forces on terms favorable to the North Vietnamese. They fully expected to incur heavy casualties, but it would be worth it if they could learn to counter the new U.S. techniques, inflict significant casualties on the U.S. Army, and, if very lucky, still cut II CTZ in half. That planned movement was very similar to the successful PAVN maneuver in 1975.

The resulting campaign is called the Battle of Ia Drang, with a followup at the Battle of Bong Son, but Ia Drang actually had three major phases:

- PAVN attack on the Plei Me Civilian Irregular Defense Group camp (CIDG), ambushing the expected heavy rescue force and possibly attracting the 1st Cav,
- Putting simultaneous pressure on Plei Me and Pleiku, so II CTZ would need to call in U.S. reinforcements; this is what became the Battle of the Ia Drang in popular Western terms, but has been called either the U.S. Battle of the Ia Drang or the Pleiku Campaign,
- An ARVN counteroffensive against the PAVN troops retreating into Cambodia, an action fought by the ARVN Airborne Brigade with U.S. air and artillery support.

In the larger Battle of Bong Son approximately a month later, which extended into 1966, 1st Cav drew their own lessons from what they believed the PAVN developed as counter-tactics to air assault, and used obvious helicopters to cause the PAVN to retreat onto very reasonable paths to break away from the Americans – but Americans had silently set ambushes, earlier, across those escape routes.

By late 1966, however, North Vietnam began a buildup in the northwest area of the theater, in Laos, the southernmost part of the DRV, the DMZ, and in the northern part of the RVN.

=== North Vietnamese plans for decisive action ===
It is known that the North Vietnamese planned something called the Tet Mau Than or Tong Kong Kich/Tong Kong Ngia (TCK/TCN, General Offensive-General Uprising) One of the great remaining questions is if this was a larger plan into which the Battle of Khe Sanh and Tet Offensive were to fit. If there was a larger plan, to what extent were North Vietnamese actions in the period of this article a part of it? Douglas Pike believed the TCK/TCN was to have three main parts:

- October–November 1967: "concentrated" fighting methods, with raids against small to medium military bases such as Con Thien or Lộc Ninh, essentially as large raids: "not a decisive battle but a punitive one"
- January–March 1968: "independent" fighting methods, often small, such as the squads that hit the U.S. Embassy. The operational message was that there were no safe areas.
- Something identified in their message against a large target, a "psychological backbreaker" against a target like Khe Sanh, Huế, Kon Tum, or Saigon.

Pike used Dien Bien Phu as an analogy for the third phase, although Dien Bien Phu was an isolated, not urban, target. Losing elite troops during the Tet Offensive never let them develop the "second wave" or "third phase" "We don't ever know what the second wave was; we have never been able to find out because probably only a couple of dozen people knew it." The description of the three fighting methods is consistent with the work of Nguyễn Chí Thanh, who commanded forces in the south but died, possibly of natural causes, in 1967; Thanh may very well have been among those couple of dozen. Thanh was replaced by Trần Văn Trà. Trà's analysis (see above) was that while the concept of the General Offensive-General Uprising was drawn up by the Politburo in 1965, the orders to implement it did not reach the operational headquarters until late October 1967.

Pike described it as consistent with the armed struggle (dau trinh) theory espoused by Võ Nguyên Giáp but opposed by the politically oriented Trường Chinh. Pike said he could almost hear Trường Chinh saying, "You see, it's what I mean. You're not going to win militarily on the ground in the South. You've just proven what we've said; the way to win is in Washington." Alternatively, Giáp, in September 1967, had written what might well have been a political dau tranh argument: the U.S. was faced with two unacceptable alternatives: invading the North or continue a stalemate. Invasion of "a member country of the Socialist camp" would enlarge the war, which Giap said would cause the "U. S. imperialists...incalculable serious consequences." As for reinforcements, "Even if they increase their troops by another 50,000, 100,000 or more, they cannot extricate themselves from their comprehensive stalemate in the southern part of our country."

The answer may be somewhere in between: Giáp indeed wanted to draw American forces away from the coastal urban areas, but tried too hard for a victory at Khe Sanh.

== Fighting continues; 1964 winter offensive ==
Throughout the intensified war, it should be noticed the Vietnamese weather enforced seasonal offensives. Typically, there was a winter-spring offensive, from perhaps November to March, and a summer offensive, separated by rainy or monsoon seasons.

Since MACV-SOG covert operations were small-unit, weather was not a determining factor. started, although these were primarily psychological warfare at first. Planning for guerilla operations in the North and, although no Americans knew the North Vietnamese fear of such, actions against the Trail in Laos were still denied.

The February 1964 attack on U.S. forces at Kon Tum signaled a policy change; the North Vietnamese had previously not struck directly at Americans. As well as raids, terrorist attacks against Americans increased, in keeping with the changed political theory, or, as Truong Chinh put it, to "properly punish a number of reactionaries and tyrants who owe blood debts to the people."

In September 1964, North Vietnam sent a Politburo member, Nguyễn Chí Thanh, to organize the effort in the south. The sending of a headquarters, however, is not obvious. North Vietnamese combat units started deploying in October, but, again, this was preparation. Reasonably, they wanted to know the outcome of the November 1964 Presidential election before assessing the potential for U.S. action.

Both sides, in mid-1964, were misreading one another. On the U.S. side, the Defense Department's Joint War Gaming Agency conducted the Sigma II-64 war game in mid-September, which concluded that the full air attack program proposed by the JCS would not have a major effect. Neither bombing of the North itself, nor of the Ho Chi Minh trail, greatly threatened thinking in the Politburo. Unknown to the U.S., their greatest fear was a major ground operation to cut the trail, which, indeed, would have meant entering Laos and Cambodia. Dong Sy Nguyen, the North Vietnamese general running trail operations, was less concerned with bombing than

What worries me most is that they will send in troops or use choppers to send some commandos or drop paratroopers, who would then occupy a chunk of the trail. This would throw the entire complicated system out of whack.

== Flow of communist supplies ==
North Vietnam received foreign military aid shipments through its ports and rail system. This materiel (and PAVN manpower) was then shuttled south down the logistical corridor called by the Americans the Ho Chi Minh Trail (the Truong Son Strategic Supply Route to the North Vietnamese). At the end of an arduous journey the men and supplies entered South Vietnam's border areas. Beginning in December 1964, however, the U.S. began a covert aerial interdiction campaign in Laos that would continue until the end of the conflict in 1973 (see Operation Barrel Roll, Operation Steel Tiger, Operation Tiger Hound, and Operation Commando Hunt).

== 1964–65 winter offensive ==
In December 1964, the Viet Cong launched coordinated attacks throughout Vietnam, including a Christmas Eve attack on a Saigon hotel (killing two Americans, wounding 58 others) and 28 December 1964 occupation of the Catholic village of Bình Giã 40 miles SE of Saigon. Ultimately seven battalions of South Vietnamese forces were engaged resulting in almost 200 soldiers and 5 US advisors killed.

If the Politburo had assumed the U.S. would not use airpower against the North, they were disabused by the outcome of a 6 February 1965 VC attack attacked U.S. facilities at Pleiku, killing 8 and destroying 10 aircraft. President Johnson, on 7–8 February, responded with the first specifically retaliatory air raid, Operation Flaming Dart (or, more specifically, Flaming Dart I), of the broader Operation Rolling Thunder plan, which had not yet officially started. Alternatively, the North Vietnamese may have accepted the risk of being bombed, correctly predicting that even if ground troops were introduced, the U.S. would not risk the North's greatest fear: large-scale ground operations, beyond the South Vietnamese border, against the Ho Chi Minh trail.

The Pleiku attack seems to have been a vital decision point for the U.S. While the introduction of U.S. ground troops had been discussed for years, there were no specific plans. Bundy's memorandum to Johnson about the attack, on 7 February, did not propose the introduction of combat troops.

Johnson made no public announcements, although the U.S. press reported it. The attack was carried out by U.S. Navy aviators from an aircraft carrier in the South China Sea. Flaming Dart II was a response to an attack on Qui Nhơn on 10 March. In response, initially unknown to the U.S., the North Vietnamese received their first S-75 Dvina (NATO reporting name SA-2 Guideline) surface-to-air missiles, although civilian officials assumed they would not be used. In fact, the missiles were used, setting off upward spiral of air attack and air defense.

It must be emphasized that for most of the war, the bulk of the attacks on the North came, at first, from Navy carriers offshore. When the bombing escalated, they were joined by U.S. Air Force fighter-bombers flying from bases in Thailand. While there were occasional strikes on the DMZ and the southern part of the DRV from bases in the South, especially when South Vietnamese aircraft participated, the U.S. bases in the RVN primarily supported operations there. Da Nang was the primary South Vietnamese base for such strikes.

Bases in SVN, however, were accessible to the VC, by ground attack, or with rockets and mortars of only a few miles' range. As Flaming Dart progressed and the detailed planning for the major air escalation of Rolling Thunder, Westmoreland was concerned about the security of the exposed U.S. air bases in the south. On 22 February, he sent his deputy, Lieutenant General John Throckmorton, to inspect the Marine aviation base at Da Nang; Throckmorton reported that a full Marine Expeditionary Brigade, with three infantry battalions and supporting elements, were needed to ensure its defense. Westmoreland, according to Davidson, believed a two-battalion MEB was more politically acceptable, but submitted that request.

The President approved sending two Marine battalions on 26 February. Other than possibly Westmoreland, they were seen purely as defensive troops. Westmoreland denies assuming they would be available for missions outside the base. The Pentagon Papers suggest he did see a wider mission, but there is no strong evidence that he did; these troops were the first U.S. land combat forces committed to the Asian mainland since the Korean War.

Ambassador Taylor, a retired general with extensive combat experience, objected. His calculation was that one battalion would protect the base from any plausible direct VC ground attack, but that six, not three, battalions would be necessary to establish a sufficiently large area to prevent the VC firing on Da Nang with standard and easily portable 81mm mortars. The Joint Chiefs of Staff disagreed, and forwarded Westmoreland's request, with their agreement, on 26 February.

=== Rolling Thunder buildup, March ===
Shortly before Johnson approved the sustained Operation Rolling Thunder plan on 13 March, the Da Nang security force arrived on 8 March. in response to Westmoreland's request of 22 February reflecting a concern with VC forces massing near the Marine air base at Da Nang, 3500 Marine ground troops arrived, the first U.S. large ground combat unit in Vietnam.

President Johnson ordered Chief of Staff of the Army GEN Harold Johnson to assess the situation, already doubting the air offensive before it seriously began. GEN Johnson reported, in Vietnam between 5 and 12 March, reported back on 14 March. He was seriously concerned about the situation, and proposed external forces be brought in to free the ARVN for offensive action because "what the situation requires may exceed what the Vietnamese can be expected to do." He proposed a U.S. division be sent preferentially to the Central Highlands (II Vietnamese corps area; Kon Tum, Pleiku, and Darlac provinces) or to the Bien Hoa/Tan Son Nhut area nearer to Saigon. McNamara, however, did not think such action would make enough ARVN troops available and preferred that a Republic of Korea division be sent rather than U.S. troops. GEN Johnson also suggested a four-division force be raised under the SEATO treaty and used to block infiltration.

GEN Johnson said a decision was needed "now to determine what the Vietnamese should be expected to do for themselves and how much more the U.S. must contribute directly to the security of South Vietnam." Secretary McNamara noted in the margin: "Policy is: anything that will strengthen the position of the GVN will be sent..."

=== Carrot and stick, April ===
Johnson's main public announcement at the time, however, was an 7 April speech, in which he offered economic support to North Vietnam, and Southeast Asia in general, if it would stop military action. This offer was quite in keeping with his goals for development, the Great Society, in the United States, and was likely a sincere offer. That he saw such an offer as attractive to the enemy, however, is an indication of his lack of understanding of the opposing ideology.

As these proposals were made to the North, on 13 April 1965, joint RVN-US discussions agreed that the ARVN force levels were inadequate. The manning level was increased, to increase RVN infantry battalions from 119 to 150. The new battalions were generally added to existing regiments, to avoid the need of creating more headquarters units. By the end of 1965, twenty-four were either in the field or in training areas.

Director of Central Intelligence John A. McCone wrote to McNamara and others that the ROLLING THUNDER campaign was not a serious deterrent to the DRV, and warned against putting more U.S. troops into combat roles. McCone said that this would merely encourage the Soviets and Chinese to take a low-risk course of supporting infiltration. Khanh, in mid-April, met with U.S. Army Chief of Staff General Earle Wheeler, joined by Secretary of State Dean Rusk, and told them that the war will eventually have to be taken to the North. In April, Johnson changed the rules of engagement to permit the Marines to go beyond static defense, and to start offensive sweeps to find and engage enemy forces.

=== RVN reverses in May ===
A VC unit, estimated to be in two-regiment strength, fought the Battle of Song Be, the capital of Phước Long Province, about 100 miles from Saigon, on 11 May. Much farther in the north, later in the month, they ambushed an ARVN force in the north, near Quảng Ngãi, badly hurting ARVN relief troops and leaving two battalions combat ineffective.

Westmoreland obtained Taylor's agreement on a plan for reinforcement. It had three phases, the first two establishing security for Allied bases and then an offensive strategy, beginning with enclaves on the coast, and moving inland.

1. The first phase extended the security perimeter of the bases so that the facilities were out of range of light artillery. I
2. U.S. forces, in coordination with the RVN, would make deep patrols and limited offensives, still centered on the bases, to pre-empt direct threats.
3. "Search and destroy plus reserve reaction operations."

Westmoreland assumed he would have III Marine Expeditionary Force, the new airmobile division, a Republic of Korea division replacing the Marines in central Vietnam, and the 173rd Airborne Brigade for the Bien Hoa/Vũng Tàu area near Saigon. Early, CINCPAC had objected to the use of the 173rd, since it was the primary strategic reserve for Pacific Command.

== U.S. decision to escalate ==
Westmoreland, in early June, saw the situation as close to collapse without a major commitment of ground troops, in addition to the ARVN. This triggered several weeks of intense debate among the President's close civilian advisers, with McNamara controlling all direct military input to the process.

There were two drivers among the inner circle. First, some, but not all, were fervent believers in the containment doctrine, especially Rusk. McNamara quoted Rusk's direct appeal to Johnson:

The integrity of the U.S. commitment is the principal pillar of peace throughout the world. If that commitment becomes unreliable, the communist world would draw conclusions that would lead to our ruin and almost certainly to a catastrophic war. So long as the South Vietnamese are prepared to fight for themselves, we cannot abandon them without disaster to peace and to our other interests throughout the world

Second, the principals viewed the situation with their own experiential and analytical filters, well articulated by Ball in an oral history interview.

Bob McNamara was analyzing this thing as a man who was trained in quantification, who believed in systems analysis, who believed in application of games theory to strategy, who was enormously persuaded by the disparity in military power... Rusk, it was quite a different thing. He was enormously influenced by his experience during the Korean War. Mac Bundy saw this as a fascinating set of operational problems. I think he assumed that we were so clever, somehow we could find the key hook. For myself, I had a whole different set of experiences. As a practicing lawyer, I had had among my clients various agencies of the French government when they went through the Indo-Chinese experience. I had heard everything before.

Johnson gave the go-ahead in July, but then sent McNamara and others to study actions further.

=== May and June combat ===
Mid-May saw a new series of Communist offensives, all over the country. Much of the action was in Phước Long Province, 50 miles northeast of Saigon near the Cambodian border. Its capital, Songbe, was overrun. Song Be was primarily defended by irregular ARVN units, although supported by a Special Forces team and several miscellaneous units. An unprecedented amount of air support, including the first use of a company-sized armed helicopter unit, allowed a successful defense. Higher command, however, was concern that this large a VC unit could take an initiative.

On 10 June, the VC made another two-regiment attack on Đồng Xoài, north of Saigon, using one regiment against the town and Special Forces camp, while preparing an ambush for an ARVN relief force with the other. ARVN leadership disintegrated, and, contrary to policy, American advisers took command. The VC ambushes were extremely effective against ARVN relief forces, which were committed one battalion at a time, until the ARVN ran out of reserves. Among the forces destroyed was the 7th Airborne Battalion, one of the best units in the ARVN.

=== The 44 battalion request ===
Westmoreland, on 7 June, sent a message to CINCPAC that a VC summer offensive was underway, not yet at its full potential, both to destroy RVN forces and isolate (but not hold) key towns. He doubted the South Vietnamese capability to cope, largely due to recent troop losses. To prevent what he called collapse, he wanted to double the size of his forces, with 34 U.S. and 10 South Korean battalions comprising 175,000 men; thus the message has been called the "44 battalion request." The State Department's Bureau of Intelligence and Research disagreed with the MACV assessment of near-collapse.

Even then, he told Lyndon Johnson, they would be a stopgap, with at least 100,000 more needed in 1966. For Johnson, it was a choice between deeper involvement or defeat. McNamara said this cable was the most disturbing of the war; it forced a major decision and discussions with the President on the 9th and 10th. In a telephone conversation afterwards, McNamara told Johnson that he personally had limitations in mind, but he did not think that the Joint Chiefs of Staff had them. Still, McNamara briefed the press on the 16th. Polls supported the escalation, and, when asked for his advice, Dwight D. Eisenhower agreed that the reinforcements should be sent.

=== Discussion before decision ===
Considerable internal discussion took place among the President's key civilian advisers, with the main four papers presented to Johnson on 1 July, with a covering memo from Assistant to the President for National Security Affairs, McGeorge Bundy. George Ball was the most strongly opposed to escalation. Ball had been, since October 1964, sending Johnson memoranda saying "we should cut our losses."

William Bundy ruled out withdrawal, but did not think escalation would help, unless the ARVN did netter; he was concerned that too large an intervention would create a "white man's war", with the U.S. replaying the role of the French in the endgame in Indochina. Ball, in his oral history interview, deprecated William Bundy's influence, "he was not one of the top three or four people that were always talking to the President about these things."

It is clear that no military personnel were part of the inner circle of discussion, but there are different descriptions of the degree to which they were consulted. McNamara said "I spent countless hours with the Joint Chiefs" debating Westmoreland's thinking. McNamara did have a small staff group, headed by John McNaughton, who obtained technical assistance from the Joint Staff, but did not have participation from the JCS proper. McMaster, however, cites George Ball as saying that McNamara lied to the Chairman of the Joint Chiefs of Staff, Earle Wheeler, to ensure that Wheeler did not attend the meeting when the Ball and McNamara drafts were reviewed.

Congress, as an institution, also was not consulted. Johnson believed the Gulf of Tonkin Resolution gave him all the authority he needed, and, indeed, Senators both opposed and supporting the escalation did not believe it was a proper matter for Congressional debate. Much later, McNamara wrote that it was wrong not to have that debate, even if it encouraged the enemy.

== Decision and worry ==
Before the 1 July 1965 presentation to Johnson, McGeorge Bundy suggested that he "listen hard to George Ball and then reject his proposal", and pick between McNamara's and William Bundy's recommendations; McNamara would "tone down" his recommendations.

At Defense, McNamara agreed the situation was worse, but believed the situation might be retrieved: "The situation in SVN is worse than a year ago (when it was worse than a year before that). After a few months of stalemate, the tempo of the war has quickened. . . . The central highlands could well be lost to the NLF during this monsoon season. Since 1 June, the GVN has been forced to abandon six district capitals; only one has been retaken...The odds are less than even that the Ky government will last out the year. Ky is "executive agent" for a directorate of generals."

McNamara also observed that the Administration's approach to air war against the North, Rolling Thunder, had not "produced tangible evidence of willingness on the part of Hanoi to come to the conference table in a reasonable mood. The DRV/VC seem to believe that SVN is on the run and near collapse; they show no signs of settling for less than complete takeover."

== The "other war" ==
1966 was the year of considerable improvement of command relationships, still under Westmoreland, for what Westmoreland considered the less interesting "other war" of rural development. There were frequent changes of names of aspects of this mission, starting in 1964, but eventually, the GVN and US agreed on the term Revolutionary Development (RD), which was to continue in a variety of development activities. The term, apparently coined by Premier and general Nguyễn Cao Kỳ, was agreed to be defined as

RD is the integrated military and civil process to restore, consolidate and expand government control so that nation building can progress throughout the Republic of Vietnam. It consists of those coordinated military and civil actions to liberate the people from Viet Cong control; restore public security; initiate political, economic and social development; extend effective Government of Vietnam authority; and win the willing support of people toward these ends.

"Search and Destroy" gave way after 1968 to "clear and hold", when Creighton Abrams replaced Westmoreland.

Westmoreland was principally interested only in covert military operations, while Abrams looked at a broader picture. MACV advisors did work closely with 900,000 local GVN officials in a well-organized pacification program called CORDS (Civil Operations and Revolutionary Development.) It stressed technical aid, local self-government, and land distribution to peasant farmers. A majority of tenant farmers received title to their own land in one of the most successful transfer projects in any nation. On the other hand, hundreds of thousands of peasants entered squalid refugee camps when CORDS moved them out of villages that could not be protected.

In the Phoenix Program (part of CORDS with a strong CIA component) GVN police identified and arrested (and sometimes killed) the NLF secret police agents engaged in assassination.

=== 1965–66 winter–spring offensive ===
There was an increasing intensity to use air power in Cambodia and Laos, accelerating in July. In some, but not all cases, the Cambodian or Laotian governments were secretly consulted, but in other cases, U.S. aircraft, especially B-52 bombers acted at direct U.S.

VC attacks ranged in size from local bombings to multi-regimental operations, and use of longer-range artillery.

The Battle of Ia Drang, beginning in November 1965, was a response to the start of the 1965–66 Communist winter-spring offensive; the Battle of Bong Son was effectively a continuation a month later. These were significant for a variety of reasons, first because the Communists first used a division-sized organization in conventional warfare, and second the U.S. first used true airmobile forces, also in division strength, in response. The Ia Drang also involved the first use of B-52 bombers integrated into a tactical plan, rather than on independent ARC LIGHT missions.

Starting on 20 December 1965, the non-Communist forces held an 84-hour ceasefire for Tet, which was the culmination of a psychological warfare program to encourage Communist defections under the Chieu Hoi program. MACV announced 106 Communist violations of the truce.

Starting in mid-February 1966, patrols detected indications of a pending VC attack against the A Shau Special Forces camp, whose mission was surveillance of infiltration from the nearby Laotian border. Continuous attacks on 9–10 March overran the camp, with a disorderly retreat losing several helicopters and resulting in a number of friendly personnel missing in action.

=== Winter–spring 1967 ===
To act before the 1966–67 Communist offensive, Operation Attleboro, starting in November 1965, was the first of many "search and destroy" missions launched by the U.S., such as Operation Junction City and Operation Cedar Falls

In 1967, the NVA organization in the northwest was under two Military Regions (MR), MR-4 north and south of the DMZ, and MR-5 (also known as MR-S) for Communist units in the northern part of South Vietnam. Essentially, the MR-4 command was conventional while MR-5 was guerilla. MR-4 commanded five divisions north of the DMZ, three operational, one reserve, and one recovering from battle.

==== Political situation in South Vietnam ====
In Saigon, the political situation began to calm in 1967, with the rise of Nguyễn Văn Thiệu to the head of the South Vietnamese government. Thieu's ascent to the presidency stabilized the government and ended a long series of military juntas that had administered the country since Diem's removal. Despite this, the Americanization of the war clearly showed that the South Vietnamese were incapable of defending the country on their own.

==== See-saw conflict ====
Laos and Cambodia also had their own indigenous communist insurgencies to deal with. These regular government forces were supported by the CIA and the bombs of the United States Air Force. Believing that the triumph of communism in Vietnam was inevitable, Norodom Sihanouk made a deal with the Chinese in 1965 that allowed North Vietnamese forces to establish permanent bases in his country and to use the port of Sihanoukville for delivery of military supplies in exchange for payments and a proportion of the arms.

In mid-1967, with United States troop levels close to the half million mark, Westmoreland requested 80,000 additional troops for immediate needs and indicated that further requests were being contemplated. United States forces in Tây Ninh, Bình Định, Quảng Ngãi, and Dinh Tuong provinces had initiated major offensives in late 1966 and in early 1967, and more troops were needed to support these and other planned operations. As a result of these deployments, United States forces were scattered from the DMZ to the Mekong Delta by mid-1967. Opposition to the war, meanwhile, was mounting in the United States; and among the Vietnamese facing one another in the South, the rising cost of men and resources was beginning to take its toll on both sides. The level of PLAF volunteers declined to less than 50 percent in 1967 and desertions rose, resulting in an even greater increase in northern troop participation. Morale declined among communist sympathizers and Saigon government supporters alike. In elections held in South Vietnam in September 1967, former generals Nguyễn Văn Thiệu and Nguyen Cao Ky were elected president and vice president, respectively. A number of popular candidates, including Buddhists and peace candidates, were barred from running, and newspapers were largely suppressed during the campaign. Even so, the military candidates received less than 35 percent of the vote, although the election took place only in areas under the Saigon government's control. When proof of widespread election fraud was produced by the defeated candidates, students and Buddhists demonstrated and demanded that the elections be annulled.

Late in 1967, Westmoreland said that it was conceivable that in two years or less U.S. forces could be phased out of the war, turning over more and more of the fighting to the ARVN. He should have known better. This readiness of the enemy to remain fixed in place inspired MACV to send reinforcements from other sectors of South Vietnam.

Most of the PAVN/NLF operational capability was possible only because of the unhindered movement of men along the Hồ Chí Minh Trail. Indeed, the PAVN was doing just that. MACV used this opportunity to field its latest technology against the PAVN.

=== 1968 North Vietnamese offensive ===
1968 began with the Tet Offensive, which caused immense Communist losses.

By mid-January 1968, III MAF was the size of a U.S. corps, consisting of what amounted to two Army divisions, two reinforced Marine Divisions, a Marine aircraft wing, and supporting forces, numbering well over 100,000. GEN Westmoreland believed that Marine LTG Robert E. Cushman Jr., who had relieved General Walt, was "unduly complacent." worried about what he perceived as the Marine command's "lack of followup in supervision", its employment of helicopters, and its generalship. Westmoreland sent his deputy Creighton Abrams to take command of I Corps, and gave his Air Force commander control of Marine aviation. The Marines protested vehemently but were rebuffed by the Joint Chiefs of Staff.

Marine Lieutenant General Victor Krulak devotes Chapter 13 of his memoirs to the dispute. Brigadier General Douglas Kinnard also discusses the tension.

General Cushman, formerly the III Marine Amphibious Corps commander in Vietnam and, in 1969, Commandant of the Marine Corps, said "I felt, and I think that most Marines felt, that the time had come to get out of Vietnam."

Subsequent actions in April and May were more holding actions than anything decisive; again, the goal may have been simply to pin forces while affecting American public opinion and politics. The North Vietnamese 320th Division fought the U.S. 3rd Marine Division i the area north of Dong Ha, resulting in heavy NVA casualties.

A second assault on Saigon, complete with rocket attacks, was launched in May. Through these and other attacks in the spring and summer of 1968, the Communists kept up pressure on the battlefield in order to strengthen their position in a projected a series of four-party peace talks scheduled to begin in January 1969 that called for representatives of the United States, South Vietnam, North Vietnam, and the National Liberation Front to meet in Paris.

=== Summer 1968 ===
Starting in June, Marine operations made more extensive use of artillery fire support bases, a variant on typical Marine Air-Ground Task Force doctrine that tends to use air rather than substantial artillery. The 3rd would usually colocate an infantry battalion command post with the firebase, from which the infantry companies would move by foot or helicopter.

The 320th, in August, again moved against the 3rd, south of the Bến Hải River and north of Route 9, between Cam Lo and the Rockpile.

=== Winter 1968–69 ===
North Vietnamese actions certainly were dependent on the result of the U.S. 1968 Presidential election, and what they saw as a new environment under Nixon. Several factors caused change in U.S. strategy:

- There was no plausible way of inflicting a decisive defeat with the politically plausible forces
- Communist forces had taken massive casualties
- The South Vietnamese were better mobilized and organized than ever before.

== Aftermath and scaling back of American involvement ==
The Nixon Administration embarked upon a policy of "Vietnamization", or turning over ground combat to the South Vietnamese. Despite the name, significant numbers of American troops continued to fight in Vietnam in 1969 and onward; the scaling back was gradual, and the US continued to support South Vietnam heavily in supplies and with air power.

The Tet offensive is widely viewed as a turning point in the war despite the high cost to the communists (approximately 32,000 killed and about 5,800 captured) for what appeared at the time to be small gains. Although they managed to retain control of some of the rural areas, the communists were forced out of all of the towns and cities, except Huế, within a few weeks. Nevertheless, the offensive emphasized to the Johnson administration that victory in Vietnam would require a greater commitment of men and resources than the American people were willing to invest. The American public was shocked and dismayed; for the newly anti-war side, they realized that the American military command had been dangerously overoptimistic in its appraisal of the situation in Vietnam, and dishonest in their reports to the public. For the pro-war side, the Tet Offensive was proof that the military was being "held back" from winning. The Tet Offensive came to embody the growing credibility gap at the heart of U.S. government statements.
