= Operation Commando Hunt =

Part of the Vietnam War (1968–1972)

- Part of the Vietnam War
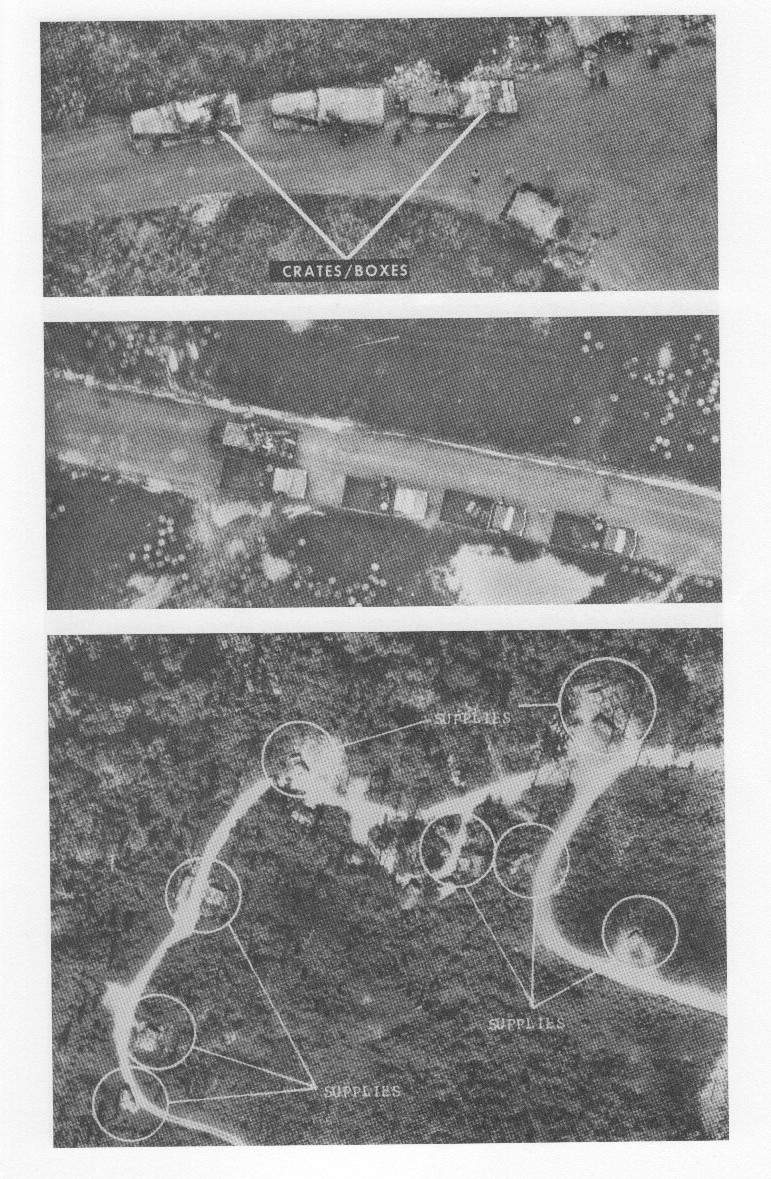
- Targets: (top) loaded PAVN trucks, (mid) POL storage area, (bot) open supply storage area
| Date | 15 November 1968 – 29 March 1972 |
| Location | Southeastern Laos |
| Result | Strategic US failure |

Belligerents
| United States, South Vietnam; Thailand (Kingdom of Laos) Laos | North Vietnam |

Commanders and leaders
| | (North Vietnam) Đồng Sĩ Nguyên |

Operation Commando Hunt was a covert U.S. Seventh Air Force and U.S. Navy Task Force 77 aerial interdiction campaign that took place during the Vietnam War. The operation began on 15 November 1968 and ended on 29 March 1972. The objective of the campaign was to prevent the transit of People's Army of Vietnam (PAVN) personnel and supplies on the logistical corridor known as the Ho Chi Minh Trail (the Truong Son Road to the North Vietnamese) that ran from southwestern North Vietnam through the southeastern portion of the Kingdom of Laos and into South Vietnam.

== Interdiction (1964–1968) ==
Systematic U.S. aerial operations against the Ho Chi Minh Trail had begun on 14 December 1964 with Operation Barrel Roll. With the onset of Operation Rolling Thunder, the strategic aerial bombardment of North Vietnam in April 1965, the U.S. also expanded its interdiction effort in Laos by dividing the Barrel Roll area into two sections on 3 April. The former operation would continue in northeastern Laos while Operation Steel Tiger was initiated in the southern panhandle. The American headquarters in Saigon requested, and received, authorization to control bombing in the area adjacent to South Vietnam's northern provinces in Operation Tiger Hound on 3 December 1965. The U.S. Air Force had already begun to up the ante in its anti-infiltration campaigns by unleashing B-52 Stratofortress bombers against the trail in December 1965. From April through June 1966 there were 400 B-52 anti-infiltration sorties against the system. The PAVN countered this effort by concentrating more anti-aircraft artillery weapons within its logistical network. Between 1964 and the end of 1967 there were 103,148 tactical air sorties launched against the trail, including 1,718 B-52 strikes. During the same timeframe 132 U.S. aircraft or helicopters were shot down over Laos.

So matters stood until the massive PAVN/NLF Tet Offensive of early 1968. Although a tactical victory for American and South Vietnamese forces, Tet became a political disaster. The American public (who had been reassured by President Lyndon B. Johnson and the Pentagon that the communists were incapable of launching any such actions) were stunned by the size and ferocity of the offensive. The light at the end of the tunnel had been extinguished, if it had ever existed at all. The president, in an attempt to nudge Hanoi to the negotiating table, decreed an end to bombing operations in North Vietnam north of the 20th parallel, effectively ending Rolling Thunder on 11 November 1968.

This effectively shifted the bombing campaign towards the southwest, in the direction of the Ho Chi Minh Trail. The interdiction campaign against the enemy logistics corridor was massively expanded due to the increased number of U.S. aircraft (approximately 500 planes) made available by the closure of Rolling Thunder. By November 1968 bombing missions over southern Laos had climbed by 300 percent, from 4,700 sorties in October to 12,800 in November. By the end of the conflict, U.S. and South Vietnamese aircraft would drop over three million tons of ordnance on Laos, three times the total tonnage dropped on North Vietnam. The new campaign against the trail was unprecedented, and not just due to the numbers sorties flown or munitions expended. The U.S. was going to field its latest technology in its attempt to prevent the North Vietnamese from toppling the South Vietnamese government in Saigon.

== Igloo White ==
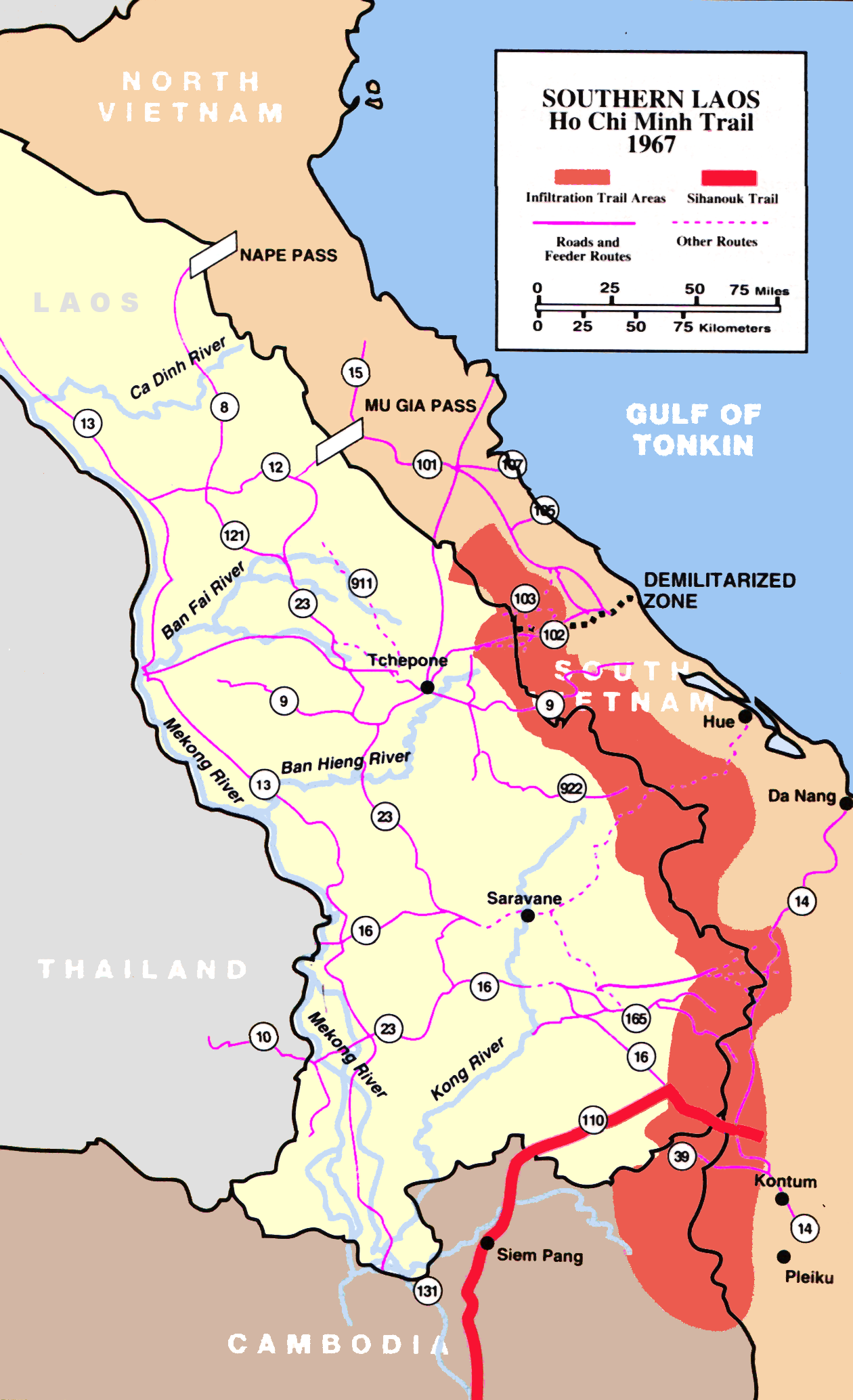
Ho Chi Minh Trail, 1967.

As early as 1966 Secretary of Defense Robert S. McNamara had become increasingly disenchanted with the bombing of the north. No amount of pressure, it seemed, could either drive Hanoi to the negotiating table or slow the flow of PAVN supplies and men to the south. He then began to consider an alternative in the form of a physical strongpoint/electronic barrier to infiltration that would stretch below the Demilitarized Zone from the coast to the Laotian frontier (and possibly beyond). This was the origin of the so-called "McNamara Line."

The physical barrier was to be backed up by air-dropped and hand-emplaced acoustic and seismic sensors that would provide both warning and location of enemy movements. A scientific group was established to find or develop the technology for what was initially titled Practice Nine. On 17 June 1967 the title of the program was altered to Illinois City and on 15 July to Dyemarker, the electronic barrier portion of which was designated Muscle Shoals. In June 1968 it was renamed for the last time, becoming Operation Igloo White.

Igloo White consisted of three interrelated parts. The battery-operated sensors would be monitored by an airborne command and control center (ABCCC), which would relay the information to an infiltration surveillance center (ISC), located at Nakhon Phanom Air Base, Thailand. Computers at the ISC would collate and analyze the data and then relay target coordinates to the ABCCC which would, in turn, direct strike aircraft to the targets. The hand emplacement of sensors and bomb damage assessment missions were to be carried out by the reconnaissance teams of the highly classified Military Assistance Command, Vietnam Studies and Observations Group (SOG), which already operated "over the fence" in Laos. Construction began on the ISC on 6 July 1967 and was completed within three months.

The anti-infiltration effort would be supported by MSQ-77 Combat Skyspot, a ground-based radar bombing system first introduced in Southeast Asia in 1966 to direct B-52 strikes in poor weather or in complete darkness. This system was utilized to direct one-quarter of all strike missions conducted by U.S. aircraft during the conflict. Combat Skyspot was complemented by expanding the radio-based LORAN system utilized by other strike aircraft.

A shakedown of the system took place during the first two weeks of November 1967 and it seemed to work. The PAVN siege of the U.S. Marines at the Khe Sanh Combat Base, in western Quang Tri Province, South Vietnam, provided the opportunity for an operational test. The American command in Saigon launched Operation Niagara, the largest tactical and B-52 operation thus far in the conflict, to support the Marines at Khe Sanh. By the end of January 1968, Muscle Shoals had emplaced 316 sensors in 44 strings to detect PAVN troop movements in the vicinity of the combat base. The operation was deemed a success, but locating and targeting enemy troops moving toward a fixed location like Khe Sanh was not the same as doing it on the Ho Chi Minh Trail.

And there were already problems with the system. The anti-personnel portion of the program had already failed. The presence and movements of enemy troops were to be detected by the utilization of small, wide-area Gravel mines that were to alert the acoustic sensors. The mines rapidly deteriorated in the heat and humidity of Laos, nullifying their effectiveness. The focus of any interdiction campaign, therefore, would have to concentrate on PAVN supply transportation. The war against trucks was about to begin.

== 1968 ==
The immediate result of 11 November bombing halt was that the average daily sortie rate over southern Laos rose to 620 per day before the new campaign had even begun. The freeing of aircraft (Air Force, Navy, and Marine Corps) that had previously been participating in Rolling Thunder, when combined with those from Steel Tiger and Tiger Hound (which were both superseded by Commando Hunt), promised to create an interdiction effort of unprecedented scale. The new sensor-directed effort would see, for the first time, continuous round-the-clock bombing of the communist logistical system. During daylight, the missions would be performed by propeller-driven and jet fighter-bombers and B-52s. At night, fixed-wing gunships would prowl for prey. The new effort would also be supported by aerial defoliation missions (Operation Ranch Hand) and the cloud seeding weather modification effort known as Operation Popeye (see Ho Chi Minh Trail). On 15 November 1968 the Seventh Air Force was granted authorization for launch of Commando Hunt.

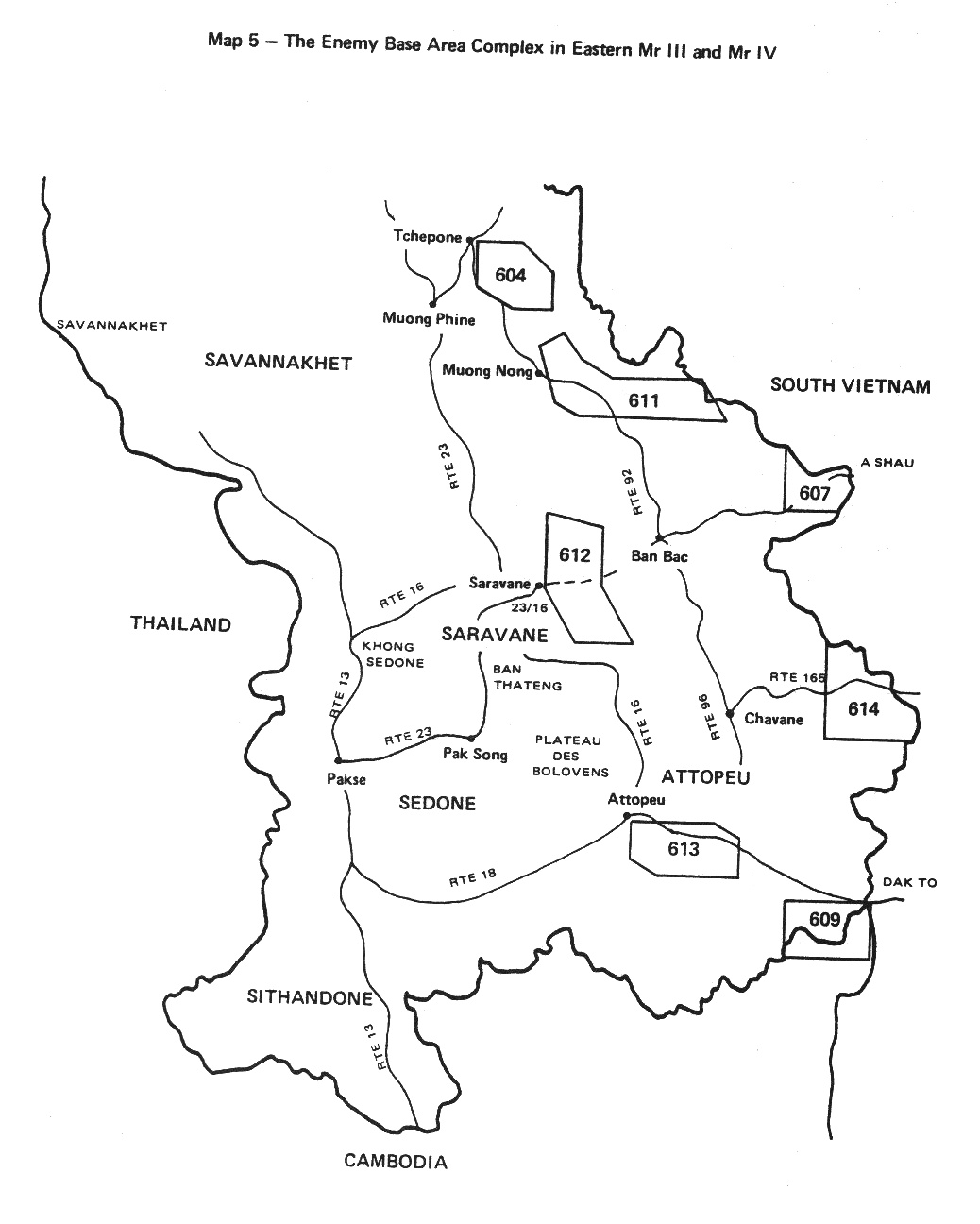
Communist Base Areas, southern Laos.

It was decided to divide Commando Hunt into numerically designated phases that reflected the seasonal weather patterns in southern Laos. Odd numbered campaigns took place during PAVN's high activity period, which occurred during the dry season (November–May). Even numbered campaigns took place during the more dormant wet season (June–October). It was never assumed that the campaigns would halt the North Vietnamese logistical effort, so the goals of the campaigns were limited. They were to have two objectives:

First, to reduce the enemy's logistical flow by "substantially increasing the time needed to move supplies from North Vietnam to the south;" second, "to destroy trucks and supply caches along the roads, pathways, and streams and in the truck parks and storage areas along the Trail."

Due to the failure of the anti-personnel portion of the system, the targets of Commando Hunt were trucks, the infrastructure of the trail (truck parks, supply caches, POL storage, etc.), the terrain itself (by creating landslides to destroy sections of the system), and finally, the ever-increasing numbers of North Vietnamese anti-aircraft weapons.

It was a daunting challenge. The Ho Chi Minh Trail (controlled by the 259th PAVN Logistical Group) consisted of a labyrinth of dirt roads, bicycle and foot paths, bypasses, storage areas, workshops, and truck parks that stretched from the mountain passes of North Vietnam, through the panhandle of Laos, and into east central Cambodia. The entire system was elaborately camouflaged from aerial observation and was constantly being maintained, expanded, and improved. By 1968 PAVN was relying less on manual labor and increasingly utilizing modern construction equipment. The CIA estimated during the year the 259th Group was using 20 bulldozers, eleven road graders, three rock crushers and two steamrollers on the network. Manual labor was still provided by an estimated 40,000 to 50,000 Laotians (mostly pressed into service) and North Vietnamese volunteers.

== 1969 ==
By the end of Commando Hunt I, the first dry season offensive of the campaign (15 November 1968 to 20 April 1969), the Air Force estimated that 7,322 enemy trucks had been destroyed. At the rate of attrition claimed in December, however, the PAVN transportation network should have been destroyed in only a month and a half. It also claimed that 20,723 enemy had been killed by air, 15 percent of the total number believed to have been travelling on, operating, or defending the trail." 56 allied aircraft were shot down during the operation by an estimated 600 communist anti-aircraft weapons. The end of Rolling Thunder, it seemed, had freed up not only U.S. aircraft, but also allowed more PAVN anti-aircraft units to move south to defend the trail. During the year the North Vietnamese began deploying longer-ranged and radar-directed 85 and 100 mm guns.

For the U.S. program there were teething troubles. There was a lack of sufficient numbers of sensor strings and controlling the number of aircraft available for the missions proved problematic. These difficulties could be remedied. Commando Hunt II (1 May through 31 October 1969), however, was thrown off track by phenomena that the Air Force could do absolutely nothing about. The first wet season offensive was hampered by atrocious weather, especially heavy rain (48 inches of rain in July alone).

The real problem for U.S. planners was a lack of sufficient intelligence on the numbers of infiltrators, the amount of supplies being transported, the number of trucks operating, the specific locations of targets in a rapidly changing environment, and the infrastructure of the system. This lack of real intelligence forced the Air Force to basically take its best guess as to PAVN numbers, intentions, and limitations. For instance, Air Force intelligence claimed that 9,012 enemy trucks were destroyed during 1969. Yet, an even lesser estimate of trucks destroyed by the Defense Intelligence Agency only resulted in their computer model reaching zero (where the enemy was supposed to be out of trucks) no fewer than 14 times during the same time period.

The Air Force's computing of communist personnel losses, according to Air Force historian Bernard Nalty was "based on so many assumptions that the end product represented an exercise in metaphysics rather than mathematics." He was seconded by historian Earl Tilford who explained that

Americans expected progress, or at least quantifiable measures of success...It is in their nature to do so. Commando Hunt provided the figures that sated that appetite. Productivity epitomized what the war had become: an exercise in management effectiveness.

It was, however, difficult for the Air Force to do otherwise. Observation of the trail from the air was difficult at best. Human intelligence was provided by CIA-backed Laotian irregulars and Thai volunteers operating from the western side of the system while the eastern side was covered by SOG. The depth of penetration by these reconnaissance efforts was hampered by the same man who had the last word in the bombing effort, Ambassador William H. Sullivan in Vientiane. The ambassador (with the full backing of the State Department and the CIA) maintained a firm hold over all military operations conducted within the supposedly "neutral" Kingdom of Laos. All targets had to be pre-approved either by Sullivan himself or by the air attaché within Project 404, the understaffed U.S. military operations center within the embassy.

By the end of the year the Americans felt that they were better prepared to deliver destruction to the trail system. During Commando Hunt III (1 November 1969 to 30 April 1970), the Air Force claimed that 6,428 enemy trucks destroyed and another 3,604 damaged. 60 aircraft were shot down during this phase of the campaign by an estimated 743 anti-aircraft weapons. This increased number of aircraft losses forced the Air Force to decree that flak suppression missions would accompany the bombers on missions over the trail. Armed with cluster bomb units (CBUs), the fighter bombers were poised to pounce upon any enemy anti-aircraft positions identified by other aircraft.

On the other side of the fence, the North Vietnamese transported and/or stored 70,000 tons of supplies in 3,000 trucks with a net loss of 13.5 percent during the year. During the same period about 80,000 PAVN troops made the trip south. A new North Vietnamese logistical effort, discovered by U.S. intelligence in late 1968, was a petroleum, oil, and lubricants (POL) pipeline running southwest from the North Vietnamese city of Vinh. By early the following year the pipeline had crossed the Laotian frontier and by summer it had reached Muong Nong and the approaches to the A Sầu Valley. The plastic line, assisted by numerous small pumping stations, could transfer diesel fuel, gasoline, and kerosene all in the same pipe.

== 1970 ==
From October 1969 until April 1970 (probably anticipating the loss of their Cambodian supply conduit) the North Vietnamese launched "probably their most intense logistical effort of the whole war." The motivating factor became evident in April, when U.S. and South Vietnamese ground forces launched an incursion into the PAVN base areas lining the eastern border of Cambodia. Thousands of tons of food and munitions, including 7,000 tons of rice and weapons, were destroyed; as a result, PAVN operations were set back by an estimated 15 months. However, the U.S. also assumed an abiding responsibility for the survival of the Lon Nol regime, which remained dependent on US air support.

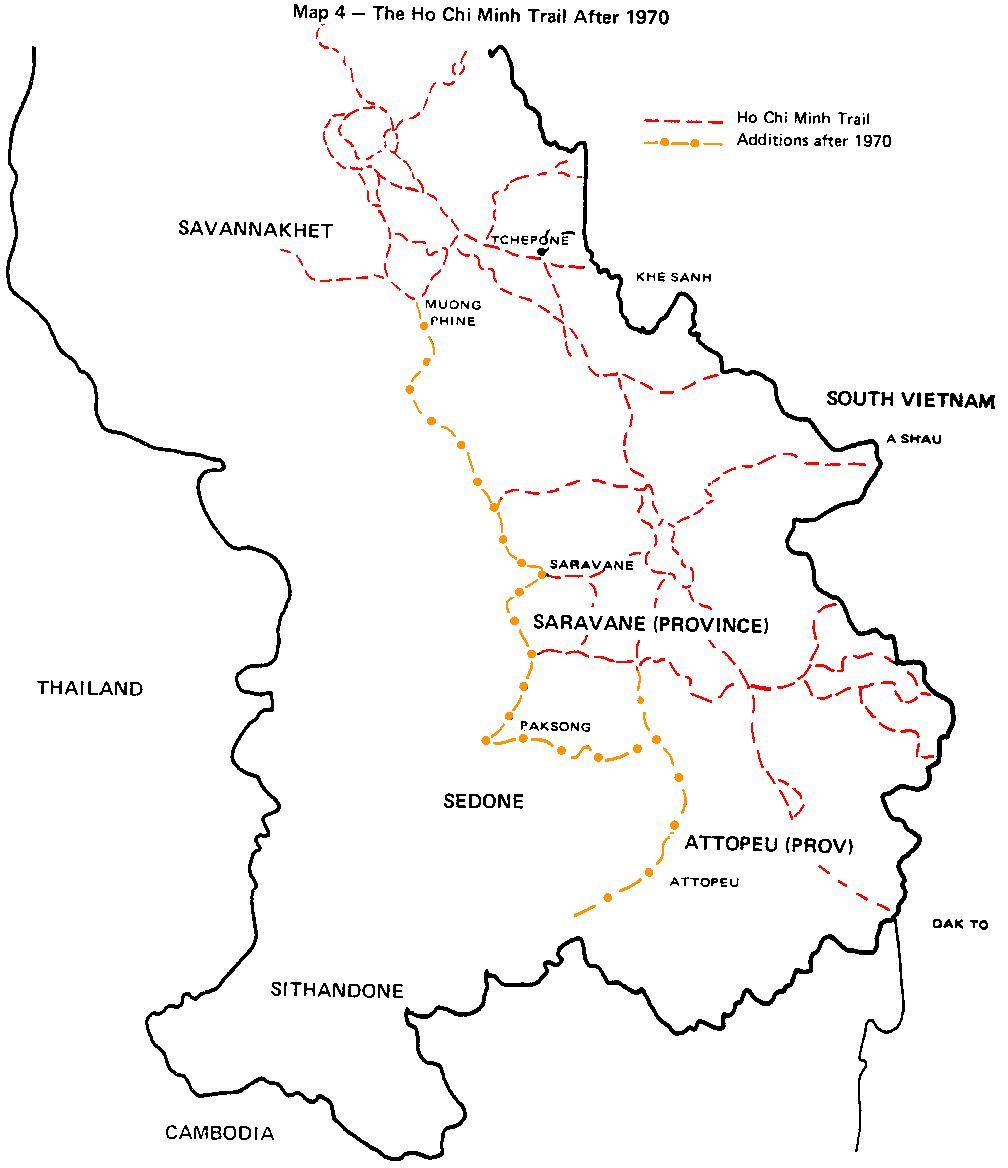
Ho Chi Minh Trail, 1970.

Missions conducted by CIA-backed Laotian irregulars and Thai volunteers operating on the western flank of the trail (and the Lon Nol coup in Cambodia) prompted PAVN to launch offensives in Laos to protect and expand their system. As a result, the North Vietnamese seized the towns of Saravane, Paksong, and Attopeu. Although fighting continued in these areas, what had once been a 30-mile (48 km) wide logistical corridor was now expanded to 90 miles (140 km). Meanwhile, PAVN was also expanding its other methods of logistical transportation.

In 1967 U.S. recon photographs uncovered an unusual sight. POL barrels were spotted floating in the waters of the Kong River south of Ban Bak, Laos. Soon, PAVN was making use of the Banghiang River which flowed southwestward from the Demilitarized Zone all the way to the Mekong River, for the same purposes. The watertight drums were launched en masse from tributary streams into the main channel, floated downstream, and were recovered by systems of nets and booms. The Kaman River was added to the system in 1969. By 1970 the North Vietnamese were making intense use of streams and rivers to supplement their logistical route, especially in the rainy season, when the water levels rose and the roadways became impassable mires. During one two and one-half-month period during 1969, over 10,000 POL barrels were spotted in the waterways of southeastern Laos.

The Air Force estimated that during the year there were 3,375 trucks working the trail system in southern Laos, yet it claimed that 12,368 enemy trucks were destroyed during the year. During the same time frame, the CIA estimated that only 6,000 trucks existed in the entire North Vietnamese inventory. The buildup of PAVN anti-aircraft defenses continued to increase. During Commando Hunt III the Seventh and Thirteenth Air Force estimated that 700 23-mm and 37 mm weapons, most of them radar-guided, were defending the trail system in southern Laos.

Beginning in 1967 the Air Force had fielded a whole series of fixed-wing, side-firing gunships for nighttime interdiction missions. This evolution in aircraft was a "dynamic reaction between opposing forces which led to a refinement of the tactics of employing round the clock interdiction and prompted development of specialized night attack systems."

As the operation progressed, newer technologies (low-light television cameras, infrared vision devices, side-looking radars, radar jamming equipment, and computer-directed fire control systems) were also fielded to improve the performance of these aircraft. The apex of these developments was reached by the deployment of the AC-130E Spectre, a conversion of the venerable C-130 Hercules cargo transport, in February 1968. By 1970 the Spectre had become the most formidable weapon platform fielded by the Air Force in its war against trucks. The PAVN 377 Air Division's history notes "Just one hour when AC-130s did not operate over our chokepoints was both precious and rare."

== 1971 ==
During Commando Hunt V (10 October 1970 to 30 April 1971) Air Force intelligence claimed 16,266 trucks destroyed and another 7,700 damaged during the dry season offensive. The Seventh Air Force headquarters in Saigon, chagrined by the enormity of the figures, recomputed them and lowered the estimate to 11,000 destroyed and 8,000 damaged. In fact, there were only 2,500–3,000 PAVN trucks operating on the trail during 1970–1971, each carrying approximately four tons of materiel.

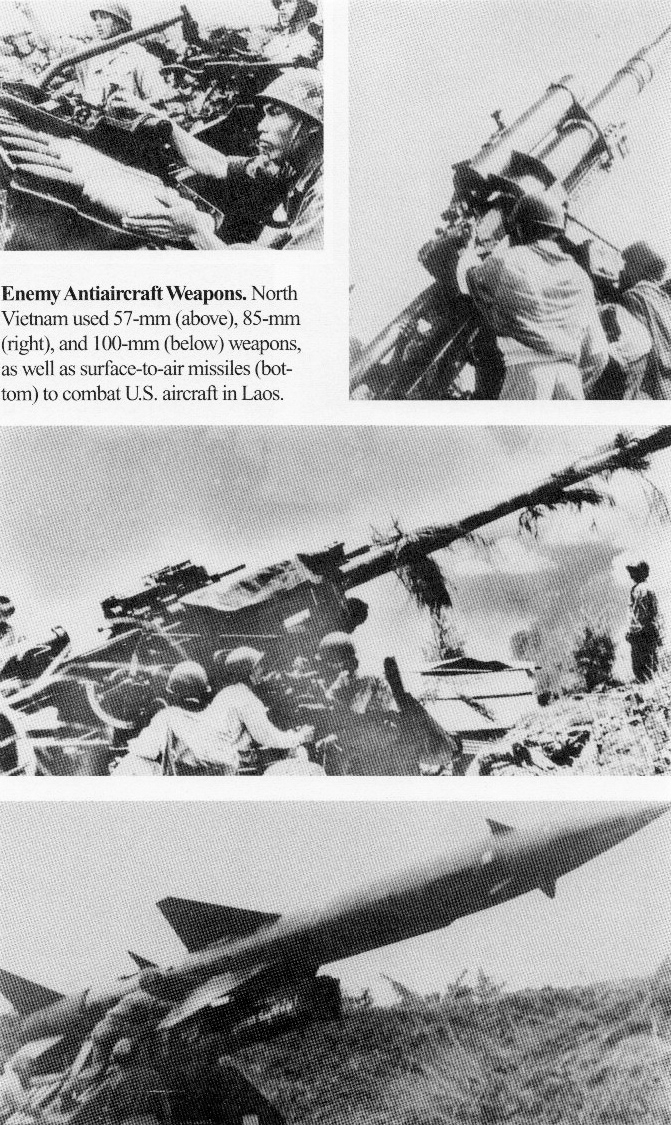
Evolution of North Vietnamese anti-aircraft weapons, 1965–1972.

77,000 combat sorties were flown during the offensive while the number of communist anti-aircraft weapons defending it reached 1,500. Although only 11 aircraft were brought down by air defense fire during the dry season, this lower level of destroyed aircraft was not the result of any U.S. countermeasures. The lower figures were attributed to the fact that many PAVN air defense units had been moved to the Tchepone area to support the counteroffensive against the South Vietnamese Operation Lam Son 719.

The interdiction effort during Commando Hunt VI (15 May through 31 October 1971) was thrown off by Lam Son 719 during April and May. During the offensive, 80 percent of all U.S. aerial sorties were directed to support it. This highlighted what was now rapidly becoming a dual dilemma for the Air Force: First, the gradual withdrawal of U.S. forces from Southeast Asia meant that there were fewer and fewer air assets available with which to conduct more and more missions. During Commando Hunt, for example, 1,777 aircraft were utilized during the campaign. By the time of the opening of Commando Hunt VI, that figure had decreased to 1,199 aircraft and this number dropped to 953 before that phase was completed; Second, this state of affairs was exacerbated by the withdrawal of sorties to conduct missions for Operation Freedom Deal in Cambodia.

During the year the North Vietnamese transported or stored 60,000 tons of supplies with a net loss rate of 2.07 percent. During the same period, 195,000 PAVN replacements moved through the system to the southern battlefields. As during the previous year, PAVN continued to expand the system. By the end of May the North Vietnamese had occupied Muong Phalane, Ban Houei Sai, and Paksong. They also retook Attopeu, Saravane, and Ban Thateng, cementing their hold on the strategic Bolovens Plateau of south central Laos. Commando Hunt VI, launched during the wet season, was hampered by heavy rain and the arrival of two typhoons which threw off both the PAVN logistical effort and U.S. attempts to interdict it.

== 1972 ==
Air Force planners believed that Operation Commando Hunt VII (1 November 1971 to 29 March 1972) would be the most fruitful of the entire campaign. During this dry season phase, the U.S. averaged 182 attack fighters, 13 fixed-wing gunships, and 21 B-52 sorties per day. As a result of this all-out effort, U.S. intelligence analysts claimed 10,689 North Vietnamese trucks were destroyed and credited AC-130E Spectres alone with 7,335 of these kills. During the campaign, however, ominous signs appeared in the mountains of Laos. On 10 January 1972, a U.S. O–1 observation aircraft, flying near the Mu Gia Pass, dodged the first surface-to-air missile(SAM) launched from Laotian soil. This event, and others like it, were compounded by the crossing into Laotian airspace of North Vietnamese MiG fighters. Both of these threats tended to force off B-52 and tactical air strikes. During the campaign, ten American aircraft were lost to SAMs (mostly SA-2 Guidelines) and another thirteen were lost to more conventional weapons.

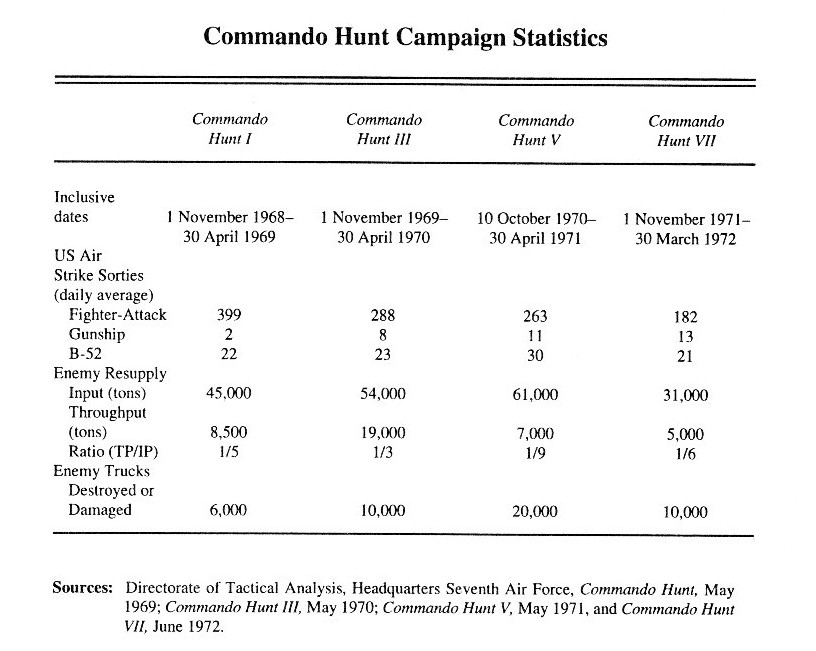
Commando Hunt statistics

One new innovation that took place during the campaign was renewed interest in personnel infiltration. This aspect of the PAVN effort had been virtually ignored since the initiation of the Commando Hunt in 1968. An intelligence collection and technical reassessment effort invited the Air Force to make another attempt to force the North Vietnamese pay for their effort in blood instead of in imported supplies and trucks. The result was Island Tree the launching of a personnel anti-infiltration effort during Commando Hunt VII. However, it was too little and far too late.

American analysts were elated when they discovered that the number of trucks ordered by North Vietnam from its communist allies in late 1971 exceeded those of previous years. 6,000 vehicles had been ordered from the Soviet Union alone (as opposed to the usual 3,000) and this seemed to indicate that the enemy was hurting for transportation and that the campaign was working. However, since 80 percent of the vehicles arrived in North Vietnam at least six weeks before the launching of the Nguyen Hue Offensive (known to the U.S. as the Easter Offensive), they probably reflected anticipated losses.

Commando Hunt VII came to a close with the launching of the PAVN offensive mentioned above. This conventional attack, backed by armor, heavy artillery, and anti-aircraft units (including SAMs) rolled over the two northernmost provinces of South Vietnam while two smaller offensives were launched in central and southern parts of the country. All U.S. and South Vietnamese air assets were diverted to first slowing, and then halting the onslaught. They were then utilized in the first sustained bombing of North Vietnam since late 1968 (see Operation Linebacker). Interdiction missions were then diverted to carry out an even heavier aerial offensive against the north (see Operation Linebacker II). The end was nigh for Commando Hunt. With the signing of the Paris Peace Accord in March 1973, the Vietnam War finally came to an end for the U.S.

== Conclusion ==
The goal of the Commando Hunt campaigns was not to halt infiltration, but to make the North Vietnamese pay too heavy a price for their effort. Corollary to this was the destruction of as much of their logistical system as possible and to tie down as many PAVN forces in static security roles as possible. Aerial interdiction could not succeed unless Hanoi felt the pressure and relented. The seed of the campaign's failure, however, was sown in its first operation. Despite the expenditure of an enormous amount of ordnance over five years, the level of that pressure was never going to be sufficient to deter Hanoi from its goal.

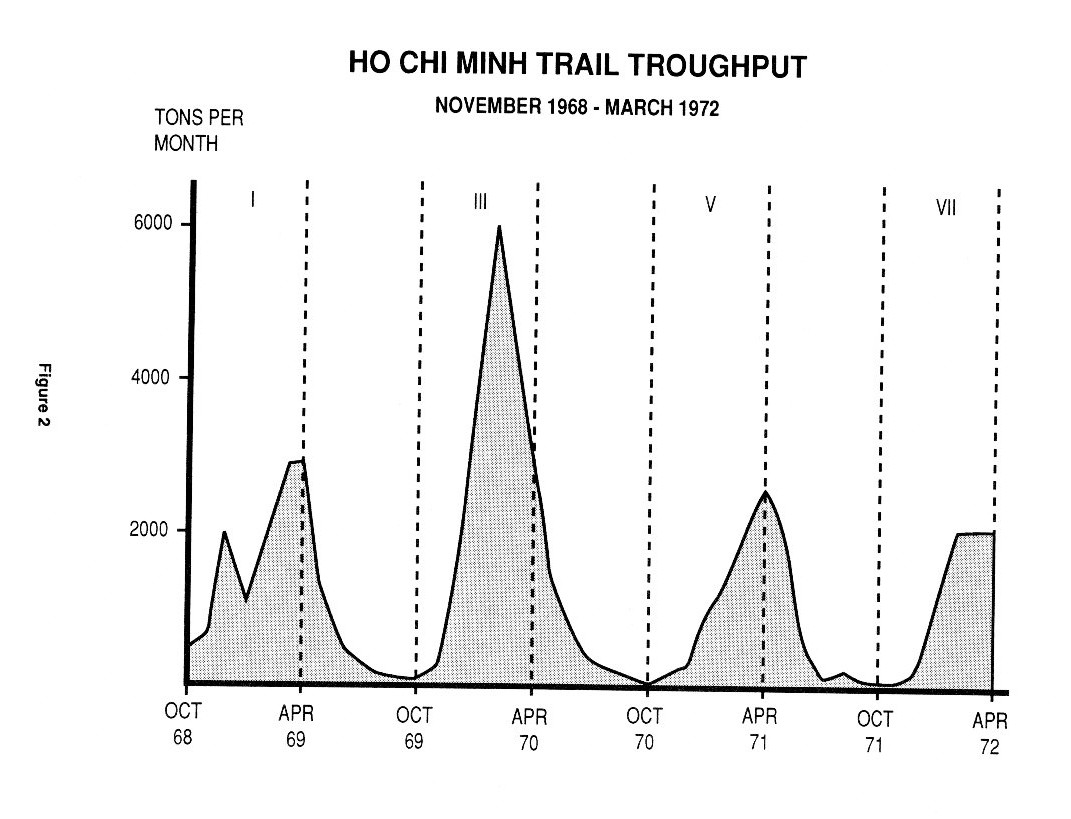
Estimated North Vietnamese supply throughput

This failure had three sources. First, there were the political constraints imposed by Washington that limited the entire American effort in Southeast Asia (the continued fiction of Laotian and Cambodian "neutrality", failure to disrupt the trail with U.S. ground forces when it would have made a difference, etc.) The second source of the failure was the utilization of what Colonel Charles Morrison has called "over-sophisticated methods" against "elemental systems." The primitive logistical needs of the North Vietnamese (at least until the final phase of the conflict) allowed them to slip under the radar of their more technologically sophisticated enemy. Finally, all of the above were exacerbated by the communists' enviable ability to adapt their doctrine and tactics and to turn weaknesses into strengths.

The interdiction effort (like the entire American effort in Vietnam) became focused on statistics as a measure of success and "devolved from considered tactics to meaningless ritual." At the end of the Commando Hunt campaigns the Air Force intelligence service claimed that 51,000 trucks and 3,400 anti-aircraft guns were destroyed in all seven operations. Statistics, however, proved no substitute for strategy and, "for all the perceived success in that numbers game, the Air Force succeeded only in fooling itself into believing that Commando Hunt was working. Regardless of the constant American belief that its enemy was on the verge of collapse, PAVN maintained and expanded its logistical flow to combat units in the field and managed to launch major offensives in 1968 and 1972 and a counteroffensive in 1971. The North Vietnamese built, maintained, and expanded, under a deluge of bombs, over 3,000 kilometers of roads and paths through the mountains and jungles while only two percent of the troops sent south were killed by the American effort to halt their infiltration into South Vietnam.

== See also ==
- Covert operations
- 1st Combat Evaluation Group
