= Operation Tiger Hound =

Part of the Vietnam War (1965–1968)

- Part of Vietnam War
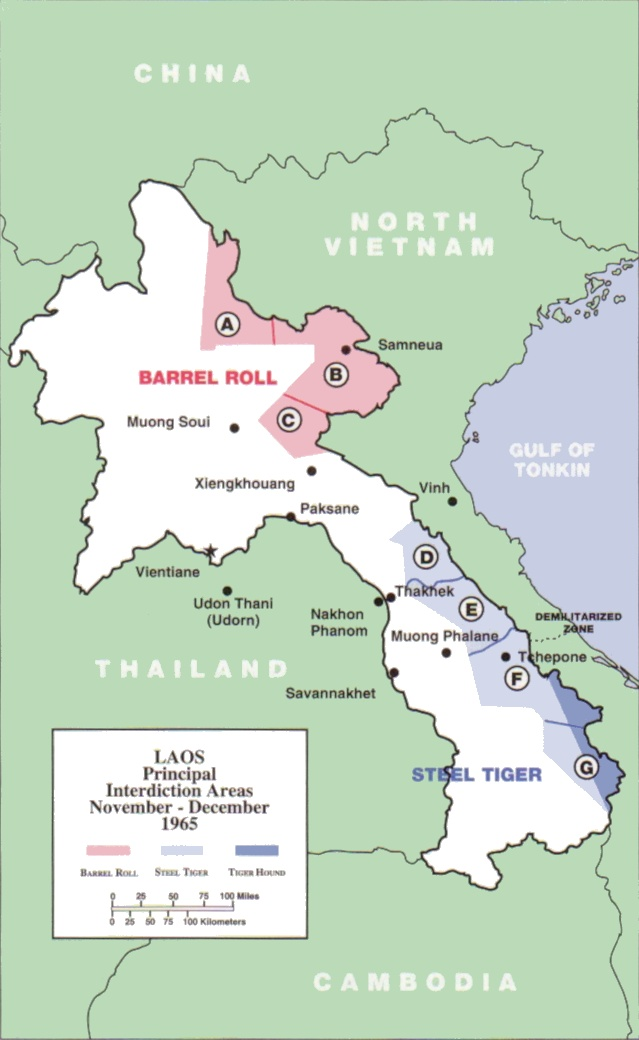
- Barrell Roll/Steel Tiger/Tiger Hound areas of operations
Date	5 December 1965 – 11 November 1968
Location	Southeastern Laos
Result	Strategic US Failure

Belligerents
United States; Republic of Vietnam	Democratic Republic of Vietnam

Commanders and leaders
	(North Vietnam) Đồng Sĩ Nguyên

Operation Tiger Hound was a covert U.S. 2nd Air Division, later Seventh Air Force and U.S. Navy Task Force 77 aerial interdiction campaign conducted in southeastern Laos from 5 December 1965 till 11 November 1968, during the Vietnam War. The purpose of the operation was to interdict the flow of People's Army of Vietnam (PAVN) supplies on the Ho Chi Minh Trail (the Truong Son Strategic Supply Route to the North Vietnamese) from the Democratic Republic of Vietnam (North Vietnam), through southeastern Laos, and into the northern provinces of the Republic of Vietnam (South Vietnam). The missions were originally controlled by the 2d Air Division until that headquarters was superseded by the Seventh Air Force on 1 April 1966.

The geographic boundary of the operation was carved from the area of Laos already under bombardment under Operation Steel Tiger. This was done at the behest of the American commander in South Vietnam, General William C. Westmoreland, who saw the area of Laos that bordered the five northernmost provinces of South Vietnam as an extension of his area of operations. The U.S. Joint Chiefs of Staff agreed. Unlike Operation Barrel Roll and Steel Tiger, however, the bombing in the new area would be conducted by aircraft of the Republic of Vietnam Air Force and by U.S. Air Force units based in South Vietnam (aircraft participating in Barrel Roll and Steel Tiger were generally based in Thailand).

By the end of 1968 and the absorption of Tiger Hound operations by Operation Commando Hunt, 103,148 tactical air sorties had been flown over Laos. These missions were supplemented by 1,718 B-52 Stratofortress sorties under Operation Arc Light. During the same time period, 132 U.S. aircraft or helicopters were shot down over Laos.
