= Đồng Sĩ Nguyên =

North Vietnamese General (1923–2019)

- Born: March 1, 1923; Quảng Trạch District, Annam, French Indochina
- Died: April 4, 2019 (aged 96) Hanoi, Vietnam
- Allegiance: Vietnam
- Branch: People's Army of Vietnam
- Rank: Lieutenant General (Trung tướng)
- Commands: Group 559, Ho Chi Minh trail
- Conflicts: Operation Barrel Roll; Operation Rolling Thunder; Operation Steel Tiger; Operation Commando Hunt; Operation Tiger Hound

Đồng Sĩ Nguyên, also spelled Đồng Sỹ Nguyên, other name Nguyễn Hữu Vũ (1 March 1923 – 4 April 2019), was a Vietnamese soldier and politician. During the Vietnam War Nguyen was commander of Group 559, which created and operated the Ho Chi Minh trail, a crucial logistical network that ran from North Vietnam to South Vietnam through the kingdoms of Laos and Cambodia. He was Deputy Prime Minister of Vietnam, a member of the Politburo of the Communist Party of Vietnam, lieutenant-general of the North Vietnamese Army, and minister of transport of Vietnam. He was born in Quảng Bình Province, home to general Võ Nguyên Giáp and Ngô Đình Diệm, president of the Republic of Vietnam.

== Biography ==
Born on March 1, 1923, to a middle-class family in Quang Trung Commune, Quảng Trạch District, Quảng Bình Province, Dong Sy Nguyen attended Sainte Marie Lycée in Đồng Hới. He participated in anti-French political movements and was sought by the French colonists; therefore he fled to Thailand and participated in overseas Vietnamese patriotic movements there. He joined the Indochinese Communist Party in 1939.

In 1944, he secretly returned to Vietnam and was made leader of the Communist Party committee branch in Quang Trach Phu, served as editor-in-chief of the Hong Lac Newspaper, built up the Trung Thuan Military Zone, trained the armed forces, and participated in the August Revolution. After the August Revolution, he was nominated as the leader of the Viet Minh in Quảng Bình Province. He was a member of the first session of the National Assembly of Vietnam.

== Joining the army ==
When the First Indochinese War broke out, Đồng Sĩ Nguyên was assigned the leader of Viet Minh's army in Quảng Bình Province and the provincial army's communist party committee member. In 1950, he was sent to Việt Bắc to attend an advanced level army class, then he was sent to the Bureau General of Politics of Vietnamese Army to act as an envoy in Command wing in Lower Laos in Winter-Spring Campaign of 1953-1954.

In 1954, he was dispatched to the General Staff of North Vietnamese Army, in charge of Civilian Forces Mobilization Department. In 1959, he was promoted lieutenant-colonel. In 1961, he was sent to China to attend Beijing Advanced Military School. In 1964, he came back to North Vietnam and was assigned Vice General Staff for a brief period, then the head of Communist Party Committee of North Vietnamese Army's arm Military Zone IV in 1965, and Chief Command and Head of Communist Party Committee arm in North Vietnamese Volunteer Armed Troops in Central and Southern Laos.

In late 1965, he was wounded and returned to Hanoi for medical treatment, he was assigned Vice Director of the Bureau of Logistics of North Vietnamese Army and Frontline Logistics, reporting to Dinh Duc Thien. In early 1967 (although he was offered the position in December 1966), he was assigned Chief-in-Command of 559 Troop, replacing colonel Hoang Van Thai. He remained in this position until 1976.

Dong Sy Nguyen was one of important persons in constructing the Ho Chi Minh trail during Vietnam War. When he became commander of the Ho Chi Minh trail he converted it from an old low-key covert supply line into a modern strategic overt battlefield. Much of his success stemmed from the fact that he converted most of his forces, which had previously used foot power, bicycles or elephants to carry loads, into vehicle transportation units. He then equipped these troops as fighting units and supported their activities with better supplied and fortified army stations, he installed an advanced communications network to link between stations and constructed a fuel pipeline that stretched across the mountains both in Lao and Vietnam. Later he went on to strengthen anti-aircraft defenses, deployed surface-to-air missile sites at crucial locations to disrupt B-52 missions and designed mobile anti-aircraft detachments. His rational for these changes was that there was no legal justification not to, and the trail needed to be transformed in order to support what North Vietnam needed to resource the war in the South, a situation partly linked to both China and the Soviets because they had agreed to increase their military aid to North Vietnam.

In 1974, he was conferred lieutenant-general. In 1976, he was promoted deputy minister of the Ministry of National Defense in charge of Economic Construction, then Minister of Construction, Minister of Transportation. In 1979, he returned to the military to assume Command-in-Chief and leader of the Communist Party of the Capital Military Zone (an arm of Vietnamese Army in charge of defending Hanoi). He was a member of the secession IV Central Committee of the Communist Party of Vietnam.

== Back to civil duty ==
From 1982, he was an alternate of the session V Politburo then member of Politburo of the Central Executive Committee of the Communist Party of Vietnam (the supreme power body of the Communist Party of Vietnam) (1986–1991) and Vice Chairman of the Council of the Ministers (Cabinet) and Minister of Transport.

After he had retired from above positions, he was assigned as a special governmental envoy in charge of Programme 327 (an afforestation programme). He was assigned by Vietnamese prime minister Phan Văn Khải as the special envoy in supervision of Ho Chi Minh Highway. His wife is Nguyen Thi Ngoc Lan, they have 4 sons and 2 daughters. His eldest son is Nguyen Sy Hung, chairman of the board of directors of Vietnam Airlines.

Đồng Sĩ Nguyên was interviewed in 2003 and 2004 for the books A History of the Ho Chi Minh Trail, The Road to Freedom and Ho Chi Minh's Blueprint for Revolution, in the Words of Vietnamese Strategists and Operatives by Virginia Morris and Clive Hills.

Đồng Sĩ Nguyên was interviewed for The Vietnam War by Ken Burns and Lynn Novick, and appeared in four episodes.
