= Operation Steel Tiger =

Part of the Vietnam War (1965–1968)

- Part of Vietnam War, Laotian Civil War, Arc Light
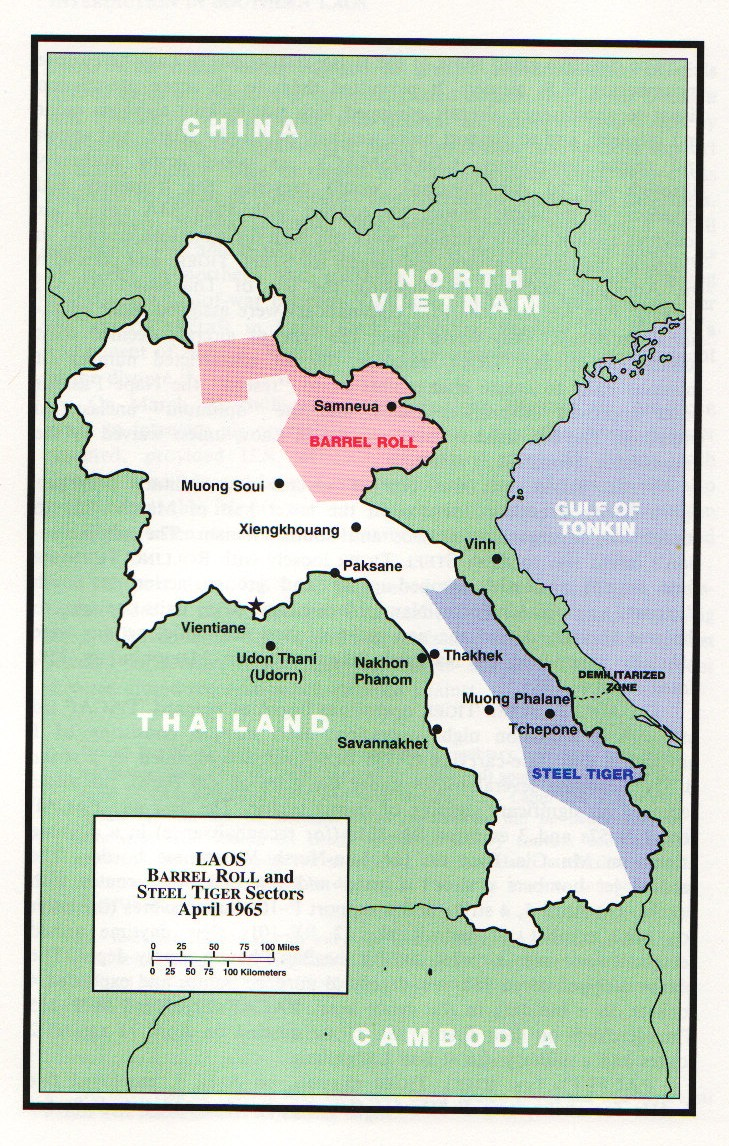
- Barrell Roll/Steel Tiger Areas of Operations
Date	3 April 1965 – 11 November 1968
Location	Southeastern Laos
Result	Strategic US failure: North Vietnamese and Viet Cong supply lines slowed, but Ho Chi Minh trail remains open

Belligerents
United States; South Vietnam; Laos	North Vietnam; Viet Cong

Commanders and leaders
	(North Vietnam) Đồng Sĩ Nguyên

Units involved
(United States) 2nd Air Division (United States) Seventh Air Force (United States) Task Force 77	

Casualties and losses
132 aircraft or helicopters lost	

Operation Steel Tiger was a covert U.S. 2nd Air Division, later Seventh Air Force and U.S. Navy Task Force 77 aerial interdiction effort targeted against the infiltration of People's Army of Vietnam (PAVN) men and material moving south from the Democratic Republic of Vietnam (DRV or North Vietnam) through southeastern Laos to support their military effort in the Republic of Vietnam (South Vietnam) during the Vietnam War.

The operation was initiated by the 2nd Air Division on 3 April 1965, continued under the direction of the Seventh Air Force when that headquarters was created on 1 April 1966, and had a subsidiary operation code-named Operation Tiger Hound. The purpose of Steel Tiger was to impede the flow of men and materiel on the enemy logistical routes collectively known as the Ho Chi Minh Trail (the Truong Son Strategic Supply Route to the North Vietnamese).

Bombing of the trail system had begun on 14 December 1964 with the advent of Operation Barrel Roll. Due to increasing U.S. intelligence of the build-up of regimental-size PAVN units operating in South Vietnam, the increased American military presence in that country, and the initiation of Operation Rolling Thunder, American planners in Washington and Saigon decided that the bombing in southeastern Laos should be stepped up. On 11 November 1968 Steel Tiger and Tiger Hound were combined and renamed Operation Commando Hunt.

It was estimated by U.S. intelligence analysts that, during 1965, 4,500 PAVN troops were infiltrated through Laos along with 300 tons of materiel each month. From April to June 1966, the U.S. launched 400 B-52 Stratofortress anti-infiltration sorties against the trail system. By the end of 1967 and the absorption of Steel Tiger operations into Commando Hunt, 103,148 tactical air sorties had been flown in Laos. These strikes were supplemented by 1,718 B-52 Arc Light strikes. During the same time frame, 132 U.S. aircraft or helicopters had been shot down over Laos. The actions implemented aircraft of the Air Force, Marines, and Navy flying from carriers in the South China Sea as well as bases in South Vietnam and Thailand. While B-52 bombers accounted for a majority of the strikes, the most effective aircraft were fixed wing gunships, including the AC-47, the AC-119, and the AC-130.

Operation Steel Tiger, Operation Tiger Hound, and Operation Commando Hunt inevitably slowed the flow of North Vietnamese and Viet Cong men and supplies into South Vietnam and required them to divert a multitude of assets to keep the Ho Chi Minh Trail in serviceable condition, however airpower was never able to completely close the trail during the war.

== Sources ==
- Littauer, Raphael and Normon Uphoff, eds, The Air War in Indochina. Boston: Beacon Press, 1972.
