= Task Force 77 (United States Navy) =

US Navy aircraft carrier battle force

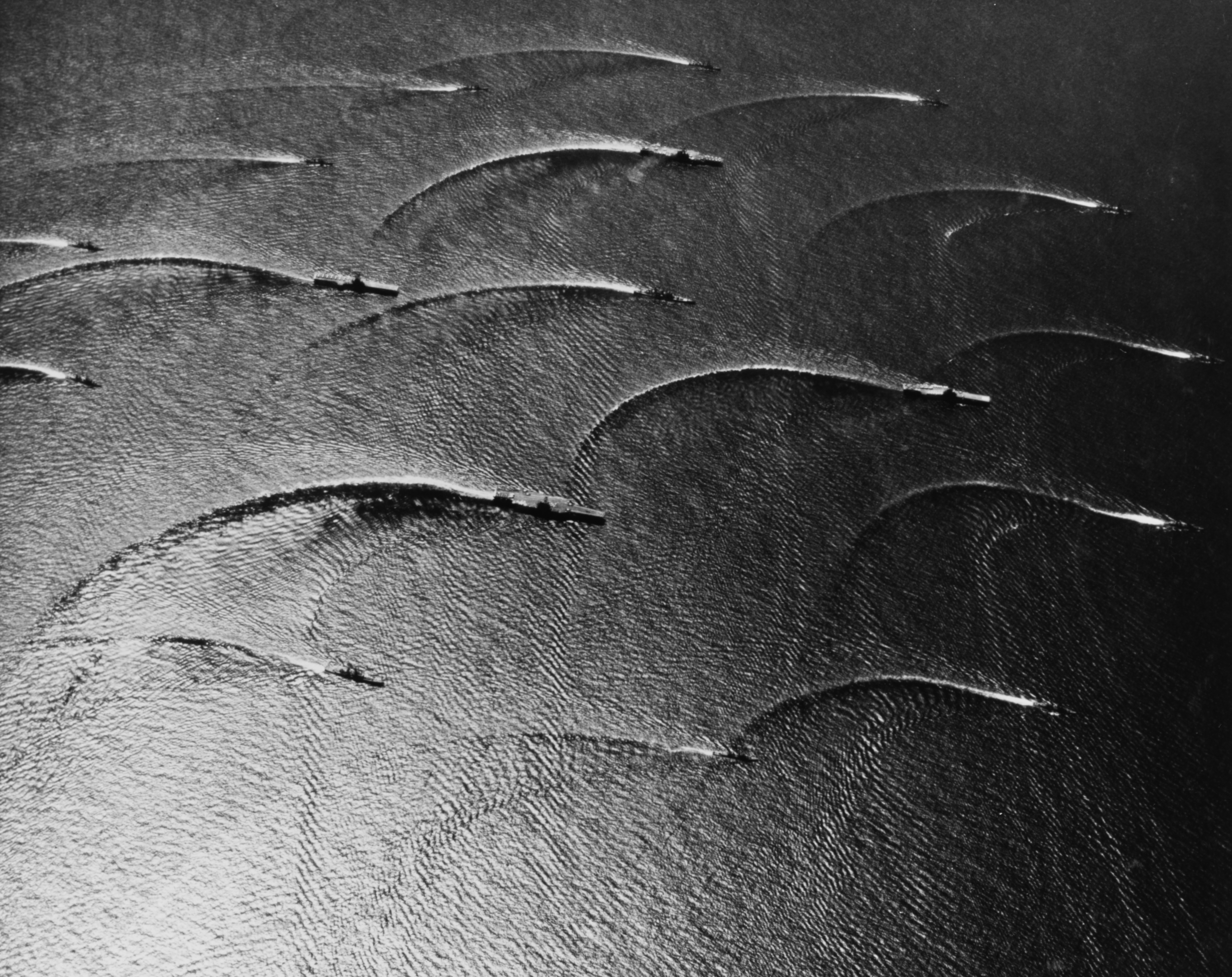
Task Force 77 (1965)

For decades, Task Force 77 was the aircraft carrier battle/strike force of the United States Seventh Fleet in the United States Navy (USN), a designation lasting from the final year of the Second World War until the disestablishment of the task force in 2000.

== History ==
=== World War II ===
Task Force 77 formed the main striking force of the Seventh Fleet, the main naval force of the Allied South West Pacific Area. Task Group 77.2, for example, was supporting landings during the Battle of Biak on the northern coast of New Guinea, and was commanded by Rear-Admiral Jesse B. Oldendorf.

In September 1944, USS Pennsylvania steamed to Seeadler Harbor on Manus Island in the Admiralty Islands for repairs. On 28 September, she arrived there and entered a floating dry dock on 1 October for a week's repairs. Pennsylvania left on 12 October in company with the battleships Mississippi, Tennessee, California, Maryland, and West Virginia, remaining under the command of Rear Admiral Jesse Oldendorf. These ships, designated Task Group 77.2, formed the Fire Support Group for the upcoming operations in the Philippines. They arrived off Leyte on 18 October and took up bombardment positions; over the next four days, they covered Underwater Demolition Teams, beach reconnaissance operations, and minesweepers clearing the way for the landing force.

Task Group 77.4 was at the center of the Battle off Samar in 1944, part of the larger Battle of Leyte Gulf.

=== Korean War ===
During the Korean War, Task Force 77 performed a number of combat deployments, where it provided air support and performed interdiction missions as part of the UN forces. Task Force 77 had carrier stations in both the Sea of Japan (East Coast Task Force) and the Yellow Sea (West Coast Task Force, designated Task Force 95), the latter consisting of carriers of the Royal Navy (RN), Royal Australian Navy (RAN), and USN escort carriers due to its proximity to the People's Republic of China. Seventeen USN, one RAN and five RN aircraft carriers served in United Nations carrier operations at some point in time during the Korean War. During the Korean War, Rear Admiral G.R. Henderson, USN, commanded Carrier Division Five (CARDIV FIVE) and served as Commander, Task Force 70 (CTF 70) and Commander, Task Force 77 (CTF-77) aboard Princeton. Subsequent commanders of CARDIV FIVE moved back and forth between Yokosuka, Japan and the Korean Theater, serving as CTF 70 or CTF 77 on multiple occasions.

=== Cold War (pre-Vietnam) ===
Between conflicts, Task Force 77 was held in readiness for supporting French operations during the siege of Dien Bien Phu in 1954, and off Formosa (now Taiwan) during the several Quemoy-Matsu Crises. It also conducted limited operations over Laos in 1961, 1962 and 1964 before the commitment of U.S. combat forces to the Vietnam War. Prior to the Vietnam War, the location of COMCARDIV FIVE moved between several Pacific ports and utilized rotating Pacific Fleet aircraft carriers from the West coast of the U.S. as its flagship.

=== Vietnam War ===
During the Vietnam War, twelve different commanders led CARDIV FIVE and CTF 77 in numerous combat deployments to the Vietnam War zone. Beginning in 1964, COMCARDIV FIVE was permanently deployed to the Western Pacific and dual-hatted CTF 70/CTF 77, homeported at Naval Air Station Cubi Point in the Philippines. During the Vietnam War, Task Force 77 conducted carrier strike operations from the Gulf of Tonkin and South China Sea for nine years, from 1964 to 1973. Twenty-one of the Navy's 23 operational carriers made at least one cruise with the Task Force and served over 9,100 days on the line. The nickname Tonkin Gulf Yacht Club came to be associated with US carrier operations off Vietnam. Rolling Thunder air strikes, armed reconnaissance, and photo reconnaissance missions were conducted against selected targets and lines of communication (LOC) in North Vietnam, while operational procedures were developed by the operating units, 7th Air Force and Carrier Task Force 77, that permitted the full range of coordination for all air operations in the Rolling Thunder program.

As the U.S. Navy entered heavy combat in Southeast Asia between 1965 and 1968, a chain of command evolved which reflected the complex character of the war. In theory, Commander in Chief, Pacific was the commander of all American forces in Asia, including those assigned to Commander, U.S. Military Assistance Command, Vietnam (COMUSMACV). The U.S. Pacific Fleet was the naval component of the Pacific Command and as such directed the Navy's activities in that ocean. Subordinate to Commander in Chief, U.S. Pacific Fleet (CINCPACFLT) was Commander, U.S. Seventh Fleet, who conducted those naval operations in Southeast Asia primarily external to South Vietnam. The fleet's Attack Carrier Striking Force (Task Force 77) mounted from the South China Sea the aerial interdiction campaign in Laos and North Vietnam, while Seventh Fleet's cruiser and destroyer units hunted the enemy's logistic craft along the North Vietnamese coast, bombarded targets ashore, and provided naval gunfire support to allied forces in South Vietnam.

From the South China Sea, the Seventh Fleet's Attack Carrier Strike Force participated in Operations Rolling Thunder and Blue Tree in North Vietnam; the Barrel Roll, Steel Tiger, and Tiger Hound bombing and Yankee Team reconnaissance efforts in Laos; and the ground support mission in South Vietnam. Except during the period in 1965 and 1966, when the aircraft carrier supporting operations in the South sailed at Dixie Station, the carrier task force was deployed at Yankee Station (after April 1966 at 17°30'N 108°30'E). Generally, before August 1966, two or three carriers operated in Task Force 77, and after that date the number was often three or four. During the Easter Offensive 1972 Five and Six carriers operated in Task Force 77. On each ship, a carrier air wing controlled 70 to 100 aircraft, usually grouped in two fighter and three attack squadrons, a reconnaissance attack squadron, an airborne early warning squadron, and smaller detachments. However, the number depended on the size and class of the carriers, which varied from the large-deck 65,000-ton Forrestal class and 70,000-ton Kitty Hawk class and Enterprise-class ships, to the modified 27,000-ton, World War II-vintage Essex-class ships.

=== Cold War (post-Vietnam) ===
In the post-Vietnam era, Carrier Division Five became Carrier Group Five (CARGRU FIVE) on 30 June 1973 and CTF 77 returned to its Cold War deterrence functions as Commander, Carrier Strike Force 7th Fleet in the Western Pacific, multi-hatted as Commander, Carrier Group FIVE (COMCARGRU FIVE) and Commander, Task Force 70 (CTF 70), the latter task force also being known as Battle Force 7th Fleet. COMCARGRU FIVE was homeported at Cubi Point in the Philippines. In this capacity, CTF 77 alternated embarkation as the Flag Staff aboard Midway, the aircraft carrier homeported in Japan since October 1973 as part of the Forward Deployed Naval Force (FDNF), and rotational Pacific Fleet aircraft carriers from NAS North Island and NAS Alameda, California deploying to the Western Pacific.

Beginning in late 1979, CTF 77 also focused on the carrier presence on Gonzo Station in the Indian Ocean and the Gulf of Oman off of Iran following the Iranian Revolution and the subsequent Iran Hostage Crisis involving the detention of the American Embassy staff in Teheran from November 1979 to January 1981. With the release of the American hostages in 1981, carrier presence off Gonzo Station decreased and CTF 77/CCG-5/CTF 70 returned again to its deterrence posture, primarily as it pertained to Soviet Navy operations in the Western Pacific. CTF 77/CCG-5/CTF 70 operated two and three Carrier Battle Groups from the North Arabian Sea to the North Sea of Japan and the North Pacific Ocean.

=== Gulf War (Operations Desert Shield / Desert Storm) ===
On 2 August 1990, Iraq invaded neighboring Kuwait and U.S. military forces moved into Saudi Arabia as part of Operation Desert Shield to protect that country against invasion by Iraq. On 1 November 1990, CTF 77, embarked aboard USS Midway, assumed the duties of the multi- aircraft carrier Battle Force Zulu on station in the North Arabian Sea. On 15 November, CTF 77 held oversight of Operation Imminent Thunder, an eight-day combined amphibious landing exercise in northeastern Saudi Arabia which involved about 1,000 U.S. Marines, sixteen warships, and more than 1,100 aircraft. Meanwhile, the United Nations set an ultimatum deadline of 15 January 1991 for Iraq to withdraw from Kuwait.

Operation Desert Storm commenced the next day, with the U.S. Navy launching 228 combat aircraft sorties from Midway and Ranger in the Persian Gulf, from Theodore Roosevelt en route to the Gulf, and from John F. Kennedy, Saratoga, and America in the Red Sea. In addition, the Navy launched more than 100 Tomahawk missiles from nine ships in the Mediterranean Sea, the Red Sea, and the Persian Gulf. Desert Storm officially ended 27 February, and Midway departed the Persian Gulf on 11 March 1991, disembarking CTF 77 in the Philippines as it returned to Yokosuka, Japan.

== Disestablishment ==
In mid-2000, CTF 77 was disestablished as a 7th Fleet Task Force and its responsibilities merged into CTF 70, Commander, Battle Force, U.S. 7th Fleet. Commander Task Force 70 remains dual-hatted as Commander, Carrier Strike Group Five. The task force/CSG staff is homeported at United States Fleet Activities Yokosuka, Japan, when not embarked aboard the aircraft carrier also homeported there, currently Ronald Reagan.
