= Sledgehammer Mission Support Site =

Site information
- Type: Army

Location
- Coordinates: 14.1866°N 107.595°E

Site history
- Built: 1967
- In use: 1967-9
- Battles/wars: Vietnam War

Garrison information
- Occupants: MACV-SOG

Sledgehammer Mission Support Site (also known as Sledgehammer MSS, Cu Grok, Hill 1438 or Heavy Drop) was a MACV-SOG base located west of Pleiku, in Kontum Province.

== History ==
The base was located on a steep and narrow ridgeline overlooking the Plei Trap Valley, approximately 46 km west of Pleiku and 20 km east of the Cambodian border.

The base was first established in March 1967 as an operations base and radio relay site to allow SOG teams to remain in contact while on operations in Cambodia.

The base was closed in March 1969.

== Current use ==
The base has reverted to jungle.

== See also ==
- Hickory Hill Mission Support Site
- Leghorn Mission Support Site
