= Leghorn Mission Support Site =

- Attapeu Province, Laos

Site information
- Type: Army

Location
- Coordinates: 14.782°N 107.415°E

Site history
- Built: 1967
- In use: 1967-72
- Battles/wars: Vietnam War

Garrison information
- Occupants: MACV-SOG

Leghorn Mission Support Site (also known as Leghorn MSS, Eagle's Nest, Gibralter or Golf-5) was a MACV-SOG base located northwest of Đắk Tô Base Camp, in Attapeu Province, Laos.

== History ==
The base was located on a steep and narrow ridgeline, approximately 10 km west of the Vietnam-Laos border and 43 km northwest of Đắk Tô Base Camp.

The base was first established on 15 January 1967 as an operations base and radio relay site to allow SOG teams to remain in contact while conducting operations in southern Laos. The hillside on which it was constructed was so steep as to render the base practically impervious to ground attack or small arms or mortar fire. While intended as a temporary facility, Leghorn remained in use for five years.

== Current use ==
The base has reverted to jungle.

== See also ==
- Hickory Hill Mission Support Site
- Sledgehammer Mission Support Site
