= Hill 950 =

US military base during the Vietnam War

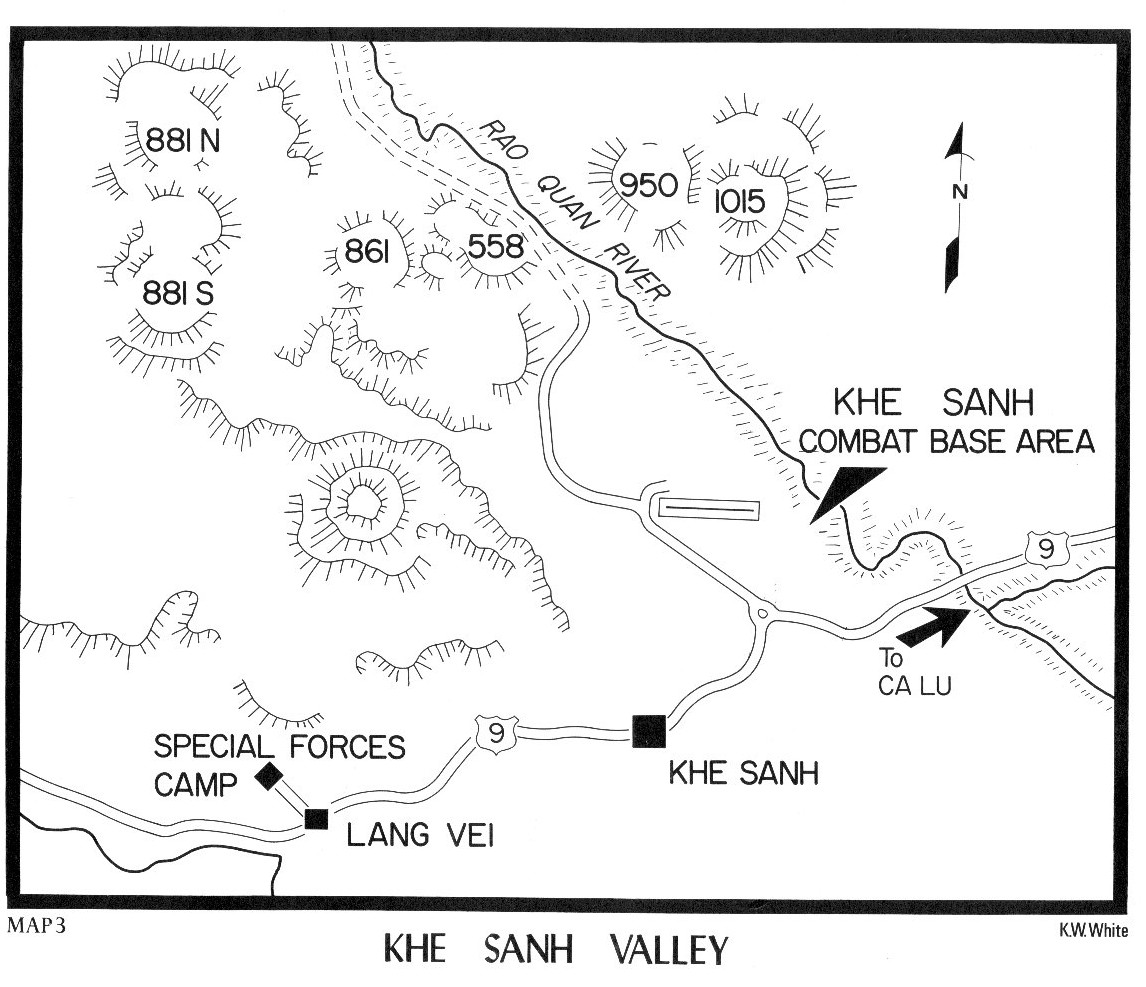
- Map showing location of U.S. bases around the Khe Sanh area

Site information
- Type: Marines/Army

Location
- Coordinates: 16.6885°N 106.725°E

Site history
- Built: 1966
- In use: 1966-71
- Battles/wars: Vietnam War; Battle of Khe Sanh

Garrison information
- Occupants: 3rd Marine Division; MACV-SOG

Hill 950 (also known as Hickory Hill Mission Support Site, Hickory Hill MSS, Hickory Hill Radio Relay Site or Lemon Tree) was a U.S. Marine Corps and MACV-SOG base located north of Khe Sanh, in Quảng Trị Province.

== History ==
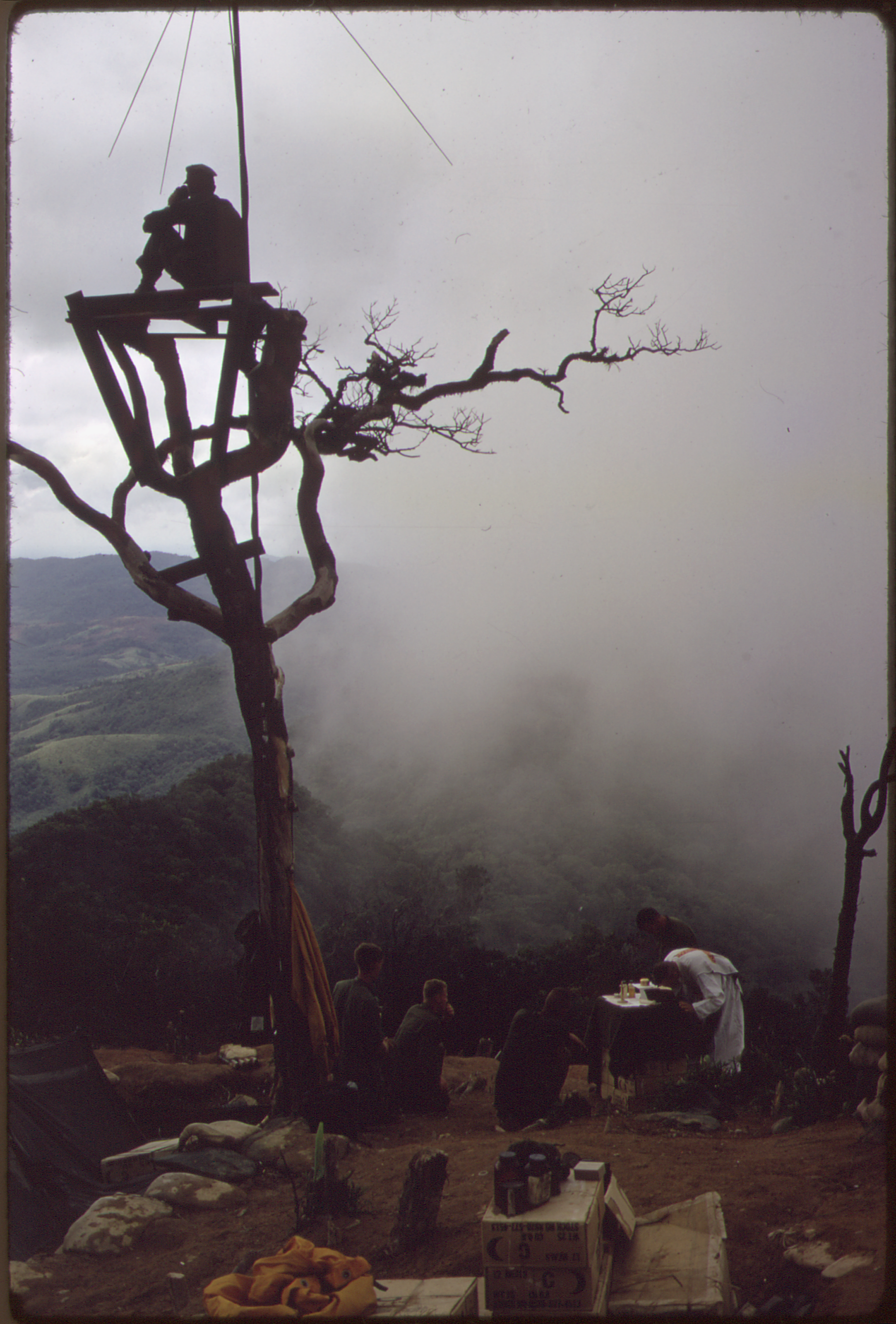
A Marine stands watch during mass on Hill 950

The base was located approximately 3.5 km north of Khe Sanh.

The base was first established by the Marines in late 1966. In May 1967 the site was defended by a company from the 1st Battalion, 26th Marines. On the morning of 6 June a People's Army of Vietnam (PAVN) force attacked the base, but were forced back for the loss of 6 Marines and 10 PAVN killed. CPL John Roland Burke would be posthumously awarded the Navy Cross for his actions during the battle.

In September 1969 as part of Operation Keystone Cardinal the 4th Marines abandoned the base as part of the withdrawal of the 3rd Marine Division from Vietnam.

The base was later used as an operations base and radio relay site to allow SOG teams to remain in contact while on operations in Laos and to monitor sensors emplaced on the Ho Chi Minh Trail. The base also housed the Army Security Agency's (ASA) Explorer VHF automated interception system linked to the Phu Bai Combat Base.

On the morning of 4 June 1971 a PAVN force on Hill 1015 attacked the base with small arms and mortars. Four wounded U.S. servicemen, including the base commander and several Bru commandos were evacuated by helicopter at midday on 4 June. The helicopter was hit by PAVN fire and had to make an emergency landing and the occupants were transferred to another helicopter. Additional helicopters arrived at the base to evacuate U.S. personnel, but Sergeants Jon R. Cavaiani and Robert Jones chose to remain to defend the base with some 20 Bru. The top-secret Explorer system was destroyed with thermal charges as the base was evacuated. On the morning of 5 June the PAVN launched a final assault, overrunning the base, while many of the Bru managed to escape, Cavaianai and Jones held out in a bunker until Jones was killed and Cavaiani was taken prisoner. Cavaiani was released in April 1973, he would be awarded the Medal of Honor for his actions in the battle.

== Current use ==
The base has reverted to jungle.

== See also ==
- Leghorn Mission Support Site
- Sledgehammer Mission Support Site
