= SSPL =

SSPL may refer to:

- Sacred Sword of the Patriots League
- Saratoga Springs Public Library, Saratoga Springs, New York
- Science & Society Picture Library of the Science Museum, London
- Server Side Public License, a software license
- Solid State Physics Laboratory
- Space Shuttle Payload Launcher, a DRAGONSat satellite
- Swiss Science Prize Latsis, a basic science award
