= Franklin D. Miller =

United States Army Medal of Honor recipient

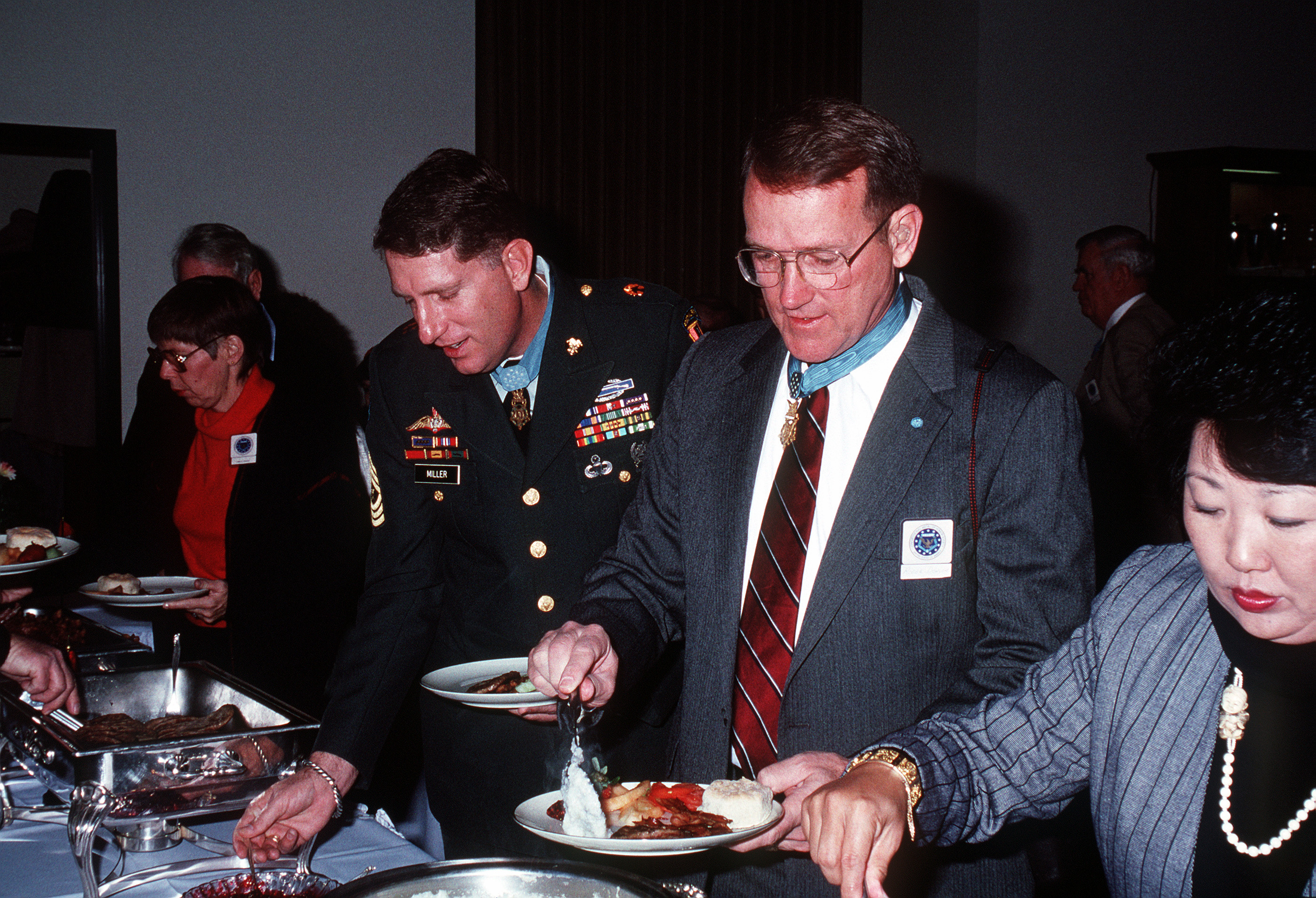
- Army Medal of Honor
- Born: January 27, 1945; Elizabeth City, North Carolina, US
- Died: June 30, 2000 (aged 55)
- Military career
- Allegiance: United States
- Branch: United States Army
- Service years: 1965 – 1992 (27 years)
- Rank: Command Sergeant Major
- Units: 5th Special Forces Group; MACV-SOG
- Conflicts: Vietnam War
- Awards: Medal of Honor; Silver Star; Bronze Star (2); Purple Heart (6)
- Other work: U.S. Department of Veterans Affairs benefits counselor

Command Sergeant Major Franklin Douglas "Doug" Miller (January 27, 1945 – June 30, 2000) was a United States Army Special Forces staff sergeant during the Vietnam War who was awarded the United States military's highest decoration—the Medal of Honor—for his actions above and beyond the call of duty on January 5, 1970. He was also awarded a Silver Star, two Bronze Stars, and six Purple Hearts during his six years service in Southeast Asia.

A native of Elizabeth City, North Carolina, Miller eventually retired from the U.S. Army as a command sergeant major in 1992 before becoming a benefits counselor for the United States Department of Veterans Affairs.

== Biography ==
Miller joined the U.S. Army from Albuquerque, New Mexico, on February 17, 1965. After basic training and advanced infantry training, he deployed in March 1966 to Vietnam. Assigned to the 1st Cavalry Division, he operated in An Khe which is located in the Central Highlands of South Vietnam. He undertook two years of airborne infantry reconnaissance work in Vietnam before volunteering for the U.S. Army Special Forces course at Ft. Bragg, North Carolina. After completing the course, he was first assigned to the 5th Special Forces Group in Vietnam. Miller also became a member of the elite and highly-secretive Military Assistance Command, Vietnam - Studies and Observations Group (MAC-V SOG). (Note: MAC-V SOG was a joint unconventional warfare task force created by the Joint Chiefs of Staff as a subsidiary command of the Military Assistance Command, Vietnam (MACV). The unit would eventually consist primarily of personnel from the United States Army Special Forces. Others assigned to MACV-SOG came from the United States Navy SEALs, the United States Air Force, the Central Intelligence Agency (CIA) Special Activities Division, and elements of the United States Marine Corps Force Reconnaissance units. The Studies and Observations Group was in fact controlled and missioned by the Special Assistant for Counterinsurgency and Special Activities (SACSA) and his staff at the Pentagon. After 1967 "administrative" support was provided by HQ 5th Special Forces Group (Airborne), 1st Special Forces, Vietnam; SOG was never assigned to or missioned by HQ 5th SFG(Abn).)

On January 5, 1970, Staff Sergeant Miller, who was administratively a member of the 5th Special Forces Group, was leading a joint American-South Vietnam Montagnard tribesmen (nicknamed "Yards") long-range reconnaissance patrol operating deep within enemy-controlled territory in and from Kontum Province, Vietnam when his seven-man team was attacked by a platoon size North Vietnamese reconnaissance force in Laos after one of his Montagnard team members tripped an enemy booby trap wounding five team members. Miller was wounded in the chest, and single-handedly held off an enemy assault, and arranged for a helicopter extraction of his surviving comrades, and again fought off the enemy alone until relief arrived; four team members were killed and all were wounded.

For his actions during the battle, in which he was seriously wounded, he was presented the Medal of Honor by President Richard M. Nixon at a White House ceremony on June 15, 1971. Miller retold the story of that day in Vietnam, along with other experiences from his career in the Army Special Forces, in his memoir, Reflections of a Warrior: Six Years as a Green Beret in Vietnam. After receiving the medal, Miller asked to be returned to his unit in Vietnam. During his years (1966–1967, 1968–1972) in Vietnam, he had taken part in many secret operations and raids which included going across the borders of Cambodia and Laos. He left the Republic of Vietnam in November 1972.

Miller retired from the U.S. Army on December 1, 1992, as a command sergeant major, and joined the Veterans Administration where he worked as a benefits counselor. He died in 2000 at age 55 from cancer and was cremated, with his ashes scattered in New Mexico. Miller was survived by a son, Joshua; a daughter, Danielle; and a brother, Walter, of Palmer, Alaska, who is also a retired command sergeant major of the Army Special Forces. The Franklin D. Miller Trust was established to provide material support for his two children.

Range 37, part of Fort Bragg, North Carolina, was rededicated in Miller's honor in 2002.

== Medal of Honor citation ==
Miller's Medal of Honor citation reads:

Rank and organization: Staff Sergeant, U.S. Army, 5th Special Forces Group, 1st Special Forces
Place and date: Kontum Province, Republic of Vietnam
Entered service at: Albuquerque, New Mexico
Born: 27 January 1945

For conspicuous gallantry and intrepidity in action at the risk of his life above and beyond the call of duty. S/Sgt. Miller, 5th Special Forces Group, distinguished himself while serving as team leader of an American-Vietnamese long-range reconnaissance patrol operating deep within enemy controlled territory. Leaving the helicopter insertion point, the patrol moved forward on its mission. Suddenly, 1 of the team members tripped a hostile booby trap which wounded 4 soldiers. S/Sgt. Miller, knowing that the explosion would alert the enemy, quickly administered first aid to the wounded and directed the team into positions across a small stream bed at the base of a steep hill. Within a few minutes, S/Sgt. Miller saw the lead element of what he estimated to be a platoon-size enemy force moving toward his location. Concerned for the safety of his men, he directed the small team to move up the hill to a more secure position. He remained alone, separated from the patrol, to meet the attack. S/Sgt. Miller single-handedly repulsed 2 determined attacks by the numerically superior enemy force and caused them to withdraw in disorder. He rejoined his team, established contact with a forward air controller and arranged the evacuation of his patrol. However, the only suitable extraction location in the heavy jungle was a bomb crater some 150 meters from the team location. S/Sgt. Miller reconnoitered the route to the crater and led his men through the enemy controlled jungle to the extraction site. As the evacuation helicopter hovered over the crater to pick up the patrol, the enemy launched a savage automatic weapon and rocket-propelled grenade attack against the beleaguered team, driving off the rescue helicopter. S/Sgt. Miller led the team in a valiant defense which drove back the enemy in its attempt to overrun the small patrol. Although seriously wounded and with every man in his patrol a casualty, S/Sgt. Miller moved forward to again single-handedly meet the hostile attackers. From his forward exposed position, S/Sgt. Miller gallantly repelled 2 attacks by the enemy before a friendly relief force reached the patrol location. S/Sgt. Miller's gallantry, intrepidity in action, and selfless devotion to the welfare of his comrades are in keeping with the highest traditions of the military service and reflect great credit on him, his unit, and the U.S. Army."

Richard M. Nixon

== Military awards ==
Miller's military decorations and awards include:

Badge	Combat Infantry Badge		
1st row	Medal of Honor		Silver Star
2nd row	Bronze Star Medal (2) with "V" Device and Bronze Oak Leaf Cluster	Purple Heart with Silver Oak Leaf Cluster	Air Medal
3rd Row	Army Commendation Medal	Army Good Conduct Medal (9 awards)	National Defense Service Medal with 3/16" bronze star
4th Row	Vietnam Service Medal with two 3/16" silver stars and four 3/16" bronze stars	NCO Professional Development Ribbon	Army Service Medal
5th Row	Army Overseas Service Ribbon	Vietnam Military Merit Medal	Republic of Vietnam Campaign Medal with 1960- device
Badges	Special Forces Tab		Master Parachutist Badge

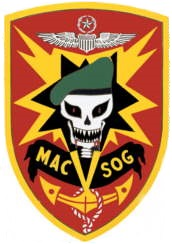
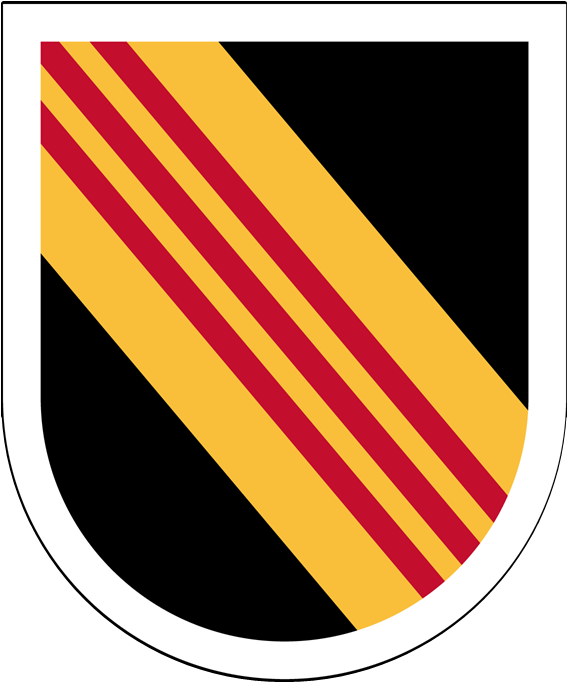

Units	MACV-SOG	5th Special Forces Group
Rank	Command Sergeant Major (E-9)	

== See also ==
- List of Medal of Honor recipients for the Vietnam War
- 5th Special Forces Group
- Military Assistance Command, Vietnam - Studies and Observations Group (MAC-V SOG)
