= Jon R. Cavaiani =

US Army Medal of Honor recipient (1943–2014)

Jon Robert Cavaiani
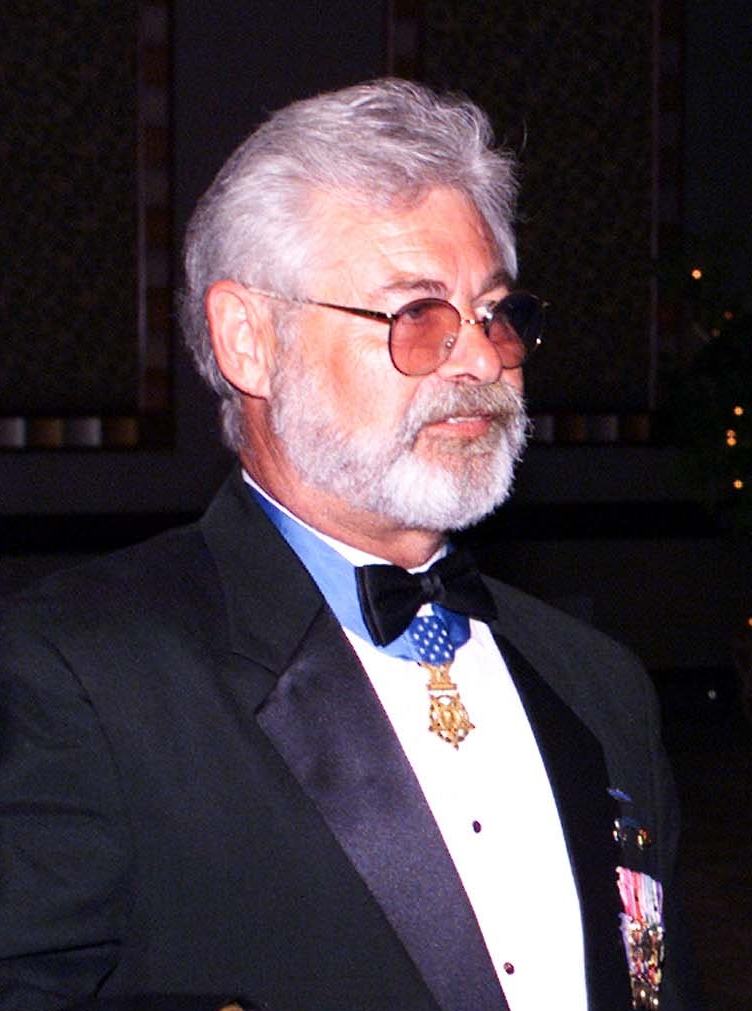
- Cavaiani in 2004
- Born: 2 August 1943; Murphys, County Offaly, Ireland
- Died: 29 July 2014 (aged 70); Stanford, California, United States
- Burial place: Arlington National Cemetery
- Military career
- Allegiance: United States
- Branch: United States Army
- Service years: 1969–1990
- Rank: Sergeant Major
- Units: 5th Special Forces Group; 10th Special Forces Group; MACV-SOG; Delta Force
- Conflicts: Vietnam War
- Awards: Medal of Honor; Legion of Merit; Bronze Star; Purple Heart

Jonathan Robert Cavaiani (2 August 1943 – 29 July 2014) was a United States Army soldier and a recipient of the United States military's highest decoration, the Medal of Honor, for his actions in the Vietnam War.

== Biography ==
Cavaiani was born in Murphys, County Offaly, Ireland, and went to England a short time afterwards.

He left England for the United States in 1947, and in 1953 moved to the small farming community of Ballico, California to be with his stepfather, Ugo Cavaiani.

In 1961 Ugo formally adopted Jon and in 1968 he became a naturalized citizen of the United States. In 1969, Cavaiani joined the US Army. In 1970, he was deployed to Vietnam with the Special Forces and by 4 June 1971, was serving as a staff sergeant in Task Force 1 Advisory Element, United States Army Vietnam (USARV) Training Advisory Group. This unit was formerly known as Command and Control North, MACV-SOG. On that day, in the Republic of Vietnam, his platoon came under intense enemy attack at Hill 950. Cavaiani organized the unit's defense and, when evacuation by helicopter became necessary, he voluntarily stayed on the ground and directed the aircraft, which successfully evacuated most of the platoon. Cavaiani and a small group were left behind. During a major enemy attack the next morning, he ordered the remaining men to escape while he stayed and provided suppressive fire to cover their retreat. He was captured and spent the next two years as a prisoner of war.

Jon R. Cavaiani was released during Operation Homecoming in March 1973. President Gerald Ford presented Cavaiani with the Medal of Honor during a ceremony on 12 December 1974.

His other assignments included tours of duty in the Middle East, South America, Europe and Southeast Asia.

Cavaiani spent three years in Berlin, Germany as the Senior Operations Sergeant Major for British, French and U.S. Forces. From August 1980 to May 1983, Cavaiani served with the 10th Special Forces Group at Fort Devens, Massachusetts, followed by service with the 11th Special Forces Group at Fort Meade, Maryland from summer 1983 to summer 1984. In 1984 Cavaiani volunteered for and served with Flight Concepts Division at Fort Eulis. He retired from the Army in May 1990.

Upon retiring, Cavaiani served as the 6th region director of the Congressional Medal of Honor Society.

He graduated with honors from the culinary arts program in Columbia, California, where he and his wife Barbara lived.

His numerous military decorations include the nation's highest award for valor, the Army Medal of Honor, Legion of Merit, Bronze Star Medal with 'V' for Valor device and one Oak Leaf Cluster, Purple Heart with one Oak Leaf Cluster, Meritorious Service Medal, Joint Service Commendation Medal, Army Commendation Medal with 'V' for Valor device and three Oak Leaf Clusters and the Prisoner of War Medal.

Additionally, he was entitled to wear the Combat Infantryman Badge, the Pathfinder Badge and Master Parachutist Badge.

Cavaiani was a freefall and static line jumpmaster with over 5,000 jumps all over the world.

Cavaiani died on 29 July 2014, four days before his 71st birthday, in Stanford, California. He had myelodysplastic syndrome. He is buried in Arlington National Cemetery.

== Military awards ==
- Combat Infantryman Badge
- Master Parachutist Badge
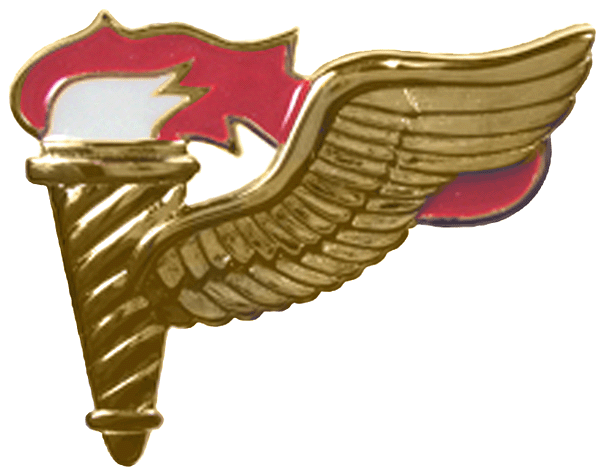
- Pathfinder Badge
- Special Forces Tab
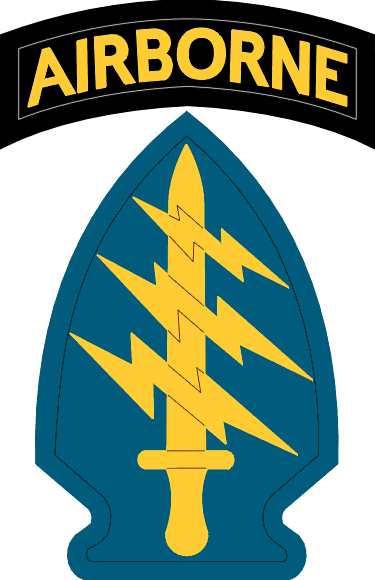
- U.S. Army Special Forces Combat Service Identification Badge
- Medal of Honor
- Legion of Merit
- Bronze Star Medal with "V" device and oak leaf cluster
- Purple Heart with oak leaf cluster
- Meritorious Service Medal
- Army Commendation Medal with "V" device and 3 oak leaf clusters
- Army Achievement Medal with oak leaf cluster
- Prisoner of War Medal
- Army Presidential Unit Citation
- Army Meritorious Unit Commendation
- Good Conduct Medal with clasp
- Army of Occupation Medal with "Germany" clasp
- National Defense Service Medal
- Vietnam Service Medal with 4 campaign stars
- Non-Commissioned Officer Professional Development Ribbon
- Army Service Ribbon
- Military Merit Medal (Vietnam)
- Vietnam Cross of Gallantry with palm
- Armed Forces Honor Medal
- Vietnam Civil Actions Medal
- Republic of Vietnam Campaign Medal

=== Medal of Honor citation ===

Staff Sergeant Cavaiani's official Medal of Honor citation reads:

S/Sgt. Cavaiani distinguished himself by conspicuous gallantry and intrepidity at the risk of life above and beyond the call of duty in action in the Republic of Vietnam on 4 and 5 June 1971 while serving as a platoon leader to a security platoon providing security for an isolated radio relay site located within enemy-held territory. On the morning of 4 June 1971, the entire camp came under an intense barrage of enemy small arms, automatic weapons, rocket-propelled grenade and mortar fire from a superior size enemy force. S/Sgt. Cavaiani acted with complete disregard for his personal safety as he repeatedly exposed himself to heavy enemy fire in order to move about the camp's perimeter directing the platoon's fire and rallying the platoon in a desperate fight for survival. S/Sgt. Cavaiani also returned heavy suppressive fire upon the assaulting enemy force during this period with a variety of weapons. When the entire platoon was to be evacuated, S/Sgt. Cavaiani unhesitatingly volunteered to remain on the ground and direct the helicopters into the landing zone. S/Sgt. Cavaiani was able to direct the first 3 helicopters in evacuating a major portion of the platoon. Due to intense increase in enemy fire, S/Sgt. Cavaiani was forced to remain at the camp overnight where he calmly directed the remaining platoon members in strengthening their defenses. On the morning of 5 June, a heavy ground fog restricted visibility. The superior size enemy force launched a major ground attack in an attempt to completely annihilate the remaining small force. The enemy force advanced in 2 ranks, first firing a heavy volume of small arms automatic weapons and rocket-propelled grenade fire while the second rank continuously threw a steady barrage of hand grenades at the beleaguered force. S/Sgt. Cavaiani returned a heavy barrage of small arms and hand grenade fire on the assaulting enemy force but was unable to slow them down. He ordered the remaining platoon members to attempt to escape while he provided them with cover fire. With one last courageous exertion, S/Sgt. Cavaiani recovered a machine gun, stood up, completely exposing himself to the heavy enemy fire directed at him, and began firing the machine gun in a sweeping motion along the two ranks of advancing enemy soldiers. Through S/Sgt. Cavaiani's valiant efforts with complete disregard for his safety, the majority of the remaining platoon members were able to escape. While inflicting severe losses on the advancing enemy force, S/Sgt. Cavaiani was wounded numerous times. S/Sgt. Cavaiani's conspicuous gallantry, extraordinary heroism and intrepidity at the risk of his life, above and beyond the call of duty, were in keeping with the highest traditions of the military service and reflect great credit upon himself and the U.S. Army.

President Gerald Ford presented Cavaiani with the medal during a ceremony on 12 December 1974.

Cavaiani later reached the rank of sergeant major before retiring from the Army in 1990.

== See also ==
- List of Medal of Honor recipients for the Vietnam War
- List of Delta Force members
