= Ted Braden =

American Special Force Commando during the Vietnam War

Theodore Burdette Braden, Jr.
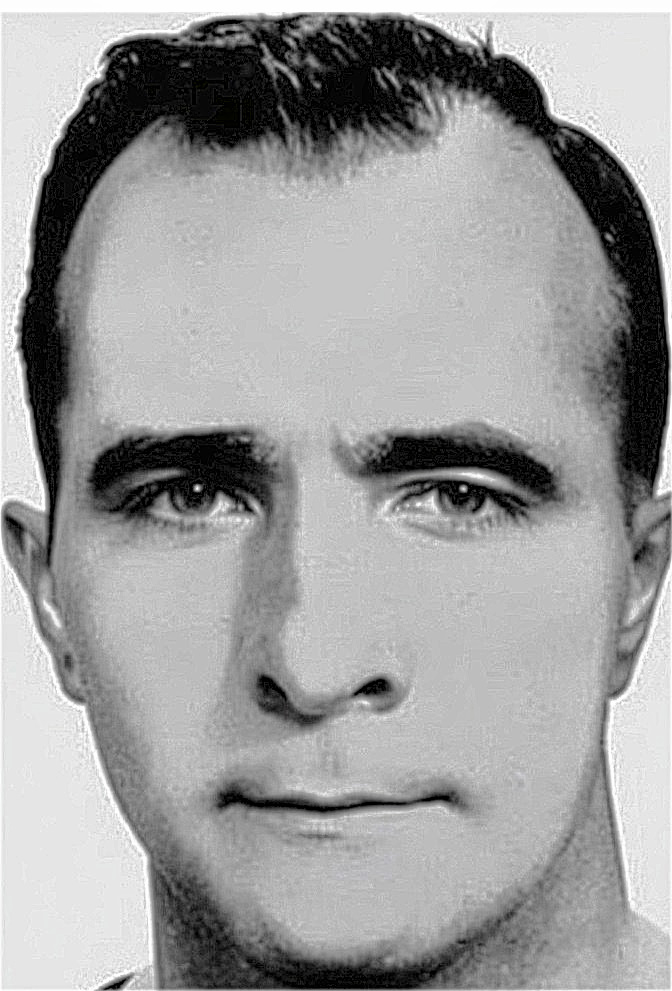
- Braden's military identification card photo
- Born: September 24, 1928; Ohio, United States
- Died: June 21, 2007 (aged 78)
- Military career
- Allegiance: United States; Republic of the Congo
- Branch: United States Army, United States Air Force
- Service years: 1944–1966 (United States); 1967 (Republic of the Congo)
- Rank: Sergeant First Class
- Nickname: "Ted"
- Units: 501st Parachute Infantry Regiment, 101st Airborne Division, MACV-SOG
- Conflicts: World War II: Ardennes-Alsace; Central Europe; Vietnam War: Operation Steel Tiger
- Awards: Bronze Star Medal (2); Purple Heart (2); Croix de Guerre (Belgium); Master Parachutist Badge; Vietnam Gallantry Cross; Vietnam Service Medal; Vietnam Campaign Medal

Theodore Burdette Braden Jr. (September 24, 1928 – June 21, 2007) was a Special Forces commando during the Vietnam War, master skydiver, and a suspect in the D.B. Cooper hijacking.

== Military career ==
Born in Ohio, Braden first joined the military at the age of 16 in 1944, serving with the 101st Airborne during World War 2. Braden would stay in the Army until 1949, rising to the rank of 2nd Lieutenant. In 1954, Braden joined the Air Force with the intention of becoming a pilot, but he resigned later that same year during pre-flight training. He re-enlisted in the Army in 1958 becoming a member of the Army's Sport Parachute Club, known at the time as the Golden Arrows, but later known as the Golden Knights. He eventually became one of the military's leading parachutists, often representing the Army in international skydiving tournaments, and his military records list him as having made 911 jumps. During the 1960s, Braden was a team leader within the MACVSOG, a classified commando unit of Green Berets which conducted unconventional warfare operations during the Vietnam War. He also served as a military skydiving instructor, teaching HALO jumping techniques to members of Project Delta. Braden spent 23 months in Vietnam, conducting classified operations within both North and South Vietnam, as well as Laos and Cambodia.

In October, 1966, efforts were made to place wiretaps in North Vietnamese Army (NVA) base camps using specialized CIA taps with rubber coating placed over the wire to avoid detection. The first successful wiretap was conducted by MACV-SOG's Recon Team Colorado, led by Braden, near the western end of the DMZ. During this same mission, RT Arizona was completely wiped out when they were inserted directly on top of an entrenched NVA unit. Despite this loss and others incurred as wiretapping efforts continued, the wiretaps placed by SOG members provided an invaluable intelligence source.

In December 1966, Braden deserted his unit in Vietnam and made his way to the Republic of the Congo to serve as a mercenary, but only served there a short time before being arrested by CIA agents and taken back to the United States for a court-martial. Despite having committed a capital offense by deserting in wartime, Braden was given an honorable discharge and barred from re-enlisting in the military in exchange for his continued secrecy about the MACVSOG program.

== Later life ==
Braden was profiled in the October 1967 issue of Ramparts Magazine, wherein he was described by fellow Special Forces veteran and journalist Don Duncan as being someone with a "secret death wish" who "continually places himself in unnecessary danger but always seems to get away with it", specifically referring to Braden's disregard for military skydiving safety regulations. Duncan also claimed that during Braden's time in Vietnam, he was "continuously involved in shady deals to make money." Following his military discharge in 1967, the details of Braden's life are largely unknown, but at the time of the hijacking he was a truck driver for Consolidated Freightways, which was headquartered in Vancouver, Washington, just across the Columbia River from Portland and not far from the suspected dropzone of Ariel, Washington. It is also known that at some point in the early 1970s he was investigated by the FBI for stealing $250,000 during a trucking scam he had allegedly devised, but he was never charged for this supposed crime. In 1980, Braden was indicted by a Federal grand jury for driving an 18-wheeler full of stolen goods from Arizona to Massachusetts, but it is unknown whether there was a conviction in that case. Two years later, Braden was arrested in Pennsylvania for driving a stolen vehicle with fictitious plates and for having no driver's license. Braden eventually ended up being sent to Federal prison at some point during the late 1980s, serving time in Pennsylvania, but the precise crime is unknown.

== D.B. Cooper suspect ==
Despite his ability as a soldier, he was not well liked personally and was described by a family member as "the perfect combination of high intelligence and criminality". He was believed by many within the Special Forces community, both at the time of the D.B. Cooper hijacking and in subsequent years, to have been Cooper. From his time working covert operations in Vietnam, he likely would have possessed the then-classified knowledge about the ability and proper specifications for jumping from a 727, perhaps having done it himself on MACVSOG missions. Physically, Braden's military records list him at 5 ft 8 in (173 cm), which is shorter than the height description of at least 5 ft 10 in (178 cm) given by the two flight attendants, but this military measurement would have been taken in his stocking feet and he may have appeared somewhat taller in shoes. However, he possessed a dark complexion from years of outdoor military service, had short dark hair, a medium athletic build, and was 43 years of age at the time of the hijacking, which are features all in line with the descriptions of Cooper.
