= Sacred Sword of the Patriots League =

CIA Vietnam War black operation

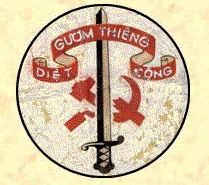
MACV-SOG-designed insignia of the Sacred Sword of the Patriots League

The Sacred Sword of the Patriots League (SSPL) (Mặt trận gươm thiêng ái quốc) was a sustained black operation that originated in the Central Intelligence Agency and was carried out by the Military Assistance Command, Vietnam – Studies and Observations Group (MACV-SOG) during the Vietnam War. It involved a combination of psychological warfare (PSYWAR) and psychological operations (PSYOP), today known as military information support operations (MISO).

The SSPL was "planned and implemented beginning in April 1963," though it continued to develop through 1968. It formed the centerpiece of various PSYOP directed against North Vietnam, which were codenamed Humidor. It attempted to convince the people—and sometimes the government—of North Vietnam of the existence of an autonomous, non-communist society within North Vietnam. Creating and promulgating the "legend" of the SSPL required U.S. Special Forces to build on PSYWAR techniques established by the Office of Strategic Services (OSS) during World War II. Some historians believe the SSPL managed to divert the attention of North Vietnamese officials enough to justify its expenses and manpower. However, the program is not known for any particularly noteworthy successes and it suffered from a lack of direction regarding its ultimate goals. Recurring disagreements between some military leaders in Vietnam and policymakers in Washington kept the program from ever becoming an actual counterrevolutionary force within North Vietnam. It was mostly disbanded in 1968 following an early round of negotiations in what became the Paris Peace Accords of 1973.

== Origins ==
=== U.S. historical precedent ===
The SSPL drew from a short history of elaborate deceptions in U.S. military history. Historian John Plaster asserts that the MACV-SOG branch which ran the SSPL was "patterned after the old OSS Morale Operations Division," formed by William Donavan in 1943. The comparison is apt, as both largely relied on deceptive radio operations, fraudulent letters, and distribution of leaflets. The SSPL also benefited from the experiences of Herbert Weisshart, who was appointed Deputy Head of MACV-SOG's PSYOP at its inception. Unlike most SOG commanders, Weisshart arrived with experience PSYOP. "Part of a six-man psychological warfare team dispatched to Taiwan in 1952, he had been instrumental in coordinating leaflet drops and radio play against China in support of one of the Central Intelligence Agency's first notional resistance campaigns." Still operating in 1963, Weisshart's fictional resistance movement against mainland China became the CIA's "longest running notional campaign."

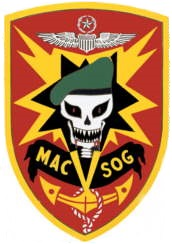
MACV-SOG forces wore nondescript uniforms, but this was their unofficial insignia

=== The "Legend" of the SSPL ===
The American founders of the SSPL chose to root it in popular Vietnamese history. The name hearkened back to the 15th century Emperor of Vietnam, Lê Lợi, who led a revolt against Chinese rule. His guerrilla warfare tactics succeeded in winning Vietnam's independence from China after 1,000 years of subservience. Sometime after the war, Lê Lợi's famous sword was taken from him by a turtle. The Emperor declared that the sword had been entrusted to him for the duration of the war, only to be taken by the turtle of the Lake of the Returned Sword after his victory.

The story of Lê Lợi fulfilled Weisshart's declared goal of pursuing "a legend and an easily recognized symbol upon which to base a notional resistance movement in North Vietnam." It was a story that "Every school child in North Vietnam knew." Knowing that North Vietnam relied on Chinese aid, SOG framed the SSPL as anti-Chinese nationalist movement, while steering clearly making ideological statements that might lose some North Vietnamese support. The legend also emphasized the historical union between South and North Vietnam against any kind of imperial aggression.

According to the legend, the SSPL was founded by Lê Lợi admirer Lê Quốc Hùng in response to the communist land reforms of 1953. It supposedly had 10,000 members and held its first national Congress in 1961. The SSPL opposed all foreign involvement in North and South Vietnam.

=== Early development ===
In April 1961, President John F. Kennedy demanded the establishment of "networks of resistance" in North Vietnam. It took government officials some time to build the resources necessary to cross the Vietnamese Demilitarized Zone. Responsibility for PSYOP against North Vietnam initially went to the CIA, which continued to play a supporting role throughout the war. In 1962 the CIA identified Hmong tribesmen as worthy recruits for North Vietnamese resistance. But by the spring of 1963 their pilot program had a total of just eight recruits. CIA Deputy Chief and Chief of Operations in Saigon, William Colby, chose Herbert Weisshart to expand North Vietnamese resistance and PSYWAR operations beginning in March 1963.

Weisshart played a role in implementing the CINCPAC Operations Plan (OPLAN) 34-63 for PSYOP directed towards North Vietnam, which was later endorsed by Secretary of Defense Robert McNamara. "McNamara also desired the development of a notional (fictitious) Vietnamese national liberation movement, which would be the ostensible sponsor of the operations. That was, after all, what the North Vietnamese were doing in the South." The final plan, OPLAN 34Alpha, called for the military "to use all available media and practical means...phantom resistance movements, and psychological development of actual resistance."

A 1966 letter from Major General Richard Abbey, the Deputy Chief of Staff MACV, crisply conveys the thought process behind the SSPL's operations. "The SSPL is the denial mechanism for disclaiming U.S. and Republic of Vietnam sponsorship of Operation Plan 34A activities...The cover story for the SSPL will be that it is the action arm of the front and that it receives it[s] funds from the front. By avoiding public announcement of responsibility for OPLAN 34A operations the SSPL group will not be forced to provide answers to such questions as: Where did the boats come from? Who paid for them? Where are they based? SSPL broadcasts, which the local Saigon residents might hear, can be explained by saying that the SSPL rented air from a local station." The SSPL was conceived as the covert U.S. counterpoint to recognized North Vietnamese support of the Viet Cong in South Vietnam. The main difference is that the SSPL's existence was "notional, whereas the Viet Cong was real.

As the mandate for PSYOP against North Vietnam expanded, U.S. officials decided that the large force required would be better left to the Pentagon instead of the CIA. The transfer, which took place in November 1963, was termed Operation Switchback. Herb Weisshert was transferred to the newly formed MACV-SOG, with operation described in OPLAN 34Alpha to start on 1 February 1964.

=== The SSPL and the MACV-SOG mission ===
According to Gordon L. Rottman, who served in MACV-SOG, U.S. Special Forces had five primary duties in the Vietnam War:

- Cross Border Operations to disrupt the Viet Cong, Khmer Rouge, Pathet Lao and NVA
- Running Bright Light Operations to rescue Americans in North Vietnam
- Training and dispatching agents into North Vietnam to run resistance movements and intelligence-collection
- Black PSYOP
- Gray PSYOP

The SSPL was the focal point of Black PSYOP within MACV-SOG, which was an elite special forces unit that drew from all branches of the military as well as the CIA. MACV-SOG spread the SSPL message by air, boat, ground forces, and telecommunications. The Psychological Operations Group that developed the SSPL was instructed "to advise, assist, and control psychological operations of Strategic Technical Service for the purpose of establishing a climate of opinion in North Vietnam -- [Words Illegible] -- SO/STS operations, supporting SOG/STS physical destruction operations, and exerting PSYOP pressure on the North Vietnamese to erase support for activity in the Republic of Vietnam." By 1967, SOG dedicated about 150 members of its staff to covert propaganda, in addition to employing many more Vietnamese citizens for their language skills, cultural understanding and ability to act as members of the SSPL.

== SSPL Propaganda ==
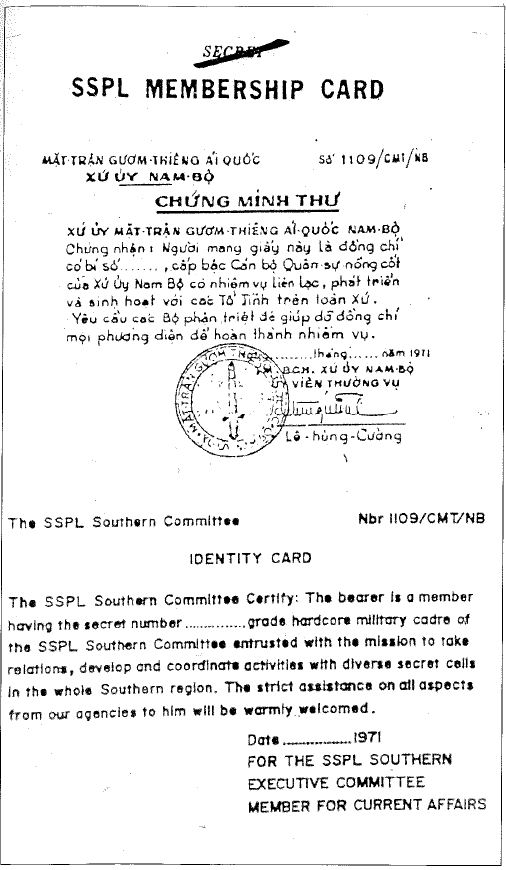

=== SSPL leaflet campaign ===
MACV-SOG spent significant resources distributing leaflets wherever the enemy was likely to find them. Leaflets chiefly served to demoralize the enemy. During the Vietnam War, this was accomplished at least as much by the volume as the quality of the messages. A typical "MACV PSYOP/POLWAR Newsletter" from August 1969 records 683 million leaflets dropped that month alone, though leaflets dropped by SOG into North Vietnam could be numbered in the tens of millions. Leaflets could be left on corpses, blasted out of timed cannons or dropped from aircraft. (Spies and Commandos 106) While many of these leaflets were part of the Chiêu Hồi defection campaign, others specifically referenced the SSPL resistance. SOG depended on a cadre of North Vietnamese defectors to translate and perfect these messages.

Assessments of the effectiveness of leaflets varied. Historian Charles Reske, who annotated the command histories of MACV-SOG, comments, "Dropping leaflets was one of the least successful PSYOP. From beginning to end MACSOG dropped tons of leaflets in Laos, Cambodia, and North Vietnam with virtually no effect." To complicate matters, SOG forces sometimes tipped their hand by dropping the SSPL leaflets from discernibly American aircraft. However, SSPL leaflets may have been more effective than others because they were used in especially creative ways. Some were placed on North Vietnamese corpses in the hopes that fellow soldiers would be demoralized upon finding that their comrade was a member of the SSPL. In addition to leaflets, SOG even developed SSPL postage stamps to give the impression of the prevalence of the resistance throughout North Vietnam. Regardless of the effectiveness of the leaflets in winning support, they informed the North Vietnamese people that resistance to the regime was possible and helped distract their government from fighting the real war.

=== Voice of the Sacred Sword of the Patriots League (VSSPL) ===
The Voice of the Sacred Sword of the Patriots League (VSSPL) began broadcasting into North Vietnam in April 1965. The branch responsible for the broadcasts, SOG OP-33, later designated OP-39, purported to be broadcasting from within North Vietnam. Instead, the signal came from a 20-kW transmitter in Thu Duc, near Saigon.

The VSSPL found two main ways of increasing its listenership. First, through the Peanuts project, SOG distributed thousands of radios to the North Vietnamese. They distributed 10,000 in 1968 alone. These Japanese manufactured radios were designed to tune in VSSPL and other American stations while distorting North Vietnamese stations. They were inserted by various methods including reconnaissance teams, air-drops and boats. Second, the VSSPL used a variety of deceptive radio methods to subvert actual North Vietnamese broadcasts. These included "surfing" ("transmitting alongside a real station's frequency"), and "hitchhiking," ("com[ing] up on the same frequency as a real station was signing off and using its call sign").

True to the SSPL nationalist message, the station took a non-ideological approach that emphasized traditional Vietnamese values. After developing psychological profiles of the North Vietnamese, programming was targeted towards "various audiences such as fishermen, Catholics, farmers, and junior cadre. [It] called for carefully planned and executed actions, most of which were passive, like spreading news of the SSPL...It also offered the SSPL viewpoint on happenings in different parts of North Vietnam." VSSPL aimed to slowly break down respect for North Vietnamese leadership. One former VSSPL operator commented, "The 'Patriot' station pounded relentlessly at venal and immoral Communist cadres who not only diverted funds, but also seduced the young wives of NVA soldiers in the South...Our few reliable agents in the North then confirmed that those targeted by the clandestine radio were often relieved of their duties." In addition to attacking the North Vietnamese government, other broadcasts were directed towards encouraging fictional SSPL forces within North Vietnam. However, in deference to policymakers, the VSSPL never advocated regime change in North Vietnam.

The station had some success in gaining the ears of the people and even the soldiers in North Vietnam. One North Vietnamese officer, who defected to the South, claimed, "he and other members of his unit listened regularly to Radio Red Flag, Radio Saigon, and the Voice of the SSPL on their unit's radio. The men were evenly divided on whether the Red Flag and VSSPL broadcasts were genuine or not. He personally believed that the VSSPL was run by Colonel Ly Van Quoc, PAVN officer who had defected to the USSR, and that the Soviets provided the broadcast facilities." The North Vietnamese responded to U.S. PSYOP by counter-indoctrination and by discouraging any mention of enemy propaganda. The VSSPL continued to operate years after most of the SSPL was disbanded on November 1, 1968.

=== Black letters ===
A favorite technique of SOG was to send forged letters to North Vietnamese officials and loyalists in order draw suspicion towards them. Many of the letters, sometimes called poison pen letters, concerned alleged support for SSPL activities. SOG sent 50–100 such missives through a Hong Kong address per week, and up to 7,000 through Bangkok a year. SOG intercepted one communication indicating that a North Vietnamese general who received the letter "was inexplicably relieved of his divisional campaign and recalled to Hanoi." The sheer volume of letters allowed SOG to potentially incriminate untold numbers of North Vietnamese while enhancing the perception that the SSPL held many active members.

== Maritime operations and associated subversion efforts ==
=== Interdiction ===
SOG recruited SSPL members by kidnapping fishermen off the coast of North Vietnam. These operations, codenamed Mint (Maritime Interdictions) lasted from May 1964 to November 1968. SOG employed former inhabitants of North Vietnam, who spoke the correct dialects, to pose as SSPL members and seize the unsuspecting fishermen at gunpoint. Meanwhile, American members of SOG could travelled below deck where they would not be seen. The SOG Command History states: "Covert boat and landing team operations were conducted against the coast of North Vietnam to interdict enemy coastal shipping, capture prisoners for interrogations and psychological warfare exploitation, and to force North Vietnam to increase its coastal defenses." SOG patrolled the waters of North Vietnam with high-speed Norwegian "Nasty" boats.

Despite the program's moderate success, Mint operations sometimes ran afoul other programs. For example, In Loki missions, SOG used identical Nasty vessels to sink small Vietnamese boats, even though doing so accomplished little except angering fishermen. This problem persisted until 1968, demonstrating that the SSPL was not always fully integrated within SOG's broader efforts.

SOG significantly ramped up its maritime operation in 1967 through the Forae initiative, which included operation Urgency. During Urgency, a Naval Advisory Detachment acquired additional patrol boats, allowing them to scan the North Vietnam coast for vulnerable junkets nearly every day. These activities were also served to inflame paranoia within North Vietnam and force the government to assign additional resources to defend their coasts.

=== Paradise Island ===
Perhaps the most inventive of covert SOG operations was the creation of Paradise Island (Cu Lao Cham). After capturing the fishermen for indoctrination, the SSPL took them to this island, safely located within the waters of South Vietnam. In order to give the blindfolded captives the illusion that they were still off the coast of North Vietnam, they were quickly transferred to high speed boats. Paradise Island was chosen by SOG because it appeared nearly identical to the highlands of Vietnam. Prisoners were only allowed to see a portion of the island and were told that they were in a "liberated zone" within North Vietnam. Upon arriving the fishermen were found guilty of death, but the SSPL granted them clemency. The captives found their life under the SSPL in every way superior to life under communist government. They were provided with high-calorie foods, dental care and plenty of time for rest over the course of about three weeks.) The SSPL taught the fishermen the history of the resistance movement, allowed them opportunities to explain abuses and corruption under Hanoi government, and encouraged them to spread the message of the SSPL to their neighbors. Human intelligence gathered during these operations was later used for radio broadcasts, giving listeners the illusion that the SSPL had intimate knowledge of events within North Vietnam and that the broadcasts must be legitimate. By the end of the program, over 1,000 North Vietnamese had visited Paradise Island.

Visitors to Paradise Island were supplied with VSSPL-tuned radios and gift packages before leaving. Eventually they gave visitors two gift packages: one that was expected would be stolen by the communist government, and another to keep hidden.

The long indoctrination sessions allowed SSPL leaders plenty of time to judge the motivations and loyalties of the fishermen, as well as other prisoners who were sent to Paradise Island for SSPL sessions. Under project Borden, some were sent back to collect intelligence for SSPL. Even if they decided to tell their story to the North Vietnamese authorities, doing so would only enhance the image of the SSPL and spread knowledge of its mythical history. However, those who SSPL judged to be true-believing communists were returned as pseudo-intelligence agents. Unbeknownst to the released prisoners, their clothing and luggage were lined with SSPL membership cards or leaflets that would surely be found by North Vietnamese authorities. Any attempt by the ex-prisoner to explain his loyalty would naturally fall under intense suspicion.

Fishermen sent to Paradise Island were sometimes presented with the option of defecting to South Vietnam. Those who did so had to agree to be featured in news outlets such as the Saigon Daily News or the VSSPL. Similar to the Chiêu Hồi program, their defection would be exploited in order break down the morale of North Vietnam's soldiers.

It is questionable whether the fishermen were taken by the Paradise Island rouse, or merely played along. At least one captive fisherman claimed to have known he was not in North Vietnam upon feeling the sand on the beach of the island. And records of some fishermen being kidnapped three separate times may indicate that the fishermen were planning their own capture in order to enjoy the amenities provided by the SSPL.

SSPL developed other operations relating to Paradise Island that were rejected by policymakers. These included training visitors to assassinate North Vietnamese officials, and encouraging them to develop guerilla warfare plans upon returning to North Vietnam. Zealous SOG staff continued to raise the prospect of turning the SSPL into a counterrevolutionary force.

== The end of the SSPL ==
=== Sudden demise ===
SSPL operations significantly expanded in 1968 with the launch of the diversionary operation, Forae. Forae included many operations that linked SOG intelligence collection and subversive efforts with the myth of the SSPL, including sending pseudo-intelligence agents to North Vietnam for capture. Hanoi negotiators at the Paris Peace talks demanded that the U.S. shut down PSYOP directed at North Vietnam, including support for the SSPL. U.S. officials agreed to the policy and enforced it. SOG was informed that while the VSSPL radio could continue to operate, virtually other SSPL operations surrounding the SSPL, including Paradise Island, had to be shut down. SOG commanders were aghast at the decision. In one historian's assessment, "The announced cessation of overt U.S. operations and the sudden disappearance of SSPL craft were bound to have been noticed and linked by both the authorities and citizens of the North." The SSPL effectively ended on November 1, 1968. A possible reason for the closure was disdain for SOG by leading members of the military and government. General Westmoreland, among many others, never put much in the SOG and its covert operations. However, SOG had itself to blame for much of this; its Research and Analysis branch never conducted a PSYWAR assessment throughout the history of the Vietnam War.

=== Notional versus real resistance ===
Throughout the SSPL's history, SOG commanders proposed a number of ways of expanding the notional resistance force, many of which were turned down by policymakers. Advocates for expanding the program could point to the increasing paranoia coming out of Hanoi, North Vietnam's counterintelligence state mentality, and the creation of nineteen new capital offenses for crimes relating to SSPL operations. However, if the SSPL was to accomplish more than diverting Hanoi resources, it would have to be activated. In the eyes of one SOG historian, its merely notional existence made for "an almost crippling limitation."

Colonel Donald D. Blackburn, who became SOG chief in June 1965, designed plans to activate the notional SSPL. Doing so, thought Blackburn, would require creating a South Vietnamese support network of religious groups and labor unions in order to support the SSPL action front. The action front would be based at a real "Paradise Island" in northwestern North Vietnam. The plan was approved by the U.S. ambassador in Saigon, Henry Cabot Lodge. However, the plan was eventually turned down.

Another review SOG was commissioned by General William Westmoreland in 1967. The review was known as the Brownfield Report because it was led by Brigadier General Albert Brownfield. Released on 14 February 1968 it concluded that "the SSPL should have, for an ultimate planning goal, the overthrow of the Hanoi Regime." Neither General Westmoreland nor officials in Washington supported this conclusion.

Military leaders and Washington officials who rejected the proposal had four primary concerns:

- Doing so would violate overt U.S. policies
- It could destabilize all of North Vietnam
- North Vietnam might intensify operations against the south
- China could decide to overtly join the Vietnam War

Behind all of these objection lurked the memory of the Hungarian Revolution of 1956. Badly supervised broadcasts from the American-sponsored Radio Free Europe station probably gave the Hungarians the confidence to begin a revolution. The Hungarian revolutionaries acted under the reasonable assumption that Americans would provide military backup. Policymakers did not want to see a repeat of history. It would be reckless to encourage the SSPL recruits to begin a coup in the first place, if policymakers lacked the determination to push the Vietnam War across the DMZ.
