= Military Assistance Command, Vietnam – Studies and Observations Group =

Vietnam War–era American multi-service special operations unit

Military Assistance Command, Vietnam – Studies and Observations Group (MACV-SOG)
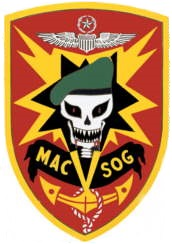
- Never assigned an official crest or patch, SOG personnel adopted this unofficial self-designed insignia
- Active: 24 January 1964 – 1 May 1972
- Country: United States
- Type: Unconventional warfare task force
- Role: Strategic reconnaissance, covert action, psychological warfare
- Size: Brigade +
- Garrison/HQ: Saigon (HQ) Detachments: Command & Control North (CCN) Quảng Trị/Phu Bai Combat Base; Command & Control Central (CCC) Kontum; Command & Control South (CCS) Ban Me Thuot
- Nicknames: SOG, MACSOG
- Engagements: Vietnam War: Gulf of Tonkin incident; Operation Steel Tiger; Operation Tiger Hound; Tet Offensive; Operation Commando Hunt; Cambodian campaign; Operation Tailwind; Operation Lam Son 719; Easter Offensive
- Decorations: Presidential Unit Citation

Military Assistance Command, Vietnam – Studies and Observations Group (MACV-SOG) was a highly classified, joint special operations unit which conducted covert unconventional warfare operations before and during the Vietnam War for the United States.

Established on 24 January 1964, it conducted strategic reconnaissance missions in South Vietnam, North Vietnam, Laos, and Cambodia. MACV-SOG's missions included taking prisoners, rescuing downed pilots or prisoners of war throughout Southeast Asia; and overseeing agent team activities and conducting psychological operations.

The unit participated in most of the significant campaigns of the Vietnam War, including the Gulf of Tonkin incident which precipitated increased American involvement, Operation Steel Tiger, Operation Tiger Hound, the Tet Offensive, Operation Commando Hunt, the Cambodian Campaign, Operation Lam Son 719, and the Easter Offensive. The unit was downsized and renamed Strategic Technical Directorate Assistance Team 158 on 1 May 1972, to support the transfer of its work to the Strategic Technical Directorate of the Army of the Republic of Vietnam as part of the Vietnamization effort.

== Foundation ==
The Studies and Observations Group (also known as SOG, MACSOG, and MACV-SOG) was a top secret, joint unconventional warfare task force created on 24 January 1964 by the Joint Chiefs of Staff as a subsidiary command of the Military Assistance Command, Vietnam (MACV). It eventually consisted primarily of personnel from the United States Army Special Forces, with attachments from the United States Navy SEALs, the United States Marine Corps Force Reconnaissance, the United States Air Force (USAF), and the Central Intelligence Agency (CIA), as well as various units from the South Vietnamese armed forces.

The Special Operations Group, as the unit was initially titled, was in fact controlled by the Special Assistant for Counterinsurgency and Special Activities (SACSA) and his staff at the Pentagon.^{a} This arrangement was necessary since SOG needed some listing in the MACV table of organization and the fact that MACV's commander, General William Westmoreland, had no authority to conduct operations outside territorial South Vietnam. This command arrangement through SACSA also allowed tight control (up to the presidential level) of the scope and scale of the organization's operations. Its mission was:

...to execute an intensified program of harassment, diversion, political pressure, the capture of prisoners, physical destruction, acquisition of intelligence, generation of propaganda, and diversion of resources, against the Democratic Republic of Vietnam.

These operations (OPLAN 34-Alpha) were conducted in an effort to convince North Vietnam to cease its sponsorship of the Viet Cong (VC) insurgency in South Vietnam. Similar operations had been under the purview of the CIA, which placed agent teams in North Vietnam through covert airdrops, reconnaissance missions, and over-the-beach insertions. Under pressure from Secretary of Defense Robert S. McNamara, the program, along with other agency paramilitary activities, was transferred to military control following the disastrous Bay of Pigs Invasion in Cuba.

Following the transition, SOG's first commander, Colonel Clyde Russell, had difficulty creating an organization to fulfill his mission since, at the time, United States Special Forces were unprepared doctrinally or organizationally to carry it out.^{b} At this point the Special Forces' mission was to conduct guerrilla operations behind enemy lines in the event of an invasion by conventional forces, not conducting agent, maritime, or psychological operations. Russell expected to take over a fully functional organization and assumed that the CIA (which would maintain a representative on SOG's staff and contribute personnel to the organization) would see the military through any teething troubles. His expectations and assumptions were incorrect. The contribution of the South Vietnamese came in the form of SOG's counterpart organization (which used a plethora of titles, and was finally called the Strategic Technical Directorate [STD]).

After a slow and shaky start, the unit got its operations underway. Originally, these consisted of a continuation of the CIA's agent infiltrations. Teams of South Vietnamese volunteers were parachuted into the North, but most were quickly captured. Maritime operations against the coast of North Vietnam resumed after the delivery of Norwegian-built "Nasty" Class Fast Patrol Boats to the unit, but these operations also fell short of expectations.

== Gulf of Tonkin Incident ==
On the night of 30–31 July 1964, four SOG vessels shelled two islands, Hon Me and Hon Ngu, off the coast of North Vietnam. It was the first time SOG vessels had attacked North Vietnamese shore facilities by shelling from the sea. The next afternoon, the destroyer USS Maddox began an electronic intelligence-gathering mission along the coast, in the Gulf of Tonkin. On the afternoon of 2 August, three P 4-class torpedo boats of the Vietnam People's Navy came out from Hon Me and attacked the Maddox. The American vessel was undamaged, and the U.S. claimed that one of the attacking vessels had been sunk and that the others were damaged by U.S. carrier-based aircraft. On the night of 3–4 August, three SOG vessels shelled targets on the mainland of North Vietnam. On the night of 4 August, after being joined by the destroyer USS Turner Joy, Maddox reported to Washington that both ships were under attack by unknown vessels, assumed to be North Vietnamese.

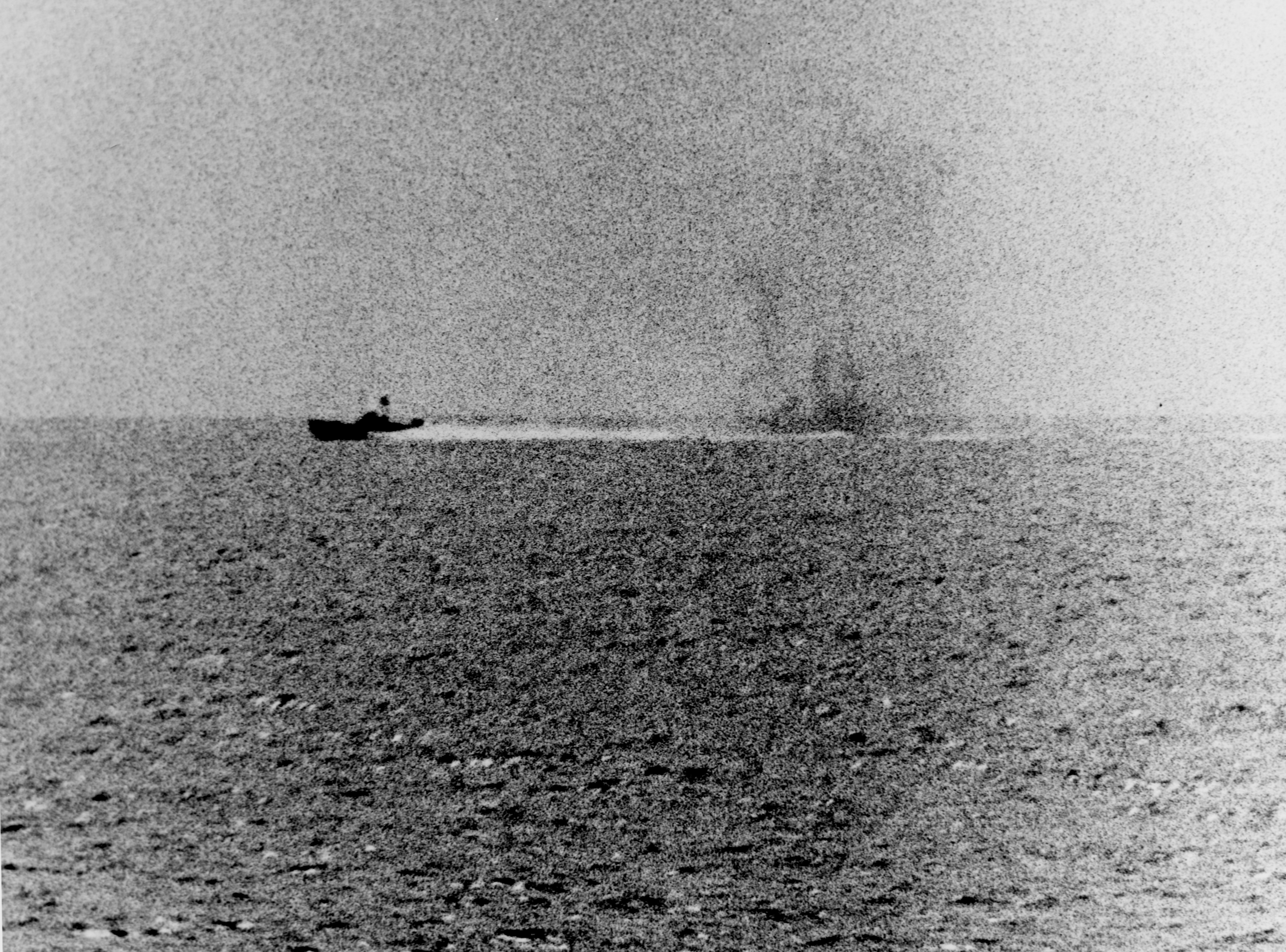
2 August 1964: A North Vietnamese P-4 under fire from Maddox.

This second reported attack led President Lyndon B. Johnson to launch Operation Pierce Arrow, an aerial attack against North Vietnamese targets on 5 August. Johnson also went to the United States Congress that day and requested the passage of the Southeast Asia Resolution (better known as the Gulf of Tonkin Resolution), asking for the unprecedented authority to conduct military actions in Southeast Asia without a declaration of war.

Johnson's announcement of the incidents involving the destroyers did not mention that SOG vessels had been conducting operations in the same area as the Maddox immediately before, and during, that cruise; nor did it mention that, on 1 and 2 August, Laotian aircraft, flown by Thai pilots, carried out bombing raids in North Vietnam itself, or that a SOG agent team had been inserted into the same relative area and been detected by the North Vietnamese. Hanoi, which may have assumed that all of these actions signaled a coordinated military escalation against them, decided to respond in what it claimed as its territorial waters.^{c} Thus, the three P-4s were ordered to attack the Maddox. The second incident, in which Maddox and Turner Joy were claimed to be attacked, never took place.

The last aspect of SOG's original missions consisted of psychological operations conducted against North Vietnam. The unit's naval arm picked up northern fishermen during searches of coastal vessels and detained them on Cu Lao Cham Island off Da Nang, South Vietnam (the fishermen were told that they were, in fact, still within their homeland). The South Vietnamese crews and personnel on the island posed as members of a fictional dissident northern communist group known as the Sacred Sword of the Patriots League (SSPL), which opposed the takeover of the Hanoi regime by politicians who supported the People's Republic of China (PRC). The kidnapped fishermen were well fed and treated, but they were also subtly interrogated and indoctrinated in the message of the SSPL. After a two-week stay, the fishermen were returned to northern waters.

This fiction was supported by the radio broadcasts of SOG's "Voice of the SSPL", leaflet drops, and gift kits containing pre-tuned radios which could only receive broadcasts from the unit's transmitters. SOG also broadcast "Radio Red Flag," programming purportedly directed by a group of dissident communist military officers also within the north. Both stations were equally adamant in their condemnations of the PRC, the South and North Vietnamese regimes, and the U.S. and called for a return to traditional Vietnamese values. Straight news, without propaganda embellishment, was broadcast from South Vietnam via the Voice of Freedom, another SOG creation.

These agent operations and propaganda efforts were supported by SOG's air arm, the First Flight Detachment. The unit consisted of four heavily modified C-123 Provider aircraft flown by Nationalist Chinese aircrews in SOG's employ. The aircraft flew agent insertions and resupply, leaflet and gift kit drops, and carried out routine logistics missions for SOG.

== Shining Brass ==
On 21 September 1965, the Pentagon authorized MACV-SOG to begin cross-border operations in Laos in areas contiguous to South Vietnam's western border. MACV had sought authority for the launching of such missions (Operation Shining Brass) since 1964 in an attempt to put boots on the ground in a reconnaissance role to observe, first hand, the enemy logistical system known as the Ho Chi Minh Trail (the Truong Son Road to the North Vietnamese). MACV, through the Seventh Air Force, had begun carrying out a strategic bombardment of the logistical system in southern Laos in April (Operation Steel Tiger) and had received authorization to launch an all-Vietnamese recon effort (Operation Leaping Lena) that had proven to be a disaster. U.S. troops were necessary and SOG was given the green light.

On 18 October 1965, MACV-SOG conducted its first cross-border mission against target D-1, a suspected truck terminus on Laotian Route 165, 15 miles (24 km) inside Laos. The team consisted of two U.S. Special Forces soldiers and four South Vietnamese. The mission was deemed a success with 88 bombing sorties flown against the terminus resulting in multiple secondary explosions, but also resulted in SOG's first casualty, Special Forces Captain Larry Thorne in a helicopter crash. William H. Sullivan, U.S. Ambassador to Laos, was determined that he would remain in control over decisions and operations that took place within the supposedly neutral kingdom.

The Laotian Civil War that raged intermittently between the communist Pathet Lao (supported by People's Army of Vietnam (PAVN) troops) and the Royal Lao armed forces (supported by the CIA-backed Hmong army of General Vang Pao and USAF aircraft) compelled both sides to maintain as low a profile as possible. Hanoi was interested in Laos due only to the necessity of keeping its supply corridor to the south open. The U.S. was involved for the opposite reason. Both routinely operated inside Laos, but both also managed to keep their operations out of sight due to Lao's supposed neutrality pursuant to the 1962 International Agreement on the Neutrality of Laos.

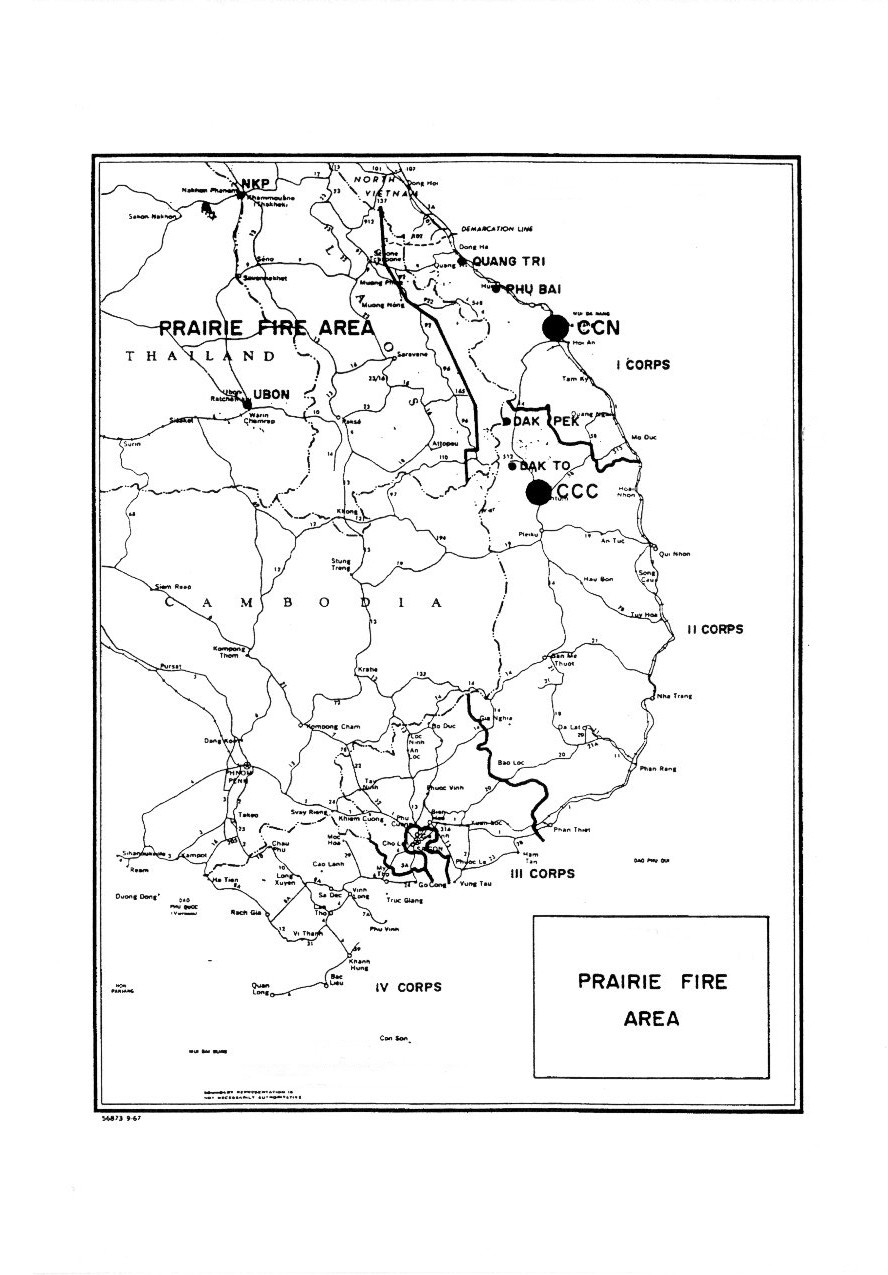
Shining Brass/Prairie Fire Area of Operations, 1969

Ambassador Sullivan had the task of juggling the bolstering of the inept Lao government and military, the CIA and its clandestine army, the USAF and its bombing campaign, and now the incursions of the U.S.-led reconnaissance teams of SOG. His limitations on SOG's operations (depth of penetration, choice of targets, length of operations) led to immediate and continuous enmity between the embassy in Vientiane and the commander and troops of SOG, who promptly labelled Sullivan the "Field Marshal."

MACV-SOG began a series of operations that would continue to grow in size and scope over the next eight years. The Laotian operations were originally run by a Command and Control (C&C) headquarters at Da Nang. The teams, usually three Americans and three to 12 indigenous mercenaries, were launched from Forward Operating Bases (FOBs) in the border areas (originally at Kham Duc, Kontum, and Khe Sanh). After in-depth planning and training, a team was airlifted over the border by aircraft provided by the U.S. Marine Corps (who operated in the I Corps area) or by dedicated Republic of Vietnam Air Force (RVNAF) H-34 Kingbee helicopters of the 219th Squadron, which would remain affiliated with MACV-SOG for its entire history. The team's mission was to penetrate the target area, gather intelligence, and remain undetected as long as possible. Communication was maintained with a forward air control (FAC) aircraft, which would communicate with USAF fighter-bombers if the necessity, or the opportunity to strike lucrative targets, arose. The FAC was also the lifeline through which the team would communicate with its FOB and through which it could call for extraction if compromised.

By the end of 1965, MACV-SOG had shaken itself out into operational groups commanded from its Saigon headquarters. These included Maritime Operations (OPS-31), which continued harassment raids and support for psychological operations (via kidnapped fishermen); Airborne Operations (OPS-34), which continued to insert agent teams and supplies into the north; Psychological Operations (OPS-33), which continued its "black" radio broadcasts, leaflet and gift kit drops, and running the operation at Cu Lao Cham; the revised Shining Brass program; and Air Operations (OPS-32), which supported the others and provided logistical airlift. Training for SOG's South Vietnamese agents, naval action teams, and indigenous mercenaries (usually Nùng or Montagnards of various tribes) was conducted at the ARVN Airborne training center (Camp Quyet Thang) at Long Thành, southeast of Bien Hoa. Training for the U.S. personnel assigned to recon teams (RTs) was conducted at Kham Duc.

== Daniel Boone ==
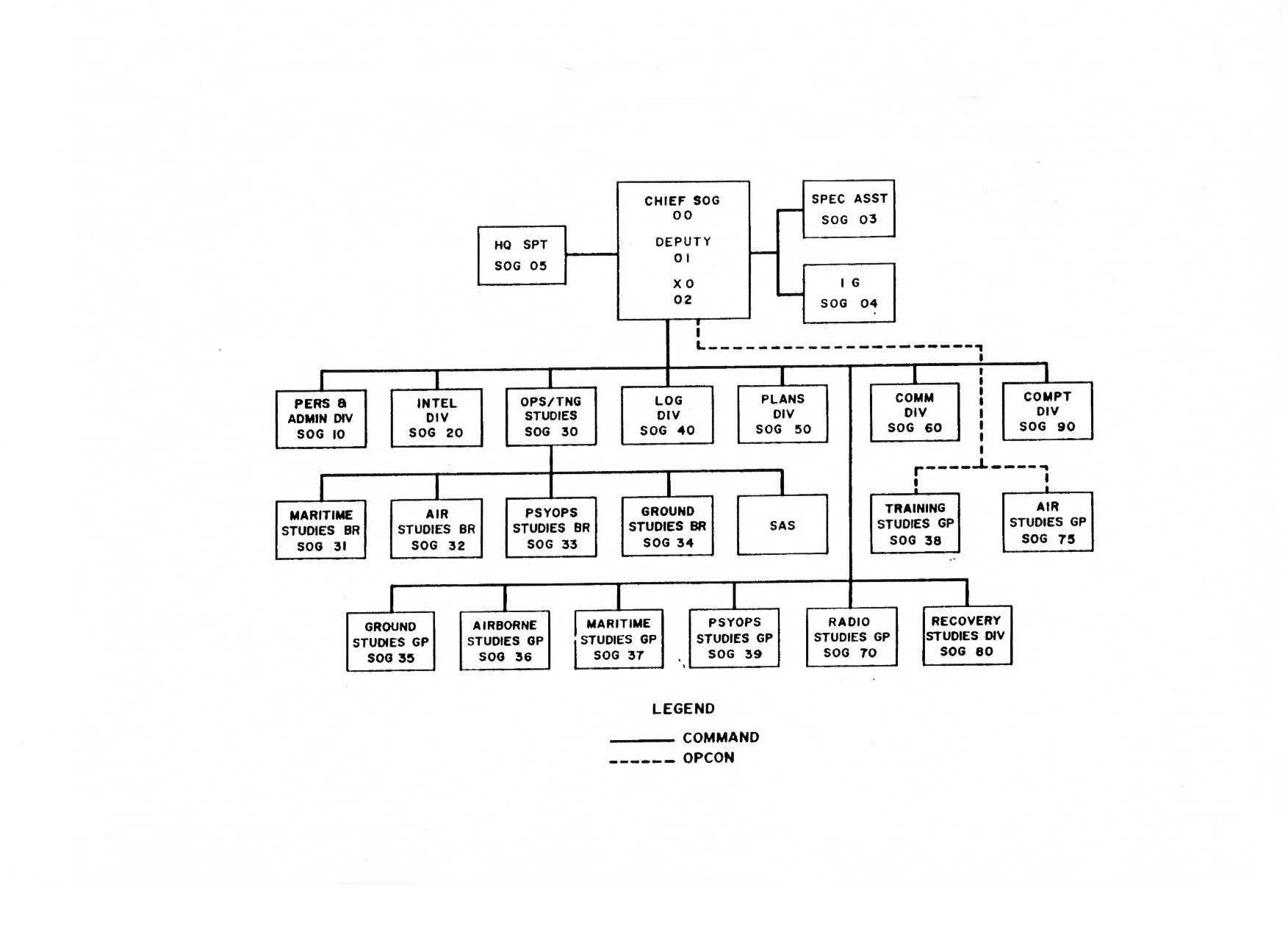
MACV–SOG Organization

During 1966 and 1967, it became obvious to MACV that the North Vietnamese were using neutral Cambodia as a part of their logistical system, funneling men and supplies to the southernmost seat of battle. Unknown was the extent of that use. The answer shocked intelligence analysts. Prince Norodom Sihanouk, trying to balance the threats facing his nation, had allowed Hanoi to set up a presence in Cambodia. Although the extension of Laotian Highway 110 into Cambodia in the tri-border region was an improvement to its logistical system, North Vietnam was now unloading communist-flagged transports in the port of Sihanoukville and trucking the cargo to its base areas on the eastern border.

Beginning in 1966, SOG conducted prisoner snatch missions of PAVN soldiers behind enemy lines along the Hồ Chí Minh Trail. No matter the team's primary mission, capturing enemy soldiers always remained the team's secondary mission when the opportunity presented itself due to valuable intelligence gained related to PAVN troop movements, size, and base locations. Teams also received rewards including free R&R trips to Taiwan or Thailand aboard a SOG C-130 Blackbird, a $100 bonus for each American, and a new Seiko watch and cash to each indigenous member. Recon teams succeeded in capturing 12 enemy soldiers in Laos during that year.

In October, 1966, efforts were made to place wiretaps in NVA base camps using specialized CIA taps with rubber coating placed over the wire to avoid detection. The first successful wiretap was conducted by RT Colorado, led by Sgt. Ted Braden, near the western end of the DMZ. During this same mission, RT Arizona was completely wiped out when they were inserted directly on top of an entrenched NVA unit. Despite this loss and others incurred as wiretapping efforts continued, the wiretaps placed by SOG members provided an invaluable intelligence source.

In April 1967, MACV-SOG was ordered to commence Operation Daniel Boone, a cross-border recon effort in Cambodia. Both SOG and the 5th Special Forces Group had been preparing for just such an eventuality. The 5th SF had gone so far as to create Projects B-56 Sigma and B-50 Omega, units based on SOG's Shining Brass organization, which had been conducting in-country recon efforts on behalf of the field forces, awaiting authorization to begin the Cambodian operations. A turf war broke out between the 5th and SOG over missions and manpower. The Joint Chiefs decided in favor of MACV-SOG, since it had already successfully conducted covert cross-border operations. Operational control of Sigma and Omega was eventually handed over to SOG.

The first mission was launched in September and construction was begun on a new C&C at Ban Me Thuot, in the Central Highlands. The recon teams (RTs) inserted into Cambodia faced even more restrictions than those in Laos. Initially, they had to cross the border on foot, had no tactical air support (neither helicopters nor fixed wing), and were not to be provided with FAC coverage. The teams were to rely on stealth and were usually smaller in size than those that operated in Laos.

Daniel Boone was not the only addition to SOG's size and missions. During 1966, the Joint Personnel Recovery Center (JPRC) was established. The JPRC was to collect and coordinate information on POWs, escapees, and evadees, to launch missions to free U.S. and allied prisoners, and to conduct post-search and rescue (SAR) operations when all other efforts had failed. SOG provided the capability to launch Brightlight rescue missions anywhere in Southeast Asia at a moments notice.^{h}

The Air Operations Group had been augmented in September 1966 by the addition of four specially-modified MC-130E Combat Talon (deployed under Combat Spear) aircraft, officially the 15th Air Commando Squadron, which supplemented the C-123s (Heavy Hook) of the First Flight Detachment already assigned to SOG. Another source of aerial support came from the CH-3 Jolly Green Giant helicopters of D-Flight, 20th Special Operations Squadron (20th SOS) (callsign Pony Express), which had arrived at Nakhon Phanom Royal Thai Navy Base during the year. These helicopters had been assigned to conduct operations in support of the CIA's clandestine operations in Laos and were a natural for assisting SOG in the Shining Brass area. When helicopter operations were finally authorized for Daniel Boone, they were provided by the dedicated support of the Huey gunships and transports of the 20th SOS (callsign Green Hornets).

MACV-SOG reconnaissance teams were also bolstered by the creation of exploitation forces, which could either support the teams in time of need, or launch their own raids against the trail. They consisted of two (later three) Haymaker battalions (which were never used) divided into company-sized "Hatchet" forces which were, in turn, sub-divided into "Hornet" platoons. The commanders and non-commissioned officers of these forces were U.S. personnel, usually assigned on a temporary duty basis in "Snakebite" teams from the 1st Special Forces Group on Okinawa.

By 1967, MACV-SOG had also been given the mission of supporting the new Muscle Shoals portion of the electronic and physical barrier system under construction along the Demilitarized Zone (DMZ) in I Corps. SOG recon teams were tasked with reconnaissance and the hand emplacement of electronic sensors both in the western DMZ (Nickel Steel) and in southeastern Laos.

Due to the disclosure of the cover name Shining Brass in a U.S. newspaper article, SOG decided that new cover designations were necessary for all of its operational elements. The Laotian cross-border effort was renamed Prairie Fire and it was combined with Daniel Boone in the newly created Ground Studies Group (OPS-35). All operations conducted against North Vietnam were now designated Footboy. These included Plowman maritime missions, Humidor psychological operations, Timberwork agent operations, and Midriff air missions.

Never happy with its long-term agent operations in North Vietnam, SOG decided to initiate a new program whose missions would be shorter in duration, conducted closer to South Vietnam, and carried out by smaller teams. Every effort would be expended to retrieve the teams when their missions were accomplished. This was the origin of STRATA, the all-Vietnamese Short Term Roadwatch and Target Acquisition teams. After a slow initial start, the first agent team was recovered from the north. The following missions were plagued with difficulties, but, after additional training, the team's performance improved dramatically.

On 2 June 1967 SOG launched an operation against Oscar Eight, a PAVN base area located approximately 11 miles (18 km) south-southwest of Khe Sanh Combat Base (16.32°N 106.678°E), believed to contain a PAVN field army headquarters. The target area was hit by nine B-52s which caused numerous secondary explosions, but an aerial observer could see PAVN troops in the area immediately afterwards. A Hatchet Force was then landed by nine H-34 Kingbees and five United States Marine Corps (USMC) CH-46s from HMM-165. The Hatchet Force was soon pinned down in the bomb craters and close air support aircraft were called in. One A-1 Skyraider was hit by flak and collided with another A-1 losing its tail and crashing into the ground killing its pilot, Lieutenant Colonel Lewis M. Robinson. The fighting continued throughout the night and the next morning it was decided to pull the force out. During the extraction two USMC UH-1E helicopter gunships from VMO-3 were shot down as was a Kingbee. A CH-46 succeeded in extracting part of the force, then a USAF F-4 Phantom was shot down. Another CH-46 came and extracted more of the force, but it was hit by antiaircraft fire and crashed from a height of 100 feet (30 m). The PAVN fired on the survivors in the wreckage killing many of them. One of the survivors, Sergeant first class Charles Wilklow was dragged into a clearing covered by PAVN machine guns to be used as bait to attract a U.S. rescue mission. After four days Wilklow escaped into the jungle, was seen by a reconnaissance plane and then rescued by a Kingbee. The raid had cost 7 U.S. dead and missing; one of the missing, USMC Corporal Frank Cius, was released on 5 March 1973 as part of Operation Homecoming. More than 40 Nùngs were also killed or missing.

== Black year – 1968 ==
For MACV and SOG, 1968 was a black year. The year saw the Tet Offensive, the largest PAVN/Viet Cong offensive thus far in the conflict, and the collapse of SOG's northern operations. Although the Tet Offensive was contained and rolled back, and significant casualties were inflicted upon the enemy, the mood of the American people and government had turned irrevocably against an open-ended commitment by the United States. For most of the year MACV-SOG's operations centered around in-country missions in support of field forces. Since the enemy had to come out from his cover and launched conventional operations, the U.S. and South Vietnam lost no opportunity in engaging them. General Westmoreland, encouraged by the Joint Chiefs of Staff, requested 200,000 more troops, under the stipulation that they would be used to conduct cross-border operations to pursue the foe. This was the logical military move at this point in the conflict, but it was already too late. In 1968, SOG recon teams conducted hundreds of missions gathering valuable intelligence but suffered 79 SF troops killed in action or missing. MACV-SOG captured three PAVN soldiers from Cambodia and one from Laos.

President Johnson sought a way out of the commitment that he had originally escalated. Politically, this was late in coming, but Washington had finally awakened to its predicament. Johnson attempted to get Hanoi to reopen peace negotiations and the carrot he offered was the cessation of all U.S. operations against North Vietnam north of the 20th parallel. Hanoi had only sought an end to the air campaign against the north (Operation Rolling Thunder), but Johnson went one further by calling a halt to all northern operations, both overt and covert. This order effectively ended MACV-SOG's agent team, propaganda, and aerial operations.

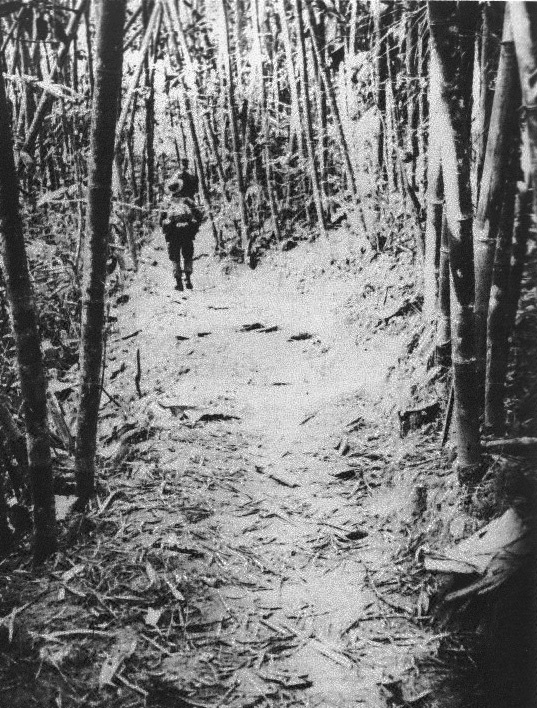
North Vietnamese troops on the Ho Chi Minh trail in Laos, photographed by a hidden SOG recon team.

In reality, for MACV-SOG, the point was moot. Suspicions abounded within the organization that Operation Timberwork had been penetrated by North Vietnamese dich van agents. Intelligence returns from the northern agent teams had been disappointing and more than three-quarters of the agents inserted had been captured either during or not long after their insertion. The fact that SOG had followed the CIA's failed formula for three years was not considered a contributing factor. The unit was more concerned over Washington's continuous rejection of one of the original goals of the operation: the formation of a resistance movement by potential dissident elements in North Vietnam. Washington's stated goal in the conflict was a free and viable South Vietnam, not the overthrow of the Hanoi regime. The conundrum was what would happen had the program succeeded. The best possible outcome would have been a repeat of the ill-fated Hungarian revolution of 1956, crushed by the Soviet Union, and about which the U.S. could do nothing.

Some American writers on the subject (including many ex-SOG personnel) blamed the failure of the operations on the penetration of the unit by enemy spies – a claim not entirely unsupported by facts. Others, however, laid more of the blame on the operational ineptitude of SOG, which simply continued to repeat a failed formula. Changes to the infiltration program (in the form of the diversionary Operation Forae), spurred by suspicions at headquarters, came only in 1967.

The security apparatus of North Vietnam had decades in which to learn to cope with not only the CIA's program, but with the unconventional and covert operations of its French predecessors. The CIA had been loath to conduct such operations in the north, since similar operations in the Soviet Union, Eastern Europe, and the PRC had been abject failures and North Vietnam was considered an even tougher target to penetrate.

North Vietnamese security forces simply captured a team, turned its radio operator, and continued to broadcast as though nothing had happened. Supplies and reinforcements were requested, parachuted in to the requesting team's location, and were likewise captured. During the period 1960–1968 both the CIA and MACV-SOG dispatched 456 South Vietnamese agents to their deaths or long incarcerations in northern prisons. Hanoi continued this process year after year, learning SOG's operational methods and bending them to its purpose. In the end, it was running one of the most successful counterintelligence operations of the post-Second World War period.

On the night of 22–23 August as part of the Phase III Offensive a company from the VC R20 Battalion and a sapper platoon infiltrated MACV-SOG's Forward Operating Base 4, a compound just south of Marble Mountain Air Facility, killing 17 Special Forces soldiers (their largest one-day loss of the war) and wounding another 125 Allied troops. Thirty-two VC were killed.

== Commando Hunt ==
With the deflation of its northern operations (although the JCS demanded that SOG retain the capability of reinitiating them), SOG concentrated its efforts on supporting Commando Hunt, the Seventh/Thirteenth Air Force's anti-infiltration campaign in Laos. By 1969 the Ground Studies Group was running its operations from C&Cs at Da Nang for operations in southeastern Laos and at Ban Me Thuot for its Cambodian operations. That year they were joined by a new C&C at Kontum, for operations launched into the triborder region of the Prairie Fire and the northern area of Daniel Boone, which was renamed Salem House that year. Each of the C&Cs was now fielding battalion-size forces, and the number of missions rose proportionately.

Command and Control North (CCN) at Da Nang, commanded by a lieutenant colonel, used 60 recon teams and two exploitation battalions (four companies of three platoons). Command and Control Central (CCC) at Kontum, also commanded by a lieutenant colonel, used 30 teams and one exploitation battalion. During 1969 404 recon missions and 48 exploitation force operations were conducted in Laos. To give an example of the cost of such operations, during the year 20 Americans were killed, 199 wounded, and nine went missing in the Prairie Fire area. Casualties among the Special Commando Units (SCUs – pronounced Sues), as the indigenous mercenaries were titled, were: 57 killed, 270 wounded, and 31 missing. Command and Control South (CCS) at Ban Me Thuot, also commanded by a lieutenant colonel, consisted of 30 teams and an exploitation battalion. Since the use of exploitation forces was forbidden in Cambodia, these troops were utilized in securing launch sites, providing installation security, and conducting in-country missions. During the year, 454 reconnaissance operations were conducted in Cambodia.

The teams were ferried into action by RVNAF H-34 Kingbees and assorted U.S. Army aviation units in the Prairie Fire area, and by the USAF helicopters of the 20th SOS in the Salem House area. By the end of 1969, SOG was authorized 394 U.S. personnel, but it is useful to compare those numbers to the actual strengths of the operational elements. There were 1,041 Army, 476 USAF, 17 USMC and seven CIA personnel assigned to those units. They were supported by 3,068 SCUs, and 5,402 South Vietnamese and third-country civilian employees, leading to a total of 10,210 military personnel and civilians either assigned to or working for MACV-SOG.

The mission of the Ground Studies Group was to support the sensor-driven Operation Commando Hunt, which saw the rapid expansion of the bombing of the Ho Chi Minh Trail. This was made possible by the close-out of Rolling Thunder, which freed up hundreds of aircraft for interdiction missions. Intelligence for the campaign was supplied by both the recon teams of MACV-SOG and by the strings of air-dropped electronic sensors of Operation Igloo White (the successor to Muscle Shoals), controlled from Nakhon Phanom. 1969 saw the apogee of the bombing campaign, when 433,000 tons of bombs were dropped on Laos. SOG supported the effort with ground reconnaissance, sensor emplacement, wiretap, and bomb damage assessment missions. The cessation of the bombing of the north also freed the North Vietnamese to reinforce their anti-aircraft defenses of the trail system and aircraft losses rose proportionately.

By 1969, the North Vietnamese had also worked out their doctrine and techniques for dealing with the recon teams. Originally, the PAVN had been caught unprepared and had been forced to respond in whatever haphazard manner local commanders could organize. Soon, however, an early warning system was created by placing radio-equipped air watch units within the flight paths between the launch sites and Base Areas. Within the Base Areas, lookouts were placed in trees and platforms to watch likely landing zones while the roads and trails were routinely swept by security forces. The PAVN also began to organize and develop specialized units that would both drive and then fix the teams so that they could be destroyed. By 1970, they had created a layered and effective system, and SOG recon teams found their time on the ground both shortened and more dangerous. The mauling or wiping out of entire teams began to become a more common occurrence.

== Laos and Cambodia ==
Since his election in 1968, President Richard M. Nixon had been seeking a negotiated settlement to the Vietnam War. In 1970, he saw an opportunity to buy time for the Saigon government during Vietnamization, the phased withdrawal of U.S. troops that began in the previous year. He also sought to convince Hanoi that he meant business. That opportunity was provided by the overthrow of Cambodia's Prince Sihanouk by the pro-American General Lon Nol.

Nixon had escalated U.S. involvement in Cambodia by authorizing the secret Operation Menu bombings and by the time of Sihanouk's ouster, the program had been in operation for 14 months. Lon Nol promptly ordered North Vietnamese personnel out of the country. North Vietnam responded with an invasion of the country launched at the explicit request of the Khmer Rouge following negotiations with Nuon Chea. Nixon then authorized a series of incursions by U.S. and South Vietnamese ground forces that began on 30 April. With intelligence on communist Base Areas in eastern Cambodia gleaned from MACV-SOG, huge stockpiles of PAVN arms, ammunition, and supplies were overrun and captured. In May, Operation Freedom Deal, a continuous aerial campaign against the PAVN/Viet Cong and the Khmer Rouge was initiated. SOG recon teams in Cambodia now had all the air support that they needed.

As a result of U.S. political reaction, on 29 December the Cooper-Church Amendment was passed by Congress, prohibiting participation by U.S. ground forces in any future operations in either Cambodia or Laos. U.S. participation in Cambodian operations (which were already being turned over to all-Vietnamese teams) ended on 1 July 1970 and the same stipulation was to apply in Laos no later than 8 February 1971 (the only qualifications to the restrictions, in both operational areas, were in case of either POW rescue missions or aircraft crash site inspections). Although unknown to the U.S. public, many MACV-SOG veterans participated in Operation Ivory Coast, the Son Tay POW camp raid carried out in North Vietnam on 21 November 1970. The deputy commander of the joint rescue force was Colonel Arthur "Bull" Simons, who had created SOG's cross-border effort in 1965.

By 1971 the U.S. was steadily withdrawing from Southeast Asia. As a test of Vietnamization, Washington decided to allow the South Vietnamese to launch Operation Lam Son 719, the long-sought incursion into Laos whose aim would be the cutting the Ho Chi Minh Trail. MACV and the South Vietnamese had been planning just such an operation as far back as August 1964, but the concept was continuously turned down due to the fallout that would have been incurred by the invasion of supposedly "neutral" Laos. The Laotian government (supported by Ambassador Sullivan and the State Department) was adamantly opposed to such an operation. On 8 February, 16,000 (later 20,000) South Vietnamese troops, backed by U.S. helicopter and air support, rolled into Laos along Route 9 and headed for the PAVN logistical hub at Tchepone. Unlike the Cambodian incursion, however, the North Vietnamese stood and fought, gradually mustering 60,000 troops. By 25 March, the South Vietnamese forces retreated. Ironically, MACV-SOG's role in the operation was only peripheral. Recon teams conducted diversionary operations prior to the invasion and helped cover the South Vietnamese withdrawal, but they were otherwise forbidden from participation in the very operation that both MACV-SOG and MACV had come to consider its raison d'etre.

In Laos, the North Vietnamese cleared their logistical corridor to the west for security reasons and increased their aid and support for the Pathet Lao. Fighting that once was seasonal became continuous and conventional. The Cambodian Civil War would escalate with the PRC-backed Khmer Rouge fighting Lon Nol's central government. Following US withdrawal from Indochina, its allies in Laos and Cambodia would collapse to the North Vietnamese backed forces.

== Withdrawal ==
The American withdrawal from South Vietnam began to directly affect SOG in 1971. By early 1972 U.S. military personnel were forbidden from conducting operations in either Laos or Cambodia, its teams of mercenary SCUs continued those operations (in the newly renamed Phu Dung/Prairie Fire and Thot Not/Salem House areas). The organization did, however, maintain its strength in U.S. personnel, who continued to conduct in-country missions. It was also continuously tasked by the JCS with maintaining forces in readiness to once again take up northern operations if called upon to do so.

The Easter Offensive, launched by the PAVN on 30 March 1972, made cross-border operations irrelevant. As with Tet, all of MACV-SOG/STD's efforts were concentrated on in-country missions.

In late March 1971, when the 5th Special Force Group was redeployed to the U.S., the Command and Control elements were renamed Task Force Advisory Elements (TF1AE, TF2AE and TF3AE). They originally consisted of 244 U.S. and 780 indigenous personnel each, but they were quickly drawn down by the elimination of the exploitation forces. For SOG, Vietnamization was finally nigh. On 1 May 1972, the unit was reduced in strength and renamed the Strategic Technical Directorate Assistance Team 158 (STDAT-158). The Ground Studies Group was disestablished and replaced by the Liaison Service Advisory Detachments. SOG's air elements stood down for redeployment, the JPRC was turned over to MACV and redesignated the Joint Casualty Resolution Center, while the psychological operations personnel and installations were turned over to either the STD or JUSPAO. The final casualty of SOG ground operations occurred on 11 October 1971 when Sergeant First Class Audley D. Mills was killed when a booby-trap he was trying to disarm detonated.

The function of STDAT-158 was to assist the STD in a complete takeover of SOG's operations. The operational elements had already been absorbed and were expanded by the inclusion of troops from the now-disbanded South Vietnamese Special Forces. The task of the American personnel was to provide technical support (in logistics, communications, etc.) and advice to the STD. This the unit did until its disbandment on 12 March 1973. The South Vietnamese Joint General Staff, strapped for cash and equipment in the final stand-down period, never used the STD in a strategic reconnaissance role. Instead, the STD's units were launched on in-country missions until the dissolution of their parent organization in March 1973.

On 27 January 1973, the belligerent powers signed the Paris Peace Accords, and all U.S. combat operations in South Vietnam were halted on 28 January. On 21 February, a similar accord was signed on Laos, ending the bombing of that country and instituting a cease fire. On the 29th, MACV was disestablished and remaining U.S. troops began leaving the south. On 14 August the U.S. Air Force ceased its bombing of Cambodia, bringing all military actions by the U.S. in Southeast Asia to an end.

== Recognition ==
The U.S. military (and MACV-SOG personnel) kept tight security over knowledge of the unit's operations and existence until the early 1980s. Although there had been some small leaks by the media during the conflict, they were usually erroneous and easily dismissed. More specific was the release of documents dealing with the early days of the operation in the Pentagon Papers and by the testimony of ex-SOG personnel during congressional investigations into the bombing campaigns in Laos and Cambodia in the early 1970s. Historians interested in the unit's activities had to wait until the early 1990s, when MACV-SOG's Annexes to the annual MACV Command Histories and a Pentagon documentation study of the organization were declassified for the Senate Select Committee on POW/MIA Affairs' hearings on the Vietnam War POW/MIA issue.

One early source of information (if one read between the lines) were the citations issued for the award of the Medal of Honor to MACV-SOG personnel (although they were never recognized as such). One USAF helicopter pilot, two U.S. Navy SEALs, one U.S. Army medic, and nine Green Berets earned the nation's highest award on SOG operations:

- Staff Sergeant Roy P. Benavidez (who had to wait until he received his award from President Ronald Reagan)
- Staff Sergeant Jon Cavaiani
- First Lieutenant James P. Fleming (USAF 20th Special Operations Squadron)
- First Lieutenant Loren D. Hagen (posthumous), CCN/TF1AE
- Sergeant First Class Robert L. Howard (awarded on his third separate recommendation)
- Specialist 5 John J. Kedenburg (posthumous)
- Staff Sergeant Franklin D. Miller (5th Special Forces Group)
- Lieutenant Thomas R. Norris (Navy SEAL)
- Sergeant Gary M. Rose
- First Lieutenant George K. Sisler (posthumous)
- Engineman Second Class Michael E. Thornton (Navy SEAL), STDAT-158
- Sergeant First Class Fred W. Zabitosky

Twenty-two other members of the unit received the Distinguished Service Cross, the nation's second highest award for valor. On 4 April 2001, the U.S. Army officially recognized the bravery, integrity, and devotion to duty of its covert warriors by awarding the unit a Presidential Unit Citation during a ceremony at Fort Bragg, North Carolina, the home of U.S. Army Special Forces.

== Technology ==
- McGuire rig
- Fulton surface-to-air recovery system

== In popular culture ==
- In Francis Ford Coppola's film Apocalypse Now, Captain Willard is assigned to SOG and then sent after Colonel Kurtz, who has taken his Montagnard force into Cambodia.
- The Studies and Observations Group makes an appearance in the 2010 Activision first-person shooter video game Call of Duty: Black Ops, being an element in the story line as well as a playable multiplayer faction. MACV-SOG also appears in the sequel Call of Duty: Black Ops Cold War in the single-player story campaign.
- On the TV series Tour of Duty, the third season sees the main characters reassigned to SOG in order to conduct covert operations in Vietnam and in Cambodia.
- In the tabletop role-playing game Fall of DELTA GREEN, the eponymous organization employs Studies and Observations Group operatives and assets for their own operations. The game also suggests that MACV-SOG might have been inspired by DELTA GREEN, as both organizations have similar principles: combining operatives from various military and civilian agencies for covert operations, Top Secret classification and plausible deniability.
- The Studies and Observations Group is the namesake and primary focus of the DLC SOG: Prairie Fire made for the military simulator video game Arma 3. SOG: Prairie Fire was released in 2021 and had direct advisement from MACV-SOG veterans.

== See also ==
- Case–Church Amendment
- Central Intelligence Agency's Special Activities Center
- CIA activities in Cambodia
- CIA activities in Laos
- Hughes–Ryan Amendment
- North Vietnamese invasion of Laos

== Footnotes ==
=== Explanatory footnotes ===
1. ^a These officers included Major Generals Victor H. Krulak, USMC (1962–1964), Rollen H. Anthis, USAF (1964–1966), William R. Peers, USA (1966–1967), William E. DePuy, USA (1967–1969), John F. Freund, USA (1969–1970), and Brigadier Generals Donald Blackburn, USA (1970–1971) and Leroy J. Manor, USAF (1971–1973).
2. ^b The commanders of SOG were Colonels Clyde Russell (1964–1965), Donald Blackburn (1965–1966), John Singlaub (1966–1968), Stephen Cavanaugh (1968–1970) and John Sadler (1970–1972), all of whom were U.S. Army Special Forces officers.
3. ^c The North Vietnamese claimed a 12-mile reach for its territorial waters. Maddox was instructed not to approach closer than eight miles from the coast and four miles from offshore islands. It is instructive that similar patrols off the coast of the PRC were not allowed to approach within 15 miles of the coast or 12 miles from offshore islands.
4. ^d A thorough description of the history of the JPRC is found in George Veith's Code-Name BRIGHTLIGHT.

=== Reference notes ===
1. ^A Dr. Moïse's account should be compared to the official Navy version, which was essentially the one given to Congress. See Edward Marolda and Oscar Fitzgerald, The United States Navy and the Vietnam Conflict, Vol. 2: From Military Assistance to Combat, 1959–1965. Washington DC: U.S. Naval Historical Center, 1986
2. ^B See also interview of John Singlaub by Richard Shultz in the CD-ROM Military Assistance Command, Vietnam Studies and Observations Group compiled by Steve Sherman, Houston, TX: Radix Press, 2002, pp. 16–19, 50–51.

== General and cited sources ==
Unpublished government documents

- Joint Chiefs of Staff (1970). Military Assistance Command Studies and Observations Group, Documentation Study (July 1970).
- US Military Assistance Command, Vietnam, Strategic Technical Directorate Assistance Team 158 (1973). Command History 1 May 1972 – March 1973. Saigon: STDAT-158.
- US Military Assistance Command, Vietnam Studies and Observations Group (1965). Annex A, Command History 1964. Saigon: MACVSOG.
- —— (1966). Annex N, Command History 1965. Saigon: MACVSOG.
- —— (1967). Annex M, Command History 1966. Saigon: MACVSOG.
- —— (1968). Annex G, Command History 1967. Saigon: MACVSOG.
- —— (1969). Annex F, Command History 1968. Saigon: MACVSOG.
- —— (1970). Annex F, Command History 1969. Saigon: MACVSOG.
- —— (1971). Annex B, Command History 1970. Saigon: MACVSOG.
- —— (1972). Annex B, Command History 1971–72. Saigon: MACVSOG.

Published government documents

- Military History Institute of Vietnam (2002). Victory in Vietnam: The Official History of the People's Army of Vietnam, 1954–1975. Translated by Pribbenow, Merle L. Lawrence, Kansas: University of Kansas Press. ISBN 978-0-7006-1175-1.
- Nalty, Bernard C. (2005). The War Against Trucks: Aerial Interdiction in Southern Laos, 1968–1972. Washington DC: Air Force History and Museums Program.
- U.S. House of Representatives (1972). United States-Vietnam Relations 1945–1967: A Study Prepared for the Department of Defense. Records of the House Committee on Armed Services. Washington DC: US Government Printing Office.
- U.S. Senate, 91st Congress, First Session (1970). Hearings before the Committee on United States Security Agreements and Commitments Abroad of the Committee on Foreign Relations, United States Security Agreements and Commitments Abroad, Kingdom of Laos. Washington, DC: U.S. Government Printing Office.
- U.S. Senate, 93rd Congress, First Session (1973). Hearings before the Senate Armed Services Committee. Bombing in Cambodia. Washington, DC: U.S. Government Printing Office.
- U.S. Senate, Committee on Veteran's Affairs (February 1979). Medal of Honor Recipients, 1863–1978. Washington, DC: U.S. Government Printing Office.
- Van Staaveren, Jacob (1993). Interdiction in Southern Laos, 1964–1968. Washington DC: Center for Air Force History.

Memoirs and autobiographies

- Colby, William (1978). Honorable Men: My Life in the CIA. New York: Simon & Schuster. ISBN 0-671-22875-7.
- Parnar, Joe; Dumont, Robert (2007). SOG Medic: Stories from Vietnam and Over the Fence. Boulder, Colorado: Paladin Press. ISBN 9781581606263. OCLC 239277869.
- Plaster, John L. (2004). Secret Commandos: Behind Enemy Lines with the Elite Warriors of SOG. New York: Simon and Schuster. ISBN 0684856735. OCLC 54537114.
- Singlaub, John K.; McConnell, Malcolm (1991). Hazardous Duty: An American Soldier in the Twentieth Century. New York: Summit Books. ISBN 0671705164. OCLC 23583308.

Secondary sources

- Andrade, Dale (1995). Trial By Fire: the 1972 Easter offensive, America's last Vietnam battle. New York: Hippocrene Books. ISBN 0781802865. OCLC 30778306.
- Conboy, Kenneth; Andrade, Dale (2000). Spies and Commandos: how America lost the secret war in North Vietnam. Lawrence, Kansas: University of Kansas Press. ISBN 0700611479. OCLC 42061137.
- Conboy, Kenneth; Morrison, James (1995). Shadow War: The CIA's Secret War in Laos. Boulder, Colorado: Paladin Press. ISBN 0873648250. OCLC 32753940.
- Dougan, Clark; Weiss, Stephen (1983). Nineteen Sixty-Eight. Boston: Boston Publishing Company. ISBN 0939526069. OCLC 9905799.
- Greco, Frank (2004). Running Recon: A Photo Journey with SOG Special Ops Along the Ho Chi Minh Trail. Boulder, Colorado: Paladin Press. ISBN 1581604262. OCLC 56793871.
- Isaacs, Arnold R.; Hardy, Gordon; Brown, McAlister (1987). Pawns of War. Boston: Boston Publishing Company. ISBN 0939526247. OCLC 17278419.
- Karnow, Stanley (1983). Vietnam, A History. New York: Viking Press. ISBN 0140145338. OCLC 236058254.
- Maitland, Terrence; McInerney, Peter (1983). A Contagion of War. Boston: Boston Publishing Company. ISBN 0939526050. OCLC 10103256.
- McNamara, Robert S.; VanDeMark, Brian (1995). In Retrospect. New York: New York Times Books. ISBN 0812925238. OCLC 31375622.
- Moïse, Edwin (1996). Tonkin Gulf and the Escalation of the Vietnam War. Chapel Hill: University of North Carolina Press. ISBN 0-8078-2300-7. OCLC 34477141.
- Nolan, Keith W. (1986). Into Laos. Novato, CA: Presidio. ISBN 0891412476. OCLC 13581560.
- Plaster, John L. (1997). SOG : The Secret Wars of America's Commandos in Vietnam. New York, New York: Simon & Schuster. ISBN 9780684811055. OCLC 777435955.
- Plaster, John L. (2000). SOG: A Photo History of the Secret Wars. Boulder, Colorado: Paladin Press. ISBN 1-58160-597-8. OCLC 44584774.
- Prados, John (1998). The Blood Road: The Ho Chi Minh Trail and the Vietnam War. New York: John Wiley and Sons. ISBN 0471254657. OCLC 59490721.
- Saal, Harve (1990). SOG – MACV Studies and Observations Group (Behind Enemy Lines) (Four vols. Vol I. Historical Evolution; Vol. II Locations; Vol. III Legends; Vol. IV Appendices.). Ann Arbour, Michigan: Edwards Brothers.
- Schemmer, Benjamin (1976). The Raid. Harper & Row. ISBN 0060138025. OCLC 2330976.
- Shaw, John (2005). The Cambodian Campaign: The 1970 Offensive and America's Vietnam War. Lawrence, Kansas: University of Kansas Press. ISBN 0700614052. OCLC 59098863.
- Shawcross, William (1979). Sideshow: Kissinger, Nixon, and the Destruction of Cambodia. New York: Washington Square Press. ISBN 0671230700. OCLC 4569931.
- Shultz, Richard H. (1999). The Secret War Against Hanoi: Kennedy's and Johnson's use of spies, saboteurs, and covert warriors in North Vietnam. New York: Harper Collins. ISBN 0-06-019454-5. OCLC 42061189.
- Tourison, Sedgwick (1995). Secret Army, Secret War: Washington's Tragic Spy Operation in North Vietnam. Annapolis Maryland: Naval Institute Press. ISBN 1557508186. OCLC 32469154.
- Veith, George J. (1998). Code-Name BRIGHTLIGHT. New York: Dell.
- Warner, Roger (1996). Shooting at the Moon: The Story of America's Clandestine War in Laos. South Royalton VT: Steerforth Press. ISBN 1883642361. OCLC 42881425.
