= Operation Niagara =

Part of the Vietnam War (1968)

- Part of the Vietnam War
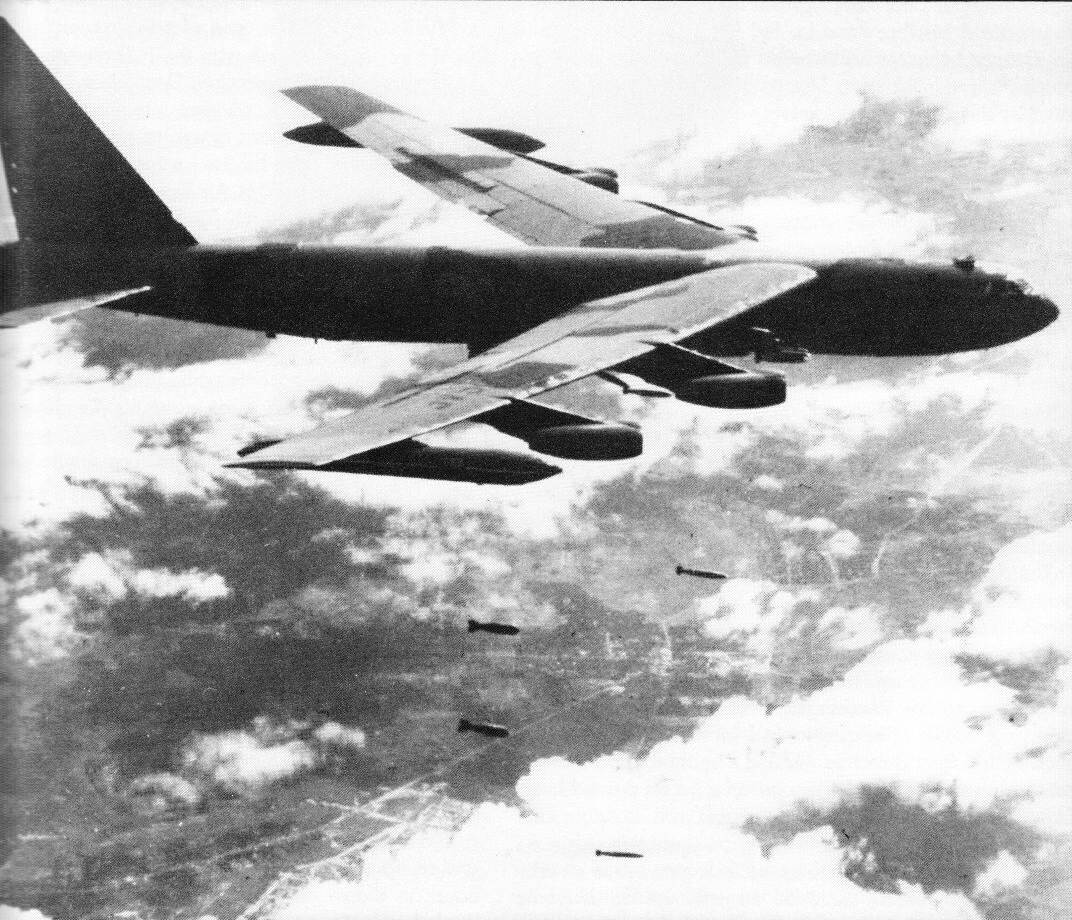
- B-52 during Operation Arc Light
| Date | January–March 1968 |
| Location | Khe Sanh Combat Base, Quang Tri Province, Republic of Vietnam |
| Result | U.S estimate: 9,800–13,000 PAVN killed |

Belligerents
| United States; Australia | North Vietnam |

Operation Niagara was a U.S. Seventh Air Force close air support campaign carried out from January through March 1968, during the Vietnam War. Its purpose was to serve as an aerial umbrella for the defense of the U.S. Marine Corps Khe Sanh Combat Base on the Khe Sanh Plateau, in western Quang Tri Province of the Republic of Vietnam. The base was under siege by an estimated three-divisional force of the People's Army of Vietnam (PAVN).

== Niagara I ==
During the last four months of 1967 a series of fierce border battles erupted in South Vietnam that cast a shadow on what had been a positive year for U.S. forces in Southeast Asia. Beginning in mid-September, PAVN began the continuous shelling of a Marine outpost located at Con Thien, near the Demilitarized Zone in northern Quang Tri Province. After an aerial onslaught dubbed Operation Neutralize, PAVN pressure abated at the end of October. At the beginning of November, PAVN was discovered operating in force near the Special Forces outpost at Dak To, in the Central Highlands. After one month of intense fighting, the PAVN forces had faded back across the border.

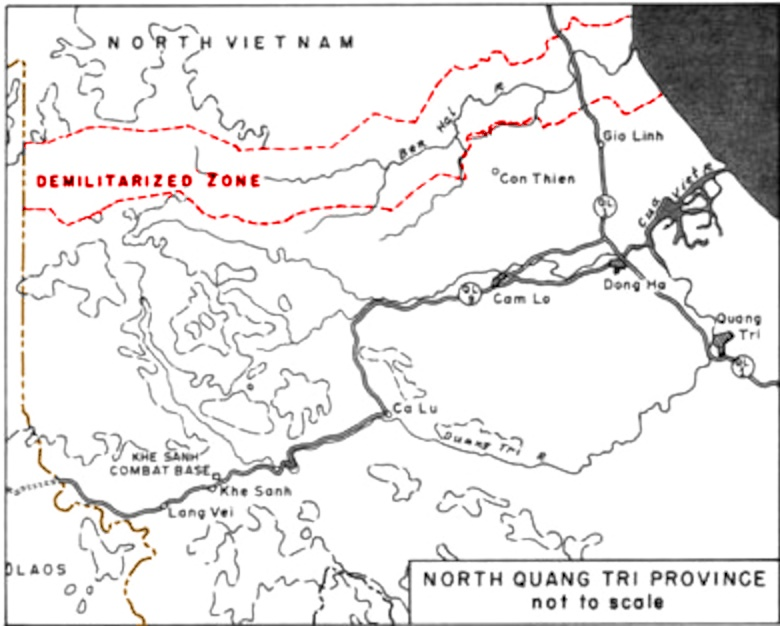
Quang Tri Province and the DMZ.

In January 1968, the recently installed electronic sensors of Operation Igloo White, which were undergoing their test and evaluation phase in southeastern Laos, were alerted to a flurry of PAVN activity along the Ho Chi Minh Trail in Laos opposite the northwestern corner of South Vietnam. It was due to the extensive nature of these activities that Operation Niagara I – an intelligence collection effort by CIA roadwatch teams, the recon teams of the highly secret Military Assistance Command, Vietnam Studies and Observations Group, and aerial photo reconnaissance aircraft, was launched. Intelligence confirmed that PAVN forces were indeed in the process of building up for an offensive, but the target of any planned offensive was unknown. Later in the month Marine patrols from the Khe Sanh Combat Base tripped off a series of actions that confirmed that three PAVN divisions: the 304th, 320th, 325C and a regiment of the 324th were already near, or advancing toward, Khe Sanh.

It was at this point that the U.S. commander in Vietnam, General William C. Westmoreland, decided to reinforce the Marine position (Khe Sanh was a key border surveillance outpost and was also considered a prime jump-off point for any future incursion into Laos. This was a risky proposition, considering that the North Vietnamese were expected to isolate the base by cutting off Route 9, the only roadway into the area. Aerial resupply would have to make up the difference, but the ongoing northwest monsoon, which was bound to shroud the area in rain, mist, and fog, would make this attempt problematic. Westmoreland was undaunted. He believed that American air power would prevent a repeat of the French defeat at the Battle of Dien Bien Phu, which rapidly became the point of comparison, both among military officers and the media.

== Inter-service rivalry ==
Westmoreland and his deputy commander for air operations, General William W. Momyer (who was also commander of the Seventh Air Force) had been awaiting exactly such an opportunity. PAVN forces would be massing in a single geographic area in divisional strength in a remote unpopulated region where there would be no restrictions on bombing missions. Westmoreland gave Momyer the responsibility of coordinating all air assets during the operation to support Khe Sanh. This caused problems for the Marines, however, who possessed their own aviation squadrons and operated under their own close air support doctrine. They were reluctant to relinquish authority to an Air Force general.

General Westmoreland commanded forces only in geographical South Vietnam and in its air space (through the Seventh Air Force). The bombing campaign against North Vietnam was controlled by CINCPAC in Honolulu, while responsibility for the aerial interdiction campaigns in Laos were split between the Seventh and Seventh/Thirteenth Air Forces. This arrangement went against the grain of Air Force doctrine, which was predicated on the single air manager concept. One headquarters would allocate and coordinate air assets, distributing them wherever they were considered most necessary, and then transfer them as the situation changed. The Marines, whose aircraft and doctrine were integral to their operations, were under no such centralized control.

On January 19, Westmoreland passed his request for Air Force control up to the chain of command to CINCPAC, Admiral U.S. Grant Sharp, Jr., in Honolulu. Meanwhile, heated debate ensued among Westmoreland, the Joint Chiefs of Staff, and Marine Corps Commandant Leonard F. Chapman Jr., Army Chief of Staff Harold K. Johnson backed the Marine position due to his concern over protecting the Army's air assets from Air Force co-option. The perennial interservice rivalry over missions and assets (which had plagued the services since the creation of the National Security Act of 1947) raged anew. Westmoreland went so far as to threaten to resign if his wishes were not obeyed. As a result, for the first time during the Vietnam War, air operations were placed, if only temporarily, under the control of a single manager.

== Niagara II ==
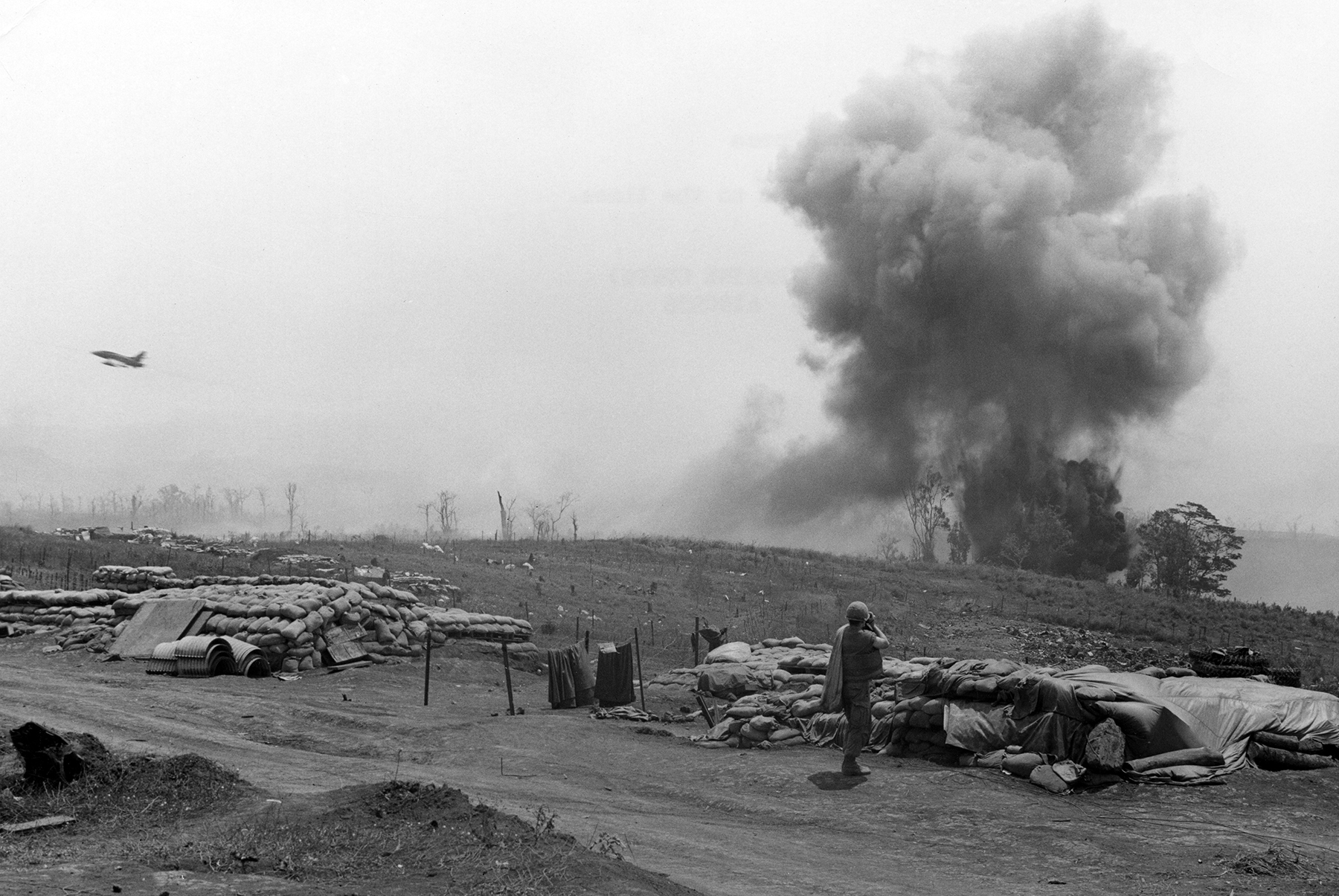
F-100 drops bombs near Khe Sanh perimeter

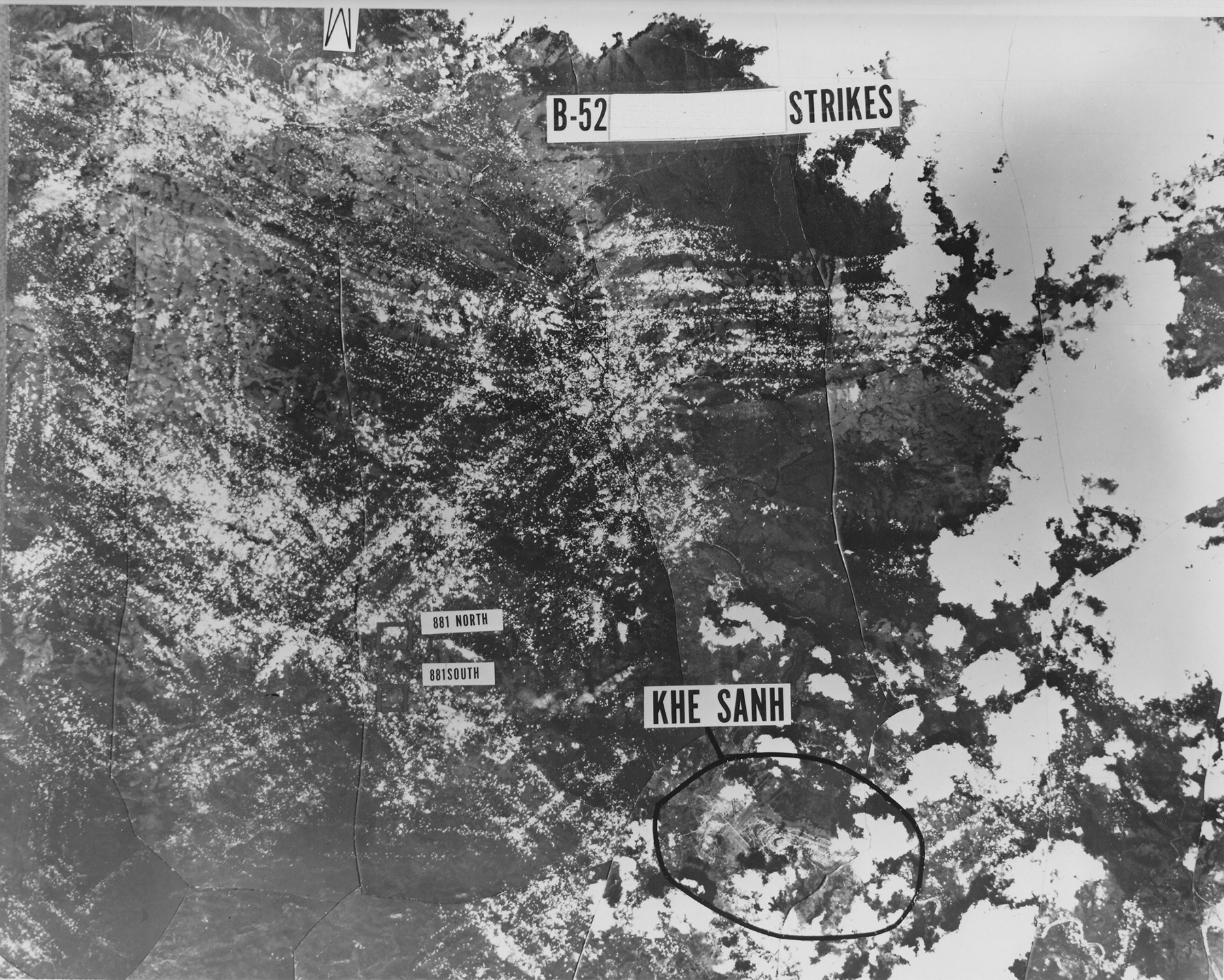
Photo-reconnaissance montage showing effect of B-52 strikes

On 21 January the PAVN opened a continuous artillery barrage directed at Khe Sanh. It was also the launch day for Operation Niagara II. The Marine Direct Air Support Center (DASC), located at the Combat Base, was responsible for the coordination of air strikes with artillery fire. An airborne battlefield command and control center (ABCCC), in the form of a C-130 Hercules, directed strike aircraft to targets called in by ground troops and marked by forward air control (FAC) aircraft. When weather conditions prevented FAC-directed strikes, the strike bombers were directed to their targets by either a Marine TPQ-10 radar installation located at the combat base or by Air Force Combat Skyspot MSQ-77 radar stations. This Ground Directed Bombing (GDB) radar system could direct aircraft to their targets in inclement weather and in absolute darkness.

Thus began what many considered the most concentrated application of aerial firepower in the history of warfare. On an average day 350 tactical fighter- bombers, 60 B-52 Stratofortress, and 30 observation aircraft operated near the base. Westmoreland ordered Operation Igloo White to assist in the defense of Khe Sanh even though the system was only then undergoing its test and evaluation phase in Laos. On 20 January the first sensor drops took place by Observation Squadron Sixty-Seven (VO-67) and by the end of the month 316 acoustic and seismic sensors had been dropped in 44 strings. The Marines credited 40 percent of intelligence available to their fire support coordination center at the base to the sensors.

B-52 strikes supporting the Marines were originally restricted by the Marine commander, Colonel David E. Lownds, to bombing no closer than two miles from his front lines. The PAVN utilized this gap to move forward and "grab the enemy by the belt" and avoid the bombing. Momyer demonstrated the effectiveness of the Stratofortress as a tactical platform by bringing the B-52 strikes safely to within three-quarters of a mile of the base and the restriction was lifted. One PAVN prisoner reported that three-quarters of his entire regiment was lost to one B-52 raid alone.

Even though Westmoreland was concentrating an unprecedented amount of firepower against PAVN forces in the vicinity of Khe Sanh, he feared that it might not be enough. For the first time, the American commander seriously considered the use of a tactical nuclear weapon. In 1976, he revealed that "Although I established a small secret group to study the subject, Washington so feared that some word of it might manage to reach the press that I was told to desist."

During January, PAVN and the Marines contested the outlying hills for control of the high ground and carried out daily artillery and mortar duels. On 7 February, however, North Vietnamese infantry, backed by Soviet-built PT-76 tanks, overran the Special Forces border camp at Lang Vei, only seven miles west of Khe Sanh Combat Base. This was the first instance of the use of armor by PAVN during the conflict. Although the North Vietnamese continued to probe the American's defenses, the attack on Lang Vei was the last major effort by PAVN.

Canberra bombers operated by No. 2 Squadron, Royal Australian Air Force also flew close air support missions as part of Operation Niagara.

== Riddle of Khe Sanh ==
During the campaign, the USAF had flown 9,691 sorties and dropped 14,223 tons of bombs. The Marine Corps's aviation wing flew 7,098 sorties and carried 17,015 tons of mixed munitions. Naval aviation (even though concurrently conducting the bulk of Operation Rolling Thunder missions over the DRV) contributed 5,337 sorties and 7,941 tons of bombs. By the end of March the PAVN had begun to withdraw from the area. General Westmoreland, accepting Air Force estimates that claimed 9,800–13,000 PAVN troops killed or wounded, considered American air superiority to be an important contributor to the battle.

== Sources ==
- Littauer, Raphael and Norman Uphoff, eds, The Air War in Indochina. Boston: Beacon press, 1972.
- Morocco, John, Rain of Fire: Air War, 1969–1975. Boston: Boston Publishing Company, 1985.
