= XM22 =

XM22 may refer to either:

- Gravel mine, a small mine
- Stoner 63, a rifle
