= Seventh/Thirteenth Air Force =

Seventh/Thirteenth Air Force

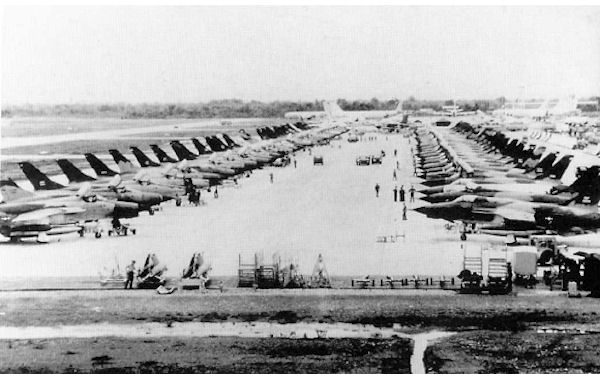
- F-105s on the flight line at Korat Royal Thai AFB in 1968
- Active: 1966–1973
- Country: United States
- Branch: United States Air Force
- Role: Operational control of combat forces
- Engagements: Vietnam War

Insignia
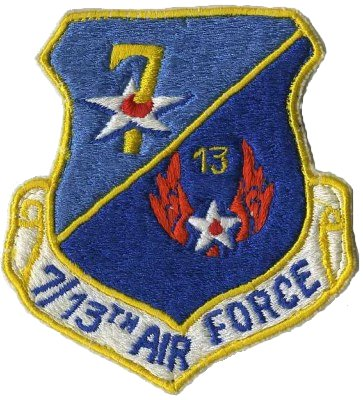
- Patch with Seventh/Thirteenth Air Force emblem

Seventh/Thirteenth Air Force was an operational headquarters that controlled United States Air Force tactical combat operations from Thailand during the Vietnam War. It was established in 1966 when Seventh Air Force replaced the 2d Air Division as the USAF headquarters in South Vietnam and was discontinued in 1973, when Seventh Air Force moved its headquarters from Vietnam to Thailand. Its combat units were attached to it for operations, but were assigned to Thirteenth Air Force in the Philippines for administration.

== History ==
Seventh/Thirteenth Air Force (7th/13th) was organized in April 1966 at Udorn Royal Thai Air Force Base, Thailand. It was assigned to Thirteenth Air Force at Clark Air Base in the Philippines for administrative control, but was under the operational control of Seventh Air Force at Tan Son Nhut Air Base, Republic of Vietnam. The commander of the unit was a deputy commander of both Seventh and Thirteenth Air Forces.

The establishment of 7th/13th was a result of the complicated command arrangements made by the United States for the control of airpower during its involvement in Southeast Asia. Initial involvement was entirely in Thirteenth Air Force's area of responsibility, although it had little direct involvement with actual operations. When the expansion of forces in South Vietnam resulted in the establishment of 2d Air Division as the headquarter for those forces, the air division still reported to Thirteenth Air Force. The establishment of Seventh Air Force on a coequal level, however, made the establishment of a new operational headquarters a necessity.

Thai sensitivities about units based in Thailand reporting to a headquarters in South Vietnam caused a shift whereby the Seventh Air Force was ostensibly subordinate to Thirteenth Air Force for administrative matters (and therefore referred to as 7/13 Air Force).

Tactical air operations were controlled by Seventh Air Force. However, those in North Vietnam were controlled by Pacific Command, operating through Pacific Air Forces and Task Force 77. Those in South Vietnam were controlled through Military Assistance Command Vietnam. Strikes in Laos were split, with northern (Barrel Roll) and central Laos treated like North Vietnam, while those in the south (most of the Steel Tiger area) were treated like South Vietnam, with the additional complication that they also had to be approved by the U.S. ambassador to Laos. (Note: Further complications arose from President Lyndon Johnson's insistence on personally approving all targets in North Vietnam. Correll.)

The mission of 7th/13th was originally to control tactical forces stationed in Thailand in the conduct of Operation Rolling Thunder, bombing operations in the Democratic Republic of Vietnam, which were already underway when it was formed and would continue until 1968. It also carried out interdiction missions against the People's Army of Vietnam's logistical network in southeastern Laos known as the Ho Chi Minh Trail; and to support the clandestine war in northern Laos. After 1 November 1968, Rolling Thunder came to an end and the unit focused on its Laotian operations. The 7th/13th later participated in Operation Commando Hunt, which was supported by the sensors and computers of Operation Igloo White, based at Nakhon Phanom Royal Thai Air Force Base, Thailand.

At the peak of its operations in 1968, the unit controlled 35,000 personnel and 600 aircraft. It was discontinued when Seventh Air Force moved its headquarters to Nakon Phanom in 1973.

== Lineage ==
- Organized on 1 April 1966
- Disestablished on 29 March 1973

=== Stations ===
- Udorn Royal Thai Air Force Base, Thailand, 1 April 1966 – 29 March 1973

=== Components ===
- 8th Tactical Fighter Wing, attached 1 April 1966 – 29 March 1973
- 56th Air Commando Wing (later 56th Special Operations Wing), attached 1 April 1966 – 29 March 1973
- 355th Tactical Fighter Wing, attached 1 April 1966 – 10 December 1970
- 388th Tactical Fighter Wing, attached 1 April 1966 – 14 February 1973
- 432d Tactical Reconnaissance Wing (later 432d Tactical Fighter Wing), attached 18 September 1966 – 29 March 1973
- 553d Reconnaissance Wing, attached 31 October 1967 – 15 December 1970
