= Operation Igloo White =

American electronic surveillance strategy during the Vietnam War

- Part of the Vietnam War
Date	1968–1973
Location	Southern Laos
Result	See below

Belligerents
United States; Thailand	North Vietnam

Operation Igloo White was a covert United States joint military electronic warfare operation conducted from late January 1968 until February 1973, during the Vietnam War. These missions were carried out by the 553rd Reconnaissance Wing, a U.S. Air Force unit flying modified EC-121R Warning Star aircraft, and VO-67, a specialized U.S. Navy unit flying highly modified OP-2E Neptune aircraft. This state-of-the-art operation utilized electronic sensors, computers, and communications relay aircraft in an attempt to automate intelligence collection. The system would then assist in the direction of strike aircraft to their targets. The objective of those attacks was the logistical system of the People's Army of Vietnam (PAVN) that snaked through southeastern Laos and was known as the Ho Chi Minh Trail (the Truong Son Road to the North Vietnamese).

== Establishment of Igloo White ==
The idea of a system to interdict North Vietnamese infiltration into South Vietnam had been proposed in the years before 1965 and finally led to the construction of a defensive barrier system including electronic sensors, which is best known as the McNamara Line, on January 13, 1967, when President Johnson authorized the construction. The defensive barrier system project had many cover name changes, such as Practice Nine until 14 June 1967, Illinois City (June 1967), Dye Marker (September 1967), Muscle Shoals (September 13, 1967) and finally Igloo White (June 1968). When the air-supported subsystem in eastern and central Laos was added in 1967, the project was named Muscle Shoals. In June 1968, when the program was renamed Igloo White, it consisted of three components:

- Munitions and sensing devices which were placed across and along suspected routes of infiltration to detect and impede enemy foot or vehicular movement;
- Orbiting aircraft which received signals from these sensors, amplified them, and retransmitted them;
- An Infiltration Surveillance Center (ISC) which received the transmitted signals from the aircraft and analyzed them to produce reliable tactical information for planning and interdiction operations.

The Igloo White system was originally expected to impede enemy infiltration through the use of minefields and aid in determining when mine reseeding was necessary. Sensors were also to be used along trails and roads to provide real-time target information for 3 tactical airstrikes. By July 1968, the munitions had proved to be relatively ineffective, and the use of sensors to obtain reconnaissance information was rapidly becoming the principal objective of the Igloo White system.

== Effective implementation ==
Igloo White was rushed into service during the Battle of Khe Sanh and successfully passed its first operational test. Combined with Operation Commando Hunt in 1969, the system served as the keystone of the U.S. aerial interdiction effort of the Vietnam War.

Igloo White was a costly operation, with design and construction estimated at between $1 and $1.7 billion, and operating costs of approximately $1 billion per year over its five-year duration. It employed a range of advanced surveillance technologies, but its effectiveness remains subject to debate.

== Development ==
As early as June 1961, General Maxwell D. Taylor, President John F. Kennedy's special military representative, had become interested in the prospect of erecting a physical barrier to halt the increasing infiltration of PAVN materiel (and later, manpower) through their Laotian logistical corridor and into the border regions of the Republic of Vietnam (South Vietnam). He then held talks with the deputy director of the Pentagon's Office of Special Operations, Edward G. Lansdale, who convinced him that a better solution to the infiltration dilemma would be the creation of mobile units to attack the infiltrators.

After the initiation of the strategic aerial bombardment of North Vietnam (Operation Rolling Thunder) in March 1965, Washington saw that program as its chief method of relaying signals to Hanoi to cease its support of the southern insurgency. When that failed as a strategy, the aerial effort was redirected to serve as an anti-infiltration campaign. After a million sorties were flown and more than three-quarters of a million tons of bombs were dropped, Rolling Thunder came to an end at the direction of President Lyndon B. Johnson on 11 November 1968.

As early as 1966 Secretary of Defense Robert S. McNamara had become disenchanted with Rolling Thunder. In January McNamara was presented with a working paper by the American academic Roger Fisher, who proposed a less costly physical and electronic barrier that would be located in South Vietnam. It was to consist of a 216-mile (348 km) long, 500-yard (460 m) wide barrier that would stretch from the South China Sea south of the Demilitarized Zone (DMZ), across the Laotian frontier and on to the border of Thailand. The physical barrier itself would be supported by electronic sensors and extensive minefields. Fisher estimated that it would take approximately five U.S. divisions to erect and defend the system.

The Joint Chiefs and CINCPAC turned down the concept, believing that it would consume the efforts of too many troops and create a logistical nightmare. McNamara, however, was intrigued. Ignoring the military chiefs, he approached the Institute for Defense Analyses and requested that it fund a study of the concept. The project was then handed over to the Jason Division (also referred to as the Jason Group or Jason Committee), a group of 67 scientists who were to study and develop the technology necessary to make the physical/electronic barrier feasible. The group concentrated its efforts in three key areas: communications; data processing and display; and sensor development. On 15 September 1966, McNamara made Army General Alfred D. Starbird the head of the newly formed Defense Communications Planning Group (DCPG), which was to oversee the implementation of the program. The barrier concept was then given the designation Practice Nine. The DCPG's original mission profile, as of September 1966, was simply to implement the anti-infiltration system devised by the Jason Division. The original plan foresaw the deployment of both a physical barrier in addition to an air-supported barrier using various electronic sensors.

In June 1967 the barrier project, by then referred to as the Strong Point Obstacle System (or SPOS) was renamed Illinois City, which lasted for a month before the program was redesignated Dyemarker. On 6 July, groundbreaking ceremonies were conducted for the command center of the operation. Construction work was completed three months later. The new Infiltration Surveillance Center (ISC) was located at Nakhon Phanom, Thailand, nine miles (14 km) west of Nakhon Phanom city on the banks of the Mekong River. The first commander of the unit was Air Force Brigadier General William P. McBride, whose superior was the deputy commander of the Seventh/Thirteenth Air Force at Udon Thani, Thailand. From its creation the ISC (and the operations conducted from it) was known as Task Force Alpha.

On 8 September 1967, the electronic portion of Dyemarker was divided and the aerial, sensor-based portion was designated Muscle Shoals. On 1 June 1968, the aerial portion was redesignated Igloo White. That name became the most associated with the program though various elements received a number of separate codenames. All resources for Dyemarker/Muscle Shoals were redesignated Duck Blind in April 1968, and in June 1968 Muscle Shoals outright became Duel Blade. In October 1968 Duck Blind was changed to Duffel Bag.

In mid-1968, the physical barrier concept was pushed aside after the North Vietnamese overran the Lang Vei Special Forces camp and besieged Khe Sanh. The barrier concept was reduced to an aerial, sensor-based electronic interdiction program that was to be conducted in Laos.

== Sensors and Weapons ==
The Defense Communications Planning Group's research and development program created an advanced technological system. Muscle Shoals would consist of three interdependent parts. First, there were air-dropped, battery-powered acoustic and seismic sensors. The camouflaged sensors were to be dropped in strings at predetermined geographical points along the PAVN logistical network. Once emplaced, they would serve as tripwires to any movement or activity along the system.

The first sensors utilized by the program were Air-Delivered Seismic Intrusion Detector (ADSID), which had been developed from devices then in use in underground mapping for the oil industry. The device could sense vertical earth motion by the use of an internal geophone and could determine whether a man or a vehicle was in motion at a range of 33 and 109 yards (30 and 100 m) respectively. The first acoustic sensors were developed from the U.S. Navy's Project Jezebel anti-submarine warfare sonobuoys, which recorded and processed sound by the utilization of an audio spectrum analyzer. The first model of seismic detectors (Phase I) outshone their contemporary acoustic types in the quality and quantity of the information they reported. The Phase I models of both the acoustic and seismic sensors were only available for operation in a continuous mode, which meant that under normal conditions, their lithium batteries would function for approximately 30 days.

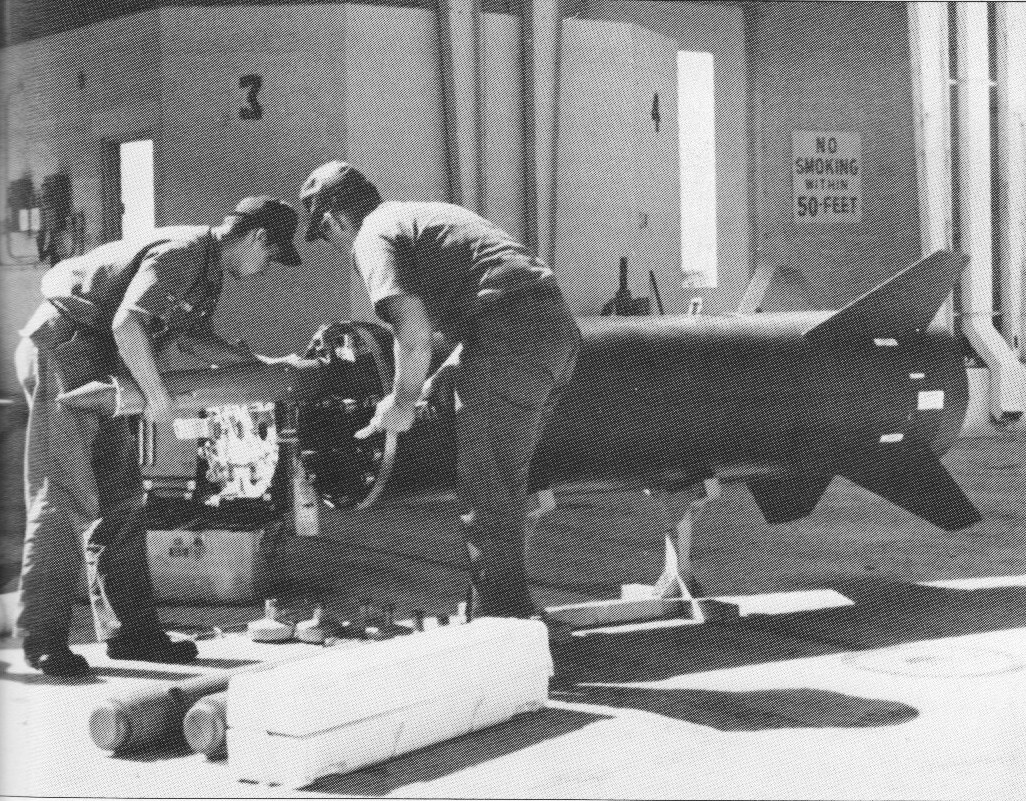
Air Force ordnancemen load a dispenser with seismic sensors

The Acoustic Seismic Intrusion Detector (ACOUSID), combined the operations of both seismic and acoustic devices, with the added ability to transmit sound from a built-in microphone. The ACOUSID had three switchable detection modes: in the C mode, a line spectrum detector determined the presence of enemy vehicles and had an effective range of 1,094 yards (1,000 m); an I Mode which was activated by sounds picked up by its internal microphone and could detect personnel at a range of 438 yards (401 m); and a B Mode that combined both of the above abilities and operated in a continuous real-time mode of 40 activations per hour with a battery life of 30 days.

The sensors reported their data via radio frequency channels ranging upward from 162 megahertz (MHz) to 174 MHz on the very high frequency band. 31 channels were assigned to each type of sensor with a 375 kHz separation between each channel. Every channel contained 27 identification codes or addresses which could be set in the field prior to emplacement. Thus, a total of 837 individual sensors (27×31) could be deployed at any one time without signal duplication in a single operational zone.

The deployment of gravel mines and the Wide-Area Anti-Personnel Mine System became integral parts of the operation. Other weapons were specifically developed or otherwise became associated with the campaign as well. These notably included the BLU-31/B and Mk 36 air-dropped mines, BLU-43/B and BLU-44/B landmine system (Dragontooth), the BLU-72/B fuel-air explosive (Pave Pat), and the BLU-52/A chemical bomb (filled with bulk CS-2 powder). Anti-vehicle operations in support of Muscle Shoals/Igloo White were designated Mud River, while anti-personnel operations received the codename Dump Truck.

PAVN personnel moving on foot through the trail system would be detected by the detonation of air-sown, aspirin-sized, wide-area gravel mines, which would activate the sensors. Subsequent bomb damage assessment missions and hand emplacement of sensors and mines in support of Muscle Shoals would be carried out by the reconnaissance teams of the highly classified Military Assistance Command, Vietnam Studies and Observations Group (SOG). A number of hand emplaced units were developed for this role, including the MICROSID and MINISID, and a device designed to work with either called MAGID, a magnetic detector, designed to be triggered by amounts of metal as small as an infantry rifle.

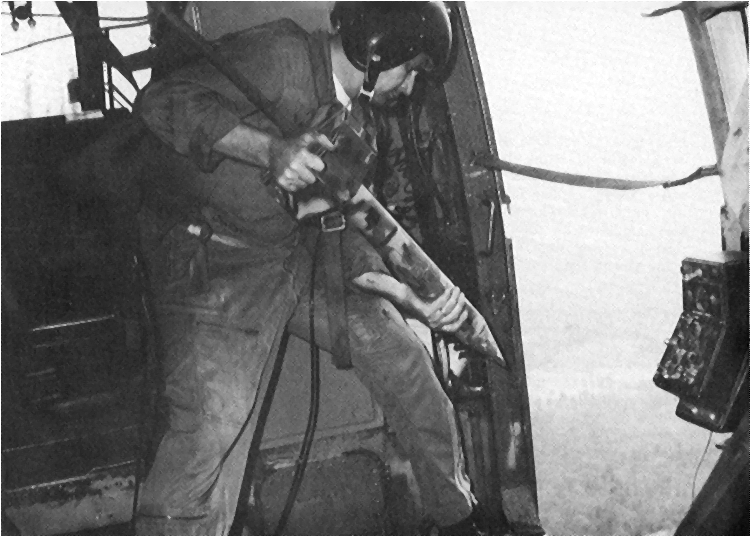
Gravity deployment of a sensor during the Battle of Khe Sanh,1967

The sensors were designed for air deployment by either of two means. The first was by parachute, which would hang the devices in trees, where they appeared to be part of the foliage. The second method was the use of gravity, which would drive the spike-shaped device into the ground like a lawn dart, burying all but their antennae, which were designed to appear as weeds. Surprisingly, approximately 80 percent of the air-dropped sensors were found to be operational after delivery.

The second phase of sensor development improved the older models by providing for non-continuous operation as directed by the ISC. They also had the capability of carrying out three separate reporting functions: to report current information (transmitting noises or earth tremors); to keep silent, but to count impulses and respond when queried; or to remain in constant operation like the Phase I models. Their batteries also provided the ability to operate for approximately 15 days longer than the Phase I models (45 days).

During late 1969, Phase IV sensors began to be deployed in-theater. These had a greater number of available communications channels, which allowed the seeding of a larger sensor field without fear of signal interference. By 1971–1972 a new sensor with a commandable microphone (COMMMIKE III) and another with a vehicle ignition detector (EDET III, which could detect the unshielded ignition systems of gasoline engines) were introduced. In 1972 U.S. dollars the ADSID cost $619.00, the ACOUSID $1,452.00, and the engine detector $2,997.00. During the life of the operation approximately 20,000 sensors were deployed in Laos.

== Analysis of sensor results ==
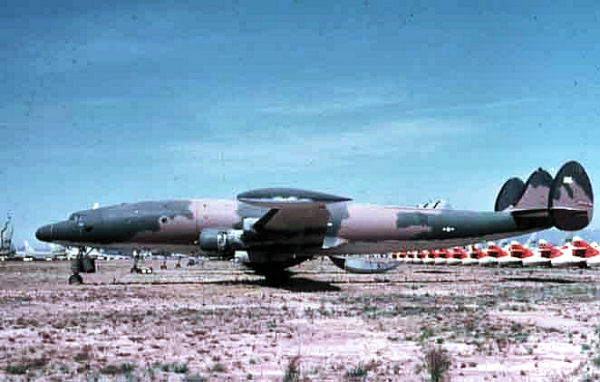
Former EC-121R Batcat at AMARC, Davis-Monthan AFB, Arizona

The sensor transmitters would relay their data to the second element of the system, an orbiting EC-121R aircraft of the Air Force's 553rd Reconnaissance Wing, based at Korat Royal Thai Air Force Base. The EC-121s would then relay the collected information via a radio link at 2200 to 2300 MHz to Nakhon Phanom. At Task Force Alpha, the last of the three components in the system, the intelligence data (from a variety of sources, not just the sensors) would be entered, collated, retrieved, and stored by two IBM 360/40 (later two 360/65) computers. Technicians at the center controlled the system from a variety of video displays that were also linked to the computers.

Analysts at the 200,000-square-foot (19,000 m^{2}) center concentrated on such arcane topics as pathway predictions, delay intervals, route segments, and choke points. The computers analyzed sensor data and compiled intelligence information and then made predictions as to where and when a particular PAVN truck convoy would be geographically located. According to author John Prados, the system functioned "exactly like a pinball machine... in truth, the mavens of the electronic battlefield became pinball wizards".

The effectiveness of the system was determined not by how long a sensor would last in the field, but by the adequacy of coverage by a particular string of sensors. For instance, a well placed string with several failed sensors was more effective than a fully functional string placed in the wrong location. The electronic data was, however, only as good as the human analysts and operators at the ISC. The knack of timely sensor activation depended on careful study of device locations and the patterns of PAVN logistical behavior.

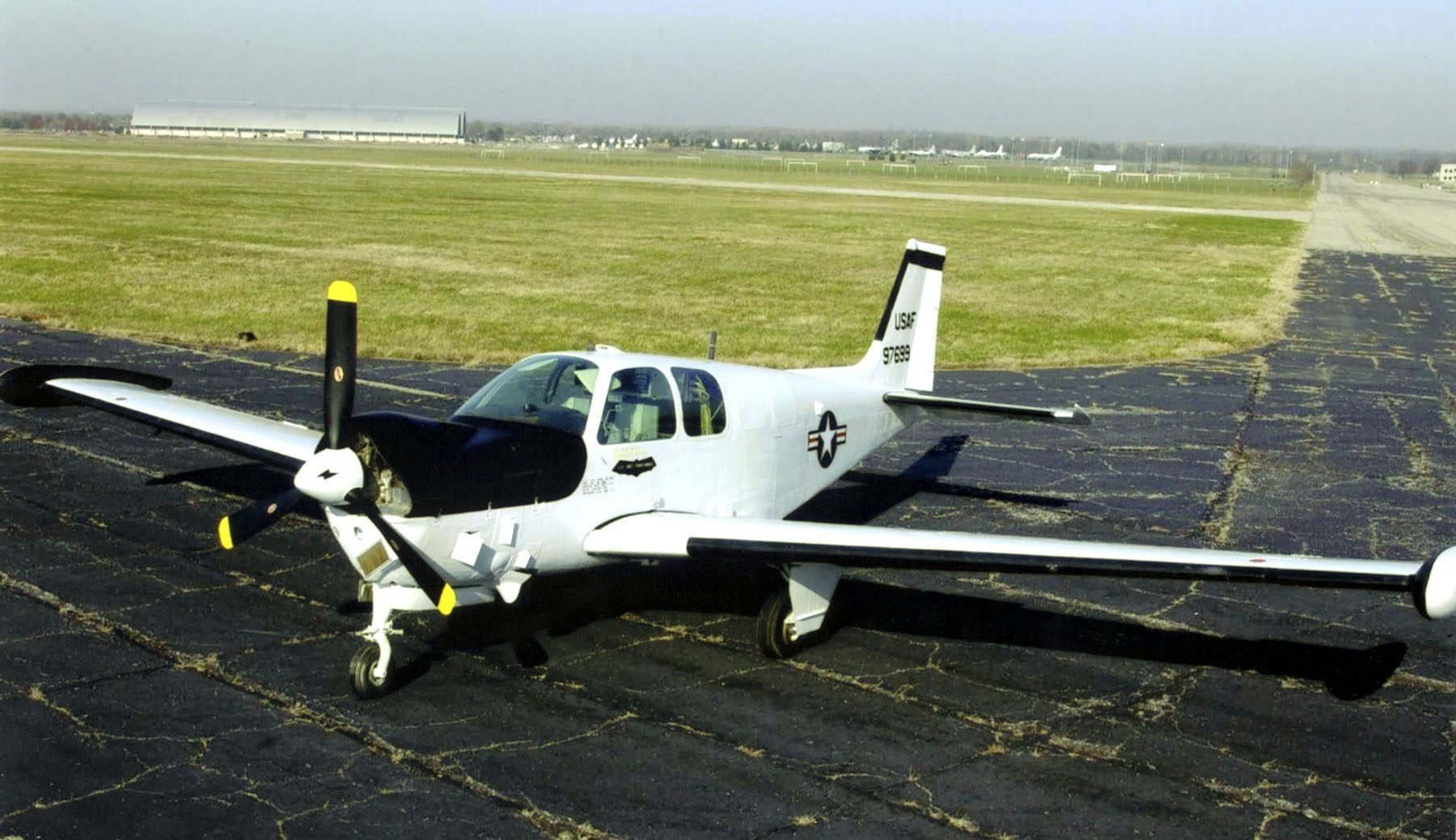
QU-22B Pave Eagle

The sensors were delivered to the target areas by U.S. Navy OP-2 Neptunes of VO-67 or by U.S. Air Force helicopters, both based at Nakhon Phanom. Due to increasing PAVN anti-aircraft artillery defences encountered in southeastern Laos, delivery in high-risk areas of the trail system was handed over from the Neptunes to Air Force F-4 Phantom II fighter-bombers that had been specially equipped for the missions.

U.S. strike aircraft were directed to predicted target areas by a variety of means. The first was for the ISC to relay target information to an airborne battlefield command and control center (ABCCC), which then routed bombers to a forward air control aircraft (FAC). The FAC then led the strike to the target. During inclement weather or complete darkness, aircraft could still attack the trail by utilizing either MSQ-77 Combat Skyspot (a radar-directed system) or LORAN (a radio-directed navigational system).

As the program (and PAVN air defences) evolved, so did the relay aircraft. The EC-121Rs and their crews proved too vulnerable and were partly replaced in 1969 and 1970 by QU-22Bs which were to be remotely piloted, and which had undergone primary mission equipment and PME flight tests at Eglin Air Force Base, Florida, in 1968. The aircraft suffered from mechanical difficulties, however, and were never flown during an operational mission without a pilot. They were replaced by C-130B models in December 1971.

== Operations in Laos ==
On 25 November 1967, Muscle Shoals began to undergo field testing and evaluation in southeastern Laos. This process was stopped by the battle of Khe Sanh, when an estimated three PAVN divisions approached, and then surrounded the Marine outpost in western Quang Tri Province adjacent to Laos. The U.S. commander in Vietnam, General William C. Westmoreland, ordered Task Force Alpha to support the aerial effort to defend the base (Operation Niagara). On 22 January, the first of 316 sensors were implanted around and near Khe Sanh in 44 strings by Navy squadron VO-67.

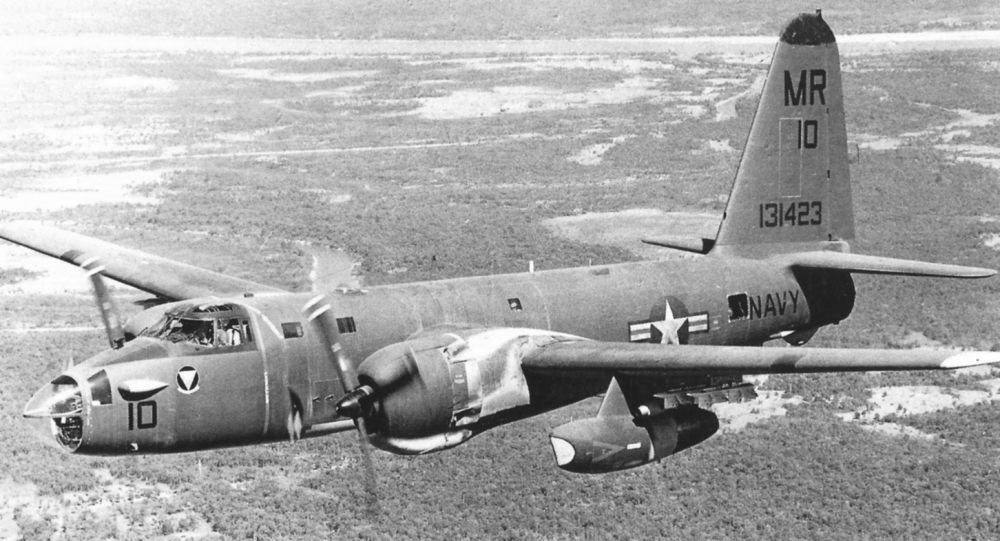
U.S. Navy OP-2E Neptune of VO-67, a variant of a naval patrol bomber and anti-submarine warfare aircraft specifically developed for the Muscle Shoals mission.

Although the Marine Direct Air Support Center was at first reluctant to trust the sensors (which in fact replaced ground patrolling), they were soon convinced of their utility. The Marines credited 40 percent of intelligence available to the Khe Sanh fire support coordination center to the sensors. General Westmoreland was ecstatic about Task Force Alpha's contribution to the victory at Khe Sanh. He had been one of the few high-ranking military officers that had supported the barrier concept since its planning stages.

With the conclusion of aerial operations around Khe Sanh and the close out of the Marine base, the focus of Igloo White (as the operation was redesignated in June) turned once again to Laos. On 15 November 1968, the Seventh/Thirteenth Air Force had inaugurated Operation Commando Hunt, a series of continuous interdiction operations against the Ho Chi Minh Trail that would continue until the end of American participation in the war. For the next four years Igloo White and Commando Hunt would be interlinked in the anti-infiltration effort.

With the advent of Igloo White/Commando Hunt, the aerial interdiction effort entered a new phase. Armed reconnaissance – the patrolling of known segments of the trail system by aircraft searching for targets of opportunity – gave way to strikes directed by the sensor system. That is not to say the Task Force Alpha had operational control of the aircraft that carried out the missions. The Seventh Air Force was not about to surrender the single air manager control that it had just fought so hard to obtain. Task Force Alpha supported the Seventh by gathering, analyzing, and disseminating intelligence. This intelligence was delivered from Nakhon Phanom to the Seventh's headquarters at Ton Son Nhut Air Base, where it issued the strike orders. The ABCCCs were also under the control of the Seventh, not Task Force Alpha.

The only exception to this arrangement was Operation Commando Bolt, a real-time, LORAN-based technique which utilized sensor strike zones derived from predicted target locations. These missions were coordinated by Task Force Alpha's Sycamore control center against targets that passed through strike modules (four strings of three to six sensors each). Air controllers at Sycamore then directly delivered the correct course, altitude, and speed necessary for the strike aircraft to deliver their ordnance to the correct coordinates.

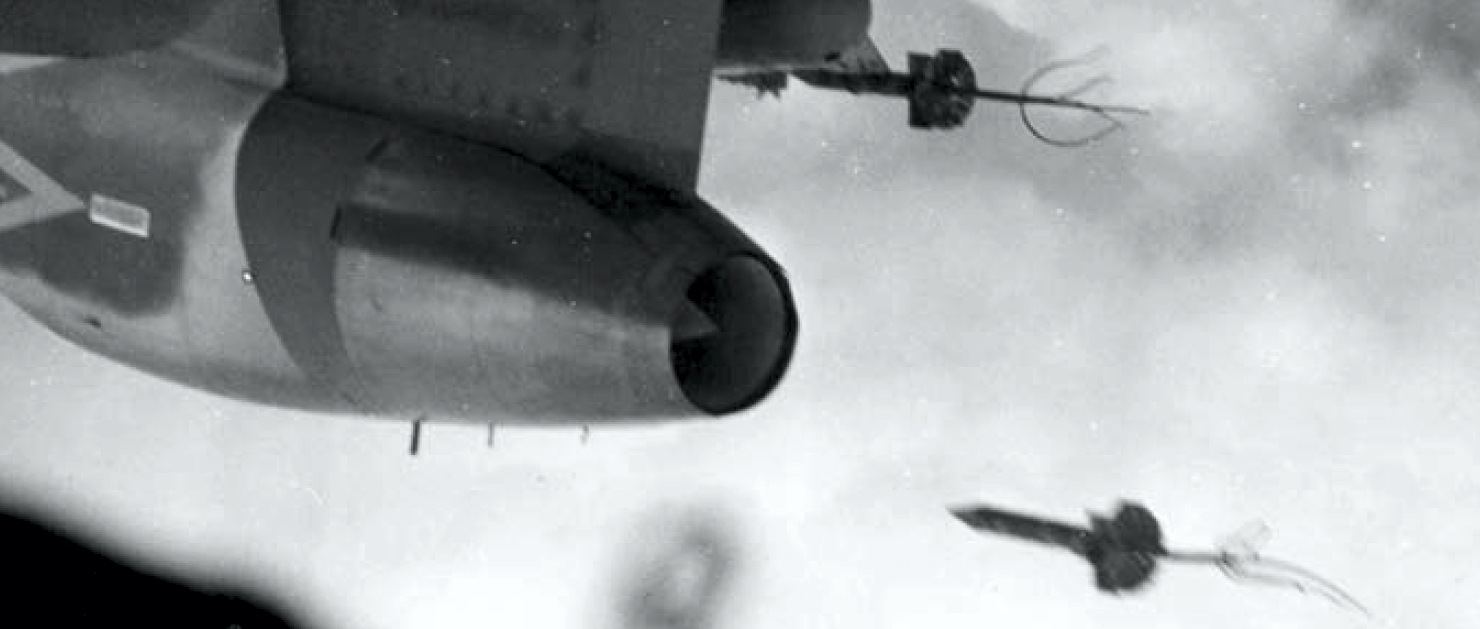
An OP-2E dropping a sesmic sensor.

There were some initial problems with the system. During Operation Commando Hunt I, for example, there were so many aircraft piling up in the air space over southern Laos that the air controllers and FACs could not keep track of them. Pilots, many of whom were veterans of Rolling Thunder, tended to arrive over the area in large waves instead of spacing out their arrivals over time. One technical failure, however, would have huge ramifications for the entire program. The anti-personnel system, which was based on the dispersal of wide-area gravel mines (the explosions of which would activate acoustic sensors) failed completely. The mines deteriorated too rapidly in the heat and humidity of Laos, thereby negating the system.

The North Vietnamese response to the threat posed by the sensors was swift. If PAVN troops could detect the general location of a sensor, they immediately began to search out others and destroy them. Another response was to simply avoid them. The final evolution of anti-sensor measures was to attempt to deceive them. The chief protection of the sensors proved to be the dense foliage that covered the majority of the logistical system.

== Operations in South Vietnam ==
While the electronic barrier program in Laos became the most visible part of the anti-infiltration program, the physical barrier project in South Vietnam was largely abandoned after 1968 in favor of mobile operations. The SPOS outlined in the original Dyemarker plan envisioned a virtual defensive wall stretching from the South China Sea to Dong Ha Mountain. The plan called for a fence, a line of twin steel apron and barbed steel tape, an anti-personnel mine field, a passive sensor detection system, and another line of twin steel apron and barbed steel tape, to "trace" this path, providing a physical obstacle to enemy infiltration. Observation posts and towers would line the route, and six specifically designed strong points would be constructed, with associated battalion base areas. A combined force of a single US Marine Corps Regiment and a single ARVN Regiment were to man these positions.

The 3rd Naval Construction Battalion designed fighting and living bunkers for the route, presenting them for tests and evaluation 1968, both in CONUS and in Vietnam. Also, 28 January 1968, COMUSMACV provided its own guidance for the planned creation of the ARVN Dyemarker Regiment. COMUSMACV envisioned a Regiment of 5 4-company Battalions and an Armored Cavalry Squadron. On 30 January, COMUSMACV informed the commander of III MAF of their proposed mission to augment the proposed ARVN force manning the barrier. The ARVN 2nd Regiment, of its 1st Infantry Division became earmarked for the barrier mission.

On 29 October 1968, work was stopped on the physical SPOS barrier, by that time redesignated as Duel Blade, under MACV Planning Directive 10–67, citing changes in the overall force posture, both enemy and friendly. The physical barrier would be replaced by the revised Duel Blade plan of active resistance utilizing air strikes, artillery and naval bombardment and mobile reaction forces. Base sites already constructed or under construction were to be used as support bases for the revised operation plan.

== Other applications ==
Though Igloo White's primary focus was monitoring traffic along the Ho Chi Minh Trail, the DCPG's mission had been expanded to include sensors for a "wide range of tactical applications," as well as, a "Ground Tactical System" in 1968. The Ground Tactical System was envisioned as a tool for ground commanders in defending fire bases and other secured areas against attack, and was eventually employed around Khe Sanh. It was also noted that the US border patrol was testing the sensor equipment as a method of protecting US continental borders. Sensor equipment was deployed by July 1969 in South Vietnam for the purposes of countering boobytrapping and mining teams. A total of 56 sensors were diverted to the problem as a test, with testimony that vehicle losses were reduced by 50 percent in the first month.

== Conclusion ==
Scholars today remain divided on the merits of the electronic barrier system and the efficacy of the bombing campaigns that it directed. The claims of destruction made by the U.S. Air Force, both during and after the war, were originally taken as given. The only exception to this rule was at the CIA, which discounted Air Force claims at the time by as much as 75 percent. This was understandable due to the fact that the Vietnamese were basically silent during the 1970s and 1980s.

By the 1990s, new historical research (especially by Air Force historians Earl Tilford, Bernard Nalty, and Jacob Van Staaveren) and the publications of the Military Institute of Vietnam finally opened new perspectives on aerial interdiction during the Vietnam War. The Seventh Air Force claimed that 46,000 PAVN trucks had been destroyed or damaged by air strikes during its tenure (with nineteen thousand of these occurring during Command Hunt V 1970–1971). While the North Vietnamese only imported 6,000 trucks into North Vietnam between 1968 and 1970 (for all of their operations), imports increased dramatically in 1971, though these also seem to have been as a result of the planned 1972 offensive. American claims that 80 percent of the materiel that started down the trail was destroyed while en route to the southern battlefields had to be altered in the face of loss claims of only 15 percent by the Vietnamese.

Thomas C. Thayer, chief of the Advanced Research Projects Agency for four years during the war, believed that only about one-twentieth of the cargo imported into the north moved southward on the Ho Chi Minh Trail and that more than two-thirds eventually reached the battlefields in the south. More recently however, a new study by Air Force historian Eduard Mark established a correlation between trucks imported into North Vietnam during the war and those that were claimed by the American pilots as destroyed. Access to communist Vietnamese archives to scholarly research may add to the true effectiveness (or lack thereof) of the American electronic and aerial effort.

The operation was also expensive. Igloo White cost around one billion dollars per year to operate. The cost of the bombing operations that the sensors supported amounted to approximately 18.2 million dollars per week. Those costs did not include the hundreds of aircraft lost during the interdiction campaigns or their crews.
