= McNamara Line =

US operational strategy during the Vietnam War

The McNamara Line was an operational strategy employed by the United States in 1966–1968 during the Vietnam War, aimed to prevent infiltration of South Vietnam by People's Army of Vietnam (PAVN) forces from North Vietnam and Laos. Physically, the McNamara Line was to run across South Vietnam along the Vietnamese Demilitarized Zone (DMZ) from Cửa Việt to the Laotian border at Mường Phìn, Laos. The line included fortified bases along with stretches where roads and trails were guarded by high-tech acoustic and heat-detecting sensors on the ground and interdicted from the air. Assorted types of mines, including so-called gravel mines, and troops at choke points backed sophisticated electronic surveillance. Named the barrier system by Robert McNamara (United States Secretary of Defense from 1961 to 1968), it was one of the key elements, along with gradual aerial bombing, of his war strategy in Vietnam.

== Barrier concept ==
Various schemes had been proposed in the years before 1965 for a defensive line on the northern border of South Vietnam and in southeast Laos. These schemes had generally been rejected because of their requirements for large amounts of military personnel to be deployed in static positions and because any barrier in Laos would encourage the Vietnamese to deploy their forces deeper into Laotian territory.

In December 1965, Robert McNamara met twice with Carl Kaysen, a former Kennedy-era National Security Council staff member. Kaysen proposed an electronic barrier to limit infiltration from North Vietnam. McNamara embraced the idea and asked Kaysen to create a proposal. Starting in January, John McNaughton and a group of scientists in Cambridge, Massachusetts, including Kaysen and Roger Fisher created the proposal which was submitted to McNamara in March 1966, who then passed it to the Joint Chiefs of Staff (JCS) for comments. The JCS response was that the proposal would still require an infeasible number of troops to be stationed along the barrier and would present difficult construction/logistical problems.

Also in late 1965 or early 1966, Jerry Wiesner and George Kistiakowsky persuaded McNamara to support a summer study program in Cambridge for the group of 47 prominent scientists and academics that made up the JASON advisory division of the Institute for Defense Analysis. The subject of the study was to find alternatives to the majorly unsuccessful gradual aerial bombing campaign in North Vietnam advocated by McNamara. As Kaysen and the others involved in the Cambridge group were all members of JASON scientific advisory group, the anti-infiltration barrier ideas were included in the JASON agenda.

=== JASON study group ===
The JASON study group meetings took place June 16–25, 1966 at Dana Hall in Wellesley, Massachusetts. The buildings were guarded day and night and attendees were given top secret security clearances. After the summer meetings, a report was produced over the course of July and August.

The JASON report of August 1966 called the bombing campaign against North Vietnam a failure, saying that it had "no measurable direct effect on Hanoi's ability to mount and support military operations in the South". Instead, advisors proposed as an alternative two defensive barriers. The first barrier would run from the coast some distance inland along the DMZ and would seek to block PAVN infiltration through conventional means. The second barrier would run from the remote western areas of the border into Laos and would be a barrier of air interdiction, mine fields and electronic detection requiring minimal troops. While the JCS report had estimated the construction of a barrier would take up to four years, the JASON report suggested the barrier could be in place with available resources within a year. That was important to McNamara since he hoped that by cutting the logistics lines between the North and the South he would have been able to press Hanoi into negotiations.

=== Decision-making ===
In September 1966, McNamara presented the JASON group report to the JCS. It split on the proposal with the service chiefs being against it, and general Earle Wheeler, the chairman of JCS, being in support. The JCS then handed the report off to the Commander-in-Chief, Pacific (CINCPAC) Admiral Sharp, who wrote back that the barrier idea was impractical from a manpower and construction point of view. COMUSMACV General William Westmoreland, was apprehensive of the idea and reportedly was even afraid that the barrier would go into history as Westmoreland's Folly.

Despite all disagreements, on 15 September 1966, without waiting for the final judgment of the JCS, McNamara ordered that the proposal be implemented. Lieutenant General Alfred Starbird, director of the Defense Communications Agency, was appointed head of Task Force 728, which was to implement the project. Two days later, the JCS reported back favorably on the already-decided plan. Starbird had to complete the barrier by September 1967. In November 1966, McNamara officially recommended the barrier system to President Johnson for implementation. The construction budget was estimated as $1.5 billion, and $740 million was allocated for the annual operating costs. The Practice Nine was adopted as the barrier project internal communication code name. and a vital component of his operational strategy. It was an enormous multimillion project, which was nicknamed in the media as the Great Wall of Vietnam, McNamara's Wall, McNamara Barrier, Electric Fence, and Alarm Belt.

== Chronology ==
On 13 January 1967, Johnson authorized the construction, and it was assigned the highest national priority.

=== Cover name changes ===
In June 1967, an existence of Practice Nine was leaked to the press. The project was then renamed as Illinois City and in September it was called Project Dye Marker. Further, it was also referred to as SPOS (Strong-point-obstacle-system), with two different components, Dump Truck (anti-vehicle) and Mud River (anti-personnel), which were collectively referred to as Muscle Shoals. On 13 September 1967, the project's Dye Marker name was switched to Muscle Shoals, and in June 1968 it was changed again, this time to Igloo White.

=== 1967 ===
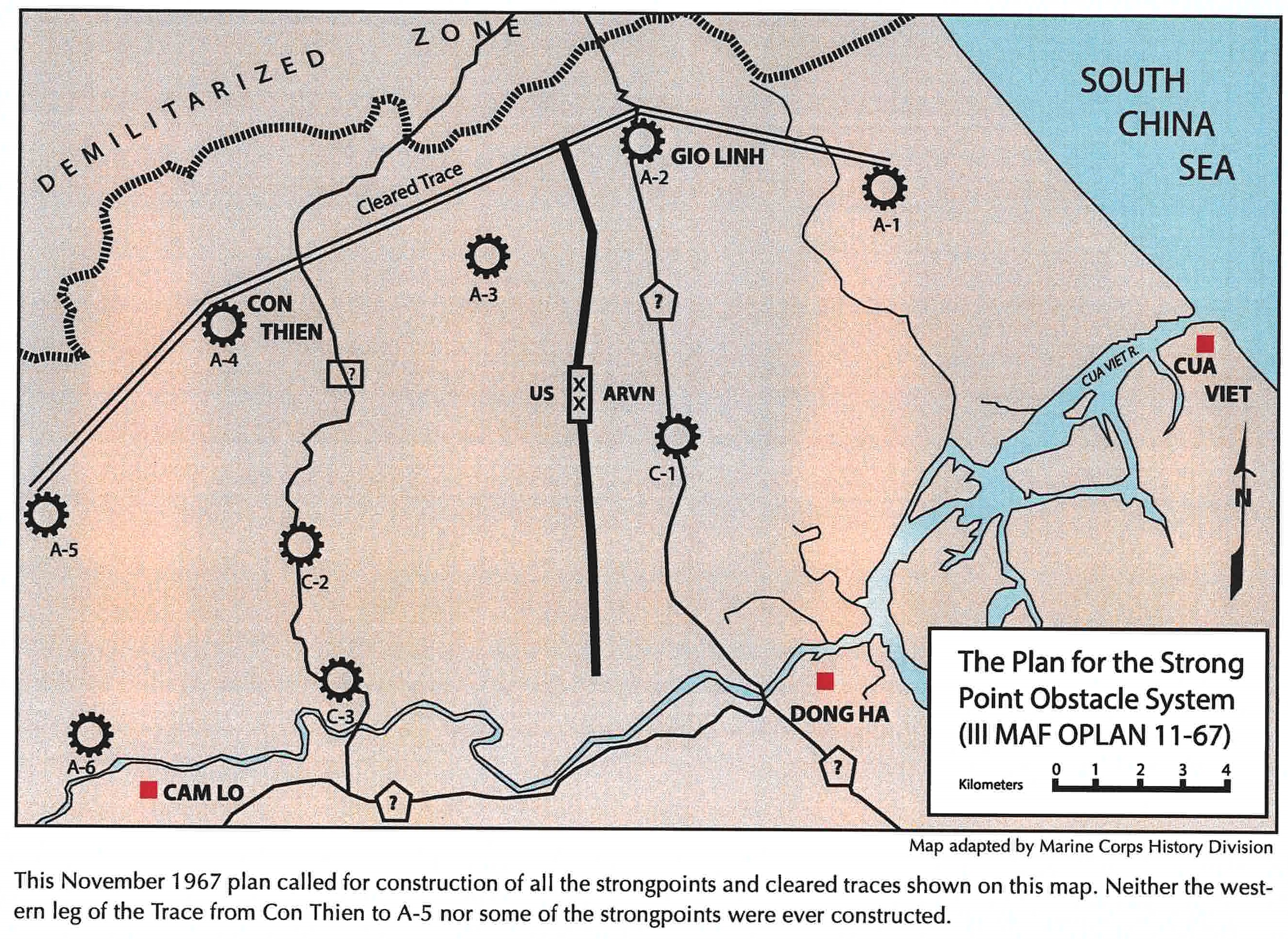
Map of "The Trace"

USMC engineers in early 1967 were ordered to bulldoze a strip to at least 500 meters wide from Gio Linh westward to Con Thien. This became known by the Marines as The Trace. Construction began in the summer 1967 and was announced on September 7, 1967. Construction was carried out by the 3rd Marine Division. First, the 11th Engineers started to work on bulldozing the so-called Trace, a path 600 meter wide and 11 kilometers long that was stripped of trees, brush and villages if needed. The backbone of the strong-point system were fortified bases Alpha 2 at Gio Linh on the east, Alpha 4 at Con Thien on the west, and Alpha 3 in between. 7,578 American marines had been deployed in support of Dye Marker strong point/obstacle system by 1 November 1967. In addition, 4,080 American troops have been involved in the air-supported anti-infiltration part of Dye Marker.

The Dye Marker defensive line project stretched along the DMZ starting from the South China Sea, and had a total length of 76 kilometers (47 miles). Some parts of the defensive line were manned and equipped with the bunkers, outposts, reinforcing and fire support bases, surrounded by concertina wire. Other segments were under constant radar, motion and acoustic surveillance, and secured by trip wires, mine fields, and barbed-wire entanglements. The airborne receiving equipment carried by EC-121R's relayed the signals and triggered artillery and bombers responses.

The plans that were leaked to the media called for an inexpensive barbed wire fence with watch towers, and they were presented to the public as a trivial measure, while the electronic part was highly classified. In reality, the strong-point part of the anti-infiltration system was reinforced with electronic sensors and gravel mines to stop the flow of PAVN troops and supplies through the DMZ.

=== 1968 ===
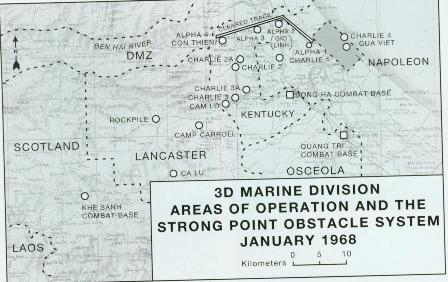
3rd Marine Division area of operations and the strongpoint obstacle system in 1968

At the beginning of 1968, the western end of the barrier region stretching from Khe Sanh Combat Base through the special forces camp at Lang Vei was attacked by PAVN forces. The special forces camp at Lang Vei was overrun and Khe Sanh was placed under siege. The initial phase of the Battle of Khe Sanh lasted for 77 days. McNamara, a major proponent of the barrier strategy, left the Defense Department on 29 February 1968. In July 1968, the new COMUSMACV General Creighton Abrams ordered Khe Sanh Combat Base to be abandoned. The base was dismantled and all the infrastructure along Route 9 toward Laos, including roads and bridges, was systematically destroyed.

On 29 October 1968, all construction work on the physical barrier along the DMZ was ceased. The physical infrastructure created for the barrier was converted into a series of strong-points and support bases for the new strategy of mobile operations. This marked the end of the McNamara Line as an operational strategy. However, the barrier concept was reduced to an aerial, sensor-based electronic interdiction program which was then continued as Operation Igloo White.

== Significance of the barrier strategy ==
In his memoirs, McNamara insisted that the barrier, or the system, as he chose to call it, was able to cut to a degree PAVN infiltration into South Vietnam. However, constructed segments turned out to be inefficient in stopping the PAVN despite being costly to build and maintain. A system of sensors to provide surveillance of the truck routes coming from Laos was a success, but its counterpart for the foot trails was never deployed. Many special munitions ordered for the barrier turned out to be ineffective or simply failed. In 1969, Defense Secretary Melvin R. Laird testified in Congress that goals set for the anti-infiltration barrier were not met despite high cost.

An official account of the Vietnam War, published in the Secretaries of Defense Historical Series, stated that the interdiction significance of the barrier remained contentious. At the same time, it reserved harsh words for McNamara's inability to listen to the opponents and called the so-called McNamara Line:

...a metaphor for the secretary's arbitrary, highly personal, and aggressive management style that bypassed normal procedures and sometimes ignored experts to get things done. He had adopted an idea from civilian academics, forced a reluctant military to implement it, opted for technology over experience, launched the project quickly and with minimum coordination, rejected informed criticism, insisted available forces sufficed for the effort, and poured millions of dollars into a system that proceeded by fits and starts.

The strategic intention of the Dye Marker plan, as well as the whole McNamara Line, was to curb the infiltration of South Vietnam by PAVN forces. This would have potentially in McNamara's opinion enabled the scaling back of the American bombing of North Vietnam and potentially created an opportunity for negotiations with Hanoi.

The defensive barrier system was also criticized at the time of its inception for keeping American troops in static positions while facing mobile enemy forces. After the Tet Offensive, the criticism intensified, and Senator Stuart Symington (D-Missouri) called the barrier a "billion dollar Maginot line concept".

== See also ==
- De Lattre Line
- Operation Igloo White
- Operation Kentucky
- Operation Buffalo (1967)
