= VO-67 =

Clandestine US Naval air squadron (1967–1968)

Observation Squadron 67
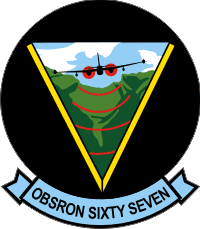
- Active: February 1967- July 1968
- Country: United States
- Branch: United States Navy
- Type: Observation? (Remains classified)
- Role: Military intelligence
- Garrison/HQ: Nakhon Phanom Royal Thai Air Force Base, Thailand
- Nickname: "Ghost Squadron" "Gandy Dancers"
- Engagements: Vietnam War

Observation Squadron 67 (VO-67) was a clandestine United States Navy military intelligence aircraft squadron based in Thailand during the Vietnam War. Created in February 1967, the unit was deactivated in July 1968. The squadron mainly flew missions over the Ho Chi Minh trail in Vietnam and Laos under the MUSCLE SHOALS mission known as Operation Igloo White, deploying electronic sensory devices from their aircraft. These sensors, known as the Air-Delivered Seismic Intrusion Detector (ADSID) and the Acoustic Seismic Intrusion Detector (ACOUSID), which would implant in the ground to detect North Vietnamese Army and Viet Cong supply movements along the trail.

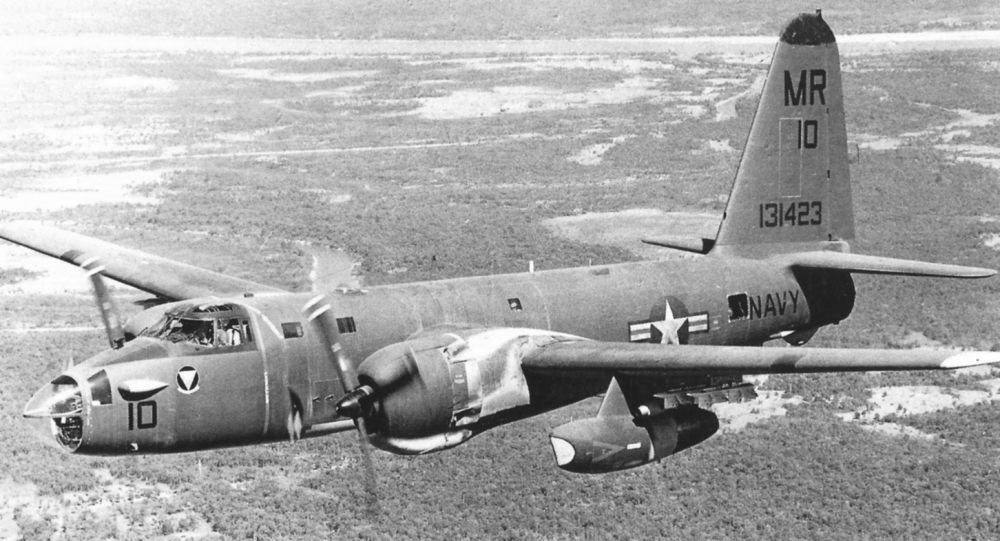
An OP-2E Neptune of VO-67, a variant of a naval patrol bomber and anti-submarine warfare (ASW) aircraft specifically developed for the Muscle Shoals mission.

The squadron flew OP-2E Neptune aircraft, a modification of the P-2E Neptune maritime patrol and antisubmarine warfare aircraft. Three unit aircraft were lost on combat missions with a total of 20 men killed. The unit received the Navy Unit Commendation and, in May 2008, was awarded the Presidential Unit Citation for its highly classified missions and for its intense aerial support of the Marines during the Battle of Khe Sanh.

The Arleigh Burke class destroyer, USS Milius (DDG-69) is named for Commander Paul L. Milius, USN, who received the Navy Cross for saving his seven-man crew while serving with VO-67. Commander Milius was lost in combat over the Ho Chi Minh Trail when his OP-2E aircraft, callsign Sophomore 50, was hit by anti-aircraft fire over Laos on 27 February 1968 and he ordered his crew to bail out. Seven of the nine men aboard were rescued. The remains of the eighth crewmember, ATN2 John Hartzheim, were identified on 19 February 1999. Although he exited his aircraft, Commander Milius was never seen again. He was listed as Missing in Action, presumed Killed in Action, and his remains never recovered.
