= Gravel mine =

US air-dropped anti-personnel land mines

Gravel mines, also called button mines, are small American-made air-dropped anti-personnel mines. They were used extensively during the Vietnam War as part of the McNamara Line. They were also used as a rapid-deployment area denial expedient, to provide a barrier during combat search and rescue (CSAR) operations between downed pilots or other endangered units and infantry threats.

== General information ==
=== Components ===
The mines consisted of a small green or brown camouflage fabric pouch filled with lead(II) azide and 30 grams of coarse ground glass between two sheets of plastic. No fuse was required because the explosive became shock-sensitive after dispersal, i.e. able to be detonated without a fuse on contact. The explosive lumps came in wedge or cubed shapes and their plasticizers evaporated after three to eight minutes exposure to air. To allow them to be handled and dropped from the air, the mines were phlegmatized with Freon 113, in which they were stored soaked. Once released from their container, the Freon would evaporate in between 3 and 8 minutes, thereby arming the mines. The mines varied in size, from simple warning bomblets (Button mines), whose detonation was to be picked up by air dropped acoustic sensors and relayed to a central control center, through to larger mines, while not powerful enough to kill a person outright, they were capable of wounding anyone stepping on it. The larger mines were fitted with a two tablet chemical system to gradually render the explosive inert, although the reliability of this mechanism was never gauged accurately.

=== Usage ===
The mines were also used by the U.S. during the Battle of Khe Sanh; however, a U.S. Air Force history described them as being "little more than a nuisance," due to the Viet Cong clearing the gravel mine fields by using teams of oxen that dragged logs over them and to the mines themselves becoming inert after a short time.

=== Manufacture ===
A total of 37 million gravel mines were produced between 1967 and 1968, though mines were produced into 1970.

== Specifications ==
The mines were typically deployed from SUU-41A/A and SUU-41B/A dispensers, with the dispensers packed into cluster bomb units with between 12 and 16 dispensers in each cluster bomb. A single bomb could contain between 1,470 and 7,500 mines. The bombs could be dropped from aircraft at between 60 and 6000 meters and at speeds of 370 km/h to 1300 km/h. The dispensers would burst at an altitude of between 200 and 300 meters, scattering the mines.

Name	Shape and size	Explosive content	Type	Notes
XM22	Quadrant, radius 64 mm	11.6 g of RDX/Lead azide	Explosive	
XM27	Quadrant, radius 83 mm	27.7 g of RDX/Lead azide	Explosive	
XM40E5	Rectangle 45 by 32 mm by 10 mm	0.54 g of Chlorate/Phosphorus based explosive	Illumination / Warning	"Wet" weight 6 g.
XM41	Quadrant, radius 89 mm	16.3 g of RDX/Lead azide	Explosive	
XM41E1	Square, 70 to 77 mm	9.4 g of RDX/Lead azide	Explosive	
XM44	Square, 25 mm	T77 or XM114 electrical detonator	Warning	
XM45E1	Rectangle, 45 by 32 mm	0.7 g of RDX/Lead azide	Explosive	
XM65	Rectangle 76 by 70 mm	10.3 g of RDX/Lead azide	Explosive	

== Dispenser configurations ==
- SUU-41A/A
  - 150 × XM41E1 per dispenser (10 dispensers per CBU)
  - 750 × XM40E5 per dispenser (10 dispensers per CBU)
  - 650 × XM40E5 and 48x XM44 per dispenser (10 dispensers per CBU)
- SUU-41B/A
  - 150 × XM65 per dispenser (10 dispensers per CBU)

== See also ==
- Cluster bomb
