= Flatley =

Flatley is an Irish surname. Its original form is Ó Flaitile. Notable people with the surname include:

- Bert Flatley (1919–1987), English soccer player and manager
- Elton Flatley (born 1977), Australian rugby union player
- Jack Flatley (born 1994), English professional boxer
- James H. Flatley (1906–1958), American vice admiral, naval aviator and tactician
- James H. Flatley III (1934–2025), a rear admiral in the United States Navy
- Michael Flatley (born 1958), American step dancer, writer, flautist and choreographer
- Norah Flatley, American gymnast
- Patricia Flatley Brennan, American nurse and academic
- Patrick Flatley (born 1963), Canadian ice hockey player
- Paul Flatley (1941–2025), American NFL player
- Stavros Flatley, finalist on Britain's Got Talent (series 3)
- Thomas Flatley (died 2008), Irish-American real estate tycoon and philanthropist

== See also ==
- USS Flatley (FFG-21), Oliver Hazard Perry-class guided-missile frigate, named after Vice Admiral James H. Flatley
