= James Flatley =

James Flatley may refer to:

- James H. Flatley (1906–1958), United States Navy aviator and tactician
- James H. Flatley III, his son, United States Navy admiral
