= William R. Kane =

United States Navy captain and pilot (1911–1957)

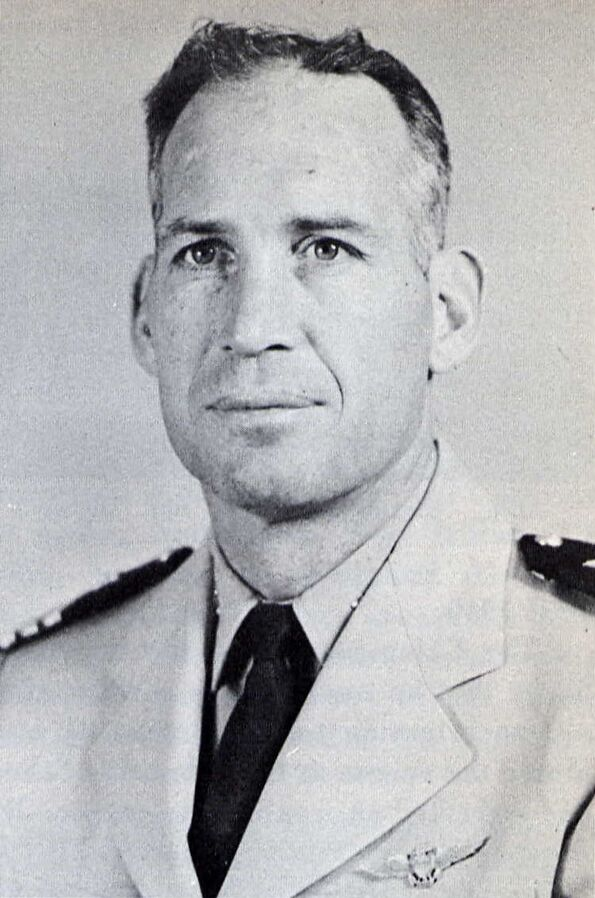
- Nickname: "Killer"
- Born: 4 June 1911; San Rafael, California
- Died: 5 February 1957 (aged 45) Near Augusta, Georgia
- Buried: Arlington National Cemetery
- Allegiance: United States
- Service: United States Navy
- Service years: 1929–1957
- Rank: Captain
- Commands: USS Saipan (CVL-48); Air Group 10; VF-10
- Battles: Battle of the Santa Cruz Islands; Battle of Rennell Island; Battle of the Philippine Sea
- Awards: Navy Cross; Distinguished Flying Cross (2)

William Richard "Killer" Kane (4 June 1911 – 5 February 1957) was a United States Navy captain and World War II flying ace.

A 1932 graduate of the United States Naval Academy and standout athlete there, Kane served aboard ships of the Pacific Fleet before becoming a naval aviator. During World War II, Kane participated in multiple carrier battles, including the Battle of the Santa Cruz Islands and the Battle of the Philippine Sea. He become a flying ace with six aerial victories and commanded Fighting Squadron 10 (VF-10) and the USS Enterprise air group. Postwar, Kane served in a succession of staff assignments and graduated from the Air and Naval War Colleges. He became captain of the light carrier Saipan in 1956, but was killed less than a year later when the training aircraft he was flying crashed on a routine training flight.

== Early life and prewar service ==
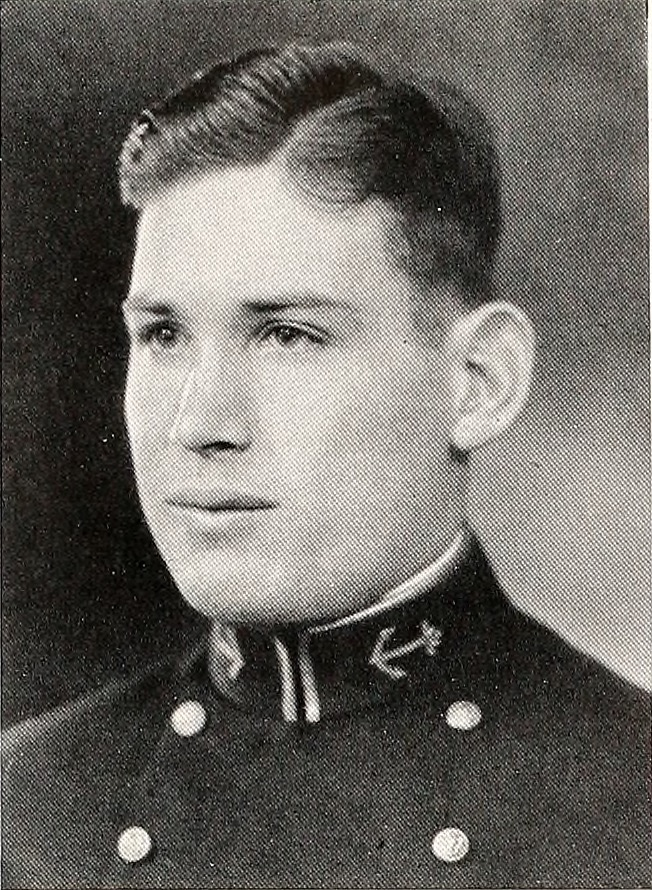
Senior yearbook portrait of Kane

William Richard Kane was born on 4 June 1911 in the small town of San Rafael, California, the only son out of the three children of Sabin David and Ada Kane. His grandfather served as a fireman and policeman while his father was bandmaster of the San Rafael Military Academy and later became police chief. Kane grew up in San Rafael and attended the San Rafael Military Academy before transferring to San Rafael High School in sophomore year of high school, from which he graduated with five letters for baseball, basketball, swimming, football, and track.

Appointed to the United States Naval Academy Class of 1933, Kane entered the academy in June 1929. A boxer, wrestler, football tackle, baseball pitcher, and javelin throw competitor, Kane, nicknamed Killer for his athleticism, received the Navy Athletic Association Sword, presented to the graduate judged to be the best all-around athlete. In the football team's shutout loss in the 1932 Army–Navy Game, Kane garnered praise for his defensive performance at right tackle. Graduating 195th out of a class of 435, Kane was commissioned as an ensign. He served aboard the battleship New York between June 1933 and April 1934, then the heavy cruiser Astoria. While stationed aboard New York, homeported at Bremerton, Kane met local journalist Madeline Munns, whom he married on 14 June 1935.

After his marriage, he left for flight training at Naval Air Station Pensacola. Having completed his training and been designated a naval aviator in August 1936, Kane shipped out for Bombing Squadron 5 (VB-5B) aboard the carrier Lexington. Transferred to Fighting Squadron 2 (VF-2) on the same ship in June 1937, he returned to the Naval Academy on temporary duty as a physical training instructor and assistant football coach for the season between July and December 1938. After serving as a floatplane pilot aboard the heavy cruiser Wichita from January 1939, Kane arrived at Naval Air Station Pearl Harbor in July 1940 to serve as a flight test officer there.

== World War II ==
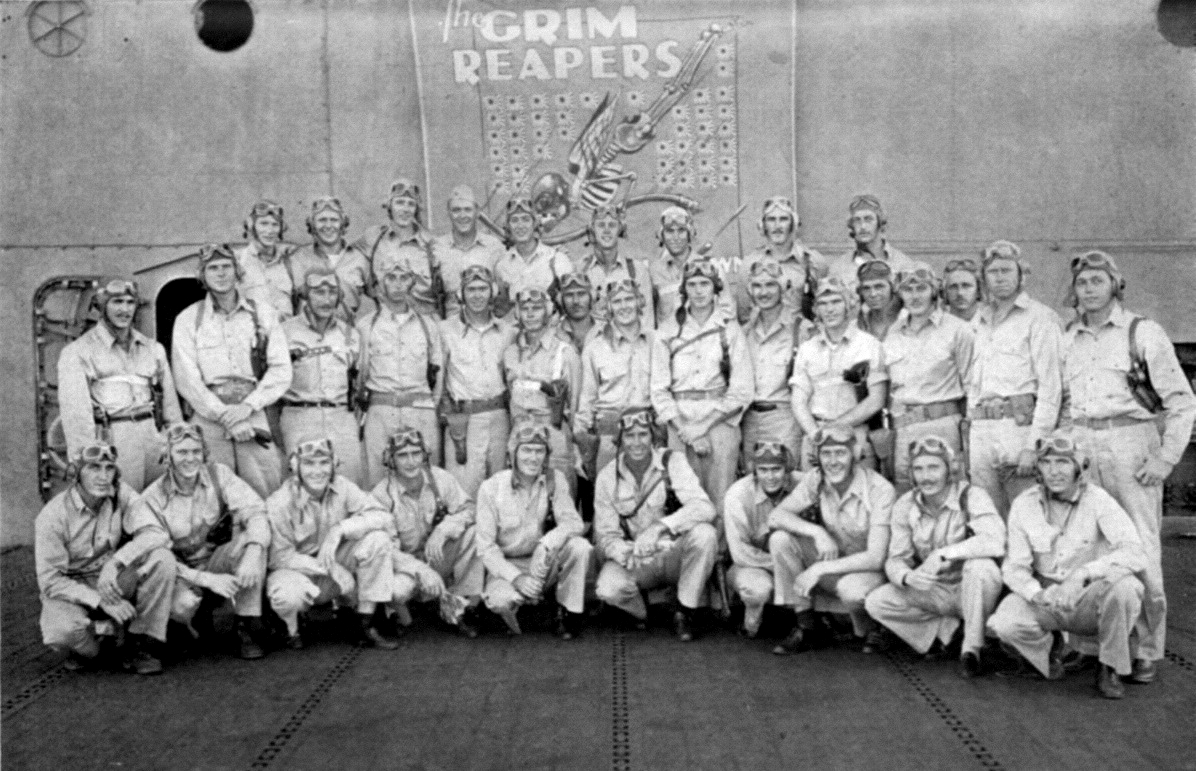
VF-10 pilots aboard Enterprise during the Guadalcanal Campaign. Kane is in the front row on knee, 5th from right.

Kane was officer of the day at the naval air station during the 7 December 1941 Attack on Pearl Harbor, and remained on duty for the next two days supervising damage control. Eager to escape duty at Pearl Harbor, he became executive officer of Fighting Squadron 10 (VF-10), nicknamed the Grim Reapers, on 8 October 1942. VF-10, commanded by Lieutenant Commander James H. Flatley and equipped with F4F-4 Wildcat fighters, soon embarked aboard the carrier Enterprise.

The Enterprise and its air group participated in the Battle of the Santa Cruz Islands, which began on 25 October. Shortly after 14:00 on 25 October, Kane launched leading the fighter escort for a strike led by Bombing Squadron 10 (VB-10) commanding officer Lieutenant Commander James Thomas. After three Wildcats failed to join up with the strike group, Kane was left with his flight consisting of Lieutenants Frederick L. Faulkner and Frank Don Miller as well as Ensign Maurice N. Wickendoll, and Lieutenant Swede Vejtasa's flight of four. As the Japanese they sought were withdrawing to the north, the strike group could not catch them and spent several hours fruitlessly searching. Low on fuel, they turned back towards Enterprise by nightfall; Faulkner determined the correct course but none of the others followed him. Miller ran out of fuel and ditched at 18:14, before Vejtasa found the carrier sometime after 18:30. The remaining VF-10 pilots were able to make safe landings.

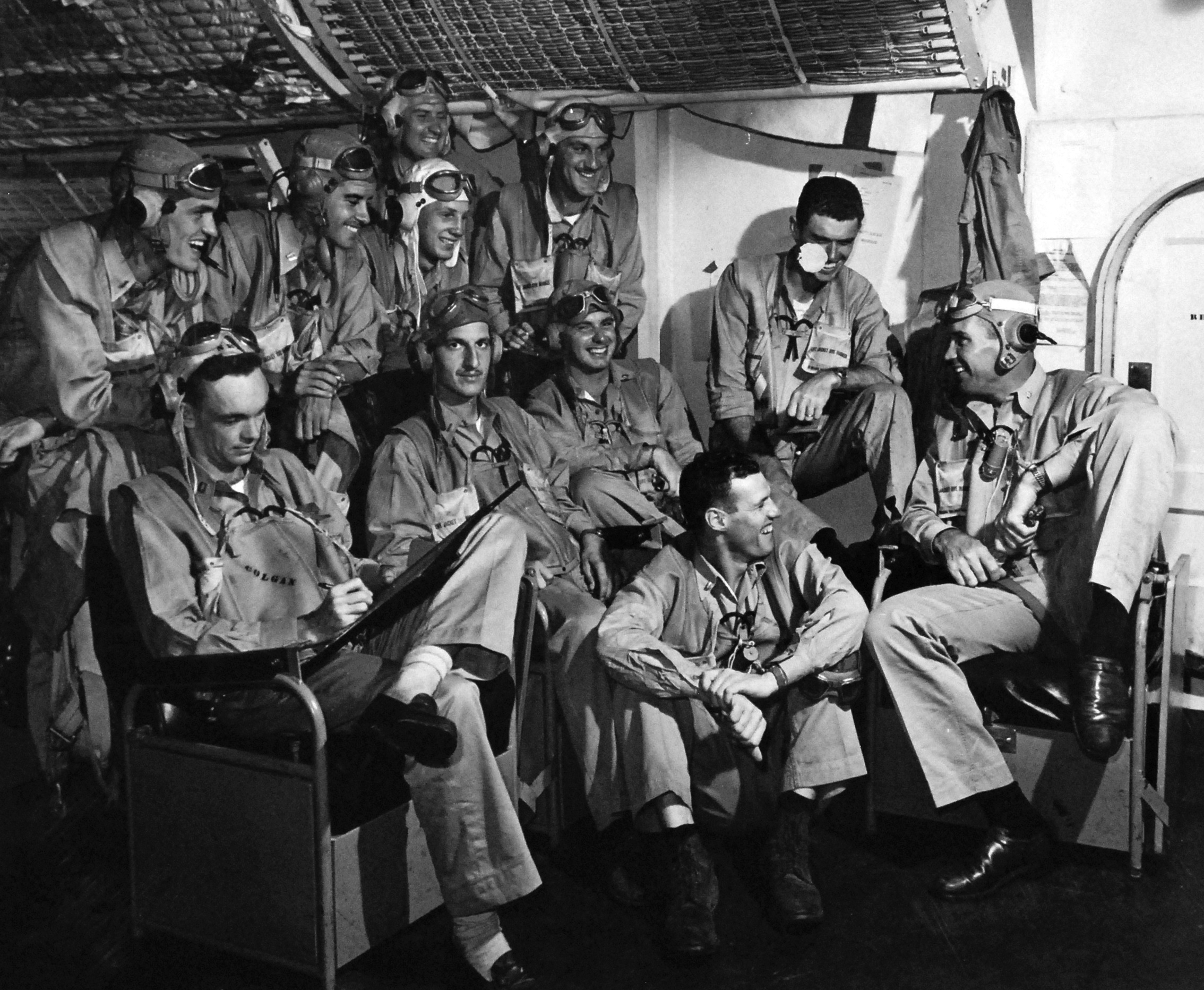
Kane (seated on far right) with VF-10 pilots, c. February 1944

After the heavy cruiser Chicago was disabled by Japanese torpedo bombers on 29 January 1943 in the Battle of Rennell Island, Kane took off at 13:40 on the next day leading a division that included five others on combat air patrol to cover the cruiser, which was under tow. When a G4M Betty was spotted shortly after 16:00, he sent four pilots after the intruder, which was downed by Ensigns William H. Leder and Wickendoll. After this was dealt with, Kane's division headed for the Enterprise, being replaced by that of Lieutenant Macgregor Kilpatrick. The Chicago was sunk shortly afterwards by raid of twelve Bettys, although the patrolling Wildcats shot down eight.

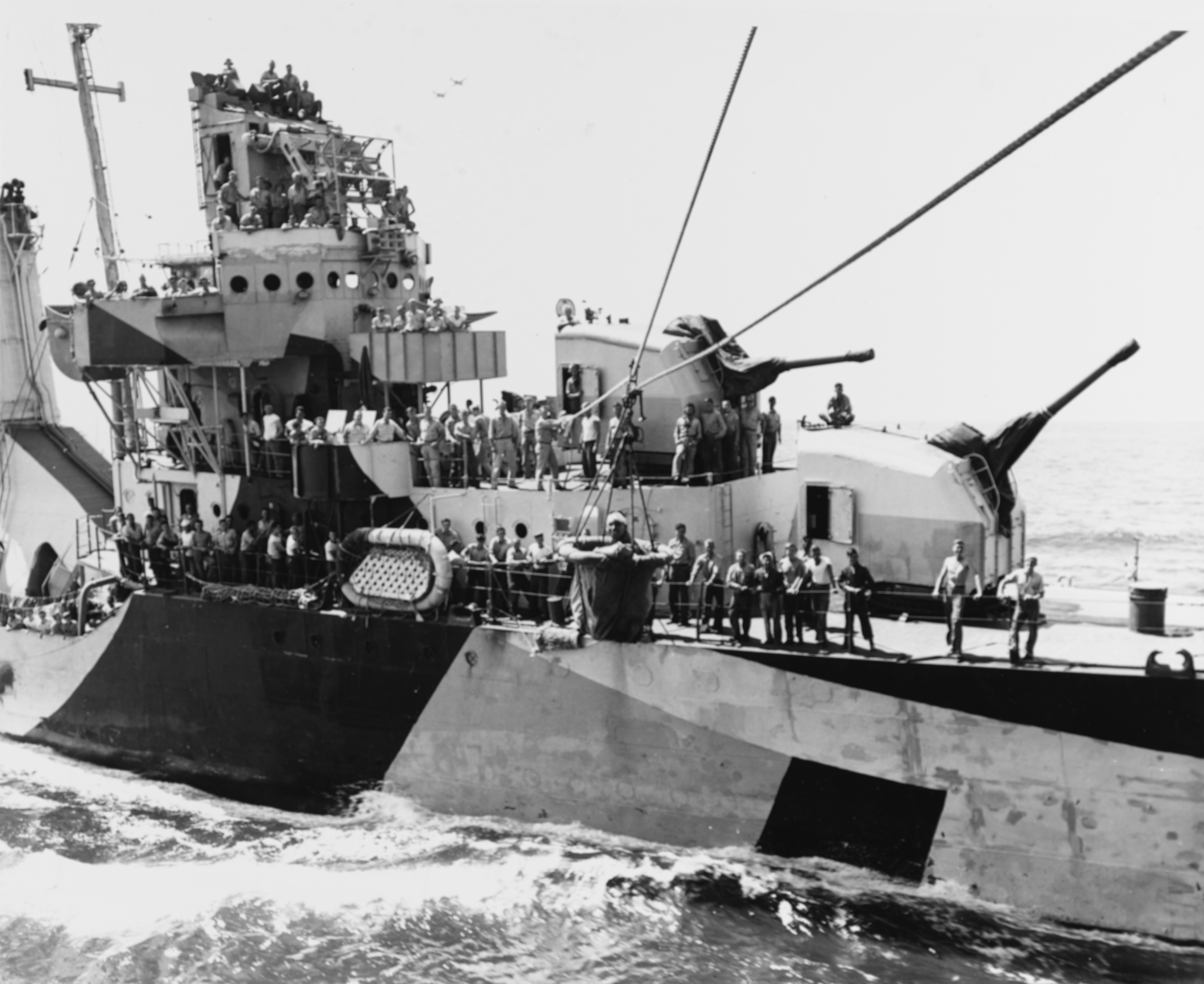
Kane being returned to Enterprise from Patterson by breeches buoy, 16 June 1944

Kane subsequently became commanding officer of VF-10 after Flatley returned to the United States in February 1943, following the end of the Guadalcanal campaign. The rest of 1943 proved relatively uneventful for the Enterprise air group, as the carrier returned to Pearl Harbor, returning to action towards the end of the year. Between 29 January and 4 February 1944 Enterprise launched strikes against Japanese forces on Taroa and Kwajalein in support of the amphibious landing in the Battle of Kwajalein. During the strikes against Taroa, Kane overcame poor weather conditions in leading the fighters to the island, where they destroyed numerous aircraft on the ground. Over Kwajalein Kane "effectively led numerous strikes" that destroyed an ammunition dump. Determined to keep a flying role, Kane refused a promotion to Enterprise air officer and instead became commander of the Enterprise Air Group shortly before the Operation Hailstone airstrikes against the Japanese base on Truk Island between 17 and 18 February. On the first day of the strikes, Kane led the first fighter sweep over the island, downing three Japanese Zeroes and then strafing parked aircraft. For directing his fighters "skillfully and coolly against enemy air opposition," and his leadership during the earlier Taroa and Kwajalein strikes, Kane was awarded the Distinguished Flying Cross. Bombing Squadron 10 (VB-10) commander James D. Ramage praised Kane for his leadership: "Killer was just great...he ran things very low-key but competently," as well as his radio discipline. Kane was also known for his nearsightedness but applied his "forceful personality" to remain on flight status. The Enterprise continued to launch strikes against Japanese forces in the Marshall and Caroline Islands and supported the Hollandia landing, between 20 February and 30 April. During strikes against Palau and Truk, Kane was credited with assisting in the downing of two Japanese aircraft. For his "skillful" leadership during these operations, Kane received a Gold Star to his Distinguished Flying Cross.

Kane saw significant action during Operation Forager, beginning with airstrikes in support of the landing on Saipan. Leading the fighters into action again on 11 June, he was credited with downing a Japanese aircraft and a probable kill. While acting as coordinator of the first strike against Saipan before dawn on 16 June, Kane's Hellcat was hit by friendly fire from amphibious craft and he was forced to ditch. Although he suffered a head injury in the crash, he was quickly picked up, but was taken off flight status temporarily, missing much of 19 June, the first day of the Battle of the Philippine Sea. Kane overruled the flight surgeon later that day and escorted TBF Avengers on a search mission, during which he shot down two floatplanes to gain flying ace status, bringing his total for the war to six aerial victories. On the next day, Kane led the air group in strikes against the Japanese carriers, with his fighters "reducing the air opposition" and conducting strafing runs that helped to sink the carrier Hiyō. Having spent ten hours in the air, Kane was unable to land on a carrier in the darkness that night, and flew into the sea. He was picked up by a destroyer and returned to the Enterprise on 22 June. In recognition of his performance during the battle, Kane was awarded the Navy Cross, the branch's second highest award.

After his combat tour ended, Kane succeeded Frank Wickhorst as head of the physical training program of the Naval Pre-Flight Schools, which placed a heavy emphasis on football as preparation for future pilots. Praising the program with examples from his combat service, Kane viewed football as teaching teamwork and discipline analogous to formation flying. He advocated for universal men's competitive athletics in the education system in order to ensure good physical condition, linking flying ability with the latter.

== Postwar ==
After the end of the war, Kane returned to the Naval Academy in December 1945 as executive officer of the Department of Physical Training and later became assistant director of Athletics there. After a stint as operations and air officer aboard the carrier Tarawa between January 1948 and June 1949, Kane graduated from the Air War College in June 1950. A return to the Pentagon to serve on the staff of the Deputy Chief of Naval Operations for Air followed and in February 1952 he became chief of staff of Heavy Attack Wing 1. Promoted to the rank of captain on 1 July 1952, Kane served on the staff of the Commander in Chief of the Atlantic Fleet between January 1953 and July 1954. After graduating from the Naval War College, he served on the staff of the commander of the Air Force of the Atlantic Fleet from June 1955.

Kane became captain of the light carrier Saipan in July 1956. Returning to the base of his carrier at Naval Air Station Pensacola from Naval Station Norfolk, Kane was killed on 5 February 1957 when his TV-2 Shooting Star trainer crashed on a dairy farm near Augusta, Georgia after experiencing a complete electrical failure. His co-pilot, the Saipan executive officer, was injured in the crash. Buried at the Arlington National Cemetery, Kane was survived by his wife, a son, and two daughters. His wife remarried several years later and died in 2006, being interred beside Kane at Arlington National Cemetery.

== Awards and decorations ==
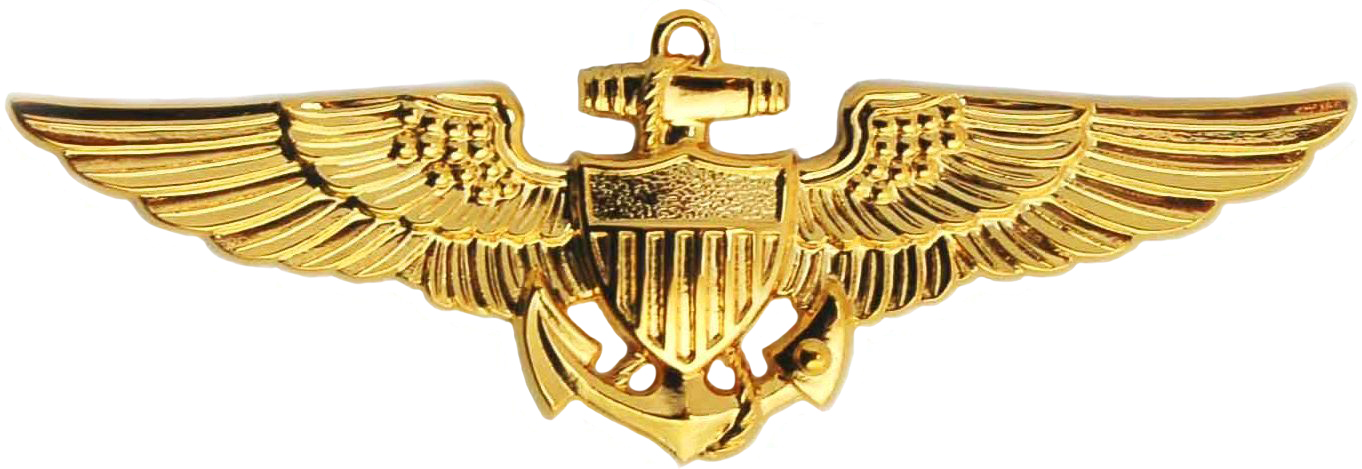

Naval Aviator Badge
Navy Cross		Distinguished Flying Cross w/ 5/16" Gold Star
Navy Commendation Medal	Navy Presidential Unit Citation w/ two 3/16" Bronze Stars	Navy Unit Commendation
China Service Medal w/ 3/16" Bronze Star	American Defense Service Medal w/ Fleet clasp	American Campaign Medal
Asiatic-Pacific Campaign Medal w/ two 3/16" Silver Stars and two 3/16" Bronze Stars	World War II Victory Medal	National Defense Service Medal

=== Navy Cross citation ===

Commander William Richard Kane
U.S. Navy
Date Of Action: June 11, 1944 to June 25, 1944

The President of the United States of America takes pleasure in presenting the Navy Cross to Commander William Richard Kane, United States Navy, for extraordinary heroism in operations against the enemy while serving as Pilot of a carrier-based Navy Fighter Plane and Commander of Air Group TEN (AG-10), attached to the USS Enterprise (CV-6), in action from 11 to 25 June 1944, in action against enemy Japanese forces in the vicinity of the Southern Mariana Islands, from 11 to 25 June 1944. Courageously leading his Air Group on numerous attacks, including fighter sweeps and bombardment missions, against strong enemy installations, Commander Kane inflicted serious and costly damage on enemy airfields, gun emplacements and beach positions, personally destroying one enemy fighter in aerial combat and damaging another. Despite a painful wound incurred when shot down on 16 June, he participated in the First Battle of the Philippine Sea on 20 June, serving as a fighter escort for several planes seeking the location of the main Japanese Fleet and shooting down a single-engined torpedo plane and a twin float aero-reconnaissance plane. Conducting a coordinated strike against the Japanese Fleet, he shot down an intercepting enemy ZERO in the ensuing battle and, directing his fighter planes in strafing dives on the decks of an enemy carrier, reduced the anti-aircraft opposition for his dive bombers and torpedo planes during their attacks which disabled or sunk the enemy vessel. Retiring with his group through darkness to base after this strenuous and protracted engagement, he effected a forced water landing, when unable to land on his carrier. By his brilliant airmanship, courageous initiative and daring leadership, Commander Kane contributed materially to the success of our operations in these historic actions, and his great personal valor in the face of grave peril was in keeping with the highest traditions of the United States Naval Service.
