= Featley =

Featley is a surname. Notable people with the surname include:

- Daniel Featley (1582–1645), English theologian and controversialist
- John Featley (1605–1666), English chorister and divine

== See also ==
- Flatley
