= VF-10 =

United States Navy aviation squadron (1942-1945)

Fighting Squadron 10
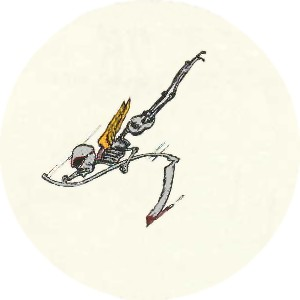
- VF-10 Insignia
- Active: 3 June 1942 – 26 November 1945
- Country: United States
- Branch: US Navy
- Type: Fighter Squadron
- Nickname: Grim Reapers
- Equipment: F4F Wildcat, F6F Hellcat, F4U Corsair
- Engagements: World War II

Fighting Squadron 10 (VF-10), also known as the "Grim Reapers", was an aviation unit of the United States Navy, established on 3 June 1942 and disestablished on 26 November 1945.

== Operational history ==
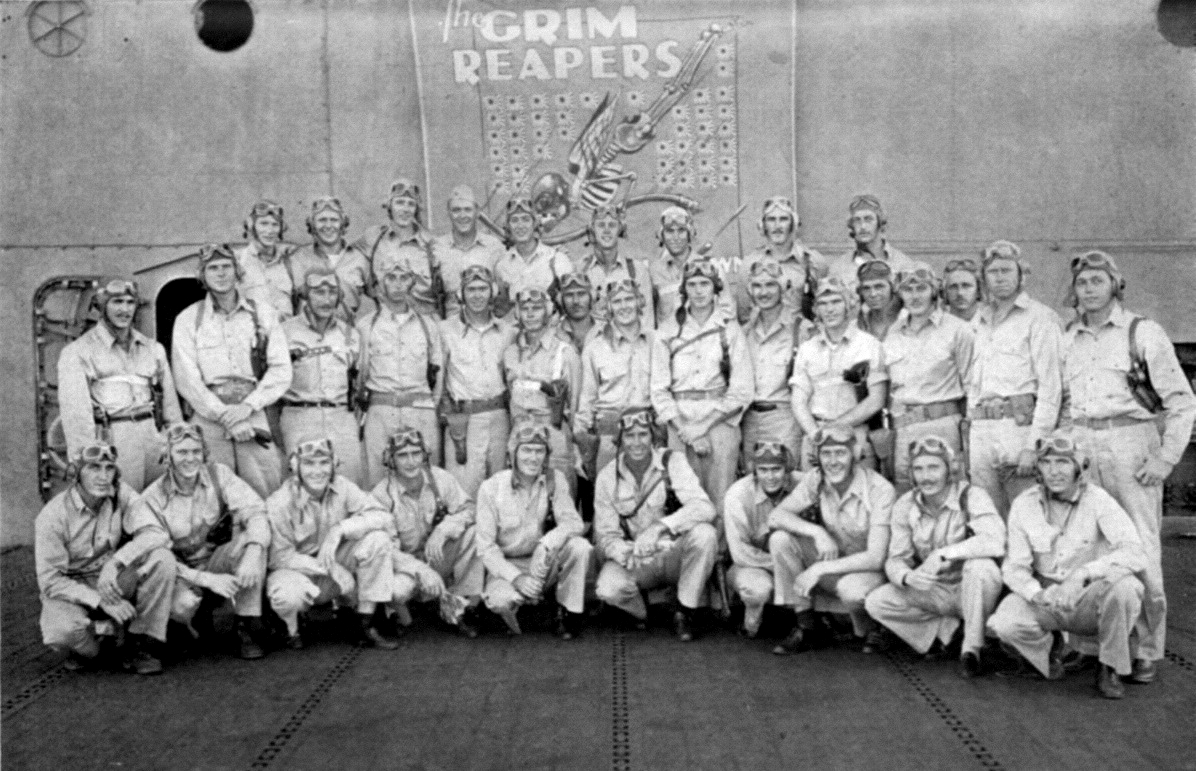
VF-10 pilots on USS Enterprise during the Guadalcanal Campaign (2nd Commander of VF-10 William R. "Killer" Kane (8 kills) in front row on knee, 5th from right).

VF-10 was established at NAS San Diego flying the Grumman F4F Wildcat. The first commanding officer was James H. Flatley fresh from the Battle of the Coral Sea. The Grim Reapers deployed with USS Enterprise to the Southern Pacific in October 1942 where they participated in the Battle of Guadalcanal. As part of that campaign, the Grim Reapers played a pivotal role in defending the Enterprise and its task force during the Battle of Santa Cruz Islands from 25-27 October 1942. After their return to the U.S. and NAS Sand Point they transitioned to the Grumman F6F-3 Hellcat and once again deployed to the South Pacific aboard Enterprise. During their second combat tour, VF-10 participated in operations in the Marshall Islands, Jaluit, Emirau, Western Caroline Islands, Hollandia, Truk Lagoon and the Battle of the Philippine Sea (Marianas Turkey Shoot).

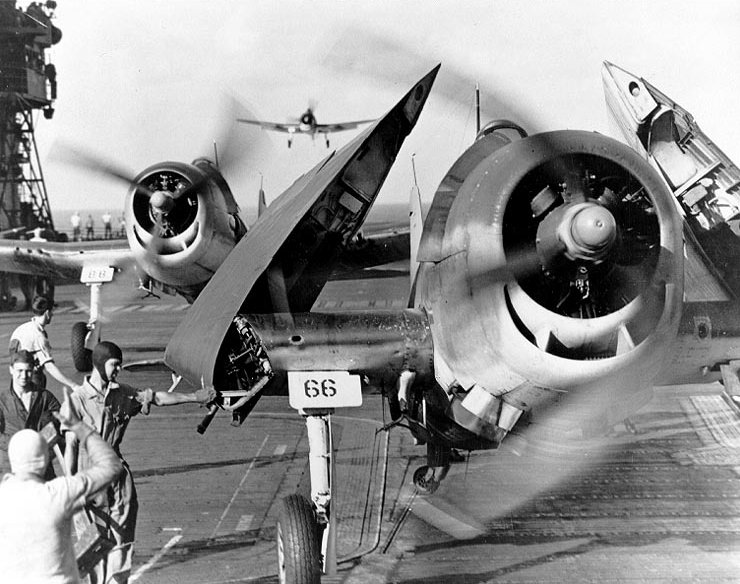
VF-10 Grumman F6F Hellcats returning to the USS Enterprise in 1944.

The squadron returned to the States, transitioning to the Vought F4U Corsair in January 1945 at NAS Atlantic City. VF-10 returned to the Pacific aboard USS Intrepid and took part in strikes against Ryukyu Islands, Kyūshū, Okinawa and the Wake Island. Finally, VF-10 returned to NAS Alameda where it was deactivated in November 1945.

== See also ==
- Edward L. Feightner
- Donald "Flash" Gordon
- History of the United States Navy
- Macgregor Kilpatrick
- William H. Leder
- List of inactive United States Navy aircraft squadrons
- List of United States Navy aircraft squadrons
- Swede Vejtasa
