= USS Flatley =

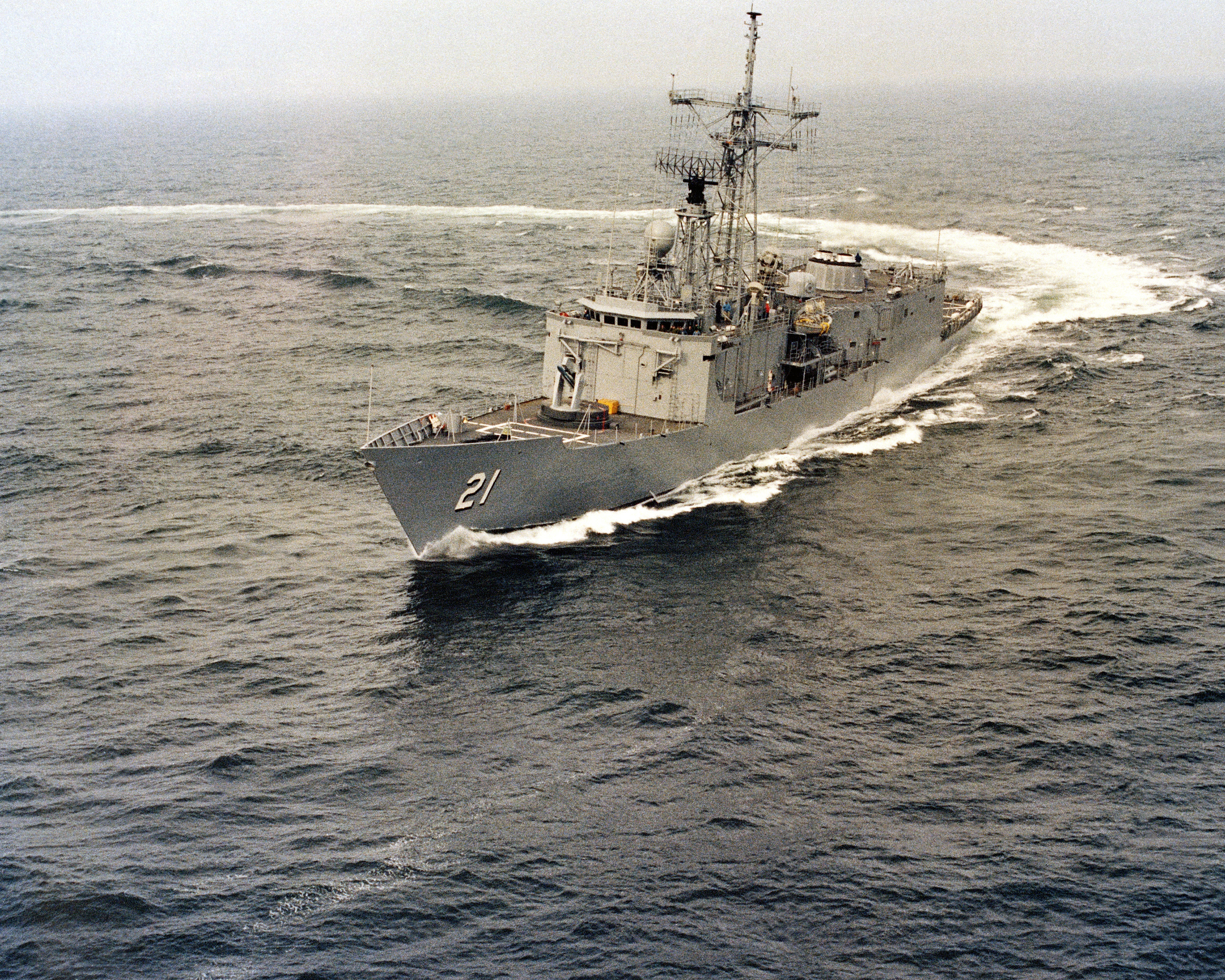
- An aerial port bow view of the Oliver Hazard Perry-class guided missile frigate USS Flatley executing a starboard turn.

History

United States
- Name: Flatley
- Namesake: Vice Admiral James H. Flatley
- Ordered: 28 February 1977
- Builder: Bath Iron Works, Bath, Maine
- Laid down: 13 November 1979
- Launched: 15 May 1980
- Sponsored by: Mrs. Dorothy M. Flatley, widow of Vice Admiral Flatley
- Acquired: 8 May 1981
- Commissioned: 20 June 1981
- Decommissioned: 11 May 1996
- Home port: Naval Station Mayport
- Identification: Hull symbol:FFG-21; Code letters:NJHF
- Motto: "Have Courage"
- Fate: Disposed of through the Security Assistance Program (SAP)
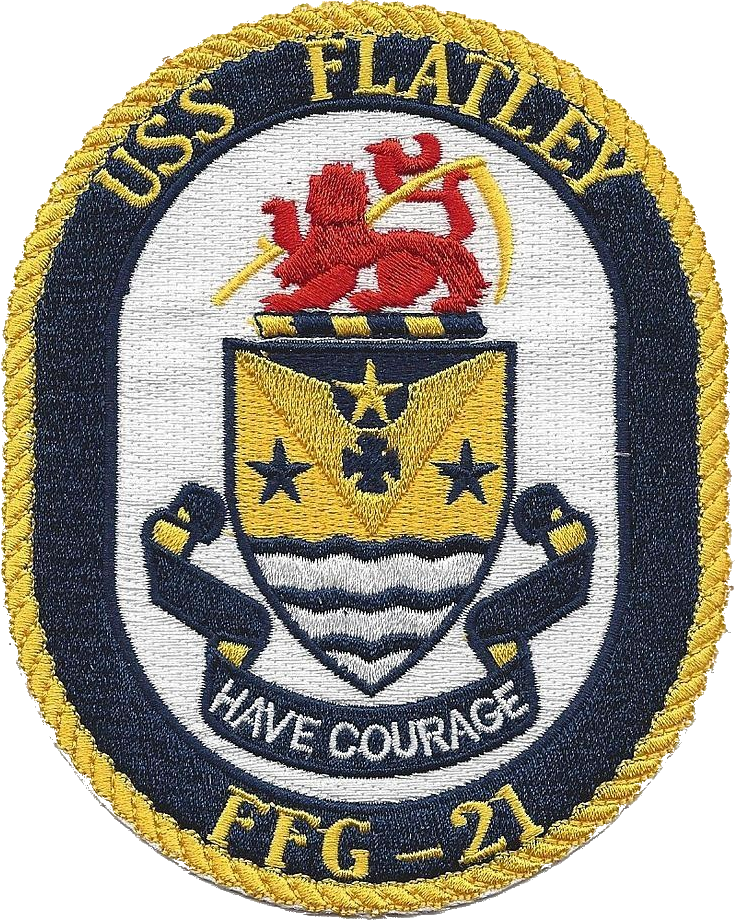
- Badge
- Stricken: 10 October 2001
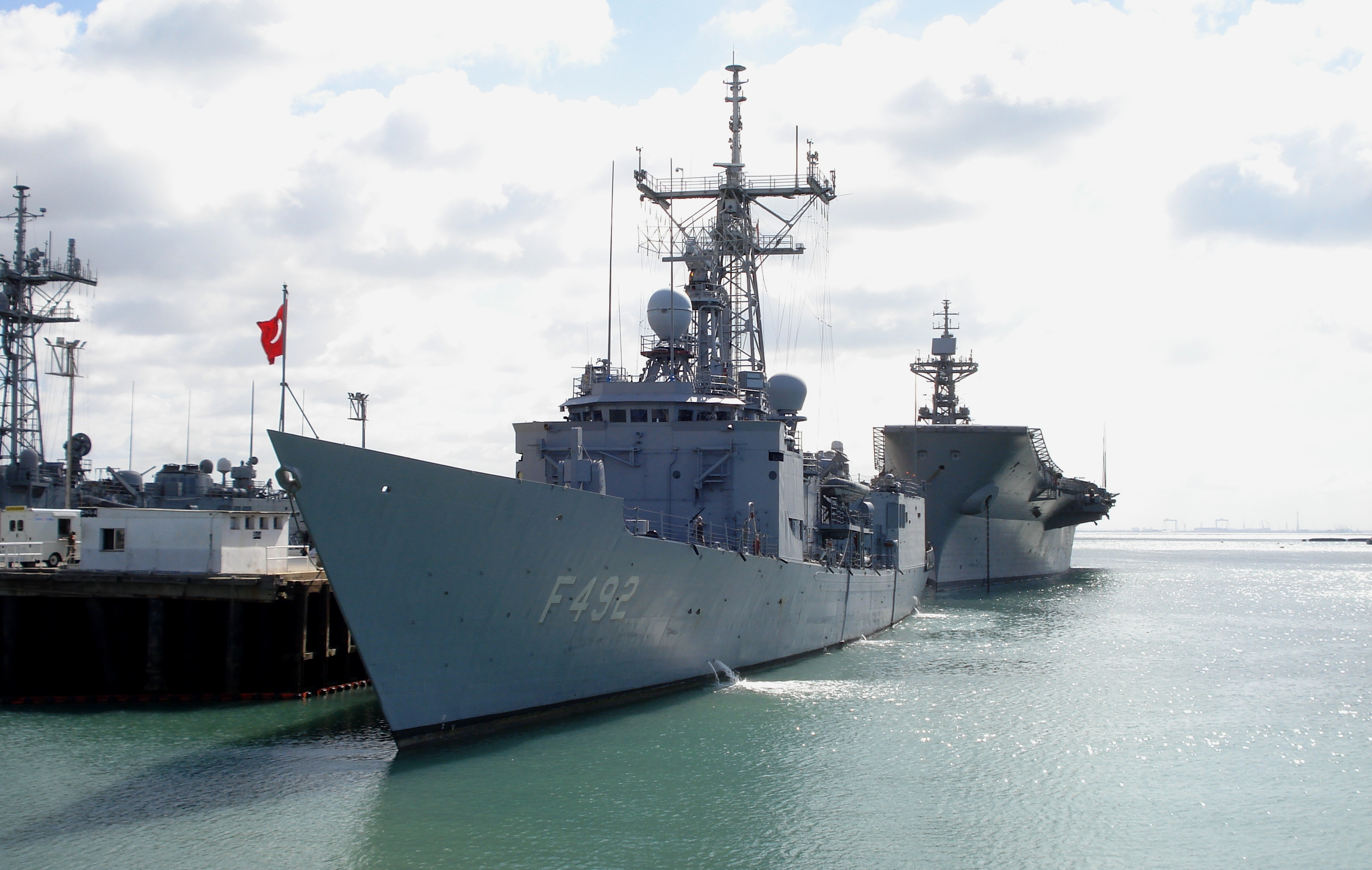
- TCG Gemlik in Rota, Cádiz.

Turkey
- Name: Gemlik
- Namesake: District of Gemlik
- Acquired: 27 August 1998
- Identification: Hull number: F 492; MMSI number: 271035034; Callsign: TBOG
- Status: in active service

General characteristics
- Class & type: Oliver Hazard Perry-class frigate
- Displacement: 4,100 long tons (4,200 t), full load
- Length: 445 feet (136 m), overall
- Beam: 45 feet (14 m)
- Draft: 22 feet (6.7 m)
- Propulsion: 2 × General Electric LM2500-30 gas turbines generating 41,000 shp (31 MW) through a single shaft and variable pitch propeller; 2 × Auxiliary Propulsion Units, 350 hp (260 kW) retractable electric azimuth thrusters for maneuvering and docking.
- Speed: over 29 knots (54 km/h)
- Range: 5,000 nautical miles at 18 knots (9,300 km at 33 km/h)
- Complement: 15 officers and 190 enlisted, plus SH-60 LAMPS detachment of roughly six officer pilots and 15 enlisted maintainers
- Sensors & processing systems: AN/SPS-49 air-search radar; AN/SPS-55 surface-search radar; CAS and STIR fire-control radar; AN/SQS-56 sonar.
- Electronic warfare & decoys: AN/SLQ-32
- Armament: As built: 1 × OTO Melara Mk 75 76 mm/62 caliber naval gun; 2 × Mk 32 triple-tube (324 mm) launchers for Mark 46 torpedoes; 1 × Vulcan Phalanx CIWS; 4 × .50-cal (12.7 mm) machine guns.; 1 × Mk 13 Mod 4 single-arm launcher for Harpoon anti-ship missiles and SM-1MR Standard anti-ship/air missiles (40 round magazine); Note: As of 2004, Mk 13 systems removed from all active US vessels of this class.; G-Class Frigate: 1 × Mk 15 Phalanx CIWS; 1 × Oto Melara 76mm DP gun; 8 × Harpoon SSM; 40 × SM-1 MR SAM; 32 × ESSM launched from Mk-41 VLS (4 ESSM missiles per MK-41 cell through the use of MK25 Quadpack canisters, total of 8 cells); Two triple Mark 32 Anti-submarine warfare torpedo tubes with Mark 46 or Mark 50 anti-submarine warfare torpedoes
- Aircraft carried: 1 × SH-2F LAMPS I

USS Flatley (FFG-21) was the thirteenth ship of the Oliver Hazard Perry class of guided-missile frigates. She was the first ship of the U.S. Navy to be named for Vice Admiral James H. Flatley (1906–1958), a leading Naval Aviation tactician from World War II who flew the Grumman F4F Wildcat in the Battle of Coral Sea and subsequently commanded the VF-10 Grim Reapers taking them into combat for the first time.

Ordered from Bath Iron Works on 28 February 1977 as part of the FY77 program, Flatley's keel was laid down on 13 November 1979. She was launched on 15 May 1980, and commissioned on 20 June 1981. Decommissioned on 11 May 1996, she was sold to Turkey on 27 August 1998.

== TCG Gemlik (F 492) ==
The ship immediately underwent conversion into a Turkish G-class frigate. She serves in the Turkish Navy as TCG Gemlik (F 492).
