= William H. Leder =

U.S. Navy pilot and Air Medal recipient

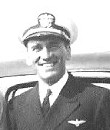
- Born: May 5, 1918; Flasher, North Dakota, US
- Died: September 5, 1943 (aged 25); Ellensburg, Washington, US
- Burial place: Evergreen Washelli Memorial Park
- Military career
- Allegiance: United States of America
- Branch: United States Navy
- Service years: 1941–1943
- Rank: Lieutenant (j.g.)
- Unit: Grim Reapers 10
- Conflicts: World War II Battle of Santa Cruz Islands
- Awards: Air Medal

William Henry Leder (May 5, 1918 – September 5, 1943) was a fighter pilot with the United States Naval Reserve (USNR) during World War II. He is credited with scoring multiple victories during the conflict flying a Grumman F4F Wildcat. For actions during the Battle of Santa Cruz Islands he was awarded the Air Medal.

== Early life ==
Leder was born in Flasher, North Dakota, in 1918, the son of Helena Augusta Wall and Carl Benjamin Leder. He attended Mandan High School in Mandan, North Dakota. After high school, he attended North Dakota State Teachers College and graduated with a B.A. Degree. He taught in public schools in North Dakota for two years before enlisting. He enlisted in the Navy on April 12, 1941.

== World War II ==
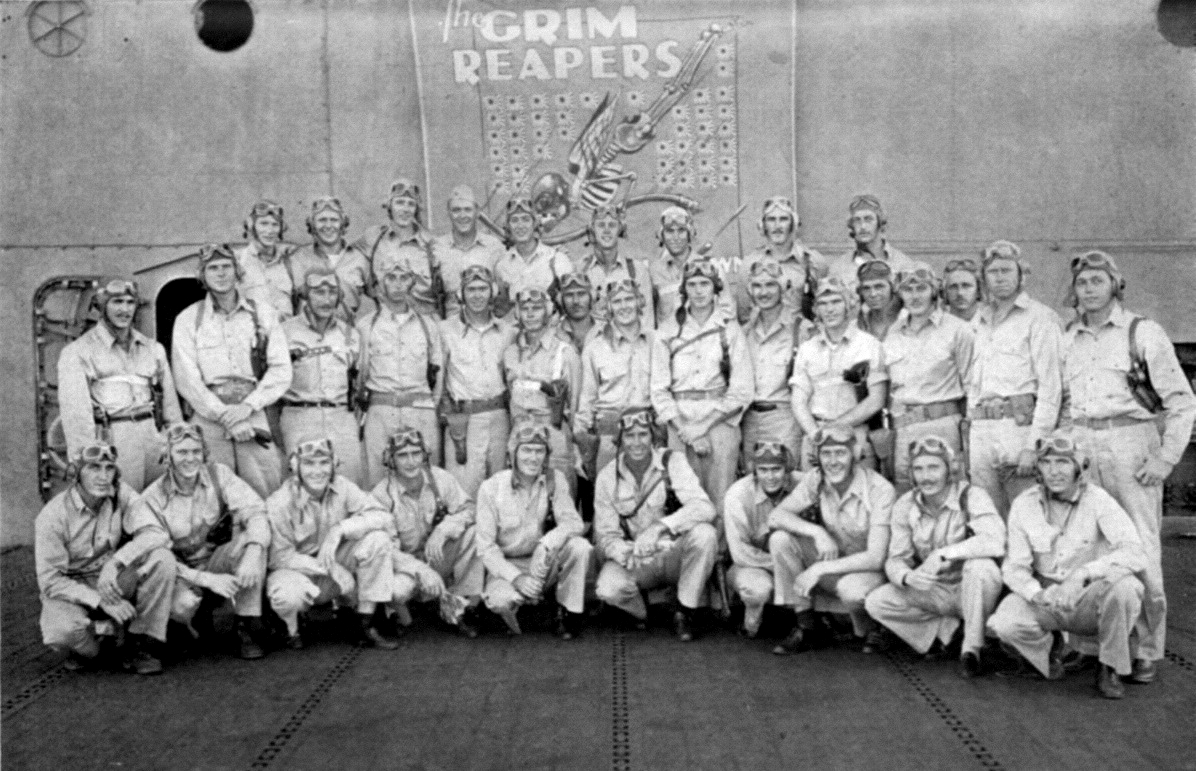
VF-10 pilots on USS Enterprise during the Guadalcanal Campaign (William H. Leder in front row on knee, far left).

Leder was initially stationed at the Naval Reserve Aviation Base in Minneapolis, Minnesota. He became an aviation cadet on October 1, 1941, and attended flight training at Naval Air Station Pensacola. He was commissioned an ensign on May 15, 1942. On May 18 of that same year, he married Kathryn Sylvia Loran before being transferred to Aircraft Carrier Training Group NAS San Diego in June.

In August 1942, he joined Fighting Squadron 10 (VF-10) before being shipped out to the Pacific Theater.

Leder flew as a member of what was known as the Cactus Air Force. He was part of a large assembly of allied air power assigned to the Solomon Islands in support of the Guadalcanal campaign. He was stationed on the USS Enterprise during the Battle of Santa Cruz Islands and flew multiple air combat patrol missions in defense of his carrier group against enemy Japanese forces.

In his first air combat engagement on October 26, 1942, he shot down at least one enemy dive bomber in defense of the Enterprise.

On November 13, 1942, he was part of a four plane flight on combat patrol over the Enterprise that intercepted and shot down a Japanese bomber shadowing the task force.

Later on January 30, 1943, he shot down a torpedo bomber attempting to attack the cruiser USS Chicago as it sat damaged near Rennell Island.

== Air Medal ==
Leder was nominated by his commander for the Distinguished Flying Cross and was ultimately awarded the Air Medal for his actions in the Pacific.

Citation:

Conspicuous courage and skill in air combat with the enemy. On October 26, 1942, while defending your carrier from air attack in the Battle of Santa Cruz Islands, you destroyed one enemy dive bomber and probably destroyed another before they could release their bombs. In November 13, 1942, while a member of the combat patrol over the U.S.S. ENTERPRISE, you assisted in shooting down one four engine patrol bomber which was attempting to shadow your task force. On January 30, 1943, while on combat patrol over the damaged cruiser USS CHICAGO in the vicinity of Rennell Island, yourself and three other pilots intercepted, by sight contact, an enemy heavily armed twin engine torpedo bomber which was preceding an enemy attack group of twelve torpedo bombers for the obvious purpose of reconnoitering our forces and directing the attack. After a running fight lasting twenty minutes and carried on at speeds approaching 300 m.p.h., you succeeded in shooting the enemy down in flames. Your courage, tenacity, and skill were exemplary and were in keeping with the highest traditions of the U.S. Naval Service.

== Later career and death ==
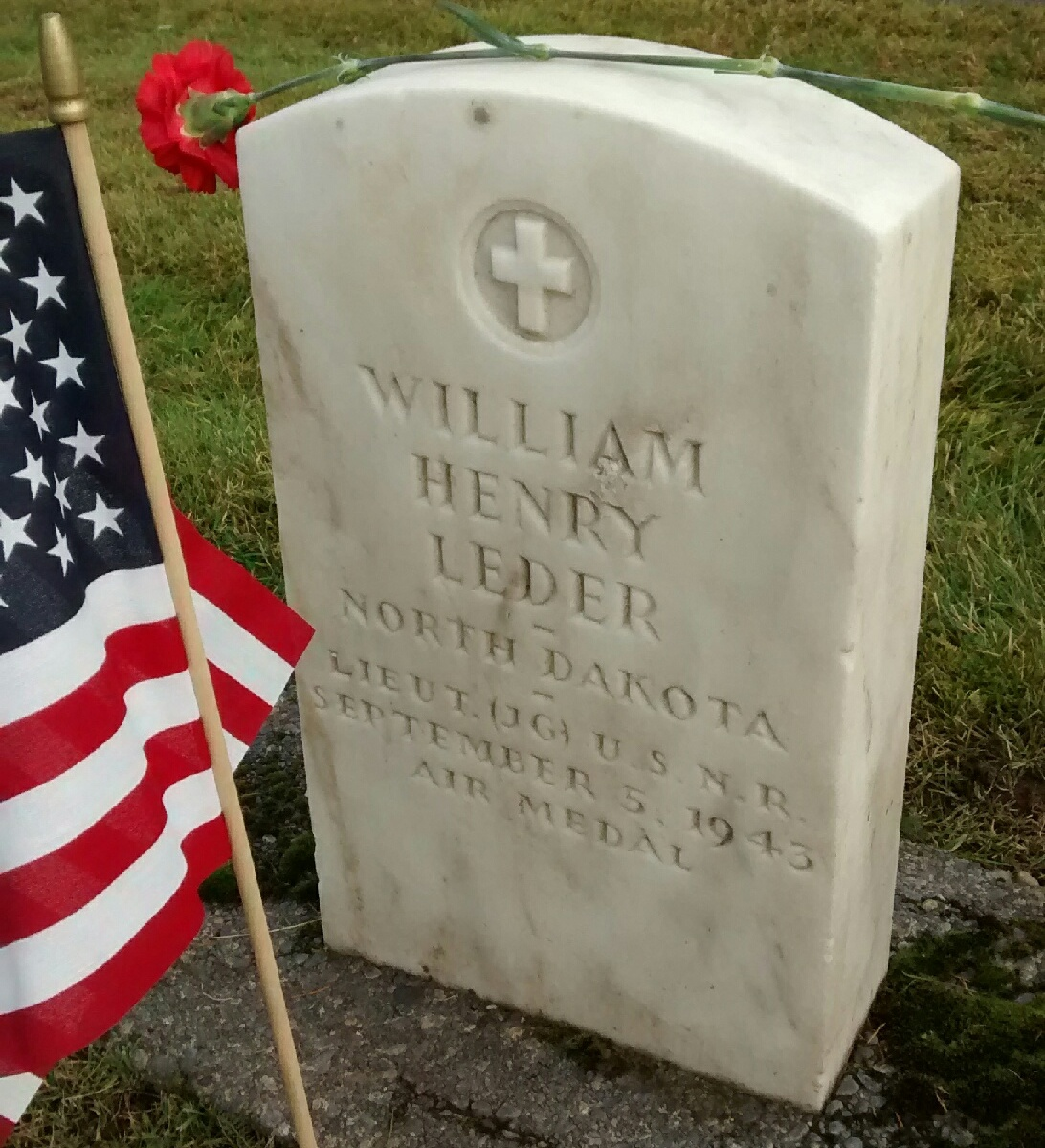
Memorial headstone at Evergreen Washelli Memorial Park.

After action in the Pacific, Leder moved to Woodinville, Washington, and was stationed at the Ellensburg Army Airfield (today Bowers Field) in Ellensburg, Washington, as a test pilot. On September 5, 1943, the Navy plane he was flying caught fire midair, and he crashed near the airfield and was killed.
