= USS Chikaskia =

Oiler of the United States Navy

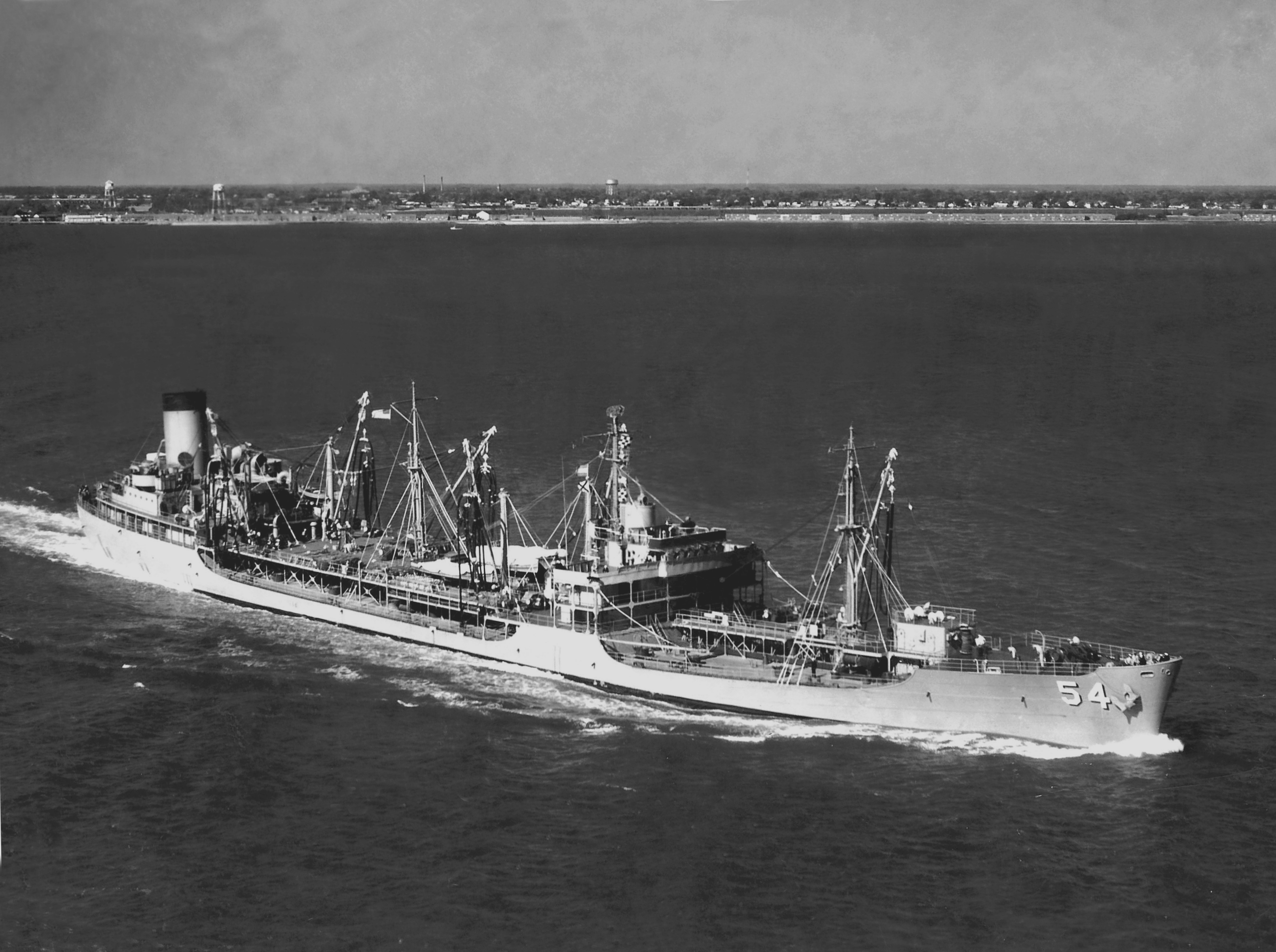
- USS Chikaskia (AO-54) underway in Hampton Roads in 1953

History

United States
- Name: USS Chikaskia
- Namesake: Chikaskia River in Kansas
- Builder: Bethlehem Shipbuilding Corporation, Bethlehem Sparrows Point Shipyard, Sparrows Point, Maryland
- Launched: 2 October 1942
- Sponsored by: Mrs. J. L. Bates
- Acquired: 10 January 1943
- Commissioned: 10 November 1943
- Decommissioned: 18 December 1969
- Stricken: 1 December 1976
- Fate: Sold for scrap, 26 May 1982

General characteristics
- Class & type: Cimarron-class oiler
- Type: T3-S2-A3 tanker hull
- Displacement: 7,236 long tons (7,352 t) light; 25,440 long tons (25,848 t) full load
- Length: 553 ft (169 m)
- Beam: 75 ft (23 m)
- Draft: 32 ft (9.8 m)
- Propulsion: Geared turbines, twin screws, 30,400 shp (22,669 kW)
- Speed: 18 knots (21 mph; 33 km/h)
- Capacity: 146,000 barrels
- Complement: 314
- Armament: 1 × 5 in (130 mm)/38 cal. gun; 4 × 3 in (76 mm)/50 cal. guns (4×1); 4 × twin 40 mm AA guns; 4 × twin 20 mm AA guns

Service record
- Operations: World War II, Korean War
- Awards: 6 battle stars (World War II); 1 battle star (Korea)

USS Chikaskia (AO-54) was a Cimarron-class fleet oiler acquired by the U.S. Navy during World War II. She served her country primarily in the Pacific Ocean Theatre of Operations, and provided petroleum products where needed to combat ships. For her very dangerous work under combat conditions, she was awarded six battle stars for World War II and one for the Korean War.

Chikaskia was launched 2 October 1942 by Bethlehem Sparrows Point Shipyard, Sparrows Point, Maryland, under a Maritime Commission contract; sponsored by Mrs. J. L. Bates; acquired by the Navy 10 January 1943; and commissioned 10 November 1943.

== World War II Pacific Theatre operations ==
On 15 December 1943 Chikaskia sailed from Norfolk, Virginia, loaded oil at Aruba and arrived at Pearl Harbor 7 January 1944. She joined Task Force 58 at Majuro 4 February and provided logistic support for the fast carrier force's strikes during the occupation of Kwajalein, and on Truk.

Between 7 March and 15 September 1944 Chikaskia operated out of Espiritu Santo, New Hebrides; Purvis Bay, Florida Island; and Manus, Admiralties, bringing vital at-sea replenishment of fuel to the fast carrier task forces and other ships. Departing Manus 18 September 1944 to aid the fast carrier task force engaged in the invasion of the southern Palaus, Chikaskia gave a striking illustration of her capabilities by simultaneously refueling USS Iowa and USS New Jersey 23 September.

== Surviving typhoon conditions ==
Changing her base to Ulithi on 25 October 1944, Chikaskia continued to support the fast carrier units. She was part of the fueling unit that endured the typhoon which struck the U.S. 3rd Fleet during a fueling rendezvous 18 December, weathering the heavy seas to return safely to Ulithi 24 December. She continued to provide logistic support during the operations in the Philippines, and the invasions of Iwo Jima and Okinawa until she returned to San Pedro, California, for overhaul 22 May 1945.

== End-of-war activity ==
Chikaskia returned to Ulithi to support the U.S. 3rd Fleet from 17 August 1945 until she entered Tokyo Bay 20 September. After a period of shuttle service in support of the operations in China and Korea (8–22 November), she served as station tanker at Sasebo from 29 November 1945 to 31 March 1946.

== Supporting nuclear testing ==
Chikaskia sailed from Sasebo 8 April 1946 bound for Bahrain, in the Persian Gulf, which she reached 30 April, and after loading oil, sailed for Kwajalein to participate in Operation Crossroads, the atomic weapons tests at Bikini Atoll.

== Korean War support ==
Assigned to the Naval Transportation Service 1 July 1947, Chikaskia continued to operate in the Far East. On 1 October 1949 she was assigned to the Military Sea Transportation Service, established that date. Returned to the Service Force, Pacific Fleet, 28 February 1953, Chikaskia fueled ships operating in the Korean War between 30 May and 27 July. She continued to operate in the Pacific until June 1955, when she returned to the United States.

== Final decommissioning ==
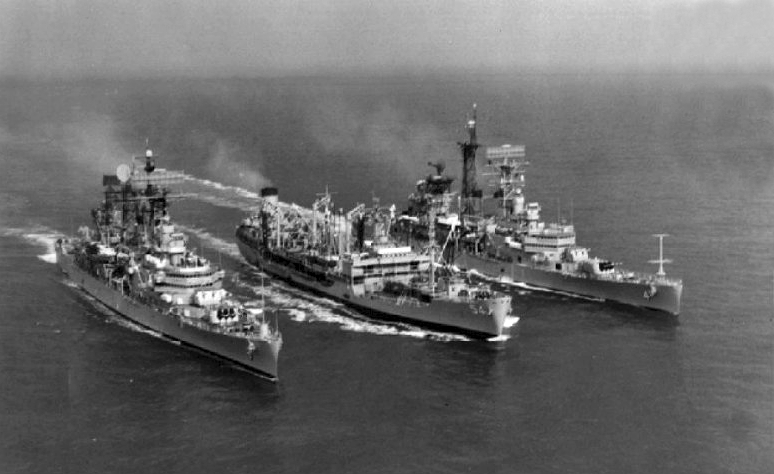
Chikaskia refueling Springfield and Little Rock, 1967.

Chikaskia was placed out of commission in reserve 7 November 1955. Recommissioned 12 December 1956 she was placed in the ready reserve in late 1957 and again joined the permanent Reserve Fleet in December 1958. Chikaskia was recommissioned on 17 December 1960. She was later decommissioned, 18 December 1969, at Philadelphia Naval Shipyard, Philadelphia, Pennsylvania. She was struck from the Naval Register, 1 December 1976 and transferred to the Maritime Administration for lay up in the National Defense Reserve Fleet. She was sold, 26 May 1982, her fate unknown.

== Awards ==
Chikaskia received six battle stars for World War II service and one star for Korean war service. This old warhorse served refueling support ships during the "Bay of Pigs" operation.
