= James H. Flatley III =

United States Navy admiral (1934–2025)

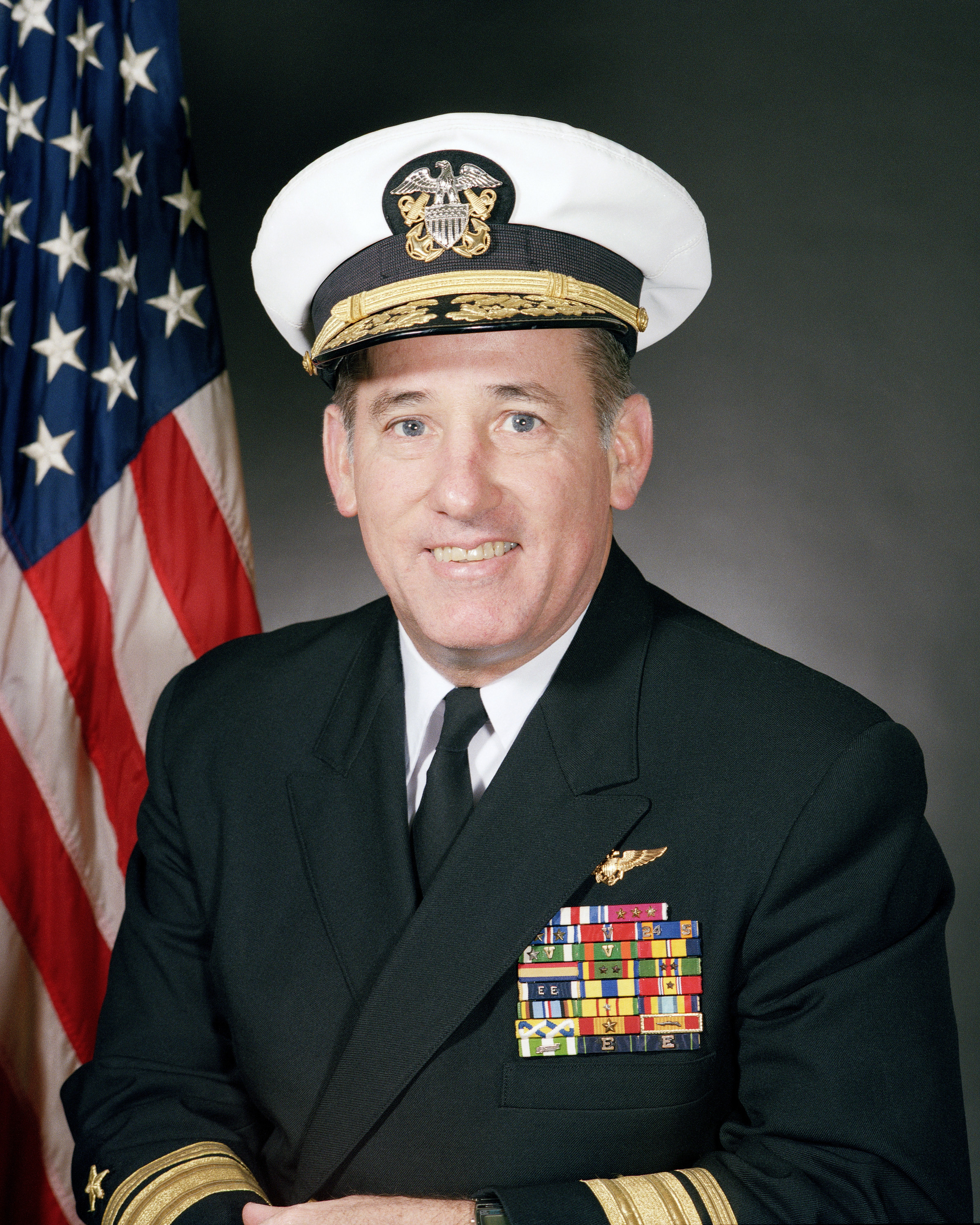
Rear Adm. Flatley in 1985

James Henry Flatley III (January 9, 1934 – December 12, 2025) was a rear admiral in the United States Navy. A naval aviator, fighter pilot and test pilot, he was the son of Vice Admiral James H. Flatley.

== Early life and education ==
Flatley was born in San Diego on January 9, 1934. He was a 1956 graduate of the United States Naval Academy. He later received an MBA from Auburn University.

== Career ==
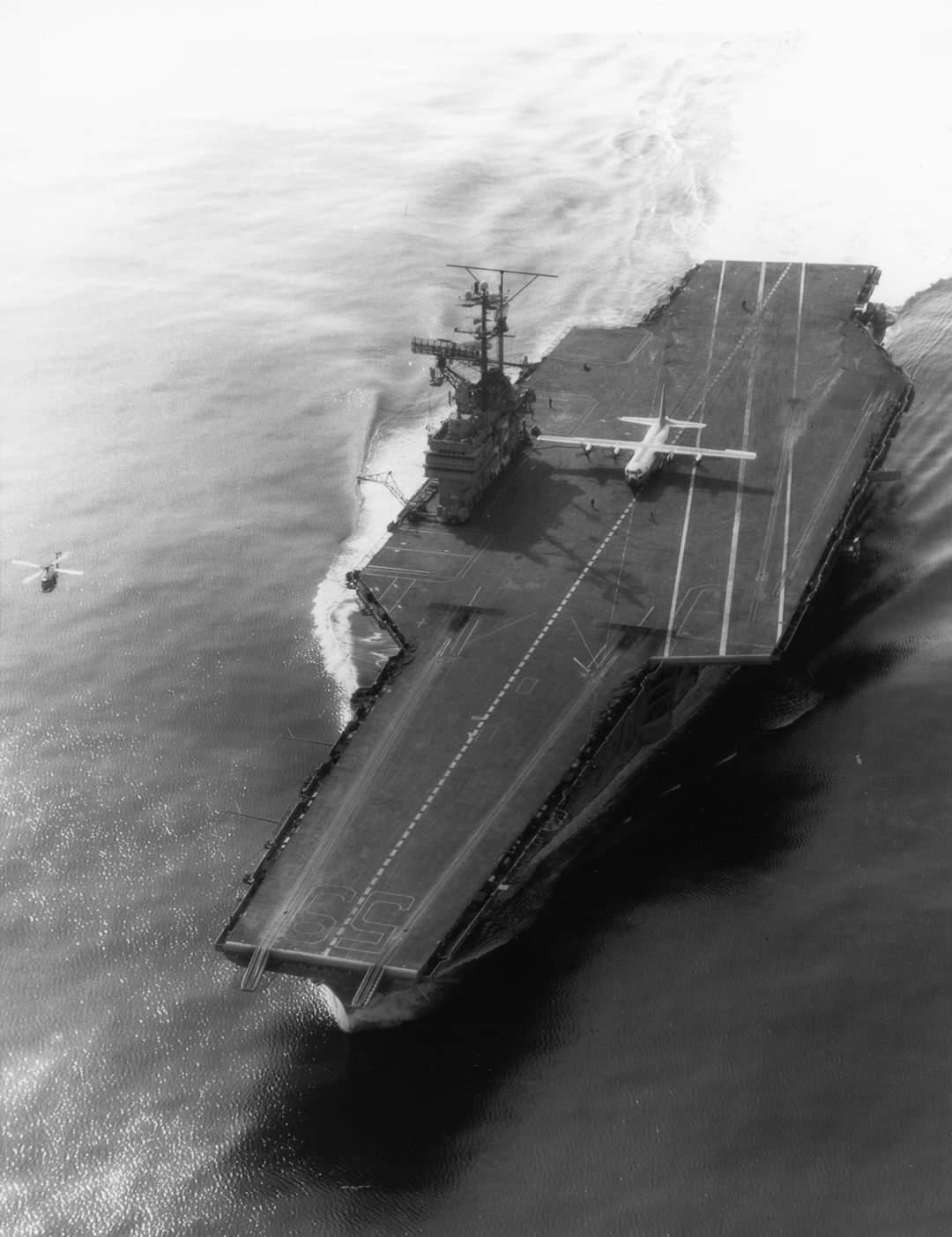
Flatley's KC-130F Hercules aboard the USS Forrestal (1963). The aircraft is now displayed at the National Museum of Naval Aviation.

While a lieutenant at the Naval Air Test Center at NAS Patuxent River, Maryland, Flatley and his fellow crew members, LCDR Walter W. "Smokey" Stovall and Aviation Machinist's Mate (Jet). V 1st Class Ed Brennan, made history when they completed 21 full-stop landings and takeoffs in a Lockheed C-130 Hercules aboard the aircraft carrier USS Forrestal; it was the largest plane, with the heaviest load, ever to successfully land on a carrier. Flatley later commanded the aircraft carrier USS Saratoga. While serving as the commanding officer of the USS Saratoga in 1980, he completed his 1,500th arrested landing in an F-4 Phantom. He retired in 1987.

In a June 2017 tribute article, Flatley discussed his history in the field of aviation and reflected on his and the Flatley family's legacy, estimating that the "extended Flatley family has accumulated more than 6,100 incident/accident-free arrested carrier landings."

== Personal life and death ==
Flatley was married to Nancy Monica Christie of Norfolk, Virginia. They had six children. Their two oldest sons, James H. Flatley IV and Joseph F. Flatley, are navy fighter pilots and their youngest daughter, Kara, is a lieutenant in the Supply Corps and is married to Richard Brophy, a navy fighter pilot. Her sister, Mary, is married to Rex Kiteley, a navy flight surgeon. RADM Flatley's father was James H. Flatley, the USS Yorktown's first air group commander and World War II fighter ace and the Pacific theater namesake for carrier aviations Safety Award – The Flatley Award.

He later resided in Charleston, South Carolina, with his wife. Flatley died on December 12, 2025, at the age of 91.

== Awards ==
Awards he received during his career include the Silver Star, the Distinguished Flying Cross and the Air Medal. He has also been inducted into the U.S. Naval Aviation Carrier Hall of Fame and the South Carolina Aviation Hall of Fame.
