= James H. Flatley =

American admiral (1906–1958)

James Henry Flatley Jr.
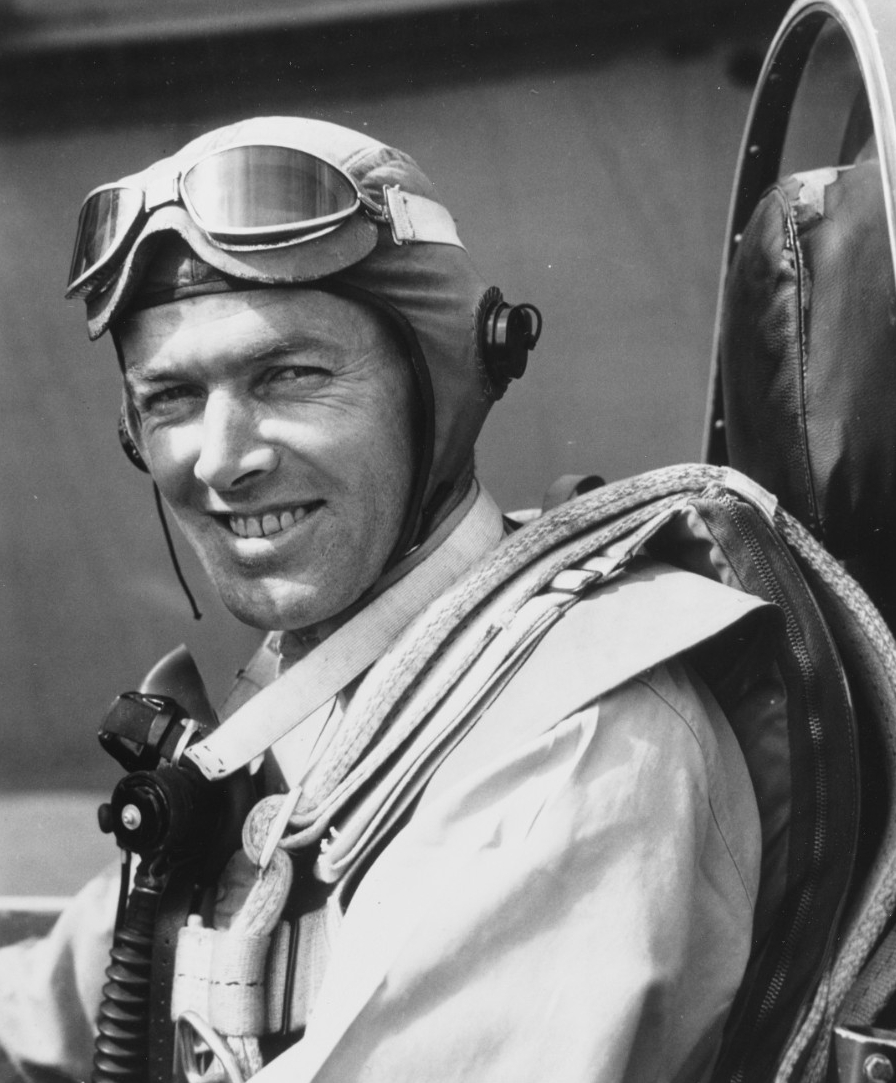
- Flatley [then Commander] in the cockpit of a Grumman F6F-3 Hellcat on board USS Yorktown (CV-10), October 1943
- Born: June 17, 1906; Green Bay, Wisconsin
- Died: July 9, 1958 (aged 52); Bethesda, Maryland
- Burial place: Arlington National Cemetery
- Military career
- Allegiance: United States of America
- Branch: United States Navy
- Service years: 1929–1958
- Rank: Vice Admiral
- Nickname: Jimmy
- Commands: Fighting Squadron 10 (VF-10); Carrier Air Wing 5 (CAW-5); USS Block Island (CVE-106); USS Lake Champlain (CV-39)
- Conflicts: World War II: Battle of the Coral Sea; Battle of the Santa Cruz Islands; Naval Battle of Guadalcanal; Guadalcanal Campaign; Philippines Campaign; Battle of Iwo Jima; Battle of Okinawa; Allied naval bombardments of Japan during World War II
- Awards: Navy Cross; Navy Distinguished Service Medal; Legion of Merit; Distinguished Flying Cross (3); Bronze Star Medal; Air Medal

Vice Admiral James Henry Flatley Jr. (June 17, 1906 – July 9, 1958) was a World War II naval aviator and tactician for the United States Navy (USN). He became a fighter ace credited with shooting down six enemy aircraft in aerial combat.

== Early life ==
Flatley was born in Green Bay, Wisconsin, and graduated from St. Norbert College. He was a 1929 United States Naval Academy graduate who earned his wings in 1931. An early squadron assignment found him with Patrol Squadron 4 (VP-4F), flying Douglas PD and Consolidated P2Y flying boats. In December 1941 he was with Fighting Squadron 2 (VF-2) flying the Brewster F2A Buffalo, the Navy’s first monoplane fighter.

== World War II ==
At the opening of hostilities in December 1941, Flatley was serving aboard USS Lexington (CV-2). However, his squadron did not see combat in the early raids, as VF-2 was beached from 25 January 1942 in order to transition from the F2A Buffalo to the Grumman F4F Wildcat. Their place, in the meantime, was taken by the Grumman-equipped Fighting Squadron 3 (VF-3).

In late April, 1942, just prior to the Battle of the Coral Sea, Flatley was dispatched to USS Yorktown (CV-5) with orders to take command of Fighting Squadron 42 (VF-42). However, on arrival, he discovered that his academy classmate, Lieutenant Commander Charles R. Fenton, had already been appointed CO by the ship's captain. After a few days, the issue was sorted out: Fenton was recognised as VF-42's commander, and Flatley was ordered back to the United States to form a new fighter squadron. However, he managed to get permission to stay for the coming battle, and was thus retained as VF-42's executive officer.

On 7 May, Flatley led a group of Grumman F4F Wildcat fighters to escort Douglas TBD Devastators from VT-5 in the attack that sank light carrier Shōhō. His group then engaged several Mitsubishi A5M fighters from Shōhō's Combat Air Patrol (CAP) and he managed to down one of them. In response to the sinking of Shōhō, the Imperial Japanese Navy (IJN) main carrier force launched a night strike on USN carriers composed of 15 Nakajima B5N and 12 Aichi D3A bombers. Flatley led one of the groups of F4F Wildcats that were sent to intercept (another group was led by Lieutenant Commander Paul Ramsey from VF-2). The enemy strike force suffered heavy losses. The following day, on 8 May, he was involved in CAP that protected USN carriers. His group engaged several Mitsubishi A6M Zero fighters and he claimed one shot down, although no Zeros were actually lost in the engagement.

After Coral Sea, he returned to the United States to form Fighting Squadron 10 (VF-10), flying F4F Wildcats. The squadron was nicknamed the "Grim Reapers," and as commanding officer Flatley became "Reaper Leader" on board USS Enterprise (CV-6).

During the Battle of the Santa Cruz Islands on 26 October 1942, Flatley led several F4F Wildcat fighters to escort Grumman TBF Avenger torpedo bombers from VT-10 in a strike on Japanese carriers. En route, the US and Japanese strike forces passed each other. Nine A6M Zeros from Zuihō led by Lieutenant Moriyasu Hidaka abandoned their escort duty and attacked the US strike. In the following fight, several TBF Avengers and F4F Wildcats were shot down, as well as several A6M Zeros. Flatley received one shared kill credit in this engagement. The strike force he was escorting could not locate the main IJN carrier force and instead attacked a cruiser. Flatley and his F4F Wildcats strafed it in order to support the torpedo planes, but all torpedoes missed the target. Later that day, his division of four F4F Wildcats encountered A6M Zeros from the carrier Jun'yō at higher altitude and deployed Thach Weave defensive tactics when they attacked. One of the attackers was Lieutenant Yoshio Shiga, who gave up after he made several runs.

During the Naval Battle of Guadalcanal on 15 November 1942, Enterprise launched a strike force against the damaged battleship Hiei and Flatley's group of Wildcats provided escort. After returning to Enterprise, Flatley led a second strike force against IJN transports with reinforcement and supplies headed for Guadalcanal. His group then landed on Guadalcanal and performed another CAP before turning over their aircraft to Marines at Henderson Field.

Following his tour as Commander Air Group Five (CAG-5) on board USS Yorktown (CV-10), during which he helped introduce the F6F Hellcat to combat in August 1943, Flatley at the age of 36 never flew combat again.

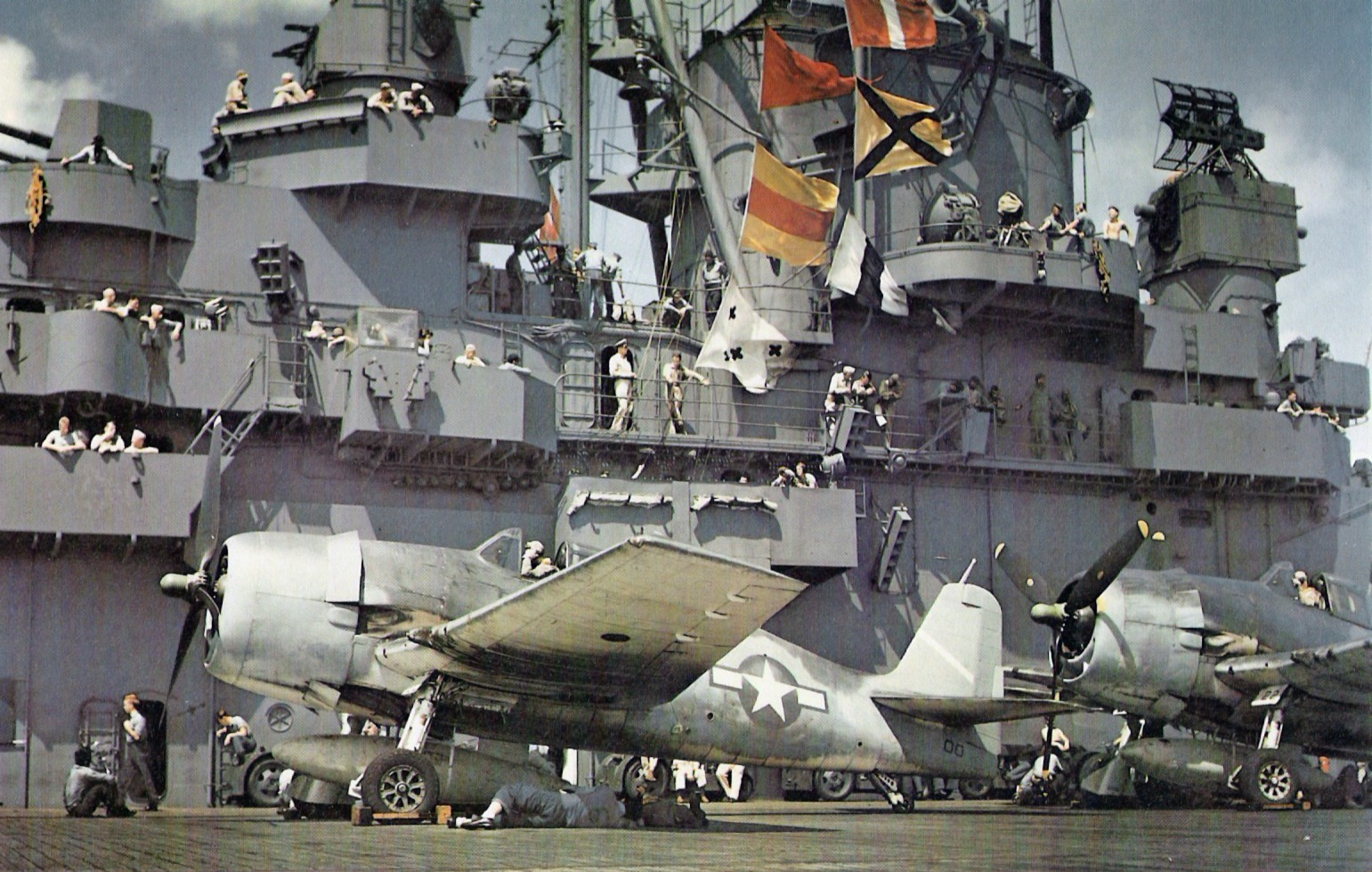
Commander Flatley as Commander Air Group 5 (CAG-5) in his F6F-3 Hellcat on the flight deck of USS Yorktown (CV-10) before takeoff during the Marcus Island raid on 31 August 1943. This raid was featured in the 1944 film The Fighting Lady.

He received a Navy Cross for Coral Sea; two Distinguished Flying Crosses for heroism, a Bronze Star for action with Japanese forces in the Philippine Islands, and the Navy Distinguished Service Medal.

== Post-war ==
Flatley remained in the Navy after the war and became a key figure with the Navy's postwar air-training program. After commanding the escort aircraft carrier USS Block Island (CVE-106) for a year, Flatley became deeply involved with assessing naval aviation's disastrous safety record and ultimately helped develop the Naval Aviation Safety Center, today's Naval Safety Center.

After the war he was training director of the Naval Air Station Corpus Christi in Corpus Christi, Texas Air Station; commander of the Naval Air Station Olathe in Olathe, Kansas (which was renamed "Flatley Field" from 1962 to 1969); and commander of the Naval Station Norfolk in Norfolk, Virginia, followed by command of the carrier USS Lake Champlain (CV-39). He also held various staff positions. He retired from the Navy on June 2, 1958, and was promoted to vice admiral concurrent with his retirement. He died from cancer, barely a month after his retirement at the National Naval Medical Center in Bethesda, Maryland, on July 9, 1958, and was buried at Arlington National Cemetery two days later.

== Tactician ==
During the attack on the Shōhō, Flatley observed numerous torpedo and dive bombers wasting their ordnance on an already finished carrier, instead of diverting to other intact ships. Based on this observation, he later proposed that a designated strike coordinator be assigned during future operations to assign targets.

Flatley criticized the practice of launching numerous small strikes piecemeal, as happened at the Battle of the Santa Cruz Islands, since he felt strongly that one large force could accomplish much more than several small ones.

Flatley – along with John S. Thach and Butch O'Hare – was instrumental in communicating tactical advice throughout naval aviation, and changing the perception that the F4F Wildcat was inferior to the Japanese Zero. Flatley's belief was that it was superior to the Zero when properly utilized, saying of the Wildcat: "Let us not be too critical of our equipment. It shoots the enemy down in flames and brings most of us home." He was not overly impressed by the Zero, but attributed the Japanese fighter's success to the high quality of Japanese pilots. His writeup on enemy capabilities received favorable notice at senior levels of the U.S. Navy.

The expression "Thach Weave" did not come into the lexicon until Flatley named it in his after action report for the Battle of the Santa Cruz Islands. He recounted how Lieutenant Commander John S. Thach’s "beam defense tactic" had allowed him to escape almost certain destruction during the battle. Flatley wrote: ". . . the four-plane division is the only thing that will work, and I am calling it the Thach Weave."

Flatley later received a commendation for his bravery in retrieving wounded personnel after the carrier USS Bunker Hill (CV-17) was hit by kamikazes on May 11, 1945.

== Awards and honors ==
His awards include:

Badge	Naval Aviator insignia		
1st Row	Navy Cross	Navy Distinguished Service Medal	Legion of Merit w/ Combat "V"
2nd Row	Distinguished Flying Cross w/ two 5/16" gold stars	Bronze Star Medal w/ Combat "V"	Air Medal
3rd Row	Navy and Marine Corps Commendation Medal w/ Combat "V"	Navy Presidential Unit Citation w/ 3/16" silver star	American Defense Service Medal w/ Fleet clasp
4th Row	American Campaign Medal	Asiatic Pacific Campaign Medal w/ two 3/16" silver stars	World War II Victory Medal
5th Row	Navy Occupation Service Medal w/ 'Japan' clasp	National Defense Service Medal	Philippine Liberation Medal w/ 3/16" bronze star

=== Navy Cross citation ===

Lieutenant Commander James Flatley
U.S. Navy
Date Of Action: 7 and 8 May 1942

The President of the United States of America takes pleasure in presenting the Navy Cross to Lieutenant Commander James Henry Flatley, Jr., United States Navy, for extraordinary heroism in operations against the enemy while serving as Pilot of a carrier-based Navy Fighter Plane and Executive Officer of Fighting Squadron FORTY-TWO (VF-42), attached to the U.S.S. YORKTOWN (CV-5), in action against enemy Japanese forces in the Battle of the Coral Sea on 7 and 8 May 1942. As leader of the fighter escort for our own planes attacking an enemy Japanese carrier on 7 May, Lieutenant Commander Flatley fearlessly engaged enemy fighters, destroying one and assisting in the destruction of another with no loss to his escort group. That evening, he led a division on combat air patrol in a fierce attack and resultant dispersal of a formation of enemy scouting planes, assisting in the destruction of two of them. On 8 May, fighting persistently and at great odds, he again led a division of the combat air patrol in a courageous attack against enemy aircraft attacking our surface forces and destroyed an enemy fighter harassing our anti-torpedo plane patrol and assisted in the destruction of two others. On all these occasions, Lieutenant Commander Flatley displayed the highest qualities of leadership, aggressiveness and complete disregard for his own personal safety.

=== Legacy ===
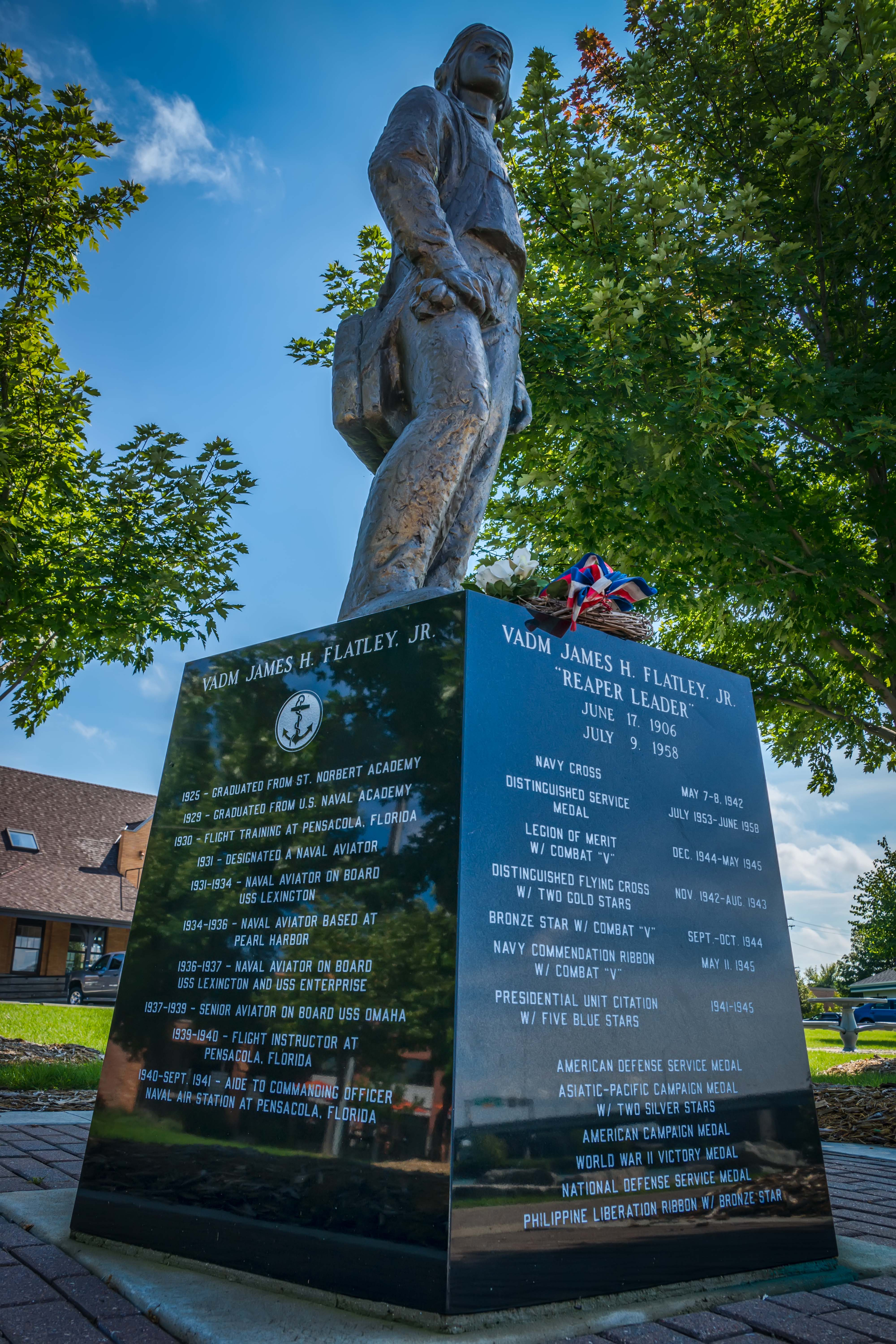
Statue of Flatley in Admiral Flatley Park in Green Bay

- USS Flatley (FFG-21)
- Admiral Flatley Park in Green Bay.
- The Admiral Flatley Memorial Award for aviation safety is awarded each year to one aircraft carrier and amphibious ship, along with their embarked air wing and Marine expeditionary unit.
- United States Naval Sea Cadet Corps (USNSCC) VADM James H. Flatley Jr. Division, Green Bay, Wisconsin
- His son, James H. Flatley III, became a naval aviator and test pilot, eventually achieving the rank of rear admiral
- His grandsons, James H. Flatley IV and Joseph F. Flatley, became naval officers and aviators
