= Macgregor Kilpatrick =

American ice hockey executive (1916-1997)

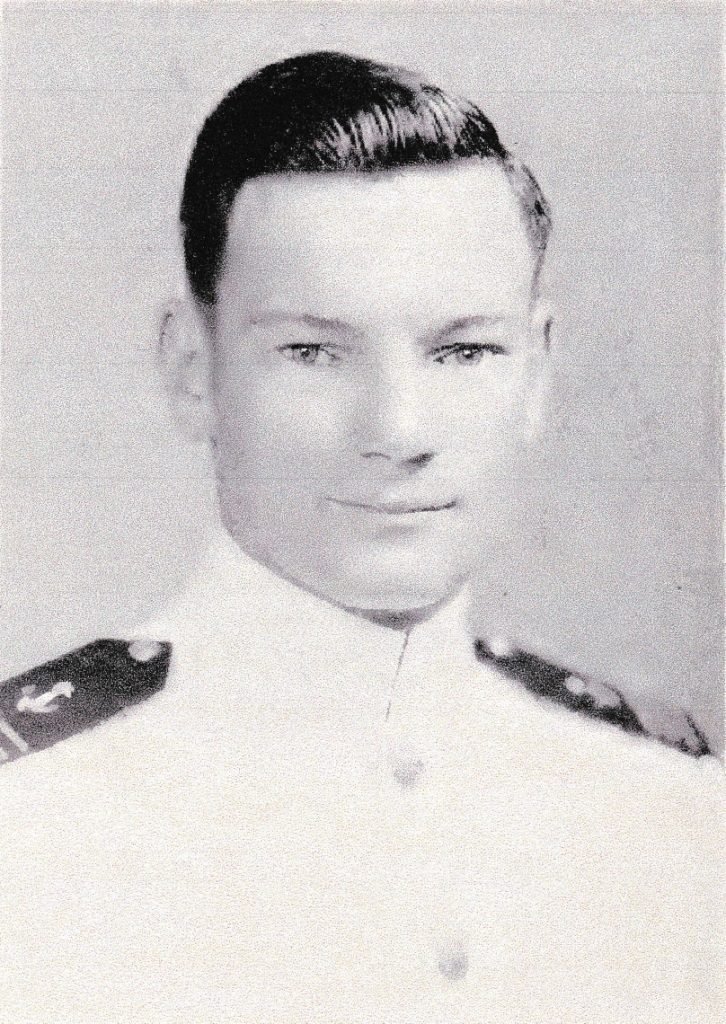
- United States Naval Academy yearbook portrait of Midshipman Kilpatrick
- Born: July 30, 1916; New York
- Died: August 30, 1997 (aged 81)
- Military career
- Branch: United States Navy
- Service years: 1939–47
- Rank: Commander
- Commands: VF-5
- Conflicts: World War II
- Awards: Navy Cross; Distinguished Flying Cross; Air Medal
- Other work: ice hockey executive (American Hockey League)

Macgregor Kilpatrick (July 30, 1916 – August 30, 1997) was an American ice hockey executive. He was an original owner of the New Haven Nighthawks of the American Hockey League (AHL). He also served as senior vice president and general counsel for the AHL.

Raised in Ardsley, New York, Kilpatrick attended the United States Naval Academy where he was an All-America soccer player in the Class of 1939. During World War II he served as a fighter pilot in the Pacific and was awarded the Navy Cross and the Distinguished Flying Cross for his valor and heroism in combat. While serving with Fighting Squadron Ten (VF-10) on USS Enterprise, he shot down two Japanese torpedo bombers on January 30, 1943, and was subsequently awarded the Distinguished Flying Cross. As commanding officer of Fighting Squadron Five (VF-5) on USS Franklin, Lieutenant Commander Kilpatrick helped lead damage control and wounded evacuation efforts on March 19, 1945, and was subsequently awarded the Navy Cross. He was redeployed on USS Intrepid before the end of the war in 1945. Kilpatrick received a promotion to commander when he retired from active duty in June 1947.

After returning from the war, he earned a law degree from Yale Law School in 1950 and practiced law in Branford, Connecticut, forming the firm of Kilpatrick, Kahl and Josephson with other former Navy officers. Kilpatrick was also elected Branford town moderator and probate judge.

In 1970, he was approved as an owner of the expansion team, the New Haven Nighthawks, which began play with the 1972–73 AHL season.

He was selected to receive the 1975–76 James C. Hendy Memorial Award, as the executive who made the most outstanding contribution to the AHL.

In the summer of 1997, the American Hockey League created the Macgregor Kilpatrick Trophy, which is presented annually to the AHL team that finishes the regular season with the most points.

After retirement, Kilpatrick moved to Hilton Head Island, South Carolina. He died on August 30, 1997.

In 2010, Kilpatrick was posthumously inducted into the American Hockey League Hall of Fame.
