= VF-51 =

Fighter Squadron 51
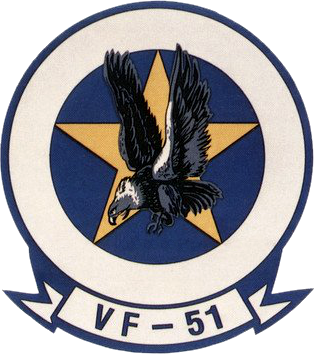
- VF-51 squadron patch
- Active: 15 February 1943 – 31 March 1995
- Country: United States
- Branch: United States Navy
- Nickname: Screaming Eagles
- Engagements: World War II; Korean War; Vietnam War; Operation Earnest Will; Operation Restore Hope; Operation Southern Watch; *January 1993 airstrikes on Iraq; 1994 North Korean nuclear crisis

Commanders
- Notable commanders: Macgregor Kilpatrick; Robert F. Willard

Aircraft flown
- Fighter: FJ-1 Fury; F9F-3 Panther; Vought F-8 Crusader; F-4 Phantom II; F-14A Tomcat

VF-51, Fighter Squadron 51 was an aviation unit of the United States Navy known as the "Screaming Eagles". It was originally established as VF-1 on 1 February 1943, redesignated as VF-5 on 15 July 1943, redesignated as VF-5A on 15 November 1946, redesignated VF-51 on 16 August 1948, and disestablished in March 1995. Until its disestablishment, VF-51 was the oldest fighter squadron in continuous service with the Pacific Fleet.

== History ==
=== 1940s ===
VF-51's roots are traced back to 1927 when the Screaming Eagles insignia could be seen with the VF-3S Striking Eagles which flew the Curtis F6C-4.

In October 1947, the Screaming Eagles became the first Navy squadron to enter the jet age with delivery of the North American FJ-1 Fury; the squadron used this fighter to conduct the USN's first operational all-jet aircraft carrier landing at sea on 10 March 1948 aboard USS Boxer. VF-51 then transitioned to the Grumman F9F-3 Panther.

=== 1950s ===
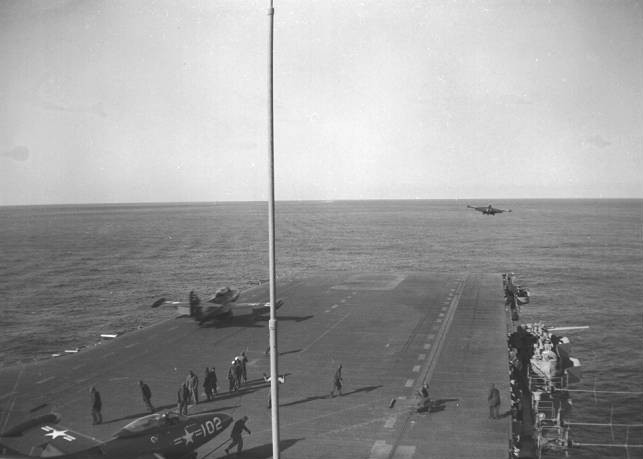
F9F-2s launching from USS Essex in 1951

On 3 July 1950, VF-51 launched off the USS Valley Forge CV-45 and became one of the first squadrons to take Carrier-based jets into combat.

On that day, LTJG. Leonard H. Plog scored the first Navy air-to-air kill in the Korean War when he hit and blew off the wing of North Korean Yak-9 taking off. This had occurred after he and 11 other VF-51 had been strafing an airfield near Pyongyang as part of strike with aircraft from HMS Triumph.

Due to fears of a possible invasion of the Republic of China on Taiwan, VF-51 and the rest of the Valley Forge's Air Group and the Triumph moved south to keep watch before rejoining the war on 18 July. Future astronaut and first man to walk on the Moon, Neil Armstrong, was also a Naval Aviator in VF-51 during this period.

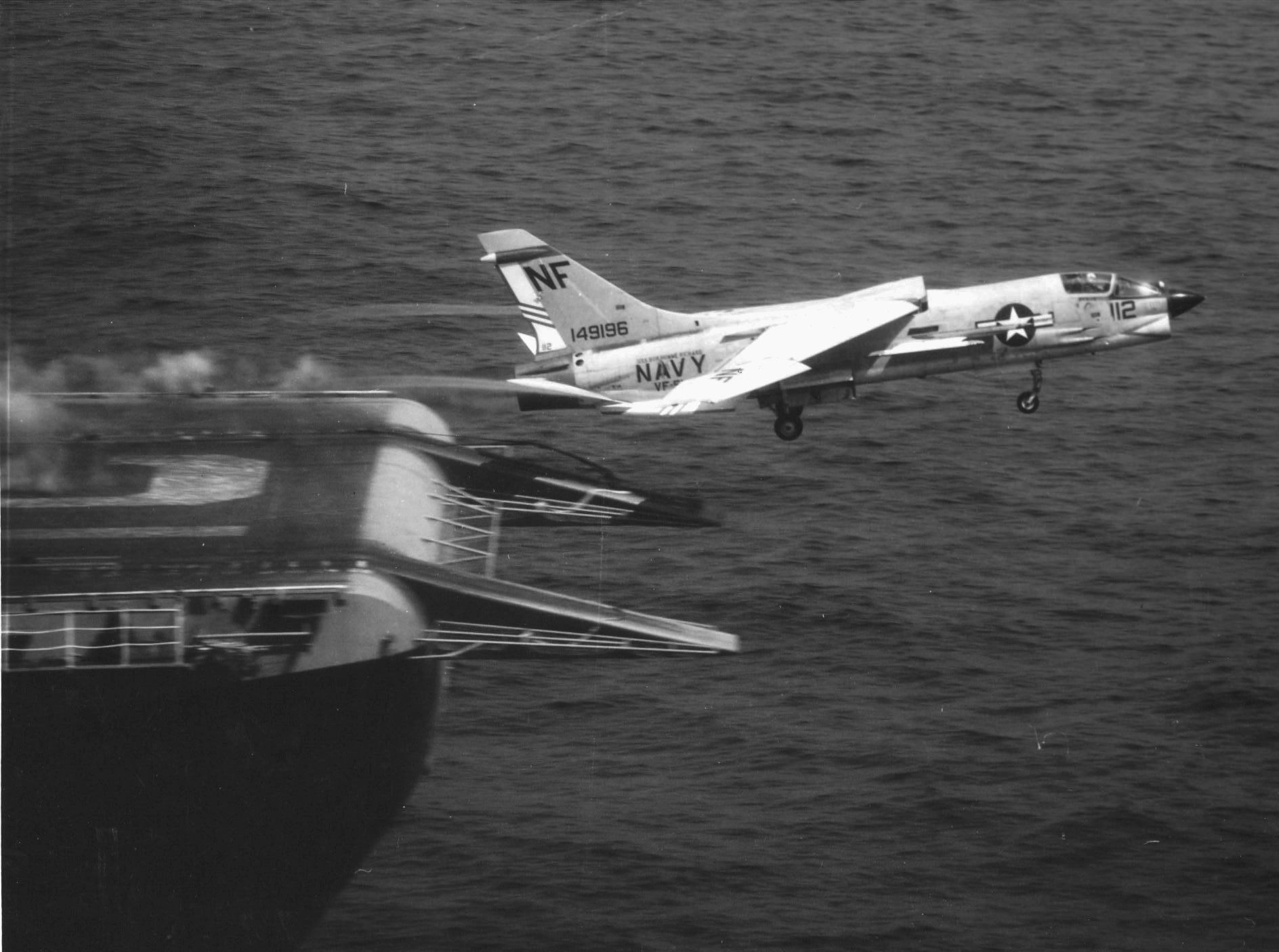
VF-51 F-8E launching from USS Bon Homme Richard in 1970

=== 1960s ===
During the Vietnam War, VF-51 was the first squadron to evaluate the air-to-ground capability of the F-8 Crusader, and because of this, VF-51 was picked to fly secret interdiction missions into Laos in June 1964. In 1965 VF-51 flew F-8 Crusaders off the USS Ticonderoga (CVA 14) flying missions into Vietnam and Laos. The squadron became MiG killers when they shot down two North Vietnamese MiG-21s in 1968.

=== 1970s ===
In 1971 VF-51 transitioned to the F-4 Phantom and shot down four MiG-17s. VF-51 flew from USS Coral Sea since November 1971 until July 1975.

In 1976, VF-51 and the rest of Carrier Air Wing 15 was deployed on a peacetime Mediterranean cruise on USS Franklin D. Roosevelt, returning in April 1977. The purpose of this cruise on a soon-to-be scrapped carrier was to take the first squadron of United States Marine Corps AV-8A Harriers to sea.

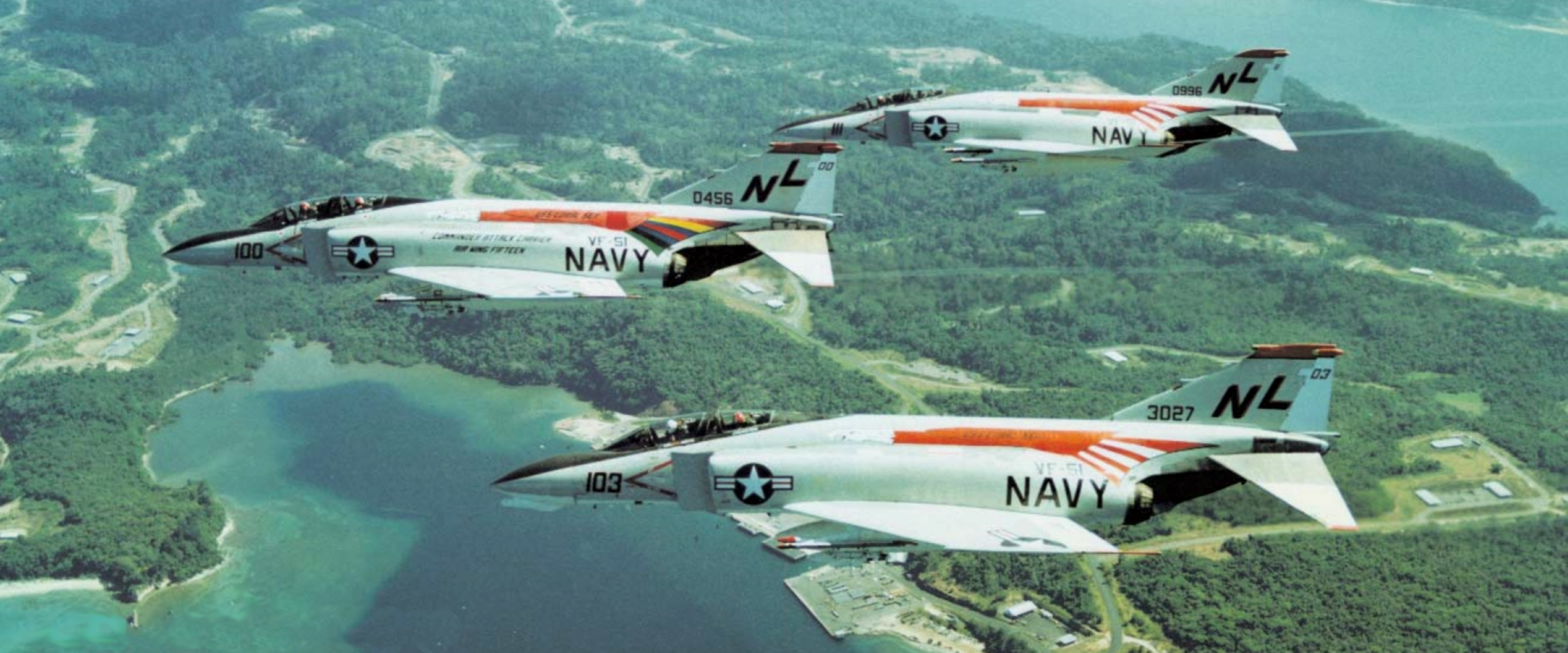
F-4Bs in the 1972 Screaming Eagle (also known as the Supersonic Can Opener) paint scheme

Following this Mediterranean cruise and return to NAS Miramar, VF-51 phased out its F-4 Phantom IIs. On 16 June 1978, VF-51 transitioned to the Block 100 version of the F-14A Tomcat and their first cruise with the F-14 was in May 1979 with Carrier Air Wing 15 aboard USS Kitty Hawk. As part of CVW-15, VF-51 remained partnered with its sister squadron, VF-111, also flying the F-14. This cruise, originally slated to end in early December 1979, was extended by Presidential direction during the Kitty Hawk Battle Group's final port call in the Philippines in late November 1979 as a result of the seizure of the American Embassy in Iran the same month and the subsequent Iranian Hostage Crisis. Both squadrons participated in the preparatory efforts to rescue American hostages in Iran, frequently intercepting both Iranian and Soviet aircraft in the region, but departing the Indian Ocean in February 1980 and turning responsibilities over to the USS Nimitz Battle Group and its embarked Carrier Air Wing 8 with VF-41 and VF-84 prior to execution of Operation Eagle Claw. For this 1979–1980 deployment, VF-51 was awarded the Battle E as the top fighter squadron in the Pacific Fleet.

=== 1980s ===
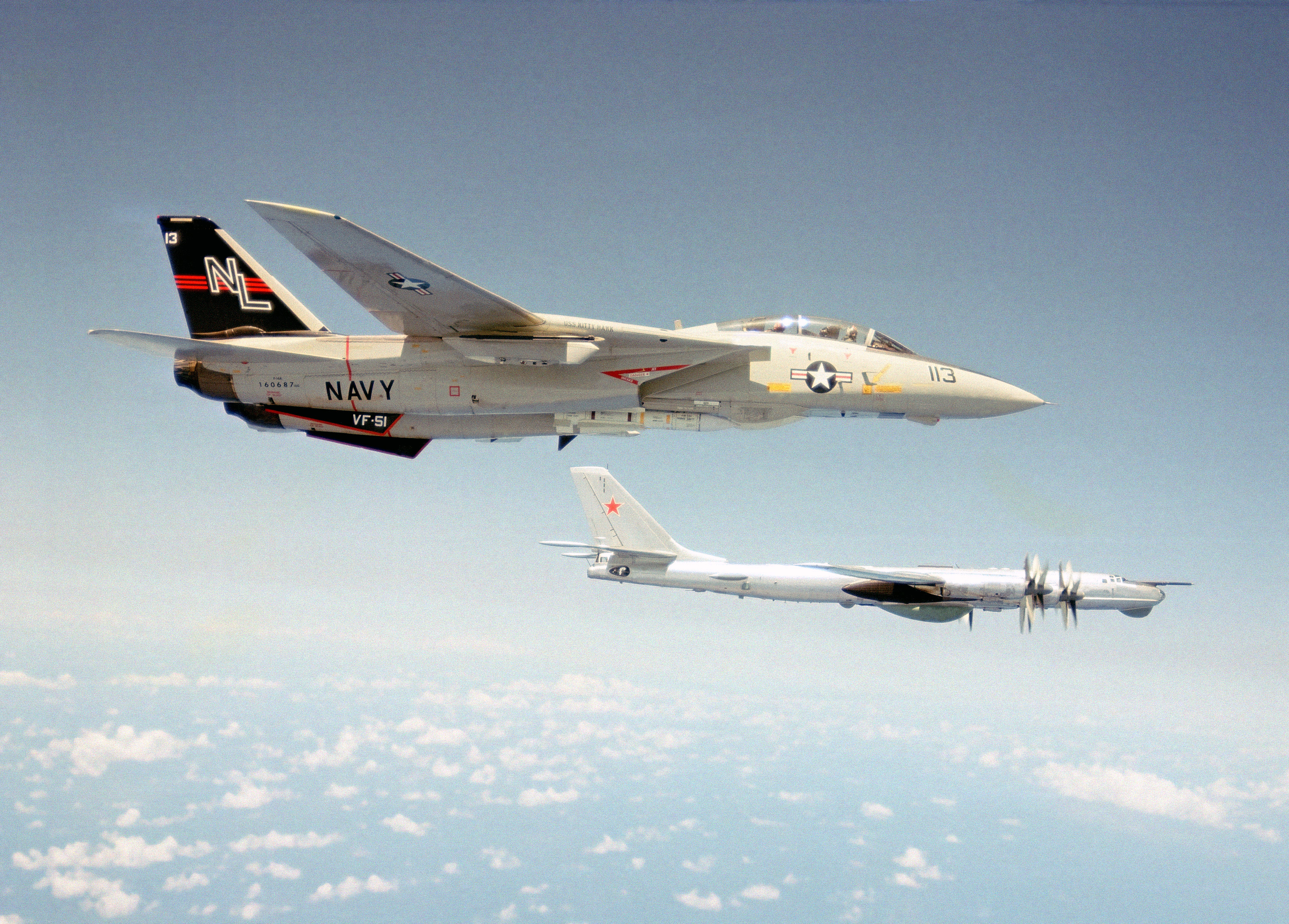
VF-51 F-14A intercepting a Tu-142 "Bear".

During their 1981 cruise, on 7 September; NL-106 (One of VF-51's aircraft) was struck by an NL-306, an A-7E Corsair II from VA-22. While both aircraft's crew survived, a deckhand from VF-51 was killed in the accident. After that cruise with the Kitty Hawk, the air wing moved to the East coast for a short period of time, flying from the newly introduced USS Carl Vinson from March to October 1983 as the ship transited via an around-the-world cruise to its new homeport of NAS Alameda, California and assignment to the Pacific Fleet.

VF-51 is credited to be the first F-14 squadron to intercept Soviet Tu-22M (Tu-26) Backfire bombers, armed MiG-23 Floggers and Su-15 Flagons using the Tomcat's TCS (Television Camera Sight). The TCS allowed the crew to passively identify a target to determine if it was hostile or not.

During the 1986–1987 cruise with USS Carl Vinson, VF-51 conducted operations in the Bering Sea during the winter. Carl Vinson and CVW-15, with VF-51 attached, departed for the ship's fourth overseas deployment on 15 June 1988. While on station, the carrier supported Operation Earnest Will, the escort of U.S. flagged tankers in the Persian Gulf. The carrier returned to the States on 16 December 1988 and was awarded the Admiral Flatley Memorial Award for aviation safety for 1988. In February 1990, USS Carl Vinson conducted operations in the Western Pacific and Indian Ocean. VF-51 and VF-111 took part in several exercises with regional air forces, including Singapore, Malaysia and Thailand. The air wing returned home on 29 July.

=== 1990s ===
Original Navy plans saw VF-51 and VF-111 becoming the first deployable squadrons to transition to the F-14D Super Tomcat, however these plans were cancelled in December 1991. After moving back to the Kitty Hawk with CVW-15, VF-51 participated in RIMPAC 1992 between June and July 1992. The squadron along with the rest of CVW-15 left on their 1992 WESTPAC cruise on 3 November 1992.

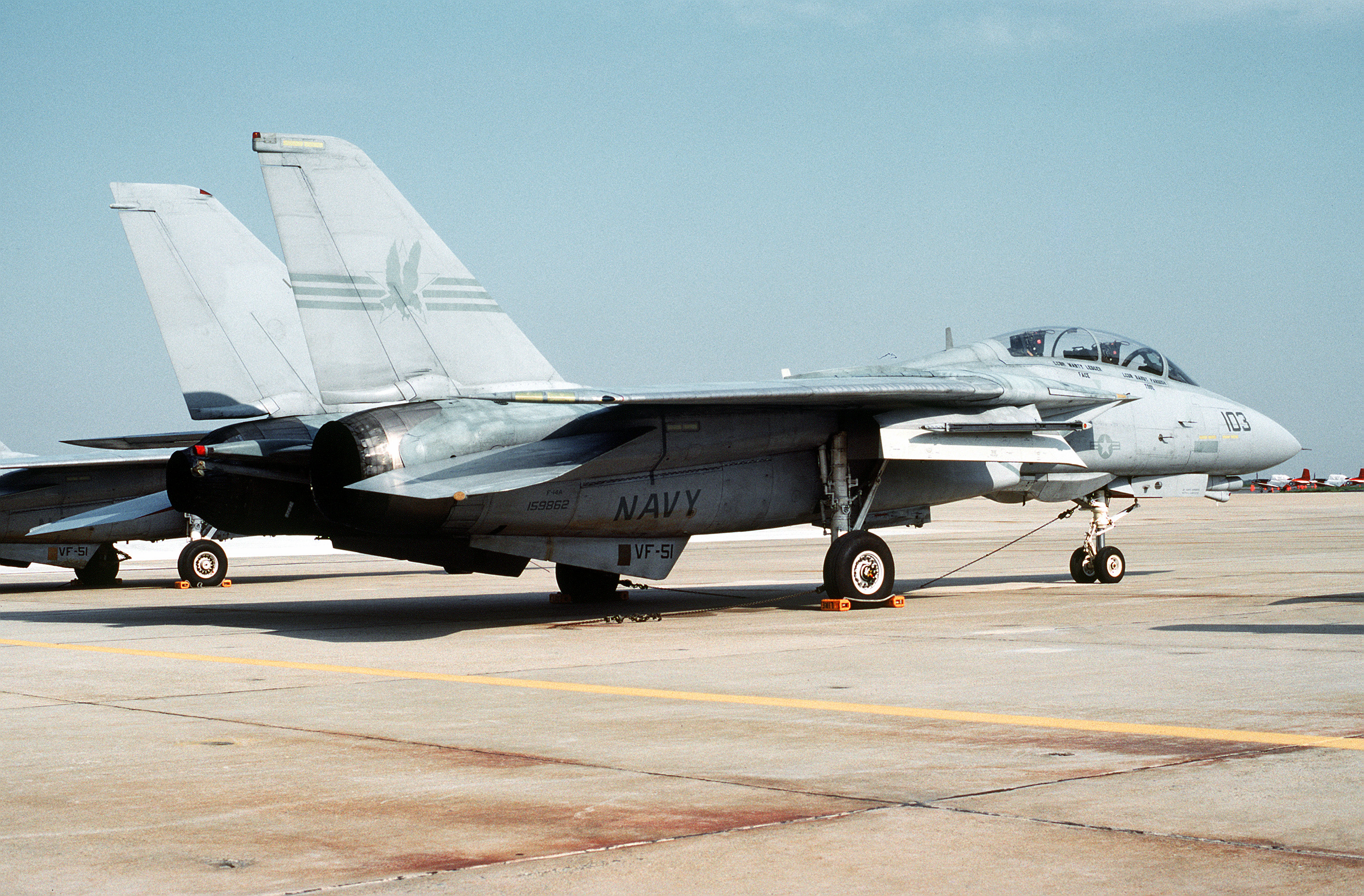
NL-103, an F-14A of VF-51 at Andrews AFB in 1993.

After relieving the USS Ranger CV-61 and CVW-2 on 18 December, VF-51 and the rest of the air wing took up station off the coast of Somalia as part of Operation Restore Hope. After an Iraqi MiG-25 was shot down by a USAF F-16D, on 27 December 1992, the VF-51 and CVW-15 were ordered to the Persian Gulf. By 1 January, the squadron as well as other CVW-15 assets had flown a total of 51 CAP missions. On 13 January 1993, VF-51 along with VF-111 together contributed four of their F-14As as escort for an air strike targeting SAM sites in Southern Iraq. After turning over to CVW-9 and the USS Nimitz CVN-68 on 18 March, VF-51 returned on 3 May 1993.

VF-51 and CVW-15 began their final deployment on 24 June 1994. Originally slated to be another Southern Watch deployment, the Air Wing was diverted to the Korean Peninsula in light of the Nuclear crisis and the recent death of North Korean leader Kim Il-Sung. On 11 July 1994, NL-102 (An F-14A assigned to VF-51) struck the back deck of the Kitty Hawk while landing in stormy seas and split into two pieces. Both the Pilot and RIO ejected from the fireball but the Pilot landed into the flames. Despite this, he survived although he received severe burns. Secretary of the Navy John H. Dalton visited the ship on 15 October to award those who saved the pilot's life. VF-51 arrived back from their last cruise on 22 December 1994. On 31 March 1995, the squadron was decommissioned.

== Notable members ==
- Scott Altman
- Neil Armstrong
- Donald C. Davis
- Ronald Evans
- John L. Finley
- Tom Kilcline Jr.
- Macgregor Kilpatrick
- Michael Manazir
- James Stockdale
- Robert F. Willard

== In popular culture ==
=== Role in the Top Gun franchise ===
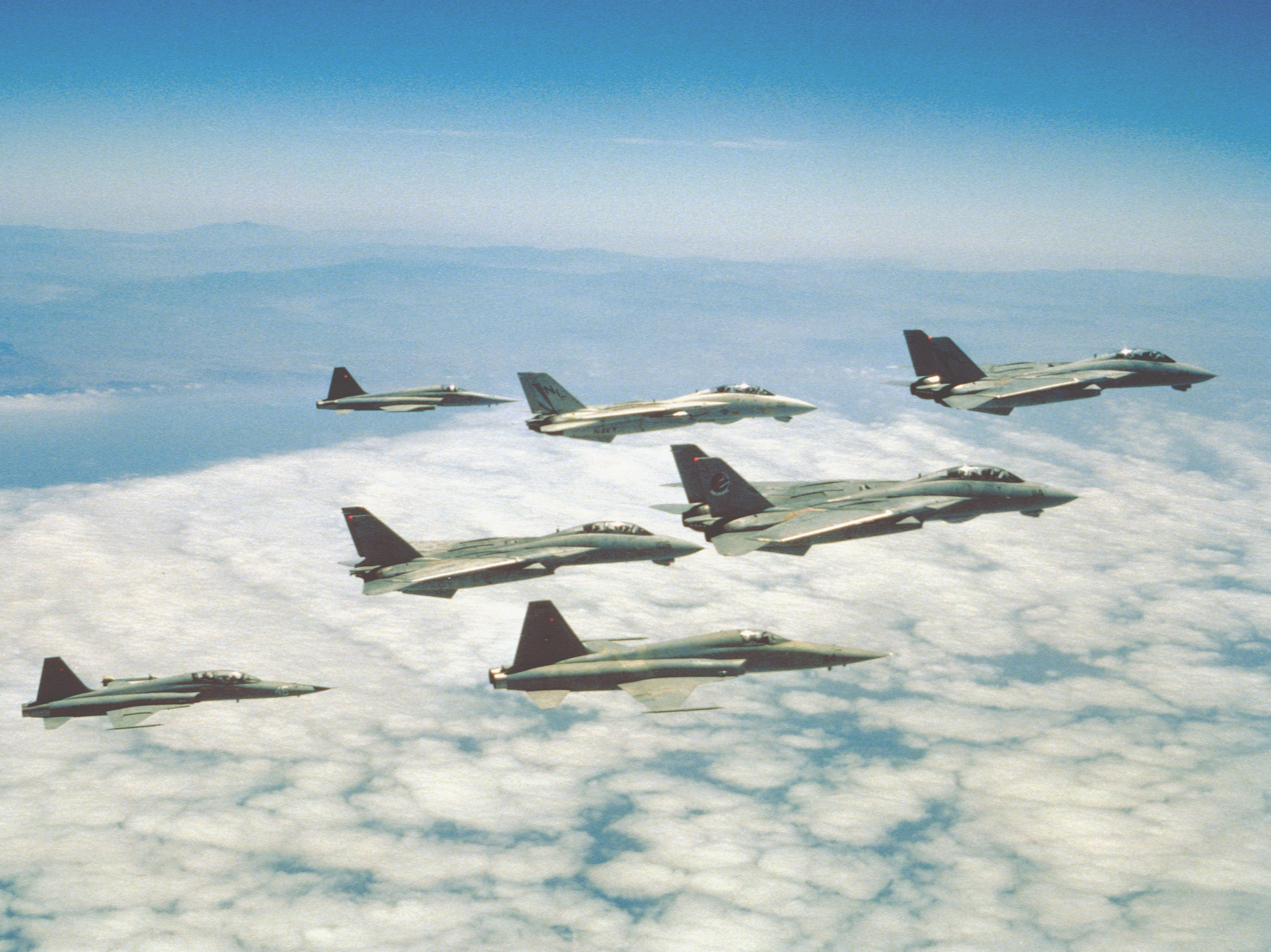
F-14A Tomcats of VF-51 and VF-111 "Sundowners". The squadrons provided F-14s for filming aerial sequences in the movie Top Gun.

In 1985, VF-51 was one of several NAS Miramar based squadrons to participate in the filming of Top Gun. Some VF-51 and VF-111 aircraft were repainted in fictitious squadron markings for the film, and most of the personnel credited with flying F-14s for stunt sequences were members of VF-51 at the time of production. To be able to film the sequences, the F-14s were fitted with cameras mounted in pods attached to the underbelly Phoenix pallets and the under wing pylons, as well as using ground mounted cameras. After filming wrapped, one of the VF-51 aircraft used in filming (BuNo 160694) was sent to the USS Lexington Museum in Corpus Christi, Texas, where it is currently displayed in the markings applied to it during the making of the movie. In the film, the character Viper (played by Tom Skerritt) mentions flying with VF-51 off the USS Oriskany with Maverick's father. In real life, VF-51 never flew F-4s off Oriskany, as the Phantom was too large for that carrier; VF-51 begin to fly F-4 Phantom II since 1971 on CV-43 Coral Sea. Additionally, VF-51 was never stationed aboard the Oriskany during its Vietnam deployments, it also was flying the F-8 Crusader during the time Maverick’s father was alleged to be shot down, not the F-4.

In the sequel Top Gun: Maverick, the character Robert "Bob" Floyd (a NFO, Topgun graduate and mission candidate) is shown with "VFA-51" insignia and helmet bag. This is a fictitious tribute to the squadron due to VF-51 being disestablished instead of transitioning to the F/A-18.

== See also ==
- History of the United States Navy
- List of inactive United States Navy aircraft squadrons
- List of United States Navy aircraft squadrons
