= Tom Kilcline Jr. =

American Navy admiral (born 1951)

Thomas J. Kilcline Jr
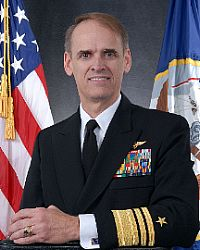
- Born: November 19, 1951 (age 74); Oakland, California
- Military career
- Allegiance: United States
- Branch: United States Navy
- Service years: 1973–2010
- Rank: Vice Admiral
- Commands: Naval Air Forces; Carrier Strike Group Two; Carrier Air Wing Fourteen; VF-154
- Conflicts: Vietnam War; Gulf War
- Awards: Navy Distinguished Service Medal; Defense Superior Service Medal (2); Legion of Merit (5)

Thomas John Kilcline Jr. (born November 19, 1951) is a retired vice admiral of the United States Navy who served as Commander, Naval Air Forces from June 22, 2007, to July 1, 2010.

== Naval career ==
Kilcline graduated from the United States Naval Academy in 1973 with a Bachelor of Science in operations research. He was selected for naval aviation and upon receiving his commission was sent to NAS Pensacola for initial flight training. He earned his wings in 1975.

Following completion of replacement air group training at NAS Miramar, California, he was assigned to VF-51 aboard the USS Franklin D. Roosevelt (CV-42) flying the F-4 Phantom. Soon afterward, the squadron transitioned to the F-14 Tomcat and moved aboard the USS Kitty Hawk (CV-63). Next he was selected for VF-126, where he flew as an adversary pilot. Two deployments followed with VF-213 aboard USS Enterprise (CVN-65). His first command was of VF-154, stationed in NAS Atsugi, Japan aboard the USS Independence (CV-62). He later assumed command of Carrier Air Wing 14 aboard USS Abraham Lincoln (CVN-72). His most recent operational assignment was as commander, Carrier Strike Group Two and commander, USS Theodore Roosevelt Carrier Strike Group. He has flown over 5,600 hours in F-4, A-4, F-5, F-14 and F/A-18 aircraft, and has logged 63 combat missions. He has made 1,150 carrier aircraft arrested landings, making him a member of the 1000 trap "Grand Club".

Assignments to shore and staff billets include Fighter AEW Wing Pacific strike officer; Joint Task Force Southwest Asia DJ3; Air Operations Officer to Commander 2nd Fleet; Chief of Naval Operations Chair to the National War College; executive assistant to Deputy, European Command; and Chief of Staff for Commander, Naval Air Forces. Kilcline earned a Master of Science in Systems Management from the University of Southern California, graduating with distinction; He received a Master of Arts in Strategic Studies and National Affairs from the U.S. Naval War College, and earned his Master of Science in National Security Strategy while assigned to the National War College.

Kilcline's first shore duty flag assignment was as director, Naval Aviation Plans and Requirements (N780) on the OPNAV Staff. Following his strike group command, he assumed duties as director, Air Warfare Division (N88) followed by his assignment as director, Warfare Requirements and Integration/Senior National Representative (N8F). He assumed the duties of Commander, Naval Air Forces on June 22, 2007. Kilcline handed over command on July 1, 2010, to Vice Admiral Allen G. Myers, retiring shortly afterward.

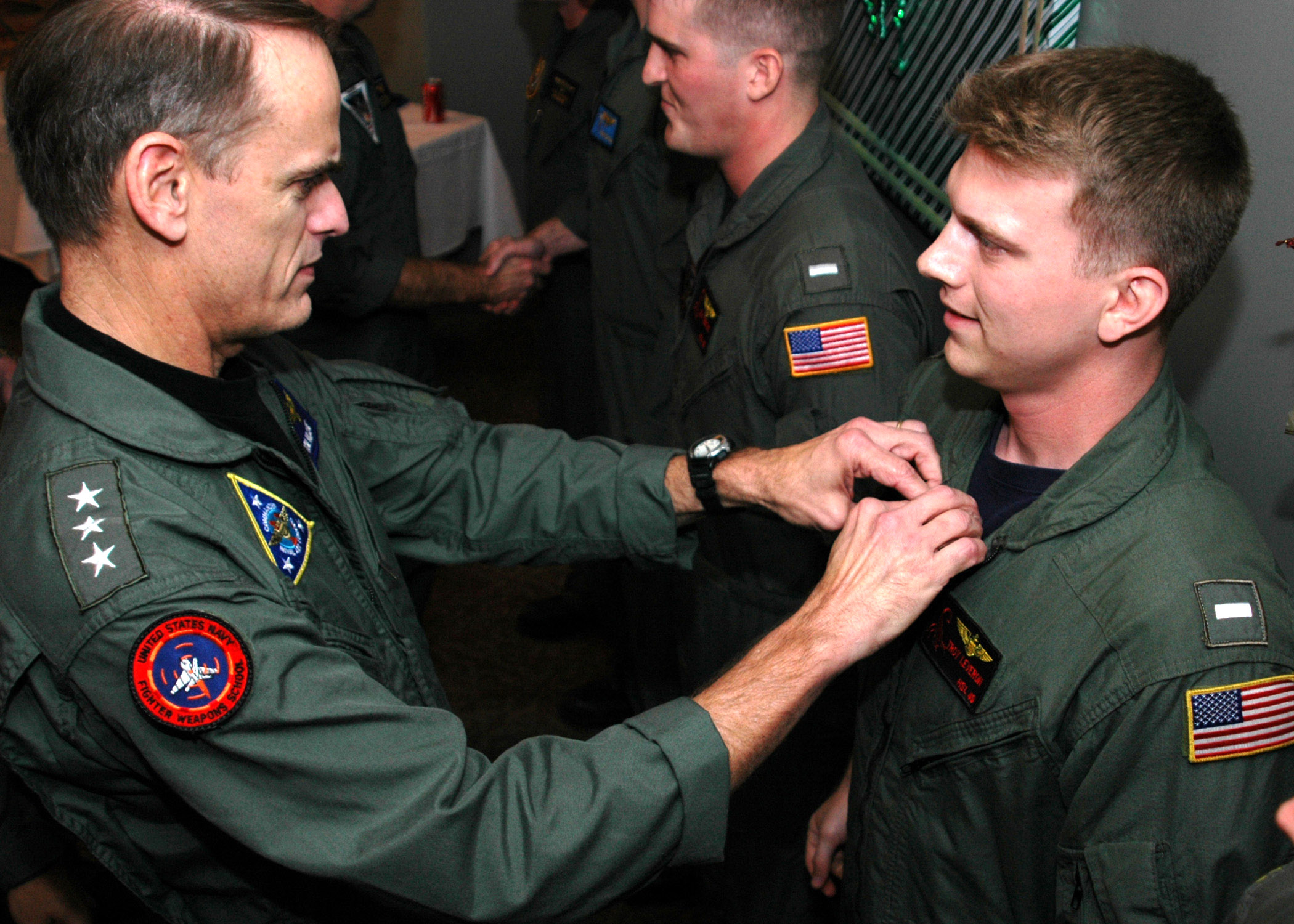
Kilcline places a squadron patch on Lieutenant Troy Leveran during a "Fleet Up" ceremony, December 2007

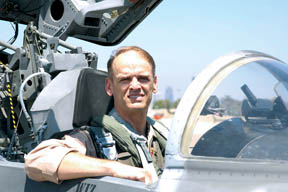
Kilcline sits in an F-5 prior to launching on an ACM sortie, October 2008

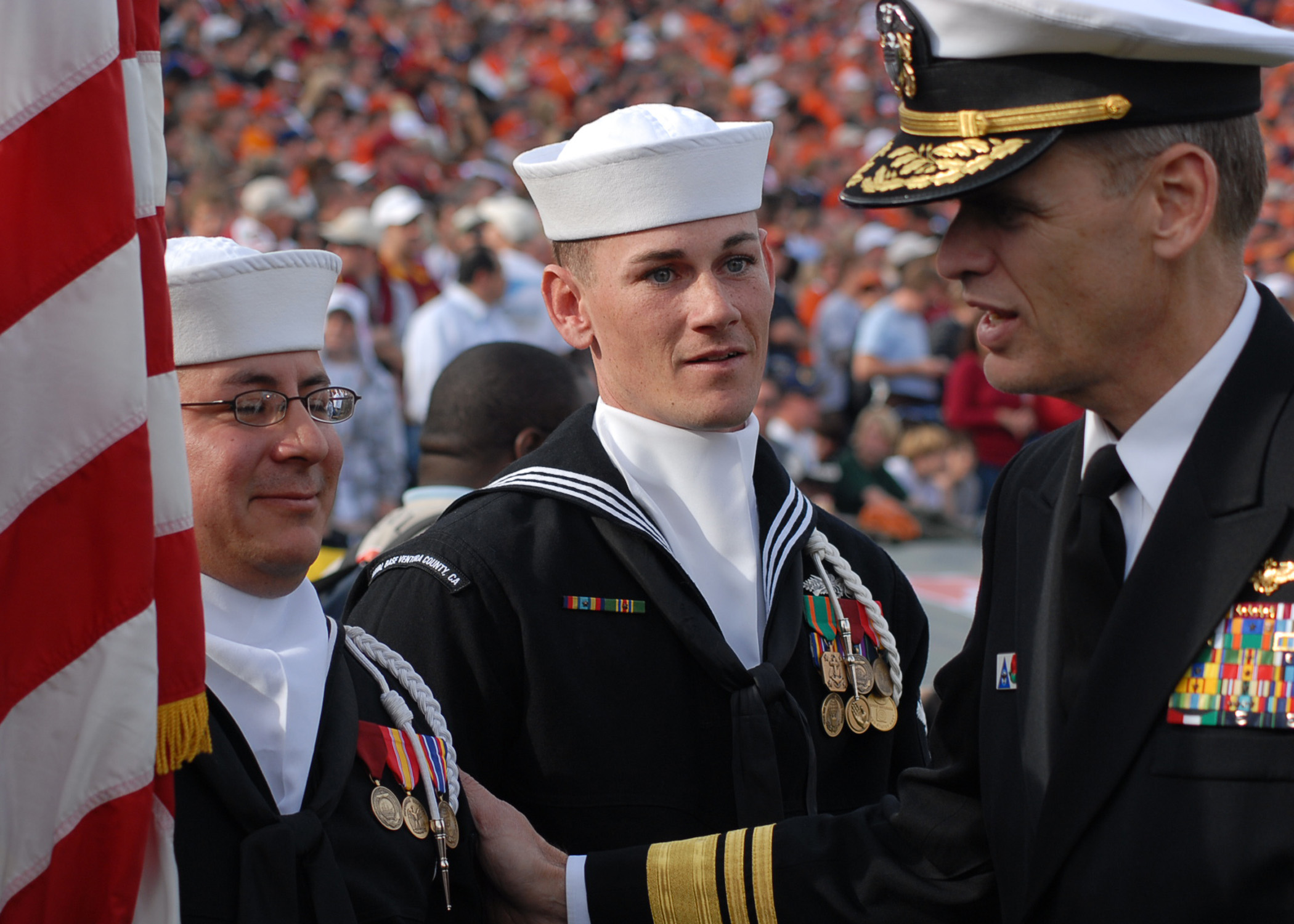
Kilcline thanking sailors of the Naval Base Ventura County Honor Guard for parading the colors at the 2008 Rose Bowl game

== Awards and decorations ==

Navy Distinguished Service Medal
Defense Superior Service Medal (2)
Legion of Merit (5)
Defense Meritorious Service Medal
Meritorious Service Medal
Air Medal (2) with bronze award numeral 2 (strike/flight awards)
Joint Service Commendation Medal
Navy and Marine Corps Commendation Medal (3)
Navy and Marine Corps Achievement Medal
Joint Meritorious Unit Award
Navy Unit Commendation Ribbon
Navy Meritorious Unit Commendation Ribbon (2)
Navy E Ribbon (2)
Navy Expeditionary Medal (2)
National Defense Service Medal (2)
Armed Forces Expeditionary Medal
Vietnam Service Medal (1 campaign star)
Southwest Asia Service Medal (2)
Global War on Terrorism Service Medal
Armed Forces Service Medal
Navy Sea Service Deployment Ribbon (5)
Navy Overseas Service Ribbon
Kuwait Liberation Medal (Kuwait)
Navy Expert Rifleman Medal
Navy Expert Pistol Shot Medal
