= VF-126 =

U.S. Navy military unit

Fighter Squadron 126
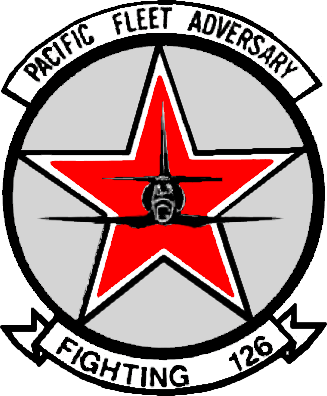
- Active: 6 April 1956 – 1 April 1994
- Country: United States
- Branch: United States Navy
- Part of: Inactive
- Nickname: Bandits
- Aircraft: FJ-4B Fury; A-4E/M TA-4J Skyhawk; T-2C Buckeye; F-5E Tiger II; F-16N Viper

Fighter Squadron 126 (VF-126) was an aggressor squadron of the U.S. Navy, and were known as the Fighting Seahawks, and after 1981 as the Bandits. The squadron was originally established as Attack Squadron 126 (VA-126) on 6 April 1956, it was redesignated VF-126 on 15 October 1965 and disestablished on 1 April 1994.

== Operational history ==
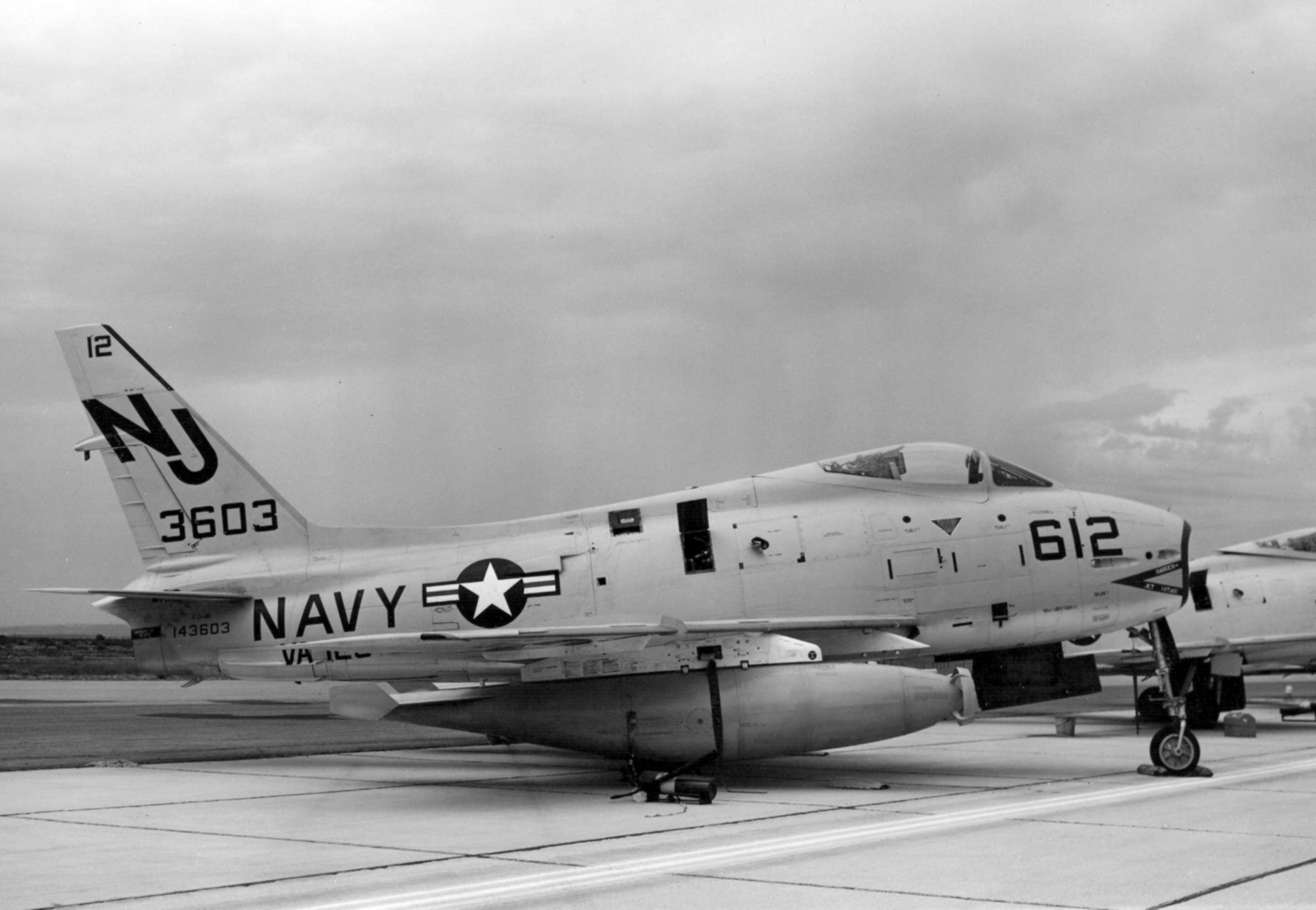
VA-126 FJ-4B Fury c.1960

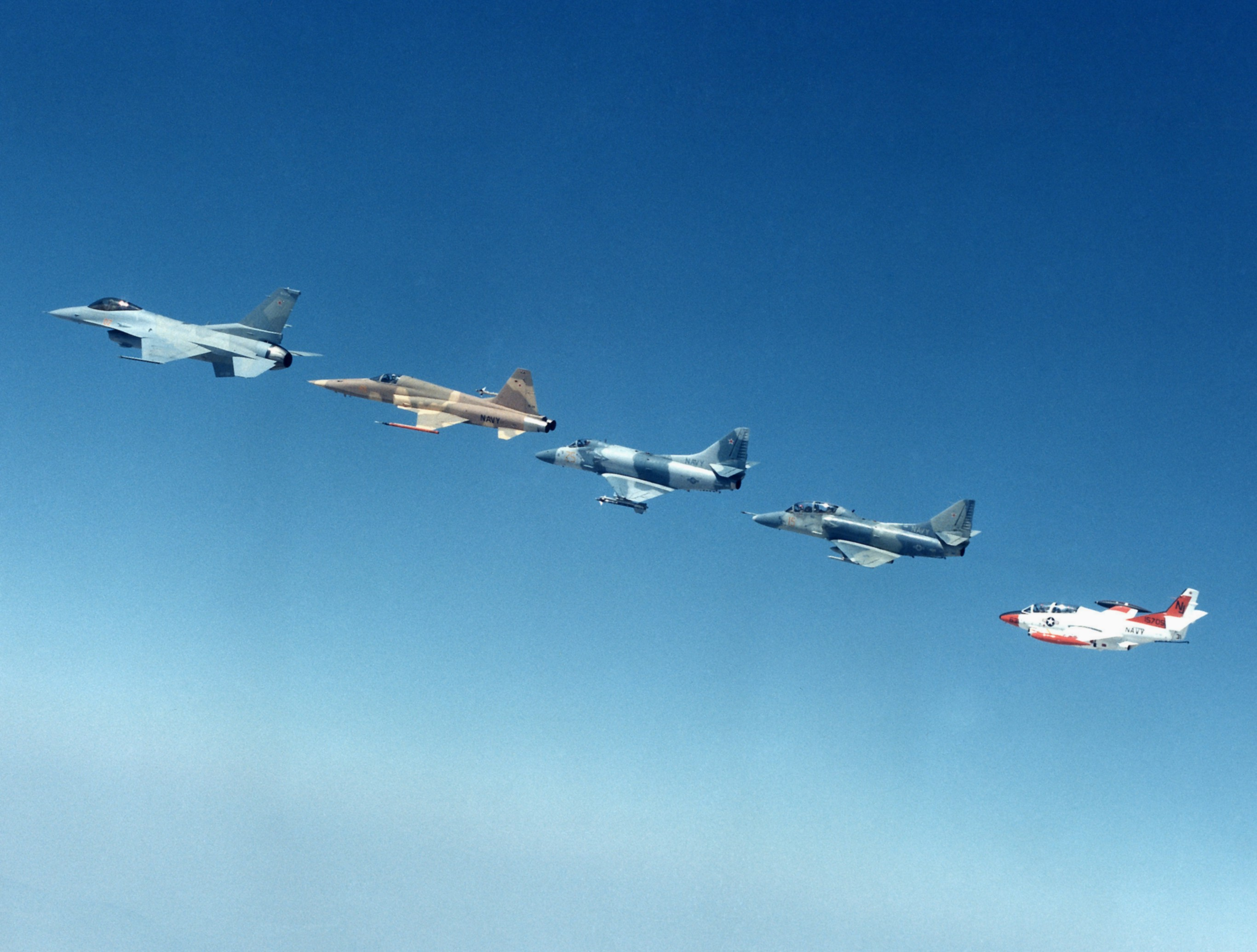
VF-126 F-16N, F-5E, A-4E, TA-4J and T-2C in 1987

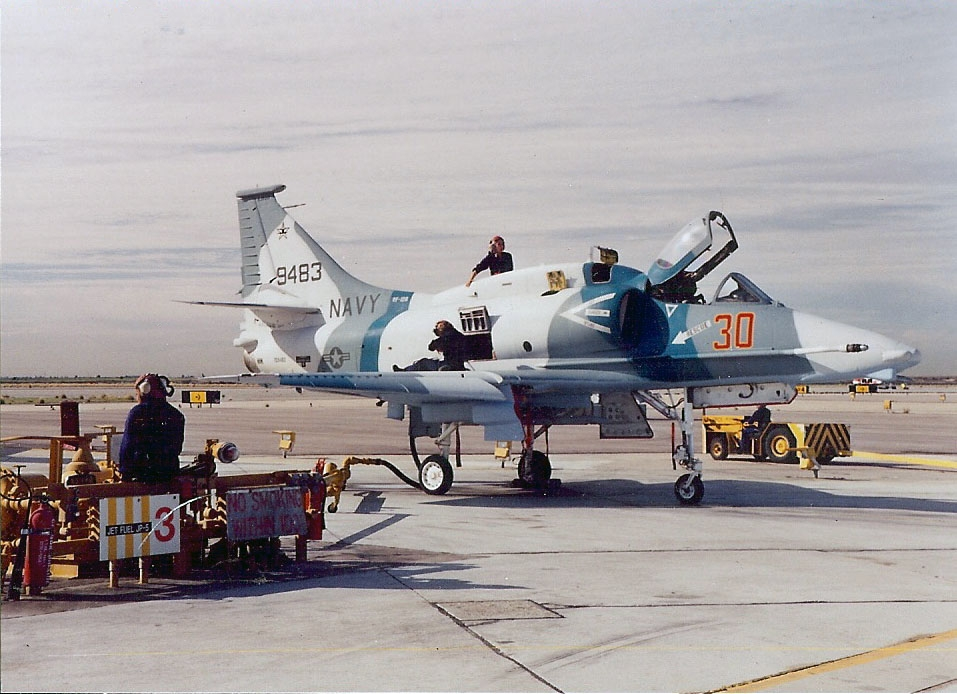
VF-126 A-4M at NAS Miramar c.1991

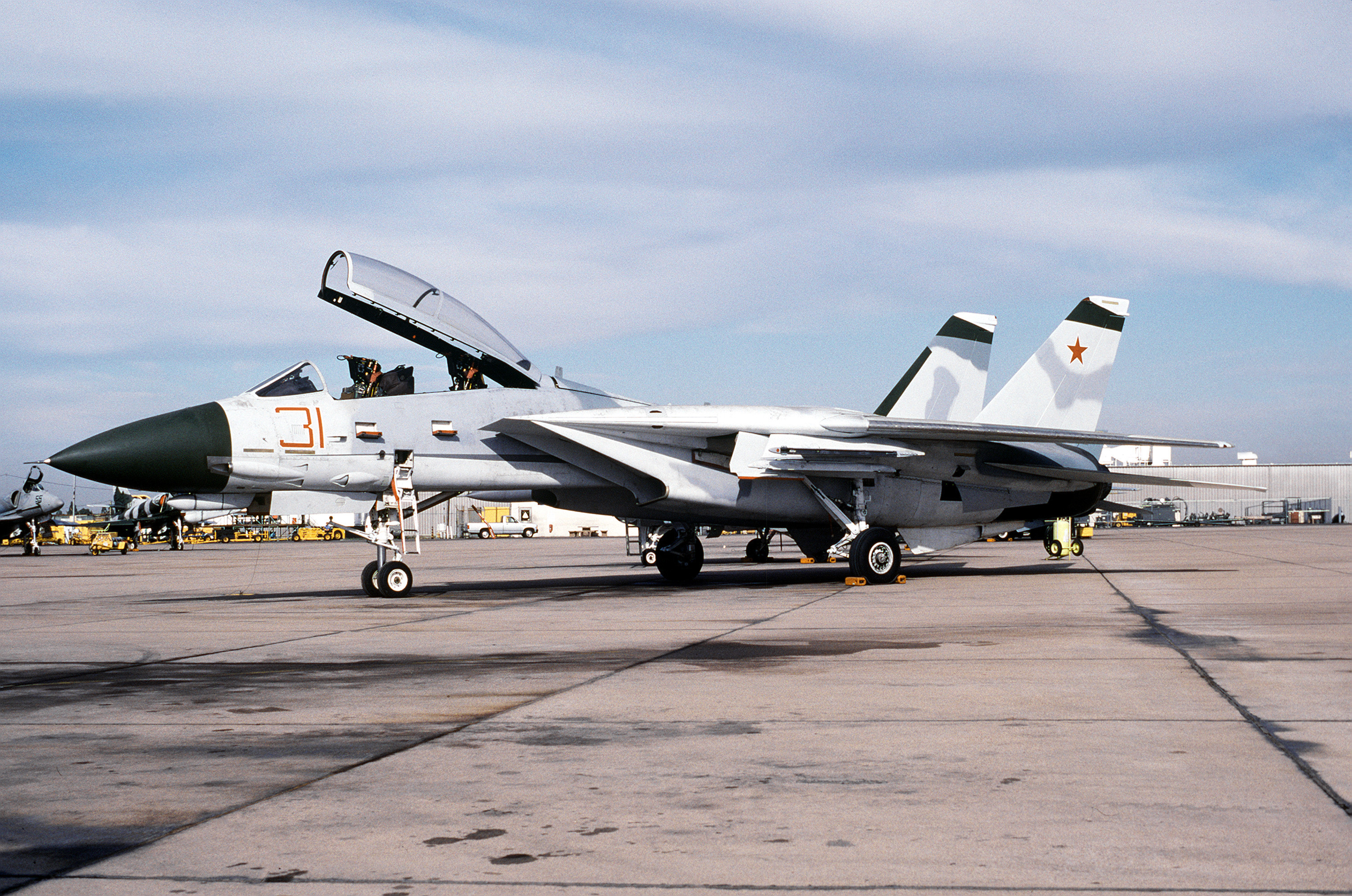
NFWS F-14A at NAS Miramar in 1991

VA-126 was a West Coast Fleet Replacement Squadron. With its redesignation as VF-126 it became a Navy aggressor squadron.

== Notable former members ==
- Gene Cernan
- Duke Cunningham
- Tom Kilcline Jr.

== Home port assignments ==
The squadron was assigned to these home ports:

- NAS Miramar

== Aircraft assignment ==
- FJ-4B Fury
- A-4E/M TA-4J Skyhawk
- T-2C Buckeye
- F-5E Tiger II
- F-16N Viper

== See also ==
- List of inactive United States Navy aircraft squadrons
- History of the United States Navy
