= HMH-462 =

Marine Heavy Helicopter Squadron 462
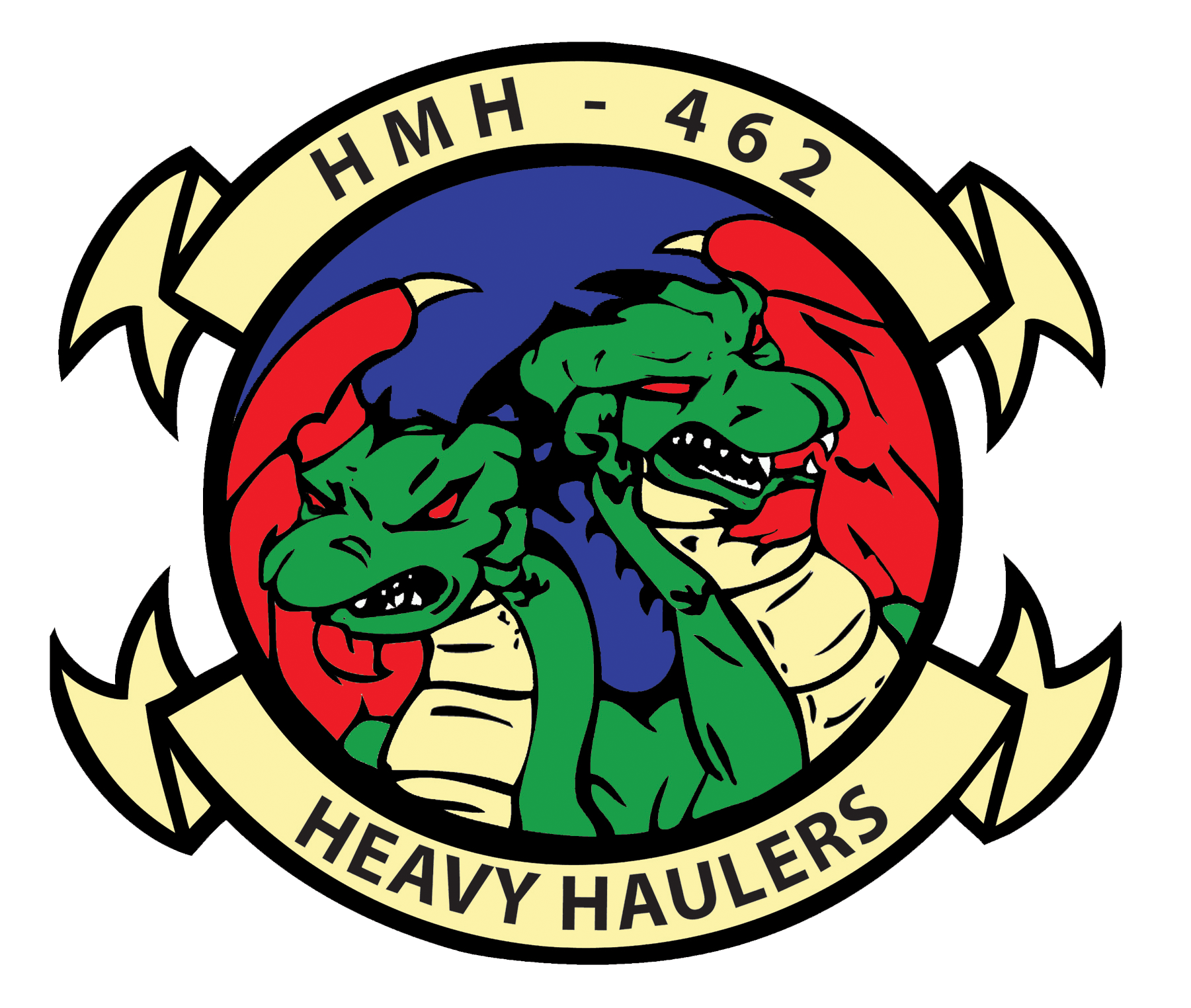
- HMH-462 Unit insignia
- Active: 15 April 1944 - 10 September 1945; 1 November 1957 - present
- Country: United States
- Branch: United States Marine Corps
- Type: Marine Heavy Helicopter Squadron
- Role: Assault support
- Part of: Marine Aircraft Group 16; 3rd Marine Aircraft Wing
- Garrison/HQ: Marine Corps Air Station Miramar
- Nicknames: "Heavy Haulers" "The Screw Crew"
- Tail Code: YF
- Engagements: Vietnam War; Operation Eagle Pull; Operation Frequent Wind; Operation Desert Storm; Operation Iraqi Freedom; 2003 invasion of Iraq

Marine Heavy Helicopter Squadron 462 (HMH-462) is a United States Marine Corps helicopter squadron operating CH-53E Super Stallion heavy transport helicopters. The squadron, known as the "Heavy Haulers", is based at Marine Corps Air Station Miramar in California and falls under the command of Marine Aircraft Group 16 (MAG-16) and the 3rd Marine Aircraft Wing (3rd MAW).

== History ==
=== World War II ===
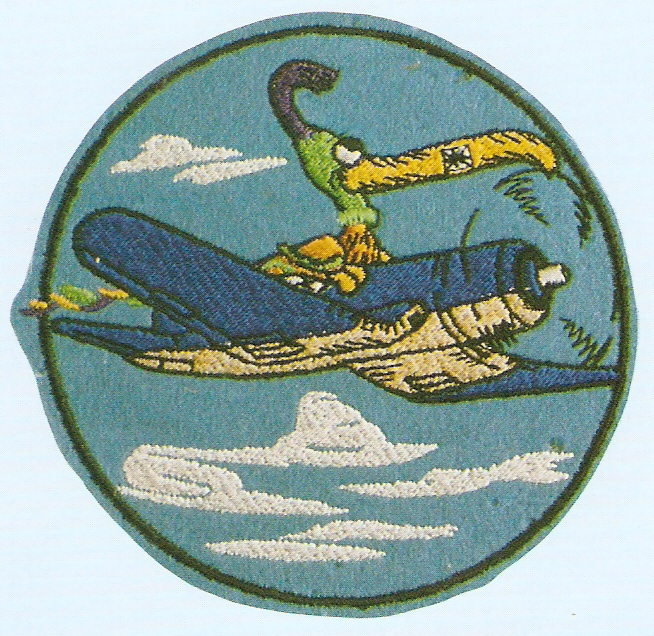
Squadrons logo during WWII when they were VMF-462

Marine Fighting Squadron 462 (VMF-462) was activated Marine Corps Air Station El Centro in California on 15 April 1944. On 10 October 1944 the squadron absorbed personnel and equipment from VMF-481 and they were redesignated a fighter pilot replacement training unit. The unit flew the Vought F4U-1 Corsair during this time. Shortly thereafter they transferred to Marine Corps Air Station El Toro and remained there until the end of the war. The squadron was quickly deactivated after the war's end on 10 September 1945.

=== 1950s and early 1960s ===
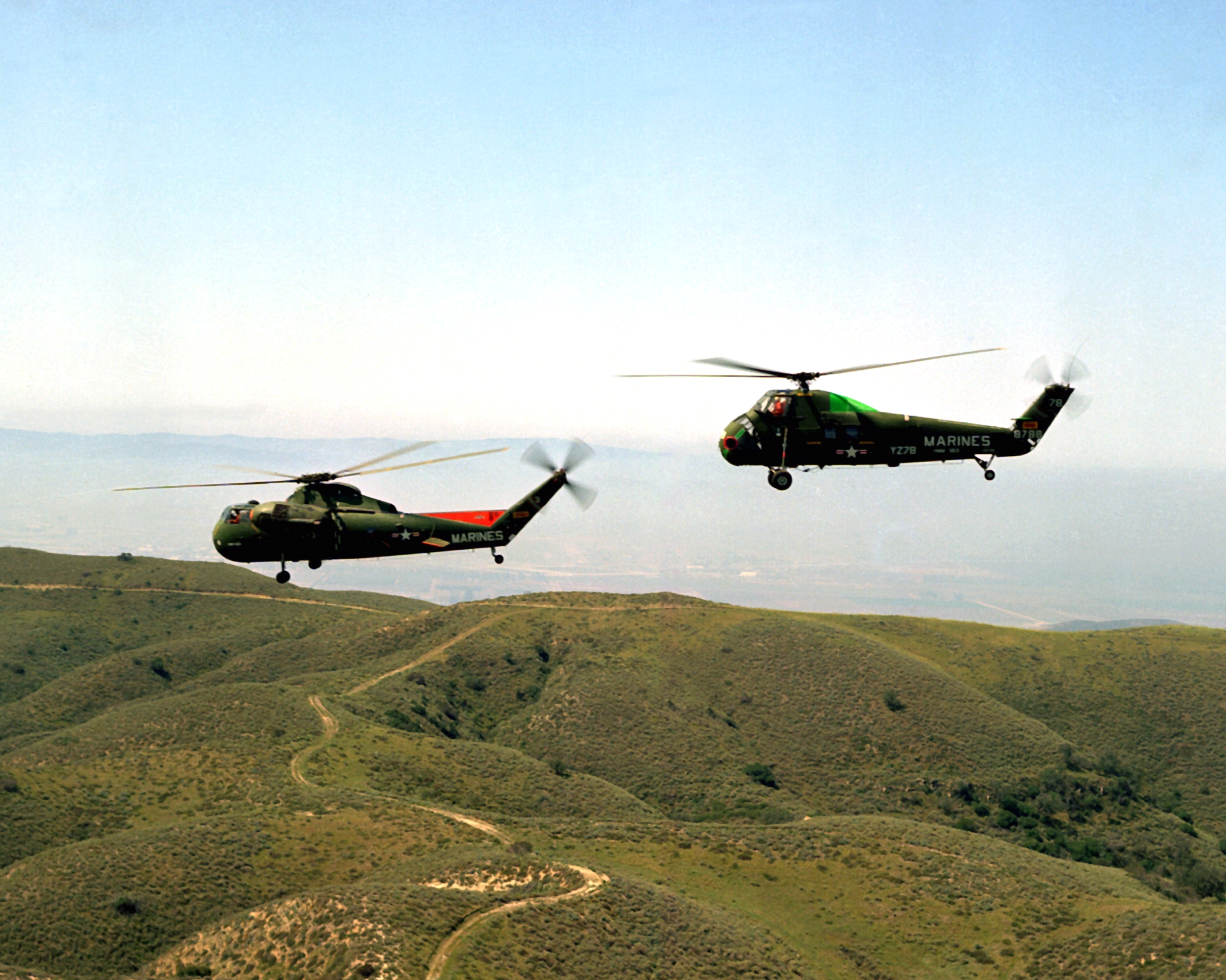
An HMR(M)-462 CH-37C with a UH-34D from HMM-363 near MCAS Tustin, 1964.

On 1 November 1957, 462 was reactivated at Marine Corps Air Facility Santa Ana as Marine Helicopter Transport Squadron (Medium) 462 HMR(M)-462. In March 1958 the squadron received the Sikorsky HR2S-1(CH-37 Mojave), known as the "Deuce." In July 1958 the squadron participated in NASA’s abort recovery tests of the Mercury space capsule in the Salton Sea. During July 1959 HMR(M)-462 worked with the United States Army in El Paso, Texas, to conduct the initial aerial transport tests of the Hawk missile system. One year later, the squadron worked with Convair Astronautics Corporation in San Diego to help construct Atlas missile silos. Also during 1960, HMR(M)-462 joined with the Federal Aviation Administration, Sikorsky Aircraft, the U.S. Army, New York Airways and British technical representatives of the Decca Corporation to establish Instrument Flight Procedures for helicopters. In June 1965 the squadron was once again decommissioned and placed in a cadre status as the Marine Corps awaited the arrival of the CH-53A "Sea Stallion."

=== Vietnam War ===
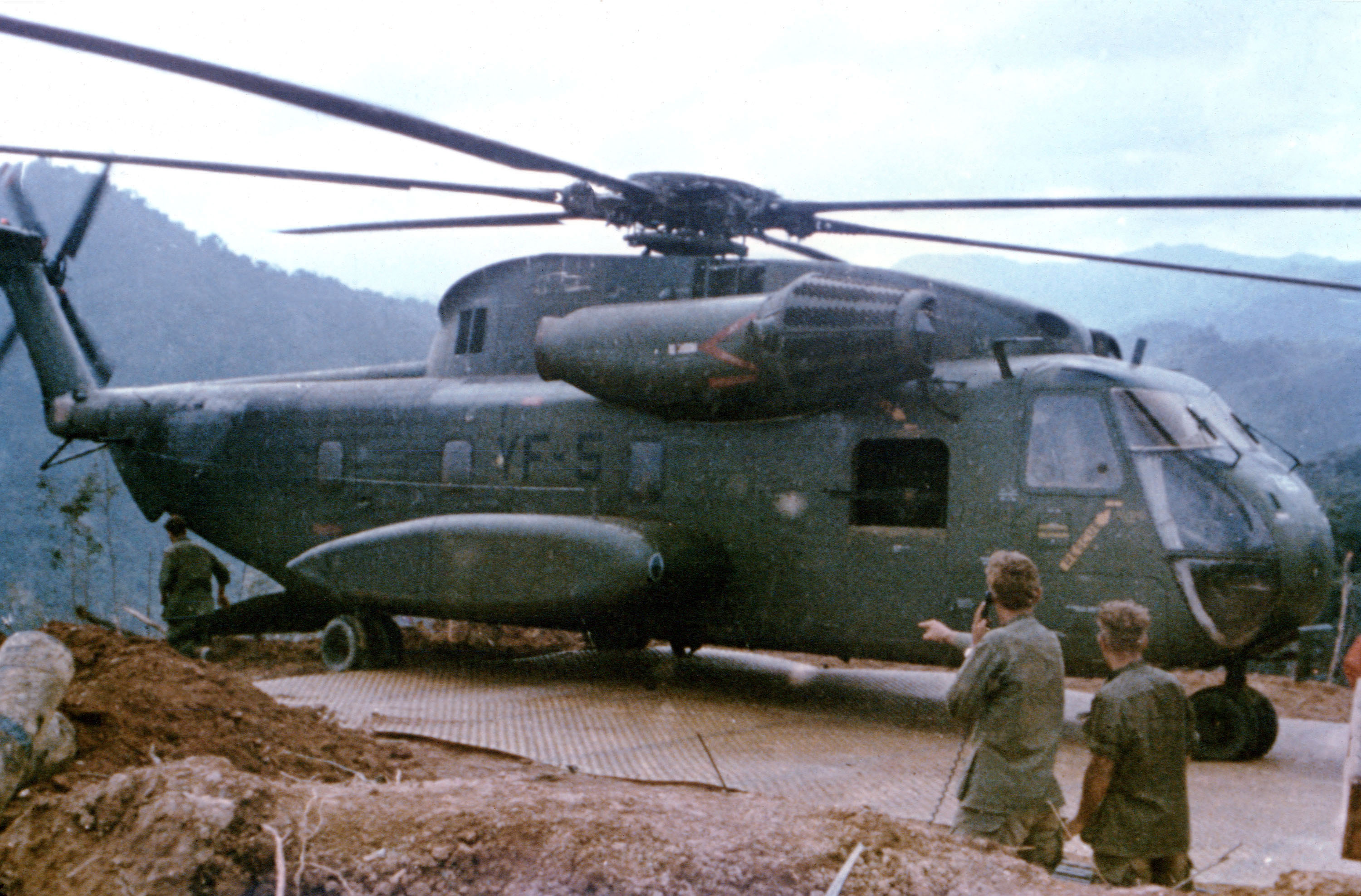
CH-53A from HMH-462 atop a mountain side base in Vietnam, July 1969

In August 1968, under the command of LtCol R.E. Nelson, the squadron deployed to South Vietnam for combat operations. Assigned to Marine Aircraft Group 36 at Phu Bai Combat Base, the squadron was tasked with supporting the 3rd Marine Division resupplying outlying Fire Support Bases (FSBs) and Helicopter Landing Zones (LZs), troop transport, medical evacuation, tactical aircraft recovery (TAR), Command and Control flights (C&C), and reconnaissance team insert/extracts. The squadron additionally provided support to U.S. Army units also attached to the 3rd Marine Division including 1st Brigade, 5th Infantry Division and the Army of the Republic of Vietnam (ARVN) 1st and 2nd Regiments.

Its primary area of operation was the northern I Corps Tactical Zone (ICTZ), the two northernmost Provinces of South Vietnam: Quảng Trị and Thừa Thiên, bordering the Vietnamese Demilitarized Zone (DMZ) on the north and the Laotian border to the west. However during mid-late 1969, HMH-462 was tasked with supporting the 1st Marine Division, in Quảng Nam and Quảng Tín Province; and the South Korean 2nd Marine Brigade on search and destroy operations in the vicinity of Go Noi Island and LZ-211, south of Da Nang, in Operation Victory Dragon.

The squadron participated in numerous named operations including: Meade River, Taylor Common, Dawson River, Dewey Canyon, Purple Martin, Maine Crag, Apache Snow, Cameron Falls, Herkimer Mountain, Utah Mesa (USMC/USA), Virginia Ridge, Georgia Tar, Arlington Canyon, Idaho Canyon, Ellis Ravine (USA), Massachusetts Bay (USA), Iroquois Grove (USA), Williams Glade (USMC/USA), Durham Peak, Pipestone Canyon and a series of ROK Marine operations, "Victory Dragon"

On 20 October 1969 as part of Operation Keystone Cardinal, HMH-462 departed from Phu Bai to the USS New Orleans for transport to Okinawa to provide support to Marine forces in Japan.

In 1975 HMH-462, still stationed in Okinawa, was assigned to the 9th MAB and 31st Marine Expeditionary Unit. On 12 April 1975 the squadron operating from USS Okinawa, participated in Operation Eagle Pull, the evacuation of Phnom Penh. Seventeen days later from 29–30 April, HMH-462 participated in Operation Frequent Wind, the evacuation of Saigon. Shortly thereafter, the squadron was embarked upon the USS Hancock and sailed back towards Cambodia to participate in the rescue operation of the SS Mayaguez. The Mayaguez rescue was completed before the Hancock arrived on station and the Hancock returned to Subic Bay.

=== Post-Vietnam and the 1990s ===
After nearly ten years of continuous overseas service, HMH-462 returned to California and relocated to Marine Corps Air Station Tustin, assigned to Marine Aircraft Group 16. They also participated in the Unit Deployment Program to MCAS Futenma in Okinawa. In December 1989, a squadron detachment was assigned to participate in coup contingency operations in the Republic of the Philippines as part of Marine Aircraft Group 90.

In August 1990, the "Heavy Haulers" were assigned to Marine Aircraft Group 70 and deployed to Jubail, Saudi Arabia, as part transport, MEDEVAC, VIP, and FARP support to MAG-70/16 and I Marine Expeditionary Force operations.

In February 1991, the squadron relocated within Saudi Arabia to Tanajib, where it provided support for Operation Desert Storm. Following the conclusion of hostilities, the squadron returned to MCAS Tustin. During March 1991, the squadron received the 1990 Chief of Naval Operations Safety Award. In September, the squadron reached another milestone when it completed 15,000 class A mishap free flight hours.

In 1992 it was also announced that HMH-462 had been selected for transition to the CH-53E Super Stallion. In June, the Heavy Haulers took possession of their first CH-53E Super Stallion and began the transition process.

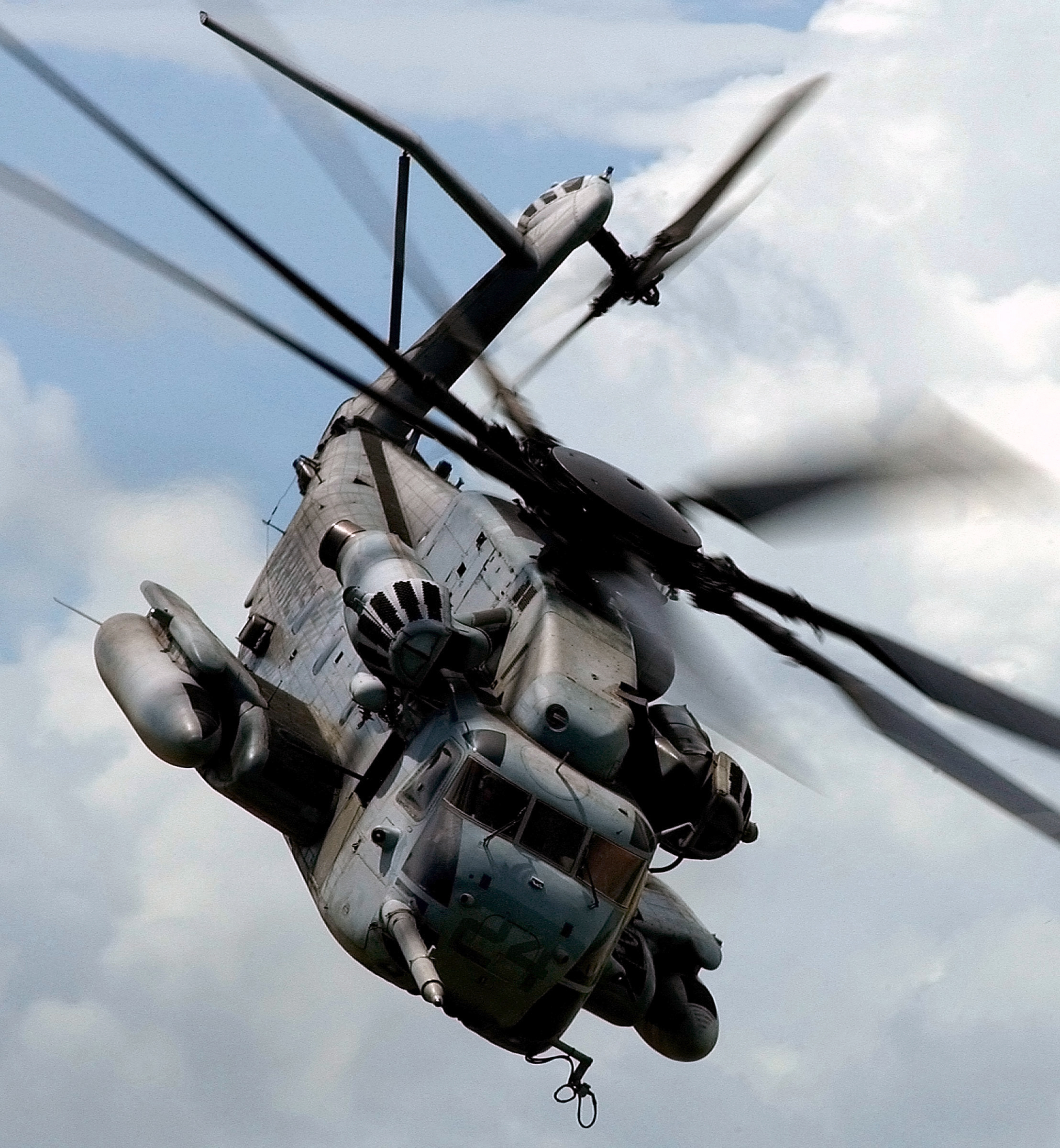
A HMH-462 CH-53E in 2002.

In 1996, the squadron reached another milestone when it completed 28,000 class A mishap free flight hours. In May of the same year, after completing another unit deployment to Okinawa, Japan. The "Heavy Haulers" received the Heavy Helicopter Squadron of the Year Award from the Marine Corps Aviation Association for 1996.

In March 1997, HMH-462 surpassed 30,000 class A mishap-free flight hours. After returning home in May 1998 from another unit deployment cycle. They became the first helicopter squadron in MAG-16 to make the transition from Tustin to MCAS Miramar. In December of the same year, HMH-462 surpassed yet another class A mishap free flight hour milestone of 35,000 hours and received the Heavy Helicopter Squadron of the Year award for 1998.

=== The Global War on Terror ===
HMH-462 served in Operation IRAQI FREEDOM (OIF) from February 2003 to September 2003 and Operation ENDURING FREEDOM (OEF) from September 2004 to May 2005. They flew many missions supporting logistics and combat missions involving insertion and extraction of special forces groups. In 2008, the squadron deployed in support of OIF and OEF. Following a short dwell time, the squadron deployed to Iraq in July 2009 in support of OIF and was retasked and transitioned to Afghanistan in support of OEF in November 2009. The squadron returned to CONUS at the end of January 2010.

Most recently, HMH-462 served with the 15th MEU in 2010 providing disaster relief in Pakistan and on the 31st MEU in 2011 providing disaster relief to Japan during Operation TOMODACHI. HMH-462 currently has detachments serving in Afghanistan supporting OEF and with the 11th MEU.

=== Proposed deactivation ===
Commandant Gen. David Berger released a news statement on the future of the USMC. In it he states that, "Developing a force that incorporates emerging technologies and a significant change to force structure within our current resource constraints will require the Marine Corps to become smaller and remove legacy capabilities." As part of this significant change to force structure, in May 2020 the USMC reorganization plan proposed the squadron to be deactivated in 2022. However the proposed reorganization plan was changed to deactivate HMH-463 at MCAS Kaneohe Bay after a detailed cost analysis provided by HQMC Aviation.

== See also ==
- United States Marine Corps Aviation
- Organization of the United States Marine Corps
- List of active United States Marine Corps aircraft squadrons
