= Wilbur F. Simlik =

American Marine Corps Major General

Wilbur Frank Simlik
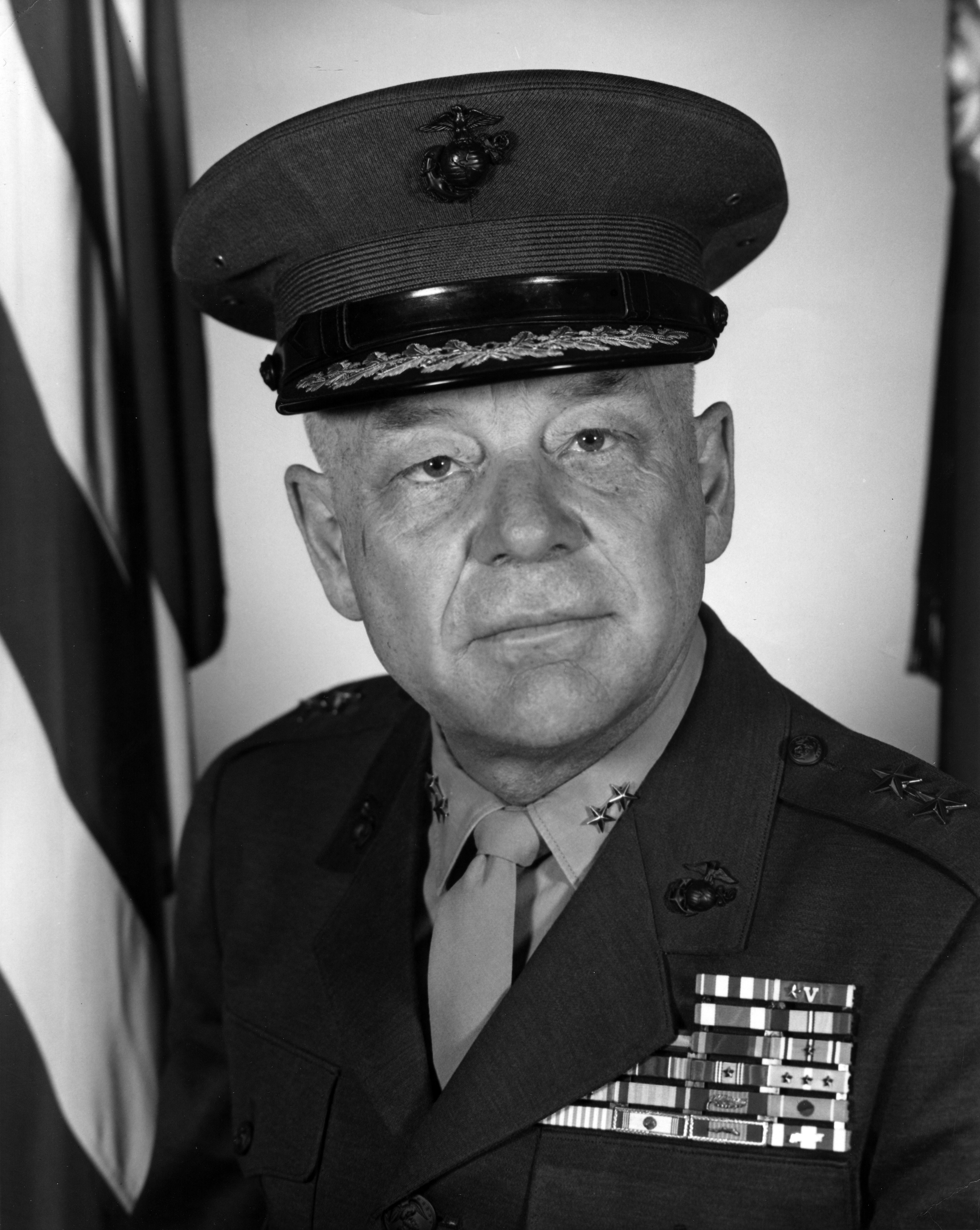
- MG Wilbur F. Simlik, USMC
- Born: June 19, 1921; Youngstown, Ohio, U.S.
- Died: February 12, 2014 (aged 92); Fullerton, California, U.S.
- Burial place: Fort Rosecrans National Cemetery
- Military career
- Allegiance: United States of America
- Branch: United States Marine Corps
- Service years: 1942–1975
- Rank: Major general
- Service number: 0-31092
- Commands: Fiscal Director of the Marine Corps; 3rd Marine Regiment
- Conflicts: World War II: Battle of Iwo Jima; Korean War: Battle for Outpost Vegas; Battle of the Samichon River; Vietnam War: Operation Virginia Ridge; Operation Idaho Canyon
- Awards: Silver Star; Legion of Merit (3); Meritorious Service Medal

Wilbur Frank Simlik (June 19, 1921 – February 12, 2014) was a highly decorated major general in the United States Marine Corps. A veteran of World War II, he distinguished himself as platoon leader of the 3rd Battalion, 25th Marines, during the Iwo Jima campaign and received the Silver Star for bravery. Simlik remained in the Marine Corps Reserve following the war, but was recalled to active duty during the Korean War and distinguished himself again as rifle company commander.

During the Vietnam War, Simlik commanded the 3rd Marine Regiment and rose to the rank of general. He completed his service as fiscal director of the Marine Corps in September 1975.

== Early career ==
Simlik was born on June 19, 1921, in Youngstown, Ohio, to Frank Simlik and Marie Lind. Following graduation from South High School in Youngstown in mid-1939, he enrolled at Muskingum College in New Concord, Ohio, and graduated with a Bachelor of Arts degree in June 1943. While at the university, he enlisted in the Marine Corps Reserve in December 1942 and completed five weeks of recruit training as a private first class at Marine Corps Recruit Depot Parris Island, South Carolina.

He was subsequently ordered to the Marine Corps Schools Quantico, Virginia, where he completed Reserve Officers Candidate Course and was commissioned reserve second lieutenant on October 6, 1943. Simlik then served one year as guard officer at Naval Ammunition Depot, Oahu, Hawaii, before joining the 25th Marine Regiment, 4th Marine Division under Major General Clifton B. Cates. The Fourth Division was stationed at Maui, Hawaii, after heavy combat in the Mariana Islands. He was meanwhile promoted to the rank of first lieutenant.

Simlik was attached to Company L, 3rd Battalion under Lieutenant Colonel Justice M. Chambers and spent the following weeks in training. The Fourth Division embarked for Iwo Jima, Bonin Islands during January 1945 with the goal of capturing the entire island, including the three Japanese-controlled airfields to provide a staging area for attacks on the Japanese main islands. He went ashore on February 26, 1945, as replacement officer and assumed command of the rifle platoon within his company. Simlik led his company during the two weeks of heavy fighting, and, when his commanding officer was wounded and evacuated on March 9, he assumed command of the company and, during an attack south from Minami Village, led his company through devastating hostile fire to destroy a series of cave positions from which the Japanese had harassed the attacking elements. For his exemplary service and gallantry in action during the Iwo Jima campaign, Simlik was decorated with the Silver Star.

== Postwar service ==
=== Korean War ===
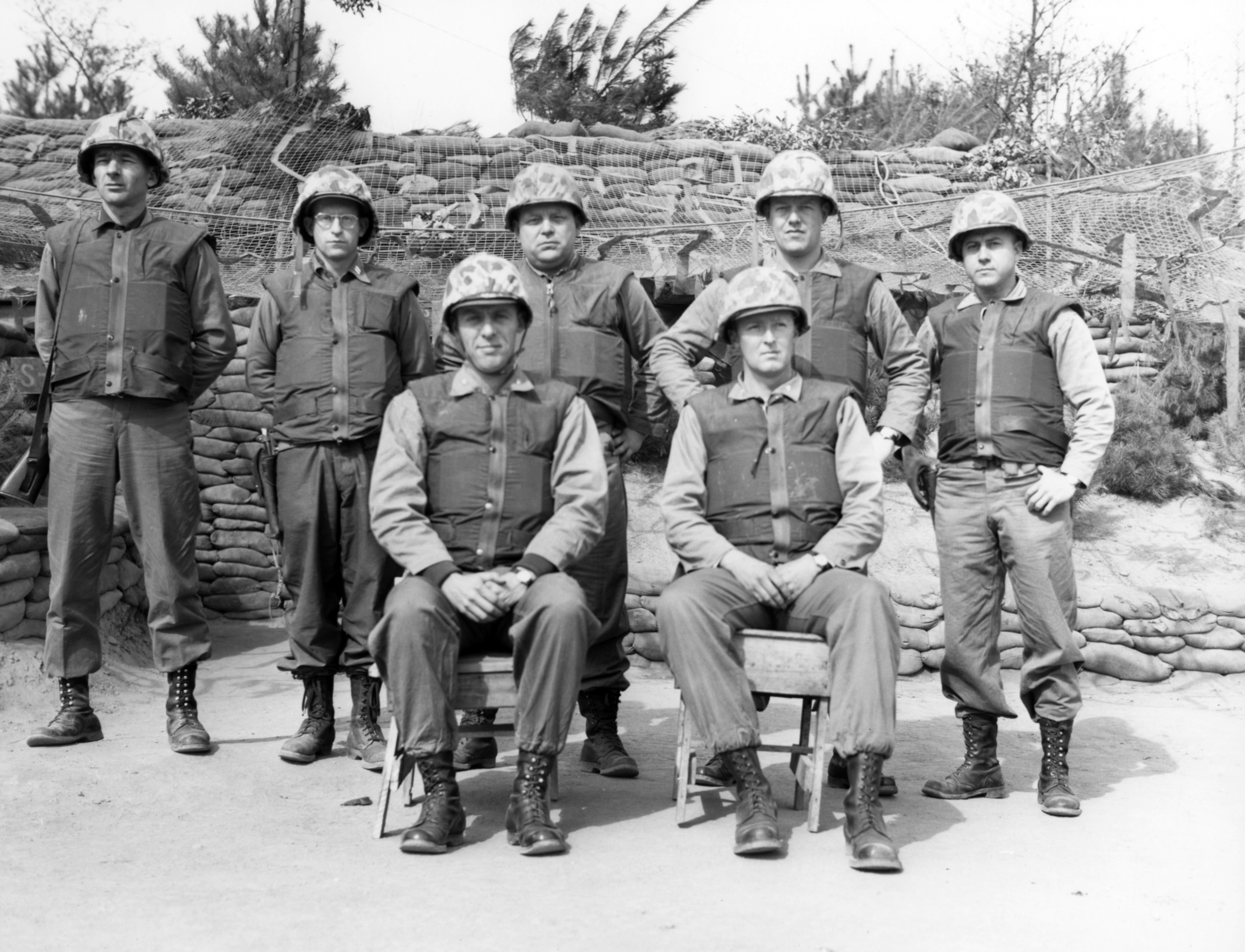
Captain Simlik (standing in the middle, back row) as battalion operations officer of 1st Battalion, 5th Marines with the officer group of his battalion at Chajang-ni, Korea.

Simlik returned to the United States in December 1945 and was released to inactive duty. He entered the University of Chicago and graduated with a Master's degree in business administration in May 1948. Simlik also remained in the Marine Corps Reserve and was promoted to the rank of captain in January 1950.

He was recalled to active duty in January 1952 and ordered to the Amphibious School at Marine Corps Schools, Quantico, which he completed in June of that year. Simlik then sailed for South Korea and joined the 1st Battalion, 5th Marine Regiment part of the 1st Marine Division on the Main line of resistance (MLR) in western Korea and tasked with the defense of "Nevada Cities" – systems of bunkers and outposts on the MLR, which oversaw the enemy's rear.

Simlik served as rifle company commander under Lieutenant Colonel Jonas M. Platt and later assumed duty as battalion operations officer. He remained in that capacity until July 1953, when the Armistice was signed and then returned to the United States. For his service in Korea, Simlik was decorated with the Legion of Merit with Combat "V".

=== 1953-1969 ===
Following his return to the United States at the end of July, Simlik remained on active service and was appointed officer-in-charge, Marine Corps Recruiting Station in Portland, Oregon. While in this capacity, he was promoted to the rank of major in December 1954 and held that command until August 1956, when he rejoined the 1st Marine Division at Camp Pendleton, California.

Simlik served as executive officer of the 2nd Battalion, 7th Marine Regiment, for one year, before he was ordered for the Army Atomic Employment Course at Army Command and Staff College at Fort Leavenworth, Kansas. Upon completion of the course, he served as 1st Marine Division's assistant operations officer with additional duty as atomic weapons employment officer under Major General David M. Shoup.

He left the headquarters of 1st Marine Division in August 1958 and was ordered to the Naval Postgraduate Management School in Monterey, California. Simlik graduated in January 1959 and assumed duty as special projects officer, Analysis and Review Branch, Fiscal Division, at Headquarters Marine Corps and was promoted to the rank of lieutenant colonel in July 1960.

Simlik was ordered to Quantico in August 1962, where he attended Command and Staff College, graduating in August of the following year. He subsequently remained there as an instructor in the Supporting Arms Branch for brief period, before sailing for Okinawa, Japan for duty with the 3rd Marine Division under Major General James M. Masters Sr.

He served as divisional assistant operations and training officer until August 1964, when he was ordered to Naples, Italy, for duty as commanding officer of Marine barracks at Naval Supply Activity there. Simlik was promoted to the rank of colonel in January 1966 and ordered back to the United States in order to attend the Naval War College at Newport, Rhode Island, in August of that year.

Simlik graduated in June of the following year and assumed duty again at Headquarters Marine Corps as head, Enlisted Assignment Section, Assignment and Classification Branch, Personnel Department under Major General Herman Nickerson Jr. While in this capacity, he was decorated with the newly established Meritorious Service Medal.

=== Vietnam War ===
Simlik assumed command of the 3rd Marine Regiment on 28 June 1969 and ordered to South Vietnam. 3rd Marines was part of 3rd Marine Division, which was engaged in Operation Virginia Ridge near the Vietnam Demilitarized Zone (DMZ). The operation was focused on destroying two People's Army of Vietnam (PAVN) regiments, and Simlik assumed command on June 28, 1969, when the PAVN activity was winding down. The regiment was then tasked with search operations throughout the area of operations.

Operation Virginia Ridge concluded on July 16, 1969, and was followed by Operation Idaho Canyon, during which Simlik directed search and destroy operations against PAVN units along the DMZ north of Fire Support Base Fuller and Khe Gio Bridge. PAVN activity within the area of operations was light at the beginning, consisting of sporadic rocket attacks against Marine installations, sniper contacts, and attempts at interdicting Routes 9 and 561 with mines and other surprise firing devices. Small groups of the PAVN 9th Regiment infiltrated the DMZ and moved south, but during the beginning of August 1969, the PAVN changed tactics and Simlik's Marines began facing well-equipped, well-trained units of battalion size. Operation Idaho Canyon lasted until the end of September that year, and Simlik's 3rd Marines counted 563 PAVN killed and 201 weapons captured.

In addition to combat operations, Simlik had to face another problem: how to maintain fighting morale within his troops. In early June, President Richard Nixon had suggested that a decision on future withdrawals would be made in August or shortly thereafter. Although there was an information embargo at the headquarters of 3rd Marine Division, and commanding general William K. Jones did not want to inform his subordinate units about withdrawal, some information leaked to divisional regimental commanders, including Simlik. Now due to the withdrawal information, nobody wanted to be the last man killed in battle and the situation was worsened by journalists, who segregated some black Marines and asked them suggestive questions if they did more than your share. This eventually planted seeds of discontent which erupted in violence in the rear areas, resulting in the murder of one Marine. During the last week of September, the 3rd Marines were moved to Đông Hà Combat Base and then departed for the United States. Simlik relinquished command of 3rd Marines on 1 September 1969. Simlik then served for one month as deputy chief of staff, 3rd Marine Division, under Major General William K. Jones. But his tour of duty in South Vietnam was not finished, and he was subsequently ordered to Da Nang, where he joined the headquarters, III Marine Amphibious Force under Lieutenant General Herman Nickerson Jr. as assistant chief of staff for logistics (G-4). While in this capacity, he participated in the communication with the headquarters of Fleet Marine Force, Pacific under Lieutenant General Henry W. Buse Jr. and was responsible for the coordination of redeployment of Marine Corps units during the withdrawal to the United States and other Pacific bases. Simlik remained in that capacity until the beginning of June 1970, when he was ordered back to the United States under rotation policy.

For his service in Vietnam, Simlik received his second Legion of Merit with Combat "V", Armed Force Honor Medal, 1st Class, Gallantry Cross with Palm by the Government of South Vietnam and Order of Military Merit "Hwarang" by South Korea for cooperation with the Korean Marine Corps.

=== 1970-1975 ===
Simlik returned to the United States in July 1970 and was promoted to the rank of brigadier general. As general officer, his first assignment was deputy assistant chief of staff for logistics at Headquarters Marine Corps under Major General Herman Poggemeyer Jr., serving in that capacity until August 1972. He was co-responsible for the planning of budget for logistics for all Marine forces and its advocacy before the congressional committee on appropriations until August 1972, when he was transferred to the headquarters, Marine Corps Development and Education Command, Quantico, and served under Lieutenant General Robert P. Keller as deputy for education/director of education center.

Following his promotion to major general on May 7, 1974, he assumed duties as fiscal director of the Marine Corps at the Headquarters Marine Corps and served in this capacity for a year and a half. Simlik was placed on the retired list on September 1, 1975, but was returned to active duty without interruption of service to continue as fiscal director until November 15, 1975. He was awarded a gold star in lieu of a third award of the Legion of Merit upon termination of active service.

== Retirement ==
Following his retirement from the Marines, Simlik settled in Vista, California, and was active in Boys & Girls Club of Vista, where he served on boards of directors for over 25 years. He was also involved in the farmer growing, harvesting and selling macadamia nuts and was a member of the Macadamia Society.

Simlik was a member of Rotary Club of Vista and was active in the Marine Corps Historical Foundation, where he received a certificate of appreciation by Commandant Robert H. Barrow for his contributions to the Oral History Program. In 1990, the Muskingum College Alumni Association bestowed on him its highest honor, the Alumni Distinguished Service Award.

Following the death of his first wife, Ethel Blomquist, in 2000, Simlik married widow Pearl Van Berkom. They moved to Fullerton, California, where Simlik died on February 12, 2014, aged 92. He was buried at Fort Rosecrans National Cemetery in San Diego.

== Decorations ==
A complete list of the general's medals and decorations include:

1st Row	Silver Star		Legion of Merit with Combat "V" with two 5/16" Gold Stars	
2nd Row	Meritorious Service Medal	Combat Action Ribbon	Navy Presidential Unit Citation	Navy Unit Commendation
3rd Row	Asiatic-Pacific Campaign Medal with one 3/16 inch bronze service star	World War II Victory Medal	National Defense Service Medal with one star	Korean Service Medal with three 3/16 inch bronze service stars
4th Row	Vietnam Service Medal with two 3/16 inch bronze service stars	Korean Order of Military Merit "Hwarang"	Vietnam Armed Forces Honor Medal, 1st Class	Vietnam Gallantry Cross with Palm
5th Row	United Nations Korea Medal	Republic of Korea Presidential Unit Citation	Vietnam Gallantry Cross Unit Citation with Palm	Vietnam Campaign Medal
