= Bruce W. Carter =

United States Marine Corps Medal of Honor recipient

Bruce Wayne Carter
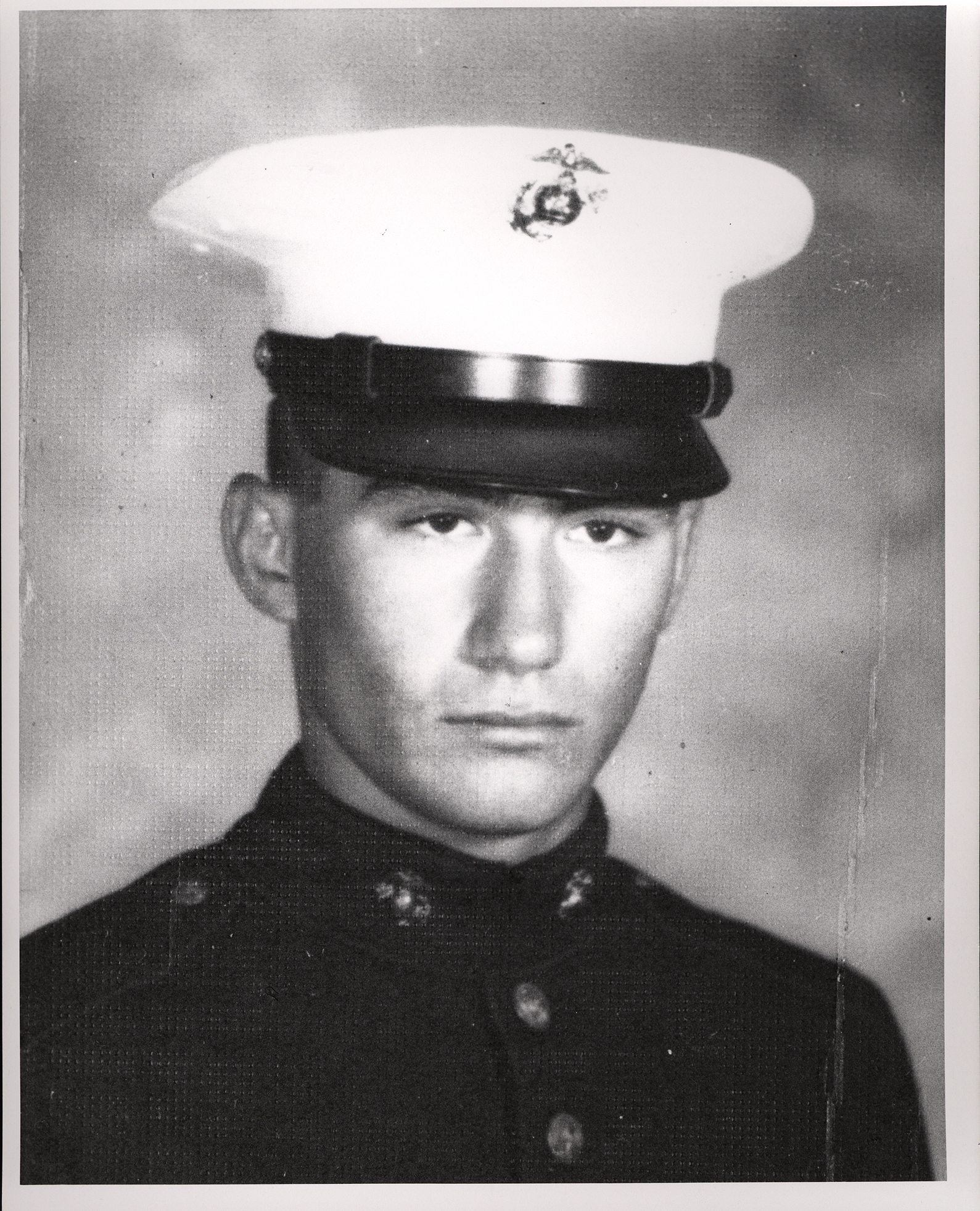
- Bruce W. Carter, Medal of Honor recipient
- Born: May 7, 1950; Schenectady, New York, US
- Died: August 7, 1969 (aged 19) near Vandegrift Combat Base, South Vietnam
- Burial place: Arlington National Cemetery
- Military career
- Allegiance: United States
- Branch: United States Marine Corps
- Service years: 1968–1969
- Rank: Private First Class
- Units: Company H, 2nd Battalion, 3rd Marines, 3rd Marine Division
- Conflicts: Vietnam War: Operation Idaho Canyon †
- Awards: Medal of Honor (1969); Purple Heart

Bruce Wayne Carter (May 7, 1950 – August 7, 1969) was a United States Marine who was killed in action during the Vietnam War. He posthumously received the Medal of Honor for his heroism.

In August 1969, his unit was ambushed outside of Vandegrift Combat Base in Quang Tri Province. Carter had stopped the enemy's advance when a grenade landed between him and his fellow Marines – Carter threw himself on the grenade, sacrificing his life to save the lives of others.

== Biography ==
Carter was born May 7, 1950, in Schenectady, New York. He received his early schooling at Queens Elementary School in Pasadena, Texas. From September 1959 until January 1960, Carter attended Gretna Park Elementary School in Gretna, Louisiana, and graduated from Mimosa Park Elementary School, Mimosa Park, Louisiana, in May 1962.

Carter's education continued in Hialeah, Florida, where he attended Filer Junior High and Hialeah Junior High. Carter then attended Miami Springs Junior and High Schools (Florida), prior to entering West Jefferson High School in Harvey, Louisiana.

Carter left West Jefferson in June 1968 to enlist in the U.S. Marine Corps at Jacksonville, Florida, on August 12, 1968. Ordered to the Marine Corps Recruit Depot Parris Island, South Carolina, he completed recruit training with the 3rd Recruit Training Battalion in October 1968, and individual combat training with the 1st Infantry Training Battalion at the Marine Corps Base, Camp Lejeune, North Carolina, the following December. Promoted to private first class, January 1, 1969, Carter attended the Vietnamese Language Course at Monterey, California, until March.

Ordered to the Republic of Vietnam in April 1969, Carter served as a radio operator/radio man with Company H, 2nd Battalion, 3rd Marines, 3rd Marine Division.

On August 7, 1969, while participating in Operation Idaho Canyon north of Vandegrift Combat Base, Quang Tri Province, PFC Carter's unit was maneuvering against the enemy and came under a heavy fire from a numerically superior hostile force. The lead element soon became separated from the main body of the squad by a brush fire. PFC Carter and his fellow marines were pinned down by vicious crossfire when, with complete disregard for his safety, Carter stood in full view of the North Vietnamese Army soldiers to deliver a devastating volume of fire at their positions. The accuracy and aggressiveness of his attack caused several enemy casualties and forced the remainder of the soldiers to retreat from the immediate area. Shouting directions to the marines around PFC Carter, he then commenced leading them from the path of the rapidly approaching brush fire when he observed a hostile grenade land between him and his companions. Fully aware of the probable consequences of his action but determined to protect the men following him, PFC Carter unhesitatingly threw himself over the grenade, absorbing the full effects of its detonation with his body.

== Decorations ==
Carter's medals and decorations include: the Medal of Honor (posthumously), the Purple Heart, the Combat Action Ribbon, the National Defense Service Medal, the Vietnam Service Medal with one bronze star, and the Republic of Vietnam Campaign Medal.

| Medal of Honor | Purple Heart | Combat Action Ribbon |
| National Defense Service Medal | Vietnam Service Medal with 1 bronze star | Vietnam Campaign Medal |

== Medal of Honor citation ==
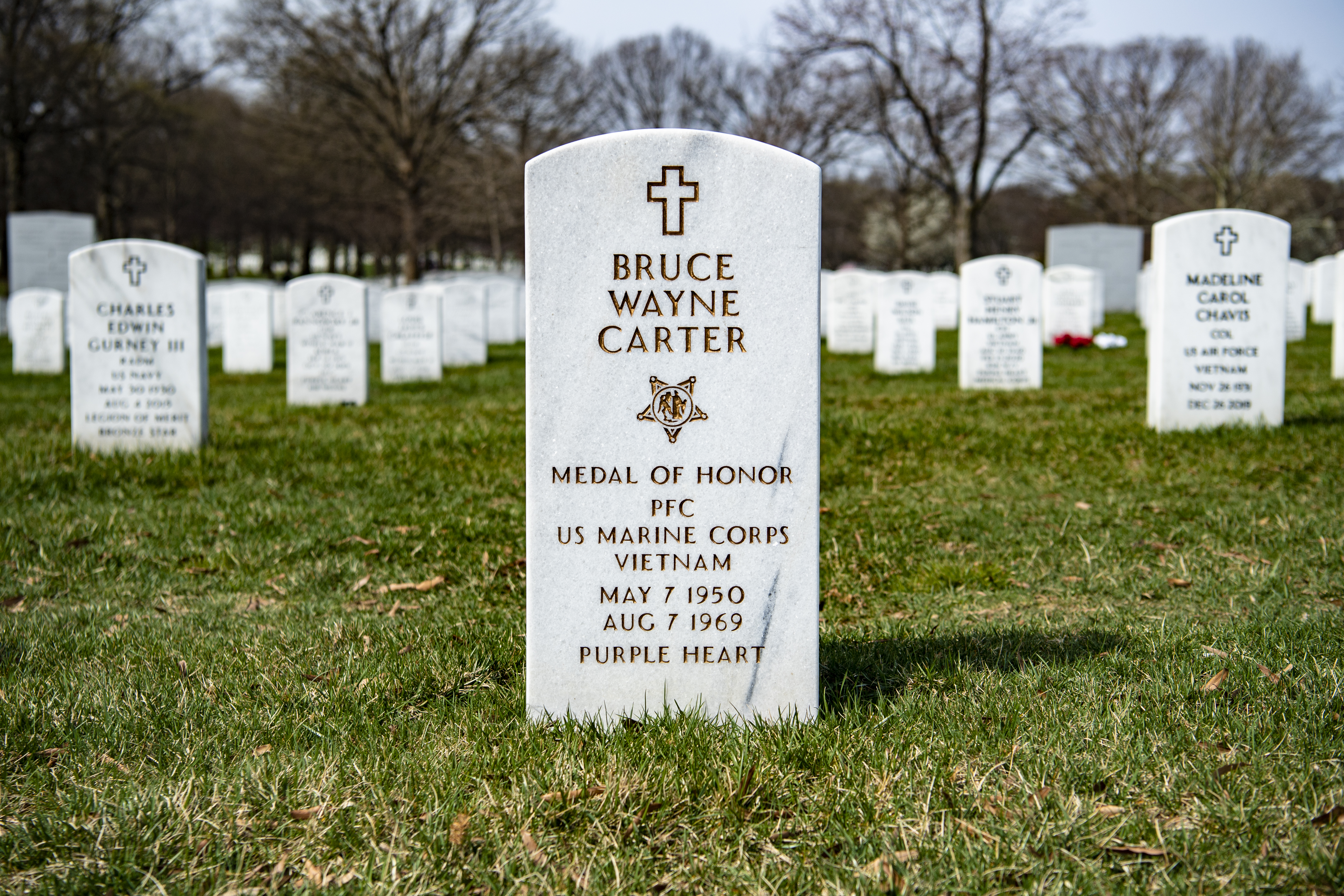
Grave of Bruce W. Carter at Arlington National Cemetery

The President of the United States takes pride in presenting the MEDAL OF HONOR posthumously to

PRIVATE FIRST CLASS BRUCE W. CARTER
UNITED STATES MARINE CORPS

for service as set forth in the following CITATION:

For conspicuous gallantry and intrepidity at the risk of his life above and beyond the call of duty while serving as Grenadier with Company H, Second Battalion, Third Marines, Third Marine Division in connection with combat operations against the enemy in the Republic of Vietnam. On 7 August 1969, Private First Class Carter's unit was maneuvering against the enemy during Operation Idaho Canyon and came under a heavy volume of fire from a numerically superior hostile force. The lead element soon became separated from the main body of the squad by a brush fire. Private First Class Carter and his fellow Marines were pinned down by vicious crossfire when, with complete disregard for his own safety, he stood in full view of the North Vietnamese Army soldiers to deliver a devastating volume of fire at their positions. The accuracy and aggressiveness of his attack caused several enemy casualties and forced the remainder of the soldiers to retreat from the immediate area. Shouting directions to the Marines around him, Private First Class Carter then commenced leading them from the path of the rapidly approaching brush fire when he observed a hostile grenade land between him and his companions. Fully aware of the probable consequences of his action, but determined to protect the men following him, he unhesitatingly threw himself over the grenade, absorbing the full effects of its detonation with his own body. Private First Class Carter's indomitable courage, inspiring initiative, and selfless devotion to duty upheld the highest traditions of the Marine Corps and the United States Naval Service. He gallantly gave his life in the service of his country.

/S/ RICHARD M. NIXON

== See also ==
- List of Medal of Honor recipients
- List of Medal of Honor recipients for the Vietnam War
