= Operation Idaho Canyon =

Part of the Vietnam War (1969)

- Part of Vietnam War
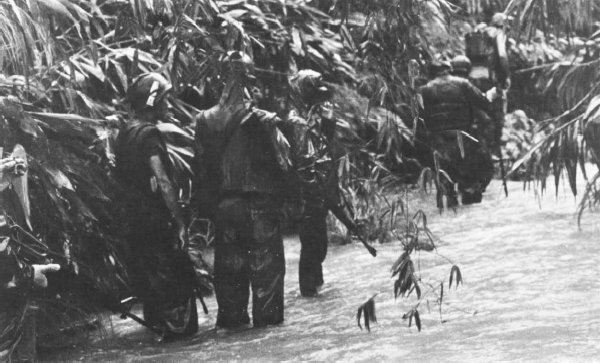
- 3/3 Marines cross a stream near Mutter's Ridge
Date	21 July – 25 September 1969
Location	north-central Quảng Trị Province, South Vietnam
Result	U.S. operational success

Belligerents
United States	North Vietnam

Commanders and leaders
MG William K. Jones; Col. Wilbur F. Simlik	

Units involved
1st Battalion, 3rd Marines; 2nd Battalion, 3rd Marines; 3rd Battalion, 3rd Marines; Company I, 3rd Battalion, 4th Marines; 1st Battalion, 11th Infantry Regiment; Company C, 1st Battalion, 77th Armored Regiment	9th Regiment, 304th Division

Casualties and losses
	US body count: 563 killed 201 weapons recovered

Operation Idaho Canyon was a United States Marine Corps operation in north-central Quảng Trị Province, South Vietnam from 21 July to 25 September 1969.

== Background ==
The operation was essentially a continuation of Operation Virginia Ridge - highly mobile company sized patrol and ambush operations across the operational area. 1st Battalion, 3rd Marines conducted "Denial Stingray" squad size multi-day patrols around Mutter's Ridge, 2nd Battalion, 3rd Marines conducted search and destroy operations north of The Rockpile, while 3rd Battalion, 3rd Marines conducted operated along Route 561 west of Charlie-2 (16.855°N 107.005°E).

== Operation ==
The early days of the operation saw only small skirmishes with People's Army of Vietnam (PAVN) forces. On 25 July as Company I, 3/3 Marines patrolled 4 km west of Charlie-2 they were hit by mortar, Rocket propelled grenade and small arms fire from a position to the north. The Marines called in artillery and air support and with Company C, 1/3 Marines forming a cordon to the west they moved through the area supported by tanks from Company A, 3rd Tank Battalion counting 20 PAVN dead and recovering two 60mm mortars.

After midnight on 28 July Company K, 3/3 Marines ambushed a PAVN unit killing six. At 02:00 35-40 PAVN attacked Company K's night defensive position killing three Marines before being forced to withdraw, a search of the perimeter at dawn found two PAVN dead and drag marks indicated that more dead and wounded had been removed.

On 28 July the 3rd Marine Regiment assumed operational control of the Army's 1st Battalion, 11th Infantry Regiment and Company C, 1st Battalion, 77th Armored Regiment. On 7 August as Company D, 1/11th Infantry searched a PAVN bunker complex in the Cam Hung Valley, 1 km south of the Vietnamese Demilitarized Zone (DMZ) they were attacked by two PAVN companies, in the daylong battle that followed three US and 56 PAVN soldiers were killed.

On 7 August Company F, 2/3 Marines patrolling Mutter's Ridge 2 km east of Landing Zone Mack found 2 entrenched PAVN companies. Despite air and artillery strikes the Marines were unable to take the PAVN positions and the PAVN launched a series of counterattacks. Napalm strikes started a bush fire which forced Company F to withdraw and evacuate their casualties while Company A, 1/3 Marines was landed to reinforce Company F. On the morning of 8 August Company F resumed their attack meeting light resistance and finding 46 PAVN dead. Documents found in the bunkers showed that the unit was from the 9th Regiment, 304th Division.

On 10 August a PAVN company attacked a two platoon Company E, 2/3 Marines night defensive position near Landing Zone Sierra, radio communication was lost forcing a halt to artillery support, leaving the Marines to defend the position with only small arms. The PAVN retreated at dawn leaving 17 dead, while the Marines had lost 13 killed. Meanwhile, 1 km southwest the PAVN attacked the 1st Platoon Company E 2/3 Marines position with mortar fire followed by a ground assault. The Marines fought back with air and artillery support killing 19 PAVN and losing six Marines. Company A was landed to support Company E and prepare an assault on suspected PAVN positions however they were instead ordered to withdraw.

After the attacks on Companies E and F, 3rd Marine Regiment commander Col. Wilbur F. Simlik ordered that units operating within 3 km of the DMZ had to be at least platoon-sized, night defensive positions within 5 km of the DMZ had to be company-sized and all companies had to move at least 1 km each day.

On 11 August Company K, 3/3 Marines patrolling west of Charlie-2 engaged a small group of PAVN, pursuing the retreating PAVN they came across two PAVN sapper platoons building bunkers. The Marines called in air and artillery strikes and engaged the PAVN. Company I, 3/3 Marines supported by tanks moved to join Company K, while Company M, 3/3 Marines established blocking positions. Company K overran the position finding 19 PAVN dead.

On 13 August the 1st Brigade, 5th Infantry Division (Mechanized) assumed responsibility for the Charlie-2 area and 3/3 Marines moved west to The Rockpile replacing 2/3 Marines which took responsibility for security around Cam Lộ Combat Base. 1/11th Infantry returned to the operational control of the 1st Brigade, 5th Infantry.

On 22 August Company L, 3/3 Marines patrolling near LZ Sierra and 1.2 km from the position where Company E had been attacked on 10 August, was ambushed by two entrenched PAVN platoons. Company L withdrew with air artillery support and the next day after preparatory strikes overran the position finding 10 PAVN dead.

On 28 August a PAVN sapper platoon attacked Company B, 1/3 Marines night defensive position 2 km north of Firebase Fuller, the attack was quickly repulsed. On 31 August another night attack was repulsed killing three PAVN. On 1 September Company B marksmen killed a further four PAVN.

On 5 September the PAVN attacked a Company I, 3/3 Marines night defensive position near LZ Mack, the attack was quickly repulsed with air and artillery support. Three wounded PAVN soldiers were captured, all were aged between 14 and 16 years old, suffering from low morale and had received only one month's training before being sent into combat.

On 10 September, despite a three-day ceasefire in observance of the death of Ho Chi Minh, 1st Platoon, Company I walked into a U-shaped ambush. Supporting fires were minimal due to the ceasefire, however Company I overran the PAVN position finding seven dead.

On 13 September, Company L, 3/3 Marines was moving onto Mutter's Ridge to replace Company I when a scout dog detected PAVN nearby. The PAVN then engaged the lead platoon and the Marines responded with small arms, mortar, artillery and AC-47 Spooky gunship fire, overrunning the PAVN position and finding eight PAVN dead.

On 15 September the PAVN ambushed Company K, 3/3 Marines as it moved from LZ Mack to LZ Sierra, killing two Marines in the initial assault. 45 minutes later PAVN mortar fire killed two more Marines and they withdrew to allow air and artillery strikes on the PAVN positions. A sweep of the area found eight PAVN dead.

After midnight on 17 September the PAVN attacked Company L, 3/3 Marines night defensive position on Hill 154 (16.855°N 107.005°E), briefly penetrating their perimeter. The fighting continued until dawn when the PAVN withdrew leaving 41 dead while Marines losses were 13 dead. At 08:00 Company I, 3rd Battalion, 4th Marines was landed southwest of LZ Sierra and moved to support Company L. As it moved along a ridgeline the lead platoon fired on two PAVN triggering an ambush, the platoon withdrew to the company's defensive perimeter while air and artillery strikes hit the PAVN position. The PAVN continued to attack Company I with sniper, machine gun and mortar fire killing four Marines. On the morning of 18 September Company I swept through the abandoned PAVN ambush position finding nine dead, Marine losses were nine dead. Company I arrived at Hill 154 and was then withdrawn to Vandegrift Combat Base. Meanwhile, Company L reinforced by a platoon from Company H, 2/3 Marines had moved off Hill 154 to a position overlooking the Cam Lộ River. At 04:00 on 19 September Company L's position was hit by grenades and Rocket propelled grenade (RPG) fire and they responded with artillery fire. Later that day Company I killed three PAVN as they attempted to cross the river and an RPG ignited a mortar round killing one Marine. Company L joined up with Company M that night and on 20 September they were withdrawn from the operation having suffered 64 casualties out of a strength of 156 Marines since 13 August.

== Aftermath ==
On 25 September the 3rd Marine Division ordered the 3rd Marine Regiment to cease all offensive operations in preparation for their redeployment from South Vietnam, ending Operation Idaho Canyon. The operation resulted in the US claiming 563 PAVN killed and 201 weapons captured.
