= 3rd Landing Support Battalion =

3d Landing Support Battalion
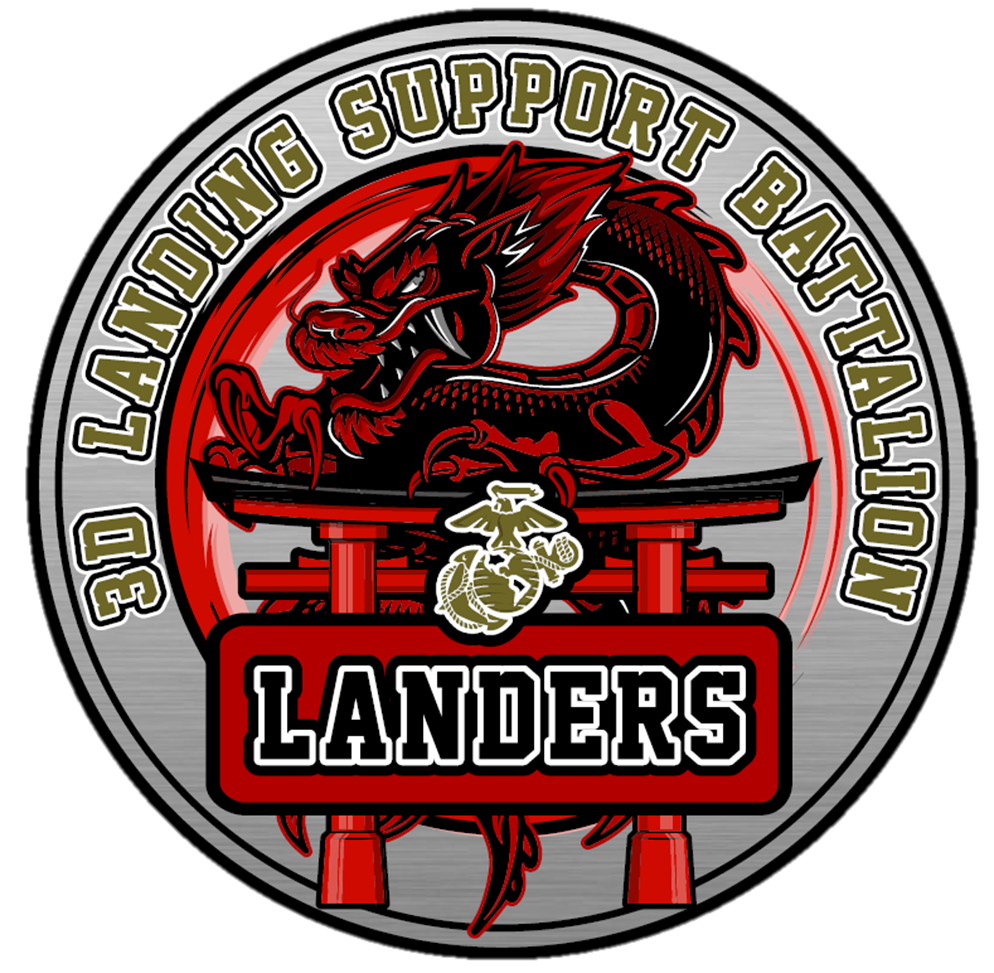
- 3d LSB insignia
- Active: 1942 - 1976; November 2, 2020 - present
- Country: United States of America
- Branch: United States Marine Corps
- Size: 600
- Part of: Combat Logistics Regiment 3; 3rd Marine Logistics Group
- Garrison/HQ: Camp Foster
- Nickname: Landers
- Engagements: World War II: Battle of Bougainville; Battle of Guam; Battle of Iwo Jima; Vietnam War

Commanders
- Current commander: LtCol Tabatha R. Spriggs

3d Landing Support Battalion (3d LSB) is a logistics battalion in the United States Marine Corps that supports distributed maritime operations and expeditionary advanced base operations. The unit is based out of Camp Foster, Okinawa, Japan and falls under the command of the 3rd Marine Logistics Group (3d MLG) and the III Marine Expeditionary Force (III MEF).

== Mission ==
Supports III MEF for ship-to-shore movement during amphibious operations and terminal operations and during subsequent operations ashore in order to facilitate throughput of supplies, equipment, and personnel for sustainment via air, ground, and sea.

== Table of organization ==
- Headquarters and Service Company.
- Landing Support Company
- Motor Transport Company

== History ==
The 3d Service Battalion was commissioned on September 16, 1942, at Camp Elliott, San Diego, California. During World War II the battalion took part in combat operations at Bougainville, Guam, and Iwo Jima. Following the war the battalion was decommissioned on December 28, 1945, at Marine Corps Base Camp Pendleton, California.

== Unit awards ==
A unit citation or commendation is an award bestowed upon an organization for the action cited. Members of the unit who participated in said actions are allowed to wear on their uniforms the awarded unit citation. Awards and decorations of the United States Armed Forces have different categories: i.e. Service, Campaign, Unit, and Valor. 3d LSB has been presented with the following awards:

Streamer	Award	Year(s)	Additional Info
A green streamer with red, gold, and blue horizontal stripes along the top and bottom with one silver star in the center	Navy Unit Commendation Streamer with two Bronze Star		
	Asiatic-Pacific Campaign Streamer with four Bronze Stars		Bougainville, Guam, Iwo Jima
	World War II Victory Streamer	1941–1945	Pacific War
A red streamer with a horizontal gold stripe and three bronze stars in the center	National Defense Service Streamer with three Bronze Stars	1951–1954, 1961–1974, 2001–present	Korean War, Vietnam War, war on terrorism
	Korean Service Streamer	1950-1953	
A yellow streamer with two green horizontal stripes on the outside and three horizontal red stripes and two silver stars and one bronze star in the center	Vietnam Service Streamer with two Silver Stars and one Bronze Star		
A blue streamer with yellow, red, and white horizontal stripes	Global War on Terrorism Service Streamer	2001–present	
A gold streamer with red horizontal stripes on the outer portions and a green palm in the center	Vietnam Gallantry Cross with Palm Streamer	1965–1971	

== See also ==
- Logistics Combat Element
- List of United States Marine Corps battalions
- Organization of the United States Marine Corps
