= Combat Logistics Regiment 3 =

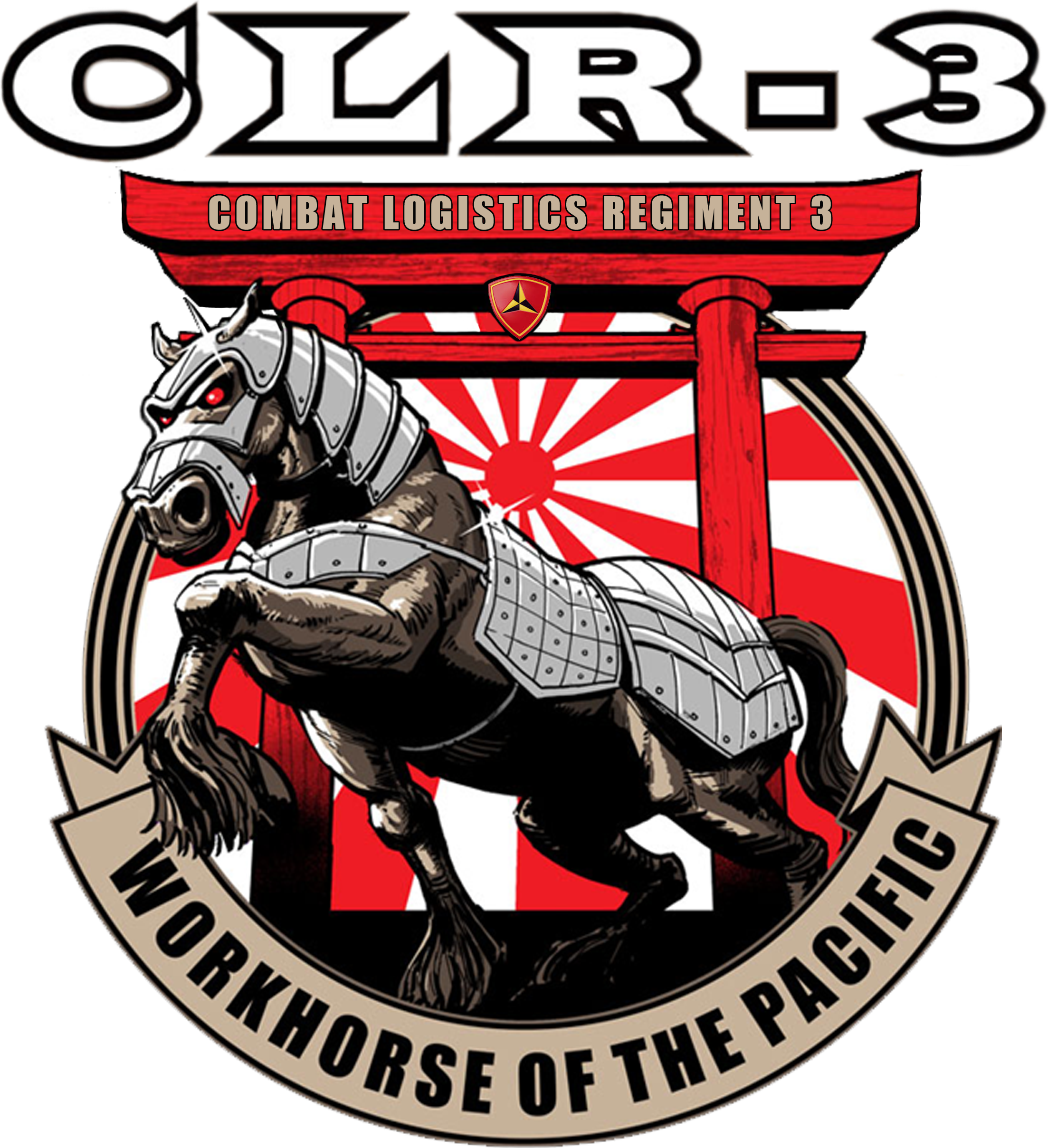
- Combat Logistics Regiment 3 logo
- Active: September 16, 1942 – December 24, 1945; March 5, 1952 – May 1, 1958; July 1, 1964 – present
- Country: United States
- Allegiance: United States of America
- Branch: United States Marine Corps
- Type: Combat Logistics
- Role: Provide Direct Support Combat Logistics Support to III MEF MAGTF
- Part of: 3rd Marine Logistics Group; III Marine Expeditionary Force
- Garrison/HQ: Camp Foster, Okinawa, Japan
- Nickname: Workhorse of the Pacific
- Motto: N/A
- Engagements: World War II; Vietnam War; Operation Desert Storm; Operation Enduring Freedom; Operation Iraqi Freedom

Commanders
- Current commander: Colonel Jarrad Caola
- Notable commanders: LtGen Charles G. Chiarotti

Combat Logistics Regiment 3 (CLR-3) is a direct support (DS) logistics unit of the United States Marine Corps and is headquartered at Camp Foster, Okinawa, Japan. The unit falls under the 3rd Marine Logistics Group and the III Marine Expeditionary Force.

== Mission ==
CLR-3, as the direct support logistics provider for the 3rd Marine Division, provides direct support combat logistics support to elements of III MEF and conducts simultaneous, tactical security operations in order to ensure mission accomplishment across the spectrum of conflict. Be prepared to provide scalable, task-organized elements to conduct humanitarian assistance and non-combatant evacuation operations (HAO/NEO) within the area of operations.

== Organization 2024 ==
As of January 2025 the Combat Logistics Regiment 3 consists of:

- Combat Logistics Regiment 3
  - Headquarters Company
  - Combat Logistics Battalion 4
  - 3rd Landing Support Battalion

== History ==
=== World War II ===
Activated 16 September 1942 at Camp Elliot, San Diego, California as the 2nd Battalion (Pioneers), 19th Marines, 3rd Marine Division, Fleet Marine Force.

Deployed during February 1943 to Auckland, New Zealand

Redeployed during August 1943 to Guadalcanal

Participated in the following World War II Campaigns: Northern Solomon’s, Cape Toro kina (Bougainville), Guam, and Iwo Jima

Redesignated 7 September 1944 as the 3rd Pioneer Battalion, 3rd Marine Division

Relocated during December 1945 to Camp Pendleton, California

Deactivated 24 December 1945

=== 1952–1969 ===
Reactivated 5 March 1952 at Camp Pendleton, California, as 3rd Shore Party Battalion, 3rd Marine Division

Relocated during August 1953 to Camp McGill, Japan

Relocated during March 1956 to Camp Hauge, Okinawa

Relocated during June 1957 to Camp McGill, Japan

Relocated during August 1957 to Camp Kubasaki, Japan

Relocated during October 1957 to Koza, Okinawa

Deactivated 1 May 1958

Reactivated 1 July 1964 at Camp McTureous, Okinawa as 3rd Shore Party Battalion, 3rd Marine Division

Relocated during February 1965 to Camp Hauge, Okinawa

=== Vietnam War ===
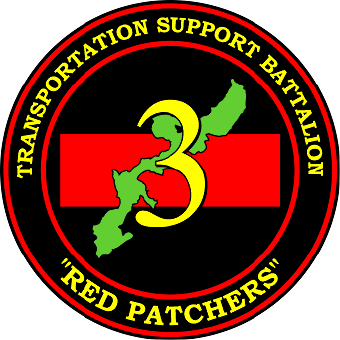
3rd TSB unit logo

Redeployed during April–July 1965 to the Republic of Vietnam

1969–present

Participated in the Vietnam War, April 1965 – November 1969, operating from Da Nang, Chu Lai, Phu Bai, Dong Ha, and Quang Tri .

Relocated during November 1969 to Camp Hansen, Okinawa

Relocated during November 1970 to Camp Huage, Okinawa

Relocated during August 1971 to Camp Hansen, Okinawa

Redesignated 15 April 1976 as 3rd Headquarters and Service Battalion, 3rd Division Support Group, 3rd Marine Division

Redesignated 15 October 1978 as 3rd Provisional Landing Support Battalion, 3rd Division Support Group, 3rd Marine Division and relocated to Camp Foster, Okinawa .

Redesignated 15 April 1979 as 3rd Landing Support Battalion, 3rd Force Service Support Group, Fleet Marine Forces Pacific.

=== The Gulf War and the 1990s ===
Provided support for Operation Desert Shield and Desert Storm, South West Asia; Operation Provide Comfort; Iraq; Operation Sea Angel, Bangladesh; and Operation Fiery Vigil, Republic of the Philippines, July 1989 – June 1991

Redesignated 1 July 1993 as 3rd Support Battalion

Redesignated 1 July 1999 as 3rd Transportation Support Battalion

=== Global War on Terror ===
Redesignated Combat Logistics Regiment 3 on 11 August 2006

== See also ==
- List of United States Marine Corps regiments
- Organization of the United States Marine Corps
