= Combat Logistics Battalion 4 =

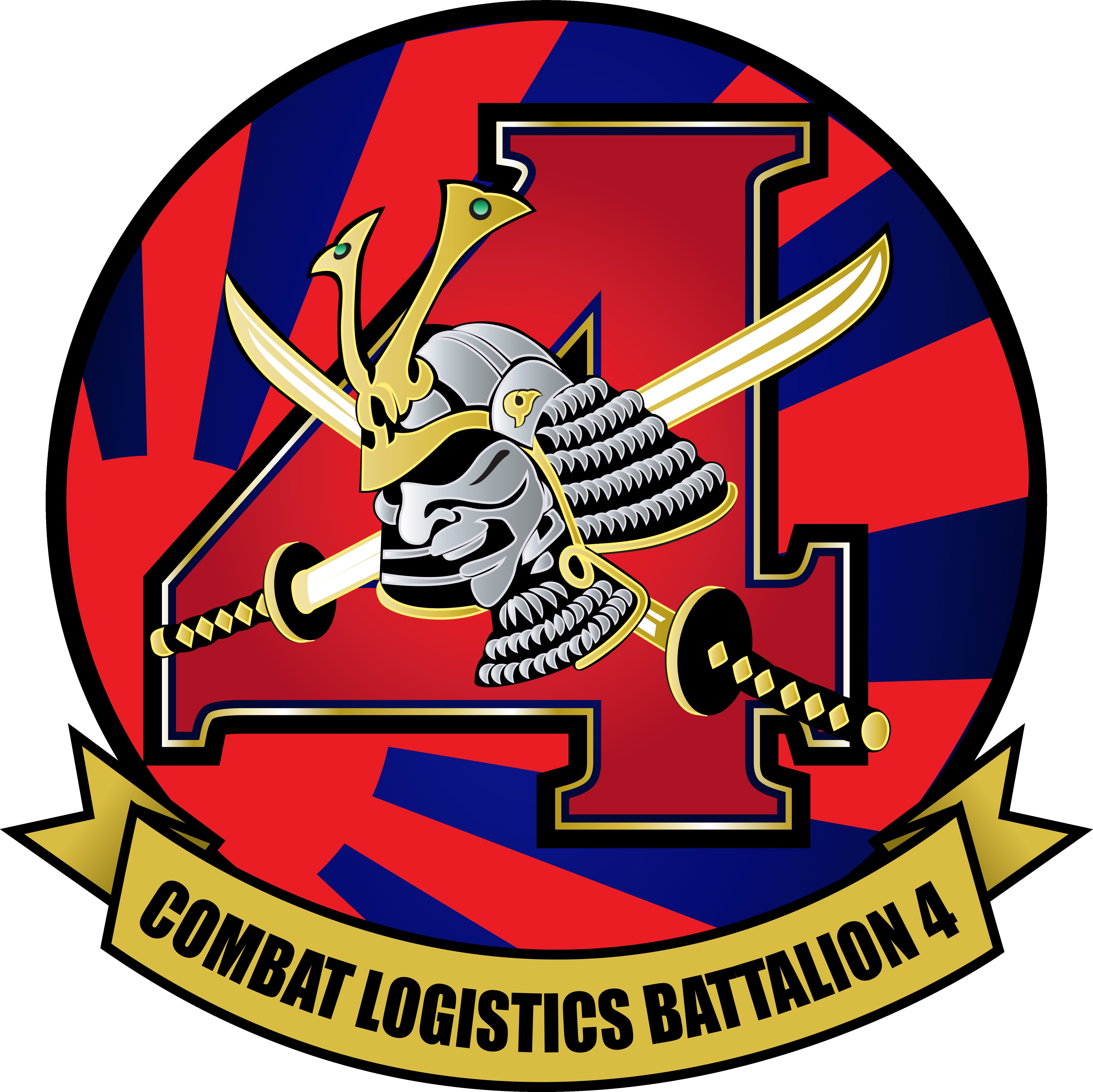
- Active: 4 October 2006 – present
- Country: United States
- Branch: USMC
- Type: Logistics
- Size: Battalion
- Part of: 3rd Marine Logistics Group
- Garrison/HQ: Camp Schwab
- Nickname: Ronin
- Motto: The Supporting Edge
- Anniversaries: 4 October 2007
- Engagements: Operation Iraqi Freedom

Commanders
- Current commander: LtCol Nathan J. Green

Combat Logistics Battalion 4 (CLB-4) is a logistics unit of the United States Marine Corps (USMC). The battalion falls under the command of Combat Logistics Regiment 3, which is a part of the 3rd Marine Logistics Group. They are based at Camp Schwab, Okinawa, Japan and their mission includes construction, demolition, supply, transportation, maintenance and fabrication.

== Subordinate units ==
- Headquarters Company
- Combat Logistics Company A
- General Services Company

== Mission ==
Provide direct support (DS) tactical logistics to a 4th Marine Regiment beyond its organic capabilities in the areas of transportation, intermediate level supply, field level maintenance, and general engineering.

== History ==
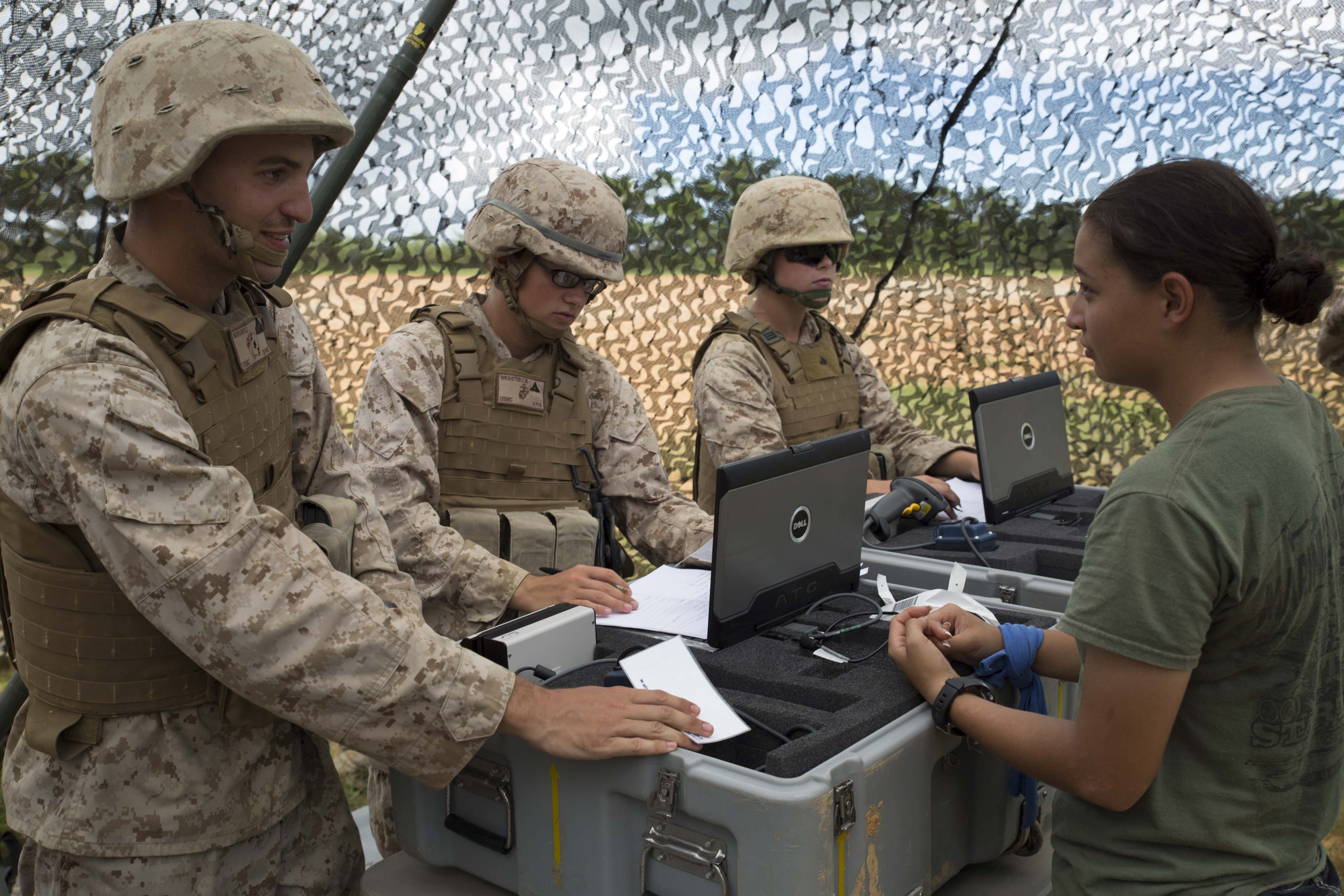
Personnel in a training exercise

CLB-4 / CLR-3 was originally 3rd Transportation Support Battalion until changing in 2007. CLB-4 was the first full battalion to deploy from Okinawa, Japan since the Vietnam War. The battalion deployed to Al Anbar Province, Iraq in support of Regimental Combat 6 during Operation Iraqi Freedom in 2007 and 2009. The battalion had one Marine injured and no fatalities during these deployments. CLB-4 has also deployed in support of OEF in 2012.

== See also ==
- List of United States Marine Corps battalions
- Organization of the United States Marine Corps
