= George O. Van Orden =

United States Marine Corps general

George Owen Van Orden
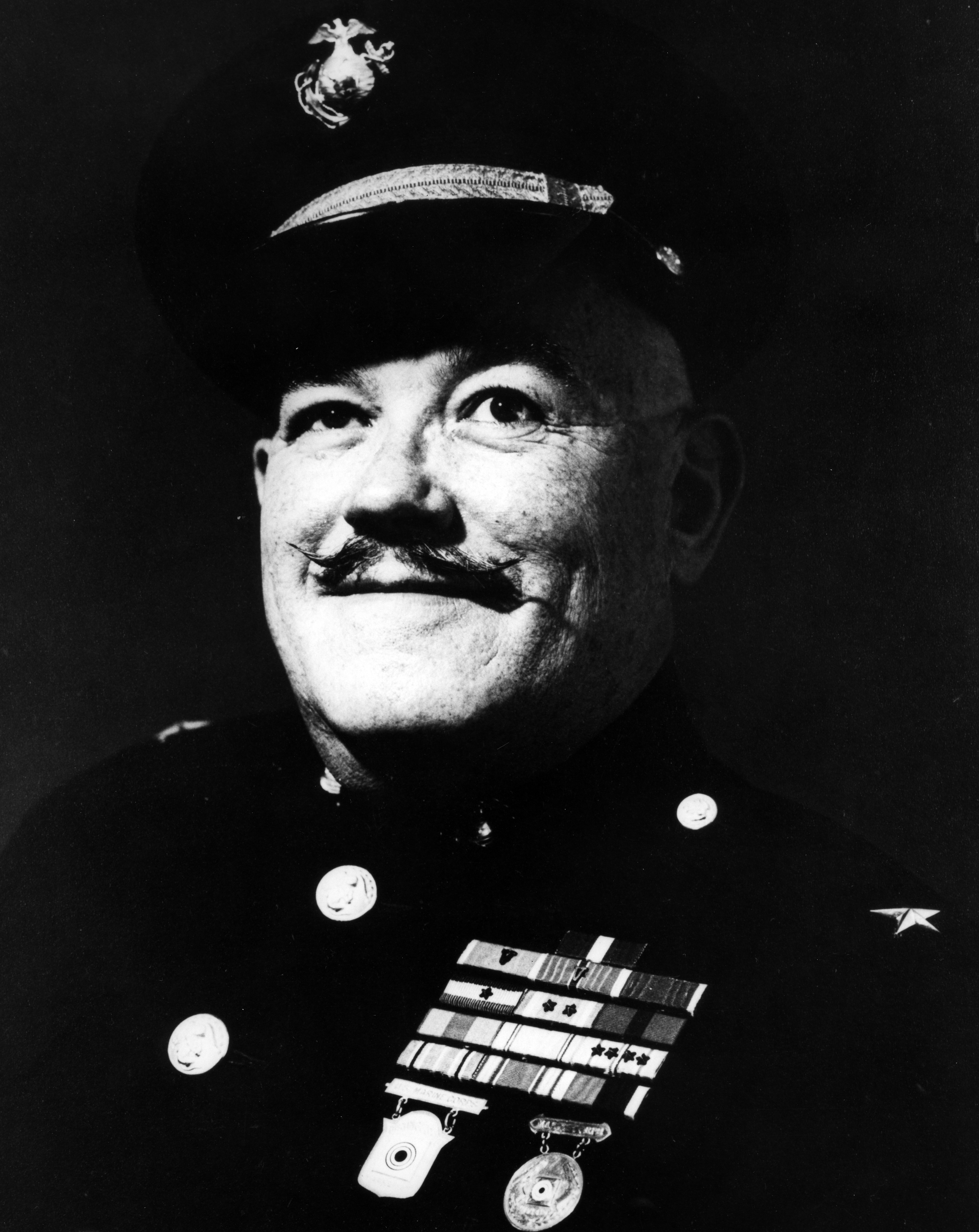
- BG George O. Van Orden, USMC
- Born: September 9, 1906; Pensacola, Florida, US
- Died: May 13, 1967 (aged 60); New Hope, Pennsylvania, US
- Burial place: Arlington National Cemetery
- Military career
- Allegiance: United States of America
- Branch: United States Marine Corps
- Service years: 1925–1949
- Rank: Brigadier general
- Nickname: "The Beast"
- Service number: 0-4335
- Commands: 3rd Marine Regiment; 1st Battalion, 3rd Marines
- Conflicts: Haitian Campaign; World War II: New Georgia Campaign; Bougainville Campaign; Landings at Cape Torokina; Battle of Koromokina Lagoon; Battle of Piva Forks; Landing on Emirau; Recapture of Guam
- Awards: Navy Cross; Legion of Merit; Bronze Star Medal; Purple Heart
- Other work: Gun Store Owner

George Owen Van Orden (September 9, 1906 – May 13, 1967) was a decorated U.S. Marine brigadier general. He is most noted for his service as executive officer of the 3rd Marine Regiment during the Bougainville Campaign, where he received the Navy Cross, the United States military's second-highest decoration awarded for valor in combat. Van Orden completed his career as director of First Marine Corps Reserve District in Boston, Massachusetts.

He is considered to be the "Father of Marine Snipers" due to co-authoring in 1942 a Marine Corps report recommending adoption of the M70 rifle with Unertl 8X scope for military use (ultimately unsuccessful) and his subsequent role establishing the training program for USMC snipers.

== Early career ==
George Owen Van Orden was born on September 9, 1906, at the Marine Barracks, Pensacola, Florida, as the son of late marine colonel George Van Orden and his wife Stella Leone Owen. His father served as commanding officer of the Marine barracks at that time, and young George spent his childhood between marines. He later attended Manlius School in DeWitt, New York and subsequently received appointment to the United States Naval Academy at Annapolis, Maryland. However, Van Orden left the academy in May 1925 after two years of study and enlisted as private in the Marine Corps on May 25, 1925, at Baltimore, Maryland. He served for two years as enlisted man, reached the rank of sergeant and later qualified as Expert rifleman for rifle competitions at Quantico. Van Orden received the Marine Corps Good Conduct Medal for his exemplary behavior and was selected to attend Officer Candidates School at Quantico, Virginia, in July 1927 and completed the Meritorious Commissioning Program in March 1928.

He was commissioned second lieutenant during that time and ordered to the Basic School at Philadelphia Navy Yard for additional officer training. Van Orden completed the school one year later and sailed for Haiti as a member of 1st Marine Brigade. He remained in the Caribbean until summer 1931 and subsequently served with the Marine detachment aboard the battleship USS Oklahoma in the Pacific Ocean.

Following his return to the United States, Van Orden served consecutively as commanding officer of Marine Rifle Ranges at Cape May, New Jersey, Wakefield, Massachusetts, and Quantico, Virginia. He graduated from the Artillery Course, Marine Corps Schools, Quantico and had extensive experience in naval antiaircraft and seacoast gunnery. Improving small arms marksmanship and techniques of weapons of all types were all consuming interest with him. A Distinguished Marksman, he has been active in competitive marksmanship, ordnance design, and weapons training, since early in his career.

Van Orden was stationed as captain and Marine detachment commander at the Naval Air Engineering Station Lakehurst, when airship LZ 129 Hindenburg crashed on May 6, 1937. He commanded his Marines during the salvage operation and received a letter of commendation by the commandant, Thomas Holcomb, "for exercising "good judgment and initiative in immediately leading his Marine Detachment to the scene of the disastrous destruction by fire of the "Hindenburg" as it nosed to its mooring mast."

He was transferred to the Division of Plans and Policies at Headquarters Marine Corps in Washington, D.C., in 1939 and served as an Umpire during the Fleet Landing Exercise in Culebra, Puerto Rico. Late in that year, Van Orden was ordered for instruction to Ordnance Field Service School at Raritan Arsenal in Metuchen, New Jersey.

== World War II ==
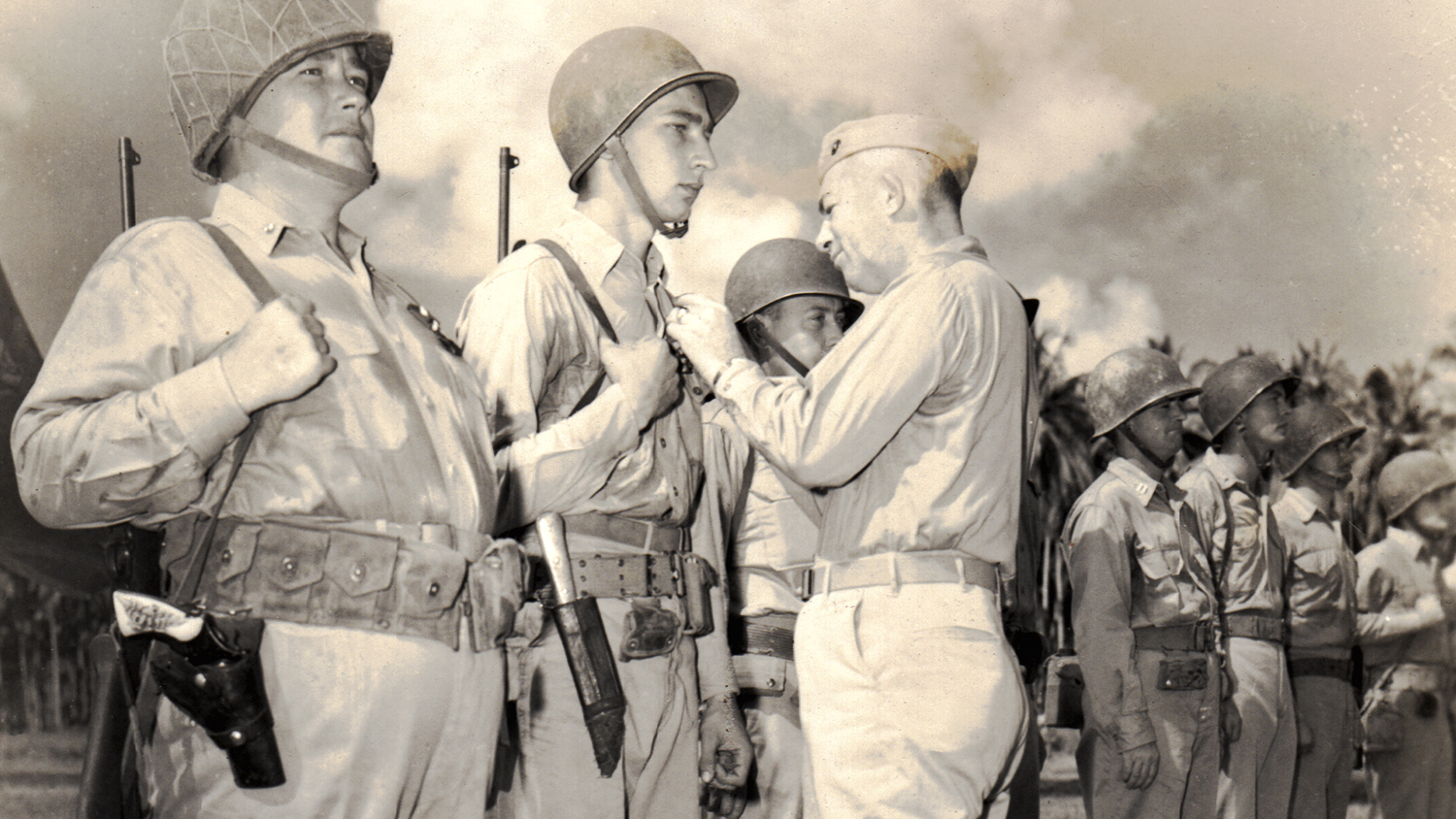
George O. Van Orden (on the left) during his Navy Cross Ceremony with Major General Allen H. Turnage, commanding general, 3rd Marine Division.

Upon the completion of the course at Ordnance School, Van Orden was promoted to the rank of Major and ordered to the Marine Corps Base Quantico. While there, he was appointed Commanding officer of Rifle Range Detachment, Post Service, Battalion in December 1939 and took part in the evaluation of the M1941 Johnson rifle, which was later used during the Pacific campaign.

Within this capacity, Van Orden was also responsible for the Scout-Sniper School and together with Marine Gunner Calvin Lloyd, he worked out the manual "Equipping the American Sniper". This expert treatise defined sniper usage and made specific recommendations for their armament. Small schools opened in different locations, teaching the skills their treatise outlined and graduates were promptly dispatched to the Pacific.

Van Orden was promoted to the rank of major and tasked with the organization of the Marine Corps Ordnance School of which he was the founding director in April 1942. This unique school had the job of training Marines to keep artillery weapons, fire control instruments, and ammunition functioning properly no matter how tough the going. Artillery weapons, anti-aircraft guns, fire control directors, range finders, gasoline-electric power plants, gyro-stabilized guns in light tanks – all came under the maintenance responsibilities of Ordnance School graduates.

He was ordered to Camp Lejeune, North Carolina in July 1942 and appointed commanding officer, 1st Battalion of the reactivated 3rd Marine Regiment under Colonel Oscar R. Cauldwell. After the two months of training, Van Orden sailed with his battalion to Tutuila, American Samoa in September 1942 and participated in the garrison duty until May 1943. While in American Samoa, Van Orden was promoted to the rank of lieutenant colonel and appointed executive officer of 3rd Marine Regiment.

The 3rd Marines were subsequently attached to the 3rd Marine Division in Auckland, New Zealand and undergone more intensive combined training. Van Orden was attached to the staff of XIV Army Corps under Major General Oscar Griswold and served as an observer during Battle of Vella Lavella within New Georgia Campaign in August 1943.

He rejoined his regiment on Guadalcanal in October 1943 and subsequently sailed for Bougainville at Papua New Guinea in order to capture the island from Japanese troops. The Bougainville was held by almost 70,000 Japanese troops.

Van Orden and 3rd Marine regiment took part in the landing at Cape Torokina under heavy enemy fire on November 1, 1943, and Van Orden participated in the main landing. He distinguished himself and received the Navy Cross, the United States military's second-highest decoration awarded for valor in combat.

His official Navy Cross citation reads:

The President of the United States of America takes pleasure in presenting the Navy Cross to Lieutenant Colonel George Owen Van Orden (MCSN: 0-4335), United States Marine Corps, for extraordinary heroism and distinguished service while serving as Executive Officer of the Third Marines, THIRD Marine Division (Reinforced), during action against enemy Japanese forces in the Cape Torokina Area, Bougainville, Solomon Islands, on 1 November 1943. Landing in a free boat which was repeatedly struck by enemy fire during its approach to the beach, Lieutenant Colonel Van Orden discovered our fighting units in disorder and, fearlessly exposing himself to hostile gun emplacements, promptly reorganized the forces, appointed new leaders and reestablished control, enabling our troops to continue the attack. Later, when severe enemy machine-gun fire drove the shore party from the beach and interrupted ship unloading activities essential to the success of our landing operations, he unhesitatingly proceeded to the area and, with utter disregard for his own safety, inspired and encouraged the men to complete their vital task. Lieutenant Colonel Van Orden's intrepid leadership and resolute devotion to duty in the face of grave peril were in keeping with the highest traditions of the United States Naval Service.

One Marine witnessed him,

blazing away in the direction of the enemy with his pistol ... After emptying a magazine at the invisible (at least to me) target, Van Orden stepped back from the rear wall of the bunker, cleared, reloaded, and holstered his pistol ... with a self-satisfied grin on his face as if he had just completed a successful string of rapid fire.

For his heroics, he earned the nickname "The Beast".

Van Orden remained with the regiment during the Battle of Koromokina Lagoon on November 7–8 and later during the Battle of Piva Forks at the end of month. For his service during the latter part of Bougainville Campaign, Van Orden was decorated with the Legion of Merit with Combat "V". He also held temporary command of the 3rd Marine Regiment at the end of December 1943.

He was then attached to the I Marine Amphibious Corps Task Group (composed of I Marine Amphibious Corps staff) and participated in the Landing on Emirau in March–April 1944. The landing was unopposed and Van Orden joined the staff of 3rd Marine Division under Major General Allen H. Turnage. He was appointed Division Infantry Training Officer and participated in the Recapture of Guam in July–August 1944.

Despite the initial success of the landing, Japanese launched a counterattack during the night of July 25–26, and some enemy troops slipped through the front lines. General Turnage ordered Van Orden to assume command of two companies from 3rd Pioneer Battalion to eliminate this threat. In three hours the pioneers killed 33 of the assailants and lost three of their own men. Van Orden was slightly wounded and received the Bronze Star Medal with Combat "V" for his merits during Guam operation. Guam was declared secure on August 10, 1944.

Van Orden was ordered back to the United States in November 1944 and assumed command of Marine Barracks at Klamath Falls, Oregon, which served as the rehabilitation center for tropical diseases. He served in this capacity until July 1945, when he was ordered back to the Pacific area as commanding officer of 5th Field Service Depot at Guam. Within this capacity, he was responsible for the clothing, ordnance, equipment and supplies for the V Amphibious Corps units. He was also promoted to the rank of colonel for his new assignment.

== Postwar service ==
Following the surrender of Japan in August 1945, Van Orden and his depot moved to Sasebo, Japan, and participated in the occupation duties until February 1946, when he was attached to the staff of Fleet Marine Force, West Pacific under Brigadier General Gerald C. Thomas as logistics officer. During this assignment, Van Orden came into conflict with the regulations, when he was accused of improper handling of military rations. He received instruction about handling of rations in peculiarly worded order and did what the letter of the order said. However his superiors insisted, that what he did wasn't what the order meant.

Although Inspector general of the Marine Corps, Robert Blake, didn't find the accusation legitimate, because Van Orden did what the letter of the order said, both quartermaster general William P. T. Hill and director of personnel Pedro del Valle, overruled him and Van Orden received a Letter of reprimand. Van Orden was subsequently transferred back to the United States and attached to the Marine Corps Base Quantico.

He served with the Marine Corps Equipment Board under Brigadier General Louis R. Jones as its executive officer and remained in that capacity until mid June 1948. He then assumed his last duty as director of First Marine Corps Reserve District in Boston, Massachusetts and held this assignment until his retirement on September 1, 1949, after 25 years of Marine service. He was advanced to the rank of brigadier general on the retired list for having been specially commended in combat.

== Retirement ==
Upon his retirement from the Marine Corps, Van Orden settled in Quantico, Virginia, and opened a gun store, "Evaluators Limited" in Triangle, Virginia. The gun store specialized in selling firearms and equipment to military and law enforcement personnel including United States Coast Guard. He later served as a director of the National Rifle Association in New Hope, Pennsylvania, where he died on May 13, 1967.

He is buried at Arlington National Cemetery, Virginia, together with his wife Flora Mason Van Orden (1907–1990). They had a daughter, Flora, and a son, George Mason Van Orden (1939–2013), who also served in the Marines and retired as lieutenant colonel in 1983. George O. Van Orden's grandson, George Kelley Van Orden, served in the Marines and retired in 2003 as chief warrant officer W-3.

== Decorations ==
Here is the ribbon bar of Brigadier General George O. Van Orden:

1st Row	Navy Cross		
2nd Row	Legion of Merit with Combat "V"	Bronze Star Medal with Combat "V"	Purple Heart
3rd Row	Navy Presidential Unit Citation with one star	Navy Unit Commendation with two stars	Marine Corps Good Conduct Medal
4th Row	Marine Corps Expeditionary Medal	American Defense Service Medal	Asiatic-Pacific Campaign Medal with four 3/16 inch service stars
5th Row	American Campaign Medal	World War II Victory Medal	Navy Occupation Service Medal

Military offices
Preceded by Walter A. Wachtler	Commanding Officer of the 3rd Marine Regiment; December 28, 1943 - January 21, 1944	Succeeded by William C. Hall
