= 3rd Marine Littoral Regiment =

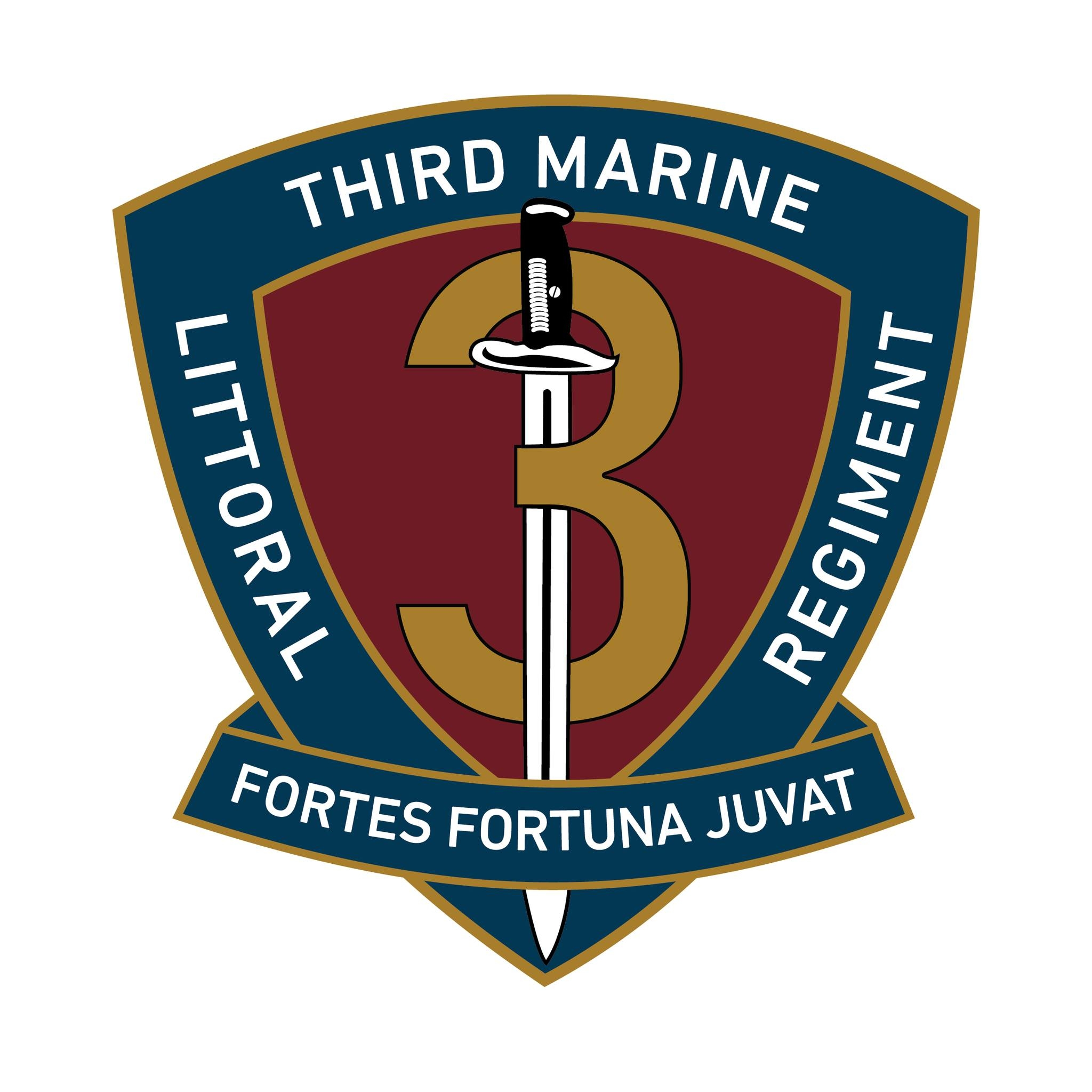
- 3rd Marine Littoral Regiment insignia
- Active: 1914; 1916 - 1922; 1942 - present
- Country: United States of America
- Branch: United States Marine Corps
- Type: Littoral
- Size: Regiment
- Part of: 3rd Marine Division
- Garrison/HQ: Marine Corps Base Hawaii
- Motto: Fortes Fortuna Juvat
- Engagements: World War II; Battle of Bougainville; Battle of Guam; Agana race riot; Vietnam War; Operation Starlite; Battle of Hill 881; Operation Virginia Ridge; Operation Idaho Canyon; Tet Offensive; Operation Desert Storm; Battle of Khafji; War on terror; Operation Enduring Freedom; Iraq War; Operation Iraqi Freedom; Second Battle of Fallujah

Commanders
- Current commander: Colonel John G. Lehane
- Notable commanders: Oscar R. Cauldwell; George O. Van Orden; Edward H. Hurst; Edwin B. Wheeler; Wilbur F. Simlik; Sid McMath

The 3d Marine Littoral Regiment (3d MLR) is a regiment of the United States Marine Corps that is optimized for littoral maneuver in the Indo-Pacific Theater. Based at Marine Corps Base Hawaii, the regiment falls under the command of the 3rd Marine Division and the III Marine Expeditionary Force. It was known as the 3rd Marine Regiment from 1914 to 2022, when it was renamed as part of the Commandant of the Marine Corps' Force Design 2030 initiative. The 3d MLR has participated in the 2022 and 2023 Balikatan exercises in Northern Luzon, Philippines.

== Organization ==
The Regiment is composed of one Littoral Combat Team, one Littoral Anti-Air Battalion, one Littoral Logistics Battalion, one Communications Company, and one Headquarters and Service Company.

- Headquarters and Service Company, 3d MLR
- Communications Company, 3d MLR
- 3d Littoral Combat Team (formerly 1st Battalion, 3d Marines)
- 3d Littoral Anti-Air Battalion
- 3rd Littoral Logistics Battalion (formerly Combat Logistics Battalion 3)

== History ==
=== Early years ===
The 3rd Marine Regiment was originally formed as part of the 1st Provisional Brigade, created in March 1911. A 3rd Regiment was formed on 14 March 1911 by consolidating Marine detachments from the various ships of the U.S. Atlantic Fleet then at anchor within Guantanamo Bay, Cuba. The regimental commander was Lieutenant Colonel Ben H. Fuller, who later became the 15th Commandant of the Marine Corps (1930-1934).

Until 17 June 1911, the 3rd Regiment was stationed at Camp Meyer, Deer Point, Guantanamo Bay. Companies E, F, and H reverted to their original assignments as ships' detachments on 10–11 June, while the rest of the regiment's letter companies did so on 17 June, at which time the 3rd Regiment was disbanded.

Another provisional regiment, tentatively designated as the 3rd, was formed on 21 April 1914 from Marine detachments of the ships that had converged on Vera Cruz. It was commanded by Major Albertus W. Catlin, who would receive the Medal of Honor for his actions on 22 April. Assigned to support the activities of the 2nd Marine Regiment already ashore, the 3rd landed the same day it was formed. During the same period, another 3rd Regiment was assembled at the Philadelphia Navy Yard on 22 April 1914, under the command of Colonel Franklin J. Moses III (the son of Franklin J. Moses Jr.). It departed for Vera Cruz on board SS Morro Castle the next day.

With the arrival of Colonel Moses' 3rd Regiment at Vera Cruz on 30 April, all Marine units, except Major Catlin's command, were placed under the operational control of United States Expeditionary Forces, United States Army. Major Catlin's 3rd Regiment was disbanded the same date, with its personnel returning to their respective ships. During its stay in Mexico, Colonel Moses' command performed outpost and patrol duty and, at the same time, improved sanitary and living conditions within its sector.

Colonel Moses died of pneumonia on 26 September, six days after being evacuated to the hospital ship, USS Solace. He was succeeded by Major John H. Russell, Jr., who later became the 16th Commandant of the Marine Corps (1934-1936). The 3rd Regiment left Vera Cruz on 23 November, arrived at the Philadelphia Navy Yard on 4 December, and was disbanded the following day.

The regiment was reactivated on 20 December 1916, from assets of the 1st Marine Regiment in the Dominican Republic. They were attached to the 2nd Brigade and deactivated on 1 August 1922.

=== World War II ===
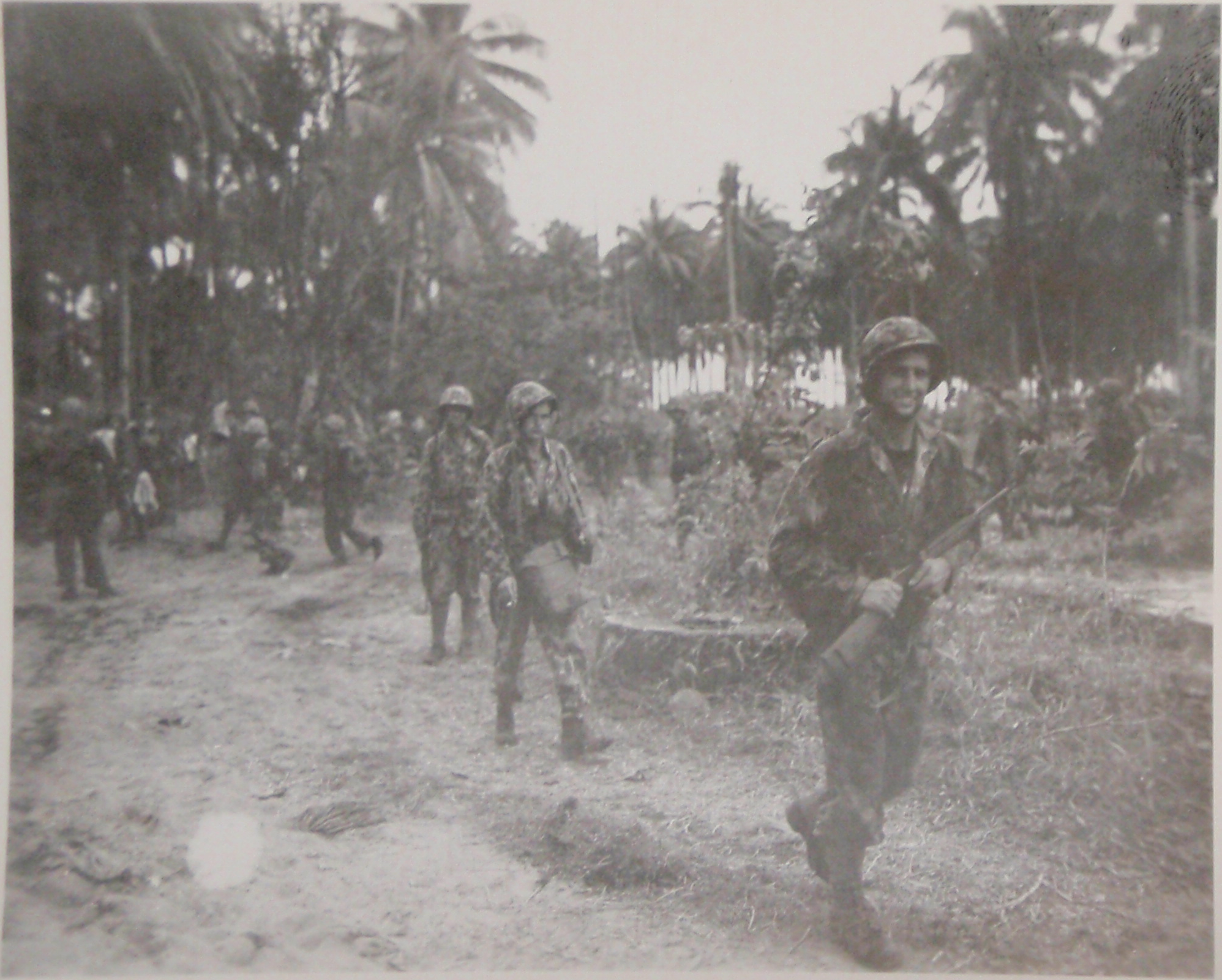
Men of 1st Battalion emerge from the jungle during the Bougainville campaign, New Guinea

The 3rd Marine Regiment was reactivated on 16 June 1942, at New River, North Carolina, as part of the World War II military expansion. They deployed to American Samoa on 14 September 1942, and were attached to the 2nd Marine Brigade. The regiment redeployed to New Zealand on 23 May 1943, and were reassigned to the 3rd Marine Division at that time.

The regiment fought at Bougainville and Guam. Four Medals of Honor were awarded to members of 3rd Marines for actions during this period. Members of the unit were involved in the Agana race riot while stationed on Guam. During the Battle of Iwo Jima the 3rd Marines were kept in Reserve and were not sent ashore.

Following World War II, the regiment was ordered to China to aid in the disarming of Japanese units and to assist the Nationalist government in the occupation of Northern China in an effort to deny land to the communists.

=== Korean War ===
During the Korean War, the 3d Marines, under the command of Lieutenant Colonel John J. Gormley, was reactivated at Marine Corps Base Camp Pendleton on 20 June 1951 as part of the 3d Marine Brigade. In January 1952, the regiment was reassigned to the 3d Marine Division. The Division went to Japan in August 1953 and 3d Marines set up its headquarters at Camp Fuji-McNair. Durings its stay in Japan, the Regiment conducted many field and landing exercises. 3d Marines was relocated to Camp Sukiran, Okinawa in March 1957. Elements of the Regiment were deployed to various areas in the Far East when political upheaval or crises occurred between 1957 and 1964.

=== Vietnam War ===
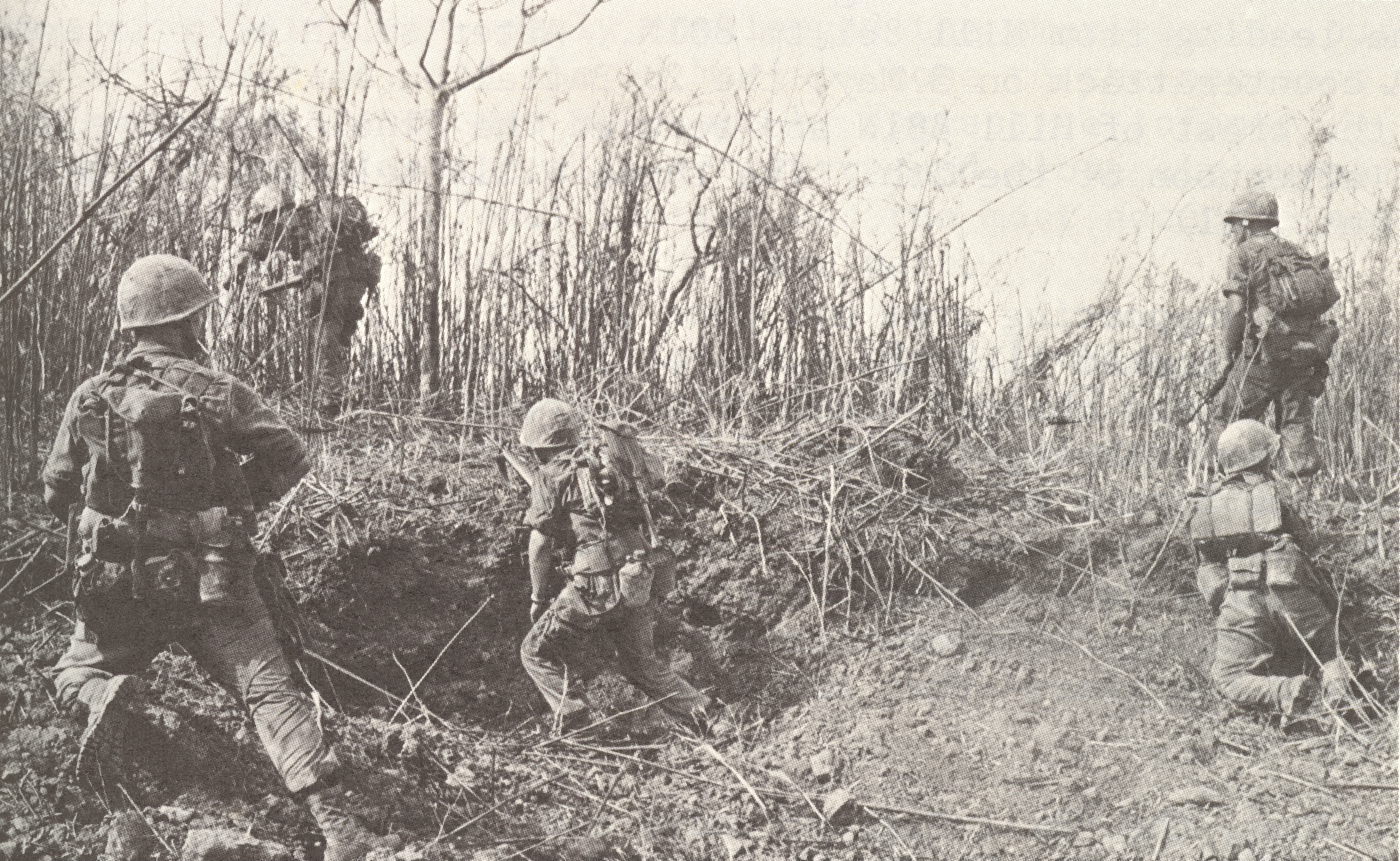
2nd Battalion in action during the Battle of Khe Sanh

3rd Marines was one of the first Marine units into South Vietnam when it provided security for the Da Nang Air Base in early 1965. Ultimately, 3rd Marines participated in 48 major operations in the Republic of Vietnam.

The regiment departed South Vietnam in October 1969 and was initially relocated to Marine Corps Base Camp Pendleton, California and assigned to the 5th Marine Amphibious Brigade. During April 1971, the regiment became part of the 1st Marine Division. Two months later, the regiment was moved to Marine Corps Air Station Kaneohe Bay, Hawaii, to assume the role of the ground combat component of the 1st Marine Brigade.

=== 1980s & 1990s ===
==== Task Force Taro ====
3rd Marines was one of the first combat forces to deploy to Saudi Arabia in response to the Iraqi invasion of Kuwait on 2 August 1990. The regiment, which became known as Task Force Taro in honor of the state and people of Hawaii, became the first American unit to be engaged by Iraqi artillery, rocket and missile fire on 18 January 1991. They countered the Iraqi supporting attacks by conducting artillery raids into Kuwait as the first ground offensive actions of the war. Task force Taro was instrumental in the recapture of Khafji, was the first unit to advance into Kuwait, conducted the only heliborne assault of the war and secured the Marine Corps' final objective of the war, Kuwait International Airport.

Following the cease-fire on 28 February 1991, the regiment redeployed to Saudi Arabia and subsequently completed its strategic redeployment to Hawaii two months later.

=== 2000s ===
After the September 11 terrorist attacks, the 3rd Marines deployed to both Iraq and Afghanistan. One of its officers, Stephen J. Boada, was awarded the Silver Star for actions there. He became the first Marine in the regiment and from Hawaii to be awarded one of the major awards for valor since the Vietnam War. An NCO from 1st Battalion, 3rd Marines, Cpl Kristopher Kane, was later awarded a Silver Star for actions during the Second Battle of Fallujah.

The Regiment deployed to Afghanistan in late 2008 as Special Purpose Marine Air Ground Task Force - Afghanistan (SPMAGTF-A). They became Regimental Combat Team 3 during Operation Khanjar in Helmand Province. They returned to Helmand from late 2009 through May 2010, when it participated in Operation Moshtarak.

=== 2020s ===
The Commandant announced a new program to forward deploy small maneuvering units called Marine Littoral Regiments to the South Pacific to counter China's aggressive policies in the region. The 3rd Regiment will be first to take part in the program. The Coast Guard could also be a potential partner in this program. On the 3 March 2022 the unit transitioned from 3rd Marine Regiment to 3rd Marine Littoral Regiment. This transition signaled a shift in the Marine Corps doctrine in the Pacific. In November 2024, the 3rd MLR received the NMESIS system for coastal defense, and was deployed with the new system to the Luzon Strait during exercise Balikatan 2025.

== Honors ==
- Presidential Unit Citation Streamer with Two Bronze Stars
  - World War II - Guam, 1944
  - Vietnam - 1965-1967
  - Afghanistan - 2009
- Navy Unit Commendation Streamer with Three Bronze Stars
  - World War II - Bougainville, 1943
  - Vietnam - 1968
  - Southwest Asia - 1990-1991
  - Southwest Asia - 2001-2003
- Marine Corps Expeditionary Streamer
- World War I Victory Streamer with "West Indies" Clasp
- Asiatic Pacific Campaign Streamer with Four Bronze Stars
- World War II Victory Streamer
- Navy Occupation Service Streamer with "Asia"
- China Service Streamer
- National Defense Service Streamer with Three Bronze Stars
- Korean Service Streamer
- Vietnam Service Streamer with Two Silver Stars
- Southwest Asia Service Streamer with Two Bronze Stars
- Afghanistan Campaign Streamer with Three Bronze Stars
- Iraq Campaign Streamer with Three Bronze Stars
- Global War on Terrorism Expeditionary Streamer
- Vietnam Cross of Gallantry with Palm

== See also ==
- Organization of the United States Marine Corps
- List of United States Marine Corps regiments
