= Agana race riot =

1944 race riot in Agana, Guam

The Agana Race Riot (December 24–26, 1944) took place in Agana, Guam, as the result of internal disputes between white and black United States Marines. The riot was one of the most serious incidents between African-American and white military personnel in the United States Armed Forces during World War II.

== Background ==
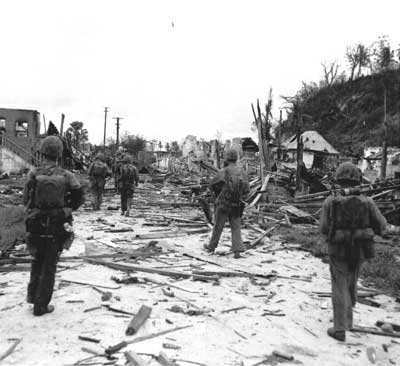
3rd Battalion, 3rd Marines enter the ruins of Agana, July 1944

In July 1944, the 3rd Marine Division and 77th Infantry Division sought to recapture Guam from the Japanese Army in a military campaign that cost 1,783 American lives and wounded 6,010 men. After the battle, the Allies developed Guam as a base of operations. Five large airfields were built by Seabees. B-29 bombers were flown from the island to attack targets in the western Pacific and mainland Japan. Guam continued as a station for the 3rd Marine Division. Racial tensions heightened in late August when the African American Marine 25th Depot Company arrived to start loading operations at the newly constructed naval supply depot. White Americans of the 3rd Marine Division, some new to the area, tried to prevent African American Marines from visiting nearby Agana and its women.

Over the next three months, racially motivated incidents and a pervasive pattern of discrimination caused tensions to rise between the two groups. A white American sailor shot and killed a "black Marine of the 25th Depot Company in a quarrel over a woman; and a sentry from the 27th Marine Depot Company reacted to harassment by fatally wounding his tormentor, a white Marine." Both men were eventually court-martialed for voluntary manslaughter. A race riot erupted on Christmas Eve 1944 when rumors spread that another African American sailor had been shot and killed by a white Marine.

== First confrontation ==
On December 24, a group of nine African American Marines from the 25th Depot Company had been given 24-hour holiday passes (for exemplary service) to go into Agana, Guam. While they were in the city, white Marines opened fire on the men when they saw them talking to Chamoru women. The black Marines escaped, and eight returned safely to their depot, but one was missing. In response, 40 black Marines loaded into two trucks and drove back to Agana to find the missing man. At the same time, an African American Marine—who remained at the base—called the military police (MP), warning them that the black Marines were on their way. The MPs proceeded to erect barricades across all the roads leading into Agana.

When the trucks arrived at a roadblock, a standoff began. Eventually, tensions were calmed after a military police officer informed the black Marines that the missing man was found safe and returned to the 25th's camp. Satisfied, they turned their trucks around and returned to base. Around midnight on Christmas morning, a truck filled with armed white Marines drove into the segregated African American camp and claimed that one of their Marines had been hit with a piece of coral thrown by someone from that camp. The standoff ended after the depot's commanding officer ordered the white Marines to leave.

== Escalation ==
Racial tensions continued on Christmas Day when an African-American Marine walking back to camp from Agana was shot dead by two drunk white Marines. Within hours, another black Marine was shot and killed by another drunken white Marine in Agana. Reports of the shootings reached the African-American company. After midnight on the early morning of December 26, a jeep with white Marines opened fire on the African American depot. Camp guards returned fire, injuring a white MP officer. The white Marines in the jeep took cover and fled toward Agana, chased by a group of armed black Marines.

The black Marines were stopped by white MPs at a roadblock outside Agana. They were arrested and charged with unlawful assembly, rioting, theft of government property, and attempted murder.

== Aftermath ==
Major General Henry Louis Larsen convened a court of inquiry to investigate the riot. Walter Francis White, executive director of the National Association for the Advancement of Colored People (NAACP), was in Guam and participated in fact-finding during the investigation. He learned of the pervasive discrimination and harassment directed against the black Marines and testified to these incidents.

Forty-three Marines were court-martialed, convicted and received prison terms of several years. Because of White's work, some white Marines were also charged and convicted for their part in the disturbances. The NAACP later successfully campaigned with the Department of the Navy and ultimately the White House to have the black Marines' guilty verdicts overturned, and they were released from prison in 1946.
