= Operation Virginia Ridge =

Part of the Vietnam War (1969)

- Part of the Vietnam War
Date	2 May – 16 July 1969
Location	Quảng Trị Province, South Vietnam 16.85°N 106.84°E
Result	US claims operational success

Belligerents
United States	North Vietnam

Commanders and leaders
Col. Paul D. Lafond; Col. Wilbur F. Simlik	Unknown

Units involved
3rd Marine Regiment	27th Regiment; 36th Regiment; 33rd Sapper Battalion

Casualties and losses
106 killed	560 killed 17 captured 141 individual and 34 crew-served weapons recovered

Operation Virginia Ridge was a US Marine Corps operation that took place in northwest Quảng Trị Province, South Vietnam, from 2 May to 16 July 1969.

== Background ==
In early May 1969, U.S. reconnaissance detected that two People's Army of Vietnam (PAVN) Regiments, the 27th and 36th, were infiltrating through the Vietnamese Demilitarized Zone (DMZ) into the central section of Quảng Trị Province. The 3rd Marine Regiment under Colonel Paul D. Lafond was given the mission of engaging both regiments, preventing any threat to Route 9 and protecting the rice harvest.

== Operation ==
The operation began on 2 May 1969 with the 1st Battalion, 3rd Marines landed by helicopter at Landing Zone Sparrow (16.868°N 106.933°E), 8 km northwest of Cam Lộ Combat Base meeting light resistance. The 3rd Battalion, 3rd Marines secured Firebase Fuller and Firebase Pete (16.801°N 106.855°E) north of Elliot Combat Base and then swept towards the DMZ. The 2nd Battalion, 3rd Marines secured Con Thien and the surrounding area. By 6 May, 1/3 Marines had swept 3 km west of LZ Sparrow along Mutter's Ridge. On the early morning of 10 May an estimated PAVN platoon attacked Company D, 1/4 Marines' night defensive position, killing eight Marines and wounding ten in just ten minutes.

On 16 May, Company M encountered a small entrenched PAVN force killing four and capturing one. For the remainder of May, the 1/3 and 3/3 Marines swept east towards the A-4 Strongpoint (16.9067°N 106.984°E) meeting limited resistance. On 20 May, an estimated force of 20 PAVN attacked Company C's night defensive position losing 15 killed for the loss of three Marine dead and eight wounded. On 22 May Company B ambushed a 30-man PAVN force killing 19 and capturing two. , On 6–7 June, several B-52 Arclight strikes were made against Mutter's Ridge, Foxtrot Ridge and Helicopter Valley with 2/3 Marines deployed soon after by helicopter to conduct bomb damage assessment. The marines found numerous destroyed bunkers but few enemy dead.

In mid-June, the 3rd Marines received intelligence that a PAVN force was infiltrating from the DMZ near Gio Linh District. On 16 June, the 3/3 Marines loaded onto trucks and were driven up Route 1 towards the DMZ at night. As they did so, they encountered the PAVN 27th Regiment and 33rd Sapper Battalion moving south along the roadside. The marines engaged the PAVN force, pushing them into the defenses at the Charlie-1 (16.877°N 107.077°E) position, where 56 PAVN dead were found the following morning. 3/3 Marines swept south from Gio Linh towards Con Thien killing 20 PAVN in two separate engagements before midday on 17 June. At 14:00, an estimated PAVN company attacked the 3/3 Marines' command position but were forced back with the loss of 37 dead and three captured. Company L moving to support the command group engaged an entrenched PAVN position killing eight. Aerial observers called in artillery and airstrikes against PAVN forces throughout the day with the final tally being 193 PAVN killed and nine captured for the loss of 19 Marines killed and 28 wounded.

Lafond was relieved as commanding officer, 3rd Marine Regiment by Colonel Wilbur F. Simlik on 28 June 1969.

== Aftermath ==
Operation Virginia Ridge concluded on 16 July and was followed by Operation Idaho Canyon. U.S. losses were 106 killed while the PAVN lost 560 killed and 17 captured and 141 individual and 34 crew-served weapons captured.
