= Firebase Fuller =

Site information
- Type: Army

Location
- Coordinates: 16.811°N 106.890°E

Site history
- Built: 1969
- In use: 1969–1972
- Battles/wars: Vietnam War; Easter Offensive

Garrison information
- Occupants: 3rd Battalion 9th Marines; 2nd Battalion, 4th Marines; 1st Brigade, 5th Infantry Division (Mechanized); 2nd Battalion, 2nd Infantry Regiment

Firebase Fuller (also known as Dong Ha Mountain or Hill 549) is a former U.S. Marine Corps, Army and Army of the Republic of Vietnam (ARVN) firebase in central Vietnam.

== History ==
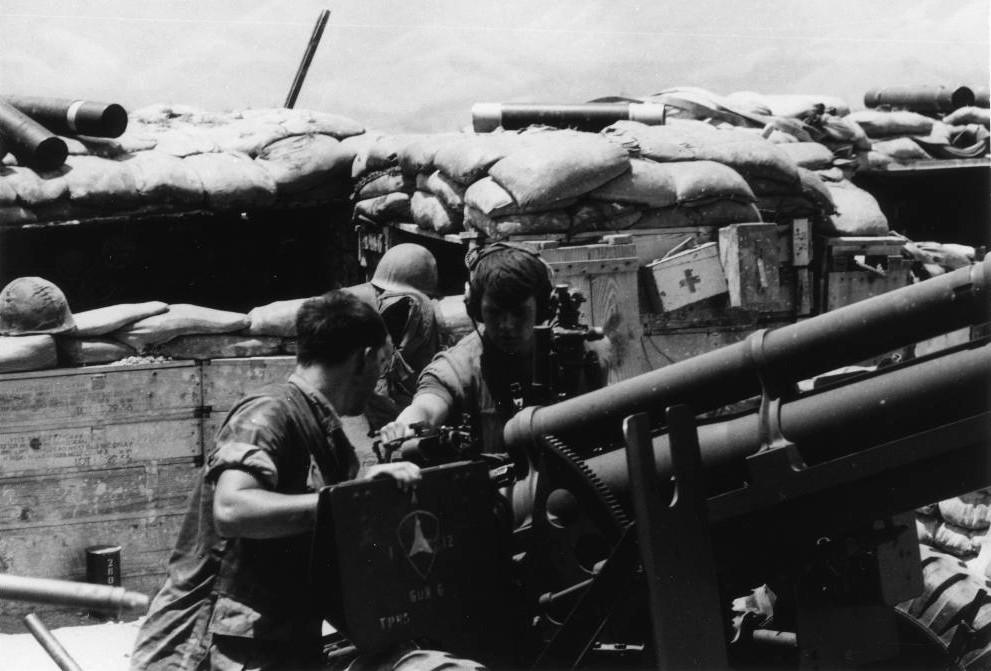
Battery A, 1/12 Marines prepare to fire their 105mm gun in 1969

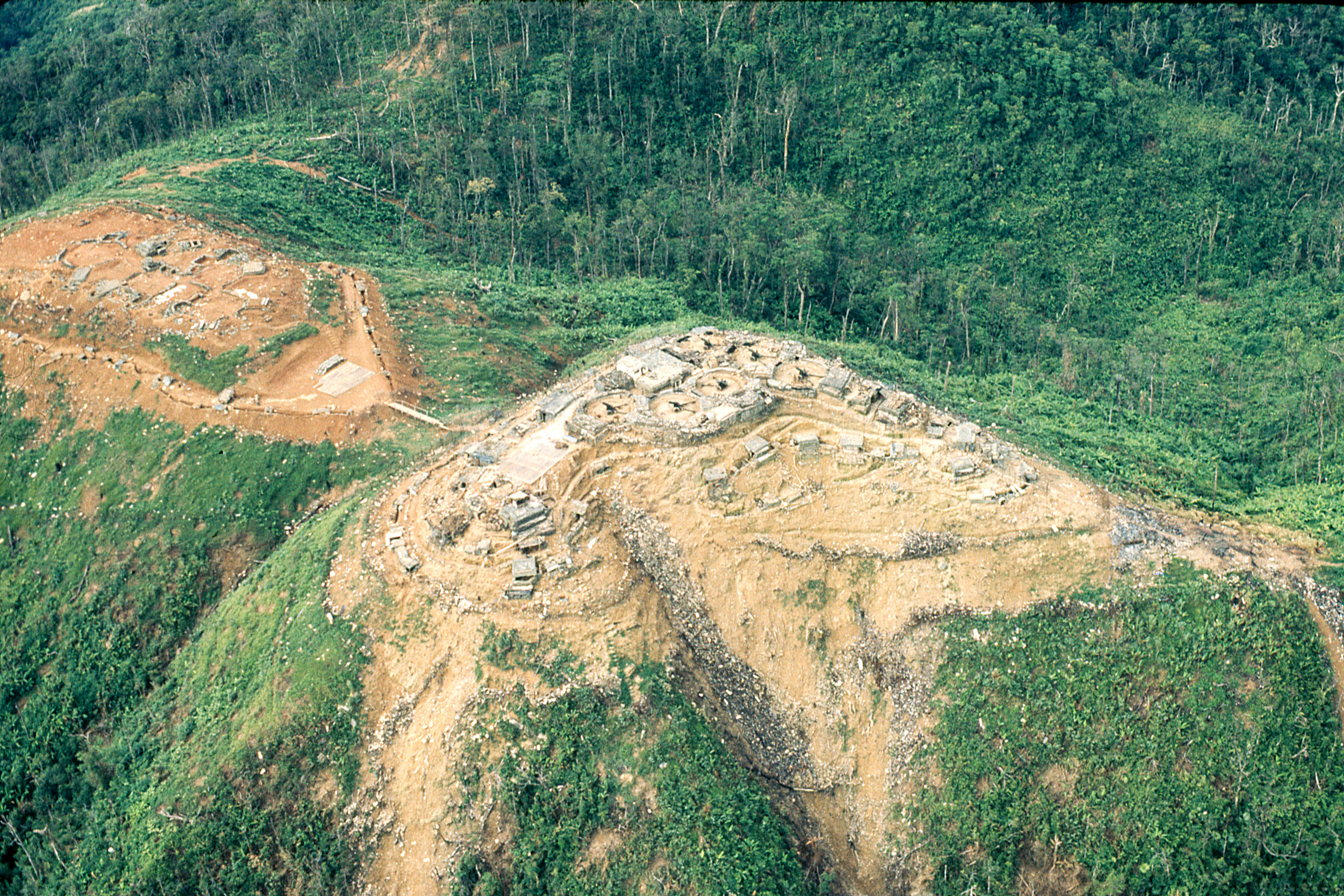
Fire Support Fuller before June 1971 siege, looking north.

The base was established on Dong Ha Mountain northeast of The Rockpile north of Highway 9 during Operation Lancaster II.

The 3rd Battalion 9th Marines secured Fuller as part of Operation Virginia Ridge on 2 May 1969. By July the 1st Battalion 9th Marines had assumed responsibility of the area around Fuller. Alpha Battery, 1st Battalion 12th Marines provided artillery support at Fuller from May 1969 until September 1969 when the battery was withdrawn to Okinawa.

In late September 1969 as part of Operation Keystone Cardinal the 3rd Marine Regiment began its withdrawal from South Vietnam handing over control of Fuller to the 2nd Battalion, 4th Marines. The 4th Marines in turn handed over Fuller to elements of the 1st Brigade, 5th Infantry Division (Mechanized) on 5 November 1969.

On 30 April 1970 at 00:55 a unit of the 1st Brigade at Fuller received mortar fire followed by an attack by People's Army of Vietnam (PAVN) sappers. The defenders returned fire supported by artillery and helicopter gunships and the PAVN withdrew leaving 16 dead.

On 16 August 1970 a unit of the ARVN 2nd Battalion, 2nd Regiment at Fuller was hit by seventy 120 mm mortar rounds, killing 14 ARVN and destroying 20 bunkers.

=== 1971 ===
On 3 June PAVN mortars hit South Vietnamese Marines at the base, killing six, while the Marines claimed nine PAVN killed. On 24 June the PAVN overran the base and were then subjected to an intense aerial bombardment before three ARVN battalions were flown in by helicopters of the U.S. 101st Airborne to recapture the area around the base. On 28 June ARVN troops reoccupied the base, but it was soon abandoned due to the damage sustained in the fighting. The South Vietnamese claimed that 496 PAVN had been killed at Fuller for the loss of 29 marines/ARVN. The ARVN with U.S. assistance then rebuilt the base with concrete bunkers by mid-July and it easily withstood a new PAVN mortar attack on 19 July.

=== 1972 ===
By January 1972 the ARVN 3rd Division had assumed responsibility for the area north of Highway 9. Fuller was occupied by the 1st Battalion, 2nd ARVN Regiment. From January the ARVN on Fuller together with the Vietnamese Marines on Firebase Sarge reported a buildup on PAVN forces in the surrounding area.

The PAVN launched their Easter Offensive on 30 March 1972 and PAVN artillery fire hit Fuller along with all other ARVN and Marine positions along the DMZ. Units of the PAVN 308th Division assaulted Fuller and by midday on 31 March the PAVN had overrun Fuller.

== Current use ==
The base has reverted to jungle.
