= Operation Keystone Cardinal =

Operation Keystone Cardinal was the withdrawal of the 3rd Marine Division from South Vietnam, taking place from 30 September to 27 November 1969.

== Background ==
Following the withdrawal of the 9th Marine Regiment from South Vietnam in Operation Keystone Eagle, planning began for the withdrawal of the remaining units of 3rd Marine Division in line with the plans prepared by MACV.

== Operation ==
The Keystone Cardinal redeployments took place as follows:

Departure Date	Unit	Strength	Destination
30 September 1969	Detachment, Headquarters, III Marine Amphibious Force	70	Camp Pendleton
30 September 1969	OOCNE	724	Camp Pendleton
2 October 1969	Company B, 3rd Engineer Battalion	159	Camp Pendleton
2 October 1969	Company C, 3rd Medical Battalion	24	Camp Pendleton
2 October 1969	1st Battalion, 12th Marines	662	Camp Pendleton
2 October 1969	Company B, 3rd Shore Party Battalion	82	Camp Pendleton
2 October 1969	Company B, 9th Motor Transport Battalion	91	Camp Pendleton
4 October 1969	3rd Bridge Company	102	Camp Pendleton
4 October 1969	Detachment, 11th Engineer Battalion	622	Camp Pendleton
4 October 1969	Company B, 3rd Motor Transport Battalion	68	Camp Pendleton
4 October 1969	Company A, 3rd Reconnaissance Battalion	143	Camp Pendleton
6 October 1969	1st Battalion, 3rd Marines	1166	Camp Pendleton
6 October 1969	2nd Battalion, 3rd Marines	1166	Camp Pendleton
6 October 1969	Detachment, 3rd Battalion, 12th Marines	91	Camp Pendleton
6 October 1969	Detachment, Headquarters Battery, 12th Marine Regiment	61	Camp Pendleton
6 October 1969	Detachment, Headquarters, 3rd Marine Division	436	Camp Pendleton
6 October 1969	Detachment, 4th Battalion, 12th Marines	150	Camp Pendleton
6 October 1969	Detachment, Headquarters Company, 3rd Marine Regiment	24	Camp Pendleton
6 October 1969	Detachment, Force Logistics Command (FLC)	400	Camp Pendleton
6 October 1969	Detachment, 7th Communication Battalion	193	Camp Pendleton
6 October 1969	Detachment, 2nd Battalion, 4th Marines	118	Camp Pendleton
6 October 1969	Detachment, 3rd Battalion, 4th Marines	118	Camp Pendleton
6 October 1969	Detachment, Headquarters Company, 4th Marine Regiment	100	Camp Pendleton
6 October 1969	Detachment, 1st Special Security Communications Team (SSCT)	4	Camp Pendleton
6 October 1969	OOCNE	14	Camp Pendleton
6 October 1969	OOCNE	123	Camp Pendleton
6 October 1969	Detachment, VMO-6	8	Camp Pendleton
6 October 1969	Detachment, HMM-164	8	Camp Pendleton
6 October 1969	Detachment, Marine Air Base Squadron 36 (MABS-36)	89	Camp Pendleton
6 October 1969	Detachment, Headquarters & Maintenance Squadron 36 (H&MS-36)	164	Camp Pendleton
6 October 1969	Detachment, Marine Air Base Squadron 11 (MABS-11)	20	Camp Pendleton
6 October 1969	Detachment, Marine Air Base Squadron 12 (MABS-12)	20	Camp Pendleton
6 October 1969	Detachment, Marine Air Base Squadron 13 (MABS-13)	20	Camp Pendleton
6 October 1969	Detachment, Marine Air Base Squadron 16 (MABS-16)	22	Camp Pendleton
7 October 1969	Headquarters Company, 3rd Marine Regiment	230	Camp Pendleton
7 October 1969	3rd Battalion, 3rd Marines	1166	Camp Pendleton
7 October 1969	Detachment, 1st Battalion, 4th Marines	118	Camp Pendleton
7 October 1969	HMM-265	249	Camp Pendleton
7 October 1969	VMA-533	304	Camp Pendleton
7 October 1969	Detachment, Headquarters & Maintenance Squadron 12 (H&MS-12)	69	Japan
20 October 1969	7th Communication Battalion	190	Okinawa
20 October 1969	3rd Motor Transport Battalion	20	Okinawa
20 October 1969	Platoon, 3rd Bridge Company	21	Okinawa
20 October 1969	Headquarters Battery, 12th Marine Regiment	100	Okinawa
20 October 1969	HMM-164	258	Okinawa
20 October 1969	HMH-462	233	Okinawa
22 October 1969	1st Battalion, 4th Marines	1048	Okinawa
22 October 1969	Detachment, Headquarters Battalion, 3rd Marine Division	200	Okinawa
22 October 1969	VMO-6	234	Okinawa
22 October 1969	Detachment, VMO-6	32	Okinawa
23 October 1969	Battery G, 3rd Battalion, 12th Marines	133	Okinawa
23 October 1969	3rd Engineer Battalion	341	Okinawa
23 October 1969	3rd Tank Battalion	345	Okinawa
3 November 1969	15th CIT	16	Okinawa
3 November 1969	Detachment, H&HS-18	18	Japan
4 November 1969	9th Motor Transport Battalion	88	Okinawa
5 November 1969	3rd Battalion, 12th Marines	328	Okinawa
5 November 1969	17th Interrogator Translator Team (ITT)	11	Okinawa
5 November 1969	11th ITT	6	Okinawa
5 November 1969	9th ITT	6	Okinawa
6 November 1969	Headquarters Company, 4th Marine Regiment	130	Okinawa
6 November 1969	Company B, 3rd Tank Battalion	140	Okinawa
7 November 1969	H&MS-36	324	Okinawa
8 November 1969	1st SSCT	6	Okinawa
8 November 1969	Detachment, MASS-2	39	Okinawa
9 November 1969	2nd Battalion, 4th Marines	1048	Okinawa
9 November 1969	Headquarters Battalion, 3rd Marine Division	308	Okinawa
9 November 1969	Detachment, Headquarters Battery, 12th Marine Regiment	83	Okinawa
10 November 1969	Battery K, 4th Battalion, 12th Marines	100	Okinawa
10 November 1969	3rd Shore Party Battalion	228	Okinawa
19 November 1969	4th Battalion, 12th Marines	152	Okinawa
20 November 1969	3rd Battalion, 4th Marines	1048	Okinawa
21 November 1969	11th Engineer Battalion	103	Okinawa
22 November 1969	Company C, 9th Motor Transport Battalion	83	Okinawa
23 November 1969	MABS-36	318	Okinawa
23 November 1969	MASS-2	123	Japan
24 November 1969	Detachment, MABS-36	87	Japan
24 November 1969	Detachment, Headquarters Battalion, 3rd Marine Division	200	Okinawa
24 November 1969	3rd Medical Battalion	86	Okinawa
24 November 1969	3rd Dental Company	3	Okinawa
24 November 1969	7th ITT	11	Okinawa
27 November 1969	Battery H, 3rd Battalion, 12th Marines	110	Okinawa

== Aftermath ==
Operation Keystone Cardinal concluded on 27 November 1969.
