= James Anderson Jr. =

U.S. Marine; posthumous Medal of Honor recipient for service in Vietnam (1967)

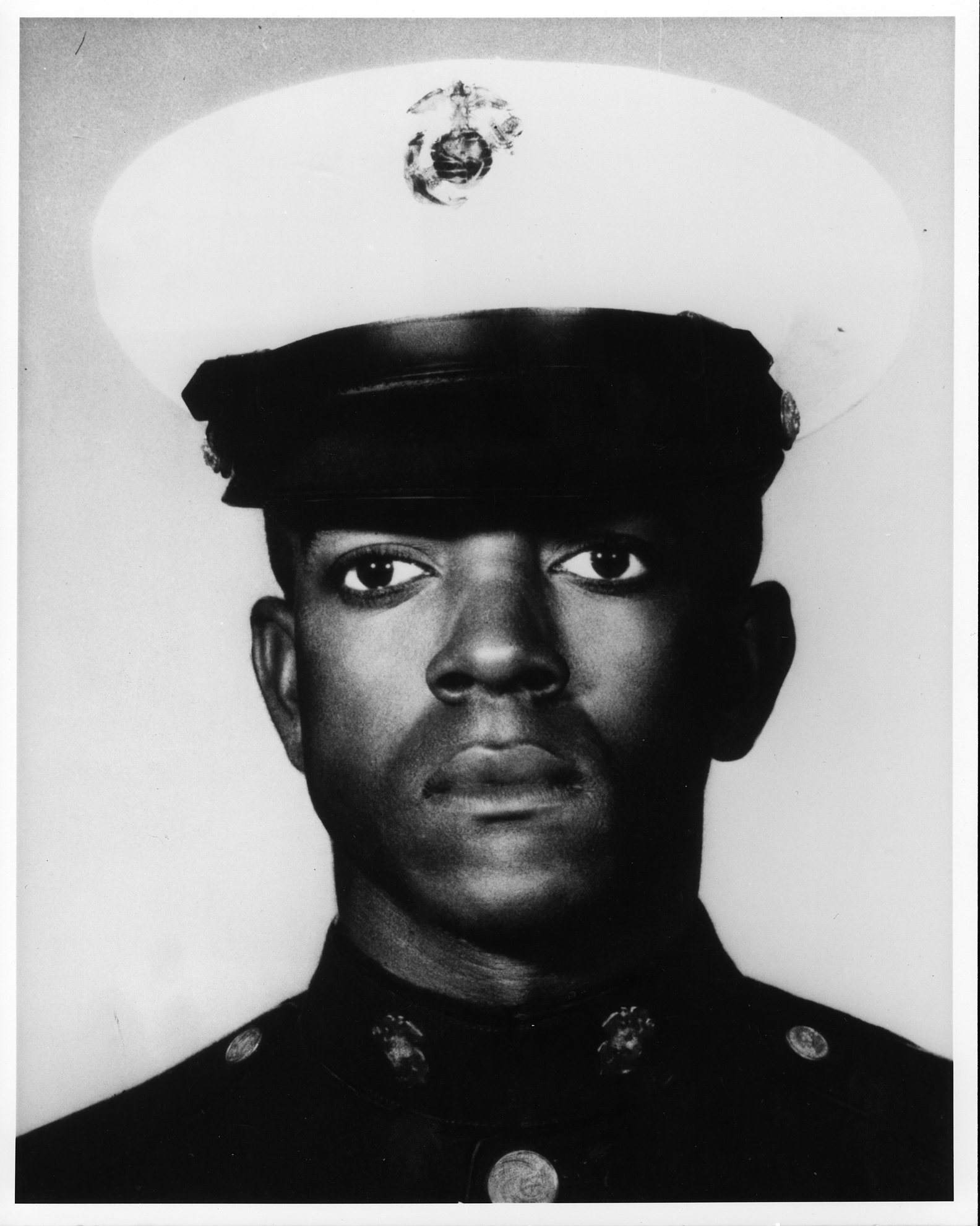
- James Anderson Jr., Medal of Honor recipient
- Born: January 22, 1947; Los Angeles, California, US
- Died: February 28, 1967 (aged 20) † near Cam Lo Combat Base, Quang Tri Province, Vietnam
- Burial place: Lincoln Memorial Park in Carson, California
- Military career
- Allegiance: United States of America
- Branch: United States Marine Corps
- Service years: 1966–1967
- Rank: Private First Class
- Units: Company F, 2nd Battalion, 3rd Marines, 3rd Marine Division
- Conflicts: Vietnam War: Operation Prairie III †
- Awards: Medal of Honor; Purple Heart

Private First Class James Anderson Jr. (January 22, 1947 – February 28, 1967) was a United States Marine who posthumously received the Medal of Honor for heroism while serving in Vietnam in February 1967. When his Medal of Honor was awarded on August 21, 1968, he became the first African American U.S. Marine recipient of the Medal of Honor while serving in Vietnam.

Joining the U. S. Marine Corps in 1966, Anderson took part in Operation Prairie II. During this operation, his platoon was advancing through the jungle near Cam Lo Combat Base when they were ambushed by North Vietnamese forces. Anderson jumped on a grenade thrown by a Vietnamese soldier and was killed in action. This action saved other Marines' lives, and Anderson was posthumously awarded the Medal of Honor for his deed.

== Biography ==
Anderson was born on January 22, 1947, in Los Angeles, California. He was one of seven siblings. After graduating from senior high school, Anderson attended Los Angeles Harbor Junior College for a year and a half. He was preparing to realize his dream of becoming a preacher at Belmont Baptist Church, a local church.

Private Anderson left college to enlist in the United States Marine Corps on February 17, 1966, and received recruit training with the 1st Recruit Training Battalion, Marine Corps Recruit Depot, San Diego, California. He was promoted to private first class upon graduation from recruit training in August 1966. Private First Class Anderson was then transferred to Camp Pendleton, California, where he received further training with the 2nd Battalion, 2nd Infantry Training Regiment.

In December 1966, Private First Class Anderson arrived in the Republic of Vietnam, where he served as a rifleman with Company F, 2nd Battalion, 3rd Marines, 3rd Marine Division in Quang Tri Province. On February 28, 1967, during Operation Prairie II, Private First Class Anderson was killed when he covered a grenade with his body to save his platoon.

Private First Class Anderson was interred at Lincoln Memorial Park in Carson, California (Plot L-6).

== Decorations ==
A complete list of Private First Class Anderson's medals and decorations includes: the Medal of Honor, the Purple Heart, the National Defense Service Medal, the Vietnam Service Medal with one bronze star, the Vietnamese Military Merit Medal, the Vietnamese Gallantry Cross with Palm, and the Republic of Vietnam Campaign Medal.

	Medal of Honor	
Purple Heart	National Defense Service Medal	Vietnam Service Medal with one bronze star
Vietnam Military Merit Medal	Vietnam Gallantry Cross with palm	Vietnam Campaign Medal

=== Medal of Honor citation ===
The President of the United States takes pride in presenting the MEDAL OF HONOR posthumously to

PRIVATE FIRST CLASS JAMES ANDERSON JR.
UNITED STATES MARINE CORPS

for service as set forth in the following CITATION:

For conspicuous gallantry and intrepidity at the risk of his life above and beyond the call of duty as a rifleman, Second Platoon, Company F, Second Battalion, Third Marines, Third Marine Division, in Vietnam on 28 February 1967. Company F was advancing in dense jungle northwest of Cam Lộ in an effort to extract a heavily besieged reconnaissance patrol. Private First Class Anderson's platoon was the lead element and had advanced only about 200 meters when they were brought under extremely intense enemy small arms and automatic weapons fire. The platoon reacted swiftly, getting on line as best they could in the thick terrain, and began returning fire. Private First Class Anderson found himself tightly bunched together with the other members of the platoon only 20 meters from the enemy positions. As the fire fight continued several of the men were wounded by the deadly enemy assault. Suddenly, an enemy grenade landed in the midst of the Marines and rolled alongside Private First Class Anderson's head. Unhesitatingly and with complete disregard for his own personal safety, he reached out, grasped the grenade, pulled it to his chest and curled around it as it went off. Although several Marines received shrapnel from the grenade, his body absorbed the major force of the explosion. In this singularly heroic act, Private First Class Anderson saved his comrades from serious injury and possible death. His personal heroism, extraordinary valor, and inspirational supreme self-sacrifice reflected great credit upon himself and the Marine Corps and upheld the highest traditions of the United States Naval Service. He gallantly gave his life for his country.

/S/ LYNDON B. JOHNSON

== Commemorations ==
The United States Navy prepositioning ship MV PFC James Anderson Jr. (AK-3002) is named in honor of Medal of Honor recipient James Anderson Jr.

The name James Anderson Jr. is inscribed on the Vietnam Veterans Memorial ("The Wall") on Panel 15E - Row 112.

James Anderson Jr. Memorial Park in Carson, California, at the corner of Wilmington and University was named after James Anderson Jr.

Anderson Hall on Marine Corps Base Hawaii, home to PFC Anderson's Marine unit, was dedicated in his honor in 1972.

Anderson Avenue in Compton, California, is named after him.

The Downlow Saga, a 2017 novel by author Sheldon McCormick, is dedicated in memory of Anderson.

== See also ==
- List of Medal of Honor recipients
- List of Medal of Honor recipients for the Vietnam War
