= Firebase Khe Gio =

Site information
- Type: Marines/Army

Location
- Coordinates: 16.783°N 106.899°E

Site history
- Built: 1966
- In use: 1966–72
- Battles/wars: Vietnam War

Garrison information
- Occupants: 3rd Marine Division

Firebase Khe Gio (also known as Đầu Mầu Bridge or Khe Gio Bridge) is a former U.S. Marines and Army of the Republic of Vietnam (ARVN) firebase west of Cam Lộ in central Vietnam.

== History ==
The base was established along Route 9 6.5 km west of Cam Lộ and 2 km east of The Rockpile to protect the vital Khe Gio Bridge over the Song Khe Gio, a north-south tributary of the Cam Lo River.

During Operation Prairie on 17 August 1966 Company H, 2nd Battalion, 3rd Marines conducted a reconnaissance in force along Route 9 west of Cam Lộ. At midday, Marine aircraft bombed Hill 252 which overhung Route 9 near the bridge. The Marines moved forward but came under fire from a People's Army of Vietnam (PAVN) bunker dug into Hill 252. The Marines called in airstrikes and two M-48 tanks moved from Cam Lộ to support the Marines, total casualties were 2 Marines and an estimated 20 PAVN killed. On the morning of 18 August the Marines renewed their attack taking Hill 252 and killing a further 3 PAVN.

In June 1968 base security was the responsibility of the 1st Battalion, 3rd Marines. During 1968 the 11th Engineer Battalion constructed a new bridge at Khe Gio.

In May 1969 the base was occupied by elements of the 2nd Battalion, 9th Marines. By July the 1st Battalion, 3rd Marines had assumed responsibility for the area. In September 1969 as part of Operation Keystone Cardinal the 3rd Marine Division began its withdrawal from Vietnam. By early October the area was the responsibility of the 2nd Battalion, 4th Marines. In late October the Marines had handed over control of their tactical area of operations (including the Khe Gio Bridge) to the 1st Brigade, 5th Infantry Division.

By March 1970 the base was defended by elements of the ARVN 2nd Regiment and an M42 Duster of the 1st Battalion, 44th Artillery. On the early morning 12 March 1970 a PAVN force attacked the base resulting in two U.S., nine ARVN and 25 PAVN killed and one U.S. MIA. SGT Mitchell W. Stout would be posthumously awarded the Medal of Honor for his actions during the battle.

By January 1972 the ARVN 3rd Division had assumed responsibility for the area north of Highway 9. On 1 April 1972 at the start of the PAVN's Easter Offensive the ARVN 56th Regiment was replacing the ARVN 2nd Regiment at Khe Gio, Camp Carroll and Firebase Fuller. The PAVN were able to take advantage of this change of forces and seize Khe Gio.

== Current use ==
The base has reverted to jungle.
