= Operation Prairie III =

Part of the Vietnam War (1967)

- Part of the Vietnam War
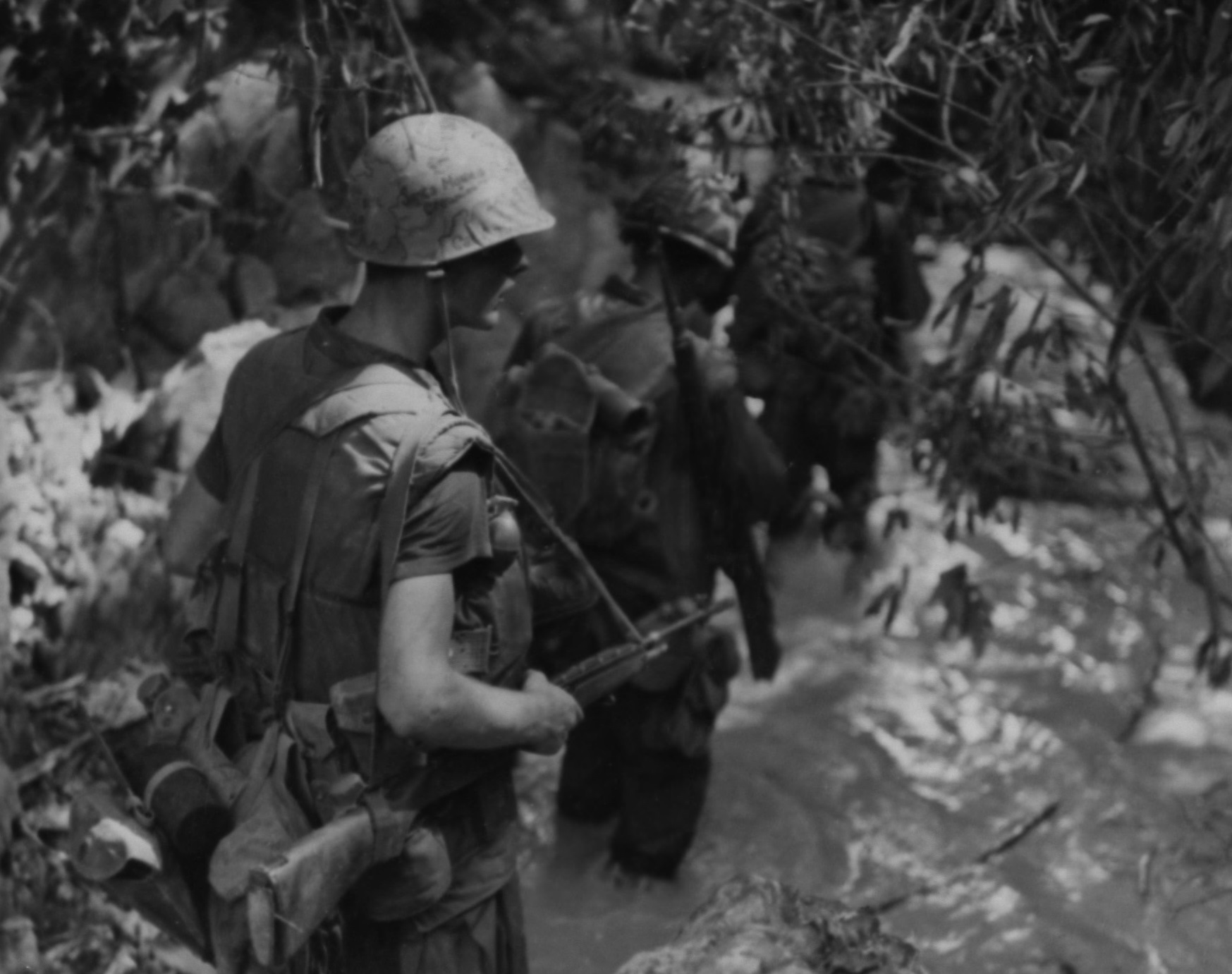
- Marines of Company A, 1st Battalion 9th Marines move through a stream during Operation Prairie III
Date	19 March – 19 April 1967
Location	Vietnamese Demilitarized Zone
Result	US operational success

Belligerents
United States	North Vietnam

Commanders and leaders
MG Wood B. Kyle; BG Michael P. Ryan	

Units involved
3rd Battalion, 3rd Marines; 3rd Battalion, 4th Marines; 1st Battalion, 9th Marines; 3rd Battalion, 9th Marines	324B Division

Casualties and losses
56 killed	252 killed 4 captured

Operation Prairie III was a U.S. Marine Corps operation in Quảng Trị Province, South Vietnam that sought to eliminate People's Army of Vietnam (PAVN) forces south of the Demilitarized Zone (DMZ) that took place from 19 March to 19 April 1967.

== Background ==
Operation Prairie III was essentially a continuation of the just-concluded Operation Prairie II in the same tactical area of operations (TAOR). 3rd Marine Division had five infantry battalions and four artillery battalions in the TAOR.

== Operation ==
On 20 March the PAVN hit Firebase Gio Linh with mortars, rockets and artillery fire and they continued to hit Gio Linh and Con Thien almost daily for the next two weeks. On 21 March the PAVN ambushed a supply convoy 300m south of Gio Linh destroying six trucks but they were driven off by the convoy's security escort and Company I, 3rd Battalion, 4th Marines which was providing base security at Gio Linh. That same day 3rd Battalion, 3rd Marines and 1st Battalion, 9th Marines completed a seven-day sweep 6 km (3.7 mi) north of Camp Carroll finding 125 rockets and numerous rocket and mortar sites.

From 20 to 28 March BLT 1st Battalion, 4th Marines conducted Operation Beacon Hill around Firebase Gio Linh, killing 334 PAVN for the loss of 29 Marines killed.

On 22 March 3/3 Marines and 1/9 Marines began a patrol from Đông Hà Combat Base north towards Con Thien. On 24 March the 1/9 Marines engaged an entrenched PAVN force southeast of Con Thien and after two hours of fighting the PAVN withdrew leaving 33 dead. Meanwhile, 3/3 Marines engaged an entrenched PAVN company forcing them to withdraw leaving 28 dead. The two Marine battalions pursued the retreating PAVN losing contact with them on 26 March as they crossed the DMZ.

On 28 March the 3/3 Marines and 1/9 Marines were replaced by the 3rd Battalion, 9th Marines which conducted patrols and night ambushes north of Cam Lộ Combat Base. On 30 March Company I, 3/9 Marines had established ambush positions 9.5 km (5.9 mi) northwest of Cam Lộ when the company command post and the 2nd platoon's position was attacked by the PAVN. The PAVN walked mortar fire across the position twice before launching a ground assault which was repulsed by artillery fire, attempts by the other platoons to provide support were driven back by machine gun fire. The PAVN then attacked the position again overrunning it, killing 16 Marines. The PAVN were then forced to retreat by helicopter gunship fire, leaving 67 dead and two captured. Second lieutenant John P. Bobo would be posthumously awarded the Medal of Honor for his actions during this battle.

== Aftermath ==
Operation Prairie III concluded on 19 April, the Marines had lost 56 killed and claiming that the PAVN suffered 252 killed and 4 captured.
