= Operation Prairie II =

Part of the Vietnam War (1967)

- Part of the Vietnam War
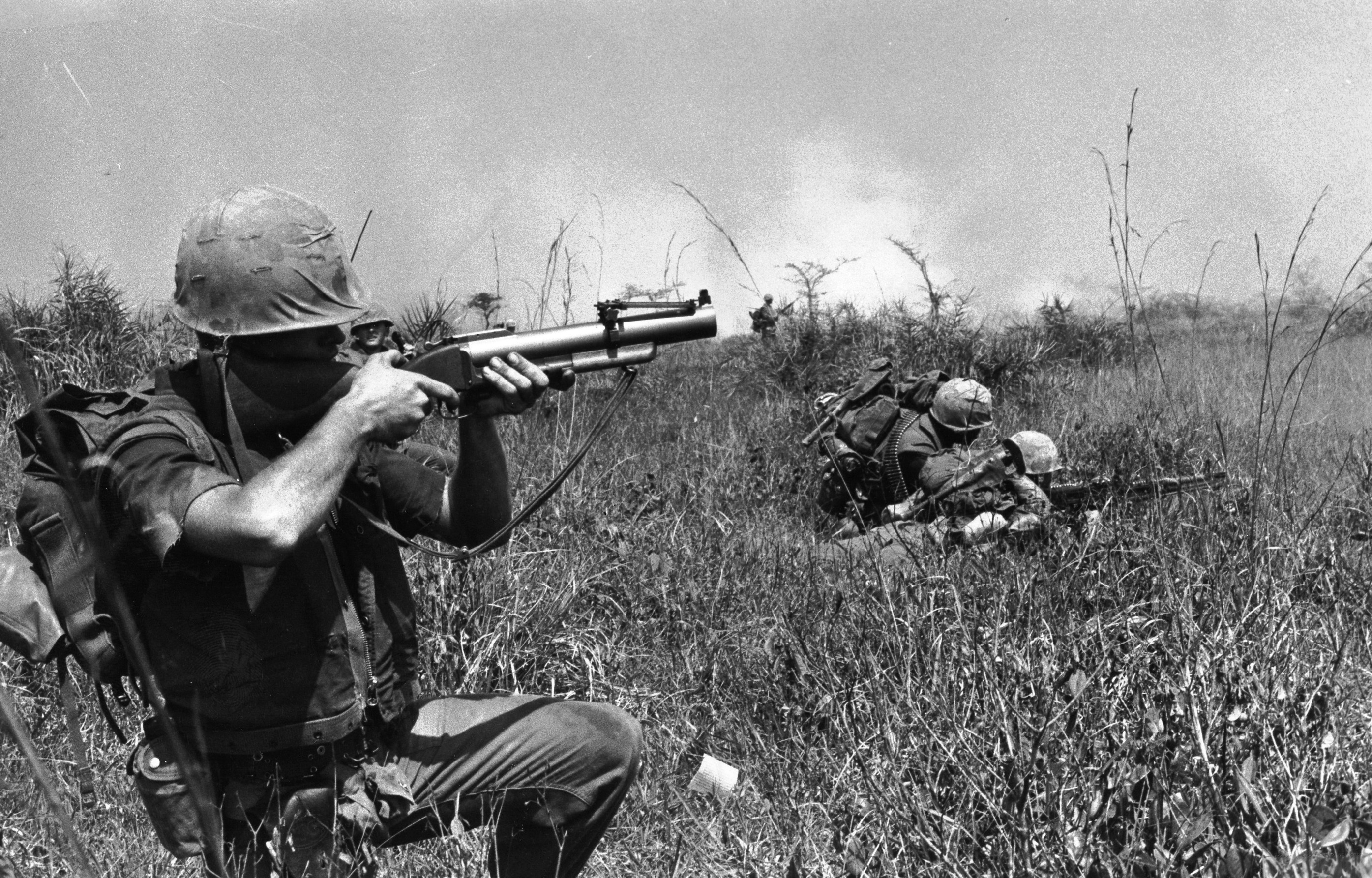
- Company A, 1/9 Marines in action near Cam Lộ, 3 March 1967
Date	1 February – 18 March 1967
Location	Vietnamese Demilitarized Zone

Belligerents
United States	North Vietnam

Commanders and leaders
MG Wood B. Kyle; BG Michael P. Ryan; Lt. Col. Victor Ohanesian †	

Units involved
2nd Battalion, 3rd Marines; 3rd Battalion, 3rd Marines; 3rd Battalion, 4th Marines; 1st Battalion, 9th Marines; 2nd Battalion, 9th Marines	324B Division

Casualties and losses
93 killed 1 missing	694 killed 20 captured 137 individual weapons recovered

Operation Prairie II was a U.S. military operation in Quảng Trị Province, South Vietnam that sought to eliminate People's Army of Vietnam (PAVN) forces south of the Demilitarized Zone (DMZ) that took place from 1 February to 18 March 1967.

The operation was characterized by scattered, limited engagements in the beginning and consistent bombardment of American positions towards the end. The United States considered the operation to be a success with 93 Marines killed, compared to 694 PAVN killed.

== Background ==
Operation Prairie II was essentially a continuation of the just-concluded Operation Prairie in the same tactical area of operations (TAOR). 3rd Marine Division deputy commander BG Michael P. Ryan was given responsibility for the area, and he controlled 3 infantry battalions, 2 reconnaissance companies and artillery and other supporting units. Only 1 infantry battalion was available at any time for mobile operations, with the other two battalions occupied with defending the large Marines bases along Route 9.

== Operation ==
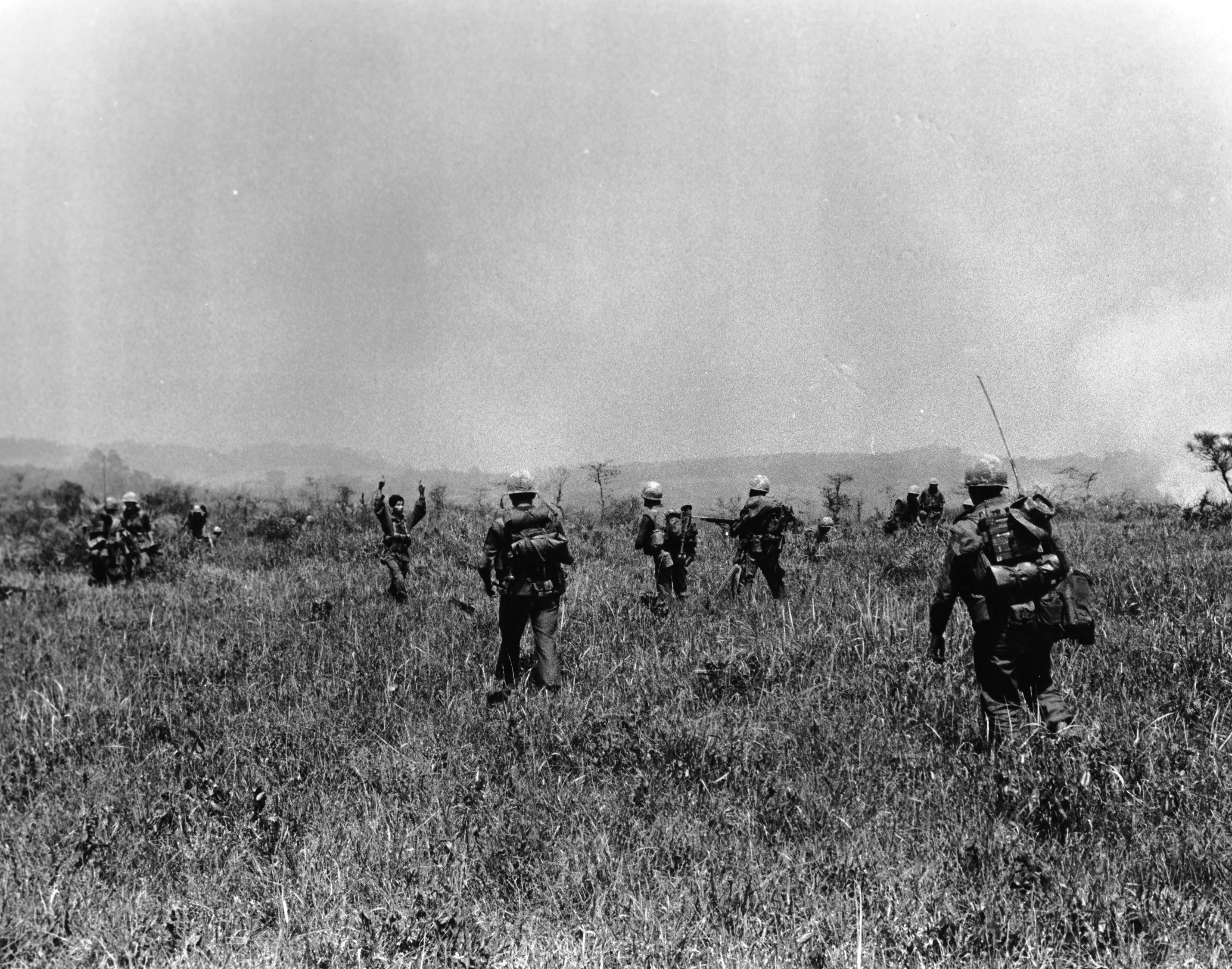
A PAVN soldier surrenders to Company A, 1/9 Marines, 3 March 1967

The first few weeks of the operation saw little PAVN activity, however PAVN infiltration across the DMZ increased during the Tết ceasefire from 8 to 12 February. On 25 February, Marine artillery carried out Operation Highrise, bombarding PAVN within and north of the DMZ. The PAVN responded on 27 February with an intensive bombardment of Con Thien and Firebase Gio Linh.

On the morning of 27 February a Marine reconnaissance patrol operation 5km northwest of Cam Lộ Combat Base attempted to ambush two PAVN soldiers, however the soldiers were the lead elements of a company from the 812th Regiment, 324B Division which quickly surrounded the Marines who then called for support. Company L, 3rd Battalion, 4th Marines patrolling with two M48 tanks north of Cam Lộ was sent to support the patrol, but were delayed by thick jungle and then were engaged by PAVN as they crossed a stream, following that engagement one of the tanks lost a track and Company L formed a defensive perimeter. Company G, 2nd Battalion, 3rd Marines was then deployed from Camp Carroll to assist the reconnaissance Marines, and they were finally able to link up with them at 23:40.

At 06:30 on 28 February the PAVN hit Company L, 3/4 Marines night defensive position with over 150 82mm mortar rounds followed by a ground assault hitting three sides of the perimeter. RPG-2 rounds hit both tanks, but they remained in operation and by 09:00 Company L had repulsed three assaults. Company F, 2/3 Marines was sent from Camp Carroll to reinforce Company L and joined up with them at 10:30. Company L had lost four Marines killed and 34 wounded in the morning's attacks. Company G and the reconnaissance patrol were then ordered into blocking positions on Hill 124 (16.834°N 106.949°E) and at 10:35 as they moved up the hill Company G was engaged on both sides by entrenched PAVN in a battle that lasted into the afternoon with Company G losing seven Marines killed. At 14:30 Company M, 3/4 Marines was landed on Hill 162 (16.846°N 106.943°E) north of Hill 124 and moved south to link up with Company G meeting no opposition. At 14:30 the 2/3 Marines command group and Company F moved from the Company L position towards Hill 124, immediately triggering a PAVN ambush and at 15:10 the 2/3 Marines commander Lt Col. Victor Ohanesian ordered a withdrawal. He was mortally wounded as he tried to evacuate a wounded Marine and the battalion operations officer Maj. Robert Sheridan, although wounded himself, took command of the column and organized its withdrawal back to the Company L position. Marine PFC James Anderson Jr. would later be posthumously awarded the Medal of Honor for his actions during this ambush. The PAVN then attacked the Marine perimeter but were repulsed by tank fire, however the PAVN kept up a steady bombardment of the position which prevented MEDEVAC helicopters from landing to evacuate the wounded.

Lt Col. Earl DeLong was given command of 2/3 Marines to replace the wounded Ohanesian, but was unable to land at the perimeter due to the intense fire and returned to Cam Lộ where he took command of Company F, 2nd Battalion, 9th Marines which marched to the 2/3 Marines perimeter, arriving at 03:40 on 1 March. At midday Company G 2/3 Marines and Company M, 3/4 Marines arrived at the 2/3 Marines position, and they swept the surrounding area, but the PAVN had withdrawn. Later that day 1st Battalion, 9th Marines was landed at Hill 162 and began sweeping north, while the 3rd Battalion, 3rd Marines moved northwest from Cam Lộ in an attempt to squeeze any PAVN between them and the 1/9 Marines.

On 3 March, aerial reconnaissance spotted three large groups of PAVN moving towards the DMZ carrying bodies. Air and artillery strikes were called in and 1/9 Marines searched the area after the bombardment, claiming to have found more than 200 PAVN dead.

On 7 March, the PAVN hit Camp Carroll with over 400 mortar rounds, causing little damage.

The Marines saw little action for the rest of the operation, sweeps uncovered more PAVN. In mid-March, an Army of the Republic of Vietnam Airborne unit engaged a PAVN unit southeast of Con Thien, killing over 250 PAVN.

== Aftermath ==
Operation Prairie II concluded on 18 March, the Marines had lost 93 killed, 483 wounded and claiming 694 PAVN killed and 20 captured. 137 individual weapons were recovered during the campaign. The operation proceeded to Operation Prairie III.
