= Operation Prairie =

Part of the Vietnam War (1966)

- Part of the Vietnam War
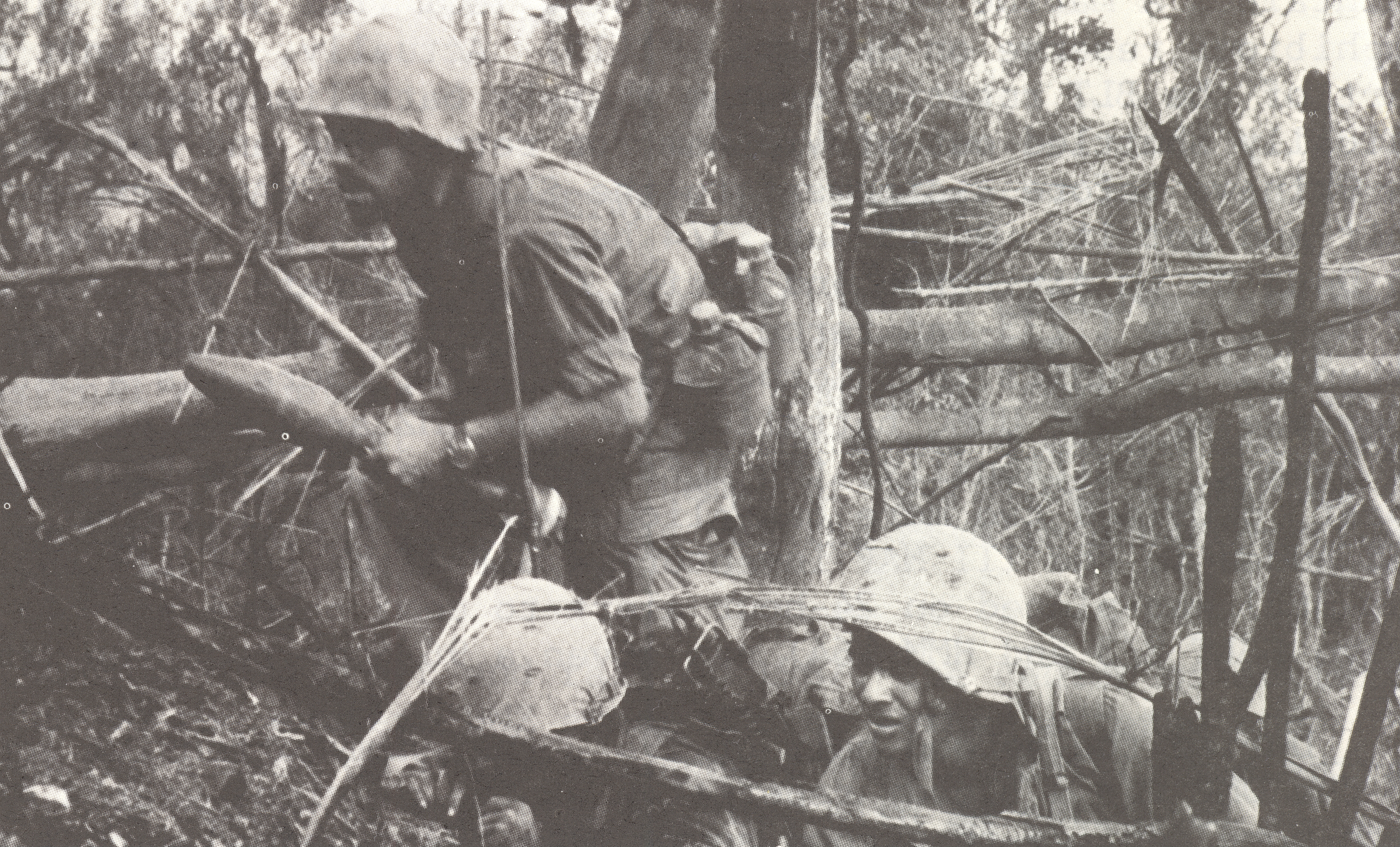
- U.S. Marines from 3rd Battalion, 4th Marines during Operation Prairie.
Date	3 August 1966 – 31 January 1967
Location	Vietnamese Demilitarized Zone
Result	See Aftermath

Belligerents
United States	North Vietnam

Commanders and leaders
LG Lew Walt; MG Wood B. Kyle; BG Lowell English; Col. Alexander D. Cereghino; Lt Col. Arnold E. Bench; Lt Col. William J. Masterpool	

Units involved
3rd Marine Division	324B Division

Casualties and losses
226 killed At least 5 helicopters shot down	1,329 killed 1,713 estimated killed 27 captured 248 weapons recovered

Operation Prairie was a U.S. military operation in Quảng Trị Province, South Vietnam that sought to eliminate People's Army of Vietnam (PAVN) forces south of the Demilitarized Zone (DMZ). Over the course of late 1965 and early 1966 the Viet Cong (VC) and the PAVN intensified their military threat along the DMZ. The tactical goal of these incursions was to draw United States military forces away from cities and towns. Operation Hastings, a series of actions in defense of the DMZ, lasted from 15 July to 3 August 1966. It was considered a strategic success. Operation Prairie was conceived as a larger, longer mission covering the same areas along the DMZ.

It commenced on 3 August 1966 and lasted for six months. The majority of the activities were conducted by the 3rd Marine Division in the Con Thien and Gio Linh regions with the main objective of stopping the PAVN 324B Division from crossing the DMZ and invading Quang Tri Province.

Various units engaged in fiercely fought actions during the operation, usually supported by a mixture of artillery, air and helicopter gunship support, sometimes including B-52 strategic bombers. By November the 324B Division had been withdrawn after heavy losses. It was replaced by other PAVN units, but these remained inactive.

The operation was considered highly successful by the Americans. They had lost 226 Marines killed against estimated PAVN of over 1,700 dead or captured and suppressed PAVN activity. However, the PAVN strategy had tied down large numbers of US troops in the area south of the DMZ, leaving population centers under-protected.

== Background ==
Over the course of late 1965 and early 1966 the Viet Cong (VC) and PAVN intensified their military threat along the DMZ. The tactical goal of these incursions was to draw United States military forces away from cities and towns; a similar strategy would be employed during the final months of 1967 in order to maximize the impact of the upcoming Tet Offensive. In response, the Marines elected to construct and reinforce a string of firebases south of the DMZ at Con Thien, Gio Linh, Camp Carroll, and Dong Ha. To support the defense of the DMZ area, Marines were often relocated from the southern regions of I Corps.

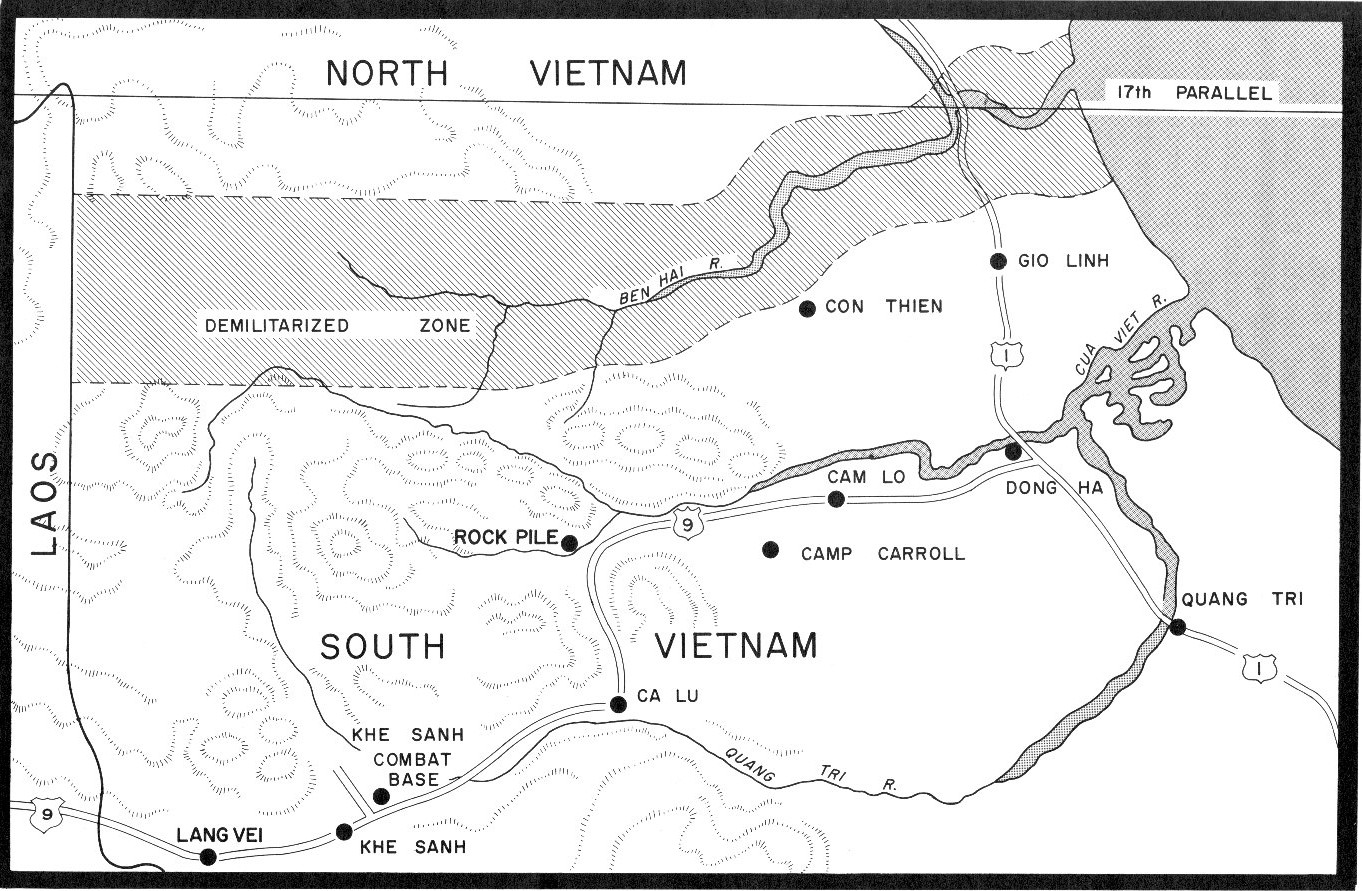
Map of the demilitarized zone and northern Quang Tri Province during the Vietnam War

The original actions in defense of the DMZ, officially designated as Operation Hastings, began on 15 July 1966. Operation Hastings was a strategic success for American and Army of the Republic of Vietnam (ARVN) troops as the estimated enemy casualties reached upwards of 800 enemy soldiers. The operation, however, was only scheduled to last slightly longer than three weeks, reaching its conclusion on 3 August 1966.

== Objectives ==
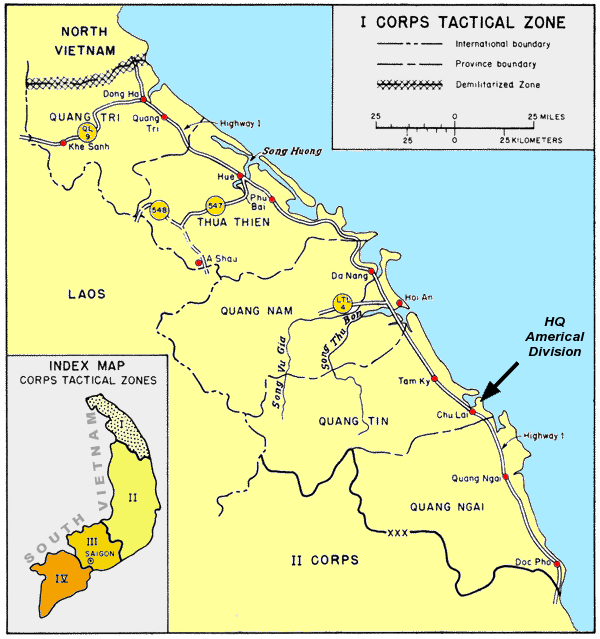
Map of the I Corps Tactical Zone

Due to the initial, albeit brief, success of Operation Hastings the United States elected to essentially renew the mission and rename it Operation Prairie. Operation Prairie would cover the same areas along the DMZ that Operation Hastings had, as well as having the same mission. The formal objective of Prairie was to search the areas south of DMZ for PAVN troops and eliminate them. Operation Prairie also aimed to determine the extent of PAVN and VC infiltration of northern I Corps.

A majority of the activities would be conducted by the 3rd Marine Division in the Con Thien and Gio Linh regions beginning in early August 1966 with the main objective of tracking and stopping the PAVN 324B Division from crossing the demilitarized zone and invading Quang Tri Province. The preliminary plan centered on the insertion of four to five man "stingray" teams along the suspected enemy avenues of approach. If these reconnaissance teams encountered the enemy they would call for artillery support from Cam Lộ and helicopter or other aircraft support from Da Nang or Chu Lai. In the event that ground reinforcements were needed the infantry companies located at Cam Lộ and Dong Ha would provide them.

== Operations ==
Operation Prairie, following closely on the heels of Operation Hastings, was launched on 3 August 1966 seeking to interdict any communist infiltration. The first significant encounter occurred on 6 August 1966, just after the UH-1E insertion of a five-man team codenamed Groucho Marx 4 km north of the Rockpile and 1 km southeast of Núi Cây Tre Ridge. Shortly after landing the team could smell smoke from a suspected enemy camp and soon reported PAVN movement along trails near their position. Team Groucho Marx called for an artillery bombardment from Cam Lo on the location on two occasions over the next days.

On the morning of 8 August 1966, the team spotted approximately 15 enemy troops moving in a skirmish line in search of the American patrol. Reinforcements from Company E 2nd Battalion, 4th Marines arrived in support via CH-46 helicopters, as well as a pair of gunships. However the enemy had disappeared, so the Marines called for helicopter extraction. Eight UH-34 helicopters from HMM-161 arrived at the improvised landing zone without incident, but upon takeoff PAVN troops opened fire from a ridgeline to the north. In total five of the UH-34s were able to land, but only 20 of the 45 Marines were evacuated as the other helicopters abandoned the withdrawal due to the heavy fire. Now under the command of Captain Howard V. Lee, the Marines that remained set up a defensive perimeter and fought off several large attacks from what is estimated to have been a company of enemy soldiers.

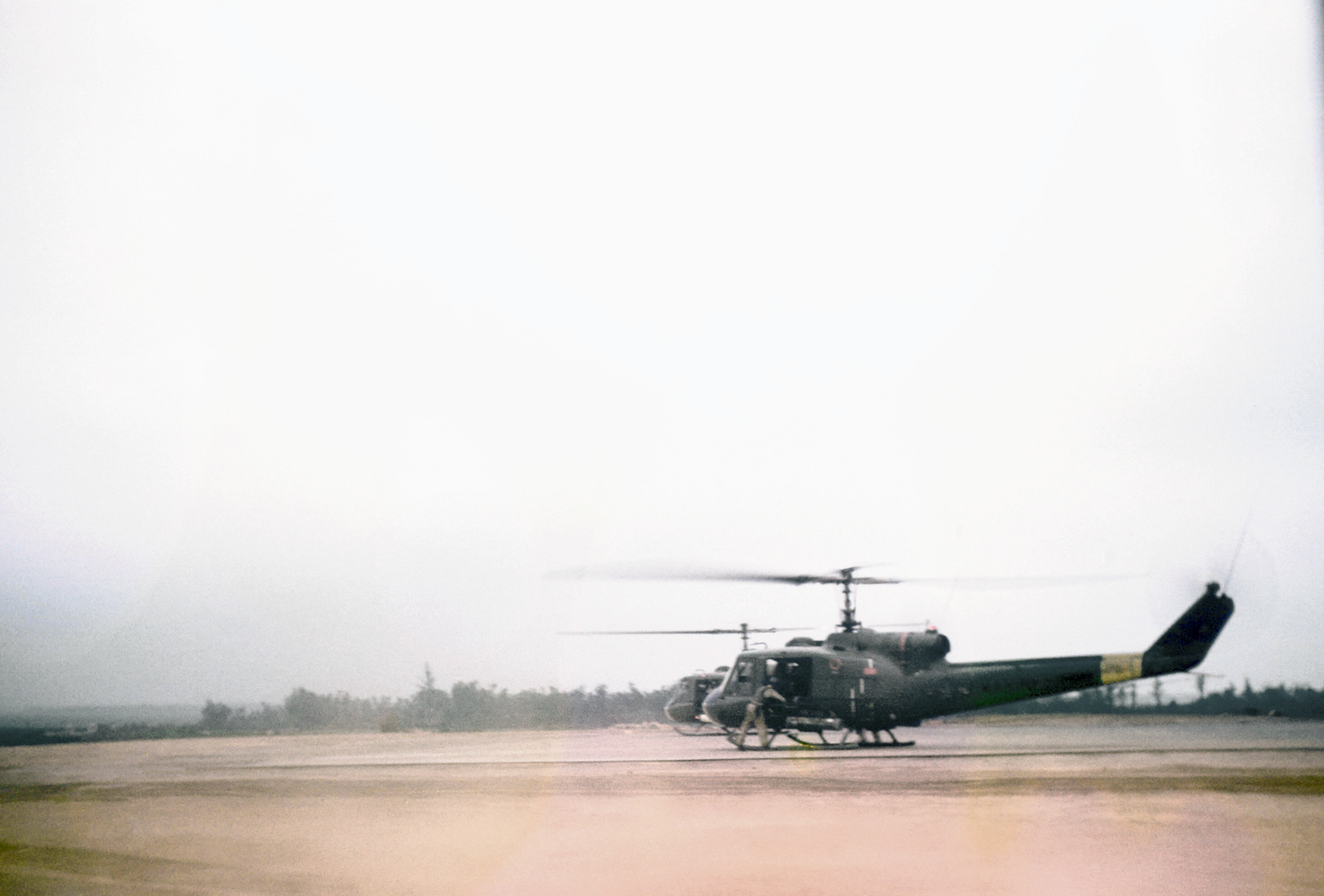
A UH-1E Huey gunship preparing for take off at Đông Hà Combat Base.

Over the course of the next few hours Major Vincil W. Hazelbaker landed his UH-1E helicopter under withering enemy fire to resupply the Marines. Hazelbaker then departed, reloaded his helicopter at Dong Ha Airfield and returned. After several unsuccessful attempts Hazelbaker finally safely landed and resupplied the troops a second time. However, during the unloading of ammunition an enemy rocket impacted the rotor mast, crippling the aircraft. Hazelbaker then assumed command, as Lee had been injured by a fragmentation grenade, and directed a napalm strike on the enemy position at dawn on 9 August 1966. Reinforcements finally arrived later that morning, secured the area, and aided in the evacuation of the remaining Marines in the afternoon. In total the Marines suffered 32 casualties, with five men killed, while they inflicted at least 37 enemy killed-in-action (KIA). A support team later noted other bloodstains and drag marks indicating a much larger number of casualties. For their actions during the two-day fight, Lee earned the Medal of Honor and Hazelbaker the Navy Cross.

Convinced that the PAVN had returned in strength across the DMZ, on 14 August the 4th Marines commander Colonel Cereghino moved the 1st Battalion, 4th Marines up from Phu Bai Combat Base to relieve the 2/4 Marines from their defensive duties to conduct a reconnaissance in force along Route 9 from Cam Lo to the Rockpile and the area north.

On the morning 17 August 3 companies from 2/4 Marines left Cam Lo and moved west along Route 9. At midday marine aircraft bombed Hill 252 which overhung Route 9 near the Khe Gio bridge. The Marines moved forward but came under fire from a PAVN bunker dug into Hill 252. The Marines called in airstrikes and two M-48 tanks from Company C, 3rd Tank Battalion at Cam Lộ arrived to support the Marines. Total casualties were two Marines and an estimated 20 PAVN killed.

On the morning of 18 August the Marines renewed their attack taking Hill 252 and killing a further three PAVN. The 2/4 Marines continued west and established night defensive positions north of the Rockpile. The 2/4 Marines established a command post 2 km northeast of the Rockpile and the companies then searched to the north, northwest and northeast. On 19 August Company E located two concrete bunkers and was moving to destroy them when they were caught in a machine gun crossfire. The Marines called in air, artillery and gunship support and overran the PAVN positions killing 30 PAVN for the loss of two Marines killed. A B-52 strike was called in behind the PAVN position and for the next two days the Marines searched the area occasionally skirmishing with the PAVN or being hit by mortar fire.

=== The Razorback ===
On 21 August a PAVN machine gun located on a ridge named the Razorback (16.786°N 106.842°E) 1 km northwest of the Rockpile began firing on helicopters supplying the Marine observation post on the top of the Rockpile. On 23 August Lieutenant Colonel Bench ordered Company E to destroy the machine gun. Company E commander Captain Edward Besch arrived in the area at midday and established a command post and then led three squads to explore the rock face of the ridge. At 14:00 they found a bowl shaped area honeycombed with large caves that showed signed of recent PAVN occupation. After searching the area, one squad was detached to search for the machine gun further down the ridge and then returned to the command post. Besch continued his search with two squads until 16:30. They were preparing to leave when they heard voices in one of the caves. Hoping to capture prisoners they approached the cave mouth where they were fired on and then squads of PAVN soldiers emerged from six caves scattering the Marines with fire.

The two squads engaged in close combat with the PAVN and desperately radioed for assistance. Bench formed a composite company with platoons from Companies F and G and his headquarters company and they were flown into the Company E command post while fighters and VMO-2 gunships provided air support. The platoon from Company F was sent forward to the Razorback. The other platoons secured the command post against PAVN forces which were attempting to outflank them. With flareship support and AC-47 fire, the Company F platoon reached the edge of the bowl at 00:30 finding the PAVN controlled the high ground from their caves while the Company E troops were scattered below. An attempt to reach the trapped Marines failed. At 06:00 the PAVN emerged from their caves for a final attack on the Company E position and the Company F platoon counterattacked breaking the PAVN assault. At dawn Company G was deployed to the Company E command post and tanks were moved up from Cam Lộ. The tank guns, together with recoilless rifle fire, blasted the PAVN positions, breaking through to Companies E and F by mid-morning. Total Marines casualties were 21 dead, 11 from Company E, while PAVN losses were estimated at 120–170 killed.

A PAVN prisoner captured on the Razorback was identified as coming from the 803rd Regiment, 324B Division. He revealed that his unit's mission was to neutralize the Rockpile and then attack Cam Lộ. At 03:00 on 26 August listening posts of Company A 1st Battalion, 4th Marines outside the perimeter at Cam Lộ reported movement and were then withdrawn into the perimeter. The commander decided to let the PAVN come through the wire before being exposed by flares and then hit by defensive fire. However, some PAVN soldiers penetrated the perimeter before the flares were fired, attacking the positions where the 3rd Battalion, 12th Marines artillery had been located only the previous day. Satchel charges destroyed Marine positions and a tank retriever. Marine losses in the attack were nine killed.

On 29 August 2/4 Marines returned to Dong Ha while the 1/4 Marines conducted a reconnaissance in force along Route 9 meeting no resistance. Marine losses in August in Operation Prairie were 37 dead while PAVN losses exceeded 200 dead.

=== Operations around Con Thien ===
U.S. intelligence indicated that a PAVN battalion was moving into the area between Con Thien and the DMZ and 1/4 Marines were ordered to conduct a reconnaissance in force of the area. On 7 September Company H supported by tanks from Company C, 3rd Tank Battalion moved from Cam Lộ while the rest of the battalion was landed by helicopter at Con Thien. On the morning of 8 September Company G engaged a PAVN platoon in a three-hour firefight 1 km northeast of Con Thien, losing five Marines killed. On 9 September Companies E and F supported by tanks engaged an entrenched PAVN company 3 km south of the DMZ. The tanks were used to fire point blank into the PAVN bunkers. 20 PAVN soldiers were killed for the loss of three Marines. Sweeps continued until 13 September, meeting scattered resistance, and 1/4 Marines returned to Cam Lộ.

On 15 September 1966, the Marines Special Landing Force of 1st Battalion, 26th Marine Regiment launched Operation Deckhouse IV in the eastern Prairie area of operations, landing north of the Cửa Việt River and 2 km south of the DMZ. By the end of the operation on 25 September, the 1/26 Marines had killed over 200 PAVN for the loss of 36 Marines killed.

=== Mutter's Ridge ===
U.S. intelligence indicated that the 324B Division was continuing to build up its infiltration routes north of the Rockpile and through the Núi Cây Tre Ridge. On 8 September 1/4 Marines relieved 2nd Battalion, 7th Marines at the Rockpile. On 15 September Companies B and D began patrolling north towards the Núi Cây Tre Ridge. At midday on 16 September the two companies were moving in column when they walked into a PAVN ambush. The PAVN forces let the first two platoons pass before springing the ambush. The two companies were able to establish a defensive perimeter and engage the PAVN. Air and artillery support was called in and a two and a half day battle ensued before the arrival of 2/7 Marines marching from Cam Lộ forced the PAVN to disengage. PAVN losses were 170 killed while Marine losses were nine killed.

1/4 Marines returned to the Rockpile on 19 September while 2/7 Marines searched south of the Núi Cây Tre for two days, clashing frequently with the PAVN before being ordered to return to the Rockpile. The PAVN were obviously well-entrenched on the Núi Cây Tre and had reoccupied the Razorback from where they were mortaring the Rockpile. On 22 September Cereghino ordered Companies F and G to attack the PAVN on the Razorback. On 24 September Company G killed five PAVN on the Razorback but were soon pinned down by enemy fire. Company F was sent to assist, but was similarly pinned down. The Marines called in air and artillery support to allow the companies to move again. A platoon from Company F then located a trail leading into an unoccupied PAVN base camp and took positions in the PAVN bunkers while waiting for the soldiers to return from their attack on Company G, killing 58 PAVN troops. Company F lost three Marines killed while Company G lost ten killed. On 30 September 2nd Battalion, 9th Marines replaced 2/7 Marines which returned to Chu Lai.

On the morning of 22 September, after bombarding a false target area, CH-46s began landing troops from the 3rd Battalion, 4th Marines 4.5 km east of the Núi Cây Tre. By nightfall they had moved 1.5 km northwest and dug in for the night. The Marines advanced slowly through extremely dense jungle to begin their assault on the ridge, cutting narrow paths through foliage 2 m tall under a canopy of bamboo and tall trees. As Company L advanced on Hill 400 they began to see large numbers of destroyed PAVN positions and dead.

By the night of 26 September Companies K and L were dug in on Hill 400. At 07:30 on 27 September, as Company K moved towards its next objective 1 km southwest it was ambushed by the PAVN losing seven dead and one missing. 3/4 Marines commander Lieutenant Colonel William J. Masterpool ordered the battalion to move up to join Company K and establish a defensive perimeter. On the morning of 28 September, as Company K resumed its advance, it was stopped by fire from PAVN bunkers and withdrew to allow artillery fire to hit them. The PAVN then attacked Company K, and the other companies moved to reinforce it, killing over 50 for the loss of seven Marines, including the Marine missing the previous day. By the end of the day, 3/4 Marines controlled Hill 400.

On 2 October, Company M secured a hill 500 m east of Hill 400, and the rest of the battalion moved up to establish positions for an attack on Hill 484. The following day Company I found 25 abandoned PAVN bunkers on the hill. On the morning of 4 October, Company M led the assault on Hill 484 but was soon pinned down by PAVN bunkers. Attempts at frontal and flanking assaults failed due to the steep terrain and heavy fire, and the Marines withdrew to allow air and artillery strikes. At 10:00 on 5 October, Company M resumed the assault and by midday had secured the summit. The PAVN units continued resisting until 13:30, when they disengaged. The PAVN left 10 bodies and 16–20 weapons, while the Marines had lost three dead, caused by errant Marine tank gunfire that hit Hill 400. Among those killed was Company K commander Captain James J. Carroll; Camp Carroll would be named in his honour. Total losses in the fighting for Núi Cây Tre were 20 Marines and over 100 PAVN killed. Núi Cây Tre would be nicknamed Mutter's Ridge by the Marines after the 3/4 Marines' radio callsign.

Photojournalist Larry Burrows took a large number of photos during the battle for Núi Cây Tre, the most recognizable was taken on Hill 400, showing a wounded Marine guided by a Fleet Marine Force Hospital Corpsman attached to his unit as he reaches out to another seriously wounded Marine waiting to be medevaced.

=== Strengthening Quảng Trị Province ===
Concerned by the growing PAVN activity along the DMZ and that PAVN units could move past the Marines' positions at the Rockpile and Dong Ha, COMUSMACV General William Westmoreland pushed III MAF to station a Marine battalion at Khe Sanh. 3rd Marine Division deputy commander BG Lowell English strongly opposed the plan stating "When you're at Khe Sanh, you're not really anywhere. It's far away from everything. You could lose it and you really haven't lost a damn thing." However, following receipt of intelligence on 26 September that a PAVN force was located 14 km northeast of Khe Sanh, Walt ordered the 1st Battalion, 3rd Marines to move to Khe Sanh. They landed there by C-130 on 29 September. The Marines patrolled the perimeter of the base out to the limits of artillery cover but encountered no substantial PAVN forces, killing 15 PAVN troops.

III MAF also established Task Force Delta commanded by English based at Dong Ha and he assumed command from Cereghino on 1 October. 2nd Battalion, 5th Marines was flown to Dong Ha from Chu Lai giving Task Force Delta 6 infantry battalions and supporting arms. On 6 October Walt ordered the 3rd Marine Division to move from Danang to Quảng Trị Province and the new headquarters became operational at Phu Bai Combat Base on 10 October. The 1st Marine Division became responsible for the Danang area of operations. In late October Task Force Delta was deactivated but English retained control of the operation from Dong Ha. The 3rd Marines assumed operational control over the western Prairie area, while 4th Marines assumed control of the eastern area. The 2/5 Marines took over Con Thien from the ARVN and the 3rd Battalion, 7th Marines and 1/4 Marines operated near Dong Ha and Cam Lo.

During November U.S. intelligence learnt that the 324B Division had moved back north of the DMZ and while the 341st Division had apparently infiltrated the southern Prairie area they remained inactive. Faced with the reduced PAVN threat, by the end of the year III MAF had reduced its forces to just the 3rd Marines. Operation Prairie concluded on 31 January 1967 with a total of 226 Marines killed and 1,397 PAVN killed.

== Aftermath ==
Operation Prairie was considered a huge success by the American and South Vietnamese forces. However its primary triumphs were overshadowed in the months and years that followed. The allied forces accomplished exactly what had been outlined in Prairie's objectives: preventing enemy infiltration across the DMZ and Ben Hai River and determining the extent of their infiltration. Nevertheless, the PAVN units merely fled over the DMZ to North Vietnam in order to regroup, reequip, and then reenter South Vietnam later in 1967. One of the other purposes of Operation Prairie was to reduce the large investment of manpower that the U.S. forces had committed to protect the DMZ. Instead the PAVN strategy tied down a major portion of the Marine force in I Corps along the vast, barren tracts of land south of the DMZ, leaving population centers undermanned and under protected.

The Marines renewed the operation several times during the first half of 1967 beginning with Operation Prairie II, which spanned from 1 February to 18 March. Operation Prairie III began just two days after the conclusion of Prairie II on 20 March and lasted until 19 April 1967. Operation Prairie IV ran from 20 April to 17 May 1967 southeast of Con Thien.

== See also ==
- Operation Hastings
