= Đông Hà Combat Base =

Site information
- Type: Marines/Army

Location
- Coordinates: 16.813°N 107.087°E

Site history
- Built: 1966
- In use: 1966–1972
- Battles/wars: Vietnam War

Garrison information
- Occupants: 3rd Marine Division; ARVN 1st Division; ARVN 3rd Division; Naval Support Activity Detachment, Dong Ha

Airfield information
- IATA: none; ICAO: none

Summary
- Elevation AMSL: 82 ft (25 m)
- Interactive map of Airfield information

Runways
Direction	Length		Surface
Direction	ft	m	Surface
	3,700	1,128	PSP

Đông Hà Combat Base (also known as Camp Spillman, Camp Red Devil or simply Đông Hà) is a former U.S. Marine Corps and U.S. Army base northwest of Quảng Trị in central Vietnam. The base was first used by the 4th Marines in late April 1966. In mid-July Đông Hà was used by the Marines as a helicopter base and logistics area. Numerous US marine and army units rotated through the base, and several artillery units were based there.

During 1968 units of the People's Army of Vietnam (PAVN) made repeated attacks on the base, on one occasion destroying its ammunition dump. During these attacks, and in other actions in the general area the PAVN suffered heavy casualties.

By January 1972 the Army of the Republic of Vietnam (ARVN) 3rd Division had assumed responsibility for the defense of Đông Hà and the area north of Highway 9. During April 1972 the PAVN made repeated assaults on Dong Ha and it fell on the 28th.

== History ==
=== 1966–67 ===
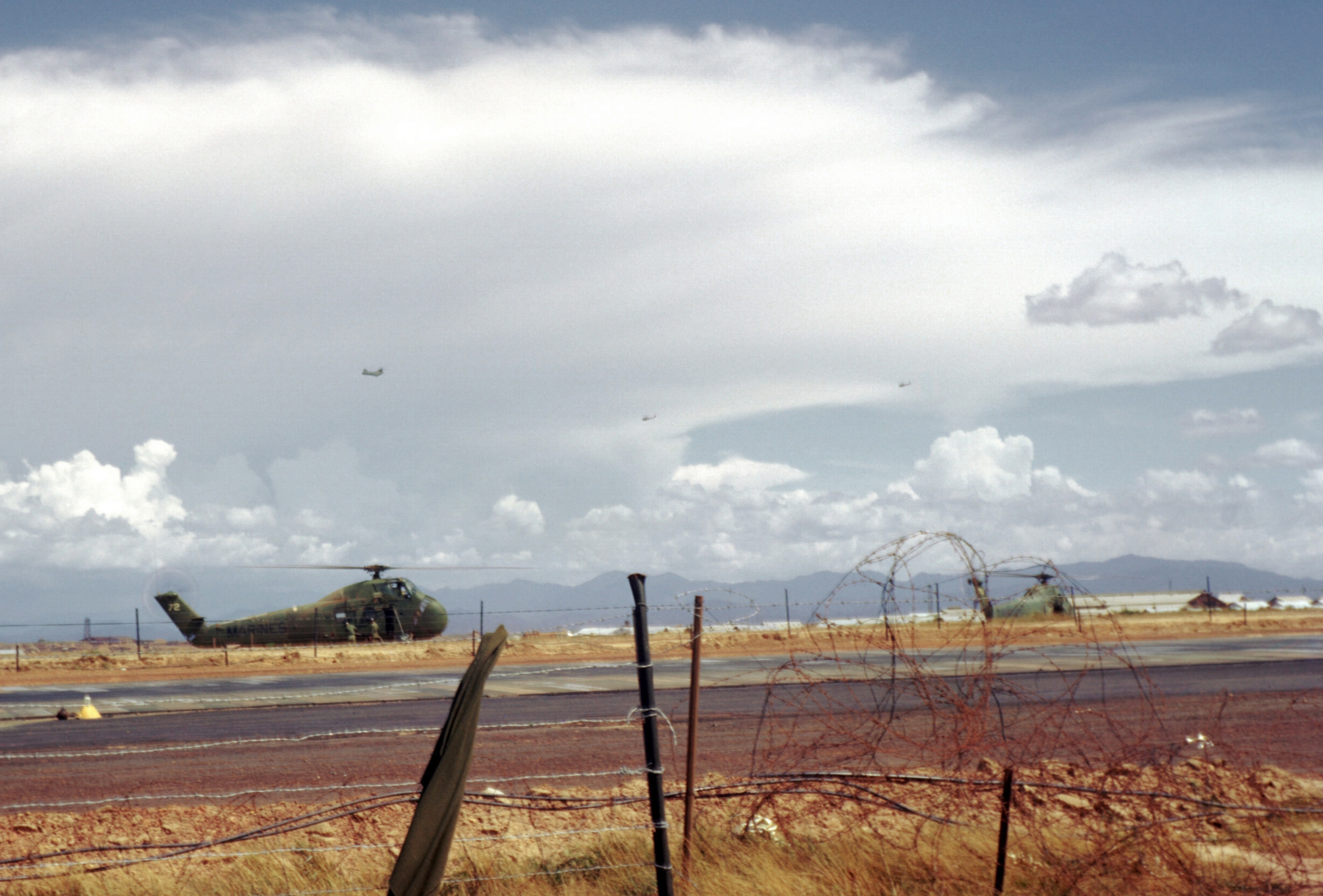
Marine helicopters at Đông Hà in 1967

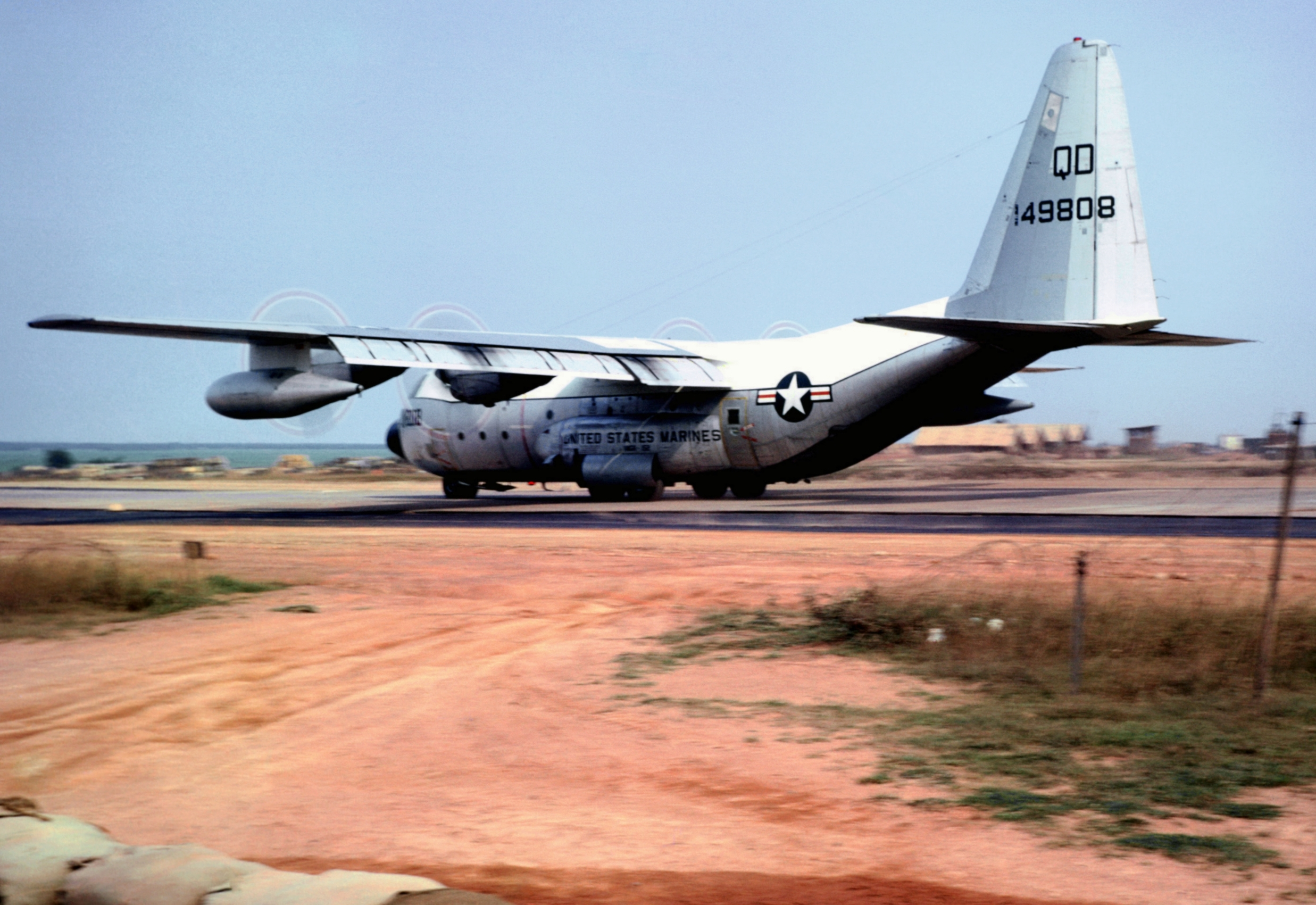
VMGR-152 KC-130 at Đông Hà in 1967

The base was in Đông Hà 13 km northwest of Quảng Trị on Highway 9 near the intersection with Highway 1 and only approximately 10 km south of the Vietnamese Demilitarized Zone (DMZ).

The base was first used by the 3rd Battalion, 4th Marines in late April 1966. 2nd Battalion, 4th Marines was deployed by air to the base on 29 May in Operation Reno to support Army of the Republic of Vietnam (ARVN) forces in sweeps around Đông Hà. During this period the U.S. Air Force (USAF) installed a Combat Skyspot radar system at the airfield, 6 USAF radar technicians were killed in an ambush on 5 June 6 km south of the base. The Marines departed Đông Hà on 8 June.

On 22 June the Marines' "Task Force Charlie" comprising two Force Reconnaissance Companies, Companies from 2nd Battalion 1st Marines and 3/4 Marines and Battery H 3rd Battalion, 12th Marines deployed to Đông Hà and Cam Lộ.

In mid-July Đông Hà was used by the Marines as a helicopter base and logistics area in support of Operation Hastings and Marine Aircraft Group 16 (MAG-16) established a forward base here at this time. Following the completion of Operation Hastings on 3 August, the Marines kept a force at Đông Hà comprising 2/4 Marines, elements of the 3rd Engineer Battalion, Marine logistics troops, MAG-16 and the Army's 220th Assault Helicopter Company and these forces were immediately used to launch Operation Prairie.

On 10 October the 3rd Marine Division established a forward headquarters at Đông Hà to counter an expected People's Army of Vietnam (PAVN) attack through the DMZ. Đông Hà became an increasingly important forward base supporting USMC operations along the DMZ and its airfield was lengthened to accommodate Lockheed C-130 Hercules transports. In addition a LCU/YFU offloading facility operated by the Naval Support Activity Detachment, Dong Ha was developed to receive supplies ferried from the Cửa Việt Base.

On 12 April 1967 the 9th Marines moved their headquarters to Đông Hà.

On the night of 27/8 April the base was hit by more than 50 PAVN 140mm rockets. On the early morning of 18 May more than 150 140mm rockets hit the base killing 11 Marines and wounding 91.

In mid-May BLT 3/4 Marines was landed by air at Đông Hà to participate in Operation Hickory.

Đông Hà was intended to form a supporting base for the McNamara Line and supported USMC forces engaged at Con Thien.

On 26 August the base was hit by 150 PAVN artillery and rockets in 3 separate attacks destroying 2 helicopters and damaging 24 others. On 3 September PAVN rockets hit the ammunition dump and fuel storage facility causing a huge explosion that damaged 17 helicopters of HMM-361 and wounded 77 Marines.

Marine aviation units based at Đông Hà during this period included:

- Marine Aircraft Group 16 Forward:
  - HMM-163 detachments (December 1966 – January 1967)
  - HMM-164 detachments (July 1966 – March 1967, July–November 1967)
  - HMM-263 detachments (August 1966 – April 1967, August–October 1967)
  - HMM-265 detachments (April–June 1967)
  - HMM-361 detachments (June–November 1967)
  - HMM-363 detachments (April–June 1967, August–November 1967)
  - VMO-2 detachments (July 1966 – November 1967)
- Marine Air Support Squadron 2 - operated a Direct Air Support Center (DASC) and multiple Air Support Radar Teams in support of the 3d Marine Division.

The 3 September attack convinced the Marines that Đông Hà was too vulnerable to PAVN artillery and rocket attack to continue to be used as a helicopter facility and the Marines moved their units back to Phu Bai and Marble Mountain while the logistics base was moved to the new Quảng Trị Combat Base.

Army units based at Đông Hà during this period included:

- Battery F, 26th Artillery
- Battery G, 29th Artillery
- 1st Battalion, 44th Artillery (1966–70)
- Battery G, 65th Artillery (1966–70)
- 2nd Battalion, 94th Artillery (October 1966 – March 1968)

=== 1968 ===
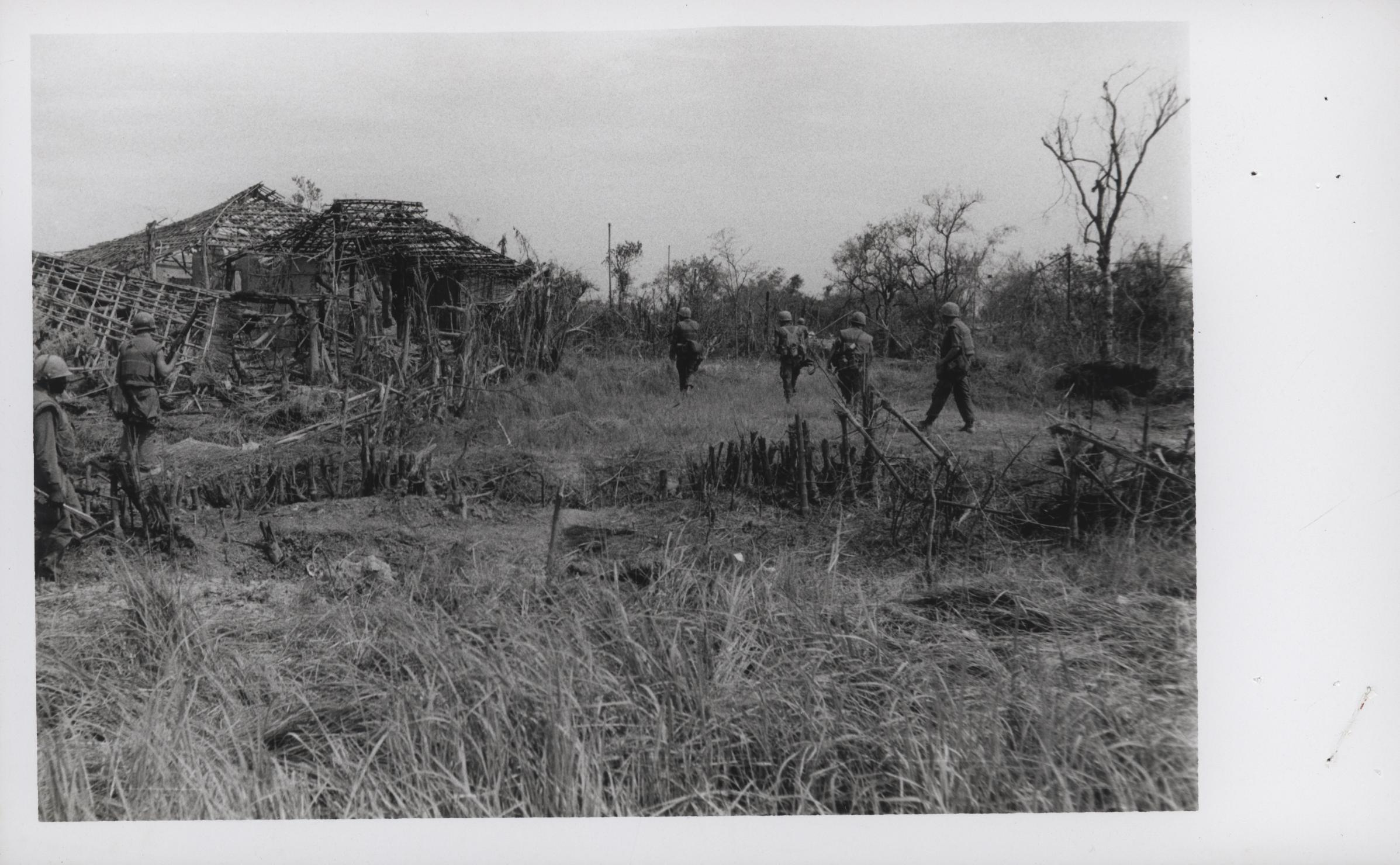
2/4 Marines search Dai Do village, May 1968

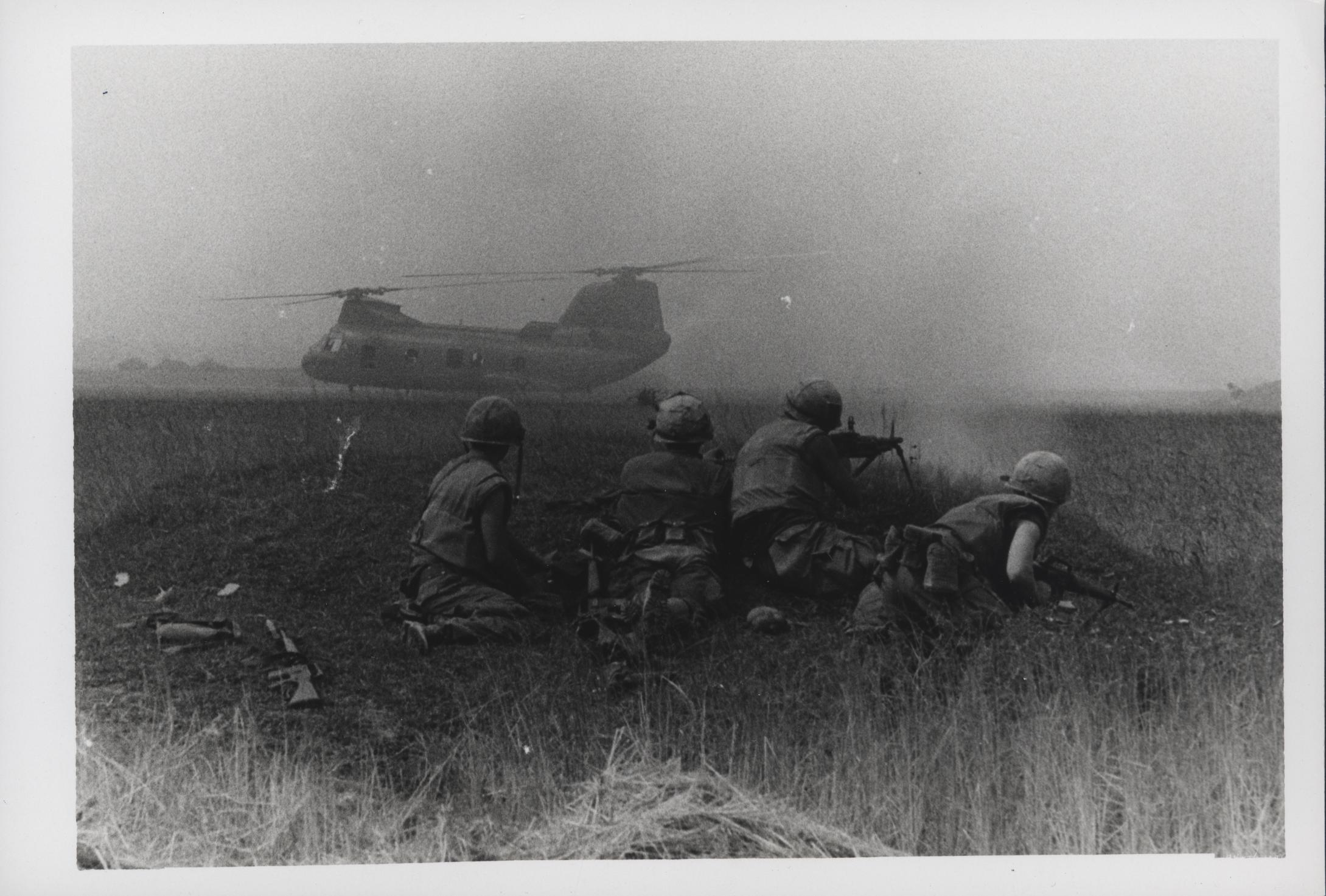
Marines provide machine gun cover for a CH-46A Sea Knight near Đông Hà, 5 May 1968

On 15 January 3 Marine Division moved its headquarters from Phu Bai to Đông Hà.

On 26 February the base hit by more than 400 PAVN artillery and mortar rounds resulting in 1 Marine killed and several wounded, two Army observation aircraft were destroyed as well as ammunition and diesel storage facilities.

On 29 April the PAVN 320th Division attacked An Binh, north of Đông Hà, this drew two Battalions of the ARVN 2nd Regiment into a running battle and the 1st Battalion 9th Marines was sent into support the ARVN resulting in a 7-hour long battle that left 11 Marines, 17 ARVN and over 150 PAVN dead. The following day the 3rd Battalion 9th Marines arrived to support the Marine/ARVN force and was ambushed north of Cam Vu, 20 Marines and 41 NVA were killed. Also on 30 April, a PAVN unit opened fire on a US Navy Clearwater patrol from entrenched positions near Dai Do, 2.5 km northeast of Đông Hà. It was later discovered that four PAVN Battalions including the 48th and 56th from the 320th had established themselves at Dai Do. The Battle of Dai Do lasted until 3 May and resulted in 81 Marines and over 600 PAVN killed. The PAVN engaged US and ARVN forces elsewhere around Đông Hà from 4–6 May, on the evening of 6 May the 2nd Brigade 1st Cavalry Division was deployed into Tru Kinh and on 9 May was ambushed by a PAVN force resulting in 16 U.S. dead for the loss of 80 PAVN. On 10 May a night attack north of Nhi Ha was broken up by air, artillery and naval support, 159 PAVN were killed. After this the 320th had broken into small groups and was moving back towards the DMZ, from 9–17 May the 2nd Brigade reported killing 349 PAVN for the loss of 28 killed.

While it seemed that the 320th had abandoned their attempts to take Đông Hà this was just a temporary lull. On 22 May a unit from the 320th ran into a Company from 3rd Battalion 3rd Marines between Con Thien and Gio Linh and was caught in the open by Marine artillery and air support. East of Con Thien the 1st Battalion 4th Marines encountered another PAVN unit setting off a two-day battle as the PAVN tried to escape back through the DMZ resulting in 23 Marines and 225 PAVN killed. On 25 May in actions at Dai Do and Nhi Ha 350 PAVN were killed. In two actions at Tru Kinh on 26 May over 56 PAVN were killed for the loss of 10 Marines, while the ARVN killed 110 PAVN north of Thuong Nghia. On 27 April the Marines killed 28 PAVN and by 30 May the 320th was attempting to escape through the Marine and ARVN cordon. Total PAVN losses in the second Battle of Đông Hà were over 1000 killed.

On 14 May PAVN artillery destroyed 150 tons of munitions in the base's ammunition dump. On 20 June the base's ammunition dump was destroyed by PAVN artillery fire closing the entire logistics facility for six days. In August another artillery attack killed two Marines and wounded three others and destroyed six vehicles. On 30 October 48 artillery rounds hit the base killing one Marine.

Army units based at Đông Hà in this period included:

- 1st Battalion, 11th Infantry (November 1968)

=== 1969–1971 ===
In September 1969 as part of Operation Keystone Cardinal the 3rd Marine Division began its withdrawal from Vietnam and by early October the Marines had handed over control of their tactical area of operations (including the Đông Hà base) to the 1st Brigade, 5th Infantry Division and the ARVN 1st Division.

In 1970 the Marines 5th 175mm Gun Battery kept its command post at Đông Hà under the operational control of the 108th Artillery Group with its 175mm guns at Camp Carroll and 8in guns at FSB A-2. A small number of Marines remained at Đông Hà as part of the ANGLICO unit supporting the ARVN 1st Division.

Units based at Đông Hà in this period included:

- 3rd Battalion, 1st Infantry (April 1971)
- 4th Battalion, 3rd Infantry (April 1971)
- 6th Battalion, 33rd Artillery (1969 – February 1970)
- 2nd Battalion, 94th Artillery (1970–71)

In early 1971 the airfield was used to support Operation Lam Son 719. A Ground-controlled approach system, temporary airfield lighting and a TACAN were installed to permit all-weather, 24 hour operations.

=== 1972 ===
By January 1972 the ARVN 3rd Division had assumed responsibility for the defense of Đông Hà and the area north of Highway 9. At the start of the Easter Offensive on 30 March 1972 the 25th Marine Brigade was deployed to Đông Hà to support the 3rd Division. By 1 April the PAVN had broken through the ARVN defensive positions along the DMZ and north of the Cam Lo River and fragmented ARVN units and terrified civilians began withdrawing to Đông Hà. By 11:00 on 2 April the ARVN 20th Tank Battalion moved forward to Đông Hà to support the 3rd Marine Battalion and 25th Marine Brigade in and around the town and defend the crucial road and rail bridges across the Cua Viet River. Marine ANGLICO units called in naval gunfire to hit PAVN forces near the bridges on the north bank of the river and destroyed 4 PT-76 amphibious tanks east of Đông Hà. More tanks were hit by a Republic of Vietnam Air Force A-1 Skyraider before it was shot down. At midday PAVN tanks attempted to force the road bridge but 6 tanks were destroyed by fire from the ARVN 20th Tank's M48s. At approximately 1 pm Captain John Ripley, an adviser to the Vietnamese Marines, swung under the road bridge and spent 3 hours installing demolition charges to destroy the bridge. The bridge was blown up at 16:30 and the damaged railway bridge was destroyed around the same time temporarily halting the PAVN advance. Naval gunfire and a Boeing B-52 Stratofortress strike were soon directed at PAVN forces gathered on the northern bank. At 18:00 a USAF Douglas EB-66 Destroyer was shot down west of Đông Hà and a no fire zone was imposed around the area allowing the PAVN to capture the Cam Lo Bridge intact.

Over the next two weeks PAVN forces kept up a barrage of artillery, mortar and small arms fire on the ARVN positions and infiltrated small units across the river in boats. On 7 April the Marines withdrew from Đông Hà leaving the defense to the 1st ARVN Armored Brigade, 20th Tank Battalion, the 4th and 5th Ranger Groups and the 57th Regiment.

On 18 April the PAVN 308th Division attacking from the southwest attempted to outflank Đông Hà but were repulsed.

On 28 April the commander of the 20th Tank Battalion withdrew from Đông Hà to deal with a PAVN force threatening the Ái Tử Combat Base, seeing the tanks leaving the soldiers of the 57th Regiment panicked and abandoned their positions leading to the collapse of the ARVN defensive line.

In late October the ARVN began attacks north of Quảng Trị to try to regain positions along the south bank of the Cua Viet River. The attacks were met with a stiff PAVN response and were stopped at the Thạch Hãn River. A further attack from the coast by the Vietnamese Marines in November made limited gains. As the ongoing peace negotiations would soon lead to a ceasefire, the South Vietnamese Joint General Staff sought the most advantageous battlefield positions possible and so ordered a further effort to regain the south bank of the Cua Viet River. In mid-January 1973 an attack by the Marines succeeded in recapturing the Cua Viet Base but was stopped some 5 km east of Đông Hà. On 27 January in accordance with the provisions of the Paris Peace Accords a ceasefire in place took effect across South Vietnam.

== Current use ==
The base has been turned over to housing and shops and a large ceremonial square, Fidel Park (Công viên Fidel).
