= Mitchell W. Stout =

United States Army soldier and Medal of Honor recipient

Mitchell William Stout
- Army Medal of Honor
- Born: February 24, 1950; Knoxville, Tennessee, U.S.
- Died: March 12, 1970 (aged 20); Firebase Khe Gio, Quang Tri Province, South Vietnam
- Burial place: Virtue Cemetery, Farragut, Tennessee
- Military career
- Allegiance: United States of America
- Branch: United States Army
- Service years: 1967–1970
- Rank: Sergeant
- Unit: 44th Artillery Regiment
- Conflicts: Vietnam War †
- Awards: Medal of Honor; Bronze Star; Purple Heart

Mitchell William Stout (February 24, 1950 – March 12, 1970) was a United States Army soldier and a recipient of the United States military's highest decoration—the Medal of Honor—for his actions in the Vietnam War.

== Biography ==
Stout was one of at least three children. Stout enjoyed fast cars, country music, fishing, and hunting. At age 17, Mitchell Stout dropped out of Lenoir City High School in Tennessee and enlisted in the Army from Raleigh, North Carolina, in August 1967. He successfully completed paratrooper school before the Army discharged him after discovering his real age. By the time he was discharged, Stout was already 18 years old and immediately re-enlisted. Stout served as a Squad Leader. According to Stout's sister, Melody Woods, "love for his guys is what led him to volunteer for a second tour. He felt like he could offer them more than somebody that hadn’t been there before. That maybe he could help somebody". By March 12, 1970, he was serving as a Sergeant in Battery C, 1st Battalion, 44th Artillery Regiment. On that day, at Khe Gio Bridge in the Republic of Vietnam, Stout picked up an enemy-thrown grenade and used his body to shield his comrades at the expense of his own life.

Stout, aged 20 at his death, was buried in Virtue Cemetery, Farragut, Tennessee.

== Medal of Honor citation ==
Sergeant Stout's official Medal of Honor citation reads:

Sgt. Stout distinguished himself during an attack by a North Vietnamese Army Sapper company on his unit's firing position at Khe Gio Bridge. Sgt. Stout was in a bunker with members of a searchlight crew when the position came under heavy enemy mortar fire and ground attack. When the intensity of the mortar attack subsided, an enemy grenade was thrown into the bunker. Displaying great courage, Sgt. Stout ran to the grenade, picked it up, and started out of the bunker. As he reached the door, the grenade exploded. By holding the grenade close to his body and shielding its blast, he protected his fellow soldiers in the bunker from further injury or death. Sgt. Stout's conspicuous gallantry and intrepidity in action, at the cost of his own life, are in keeping with the highest traditions of the military service and reflect great credit upon him, his unit and the U.S. Army.

== Other ==
The 1st Battalion, 44th Air Defense Artillery Battalion Headquarters at Fort Hood is named in his honor.

The gym on main post Fort Bliss is also named in his honor.

SGT Stout is the only US Army Air Defense Artillerymen to earn the Medal of Honor.

The bridges on Interstate 75 across the Tennessee River near Lenoir City are named the "Mitchell W. Stout Medal of Honor Memorial Bridge".

In 2024, the M-SHORAD air defense vehicle based on the Stryker platform was officially named after Stout.

== See also ==
- List of Medal of Honor recipients
- List of Medal of Honor recipients for the Vietnam War
