= MV PFC James Anderson Jr. =

Cpl. Louis J. Hauge Jr.-class dry cargo ship

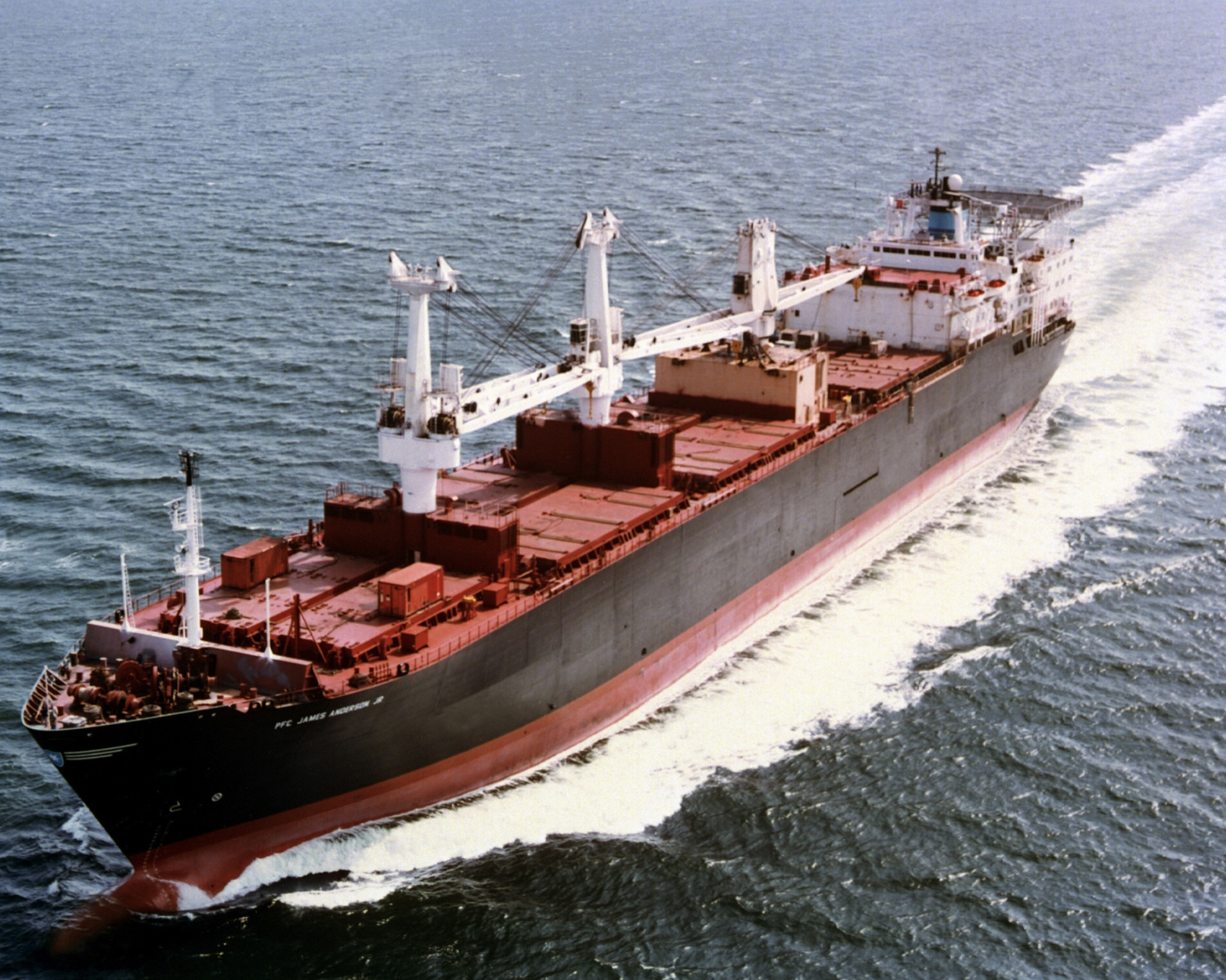
- MV PFC James Anderson Jr.

History

United States
- Name: PFC James Anderson Jr.
- Namesake: James Anderson Jr.
- Owner: Maersk Line
- Builder: Odense Staalskibsvaerft A/S
- Launched: 23 March 1979
- Completed: 1979
- Acquired: June 1979
- Renamed: Emma Mærsk (1979–1985)
- Stricken: 2009
- Identification: Callsign: WJXG; Hull number: AK-3002
- Honours and awards: See Awards
- Fate: Scrapped, 2009

General characteristics
- Class & type: Cpl. Louis J. Hauge Jr.-class cargo ship
- Displacement: 23,365 t (22,996 long tons), light; 46,484 t (45,750 long tons), full
- Length: 755 ft 5 in (230.25 m)
- Beam: 90 ft 0 in (27.43 m)
- Draft: 33 ft 10 in (10.31 m)
- Installed power: 1 × shaft; 16,800 hp (12,500 kW)
- Propulsion: 1 × Sulzer 7RND76M diesel engines; 2 × boilers
- Speed: 16.4 knots (30.4 km/h; 18.9 mph)
- Capacity: 120,080 sq. ft. vehicle; 1,283,000 gallons petroleum; 65,000 gallons water; 332 TEU
- Complement: 25 mariners and 11 technicians
- Aviation facilities: Helipad

MV PFC James Anderson Jr. (AK-3002), (former MV Emma Mærsk), was the third ship of the Cpl. Louis J. Hauge Jr.-class cargo ship built in 1979. The ship is named after Private First Class James Anderson Jr., an American Marine who was awarded the Medal of Honor during the Vietnam War.

== Construction and commissioning ==
The ship was built in 1979 at the Odense Staalskibsvaerft A/S, Lindø, Denmark. She was put into the service of Maersk Line as Emma Mærsk.

In 1983, she was acquired and chartered by the Navy under a long-term contract as MV PFC James. Anderson Jr. (AK-3002). The ship underwent conversion at the Bethlehem Steel at Sparrows Point, Massachusetts. She was assigned to Maritime Prepositioning Ship Squadron 3 and supported the US Marine Corps Expeditionary Brigade.

On 21 September 1990, she unloaded military cargos in support of Operation Desert Storm.

In 2009, the ship was struck from the Naval Register and later in August she was sold for scrap.

== Awards ==
- National Defense Service Medal
