= Lowell E. English =

U.S. Marine Corps Major General

Lowell Edward English
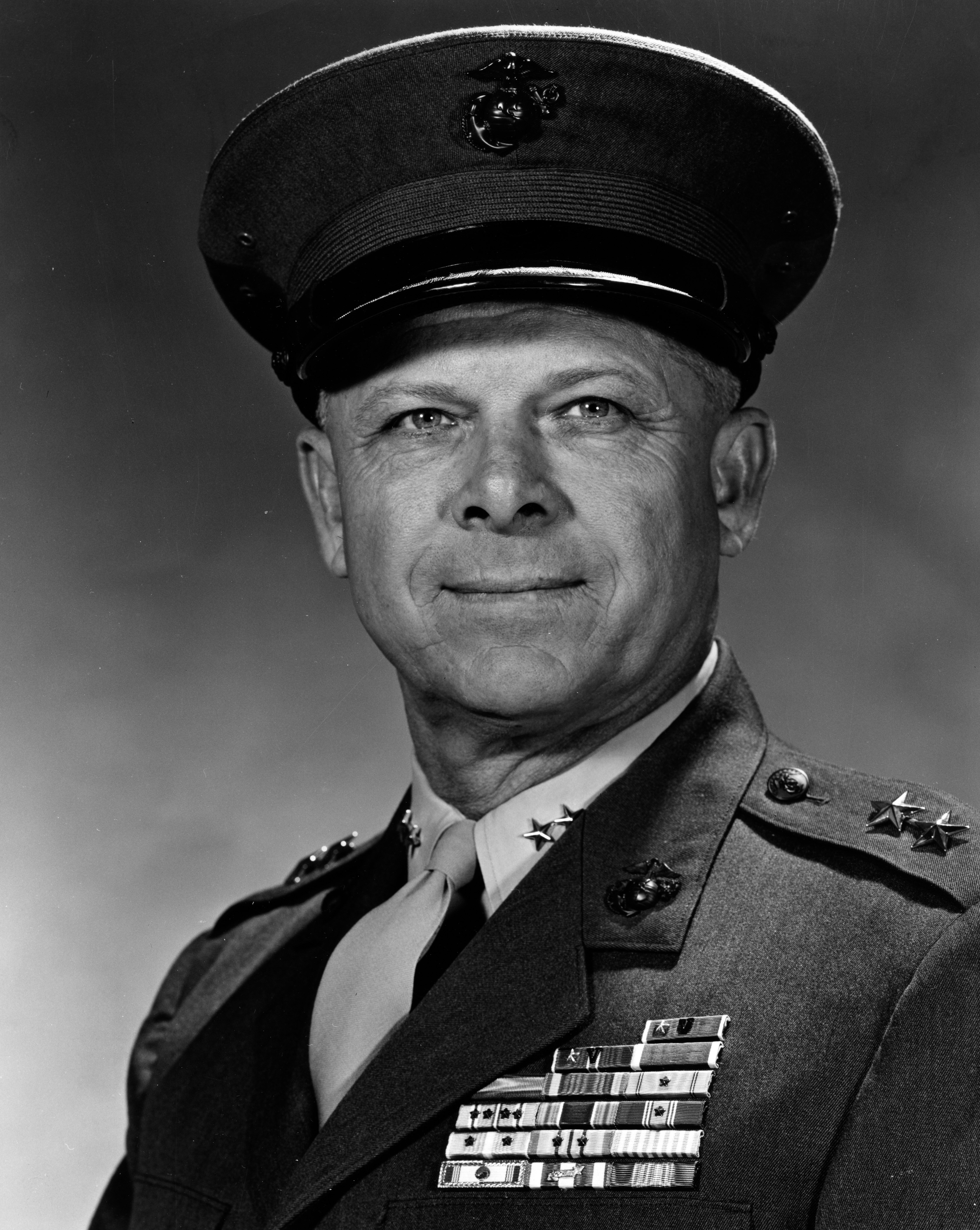
- MG Lowell E. English, USMC
- Born: July 8, 1915; Fairbury, Nebraska, US
- Died: September 26, 2005 (aged 90); San Diego, California, US
- Military career
- Allegiance: United States of America
- Branch: United States Marine Corps
- Service years: 1938–1969
- Rank: Major general
- Service number: 0-5838
- Commands: MCRD San Diego; The Basic School; 2nd Battalion, 21st Marines
- Conflicts: World War II: Bougainville Campaign; Recapture of Guam; Battle of Iwo Jima; Korean War: Jamestown Line; Vietnam War: Operation Texas; Operation Hastings; Operation Prairie
- Awards: Navy Distinguished Service Medal; Legion of Merit (2); Bronze Star (2); Purple Heart
- Other work: Director, San Diego Museum of Man

Lowell Edward English (July 8, 1915 – September 29, 2005) was a highly decorated officer in the United States Marine Corps who served in World War II, Korea, and Vietnam. He is most noted for his service as assistant division commander of 3rd Marine Division during the Vietnam War and, later, as commander of Task Force Delta. He rose to the rank of major general and completed his career in 1969 as commanding general of Marine Corps Recruit Depot San Diego.

== Early career ==
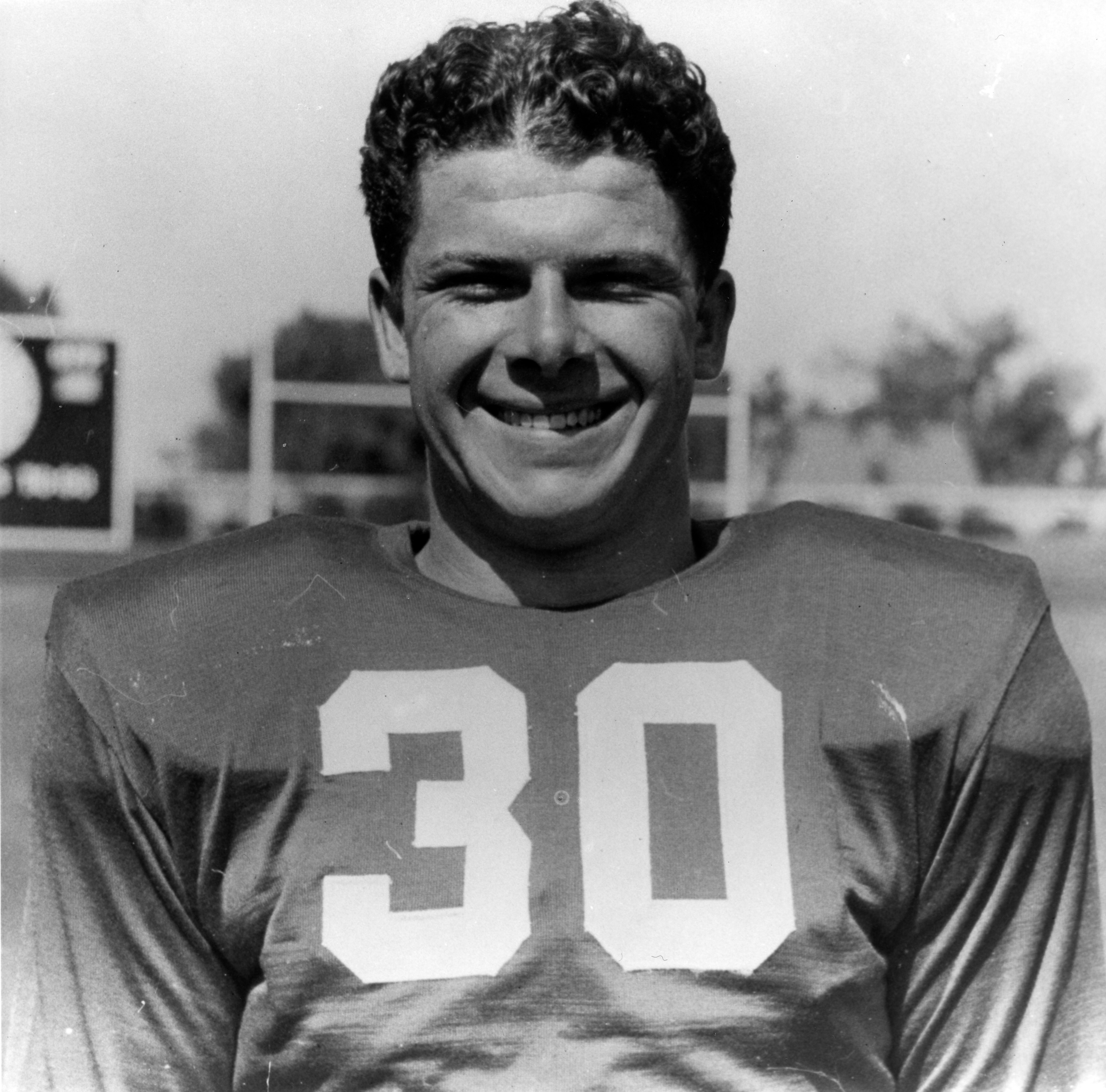
English played football for the University of Nebraska

English was born in Fairbury, Nebraska, on July 8, 1915, and completed high school in Lincoln, Nebraska. He attended the University of Nebraska and graduated in summer 1938 with a Bachelor of Arts degree. In college, he was a member of Army ROTC unit and also played three years for the varsity football team, which was one of the Big Six Champions at the time. He turned down an offer to play football with the Chicago Bears to join the Marine Corps.

On July 1, 1938, he was commissioned a second lieutenant in the Marines. English was ordered to the Basic School at the Philadelphia Navy Yard for basic officer training, which he completed in June 1939. During his time at the school, his instructors included many great names of Marine Corps history, including Leonard B. Cresswell, Chesty Puller, Roy M. Gulick, Howard N. Kenyon, and Russell N. Jordahl. Many of his classmates would gain renown or general's rank: Gregory Boyington, Hugh M. Elwood, Carl J. Fleps, Edward H. Hurst, Charles J. Quilter, Donn J. Robertson and Alvin S. Sanders.

English was subsequently attached to the Marine detachment aboard the battleship USS Nevada and participated in the patrol cruises in the Pacific Ocean.

After a year of sea duty, English was ordered to the Marine Corps Base San Diego, California, where he served as a recruit training officer. In December 1940, he joined the new 7th Defense Battalion under Lieutenant Colonel Lester A. Dessez. This new kind of Marine unit, created to defend Pacific islands from sea and air attack, had 5"/51 caliber guns, searchlights, aircraft sound locators, and antiaircraft batteries with M2 Browning and M1917 Browning machine guns.

English spent three months in intensive training. During this time, he married Eleanor R. McCallum on February 24, 1941. Their marriage would produce three children—Loellen Kay, Bruce Browning and Becky Lynne—and last until his death.

In March 1941, he sailed as platoon leader to Tutuila, American Samoa, where he participated in the Rainbow Five plans; helped train 1st Samoan Battalion, a native reserve unit; and was promoted to the rank of first lieutenant.

== World War II ==
After Japan attacked Pearl Harbor in December 1941, the Headquarters Marine Corps activated the 3rd Marine Regiment and deployed it to American Samoa in September 1942. English was promoted to captain and appointed company commander with 2nd Battalion. The 3rd Marines served in Defense Force, Samoan Group and underwent intensive jungle training. The regiment remained on American Samoa until May 1943, when it was ordered to New Zealand to reinforce the new 3rd Marine Division.

3rd Marine Division moved to the staging area on Guadalcanal in August 1943 and prepared to invade Bougainville in the North Solomon Islands. The 3rd Marine Division units were ordered to combat at the end of October and English participated in the Landing at Cape Torokina on November 1. He and his men faced heavy Japanese resistance and constant attacks of mosquitoes. He fought on Bougainville until Christmas Day of 1943, when 3rd Marines were ordered back to Guadalcanal for rest and refit.

English was promoted to major and transferred to 21st Marine Regiment, where he was appointed executive officer with 2nd Battalion under Lieutenant Colonel Eustace R. Smoak. He supervised the training of the regiment until July 1944, when it sailed to recapture Guam in the Mariana Islands. English went ashore with his battalion on July 21 and remained in the combat area until August 10. For his service on Guam, he was decorated with the Bronze Star Medal with Combat "V".

Even after Guam was declared secure, the 21st Marines patrolled its northern jungles for disorganized remnants of the enemy. After Smoak was promoted in late 1944, English was promoted to lieutenant colonel and appointed commander of 2nd Battalion, 21st Marines. He spent several months in training before the 21st Marines were ordered to Iwo Jima in February 1945.

The whole regiment was kept in reserve until February 21, when they landed under heavy enemy fire with orders to capture the high ground between Airfields No. 1 and No. 2. The scarred and pitted terrain made progress slow and costly. The 2nd Battalion suffered heavy casualties, and English was himself wounded on March 2, when a Japanese bullet went through his knee. His battalion was being rotated to the rear, but instead, he received orders to turn his men around and plug a gap in the front lines.

English later recalled the situation:

It was an impossible order. I couldn't move that disorganized battalion a mile back north in 30 minutes. We had taken very heavy casualties and were pretty well disorganized. I had less than 300 men left out of the 1200 I came ashore with. But the Commanding general of 3rd Marine Division, Graves B. Erskine, did not want excuses. "You tell that damned English he'd better be there; he told the regimental commander, Colonel Hartnoll J. Withers. I fired back, "You tell that son of a bitch I will be there, and I was, but my men were still half a mile behind me and I got a blast through the knee."

== Postwar service ==
Due to his wounds, English was relieved by his executive officer, Major George A. Percy, and ordered to the rear for treatment. For his service on Iwo Jima, English was decorated with the Legion of Merit with Combat "V" and also received the Purple Heart for his wounds.

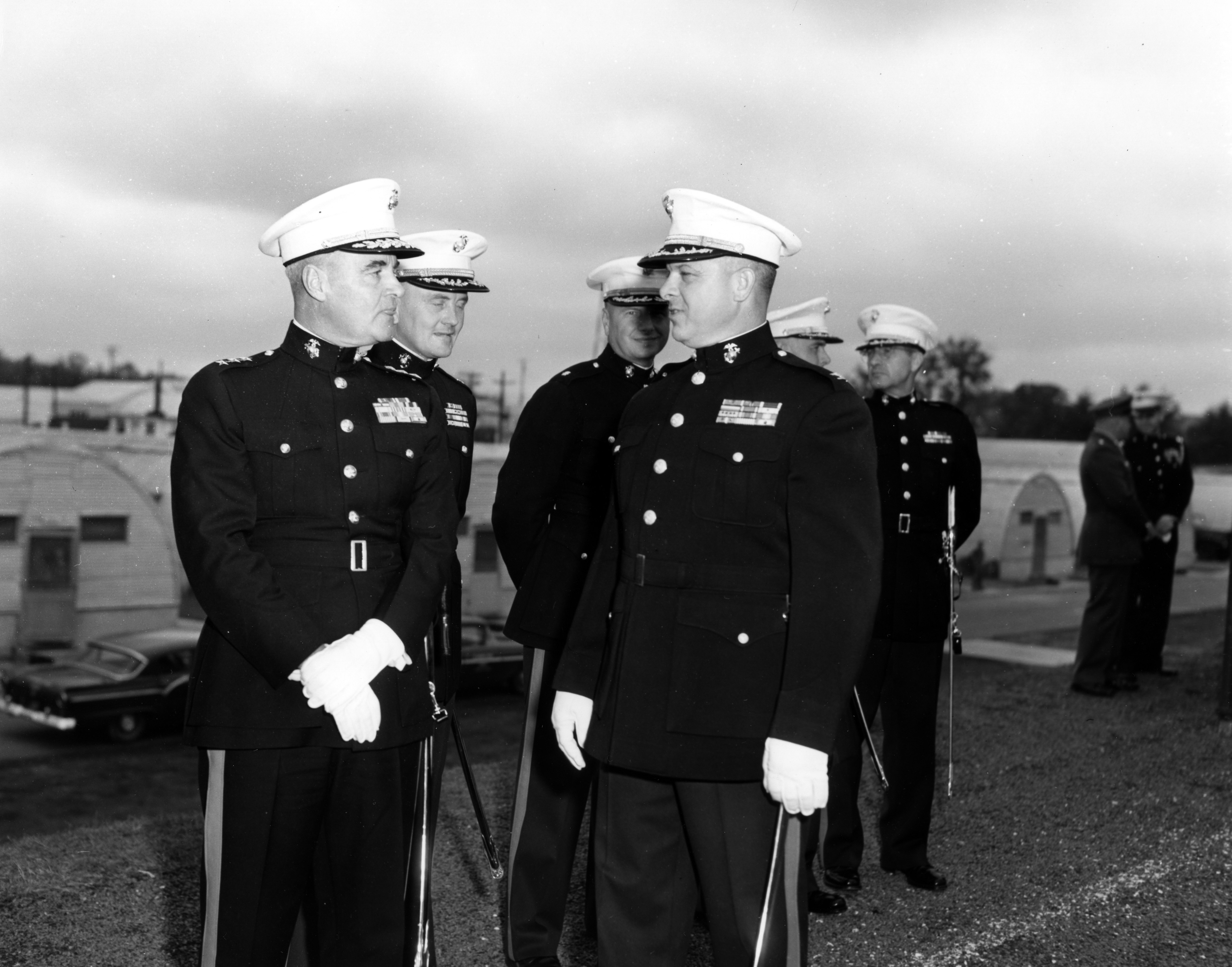
Lieutenant General Merrill B. Twining (left), Commandant, Marine Corps Schools, and Colonel Lowell E. English, Commanding officer, the Basic School, discuss the recent parade they have viewed at the Basic School.

He was back to the United States and after full recovery in September 1945, he assumed command of Guard Battalion, Replacement Training Command at Camp Pendleton, California. English held that command until early 1946, when he was ordered to the academic staff at the United States Naval Academy at Annapolis, Maryland, as a military psychology and leadership instructor. After three years in that capacity, he was transferred to the same position within United States Military Academy at West Point, New York, and remained there until fall of 1952.

English was then ordered to the instruction at Armed Forces Staff College at Norfolk, Virginia, which he completed in January 1953 and immediately left for Korea. He was attached to the 1st Marine Regiment as an executive officer and participated in the defense actions on the main line of resistance until April 1953, when he assumed command of 3rd Battalion, 1st Marines.

He held that command only for one month; the 1st Marine Regiment was ordered to reserve and English was attached to the headquarters of U.S. Eighth Army under Lieutenant General Maxwell D. Taylor as Marine liaison officer. He remained in Korea until early 1954, when he was ordered back to the United States. English was decorated with his second Legion of Merit with Combat "V" for his service with 1st Marines and also received his second Bronze Star Medal with Combat "V" for service with Eight Army.

After his return to the United States in May 1954, English was promoted to colonel and appointed chief of staff, Marine Corps Recruit Depot San Diego under Major General John C. McQueen. He remained in that capacity until June 1957, when he assumed command of Training and Test Regiment at Marine Corps Schools, Quantico. At Quantico, English was appointed commanding officer of The Basic School and was responsible for the basic training of newly commissioned officers until June 1960, when he was ordered to the instruction at Army War College at Carlisle Barracks, Pennsylvania.

He graduated in June 1961 and joined the Office of Assistant Secretary of Defense for International Security Affairs under Paul Nitze and served in that capacity until his promotion to brigadier general in August 1963. While in that capacity, English graduated from George Washington University with a master's degree in international relations.

English then served as chief of staff, U.S. Naval Forces, Eastern Atlantic and Mediterranean under Admiral Charles D. Griffin with headquarters in London, England. He returned to the United States in January 1964 and assumed duty as Deputy Chief of Plans Directorate of United States Strike Command under General Paul D. Adams at MacDill Air Force Base, Florida.

== Vietnam War ==
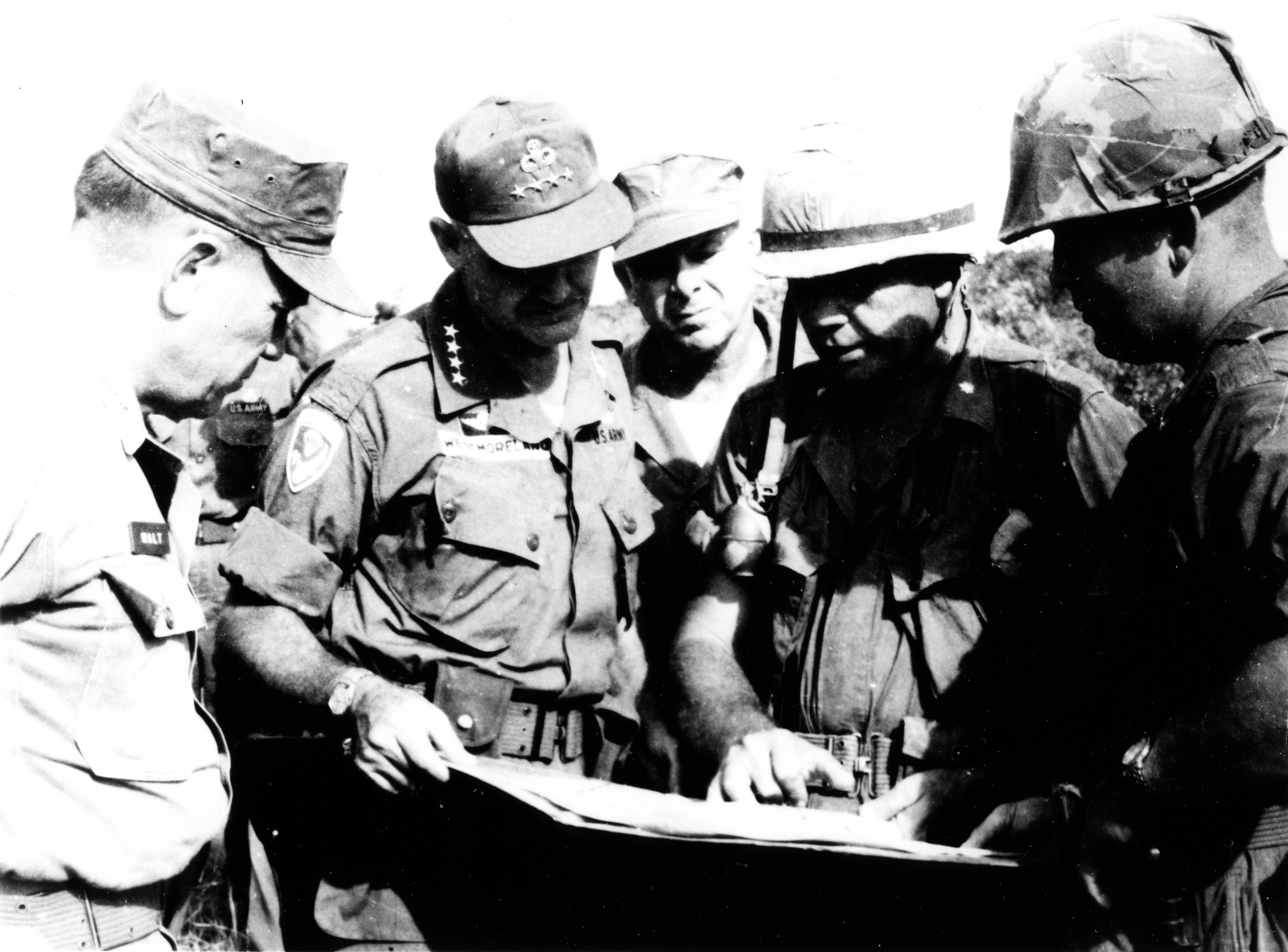
Map briefing during the Operations Hastings, Lewis W. Walt (right), General William C. Westmoreland (center) and English on his right

English was ordered to South Vietnam in December 1965 and joined 3rd Marine Division as assistant division commander under Major General Lewis W. Walt in Da Nang. He shared this responsibility with Brigadier General Jonas M. Platt, who served as second assistant division commander with headquarters at Chu Lai. The new commanding general of 3rd Marine Division, Wood B. Kyle, ordered English to move his headquarters to Phu Bai, where he assumed command of Task Force Delta.

The situation northwest of Quảng Ngãi, where Vietcong 1st Regiment overran the ARVN 936th Regional Force Company outpost at Hill 141 in the night of 18/19 March and the ARVN 2nd Division commander Hoàng Xuân Lãm asked the Marines for help in retaking the outpost. General Kyle launched Operation Texas and sent several Marine battalions into action. The Vietcong counterattacked. After two days of heavy combat, English assumed operational command of the operation and extended it towards the south of Quảng Ngãi. The Vietcong were driven off and Operation Texas concluded on March 25; the Marines had suffered 99 dead and 212 wounded and claimed that the Vietcong had 283 killed.

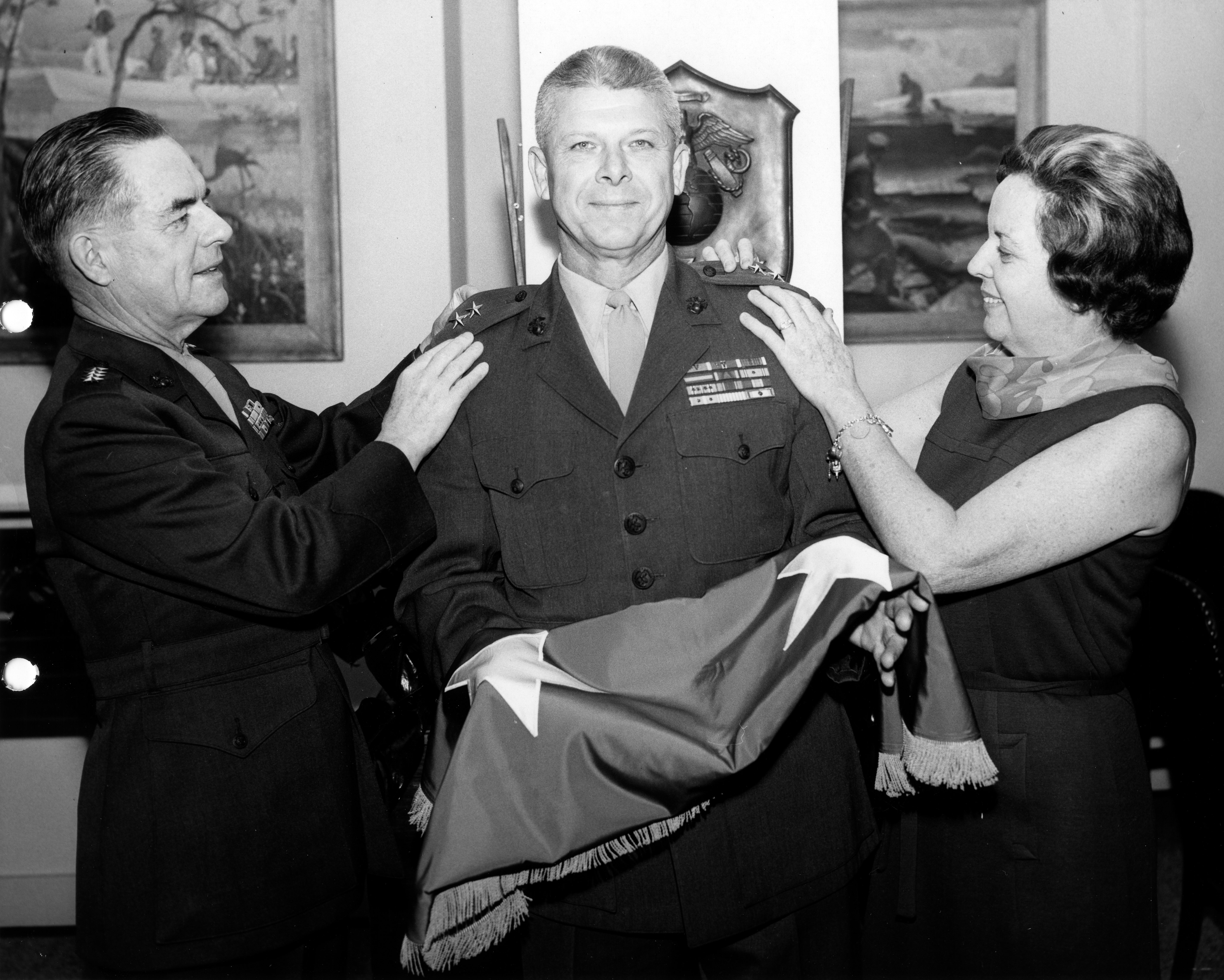
English being promoted to Major general by his wife Eleanor and Commandant Wallace M. Greene Jr.; Washington D.C., February 1967

In early July 1966, Marine reconnaissance reported NVA 324th Division in the vicinity of the Vietnamese Demilitarized Zone. On July 13, English received orders from General Kyle to reactivate Task Force Delta, consisting of four infantry battalions (2nd Battalion 1st Marines, 1st Battalion 3rd Marines, 2nd Battalion 4th Marines and 3rd Battalion 4th Marines), one artillery battalion (3rd Battalion 12th Marines), and supporting forces.

Operation Hastings began on July 15 to push the North Vietnamese Army (NVA) forces back across the Demilitarized Zone and the combat lasted until August 3. English used combined attacks of ground forces, artillery, airstrikes, and helicopter assaults and killed about 700 NVA soldiers. The Marine suffered 126 killed and many wounded.

The situation in Quảng Trị Province forced III Marine Amphibious Force's commander, general Lewis W. Walt, to launch a large operation to stop the PAVN 324th Division from crossing the demilitarized zone and invading Quang Tri Province. Operation Prairie, a series of actions in defense of the demilitarized zone, began on August 3, and English again led Task Force Delta.

Concerned by the growing PAVN activity along the DMZ and that PAVN units could move past the Marines' positions at the Rockpile and Dong Ha, COMUSMACV General William Westmoreland pushed III MAF to station a Marine battalion at Khe Sanh. English strongly opposed the plan, saying, "When you're at Khe Sanh, you're not really anywhere. It's far away from everything. You could lose it and you really haven't lost a damn thing."

English participated in the operation until the beginning of 1967, when he completed his tour in Vietnam. For his service with 3rd Marine Division and Task Force Delta, he received the Navy Distinguished Service Medal and also the Vietnam Gallantry Cross from the Government of South Vietnam.

== Later service and retirement ==
English returned to the United States at the beginning of 1967 and was promoted to major general on January 13. He assumed command of Marine Corps Recruit Depot San Diego, California, and was responsible for training recruits for duty with Marine Forces in South Vietnam. English served in this capacity until September 30, 1969, when he retired from the Marine Corps after 31 years of commissioned service. For his service in San Diego, he received his second Navy Distinguished Service Medal at his retirement ceremony.

English remained in San Diego, where he served as director of the San Diego Museum of Man for ten years until 1982. He was active in the Marine Corps Historical Foundation, where he received a Certificate of Appreciation by then-Commandant Robert H. Barrow for his contributions to the Oral History Program.

In 1991, English was diagnosed with Alzheimer's disease, and on September 29, 2005, he died at the age of 90 at the Silverado Senior Living assisted living community in San Diego, California.

== Military awards and decorations ==
Maj Gen English's awards include:

1st Row	Navy Distinguished Service Medal with one 5/16" Gold Star			
2nd Row	Legion of Merit with one 5/16" Gold Star and Combat "V"	Bronze Star Medal with one 5/16" Gold Star and Combat "V"	Purple Heart	Navy Presidential Unit Citation
3rd Row	Navy Unit Commendation	American Defense Service Medal with Base Clasp	Asiatic-Pacific Campaign Medal with four 3/16 inch service stars	World War II Victory Medal
4th Row	National Defense Service Medal with one star	Korean Service Medal with two 3/16 inch service stars	Vietnam Service Medal with three 3/16 inch service stars	United Nations Korea Medal
5th Row	Republic of Korea Presidential Unit Citation	Vietnam Gallantry Cross with Star	Vietnam Gallantry Cross Unit Citation	Vietnam Campaign Medal

== See also ==
- World War II
- Korean War
- Vietnam War
- Khe Sanh

Military offices
Preceded by Bruno A. Hochmuth	Commanding General, Marine Corps Recruit Depot San Diego; February 1, 1967 - September 3, 1969	Succeeded by John N. McLaughlin
Preceded by William K. Jones	Commanding Officer, The Basic School; July 1958 - June 1960	Succeeded by Louis H. Wilson Jr.
