= Camp Carroll =

United States Marine Corps artillery base in Vietnam

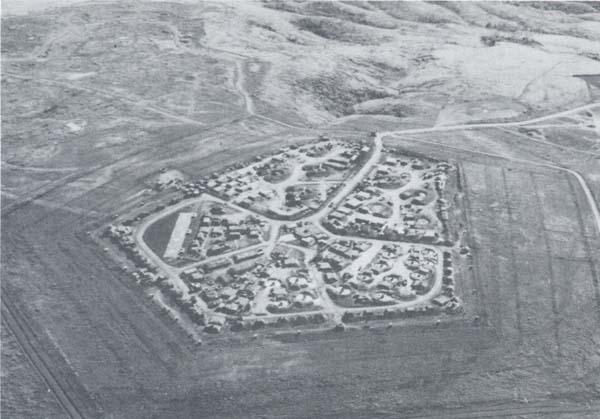
- An overhead shot of Camp Carroll

Site information
- Type: Marine Base
- Condition: Abandoned

Location
- Coordinates: 16°45′47″N 106°55′50″E

Site history
- Built: 1966
- In use: 1966–-72
- Battles/wars: Vietnam War

Garrison information
- Occupants: (United States) 3rd Marine Division (South Vietnam) 1st Division; 3rd Division

Camp Carroll (also known as Artillery Plateau, Firebase Tan Lam and Hill 241) was a United States Marine Corps and Army of the Republic of Vietnam (ARVN) artillery base during the Vietnam War. It was located 8 km southwest of Cam Lộ, Quang Tri Province. Camp Carroll was also at the centroid of a large arc of the strategic Highway 9 corridor south of the Vietnamese Demilitarized Zone (DMZ), which made it a key facility.

== History ==
=== 1966–70 ===
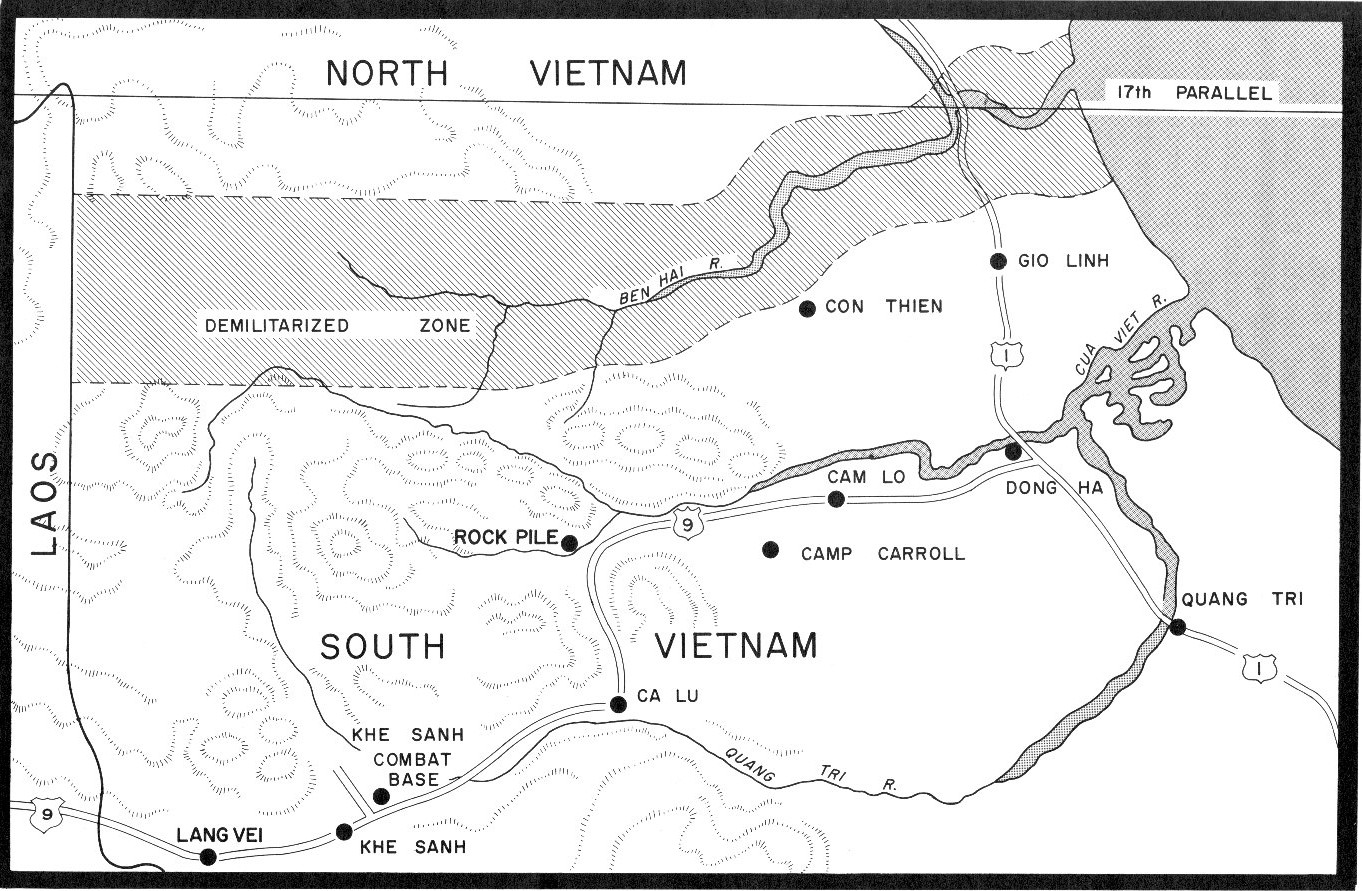
Map showing Camp Carroll's location near the DMZ

The 3rd Marine Division had overall command and control of the DMZ area. The camp was commissioned on 10 November 1966 (aka Camp J. J. Carroll) and became home for the 3rd Marine Regiment. The camp was named after Navy Cross recipient Captain James J. Carroll, who was the commanding officer of Kilo Company, 3rd Battalion, 4th Marines, and was killed by friendly tank fire on 5 October 1966 during Operation Prairie. It was one of nine artillery bases constructed along the DMZ and had 80 artillery pieces including M107 175mm guns from the United States Army; the longest ranged American field artillery pieces, the 175mm could fire a 150-pound projectile 32,690 meters and effectively return fire on any enemy gun that could hit it. The 175mm guns put Camp Carroll on the map, particularly the tactical maps of the North Vietnamese forward observers.

Camp Carroll diminished in significance after the 1968 Tet Offensive. The 3rd Marine Division began relying on highly mobile postures rather than remaining in their fixed positions as sitting targets and Camp Carroll was inactivated on 28 December 1968. Camp Carroll became an Army of the Republic of Vietnam (ARVN) base.

=== 1972 ===
On 30 March 1972, the North Vietnamese People's Army of Vietnam (PAVN) launched their Easter Offensive. PAVN rockets and artillery shells slammed into Camp Carroll as the opening phase of the First Battle of Quảng Trị. The base received more than 200 rounds of 130mm fire in the first hour of the attack. On 2 April 1972, ARVN Lieutenant Colonel Pham Van Dinh, commander of the 56th Regiment, 3rd Division, surrendered the facility to the PAVN. Fifteen hundred ARVN troops were captured along with 22 artillery pieces, including a six-gun battery of M107s and numerous quad-50's and twin-40's, the largest artillery assemblage in I Corps. B-52 strikes were ordered against Camp Carroll in an effort to deny its use to the PAVN. However, the PAVN removed the 175mm guns from the camp before the strikes could occur. These guns were later used against the ARVN.

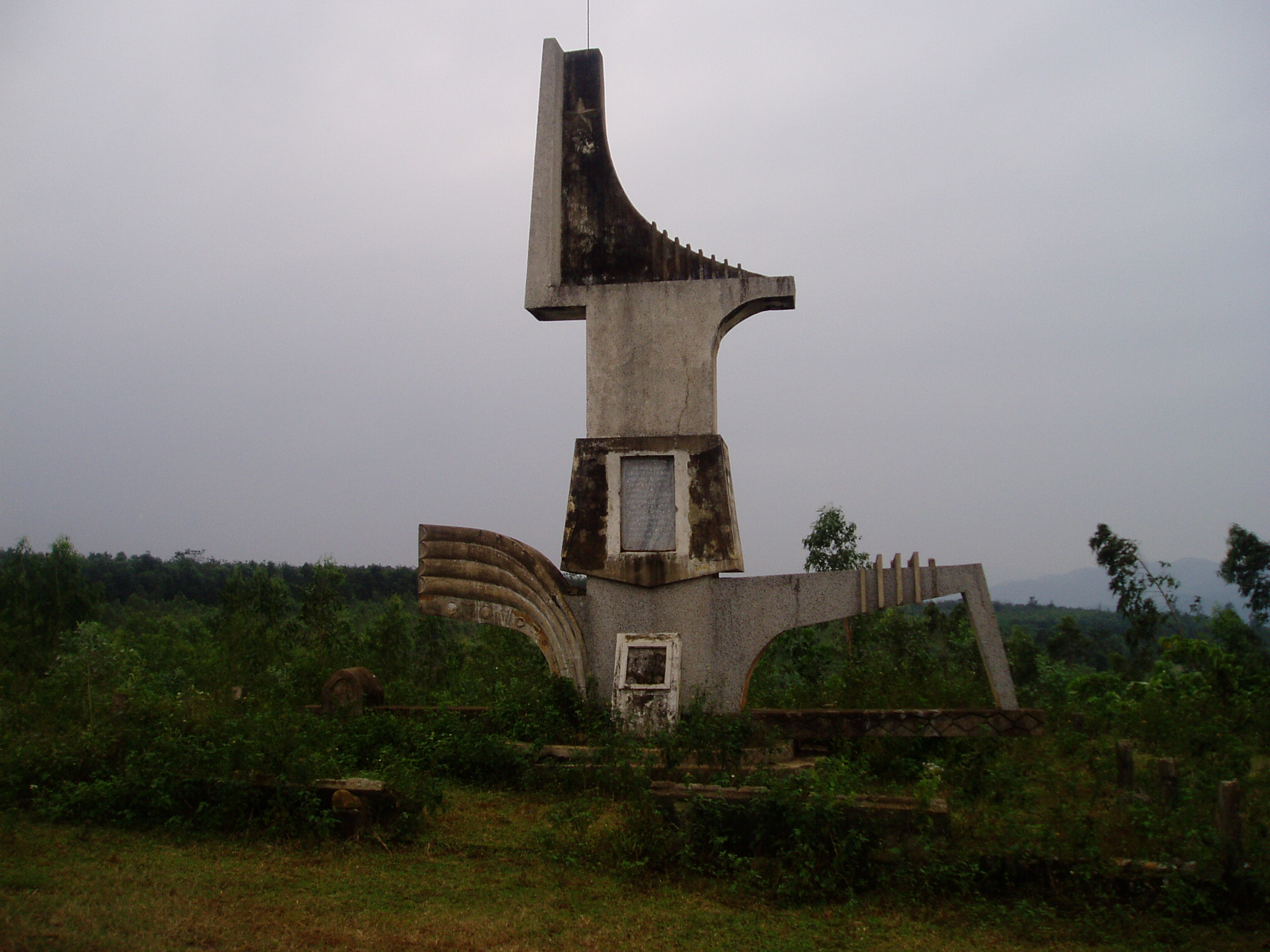
Vietnamese monument that stands at the former entrance to Camp Carroll

== Current use ==
At present the land belongs to Xi Nghiep Ho Tieu Lam, the Vietnamese state-operated pepper enterprise.
