= Cam Lộ Combat Base =

Cam Lộ Combat Base
- Cam Lộ, Quảng Trị province in Vietnam
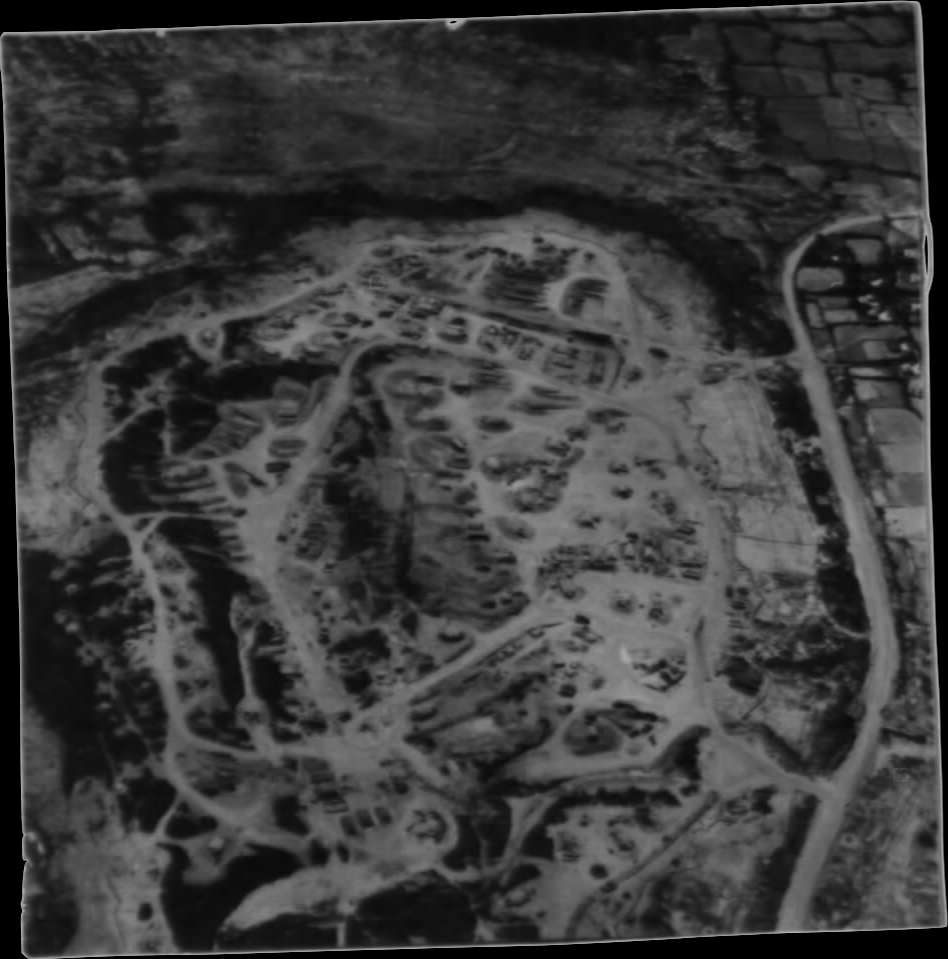
- A 1968 aerial view of Cam Lo

Site information
- Type: Military base
- Operator: Army of the Republic of Vietnam (ARVN); United States Marine Corps (USMC); United States Army (U.S. Army)
- Condition: Abandoned

Location
- Shown within Vietnam
- Coordinates: 16.812°N 106.993°E

Site history
- Built: 1966
- In use: 1966-1972
- Battles/wars: Vietnam War; Battle of Con Thien; Easter Offensive

Garrison information
- Garrison: 3rd Marine Division; ARVN 1st Division; ARVN 3rd Division

Cam Lộ Combat Base (also known as Hill 37 or simply Cam Lộ) is a former U.S. Marine Corps, U.S. Army and Army of the Republic of Vietnam (ARVN) base northwest of Quảng Trị in central Vietnam.

== History ==
=== 1966–67 ===
The base was established in the town of Cam Lộ 15 km west of Đông Hà and 20 km (12 mi) northwest of Quảng Trị between Highway 9 and the Miêu Giang or Cam Lộ River only approximately 7 km (4.3 mi) south of the Vietnamese Demilitarized Zone (DMZ).

On 22 June the Marines' "Task Force Charlie" comprising two Force Reconnaissance Companies, Companies from 2nd Battalion 1st Marines and 3/4 Marines and Battery H 3rd Battalion, 12th Marines deployed to Đông Hà Combat Base and Cam Lộ. On 28 June a People's Army of Vietnam (PAVN) mortar attack on Cam Lộ killed two Marines and wounded five.

On 14 July in preparation for Operation Hastings, General Lowell English established his command post at Cam Lộ with security provided by 1st Battalion, 3rd Marines and artillery support from the 3rd Battalion, 12th Marines. Following the completion of Operation Hastings, the artillery and tanks from the 3rd Tank Battalion remained at Cam Lộ with security provided by 2 Companies from 2/4 Marines. The artillery and tanks were used to support Marine patrols into the DMZ as part of Operation Prairie.

On the early morning of 26 August the 812th Regiment of the PAVN 324B Division attacked Cam Lộ resulting in 9 Marines killed and 20 wounded.

From February–March 1967 the Marines launched Operation Prairie II a series of sweeps from Cam Lộ to Con Thien resulting in 93 Marines and 694 PAVN killed.

In March 1967 Route 9 west of Cam Lộ was reopened to Khe Sanh for the first time since 1964. The road would suffer numerous ambushes making it dangerous if not altogether unusable.

Cam Lộ was intended to form a supporting base for the McNamara Line and provided artillery support USMC forces engaged at Con Thien. Route 561 which ran from Cam Lộ was the main supply route to Con Thien Cam Lộ formed one corner of what became known as Leatherneck Square, with the other corners being Con Thien, Firebase Gio Linh and Đông Hà Combat Base.

=== 1968–69 ===
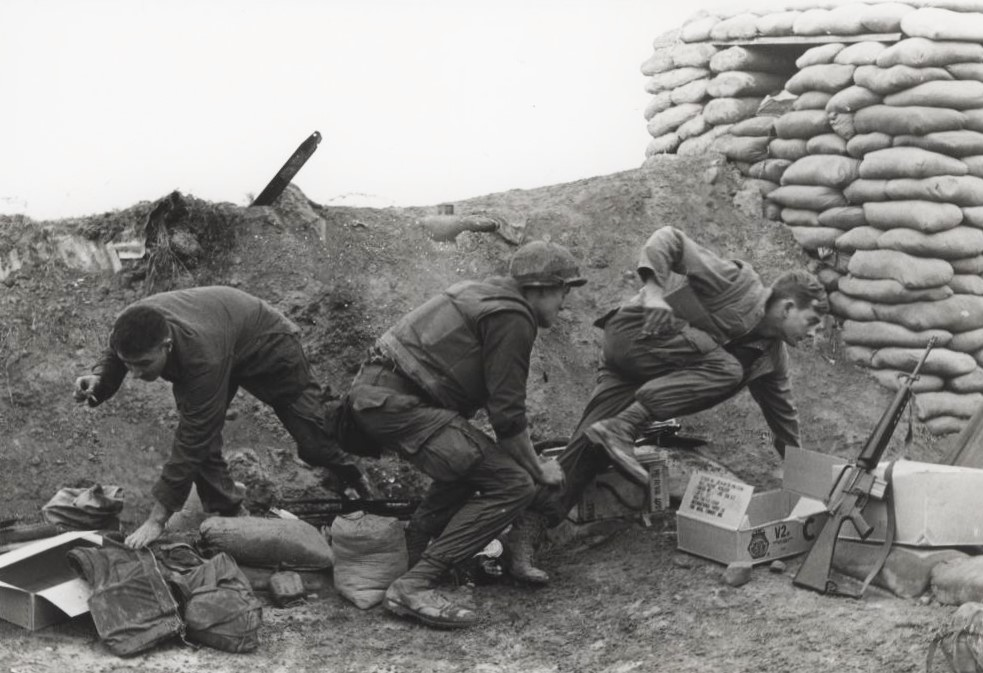
Company H, 2/4 Marines rush for cover during an attack on Cam Lo Combat Base

In January 1968 Cam Lộ was occupied by artillery of the 2nd Battalion, 12th Marines with security provided by the 2nd Battalion, 9th Marines.

At 02:15 on 2 February the Vietcong 27th Independent Battalion attacked the Cam Lộ district headquarters resulting in 3 U.S. and 111 Vietcong killed. CPL Larry L. Maxam would be posthumously awarded the Medal of Honor for his actions during the engagement.

The 1st Battalion, 11th Infantry was based at Cam Lộ from July to October 1968, being replaced by the 2nd Battalion, 3rd Marines.

In July 1969 3rd Battalion, 3rd Marines assumed responsibility for the Cam Lộ area.

In September 1969 as part of Operation Keystone Cardinal the 3rd Marine Division began its withdrawal from Vietnam and by early October the Marines had handed over control of their tactical area of operations (including the Cam Lộ base) to the 1st Brigade, 5th Infantry Division.

During these years, rotating Navy Mobile Construction Battalions, including MCB74 Detail Victor, also located on the east side of Cam Lo, operated a rock crusher operation for the multi Seabee Battalion work paving Route 9 from Dong Ha west. These Seeabees also operated a rock quarry between Cam Lo and Khe Sanh on the south side of the Cam Lo River. Detail Victor Seabees also provided support to the Cam Lo combat base

=== 1970–72 ===
By January 1972 the ARVN 3rd Division had assumed responsibility for the area north of Highway 9. The PAVN launched their Easter Offensive on 30 March 1972 and by 1 April had broken through the ARVN defensive positions along the DMZ and north of the Cam Lo River. On the afternoon of 2 April the road and rail bridges at Đông Hà were destroyed temporarily halting the advance of PAVN armor down Route 1, however at 18:00 a USAF EB-66 was shot down west of Đông Hà and a no fire zone was imposed around the area allowing the PAVN to capture the Cam Lo Bridge intact. PAVN forces moved across the bridge rolling up ARVN defensive positions south of the river before finally being halted south of Quảng Trị. Cam Lộ would remain in North Vietnamese hands for the rest of the war.

== Current use ==
The base has been turned over to housing. It sits near the museum for the headquarters of the Provisional Revolutionary Government of the Republic of South Vietnam.
