= Operation Lancaster II =

US Marine Corps operation in Vietnam

- Part of the Vietnam War
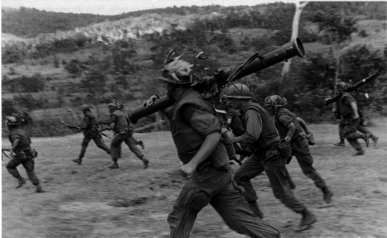
- BLT 2nd Battalion, 4th Marines Marines advance during Operation Lancaster II
Date	20 January – 23 November 1968
Location	Quảng Trị Province, South Vietnam 16.579°N 106.753°E
Result	U.S. operational success

Belligerents
United States	North Vietnam

Commanders and leaders
MG Rathvon M. Tompkins; MG Raymond G. Davis; Col. William L. Dick; Col. Edward J. Miller	

Strength
3rd Battalion, 1st Marines; 1st Battalion, 3rd Marines; 3rd Battalion, 3rd Marines; 1st Battalion, 4th Marines; 2nd Battalion, 4th Marines; 3rd Battalion, 4th Marines; 1st Battalion, 9th Marines; 2nd Battalion, 9th Marines; 3rd Battalion, 9th Marines; 3rd Tank Battalion; 44th Air Defense Artillery Regiment	320th Division

Casualties and losses
359 killed	U.S. body count: 1,800+ killed 913 weapons recovered

Operation Lancaster II was a U.S. Marine Corps security operation that took place in northern Quảng Trị Province, South Vietnam from 20 January to 23 November 1968 during the Vietnam War. The operation followed on directly from Operation Lancaster. The Marines patrolled aggressively. The response of the People's Army of Vietnam (PAVN) was mixed; prolonged lulls alternated with fierce fighting. Broadly the Marines felt that they were successful in maintaining the supply route to Ca Lu, at the terminus of Route 9, and in, at least intermittently, disrupting PAVN communications.

The operation ended with the Lancaster operational area being absorbed into the Scotland II and Kentucky operational areas. By the close of the operation the Marines had lost 359 killed; they calculated that PAVN fatalities were in excess of 1,800.

== Background ==
U.S. involvement in the Vietnam War escalated from 1960 under President John F. Kennedy, with troop levels gradually surging from just under a thousand in 1959 to 16,000 in 1963. President Lyndon B. Johnson authorized to increase U.S. military presence, deploying ground combat units for the first time and increasing troop levels to 184,000. Every year onward there was significant build-up despite little progress. U.S. and South Vietnamese forces relied on air superiority and overwhelming firepower to conduct search and destroy operations, involving ground forces, artillery and airstrikes.

== Prelude ==
Following the conclusion of Operation Lancaster on 20 January 1968, the 2nd Battalion, 9th Marines and the 3rd Battalion, 9th Marines continued the operation in the same area now under the command of Col. William L. Dick's 4th Marine Regiment. The Lancaster operational area included the Marine bases at Camp Carroll (headquarters for the 4th Marine Regiment), Ca Lu Combat Base and The Rockpile and the main security responsibility was to keep Route 9 open to Ca Lu.

== Operation ==
=== January ===
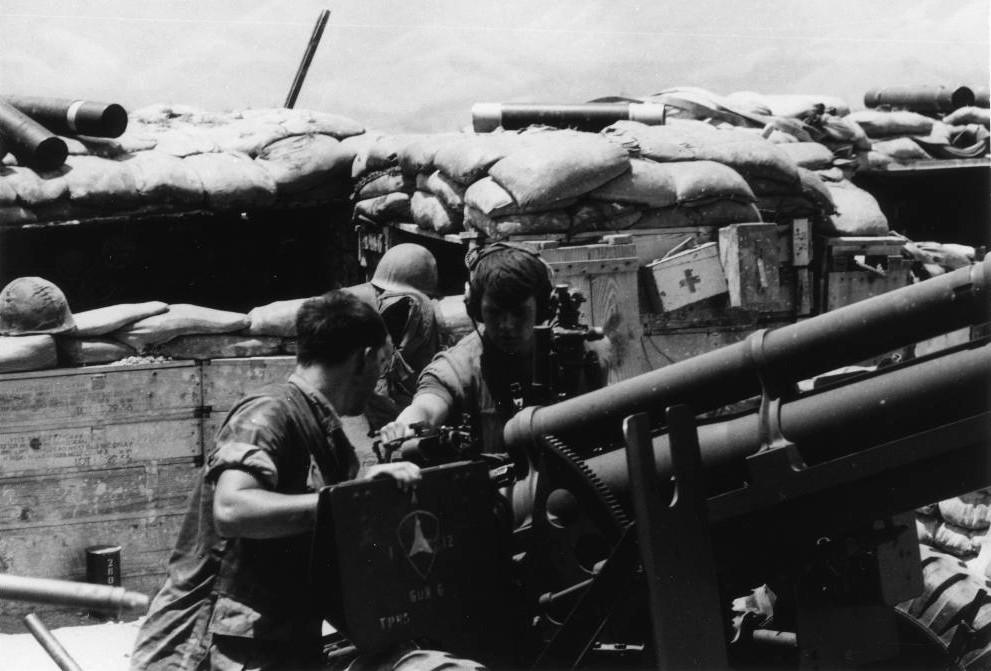
Battery A, 1/12 Marines prepare to fire their 105 mm gun in 1969

On 20 January People's Army of Vietnam (PAVN) artillery and rockets firing from across the Vietnamese Demilitarized Zone (DMZ) hit Camp Carroll causing little damage. At 13:30 on 24 January elements of the PAVN 320th Division ambushed a Marine "Rough Rider" convoy on Route 9, 3 km (1.9 mi) from Camp Carroll (16.79°N 106.931°E). The 4th Marines at Camp Carroll sent a reaction force of Company H 2/9 Marines, 2 M48s and an M67 flame thrower tank from Company B, 3rd Tank Battalion and 2 M42 Dusters from Company C, 44th Air Defense Artillery Regiment to assist the convoy. The PAVN were ready for the reaction force and immobilized the lead M48 with recoilless rifle fire killing the company commander. The Marines engaged the PAVN who only withdrew at 18:30 with the arrival of two UH-1E helicopter gunships overhead. The Marines lost eight dead while only three PAVN were killed.

3rd Marine Division commander MG Rathvon M. Tompkins responded to this threat to Route 9 by transferring 3rd Battalion, 4th Marines to the Lancaster area of operations to sweep Route 9. On the afternoon of 24 January the 3/4 Marines command group was landed at Camp Carroll and by 19:00 Company M, 3/4 Marines had established a perimeter at the ambush site. At 06:30 on 25 January Company M left its night defensive position and a platoon established a defensive position on a hill overlooking Route 9 (named "Mike's Hill") (16.796°N 106.941°E) while the rest of the Company policed the ambush site recovering 4 Marine dead. At 09:15 the Marines at the ambush site were hit by PAVN machine gun fire losing two Marines killed, the Marines quickly overran the PAVN position killing three and capturing a light machine gun. Company M then returned to its hilltop defensive position and Companies I and L arrived later that day forming a defensive perimeter on both side of Route 9 which the PAVN proceeded to mortar throughout the night. On 26 January the 3/4 Marines discovered that during the night the PAVN had destroyed the bridge over the Cam Lộ River just east of their night defensive position, they patrolled around Route 9 recovering abandoned PAVN equipment and then formed 3 night defensive positions on hills overlooking Route 9, including Mike's Hill. During the night of 26/27 January Company M on Mike's Hill could hear PAVN soldiers talking as they moved around the position. At 05:00 the PAVN attacked Mike's Hill from 3 sides in what was described as a "wild melee" that continued into the afternoon. The Marines on Mike's Hill fought back using up much of their ammunition while the other companies on the nearby hills supported them with mortar fire. A Company M ambush squad at the site of the destroyed bridge was surrounded and had to be rescued by Company L which killed 23 PAVN and captured three. Later that afternoon as Company I moved 1 km east to join up with Company L at the bridge site it was ambushed by an entrenched PAVN company and called for reinforcements. With the addition of the reserve platoon and the support of UH-1E gunships, Company I overran the PAVN position and joined up with Company L. The Marines had lost 21 dead while more than 130 PAVN had been killed and three 57mm recoilless rifles, two 60mm mortars and 33 AK-47s captured. On 28 January 3/4 Marines continued to patrol Route 9 finding a tunnel complex containing PAVN dead, after destroying this complex 3/4 Marines returned to Camp Carroll following which B-52 strikes hit suspected PAVN positions nearby. On 29 January Company H 2/9 Marines returned to the area to provide security for engineers to repair the damaged bridge, they met little opposition and located 30 dead PAVN in the area. By 15:30 the engineers had constructed a bypass road and Route 9 was reopened.

=== February–May ===
The Lancaster area remained relatively quiet throughout February with only harassment by fire as the PAVN concentrated their efforts in the Scotland, Kentucky and Napoleon/Saline areas of operation.

On the afternoon of 14 February after completing an unsuccessful search for suspected PAVN mortars on the high ground in the hills 3 km west of Ca Lu Combat Base, Company K, 3/9 Marines had started down towards Route 9. PAVN 60mm mortars and small arms fire caught the company in the open (16.6729°N 106.8613°E) resulting in 13 killed and over 40 wounded. While evacuating all of the wounded, the helicopters received heavy small arms fire and the Marines had to leave behind four of the dead. Marine reconnaissance team DELMAR finally retrieved the bodies on 6 March.

On 28 February PAVN antiaircraft fire shot down a Marine CH-46 near Ca Lu Combat Base killing all 22 passengers and crew. During February the Marines lost 58 dead while killing 85 PAVN.

During March the Marines lost 13 dead while killing 60 PAVN. On 28 March, in preparation for Operation Pegasus, the relief of Khe Sanh Combat Base, the 1st Cavalry Division took over Ca Lu Combat Base and established Landing Zone Stud in the Lancaster II operational area.

On 30 April the 3/9 Marines were moved by helicopter to the Kentucky operational area near Con Thien.

By late May Col. Edward J. Miller had assumed command of the 4th Marine Regiment and the forces deployed in the Lancaster operational area comprised the 3/4 Marines and 2/9 Marines at Camp Carroll and BLT 3rd Battalion, 1st Marines, 1st Battalion, 4th Marines and BLT 2nd Battalion, 4th Marines at the Rockpile and Ca Lu Combat Base.

On 6 June the 9th Marine Regiment assumed control of the Lancaster operational area from the 4th Marines. May–June saw minimal PAVN activity with occasional mines and small ambushes along Route 9 and rocket attacks on Camp Carroll and LZ Stud. On 21 June 1/9 Marines secured the village of Thon Duc Kinh 4 km southeast of Camp Carroll for the resettlement of Montagnard villagers. In late June control of the Lancaster sector passed briefly to Task Force Hotel commanded by BG Carl W. Hoffman.

=== June–November ===
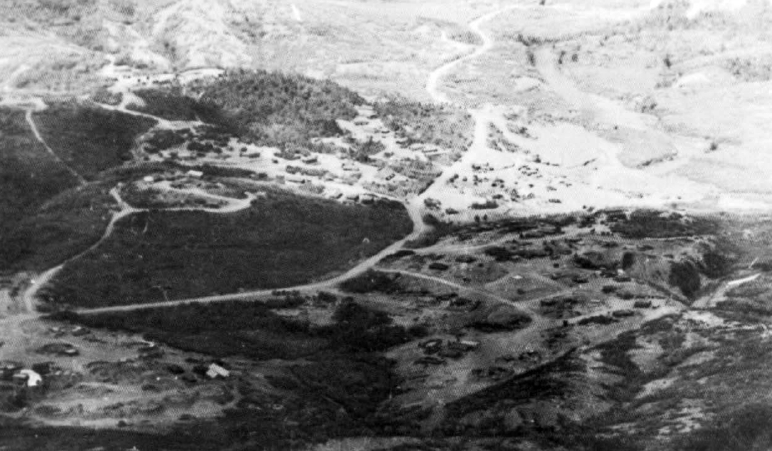
Ca Lu Combat Base

On 9 July 1st Battalion, 3rd Marines arrived at LZ Stud to replace the 1/4 Marines. On 10 July the 3rd Marine Regiment assumed responsibility for the Lancaster sector. On 11 July Task Force Hotel took control of 1/3 Marines at LZ Stud and they were transported by helicopter to Hill 715, west of LZ Stud which was the suspected base area of the PAVN 8th Battalion, 29th Regiment. One CH-46 was shot down during the assault with no Marine losses. 1/3 Marines swept the area over the next 4 days locating abandoned PAVN positions and suffering loses due to sniper fire and command-detonated mines before returning to LZ Stud on 15 July. On 25 July 1/3 Marines returned to Hill 715 to recover the bodies of 2 Marines killed in the earlier operation, they were met by heavy PAVN fire, mines and booby-traps but were unable to close with any PAVN forces, after recovering the 2 dead Marines and destroying PAVN supplies they returned to LZ Stud on 4 August. Also on 25 July BLT 2/4 Marines was landed on Hill 679 12 km west of LZ Stud to patrol the area to the north. On 29 July as 2/4 Marines approached Hill 606 (16.722°N 106.765°E) 4 km north of Hill 679 they walked into a PAVN ambush losing 4 Marines killed. After securing Hill 606 2/4 Marines then searched the Khe Giang Thoan Valley locating PAVN rocket launch site and destroying 20 tons of supplies. An attack on Company G's night defensive position resulted in four Marines killed. On 6 August 2/4 Marines was extracted and returned to LZ Stud, now renamed Vandegrift Combat Base.

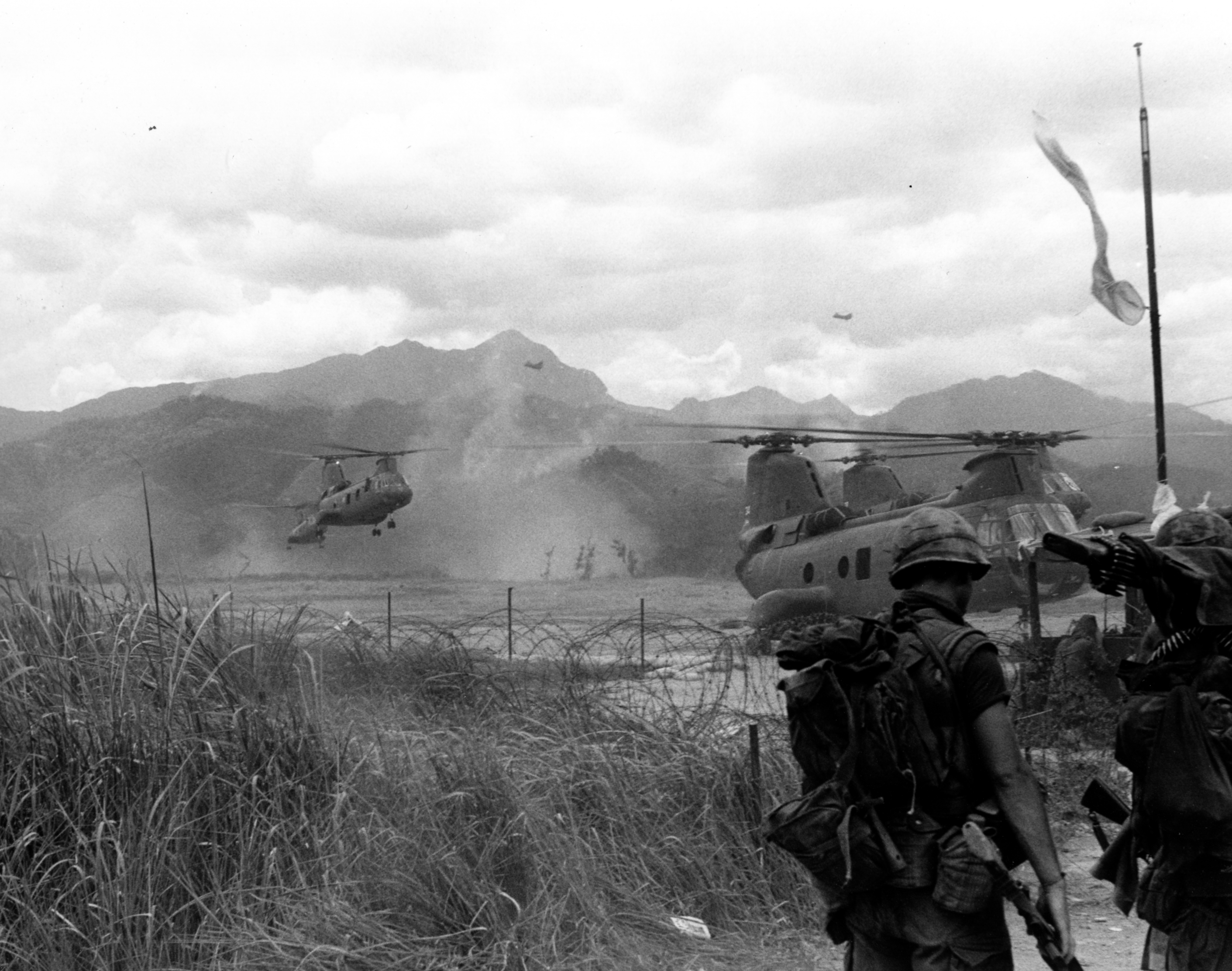
2nd Battalion, 3rd Marines prepare to board CH-46s at the Rockpile

In mid-June Task Force Hotel received intelligence that the PAVN were infiltrating the area north of the Rockpile and began planning a sweep of the area, however due to a shortage of forces an operation could not be launched until mid-July. On 17 July 2/3 Marines, 2/9 Marines and 3/9 Marines were landed in "Helicopter Valley" while 1/9 Marines established blocking positions to the east and the Army of the Republic of Vietnam (ARVN) 1st and 2nd Battalions, 2nd Regiment established blocking positions in the Cam Lộ Valley northwest of the Rockpile. As Company K 9th Marines moved north from its landing zone towards Mutter's Ridge they were engaged by an entrenched PAVN company-sized force, following airstrikes the Marines overran the position killing 38 PAVN for the loss of 9 Marines. On 21 July as 2/9 Marines moved north towards the DMZ they were hit by mortar fire killing one Marine, they subsequently located the mortar team killing 20 with small arms and airstrikes. Denied permission to enter the DMZ the Marines swept the area locating PAVN bunkers and supplies including 2 75mm pack howitzers. On 27 July 1/3 Marines and 3/3 Marines were landed at Landing Zones Margo, Joan and Becky in the upper Cam Lo basin and on Dong Ha Mountain, establishing Firebase Fuller there, but the PAVN avoided contact. The unnamed "July Action" operation concluded on 3 August and was regarded as a success as the Marines adopted new more mobile tactics aimed at disrupting PAVN supply lines rather than being tied to the defense of large bases along the DMZ.

From September to November apart from mines on Route 9 and the occasional mortar attack on the large bases, most of the PAVN activity in the Lancaster area was centered on Landing Zones Mack and Sierra on Mutter's Ridge. On 21 November 1/3 Marines was redeployed from its positions on Mutter's Ridge to Strongpoint C-1 north of the Cửa Việt River.

== Aftermath ==
Operation Lancaster II concluded on 23 November 1968 and the Lancaster operational area was absorbed into the Scotland II and Kentucky operational areas. Marine losses were 359 killed while PAVN losses exceeded 1,800 with 913 weapons captured.
