= Landing Zone Sierra =

Site information
- Type: Marines

Location
- Coordinates: 16.839°N 106.821°E

Site history
- Built: 1968
- In use: 1968-9
- Battles/wars: Vietnam War

Garrison information
- Occupants: 3rd Marine Division

Landing Zone Sierra was a U.S. Marine Corps base located northwest of Cam Lộ, Quảng Trị Province in central Vietnam.

== History ==
The base was located on Mutter's Ridge north of The Rockpile, approximately 16 km northwest of Cam Lo.

On 15 November 1968, a 1st Battalion 3rd Marines patrol near Sierra was ambushed by a People's Army of Vietnam (PAVN) force resulting in 7 Marines killed.

On 2 March 1969 the 1st Battalion 4th Marines began Operation Purple Martin north of the Rockpile to engage the PAVN 246th Regiment which was believed to be located in the area. After retaking Landing Zone Mack, on 13 March the Marines moved along the ridgeline to retake Landing Zone Sierra which had been abandoned two months earlier and was now used by the PAVN to mortar Marines positions. Company I led the attack on Sierra and found that the PAVN were dug in, in well-prepared bunkers, the LZ was secured by the afternoon for the loss of 10 Marines and 23 PAVN killed. On 14 March the PAVN shot down a CH-46D BuNo 154841 of HMM-161 with a B-40 rocket as it conducted a resupply and medevac mission, killing 12 Marines and one Navy corpsman and the PAVN then launched a counterattack on the LZ which was beaten back.

On 10 August 1969 the PAVN 9th Regiment attacked a 2nd Battalion 3rd Marines night defensive position near LZ Sierra resulting in 13 Marines and an estimated 17 PAVN killed.

== Current use ==
The base has reverted to jungle.
