= Edward J. Miller (USMC) =

United States Marine Corps general

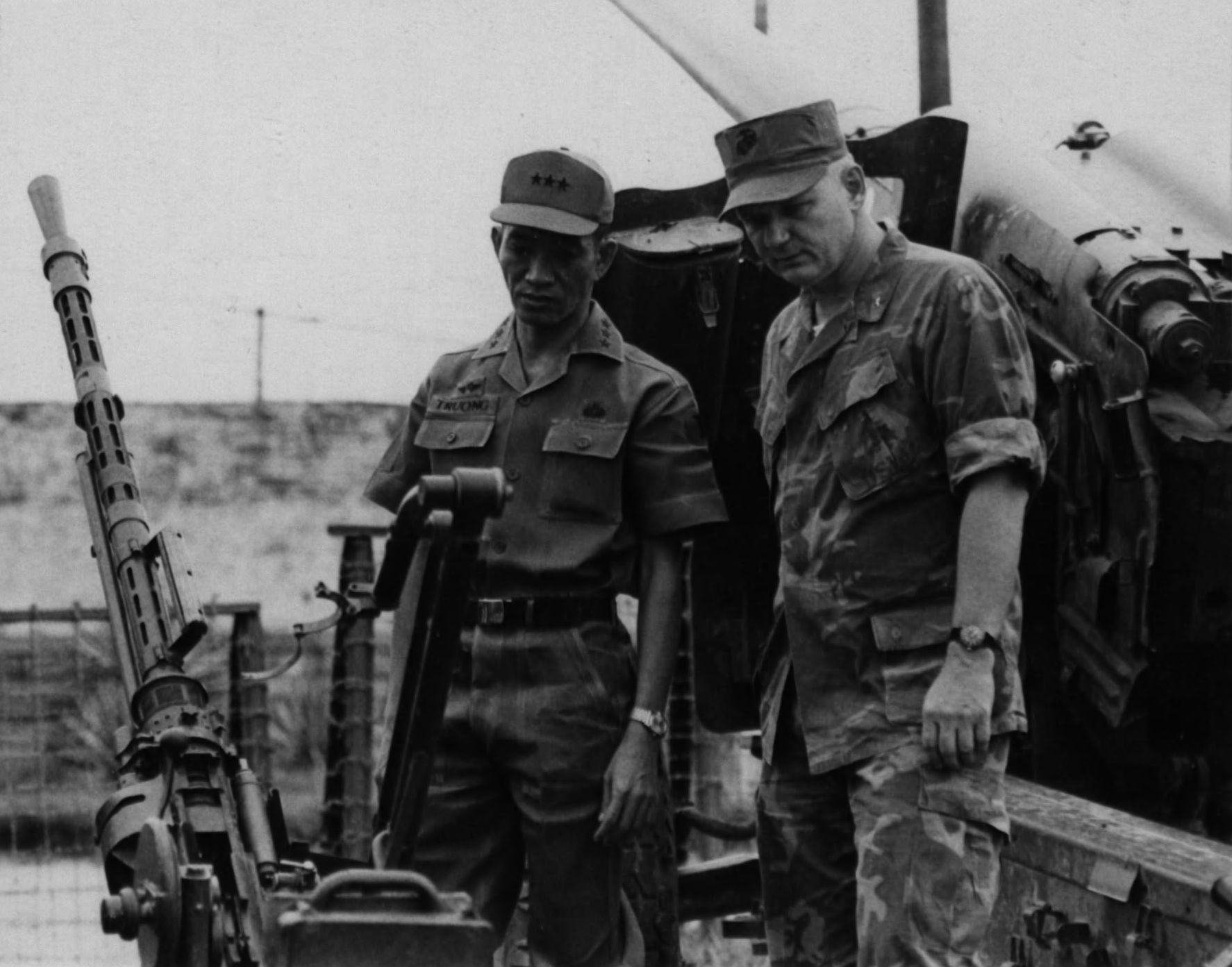
- BG Miller and Lt. Gen. Ngô Quang Trưởng examine captured weapons, 8 September 1972
- Born: 28 August 1922
- Died: 5 June 1993 (aged 70)
- Burial place: Arlington National Cemetery
- Military career
- Branch: United States Marine Corps
- Service years: 1942–1980
- Rank: Lieutenant general
- Nickname: E.J.
- Commands: FMFLANT; 4th Marine Division; 9th Marine Amphibious Brigade; 4th Marine Regiment
- Conflicts: World War II; Korean War; Vietnam War
- Awards: Navy Distinguished Service Medal; Legion of Merit; Silver Star

Lieutenant General Edward J. Miller (28 August 1922 – 5 June 1993) was a United States Marines Corps officer who served in World War II, the Korean War and the Vietnam War.

== Early life ==
He attended St. Thomas Military Academy in St Paul, Minnesota.

== Military career ==
As a First lieutenant commanding a platoon of Company B, 1st Battalion, 26th Marines, 5th Marine Division he was awarded the Silver Star for his actions on 22 February 1945 during the Battle of Iwo Jima.

From 23 September 1967 to 24 February 1968 he served as the intelligence officer (G-2) at the 3rd Marine Division headquarters in South Vietnam. From 25 February to 14 September 1968 he commanded the 4th Marine Regiment, during this time his regiment was primarily engaged in Operation Kentucky and Operation Lancaster II.

In early 1972 he was the assistant commander of the 3rd Marine Division. From 3 April 1972 he commanded the 9th Marine Amphibious Brigade (9th MAB) when it deployed offshore of South Vietnam to assist in the defence of I Corps during the Easter Offensive. In late June the 9th MAB conducted a feint a feint amphibious assault against the mouth of the Cua Viet River as a diversion for the South Vietnamese Operation Lam Son 72. He relinquished command of the 9th MAB on 15 November 1972.

On 1 July 1975 he assumed command of the 4th Marine Division and remained in command until 16 June 1978. In April 1977 he oversaw the relocation of the division from Camp Pendleton to New Orleans, Louisiana.

On 28 June 1978 he assumed his final command as Commanding General, Fleet Marine Force, Atlantic. He retired from the Marines on 1 October 1980.

== Later life ==
He died on 5 June 1993 and was buried at Arlington National Cemetery.

== Decorations ==
His decorations included the Navy Distinguished Service Medal, Legion of Merit and Silver Star.
