= Landing Zone Margo =

Site information
- Type: Marines

Location
- Coordinates: 16.827°N 106.78°E

Site history
- Built: 1968
- In use: 1968-9
- Battles/wars: Vietnam War

Garrison information
- Occupants: 3rd Marine Division

Landing Zone Margo was a U.S. Marine Corps base located northwest of The Rockpile, Quảng Trị Province in central Vietnam.

== History ==
The base was located on Mutter's Ridge northwest of The Rockpile.

The base was first established by the 3rd Battalion 3rd Marines when it was landed here on 27 July 1968 during Operation Lancaster II. On 13 September 3/3 Marines was replaced by BLT 2nd Battalion, 26th Marines which sent out rifle companies north of Margo. On 16 September the 2/26 Marines was ordered to prepare for airlift from Margo and the rifle companies were ordered back to the landing zone. That afternoon the command post at Margo was hit by over 150 rounds of mortar fire resulting in 21 U.S killed and 135 wounded. Two hours later a further mortar attack resulted in one U.S. killed and 11 wounded and the following day another mortar attack resulted in one U.S. killed and 16 wounded.

== Current use ==
The base has reverted to jungle.
