= Operation Lancaster =

Part of the Vietnam War (1967–1968)

- Part of the Vietnam War
- A Marine barters with Vietnamese civilians during Operation Lancaster
Date	1 November 1967 – 20 January 1968
Location	Quảng Trị Province, South Vietnam 16.579°N 106.753°E
Result	U.S. claims victory

Belligerents
United States	North Vietnam

Commanders and leaders
COL Joseph Lo Prete	

Units involved
3rd Marine Regiment	

Casualties and losses
22 killed	US body count: 46 killed

Operation Lancaster was a U.S. Marine Corps operation that took place in northern Quảng Trị Province, South Vietnam from November 1967 to 20 January 1968.

== Background ==
In November 1967, the Kingfisher Tactical Area of Operations (TAOR) was split in two creating the Lancaster TAOR and the Kentucky TAOR. The new Lancaster TAOR bordered the Vietnamese Demilitarized Zone (DMZ) to the north, the Scotland TAOR to the west and the Kentucky and Operationa Osceola to the east and contained the Marines bases of Camp Carroll, The Rockpile and Ca Lu Combat Base and was under the control of COL Joseph Lo Prete's 3rd Marine Regiment. Despite the closure of Route 9 by the People's Army of Vietnam (PAVN) west of Ca Lu, it remained the obvious route for any attempt to relieve the Khe Sanh Combat Base. The terrain in the Lancaster TAOR consisted of rolling hills climbing up to jungle-covered mountains.

== Operation ==
The Marines task was to prevent PAVN infiltration from across the DMZ and from the west and to provide artillery and logistical support to the Marines at Khe Sanh.

== Aftermath ==
Operation Lancaster concluded on 20 January 1968, PAVN losses were 46 killed for the loss of 22 Marines killed and 140 wounded. The operation was immediately continued as Operation Lancaster II in the same tactical area of operations.
