= Operation Purple Martin =

Part of the Vietnam War (1969)

- Part of the Vietnam War
Date	1 March – 8 May 1969
Location	Quảng Trị Province, South Vietnam 16.85°N 106.84°E
Result	US claims operational success

Belligerents
United States	North Vietnam

Commanders and leaders
BG Frank E. Garretson; BG Robert B. Carney Jr. COL William F Goggin	Unknown

Units involved
4th Marine Regiment	246th Regiment

Casualties and losses
~100 killed	US body count: 347 killed

Operation Purple Martin was a US Marine Corps operation that took place in northwest Quảng Trị Province, lasting from 1 March – 2 May 1969.

== Background ==
Since early February 1969, U.S. reconnaissance detected that 3 People's Army of Vietnam (PAVN) Regiments, the 27th, 138th and 246th were moving south from the Vietnamese Demilitarized Zone (DMZ). The 4th Marine Regiment based at Vandegrift Combat Base was given the mission of forcing the 246th Regiment back into the DMZ, occupying key terrain along the southern boundary of the DMZ and then patrolling inside the southern half of the DMZ.

== Operation ==
The operation began on 1 March 1969 with the 3rd Battalion, 4th Marines sweeping north of Firebase Russell, the 2nd Battalion, 4th Marines moving north of Firebase Neville and the 1st Battalion, 4th Marines clearing the area north of Elliot Combat Base. On 2 March 1969 as the 1/4 Marines moved to reopen Landing Zone Mack they were hit by PAVN mortar fire but seized the summit of Mack by mid-morning, however the Marines were then hit by mortar fire causing numerous casualties and forcing them from the summit. With bad weather limiting air support the Marines dug in and were subjected to small arms and mortar fire. On the afternoon of 5 March following an artillery barrage the Marines assaulted the summit of Mack clearing numerous PAVN bunkers.

On 9 March Company G 2/4 Marines moved to reopen Landing Zone Catapult 4 km north of Firebase Neville overlooking the Cam Lộ valley. The PAVN defended the former Landing Zone and were only slowly dislodged from their positions, due to bad weather air support was unavailable to the Marines who had to rely exclusively on artillery support. By 10 March the Marines penetrated the PAVN defenses and engaged in a daylong battle with the defenders. On 11 March the PAVN counterattacked the Marine positions and 4 Marines were killed of which 3 were killed by friendly fire. When the Marines finally secured the area they found 24 PAVN dead.

On 13 March the Marines moved along the ridgeline from Landing Zone Mack to retake Landing Zone Sierra which had been abandoned 2 months earlier and was now used by the PAVN to mortar Marine positions. Company I led the attack on Sierra and found that the PAVN were dug into well-prepared bunkers, the landing zone was secured by the afternoon for the loss of 10 Marines and 23 PAVN killed. On 14 March the PAVN shot down a CH-46D 'Sea Knight' helicopter of HMM-161 with a B40 rocket grenade as it conducted a resupply and medical evacuation mission, killing 12 Marines and 1 Navy corpsman and the PAVN then launched a counterattack on the LZ which was beaten back.

On 20 March 1969 the Marines moved to reoccupy Firebase Argonne. As the US Army UH-1E 'Huey' helicopter carrying team Frostburg from the 3rd Reconnaissance Battalion approached the hill it was met with heavy fire killing the pilot and wounding the copilot, who crash-landed onto the hill. Shortly after crashing the PAVN assaulted the survivors but were repulsed and the team was extracted. Company D 1/4 Marines was landed nearby and moved to secure Argonne fighting against PAVN entrenched in bunkers resulting in 6 Marines and 15 PAVN killed. The following morning a PAVN mortar attack hit the Marine command post killing the battalion commander LTC George Sargent and three other Marines, further mortar fire hit as the wounded were being evacuated resulting in a further 3 Marines killed. Company C was then ordered to move to Argonne while Company A swept west of the base to silence the PAVN mortars. On 28 March Company A seized Hill 1154 northwest of Argonne destroying the PAVN mortar positions. Operations around Argonne continued into April.

On 25 March with the chain of landing zones and firebases in their possession, the 3/5 Marines began reconnaissance into the DMZ. The Marines deployed small 14 man patrols which if engaged could call on rapid reinforcement from "Sparrowhawk" teams, however the patrols encountered only limited PAVN activity.

On 10 April Company E 2/5 Marines assaulted a PAVN bunker and cave complex in the Cam Lộ valley capturing several prisoners and stocks of weapons and ammunition. By 25 April the Marines began to move south from the DMZ.

== Aftermath ==
Operation Purple Martin concluded on 8 May, the PAVN 246th Regiment had been pushed back with alleged losses of over 347 killed, while Marine losses were approximately 100 killed.
