= Firebase Argonne =

Fire support base in Vietnam

Site information
- Type: Marines

Location
- Coordinates: 16.795°N 106.568°E

Site history
- Built: 1968
- In use: 1968-9
- Battles/wars: Vietnam War

Garrison information
- Occupants: 4th Marine Regiment

Firebase Argonne (also known as Hill 1308) was a U.S. Marine Corps firebase located northwest of Khe Sanh, Quảng Trị Province in central Vietnam.

== History ==
The base was built from 4–11 November 1968 by the 2nd Battalion 4th Marines approximately 10 km northwest of Khe Sanh and 2 km east of the Laotian border. The base provided excellent views of the People's Army of Vietnam (PAVN) transport network in Laos, but the Marines were unable to call fire missions due to U.S. Government policy. The base was abandoned by the Marines on 14 December 1968.

PFC Robert H. Jenkins, Jr. part of a 12-man team from the 3rd Reconnaissance Battalion would be posthumously awarded the Medal of Honor for his actions at Argonne on 5 March 1969.

On 20 March 1969 as part of Operation Purple Martin the Marines moved to reoccupy Firebase Argonne. As the Army UH-1E helicopter (#68-15340) carrying team "Frostburg" from the 3rd Reconnaissance Battalion approached the hill it was met with heavy fire killing the pilot and wounding the copilot, who crash-landed onto the hill. Shortly after crashing the PAVN assaulted the survivors but were repulsed and the team was extracted. Company D from the 1st Battalion 4th Marines was landed nearby and moved to secure Argonne fighting against PAVN entrenched in bunkers resulting in six U.S. and 15 PAVN killed. The following morning a PAVN mortar attack hit the Marine command post killing the Battalion commander LTC George Sargent and three other Marines, further mortar fire hit as the wounded were being evacuated resulting in a further three Marines killed. Company C was then ordered to move to Argonne while Company A swept west of the base to silence the PAVN mortars. On 28 March Company A seized Hill 1154 northwest of Argonne destroying the PAVN mortar positions. Operations around Argonne continued into April.

The location of the fictional Firebase Matterhorn in Matterhorn: A Novel of the Vietnam War corresponds to Firebase Argonne, although the events described in the novel correspond to events at Landing Zone Mack where the author Karl Marlantes fought.

== Current use ==
The base has reverted to jungle.
