= Landing Zone Mack =

Site information
- Type: Marines

Location
- Coordinates: 16.832°N 106.844°E

Site history
- Built: 1968
- In use: 1968-9
- Battles/wars: Vietnam War

Garrison information
- Occupants: 3rd Marine Division

Landing Zone Mack (also known as Hill 484) was a U.S. Marine Corps base located northwest of Cam Lộ, Quảng Trị Province in central Vietnam.

== History ==
The base was located on Mutter's Ridge north of The Rockpile, approximately 16 km northwest of Cam Lo.

Hill 484 was the scene of heavy fighting between the 3rd Battalion, 4th Marines and People's Army of Vietnam (PAVN) forces during Operation Prairie in early October 1966. It was captured by the Marines but then abandoned after the battle.

The base was established by the 3rd Marines during Operation Lancaster II when it was dropped here on 13 August 1968 to head off the PAVN 64th Regiment which was believed to be moving into the area. The Marines were unable to locate the PAVN and Mack was abandoned on 15 August. On 21 November elements of 3rd Battalion 12th Marines were deployed to Mack and in early December 3/12 Marines conducted sweeps north of Mack.

On 2 March 1969 the 1st Battalion 4th Marines began Operation Purple Martin north of the Rockpile to reopen Mack and engage the PAVN 246th Regiment which was believed to be located in the area. Despite early morning PAVN mortar fire 1/4 Marines seized the summit of Mack by mid-morning, however the Marines were then hit by mortar fire causing numerous casualties and forcing them from the summit. With bad weather limiting air support the Marines dug in and were subjected to small arms and mortar fire. On the afternoon of 5 March following an artillery barrage the Marines assaulted the summit of Mack clearing numerous PAVN bunkers.

The actions at Mack in 1969 correspond to those at the fictional Firebase Matterhorn in Matterhorn: A Novel of the Vietnam War where the author Karl Marlantes fought.
