= Robert H. Jenkins Jr. =

United States Marine Corps Medal of Honor recipient

Robert Henry Jenkins Jr.
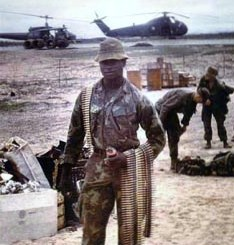
- Robert H. Jenkins
- Born: June 1, 1948; Interlachen, Florida, U.S.
- Died: March 5, 1969 (aged 20); Quảng Trị province, South Vietnam
- Burial place: Sister Spring Baptist Cemetery Interlachen, Florida
- Military career
- Allegiance: United States of America
- Branch: United States Marine Corps
- Service years: 1968–1969
- Rank: Private First Class
- Unit: 3rd Reconnaissance Battalion
- Conflicts: Vietnam War †
- Awards: Medal of Honor; Purple Heart; Combat Action Ribbon

Robert Henry Jenkins Jr. (June 1, 1948 – March 5, 1969) was a United States Marine who was awarded the Medal of Honor posthumously for his heroic actions above and beyond the call of duty in March 1969 during the Vietnam War.

== Biography ==
Robert Henry Jenkins Jr. was born on June 1, 1948, in Interlachen, Florida. He attended Oak Grove Elementary School from 1955 until 1963, and Central Academy High School from 1963 until 1967 in Palatka, Florida.

Jenkins enlisted in the United States Marine Corps in Jacksonville, Florida on February 2, 1968, and received recruit training with the 2nd Recruit Training Battalion, Recruit Training Regiment, Marine Corps Recruit Depot Parris Island, South Carolina. He was promoted to private first class on April 1, 1968.

Jenkins transferred to the Marine Corps Base, Camp Lejeune, North Carolina, where he underwent individual combat training with the 2nd Infantry Training Battalion, 1st Infantry Training Regiment, and infantry special training with the 1st Infantry Training Battalion, completing the latter in May 1968.

PFC Jenkins was transferred to the Republic of Vietnam in July 1968, and assigned to Headquarters and Service Company, 3rd Reconnaissance Battalion, 3rd Marine Division. Later that month, he was reassigned as a scout and driver with Company C, 3rd Reconnaissance Battalion.

While serving as a machine gunner with Company C at Fire Support Base Argonne, south of the Demilitarized Zone on March 5, 1969, he was killed in action. He was, along with his 12-man recon team, attacked by enemy fire – mortars, machine guns, and grenades. Jenkins and fellow Marine, Fred Ostrom, took up position in a two-man fighting emplacement. When a hand grenade was thrown into the emplacement, Jenkins leaped on top of Ostrom, shielding him from the explosion and absorbing the full impact of the grenade. He was mortally wounded and posthumously awarded the Medal of Honor for his heroic act and sacrifice of life.

The Medal of Honor was presented to his family at the White House by Vice President Spiro T. Agnew on April 20, 1970.

Jenkins is buried at Sister Spring Baptist Cemetery in Interlachen, Florida.

== Military awards ==
Jenkins' military decorations and awards include:

Medal of Honor	Purple Heart	Combat Action Ribbon
National Defense Service Medal	Vietnam Service Medal w/ three 3/16" bronze stars	Republic of Vietnam Campaign Medal w/ 1960– device

== Medal of Honor citation ==
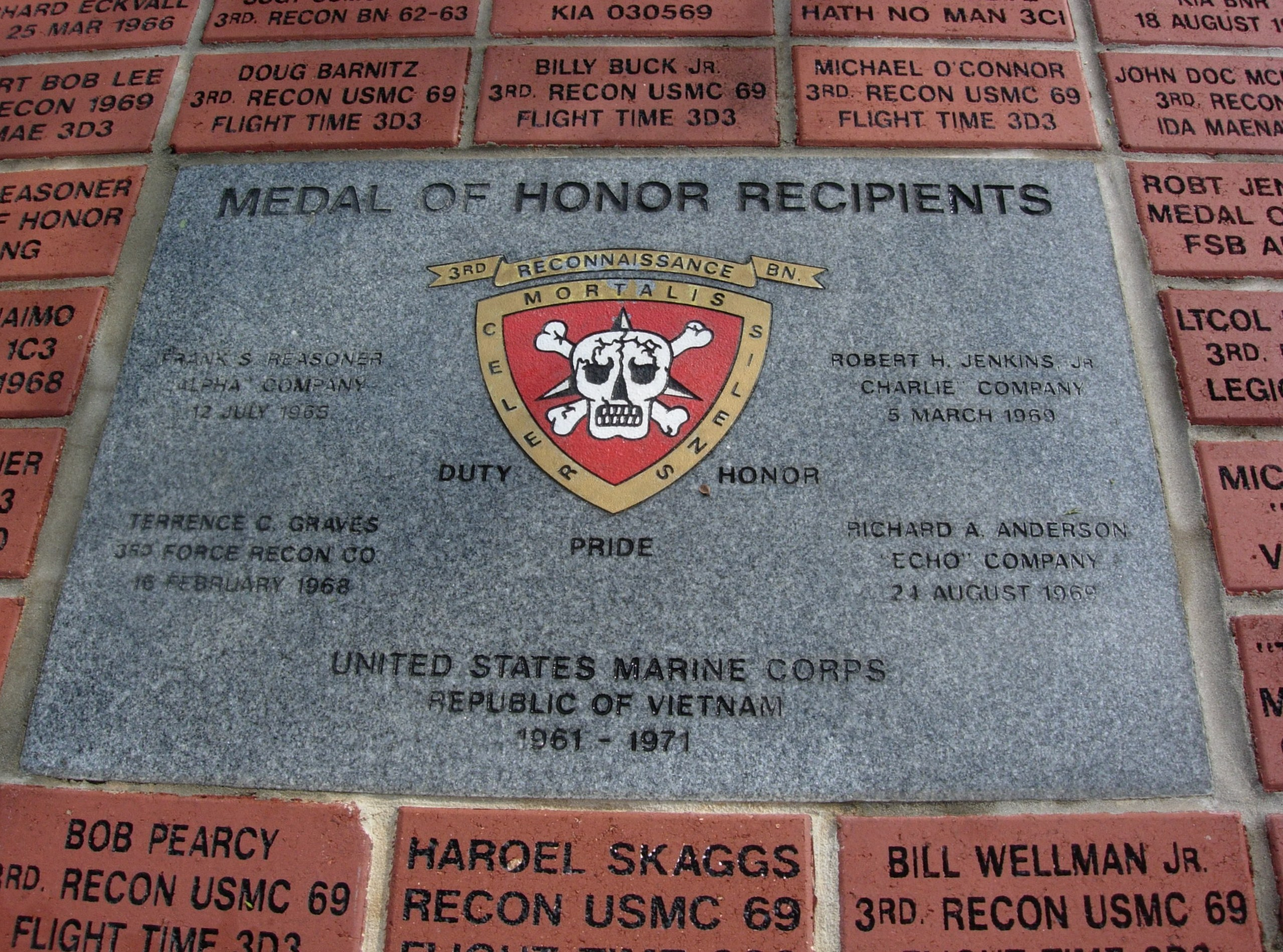
3rd Reconnaissance Medal of Honor Monument Ocala, Florida Memorial Park

The President of the United States in the name of United States Congress takes pride in presenting the MEDAL OF HONOR posthumously to

PRIVATE FIRST CLASS ROBERT H. JENKINS JR.
UNITED STATES MARINE CORPS

for service as set forth in the following

CITATION:

"For conspicuous gallantry and intrepidity at the risk of his life above and beyond the call of duty while serving as a Marine Gunner with Company C, Third Reconnaissance Battalion, Third Marine Division in connection with operations against enemy forces in the Republic of Vietnam. Early on the morning of 5 March 1969, Private First Class Jenkins' twelve-man reconnaissance team was occupying a defensive position at Fire Support Base Argonne south of the Vietnamese Demilitarized Zone. Suddenly, the Marines were assaulted by a North Vietnamese Army platoon employing mortar, automatic weapons, and hand grenades.

Reacting instantly, Private First Class Jenkins and another Marine quickly moved into a two-man fighting emplacement, and as they boldly delivered accurate machine gun fire against the enemy, a North Vietnamese soldier threw a hand grenade into the friendly emplacement.

Fully realizing the inevitable results of his action, Private First Class Jenkins quickly seized his comrade, and pushing the man to the ground, he leaped on top of the Marine to shield him from the explosion. Absorbing the full impact of the detonation, Private First Class Jenkins was seriously injured and subsequently succumbed to his wounds. His courage, inspiring valor and selfless devotion to duty saved a fellow Marine from serious injury or possible death and upheld the highest traditions of the Marine Corps and the United States Navy. He gallantly gave his life for his country."

/S/ Richard M. Nixon

== See also ==
- List of Medal of Honor recipients
- List of Medal of Honor recipients for the Vietnam War
- List of African-American Medal of Honor recipients
