= Operation Kentucky =

Part of the Vietnam War (1967–1969)

- Part of Vietnam War
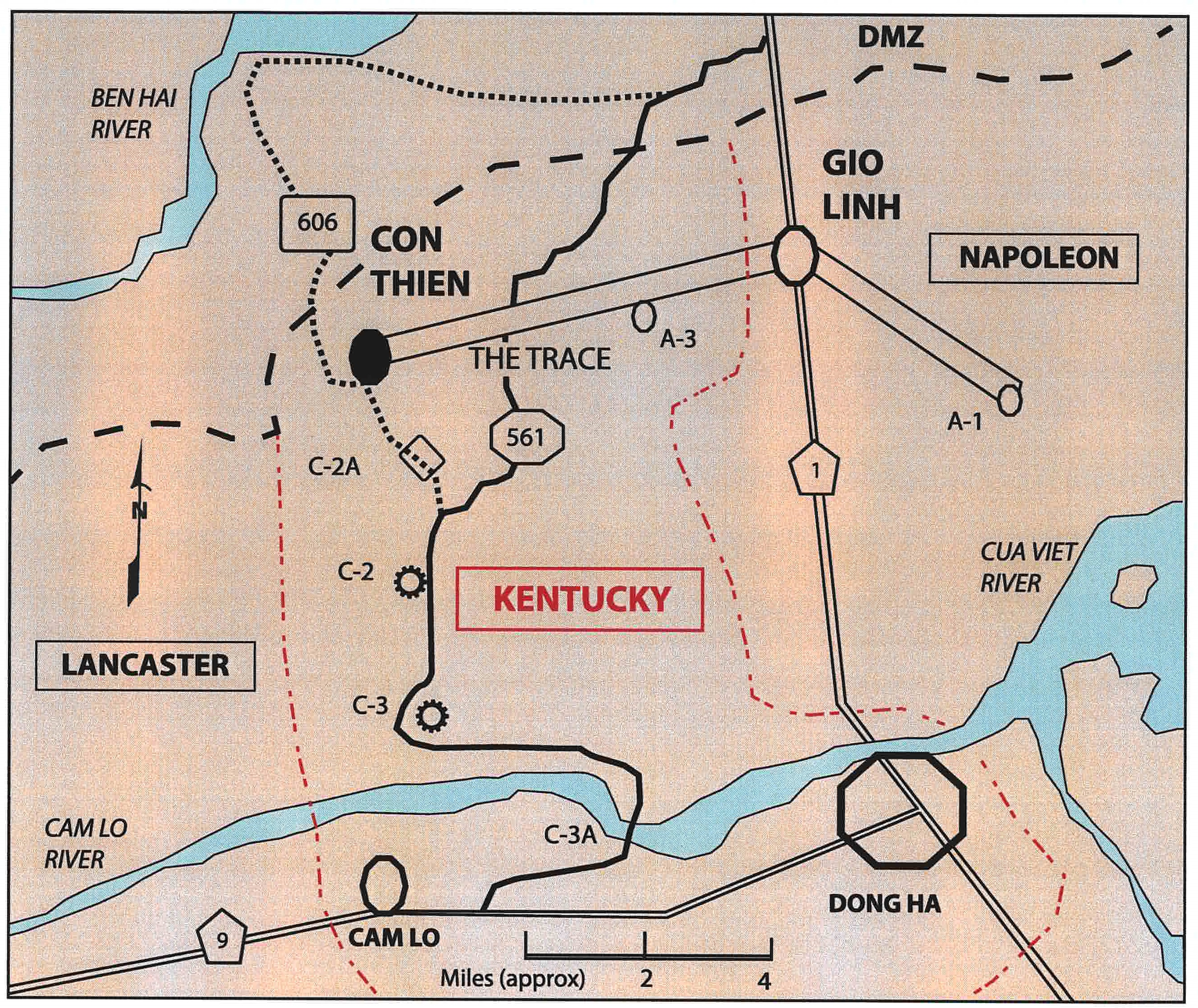
- Kentucky, Napoleon and Lancaster areas of operation
| Date | November 1, 1967 – February 28, 1969 |
| Location | Con Thien, Quảng Trị Province, South Vietnam |

Belligerents
| United States; South Vietnam | North Vietnam |

Commanders and leaders
| Robert E. Cushman, Jr. Col Richard B. Smith | |

Units involved
| 2nd Battalion, 1st Marines; 3rd Battalion, 3rd Marines; 1st Battalion, 4th Marines; 2nd Battalion, 4th Marines; 3rd Battalion, 4th Marines; 2nd Battalion, 9th Marines; 2nd Battalion, 12th Marines (South Vietnam) 1st Division | 320th Division; 803rd Regiment, 324B Division |

Casualties and losses
| (United States) 520 killed | 3,839 killed 117 captured |

Operation Kentucky was a multi-battalion operation conducted by the United States Marine Corps in the area south of the DMZ in Quảng Trị Province. This was another operation to secure the Con Thien area from the People's Army of Vietnam (PAVN). The operation ran from 1 November 1967 until 28 February 1969.

== Prelude ==
Following the conclusion of Operation Kingfisher, 3rd Marine Division split the Kingfisher tactical area of responsibility (TAOR) in two. The new Kentucky TAOR which included Firebase Gio Linh, Con Thien, Cam Lộ Combat Base and Đông Hà Combat Base (the area known to Marines as Leatherneck Square) was under the control of the 9th Marines, while to the west the Operation Lancaster TAOR covered Camp Carroll, The Rockpile and Ca Lu Combat Base was under the control of 3rd Marines.

== November 1967 ==
On November 9 the Marines continued construction of the strongpoint obstacle system and engaged platoon and company-sized PAVN units, often in bunkers trying to ambush the Marines and hinder construction. The Marines killed 65 PAVN during these encounters. On 29 November 3 Marine Battalions and 2 Battalions from the Army of the Republic of Vietnam (ARVN) 1st Division conducted a clearing operation between Con Thien and Gio Linh. On 30 November 2/9 Marines found and overran a PAVN bunker system killing 41 PAVN for the loss of 15 Marines killed and 53 wounded.

== December 1967 ==
This period saw relatively little PAVN activity other than harassment fire on the Con Thien base and the Marines used this relative quiet to continue to improve the strongpoints along the Trace line. On 31 December, Company I of 3/4 Marines on a patrol north from Strongpoint A-3 spotted PAVN soldiers in the southern DMZ, engaging the PAVN they soon realised that the PAVN occupied a line of bunkers in front of them. Marine mortars and artillery and two UH-1E Huey gunships from VMO-6 provided supporting fire and Company I was able to withdraw sustaining only 4 wounded, while the PAVN had lost at least 35 dead.

== January 1968 ==
On the morning of 7 January while attempting to neutralise a PAVN sniper, two fire teams from Company L 3/4 Marines were ambushed. The remainder of Company L and Company K were sent in to help the fire teams break contact and were drawn into a daylong battle. By the end of the day the Marines had lost 6 killed, 36 wounded and 1 missing.

On 11 January a 3-Company operation was mounted to recover the body of the Marine missing in the 7 January operation, the PAVN had dragged the body into the DMZ and were using it as bait to trap US forces. The Marines supported by artillery and air strikes outflanked the PAVN positions, destroyed 25 bunkers and killed 15 PAVN for the loss of 2 Marines wounded.

On 18 January Company L 3/4 Marines launched a patrol 3.2 km northeast of Con Thien into an area nicknamed the Meat Market by Marines. The patrol was ambushed by PAVN in well-camouflaged bunkers and the lead squad was cut off from the rest of the Company and was used by the PAVN as bait for the other Marines. Under the cover of Marine gunships and artillery fire, the survivors and dead of the isolated squad were brought back into the Company perimeter. Company M then moved forward to relieve Company L and the combined force overran several PAVN bunkers. Marine losses were 9 dead and 22 wounded, while the PAVN were estimated to have suffered 100 casualties.

Due to the uncertainty of PAVN intentions in the DMZ, on 20 January COMUSMACV, General Westmoreland agreed to a request from III Marine Amphibious Force (III MAF) to suspend construction on the strongpoint obstacle system.

== February 1968 ==
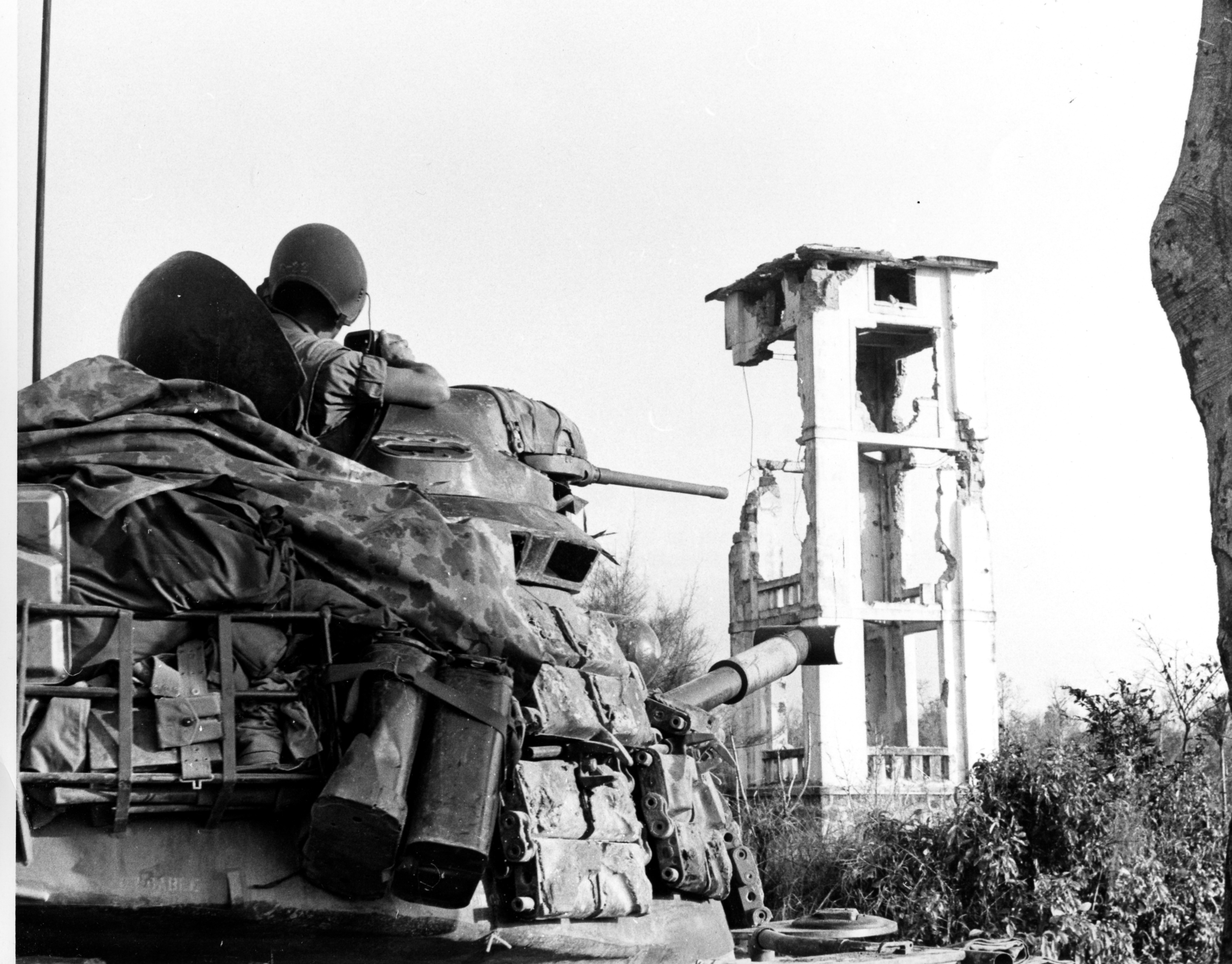
Crewman of 3rd Tank Battalion keeps watch for PAVN snipers east of Con Thien

At 02:15 on 2 February the PAVN attacked the Combined Action Company P headquarters at Cam Lộ. The Marines, supported by a detachment of US Army M42 Dusters held off the PAVN attack until relieved by a quick reaction force from 2/9 Marines. The PAVN lost 111 killed and 23 captured while the Marines lost 2 dead and 18 wounded and the US Army lost 1 killed.

On 7 February the PAVN ambushed a patrol by a platoon from Company K 3/3 Marines south of Con Thien, killing 9 Marines including the Platoon Commander. The remainder of Company K moved to reinforce the ambushed platoon and were themselves ambushed from well-concealed PAVN bunkers, suffering 18 killed and 10 wounded in the first 5 minutes, including the Platoon commanders and their radio operators. At the 3/3 Marines operations center at Strongpoint A-3 the Battalion Commander ordered Company L to establish blocking positions while Company M manoeuvred to relieve Company K. Company M was unable to reach the ambush site before dark and Company L returned to Strongpoint A-3, while Companies K and M dug in for the night. On the morning of 8 February the two Companies, supported by tanks, artillery and gunships, attacked the PAVN bunker complex, killing 139 PAVN, while suffering a further 3 Marines killed.

Following their defeat in the Tet Offensive there was a marked decline in PAVN activity along the DMZ apart from ongoing artillery, rocket and mortar fire.

== March 1968 ==
The PAVN continued to pressure the Marines particularly around the A-3 strongpoint between Con Thien and Gio Linh. On 3 March Company L, 3rd Battalion, 3rd Marines, occupying an outpost on Hill 28 just north of the A-3, intercepted a PAVN battalion attempting to infiltrate the Marine positions. The PAVN encircled the Marines and were only driven back by airstrikes and Huey gunship runs. One Marine was killed and thirteen wounded while killing over 100 PAVN.

On 16 March, Company M, 3/3 Marines and Company C, 1/4 Marines clashed with another battalion-sized PAVN force. The two Marine companies called in artillery and air upon the PAVN, the bulk of which disengaged, leaving a company behind to fight a rearguard action. PAVN artillery from north of the DMZ answered the American supporting arms with a 400-round barrage of its own on the Marines. Marine casualties were two killed and nine wounded for 83 NVA killed. For the entire month in Operation Kentucky, 9th Marines reported over 400 enemy dead while Marine casualties were 37 killed and more than 200 wounded.

== April–May 1968 ==
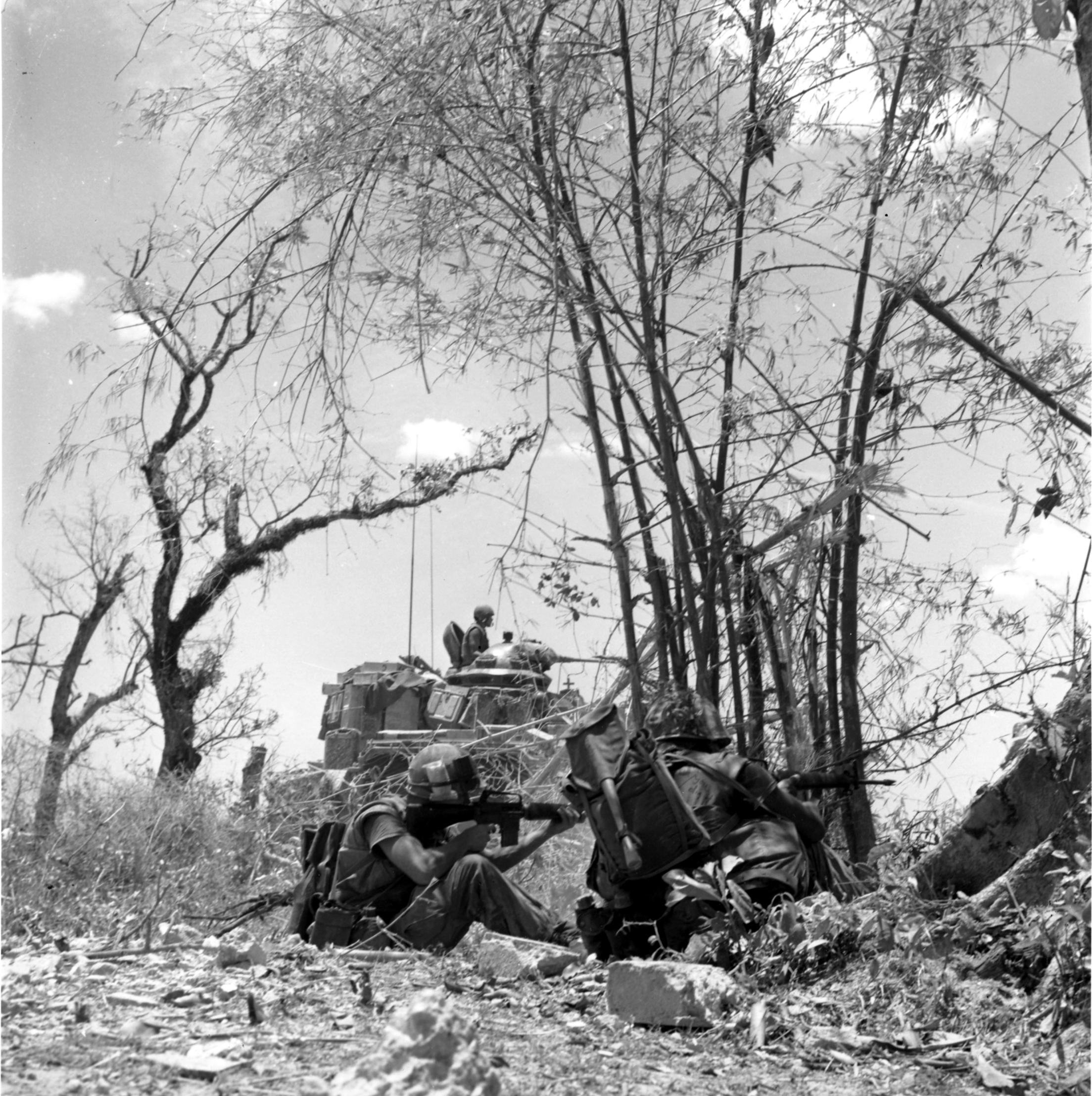
9th Marines supported by a tank engage a PAVN position north of Dong Ha

On 22 May a patrol from Company A 1/4 Marines ran into a PAVN force east of Con Thien. 1/4 attacked east from Con Thien, while 3/3 Marines attacked west from Strongpoint A-3. 3/9 Marines were helicoptered into blocking positions in the south, while 1/9 Marines was helicoptered into blocking positions in the north. The PAVN tried to escape across the trace line but were mowed down by artillery, tank, gunship and fixed-wing fire. The PAVN suffered 225 killed, while the Marines had 23 killed and 75 wounded.

== June–July 1968 ==
On 6 June, a reinforced platoon from Company E, 26th Marines observed and then engaged a PAVN company while on patrol 1.8 km southeast of Con Thien. Reinforced by the command group and a rifle platoon from Company H, the patrol engaged the PAVN with small arms and 81mm mortars. 14 PAVN were killed and the Marines suffered 14 killed and 11 wounded.

On 7 July, to exploit the results of Operation Thor in the Cửa Việt-Dong Ha sector, the 9th Marines began a sweep of the area between Con Thien and the DMZ. On 11 July, 4 km northeast of Con Thien, elements of 3/9 Marines discovered a reinforced PAVN platoon in the open. Fixing the PAVN in place with small arms fire, the Marines, with air, artillery, and tank support, launched a coordinated air-ground attack through the area killing more than 30 PAVN. The 9th Marines uncovered and destroyed numerous PAVN fortifications, a few of the positions were lightly defended, but the majority were abandoned. One bunker system discovered 4 km meters due north of Con Thien spanned more than 1 km and included 242 well-constructed bunkers. Supplies and equipment abandoned included weapons, 935 mortar rounds, 500 pounds of explosives, 55 antitank mines, and 500 pounds of rice. The Marines also found 29 bodies, killed by artillery and airstrikes during the advance on the complex.

On 21 July 2/9 Marines discovered a major PAVN bunker complex 6 km southwest of Con Thien. Composed of 60 A-frame timbered bunkers built into the sides of bomb craters, each with an average overhead cover 10-feet-thick, the system was connected to a large command bunker by a network of interconnecting tunnels. The command bunker featured an aperture overlooking Con Thien and C-2 and documents found in the bunker indicated that the PAVN had been observing and reporting the movement of helicopters, tanks, and trucks entering and leaving Con Thien and C-2.

== August 1968 ==
Early August saw little contact with the PAVN other than an encounter by Company F, 9th Marines with 30 PAVN, 3 km east of Con Thien. In the face of artillery and fixed-wing support, the PAVN broke contact and the Marines began a sweep through the area during which they regained contact. The PAVN again broke and ran, and Company F moved through the area, capturing a number of weapons and counting 11 dead.

On 15 August, a PAVN company attacked a four-man Marine reconnaissance team southeast of Con Thien near the abandoned airstrip at Nam Đông. The patrol returned fire and requested reinforcement, while simultaneously calling in preplanned artillery fires. Within minutes a platoon from Company A, 1st Marines, accompanied by three tanks, moved out of positions 1 km away and headed south to assist. The coordinated attack, which included more than 150 rounds of 105mm artillery, 40 rounds of 4.2-inch mortar, 75 rounds from the 90mm guns of the tanks, and airstrikes by Marine UH-1E gunships accounted for several PAVN dead.

As PAVN activity continued to increase in the eastern DMZ, particularly north of Con Thien, the Marines decided to act. In addition to sightings of enemy tanks, Marine fighter pilots and aerial observers reported spotting trucks, truck parks, camouflaged revetments, storage bunkers, and trenchlines. Of special interest were repeated sightings of low, slow moving lights during hours of darkness which, it was assumed, came from enemy helicopters thought to be resupplying forward positions with high priority cargo such as ammunition and medical supplies or conducting medevacs. On 19 August, after 60 Arclight strikes 2nd Battalion, 1st Marines assaulted into three landing zones in the Trung Son region of the southern DMZ, 5 km north of Con Thien. Supported by a platoon of tanks from 3rd Tank Battalion, 2/1 Marines swept the area but found no evidence of use by VPAF helicopters. During the extraction one CH-46 Sea Knight was destroyed by a command detonated mine, killing 4 Marines.

While the assault claimed no PAVN casualties, it did scatter PAVN forces in the area. On the morning of the 19th, Bravo Company, 2/1 and the Army's Company A, 77th Armored Regiment engaged an enemy platoon while supported by M-48s from 3rd Tank Battalion, killing 26 PAVN. 6 km southwest of Con Thien Mike Company, 3/9 Marines intercepted a reinforced PAVN platoon, under the cover of airstrikes and artillery they kill 30 NVA and captured 2. On 20 August, 2 PAVN squads attacked Companies G and H, 2/9 Marines with small arms, RPGs, mortars, and artillery. The Marines, supported by 5 M-48s from 3rd Tank Battalion forced the PAVN to withdraw northward, leaving their dead. On 21 August, Company I, 9th Marines began receiving sniper fire and within an hour, the company had engaged a PAVN unit of undetermined size, firing small arms and grenades, responding with accurate rocket, mortar, and artillery fire, the Marines forced the PAVN to break contact and withdraw to the north. A search of the area found 14 PAVN dead and 12 weapons.

On 24 August at 17:00, Marine reconnaissance team Tender Rancho was moving 7 km southeast of Con Thien near Dao Xuyen, when it surprised a group of 15 bivouacked PAVN troops killing 6. Within minutes the team received a barrage of 82mm mortars and immediately formed a 360-degree security. 90 minutes later gunships arrived on station and informed the team that the PAVN surrounded them. At 19:30 despite receiving 0.50 caliber and 82mm mortar fire helicopters inserted a reinforced platoon from Company D, 1st Marines to assist. Meanwhile, additional platoons from Company D, along with Company C, moving overland from the east took up blocking positions north of the encircled reconnaissance team before dark. At daylight on 25 August, Marine helicopters inserted the remainder of Company D. During the insertion a CH-34, while dodging enemy fire, struck a tree breaking off the tail section, killing 3 and wounding 14. With the arrival of elements of 1/3 Marines and Company M, 3/9 Marines later in the day, the Marines effectively cordoned the area, preventing a PAVN withdrawal. During the remainder of the 25th and into the 26th, as Companies C and D, 1st Marines pushed southward toward the other blocking forces, the PAVN made several unsuccessful attempts to break the cordon. By the end of 26 August, after three days of fighting, the PAVN had suffered 78 killed while the Marines suffered 11 killed and 58 wounded.

On 31 August 1st Marines was relieved of responsibility for the Kentucky area of operations by the Army's 1st Brigade, 5th Infantry Division (Mechanized).

== September 1968 ==
On 4 September, a platoon from Company A, 61st Infantry was sent to the relief of Company M, 3/9 Marines which was engaged in battle with a reinforced PAVN company in bunkers west of Con Thien. Joined by a reaction force from Company C, 61st Infantry, and supported by artillery and airstrikes, the American units killed more than 20 PAVN for 6 US killed and 55 wounded in the two-and-one-half hour battle that followed.

On 11 September, Company D, 11th Infantry Regiment engaged a PAVN force of unknown strength from the 27th Independent Regiment occupying bunkers near the "Market Place," 4 km northeast of Con Thien. The Company called for air and artillery strikes while a platoon of tanks from the 1st Battalion, 77th Armored moved up reinforce. At 18:30 the PAVN attempted to break contact, but the artillery prevented their withdrawal. One group of PAVN raised a white flag, so the American gunners ceased fire momentarily to allow the group to surrender, instead the PAVN broke and ran and the artillery barrage resumed. A later sweep of the area found 40 dead, 7 were captured.

On 13 September following Arclight and naval and land artillery strikes 3 Brigade task forces from the 5th Infantry Division attacked into the DMZ northeast of Con Thien. To the east the 1st Squadron, 7th ARVN Armored Cavalry, supported by two platoons from Company A, 3rd Tank Battalion, simultaneously attacked to the north and northeast of A-2 and Gio Linh. The ARVN achieved almost immediate contact. The Marine tanks providing a base of fire for the advancing ARVN infantry fired 90mm canister and high-explosive rounds and their machine guns to break through the PAVN defenses killing 73 PAVN. Following in the wake of the tanks, and supported by helicopter gunships, the ARVN infantry killed an additional 68 PAVN and captured one. On the left flank, after encountering mines and antitank fire, the three Army task forces joined the action, accounting for another 35 PAVN and seizing a large cache of mortar rounds. The allied forces reached their northernmost objectives, turned south, and returned to their bases by late afternoon. The captured PAVN soldier identified his unit as an element of the 138th Regiment which had assumed control of the 27th Independent Regiment's area of operations, due to the heavy casualties suffered by the regiment in recent months.

In late September heavy monsoon rains had swollen the Ben Hai River, forcing remnants of the 320th Division and independent regiments north across the river, but military intelligence indicated that some groups had been trapped in the south by the rising water. On 26 September Companies B, C, and D, 11th Infantry moved out from positions at C-2 and C-2 Bridge. In coordination with the ARVN 2nd and 3rd Battalions, 2nd Regiment, and the 3rd Marines, the companies moved to a position west of Con Thien and then attacked north across the southern boundary of the DMZ, toward the Dong Be Lao mountain complex. During an 8-day patrol into the DMZ, they encountered minimal opposition from the PAVN rearguard. Searches of numerous bunkers and other complexes indicated that the PAVN had only recently abandoned the positions.

== October 1968 ==
On 11 October a brigade mechanized infantry and tank force, composed of Companies B and C, 61st Infantry and Company B, 77th Armored, engaged a platoon of PAVN in heavily fortified bunkers, 2.5 km northeast of Con Thien. The PAVN used RPGs and 60mm mortars to knock out 3 M-48s and one M-113. Mines disabled another two M-48s and one M-113, killing 3 and wounding 20. After five hours of battle 26 PAVN were killed.

Despite heavy rain during October, ground and aerial reconnaissance missions indicated the presence of a sizable PAVN force south of the Ben Hai River between Gio Linh and Con Thien. On 23 October the brigade task force, composed of three companies of the dismounted 1st Battalion, 61st Infantry attacked north from A-3 and Con Thien into the DMZ and then eastward along the Ben Hai River toward the ARVN 2nd Regiment and Company H, 9th Marines which had earlier trapped a PAVN force killing 112. As the task force continued eastward during the 24th, through Kinh Mon, Tan Mon, and An Xa along an abandoned railroad, Company A engaged a PAVN platoon, killing seven. At 08:30 on 25 October, Company A encountered a PAVN battalion in well-fortified bunkers, while Company B came under heavy small arms and mortar fire. By 10:30 the engaged companies had linked up, and while Company A attacked to the northeast against the enemy's flank, Company B assaulted and overran the enemy position, capturing one 82mm mortar, two 60mm mortars, and two 0.50-caliber machine guns. Both companies, later reinforced by Company B, 77th Armor, remained in contact until 18:00 killing 231 PAVN for the loss of 4 killed and 24 wounded.

On 22 October COMUSMACV General Abrams, ordered all construction and planning efforts associated with the anti-infiltration effort halted. Under the new plan, referred to as Duel Blade, allied forces, supported by air, artillery, and naval gunfire, would maintain a mobile posture and actively resist infiltration from the North by maintaining a comprehensive surveillance effort. While ground reconnaissance would be a part of the effort, attended and unattended detection devices or sensors would provide a majority of the surveillance capability. As part of the implementation of Duel Blade the "A" and "C" strongpoint sites considered essential would be used as fire support bases, while those of no value, such as A-3 and C-3, would be closed.

== November 1968 ==
With effect from 21:00 on 1 November the US ceased all offensive operations against the territory of North Vietnam. This prohibition also applied to offensive operations north of the DMZ's southern boundary. General Abrams later sought and obtained authority to send squad-size patrols into the southern DMZ to capture prisoners and obtain intelligence on the PAVN military buildup in the DMZ.

On 1 November the 1st Brigade, 5th Infantry Division, was directed to move from the Kentucky area of operations into an area near Quảng Trị. The 3rd Marines supported by the 3rd Tank Battalion assumed control of the Kentucky area. As a sign of the reduced PAVN activity in the Kentucky area, by December only Company E, 2/3 Marines was responsible for the security for Con Thien and C-2 Bridge, as well as patrolling and ambushing throughout its assigned 54-square kilometer area.

== February 1969 ==
On 10 February at 17:45 a U.S. observation aircraft received fire over the DMZ 4 miles (6.4 km) north of Gio Linh and 400m south of the Bến Hải River. The observer directed Marine artillery fire onto the firing location causing five secondary explosions and destroying one bunker. On 13 February at 17:00 an aerial observer received fire 4 miles west of Con Thien and directed artillery fire onto the firing positions causing a secondary explosion and destroying seven bunkers and killing 6 PAVN. On 14 February at 13:45 an aerial observer received fire 4 miles northwest of Gio Linh and directed fire from the USS New Jersey onto the firing location destroying one bunker. On 19 February at 16:30 an aerial observer received fire 4 miles north of Gio Linh and directed Army and Marine artillery fire onto the area causing two secondary explosions and destroying one bunker. On 21 February at 03:15 a U.S. Navy LCM-6 tied up at Cửa Việt Base was damaged by an explosion, killing one sailor. At 04:00 two other LCMs were damaged by explosions. At 04:20 an explosive ordinance team detonated another satchel charge attached to an LCM and at 05:48 another explosion hit an LCM. U.S. Navy personnel saw a swimmer in the water and fired on him and at dawn found a dead North Vietnamese swimmer wearing Soviet scuba gear.

== Aftermath ==
During the course of the fighting Marine casualties were 520 killed and 2,698 wounded while claiming the PAVN suffered 3,839 killed and 117 taken as prisoner of war. The defense of the eastern DMZ was increasingly the responsibility of U.S. Army units and the ARVN 1st Division.
