= Mutter's Ridge =

Ridge in Quảng Trị, Vietnam, named in 1966

- Nui Cay Tre Ridge
- Location within Vietnam

Highest point
- Coordinates: 16.832°N 106.844°E

Geography
- Country: Vietnam

Mutter's Ridge was the name given by U.S. Marines to the Núi Cây Tre ("Bamboo Mountain") ridge, in Quảng Trị Province. The ridge was formed by Hills 461, 484 and 400 and overlooked the southern edge of the Vietnamese Demilitarized Zone (DMZ) to the north and Route 9 to the south.

The ridge was contested between the Marines and the People's Army of Vietnam (PAVN) starting with Operation Prairie in August 1966 and was named for the radio callsign of the 3rd Battalion 4th Marines which secured the ridge in September/October 1966.

From 1966 to 1969, the Marines variously established and abandoned bases along the ridge to support operations against the PAVN, including Landing Zone Mack on Hill 484, Landing Zone Margo and Landing Zone Sierra.

It is on this ridge that Larry Burrows shot his famous picture of a wounded black sergeant "reaching out" to a white comrade sitting in the mud.
