= Ca Lu Combat Base =

- Quảng Trị Province
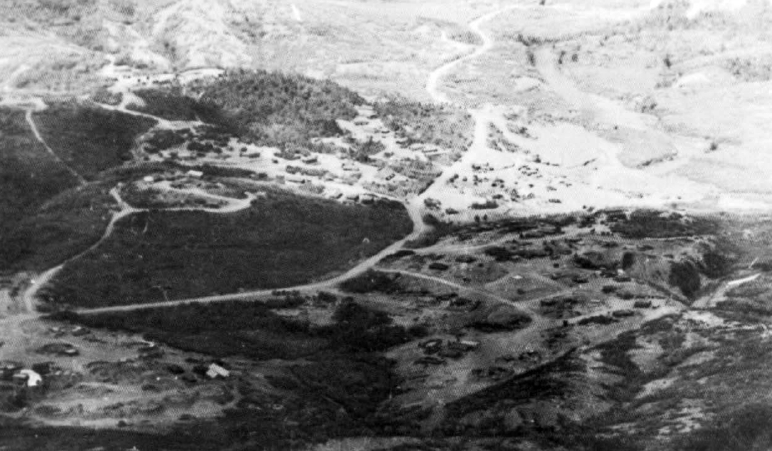
- Ca Lu Combat Base in December 1968

Site information
- Type: Marines

Location
- Coordinates: 16°41′31.51″N 106°53′8.49″E

Site history
- Built: 1966
- In use: 1966–1969
- Battles/wars: Vietnam War

Ca Lu Combat Base (Vietnamese: Cà Lu) was an Army of the Republic of Vietnam (ARVN) and United States Marine Corps base located on Highway or Route 9, near Krông Klang, Đa Krông District, western Quảng Trị Province, South Vietnam.

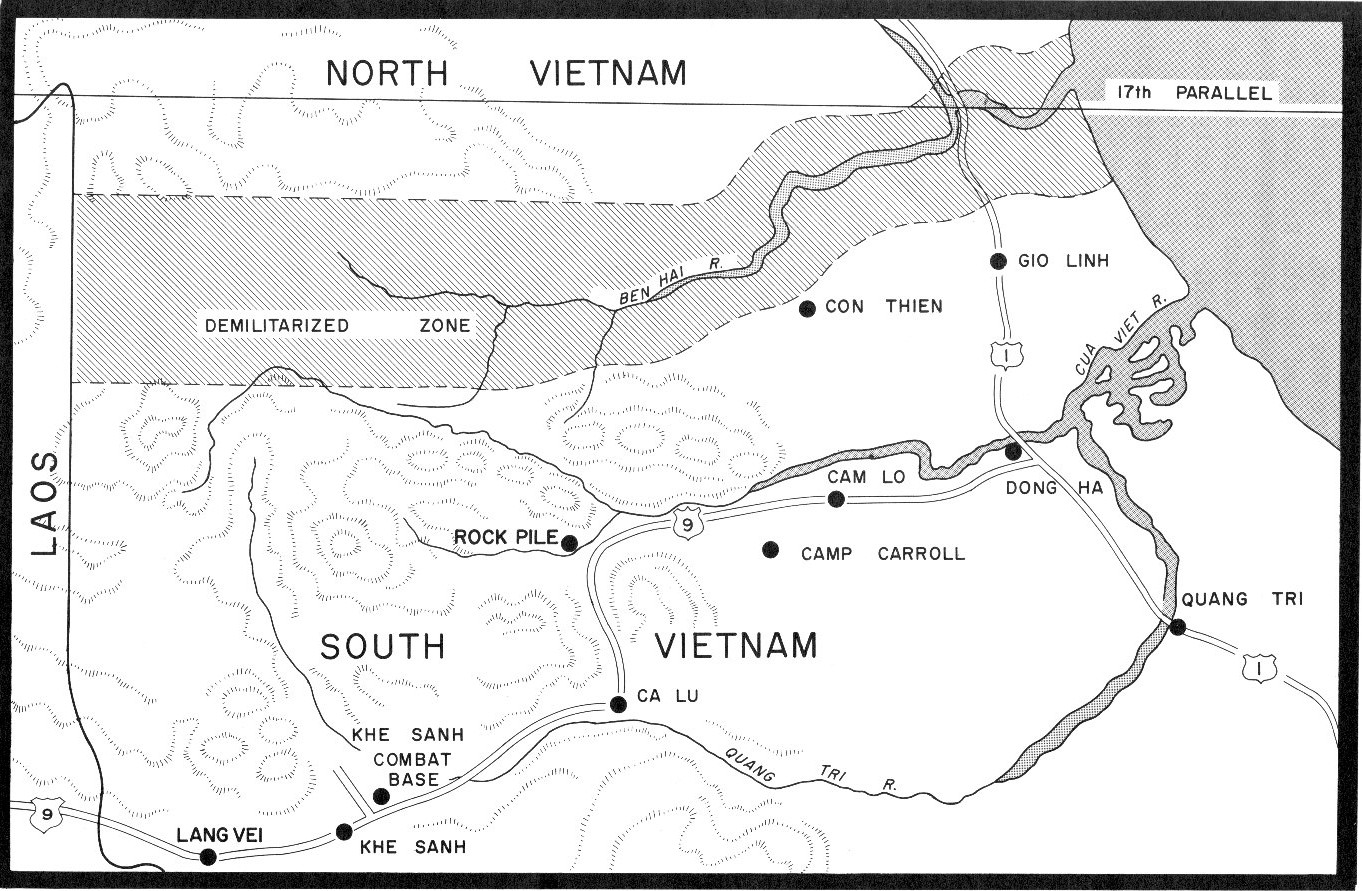
Map showing location of the Ca Lu Combat Base

The base was originally established by the ARVN to cover the infiltration route across the Vietnamese Demilitarized Zone (DMZ) through the Cam Lo river valley. The base was taken over by the 3rd Marine Division during Operation Virginia in April 1966 by the 4th Marine Regiment, with three 105 mm howitzers, a command group and a security force were positioned there.

By February 1967, six 105 mm howitzers operated by the 12th Marine Regiment were located at Ca Lu, with companies from the 3rd Battalion, 3rd Marines providing security. From August 1967 the North Vietnamese People's Army of Vietnam (PAVN) cut Route 9 between Ca Lu and Khe Sanh Combat Base. In late 1967 work began on expanding Ca Lu into a combat operating base and by December 1967 the base was completed. Ca Lu was the westernmost position of the strongpoint obstacle system, a line of sensors and obstacles intended to prevent infiltration across the DMZ.

In 1968 Ca Lu fell within the Lancaster tactical area of operations under the control of the 3rd Marine Regiment. In support of their attack on Khe Sanh, the PAVN isolated the Marine outposts along Route 9, attacking supply and engineering convoys and on 28 February they shot down a CH-46 helicopter near Ca Lu, killing 22 marines on board. By late March Route 9 into Ca Lu had been reopened and Marine and United States Army engineers and Navy Seabees started construction of a major base near Ca Lu to include an airfield, ammunition storage facilities, bunkers and helicopter revetments and a supporting road network, named Landing Zone Stud. On 28 March, the 1st Cavalry Division took over operational control of Ca Lu in preparation for the launch of Operation Pegasus, the relief of Khe Sanh. The 1st Battalion, 1st Marines remained at Ca Lu, providing security for the recently completed LZ Stud. With the closure of Khe Sanh Combat Base in July 1968, Ca Lu and Landing Zone Stud, renamed Vandegrift Combat base were the westernmost Marine bases along the DMZ.

In September 1969 as part of the withdrawal of the 3rd Marine Division from South Vietnam, preparations began for the Marines to withdraw from Ca Lu and Vandegrift. In early October the 4th Marine Regiment withdrew from Ca Lu and Vandegrift handing control of the bases to the ARVN 1st Division which dismantled and salvaged material at the bases for the expansion of the combat base at Camp Carroll.
