= 3rd Marine Division =

Active US Marine Corps formation

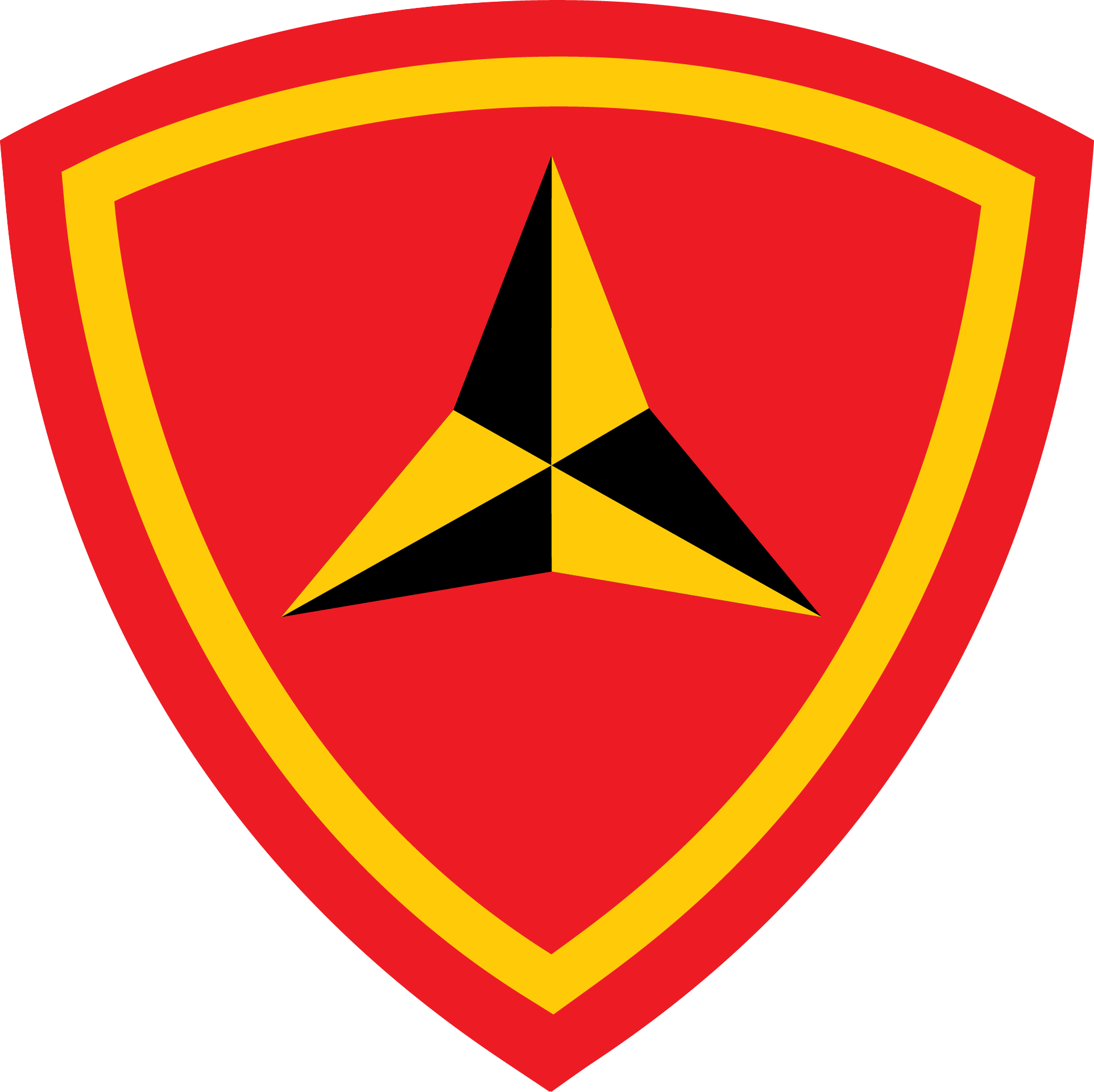
- 3rd Marine Division insignia
- Active: 1942–1945, 1952–present
- Country: United States of America
- Branch: United States Marine Corps
- Type: Ground combat element
- Size: Division (military)
- Part of: III Marine Expeditionary Force
- Garrison/HQ: Camp Courtney
- Nickname: "Fighting Third" "Caltrap"
- Mottos: Fidelity, Valor, Honor
- Engagements: World War II; Battle of Bougainville; Battle of Guam; Battle of Iwo Jima; Vietnam War; Operation Starlite; First Battle of Khe Sanh; Operation Hastings; Operation Buffalo; Operation Kingfisher; Operation Kentucky; Operation Virginia Ridge; Operation Idaho Canyon; Tet Offensive; Battle of Khe Sanh; Con Thien; Gulf War; Operation Desert Storm; War on terror; Afghanistan

Commanders
- Commanding General: Maj. Gen. Kyle B. Ellison
- Sergeant Major: SgtMaj Robert W. Schieler
- Notable commanders: Charles D. Barrett; Graves B. Erskine; William E. Riley; William R. Collins; Wood B. Kyle; Rathvon M. Tompkins; Bruno Hochmuth; Raymond G. Davis

The 3rd Marine Division is a division of the United States Marine Corps based at Camp Courtney, Marine Corps Base Camp Smedley D. Butler in Okinawa, Japan. It is one of three active duty infantry divisions in the Marine Corps and together with the 1st Marine Aircraft Wing (1st MAW) and the 3rd Marine Logistics Group (3rd MLG) forms the III Marine Expeditionary Force (III MEF). The division was first formed during World War II and saw four years of continuous combat in the Vietnam War. Today, elements of the 3rd Marine Division are continuously forward deployed to carry out U.S. Government missions in conjunction with its sister services.

== History ==
=== World War II ===
3rd Marine Division Battle of Iwo Jima order of battle (click to enlarge)

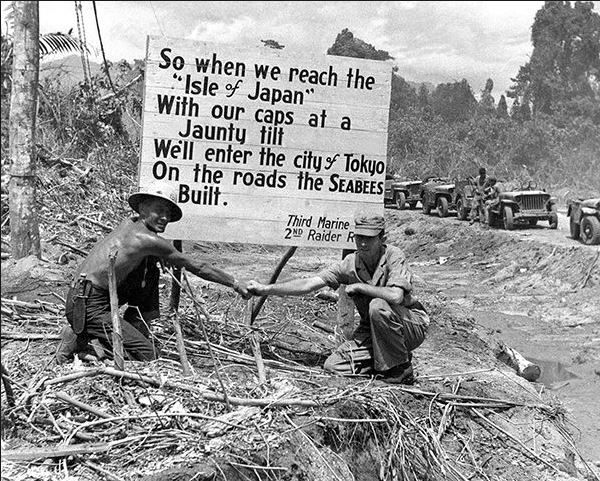
3rd Marine Division, 2nd Raider's sign on Bougainville

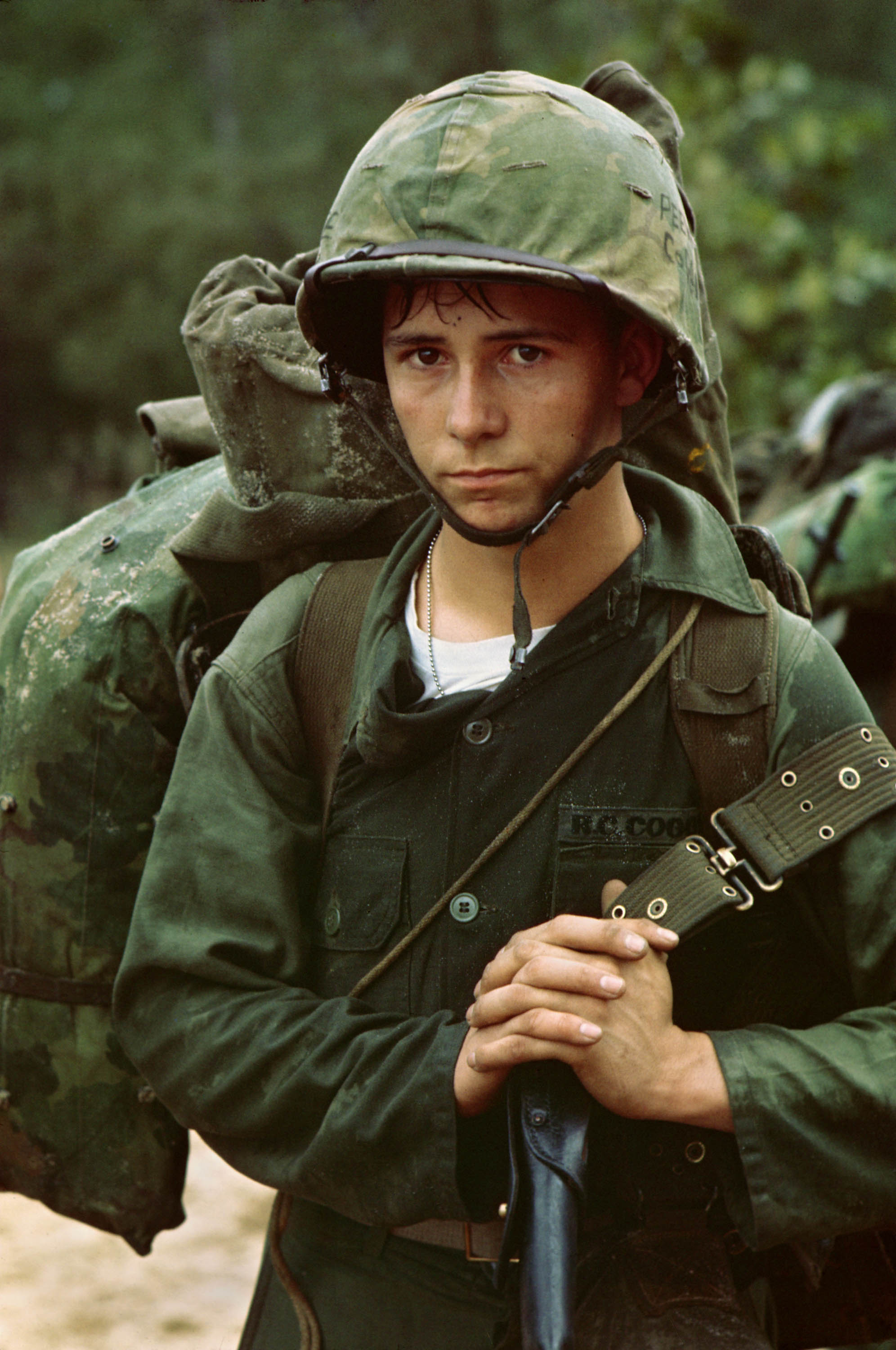
A young Marine waits on the beach at Da Nang in Vietnam during the Marine landing, March 8, 1965.

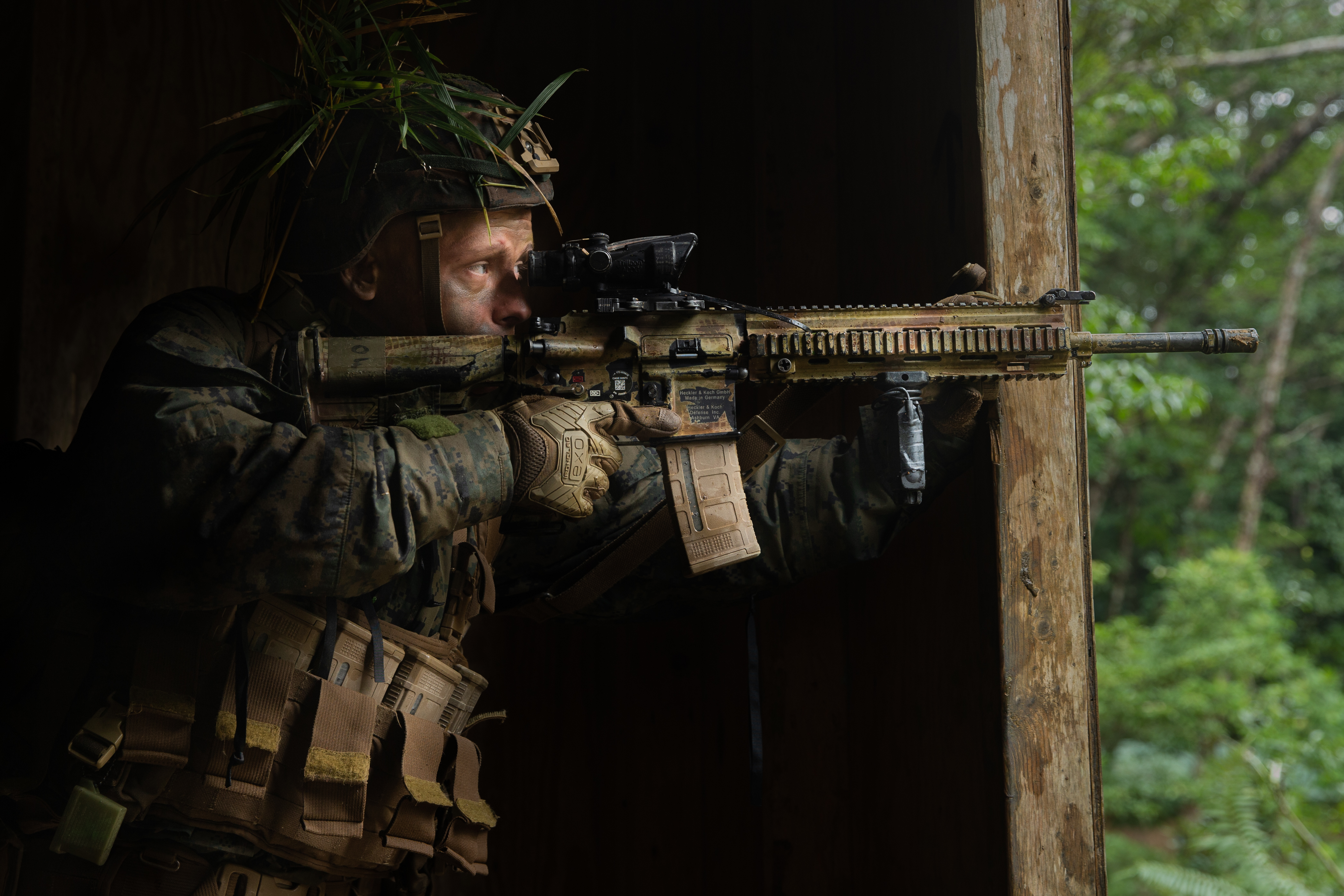
U.S. Marine Corps Lance Cpl. Eric Kassow, a rifleman with 3rd Marine Division, provides security during the 3d Marine Division Rifle Squad Competition at Camp Gonsalves, Okinawa, Japan

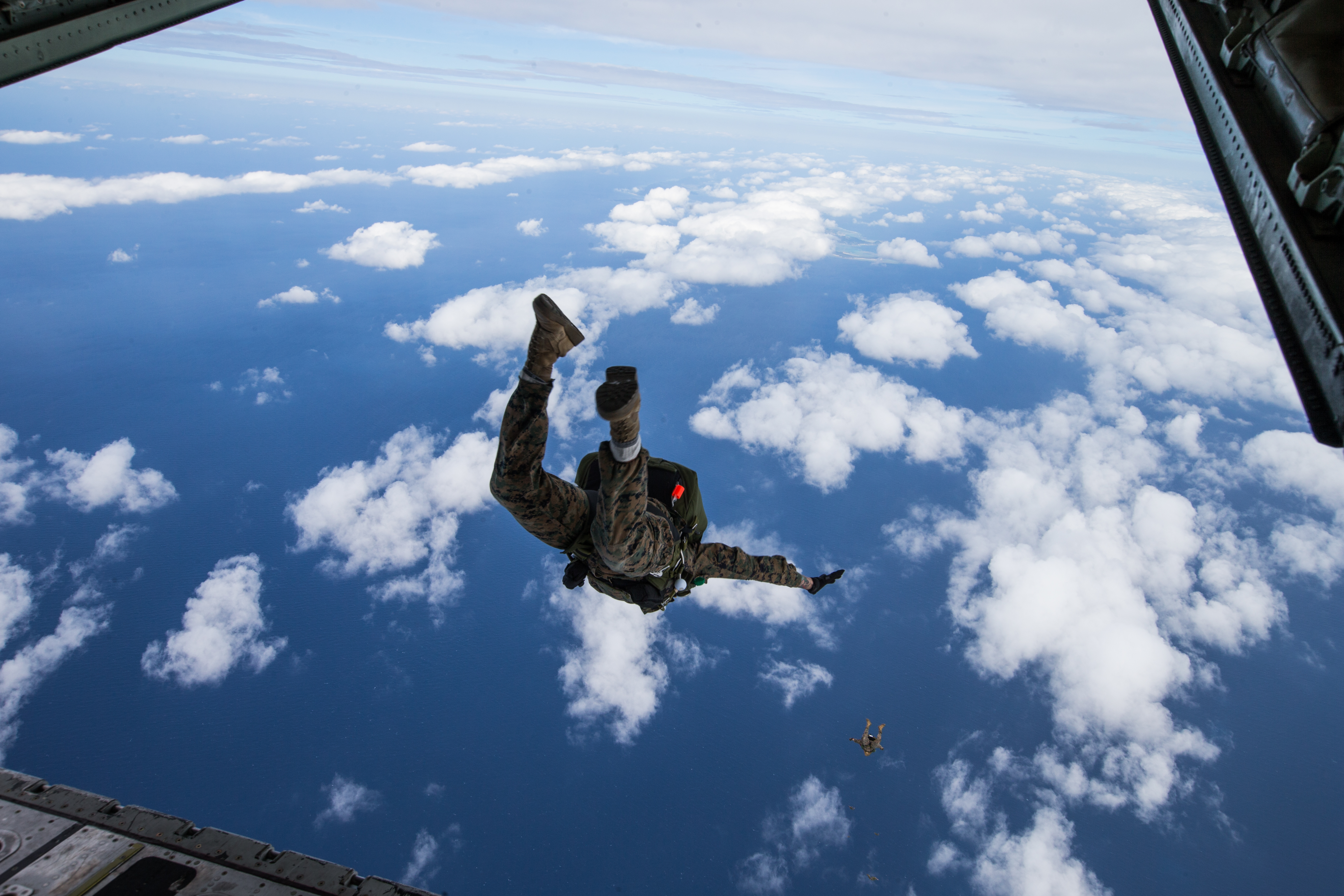
U.S. Marines with 3rd Reconnaissance Battalion, 3rd Marine Division conduct parachute operations by jumping out of a KC-130 Hercules Okinawa, Japan

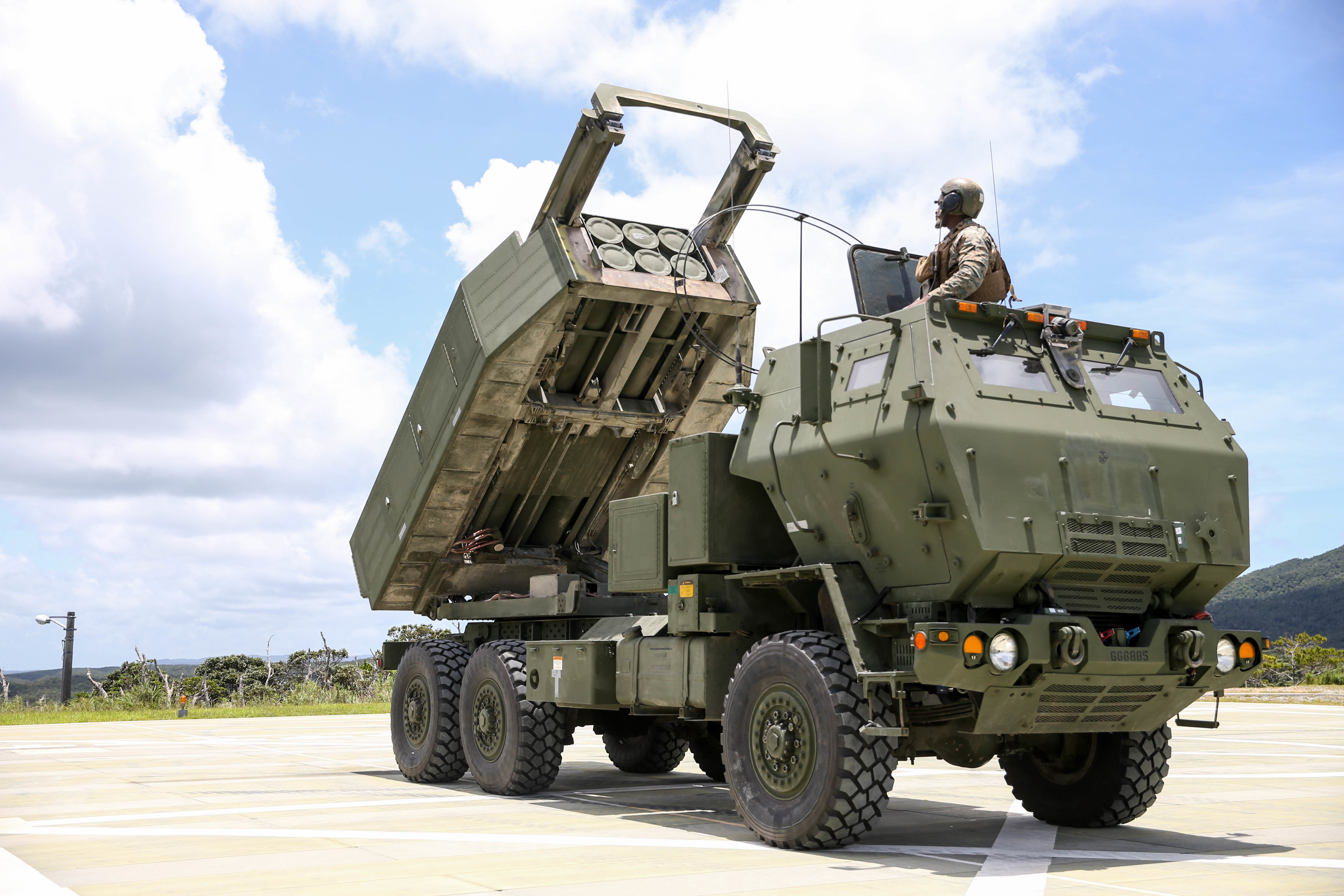
U.S. Marines with 3rd Battalion, 12th Marine Regiment, 3rd Marine Division, conduct a fire mission with a High Mobility Artillery Rocket System during an Expeditionary Advance Base Operation exercise at the Northern Training Area, Okinawa, Japan, 18 June 2020. This 1st Battalion, 6th Marine Regiment-led exercise also features participation from 3rd Reconnaissance Battalion and HIMARS from 3rd Battalion, 12th Marine Regiment. Training events like this strengthen 3rd Marine Division’s ability to control key terrain in a contested battlespace. (U.S. Marine Corps photo by Cpl. Donovan Massieperez)

The 3rd Marine Division was officially activated on 16 September 1942 at Camp Elliott, San Diego, California. Most of the original members of the division were drawn from the cadre staff of the 2nd Marine Division. The division was initially built around the 9th Marine Regiment, commanded by Colonel Lemuel C. Shepherd, Jr. who later became the 20th Commandant of the Marine Corps. Major General Charles D. Barrett was the first commanding general of the division.

The division deployed into Auckland, New Zealand, between January and March 1943. In June of that year, it moved onto Guadalcanal for additional training, stopping first at Efate, New Hebrides for rehearsals (16-20 October 1943) and Santo, New Hebrides (21-29 October 1943) for shipboard-staging. 1 November 1943 saw the division land as part of the Battle of Bougainville and fight on the island until their last unit to arrive, the 21st Marine Regiment, embarked on 9 January 1944. During the course of the battle the division had about 423 Marines killed.

The division returned to Guadalcanal in January 1944 to rest, refit, and retrain. The next operation in which the division took part was the Battle of Guam. From 21 July 1944 until the last day of organized fighting on 10 August, the division fought through the jungles on the island of Guam. During these 21 days of fighting, the division captured over 60 square miles (160 km^{2}) of territory and killed over 5,000 enemy soldiers. The next two months saw continuous mopping up operations in which the Marines continued to engage leftover Japanese forces. At the end of the battle the division had sustained 677 Marines killed, 3,626 wounded, and nine missing.

The division remained on the island of Guam for training, until it embarked as part of the landing force for the Battle of Iwo Jima. The 3rd Marine Division was initially in reserve for the battle. However, the division was committed one regiment at a time when the initial regiments that landed there needed to be relieved.

The 21st Marines came ashore on 21 February followed by the 9th Marines, 12th Marine Regiment, 3rd Tank Battalion, on 24 February. The Marines of these two infantry regiments, supported by the artillery of the 12th Marine Regiment and tanks of the 3rd Tank Battalion, fought on Iwo Jima until the end of organized resistance on 16 March and the subsequent mopping up operations for the next month. All elements of the division were back on Guam by 17 April 1945. The fighting on Iwo Jima cost the 3rd Marine Division 1,131 killed in action and another 4,438 wounded.

After the return to Guam, the division began preparing for the invasion of Japan. This invasion never took place since Japan surrendered on 15 August 1945. The 3rd Marine Division was decommissioned on 28 December 1945 at Marine Corps Base Camp Pendleton, CA.

During the war, the 3rd Marine Division had three Seabee Battalions assigned to it. The 25th Naval Construction Battalion (NCB) was posted to 19th Marines as the third battalion of the regiment. These landed on Bougainville, as did the 71st NCB which was assigned as the 3rd Division's shore party there.

The 25th NCB also landed during the assault on Guam as the shore party to the 3rd Marine Regiment, after which the 19th Marines were deactivated, and the 25th NCB was reassigned. The 62nd NCB was then posted TAD to the 3rd for Iwo Jima. They were in the reserve, but they became the lead battalion in getting airfield No. 1 operational, after of the many casualties taken by the primary assault Seabees, the 133rd NCB.

=== Korean War ===
The division was reactivated on 7 January 1952 at Camp Pendleton, California, using the assets of the 3d Marine Brigade activated in June 1951. Immediately after its activation and still in its organizational state, the division began intensive combat training, including new tactics and maneuvers based on lessons learned in the then-ongoing Korean War. During the remaining part of 1952 elements of the division participated in numerous exercises and training problems, including vertical envelopment (helicopter landing), airborne operations and attack, and defense against atomic weapons and missiles.

In August 1953 the division arrived in Japan to support the 1st Marine Division in the defense of the Far Eastern area. In March 1956 the division moved to Okinawa and remained there in a readiness posture until 1965. The 3rd Marine Division moved to Okinawa in June 1955 making an amphibious landing.

=== Vietnam War ===
The 3rd Battalion, 9th Marines, 9th Marine Expeditionary Brigade, were the first Marines to be sent to Vietnam in March 1965 to protect the Da Nang Air Base. On 6 May 1965, the 3rd Marine Division opened the Marine Compound at the Da Nang Air Base, Vietnam. By the end of 1965 the division had all its regiments (3rd Marines, 4th Marines and 9th Marines) on the ground.

In August 1966, the battalions of the 26th Marines (a 5th Marine Division unit) began arriving for combat duty in South Vietnam attached to the 3rd Marine Division. In October 1966, then commanding general Lewis W. Walt was ordered to establish strong points just south of the Vietnamese Demilitarized Zone (DMZ). The 3rd Division moved its headquarters from Da Nang to Phu Bai in late 1966. At the same time the division was also building outposts along the southern half of the DMZ at Con Thien, Gio Linh, Cam Lộ and Đông Hà. The first major multi-regiment operations against the People's Army of Vietnam (PAVN) was Operation Hastings in July 1966. Operation Prairie followed in October. This area would come to be known as Leatherneck Square. In late 1967 the headquarters moved again from Phu Bai to Đông Hà in the Quang Tri Province and more outposts were opened. Camp Carroll, Rockpile, Ca Lu and Khe Sanh. The two main enemy divisions the Marines fought were the 320th Division and the 324B Division.

On 14 November 1967, the 3rd Marine Division commander Major General Bruno Hochmuth was killed northwest of Huế in a helicopter crash. Some of the major operations in 1967 and early 1968 in this area were Operation Prairie III, Operation Prairie IV, Operation Hickory I, Operation Cimarron, Operation Buffalo, Operation Kingfisher and Operation Kentucky.

Nearly 8,000 PAVN were killed during this time period. The Marines suffered over 1400 killed and over 9,000 wounded. There were five Medals of Honor awarded and nearly 40 Navy Crosses given during this period of time. For extraordinary heroism in the Republic of Vietnam from 8 March 1965 to 15 September 1967, the division was awarded the Navy Presidential Unit Citation.

During the 1968 Tet Offensive, the division conducted operations along the DMZ with a portion of the division fighting in the Battle of Huế. At the time, 3rd Marine Division intelligence estimated the combat strength of PAVN and Viet Cong (VC) forces in the DMZ area was 40,943 troops. The PAVN and VC stepped up their attacks by fire on every combat base in the division area of operations. This included daily attempts at interdiction of naval traffic on the Cua Viet River near Đông Hà. The division had to invest many of its assets to open the Cua Viet River to traffic. BLT 5/l, the Landing Force of SLF B, remained under the operational control (OPCON) of the division throughout February 1968. BLT 3/l continued Operation Saline under operational control of the 1st Amphibian Tractor Battalion with the mission of clearing the area adjacent to the Cua Viet River between Cua Viet and Đông Hà. BLT 2nd Battalion, 4th Marines, the Landing Force of SLF A, remained under operational control of the division throughout the month. BLT 2/4 conducted operations in the Lancaster II and Kentucky areas.

During the Vietnam War, the 3rd Marine Division suffered 6,869 men killed in action.

The division departed South Vietnam in November 1969 with more than 20 Marines having received the Medal of Honor and moved to Camp Courtney, Okinawa, where it is presently located.

=== Saudi Arabia ===
3d Marine Regiment, 3d Marine Division was one of the first combat forces to deploy to Saudi Arabia in response to the Iraqi invasion of Kuwait on 2 August 1990. The regiment, which became known as task Force Taro in honor of the state and people of Hawaii, became the first American unit to be engaged by Iraqi artillery, rocket and missile fire on 18 January 1991. Task Force Taro countered the Iraqi supporting attacks by conducting artillery raids into Kuwait as the first ground offensive actions of the war. Task force Taro was instrumental in the recapture of Khafji, was the first unit to advance into Kuwait, conducted the only helicopter borne assault of the war and secured the Marine Corp’s final objective of the war, Kuwait International Airport.

Following the cease-fire on 28 February 1991, the regiment redeployed to Saudi Arabia and subsequently completed its strategic redeployment to Hawaii two months later.

=== Afghanistan ===
In September 2008, 3d Marine Regiment was appointed to be the command element (CE) for a Special Purpose Marine Air Ground Task Force - Afghanistan (SPMAGTF-A). In October 2008, SPMAGTF-A deployed to Kandahar, Afghanistan in support of combat operations in Regional Command South (RC-S) and Regional Command West as part of Operation Enduring Freedom and the GWOT. The Regiment returned to Helmand from late 2009 through May 2010, where it participated in Operation Moshtarak, also known as the Battle of Marjah.

=== Iraq ===
From July 2004 through April 2005, Charlie Battery, 1st Battalion 12th Marines, deployed in support of Operation Iraqi Freedom. They were attached to 1st Battalion 3rd Marines and deployed to Fallujah, Iraq participating in Operation Phantom Fury.

Present

3d Marine Division continues to train to respond to contingencies within the Indo-Pacific Region. From March to May 2011, the division participated in humanitarian relief efforts during Operation Tomodachi, providing humanitarian aid and disaster relief in Honshu, Japan. Today, the 3rd Marine Division carries out a variety of tasks to include supporting the US Government policy in the Indo-Pacific region, supporting diplomatic activities, combat training, integrating with other US federal agencies and humanitarian assistance missions.

== Structure ==
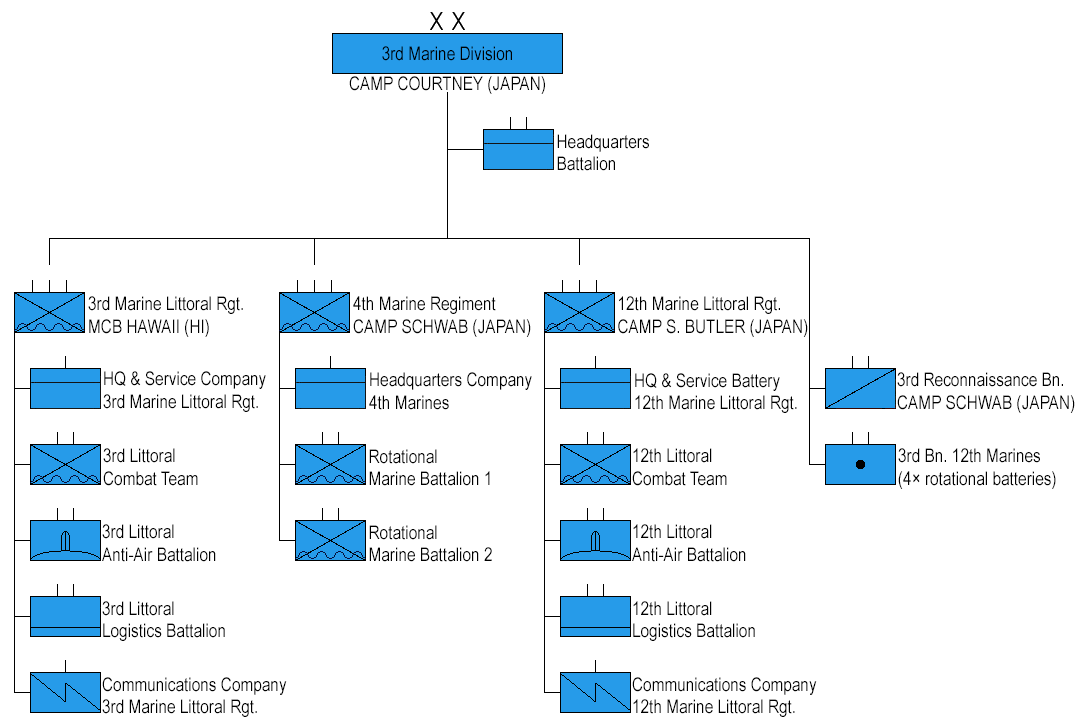
3rd Marine Division organization as of May 2026 (click to enlarge)

As of May 2026 the 3rd Marine Division consists of:

- Headquarters Battalion
- 3rd Marine Littoral Regiment
- 4th Marine Regiment
  - 2× rotational battalions from the 1st Marine Division and 2nd Marine Division
- 12th Marine Littoral Regiment
- 3rd Reconnaissance Battalion
- 3rd Battalion, 12th Marines
  - 4× rotational batteries from the 10th Marine Regiment and 11th Marine Regiment
- Jungle Warfare Training Center, Okinawa (Will transition to United States Marine Corps Training and Education Command)

== Unit awards ==
A unit citation or commendation is an award bestowed upon an organization for the action cited. Members of the unit who participated in said actions are allowed to wear on their uniforms the appropriate ribbon of the awarded unit citation. 3d Marine Division has been awarded the following:

Streamer	Award	Year(s)	Additional Info
	Presidential Unit Citation Streamer with one Bronze Star	1945, 1965–1967	Iwo Jima, Vietnam War
	Navy Unit Commendation Streamer with one Bronze Star	1945, 2002–2003	Iwo Jima, Western Pacific
	Meritorious Unit Commendation Streamer	2004–2005	Indonesia Tsunami Relief
	Asiatic-Pacific Campaign Streamer with four Bronze Stars		Bougainville, Northern Solomons, Guam, Iwo Jima
	World War II Victory Streamer	1942–1945	Pacific War
	National Defense Service Streamer with three Bronze Stars	1950–1954, 1961–1974, 1990–1995, 2001–present	Korean War, Vietnam War, Gulf War, war on terrorism
	Korean Service Streamer		
	Vietnam Service Streamer with two Silver and one Bronze Stars	April 1965 - May 1969, March - May 1975	Quang Tri, Quang Nam, Thua Thien, Evacuation Operations in Vietnam and Cambodia
	Global War on Terrorism Expeditionary Streamer		
	Global War on Terrorism Service Streamer	2001 – present	
	Vietnam Gallantry Cross with Palm Streamer		

== See also ==
- List of 3rd Marine Division Commanders
- List of United States Marine Corps divisions
- Organization of the United States Marine Corps
- 25th Naval Construction Battalion (19th Marine Regiment)
