= Frank E. Garretson =

United States Marine Corps general

Frank Edmund Garretson
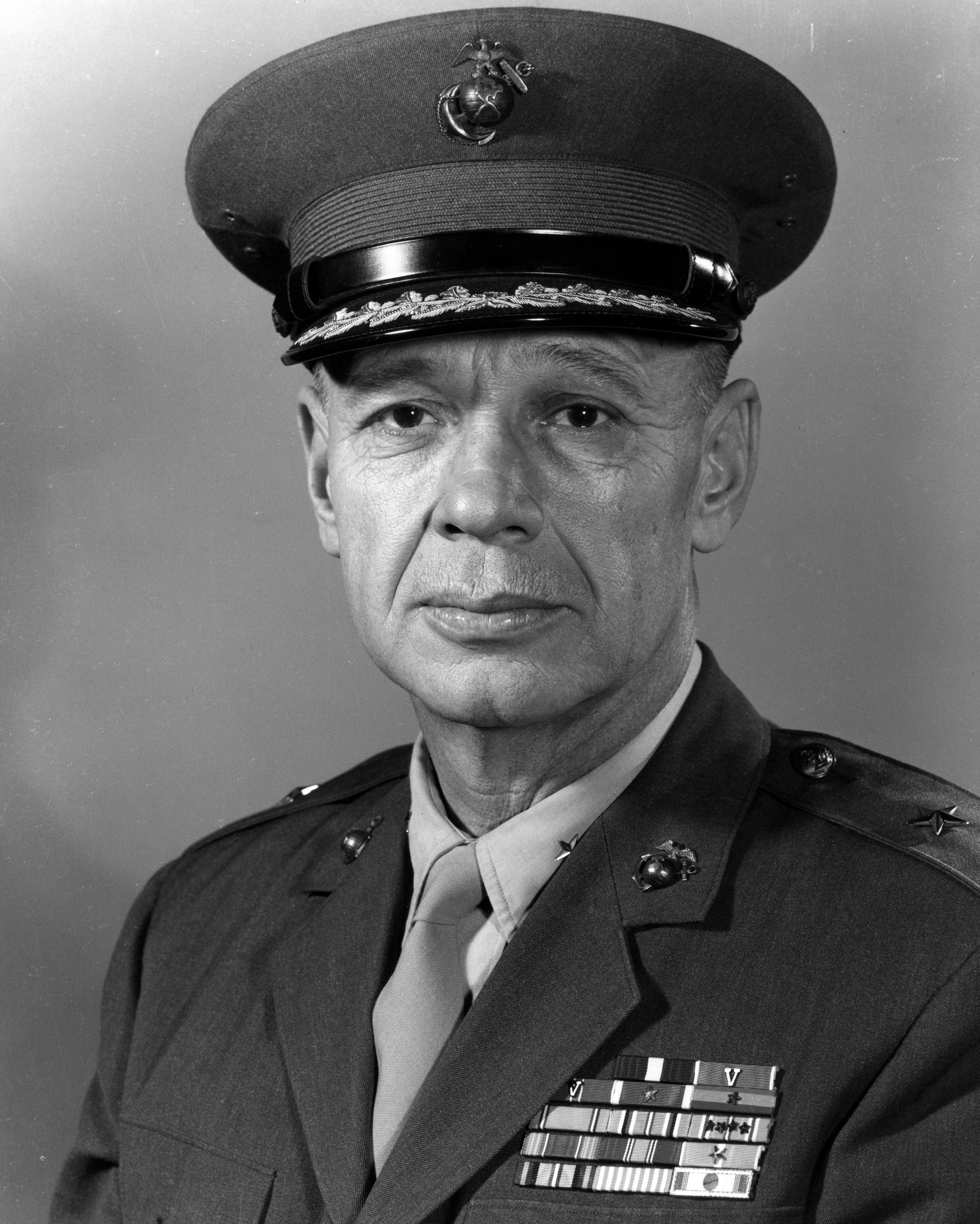
- Garretson as Brigadier general, USMC in February 1966
- Born: February 27, 1918; Salem, Iowa, US
- Died: January 23, 2006 (aged 87); San Diego, California, US
- Burial place: Fort Rosecrans National Cemetery
- Relatives: Herman Garretson (father)
- Military career
- Allegiance: United States
- Branch: United States Marine Corps
- Service years: 1940–1970
- Rank: Brigadier general
- Nickname: "Daisy"
- Service number: 0-7639
- Commands: Camp Butler; Director of Information; 9th Marine Regiment; 2nd Battalion, 24th Marines
- Conflicts: World War II: Battle of Kwajalein; Battle of Saipan; Battle of Tinian; Battle of Iwo Jima; Korean War: Battle of Inchon; Vietnam War: Operation Purple Martin; Operation Scotland II
- Awards: Navy Cross; Distinguished Service Medal; Legion of Merit (3); Bronze Star Medal; Purple Heart (2)

Frank Edmund Garretson (February 27, 1918 – January 23, 2006) was an American military officer who served in the United States Marine Corps with the rank of brigadier general. A veteran of World War II, he distinguished himself as commanding officer of Company F, 2nd Battalion, 24th Marines, 4th Marine Division during the attack on Namur Island, Kwajalein Atoll, on February 1–2, 1944 and received the Navy Cross, the United States' second-highest decoration awarded for valor in combat.

Garretson remained in the Marines and participated in battles in the Korean War and Vietnam War. He served as commander of Task Force Hotel, which was assigned the task of maintaining the defense of Khe Sanh Combat Base and the surrounding outposts in 1968–1969. Garretson retired as deputy commander, Camp Pendleton in June 1970.

== Early career ==
Frank E. Garretson was born on February 27, 1918, in Salem, Iowa, as the oldest son of farmer and football coach of Iowa Wesleyan Tigers, Herman John Garretson and Marion Scott Becker. His mother died, when Frank was only seven years old, and his family moved to California, where his father later remarried to woman named Helen Huston. The whole family moved to Seattle, Washington, where young Garretsons attended the Garfield High School. While at the high school, Frank excelled in football and track and was recruited by the Washington Huskies football, representing the University of Washington.

Garretson earned a scholarship and played for Huskies as Guard, Center, and also Quarterback and was nicknamed "Daisy" by teammates. He was also a member of Phi Gamma Delta fraternity and was active in Big "W" Club, uniting all athletes who won "W" Letter in any university sport. Must be mentioned, that Garretson was also a member of the Oval Club, whose members aided High School Leaders' Conference in Washington state and sponsored the Ballet Moose.

Upon the graduation with Bachelor of Arts degree in summer of 1940, Garretson enlisted the United States Marine Corps on October 25, 1940, and was ordered to Officer Candidates School at Marine Corps Base Quantico, Virginia. Upon completion of the officers' instruction in February 1941, he was commissioned second lieutenant and ordered to the Marine barracks at Bremerton Navy Yard, Washington, where he served as a guard company officer and the rifle range officer. He was also promoted to first lieutenant during that time. Garretson married Cecily Forbes of Seattle in August 1941.

== World War II ==
Following the United States entry into World War II, Garretson was still serving in Bremerton, before he was promoted to captain on August 7, 1942, and transferred to Camp Elliott near San Diego, California. Camp Elliot served as the Fleet Marine Force Training Center and Garretson served under Colonel William B. Croka as company commander of the Rifle Range Company, co-responsible for the rifle, pistol, and machine gun training.

In May 1943, Garretson was transferred to Camp Pendleton, California, where he joined recently formed 2nd Battalion, 24th Marine Regiment, a part of 4th Marine Division. He assumed command of Company "F" and participated in the intensive training focused on scouting and patrolling, firing of weapons, landings from LCVP's, night attacks and defenses, the use of cover, concealment, and camouflage, map work, close combat with bayonet, knife, and Judo. Following landing exercise at San Clemente Island, the units of 4th Marine Division departed for South Pacific area, and after brief stop on Hawaii in January 1944, it sailed for Marshall Islands.

The 24th's objective was Roi-Namur island, serving as strategic Japanese Airfield and base, and 2nd Battalion under Lieutenant Colonel Francis H. Brink landed on February 1, 1944, on the right flank, where the preponderance of warehouses, barracks and pillboxes was situated. Although Garretson was twice wounded when his company sustained heavy casualties as a result of a blockhouse explosion, he refused evacuation and valiantly led the remains of his forces to the battalion objective where, in the face of heavy enemy machine-gun and rifle fire, he directed scattered elements of the landing team in the reorganization and consolidation of the position.

Later, after a coordinated attack by tanks and infantry had been ordered, he intercepted the tank support which had opened fire prematurely before reaching the line of departure and, fearlessly exposing himself to fire from the Japanese and from friendly tanks, succeeded in having the word relayed to cease all tank firing and at the same time gave instructions for the tank deployment during the impending attack. Garretson was decorated with the Navy Cross, the United States' second-highest decoration awarded for his valor in combat. He also received two Purple Hearts for his wounds.

Garretson and his regiment were ordered back to Hawaii for rest and refit and later began with the preparations for new objective – Mariana Islands. The 24th Marines sailed for Saipan, which served as a Japanese forward base and was located only 1,270 miles from Tokyo. The 24th Marines landed on Saipan on June 16, 1944, and was in Division Reserve for first two days. Garretson was promoted to major and assumed duty as 2nd Battalion's executive officer under lieutenant colonel Richard Rothwell. The battalion met heavy resistance from caves along Magicienne Bay and then returned to Division Reserve. By the end of campaign, the 24th Marines took part in the mooping up operations against scattered remnants of Japanese infantry.

Following Saipan, lieutenant colonel Rothwell was detached for another assignment and Garretson assumed command of 2nd Battalion and was ordered to Tinian, neighboring island. The objective was to capture another Japanese Airfield on the island and cut the main road to the Airfield. Garretson and his unit met only occasional small arms fire before the battalion dug in for the night, when Japanese launched night counter-attack with tanks and infantry. The 24th Marines then operated near the west coast of the island and ran into Japanese positions that included a series of mutually supporting bunkers. For his service in the Mariana Islands campaign, Garretson was decorated with the Legion of Merit with Combat "V".

The Fourth Marine Division was then ordered to Maui, Hawaii, where Garretson participated in the intensive training of replacements for casualties sustained in the Marianas. He resumed his duties as 2nd Battalion's executive officer, when lieutenant colonel Rothwell rejoined the battalion.

On February 19, 1945, the 24th Marines went ashore on Iwo Jima and Garretson participated in the attacks on Motoyama Airfields No. 1 and No. 2. and assault on Hill 382, where he and his troops encountered numerous pillboxes with mortars and infantry. He remained on Iwo Jima until the end of combats by the end of March. For his service during that campaign, Garretson was decorated with the Bronze Star Medal with Combat "V".

== Postwar service ==
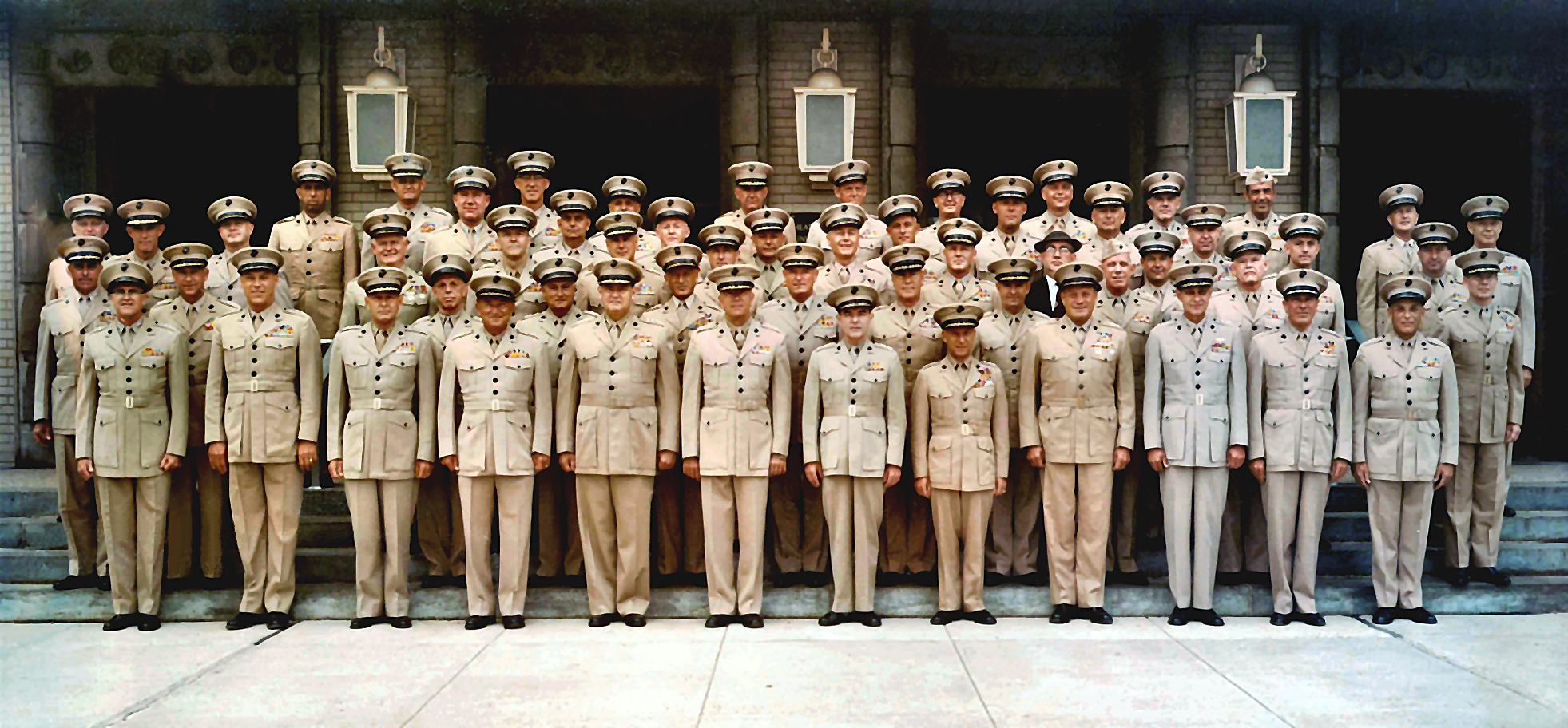
Garretson (1st from right, 4th Row) at General officers Symposium in 1967.

Following the battle, the 24th Marines returned to Maui, Hawaii, and Garretson was appointed commanding officer of 3rd Battalion. He led his battalion back to Camp Pendleton, California, in October 1945, when it was deactivated. Garretson then assumed duty as executive officer of the Guard Battalion at Camp Pendleton and later was promoted to commanding officer of that battalion.

In September 1946, Garretson was ordered to the Army Infantry School at Fort Benning, Georgia and attended the advanced course there in June 1947. He was subsequently transferred to the staff of the Marine Corps Schools, Quantico, where he assumed duty as an instructor in Infantry tactics in the Combined Arms Section, Amphibious Warfare School.

Upon the United States entry into Korean War in June 1950, Garretson was transferred to the staff of Commander, Amphibious Group 3 under Rear Admiral Lyman A. Thackrey as Senior Marine Officer and Assistant Operations and Plans Officer and participated in the planning of logistical support during the Battle of Inchon. He was promoted to lieutenant colonel in January 1951 and returned to the United States in April that year.

Following his return stateside, Garretson became head of the Officer Ground Control Unit, Personnel Department at Headquarters Marine Corps under Major General John T. Walker. He was later appointed Officer Coordinator of the Detail Branch in that Department and remained in that capacity until August 1953, when he was transferred to Hawaii for duty as executive officer, 4th Marine Regiment under Colonel John C. Miller Jr. The Fourth Marines were stationed at Camp Nara, Honshu as the part of 3rd Marine Division and served as a garrison force in Japan and its assigned mission was that of sharing in the defense responsibilities for southern Honshu and of being ready for rapid transfer to potential hot spots in the Far East.

The Fourth Marines were transferred to Marine Corps Air Station Kaneohe Bay, Hawaii in February 1955, to become the ground echelon of the 1st Marine Brigade and Garretson became Brigade's assistant chief of staff for logistics (G-4) in August 1956. Garretson served under Brigadier General George R. E. Shell until May 1957, when he was ordered to the Army Command and General Staff College at Fort Leavenworth, Kansas, for senior course.

Upon graduation in June 1958, Garretson was ordered to the Marine Corps Schools, Quantico for duty as an instructor in the Senior School. While in this capacity, he was promoted to colonel on July 1, 1959, and assumed duty as Senior Instructor at the Senior School. Garretson assumed duty as director of the Senior School in July 1960 and after one year in that assignment he was transferred to the Headquarters Marine Corps in Washington, D.C., for duty as secretary of the General Staff, Office of the Chief of Staff under Lieutenant General Wallace M. Greene. While in Washington, Garretson earned Master of Arts degree in international affairs from George Washington University and also completed senior course at the National War College in June 1964.

== Vietnam War ==
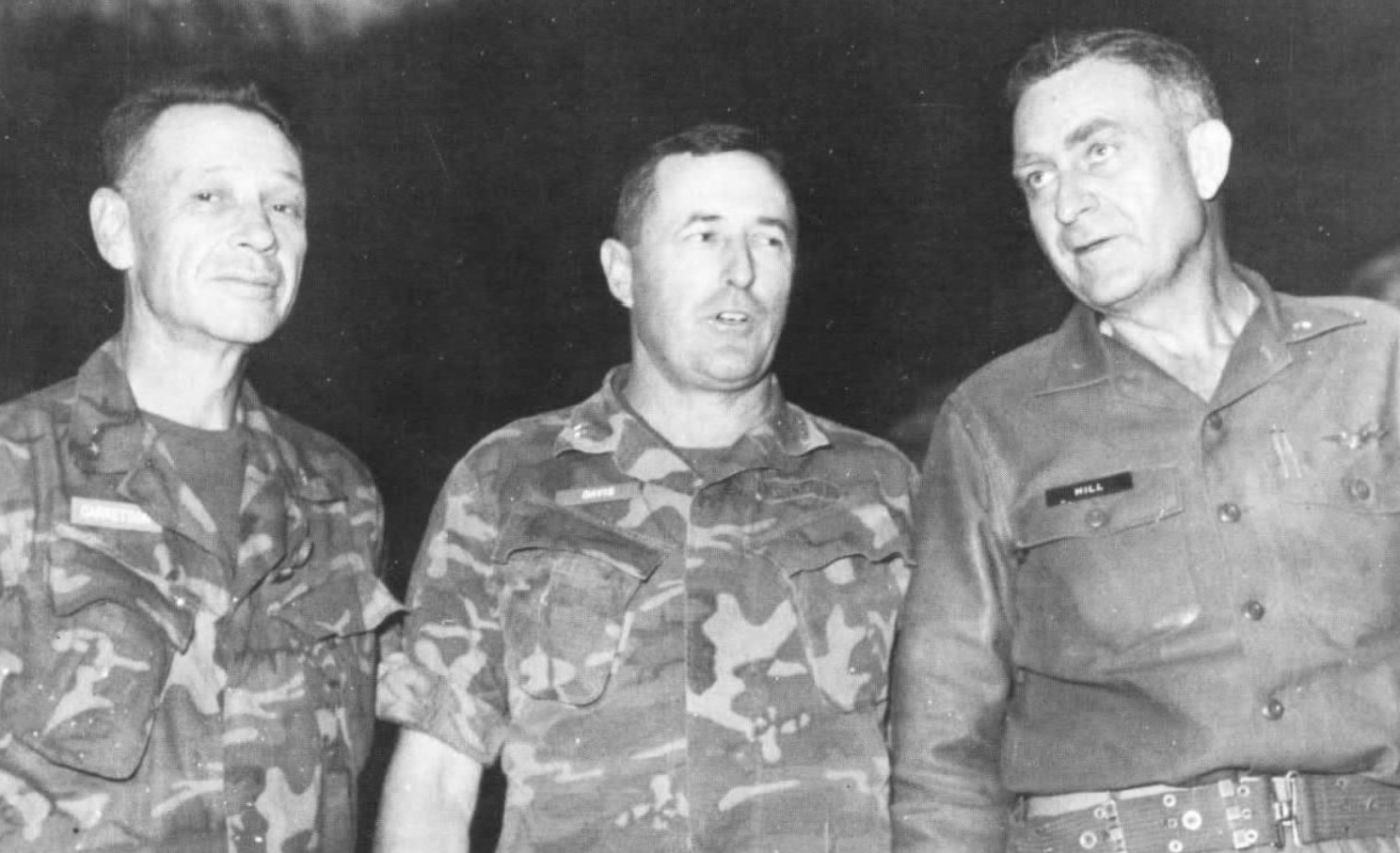
Garretson (left) discusses the aviation requirements for the 3rd Marine Division with Major general Raymond G. Davis (center) and Brigadier General Homer S. Hill, Assistant Commander, 1st Marine Aircraft Wing in South Vietnam, May 1968.

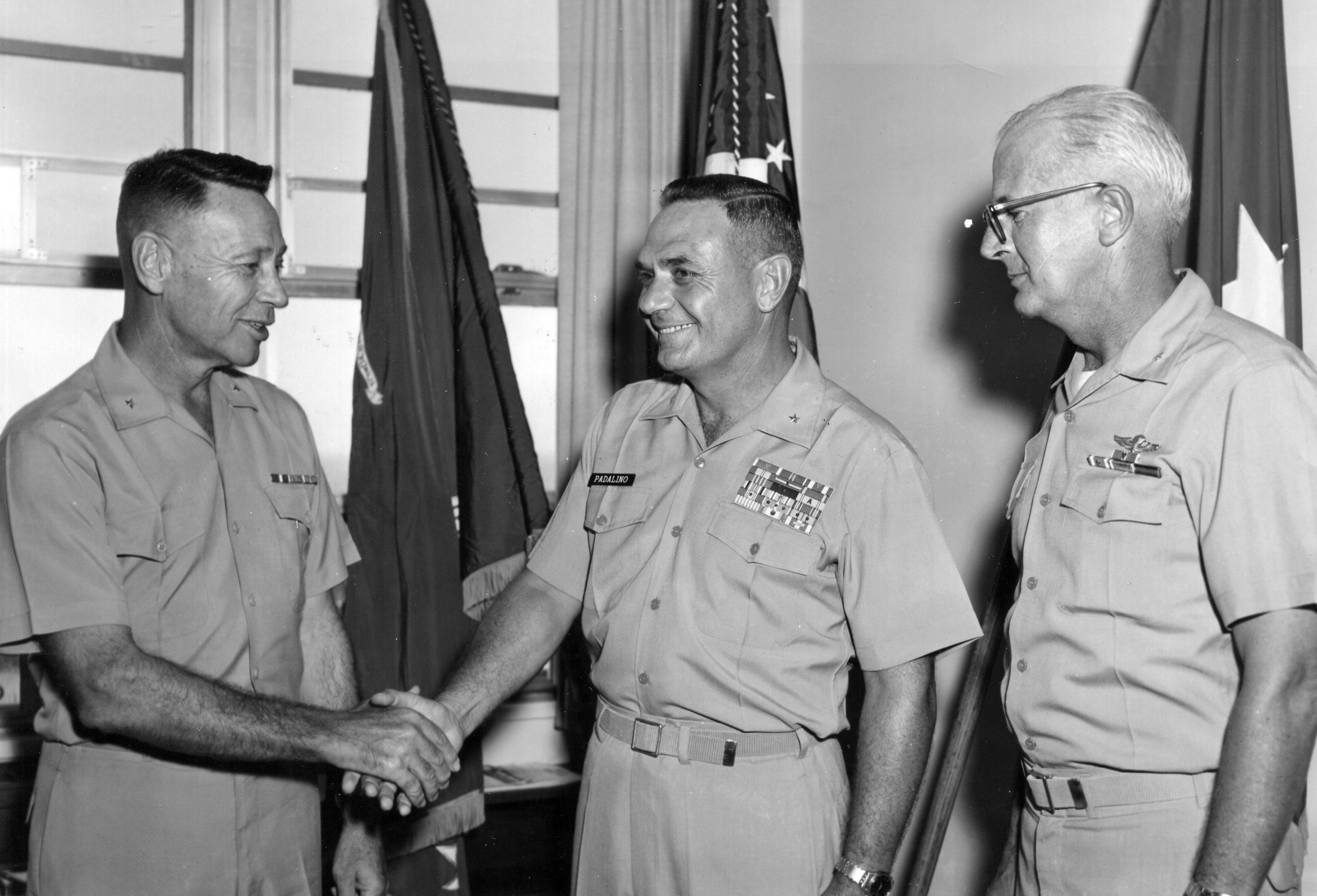
Garretson (left) congratulates newly promoted BrigGen. Mauro J. Padalino (center) on his promotion to new rank. BrigGen. Robert B. Carney Jr. looks on, Camp Courtney, Okinawa, August 1969.

Garretson was ordered to Okinawa, Japan, in August 1964 and assumed command of 9th Marine Regiment attached to 3rd Marine Division under Major General William R. Collins. Following the Gulf of Tonkin incident the same month, which led to the escalation of Vietnam War, Garretson began with the preparation for deployment of his regiment.

By the beginning of July 1965, Garretson moved his headquarters from Okinawa to Da Nang, South Vietnam, and his regiment was responsible for the defense of Da Nang Air Base against Viet Cong attacks. He was transferred back to the United States by the end of August and received his second Legion of Merit with Combat "V" for his service in Da Nang.

Garretson was then ordered to Washington, D.C., and assumed duty as Marine Corps liaison officer to the Chief of Naval Operations, Admiral David L. McDonald. For his new billet, he was promoted to the rank of brigadier general on January 3, 1966. Garretson served in this capacity until April that year, when he was appointed director of information at Headquarters Marine Corps. While in this capacity, he was responsible for the Public relations of the Marine Corps until August 1968. He received his third Legion of Merit for his service in this assignment.

He was subsequently ordered back to South Vietnam and succeeded Brigadier General William C. Chip as assistant division commander, 3rd Marine Division under Major General Raymond G. Davis. Garretson also assumed additional duty as commanding general, Task Force Hotel, consisting of two battalions of 1st Marine Regiment and 2nd Battalion, 3rd Marines. His task force was assigned the task of maintaining the defense of Khe Sanh Combat Base and the surrounding outposts on Hills 881, 861, 950, and other prominent terrain features.

In October that year, Garretson and his Task Force Hotel took part in the Operation Scotland II, where his forces uncovered various North Vietnamese Army (PAVN) supply caches and graves but saw only minor skirmishes with the enemy. For the rest of the year, Task Force Hotel conducted search and clear operations in an area generally bounded by Route 561, Route 9, the Vietnamese Demilitarized Zone (DMZ), and the Laotian border.

On March 1, 1969, the Operation Purple Martin was launched in order to force the 246th PAVN Regiment back into the Demilitarized Zone and occupy key terrain along the southern boundary of the DMZ and then patrolling inside the southern half of the DMZ. Garretson was succeeded in command of Task Force Hotel by Brigadier general Robert B. Carney Jr. by the end of March 1969 and remained on the headquarters of 3rd Marine Division for one month, before departed for Okinawa, Japan for new assignment.

For his service as assistant division commander, 3rd Marine Division and additional duty as commanding general, Task Force Hotel, Garretson was decorated with the Navy Distinguished Service Medal and also received National Order of Vietnam and Gallantry Cross with Palm by the Government of Republic of Vietnam.

Upon his arrival to Okinawa, Garretson was appointed commanding general, Marine Corps Base, Camp S. D. Butler with additional duty as commanding general, Marine Corps Bases (Forward). While in this capacity, he was responsible for several Marine Corps installations on Okinawa, which served as training and replacements centers for combat units in South Vietnam.

In September 1969, Garretson was ordered back to the United States and assumed duty as deputy commander, Camp Pendleton, California under Major General George S. Bowman Jr. While in this capacity, he was co-responsible for demobilization of troops returning from Vietnam and training of replacements. He remained in that assignment until June 30, 1970, when he retired after 30 years of active service.

== Retirement ==
Following his retirement, Garretson settled in San Diego, California, and was active in the Navy-Marine Corps Relief Society. He was also active in the Marine Corps Oral History Program and received a Certificate of Appreciation from the Commandant of the Marine Corps, Paul X. Kelley in June 1986.

Brigadier General Frank E. Garretson died of renal failure after three weeks of illness on January 23, 2006, aged 87, at his home in San Diego. He was buried with full military honors at Fort Rosecrans National Cemetery beside his wife Cecily, who died in July 2002. They had together three children: daughters Sarah and Cecily; and son John, who served in the Navy Medical Corps and retired as captain, USN.

== Decorations ==
Here is the ribbon bar of Brigadier General Garretson:

1st Row	Navy Cross		Navy Distinguished Service Medal	Legion of Merit with two 5/16" Gold Stars and Combat "V"
2nd Row	Bronze Star Medal with Combat "V"	Purple Heart with one 5/16" Gold Star	Navy Presidential Unit Citation with one star	American Defense Service Medal
3rd Row	American Campaign Medal	Asiatic-Pacific Campaign Medal with four 3/16 inch service stars	World War II Victory Medal	National Defense Service Medal with one star
4th Row	Korean Service Medal with one silver 3/16 inch service star	Vietnam Service Medal with two bronze 3/16 inch service stars	National Order of Vietnam, 5th Class	Vietnam Gallantry Cross with Palm
5th Row	United Nations Korea Medal	Republic of Korea Presidential Unit Citation	Vietnam Gallantry Cross Unit Citation	Vietnam Campaign Medal

== See also ==
- 24th Marine Regiment

Military offices
Preceded by Arthur H. Adams	Director of Information, Headquarters Marine Corps; April 1966 - August 1968	Succeeded by Jay W. Hubbard
