= Herman Poggemeyer Jr. =

U.S. Marine Corps Major General

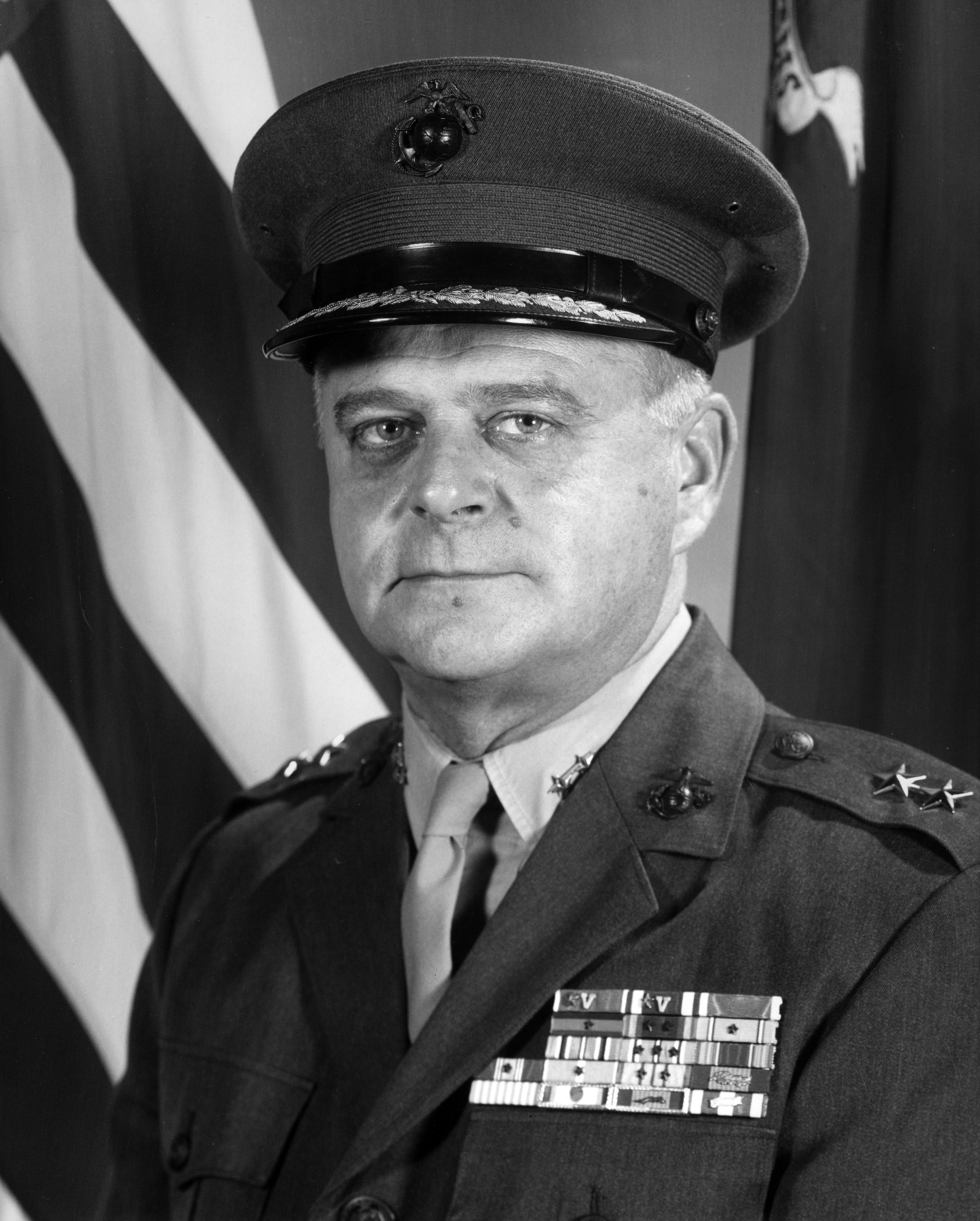
- MG Herman Poggemeyer Jr., USMC
- Born: April 22, 1919; Leavenworth, Kansas, US
- Died: April 2, 2007 (aged 87); Jacksonville, North Carolina, US
- Military career
- Allegiance: United States
- Branch: United States Marine Corps
- Service years: 1942–1977
- Rank: Major general
- Service number: 0-10954
- Commands: Camp Lejeune; III Marine Amphibious Force; Camp Pendleton; 10th Marine Regiment
- Conflicts: World War II: Bougainville Campaign; Recapture of Guam; Korean War: Jamestown Line; Vietnam War: Operation Colorado; Operation Desoto; Operation Union
- Awards: Legion of Merit (3); Purple Heart; Navy Commendation Medal (2)

Herman Poggemeyer Jr. (April 22, 1919 – April 2, 2007) was a decorated officer in the United States Marine Corps with the rank of major general. A veteran of three wars, he was severely wounded during the Recapture of Guam in July 1944. Poggemeyer later distinguished himself during Korean War and Vietnam and reached the general's rank in early 1970s. He completed his career as commanding general, Marine Corps Base Camp Lejeune.

== Early life and World War II ==
Poggemeyer was born on April 22, 1919, in Leavenworth, Kansas, as the son of Herman H. Poggemeyer and his wife Dorcas E. Thompson. His father was a veteran of World War I and operated a jewelry store in Leavenworth, where Herman worked as a young boy. Herman attended the local high school and following the graduation, he enrolled in the Baker University in Baldwin, Kansas. He left the university in the summer of 1938 in order to accept an appointment to the United States Naval Academy at Annapolis, Maryland. During his time at the academy, Poggemeyer was active on the football team and also was a member of the academy magazine, The Log.

He graduated on June 19, 1942, with a bachelor's degree and was commissioned as a second lieutenant in the Marine Corps. He was subsequently ordered to the Officer Candidates School at Quantico where he completed the Platoon Leaders Class three months later. Following completion of the course, Poggemeyer was ordered to the Pacific area, where he was promoted to the rank of first lieutenant in January 1943. He later took part in the Bougainville Campaign in the Northern Solomons and following the reactivation of 4th Marine Regiment on Guadalcanal in February 1944, he was attached to the Pack Howitzer Battalion as a reconnaissance officer.

Poggemeyer was promoted to captain in April 1944 and assumed command of Battery C. While in this capacity he took part in the Recapture of Guam at the end of July 1944 and was wounded on July 26. Poggemeyer was evacuated to the United States and following the treatment, he was attached to the Marine Barracks Klamath Falls, Oregon which served as the treatment barracks for tropical diseases. He was decorated with the Purple Heart for his wounds sustained at Guam.

== Korea and postwar service ==
Poggemeyer remained there until March 1946 and subsequently was attached to the Artillery Section, Plans and Policies Branch at Headquarters Marine Corps under Brigadier General Gerald C. Thomas. He was ordered for instruction at the Army Field Artillery School at Fort Sill, Oklahoma in early 1948 and completed the advanced field artillery officers course in July that year. Poggemeyer was then ordered back to Guam, where he was attached to the 1st Provisional Marine Brigade under Brigadier General Edward A. Craig and served as battery commander with 1st Provisional Artillery Battalion.

He was promoted to the rank of major in January 1950 and returned to the United States for duty as officer instructor and executive officer of the Navy ROTC unit at University of Kansas. Poggemeyer served in this capacity until June 1953, when he returned to Korea for duty as an executive officer, 2nd Battalion, 11th Marine Artillery Regiment. The Eleventh Marines served as the main artillery component of 1st Marine Division and its activity consisted of supporting of patrols, fired propaganda leaflets and counterbattery fire during the defense of the marine outposts on the main line of resistance.

When the Armistice was signed on July 27, 1953, the 11th Marines moved to Incheon, where it trained and undertook peacetime garrison duty. Poggemeyer was appointed assistant regimental training officer under Colonel Lewis J. Fields. He remained in that capacity until April 1954 and received the Navy Commendation Medal with Combat "V" for his service in Korea.

Poggemeyer returned to the United States in May 1954 and assumed duties as an artillery instructor within Marine Corps Educational Center at Quantico, Virginia. While in this capacity, he was promoted to the rank of lieutenant colonel in December of that year.

In June 1956, Poggemeyer was attached to the senior course at Amphibious Warfare School Quantico, which he completed one year later. He was subsequently appointed project officer and chief of the research division at the headquarters of the Armed Forces Special Weapons Project in Washington, D.C. Within this agency of Department of Defense, he served under Major General Alvin Luedecke and took part in the maintenance, storage, surveillance, security and handling of nuclear weapons. Poggemeyer served in this capacity until July 1960 and received his second Navy Commendation Medal. While in Washington, he also attended George Washington University, where he earned a Master of Science degree in engineering administration. Poggemeyer was then ordered to the Maxwell Air Force Base, where attended Air War College in June 1961.

Following his graduation, Poggemeyer then went to London, England, where he served as an assistant naval attache with the American Embassy until September 1964. Meanwhile, he was promoted to the rank of colonel in July 1963.

== Vietnam war ==
Upon his return to the States, Poggemeyer was ordered to Camp Lejeune, North Carolina and appointed Inspector of 2nd Marine Division under Major General William J. Van Ryzin. He then served as commanding officer of 10th Marine Artillery Regiment from February 1965 to May 1966, until he received orders for deployment to South Vietnam.

He arrived to Da Nang on June 25, 1966, and assumed duties as assistant chief of staff for operations, 1st Marine Division under his old superior from Korean War, Major General Lewis J. Fields. During his tenure with the 1st Division, he took part in the planning of Operations Colorado, Desoto and Union and received the Legion of Merit with Combat "V" for his service. He was also decorated with Vietnam Gallantry Cross with Palm.

Poggemeyer was relieved on June 1, 1967, and assumed duties as assistant chief of staff for operations, Fleet Marine Force, Pacific on Hawaii under Lieutenant General Victor H. Krulak. He served in this capacity until his promotion to brigadier general on March 1, 1968. Poggemeyer was subsequently ordered to Washington, D.C., and appointed deputy assistant chief of staff for logistics (G-4) at Headquarters Marine Corps under his old superior, Major General William J. Van Ryzin. For his service with Fleet Marine Force, Pacific, Poggemeyer was decorated with his second Legion of Merit.

Following Van Ryzin's promotion and detachment in June 1970, Poggemeyer assumed the capacity of assistant chief of staff for logistics and was responsible for the planning of budget for logistics for all marine forces and its advocating before the congressional committee on appropriations. While in this capacity, he was promoted to major general on September 1, 1970, and received his third Legion of Merit at the end of his tenure in August 1971.

He was subsequently ordered to the Camp Pendleton, California for duty as commanding general of the base and was responsible for the training of the troops until the end of December 1973. Poggemeyer was subsequently sent to Okinawa, Japan where he assumed command of III Marine Amphibious Force. While in this capacity, his unit consisted of 3rd Marine Division, 1st Marine Aircraft Wing and 9th Marine Amphibious Brigade and was responsible for the defense of Far East area. Poggemeyer also witnessed the decline of South Vietnam during the final phase of Vietnam War.

Poggemeyer was ordered back to the United States in December 1974 and appointed deputy chief of staff to the commander in chief, Atlantic Fleet, Admiral Ralph W. Cousins. He served at the headquarters at Norfolk, Virginia, until August 1975, when he assumed duty as commanding general at Marine Corps Base Camp Lejeune, North Carolina. Poggemeyer was responsible for the training of the troops until his retirement on July 1, 1977, after 35 years of active service.

Poggemeyer died on April 2, 2007, in Jacksonville, North Carolina, and is interred at Coastal Carolina State Veterans Cemetery. His wife, Claudine G. Poggemeyer, died four months later in December 2007. They had two sons, Frederick Poggemeyer of Dallas, Texas, and Herman (Dutch) Poggemeyer III.

== Decorations ==
A complete list of the general's medals and decorations include:

1st Row	Legion of Merit with Combat "V" and two 5/16" Gold Stars			
2nd Row	Navy Commendation Medal with Combat "V" and one 5/16" Gold Star	Purple Heart	Navy Presidential Unit Citation with one star	Navy Unit Commendation with two stars
3rd Row	American Defense Service Medal with clasp	American Campaign Medal	Asiatic-Pacific Campaign Medal with three 3/16 inch bronze service stars	World War II Victory Medal
4th Row	National Defense Service Medal with one star	Korean Service Medal with one 3/16 inch service star	Vietnam Service Medal with two 3/16 inch bronze service stars	Vietnam Gallantry Cross with Palm
5th Row	United Nations Korea Medal	Republic of Korea Presidential Unit Citation	Vietnam Gallantry Cross Unit Citation	Vietnam Campaign Medal

== See also ==
- Armed Forces Special Weapons Project
- Manhattan Project

Military offices
Preceded by Michael P. Ryan	Commanding General, III Marine Amphibious Force; December 31, 1973 – December 30, 1974	Succeeded by Carl W. Hoffman
Preceded by George S. Bowman Jr.	Commanding General, Camp Pendleton; September 1971 – November 1973	Succeeded by Robert L. Nichols
