= Herman Garretson =

American football and basketball coach (1890–1972)

Biographical details
- Born: June 26, 1890; Jackson Township, Henry County, Iowa, U.S.
- Died: December 8, 1972 (aged 82); Pasadena, California, U.S.

Playing career

Football
- 1914–1915: Iowa

Track
- 1914–1916: Iowa
- Position: Fullback (football)

Coaching career (HC unless noted)

Football
- 1916: Parsons
- 1921–1922: Iowa Wesleyan

Basketball
- 1921–1923: Iowa Wesleyan

Head coaching record
- Overall: 18–8 (basketball)

Herman John Garretson (June 26, 1890 – December 8, 1972) was an American football and basketball coach. He served as the head football coach at Parsons College in Fairfield, Iowa in 1916 and at Iowa Wesleyan College in Mount Pleasant, Iowa from 1921 to 1922. Garretson was also the head basketball coach at Iowa Wesleyan from 1921 to 1923, compiling a record of 18–8.

Herman Garretson was born in Iowa and had a twin brother, Howard. He was married twice, first to Marion Scott Becker with whom he had three sons: Frank, Herman Jr. and Ronald. His oldest son, Frank E. Garretson, served in the Marine Corps during World War II and was decorated with the Navy Cross during the combats in Pacific. He remained in the Marines and retired as Brigadier general. Herman's second wife was Helen Huston.
