= Marine Military Academy =

Private college preparatory academy in Harlingen, TX, US

Location
- 320 Iwo Jima Boulevard; Harlingen, Texas; United States; 26.225139°N 97.666472°W

Information
- Type: Military school, boarding, prep school
- Established: 1965
- President: Colonel Christopher S. Dowling
- Staff: 16 (military)
- Faculty: 26
- Enrollment: 250-275
- Average class size: 7
- Campus size: 142 acres (0.57 km^{2})
- Colors: Scarlet and gold
- Song: Marine Hymn
- Athletics: Baseball, basketball, boxing, cross country, drill team, football, golf, jiu jitsu, rifle team, soccer, swimming, tennis, track and field, weightlifting, wrestling
- Mascot: English Bulldog
- Website: www.mma-tx.org

The Marine Military Academy (MMA) is a private college preparatory academy located in Harlingen, Texas, US, offering a curriculum for boys in grades 7–12 plus one year of post-graduate study. The school was founded in 1965. Its traditions and ideals are inspired by the United States Marine Corps (USMC), but the school is not affiliated with the USMC except through its Junior ROTC program.

The academy is situated on the site of the former Harlingen Army Airfield, established in 1941. After closing, the field was re-opened in 1952 as the Harlingen Air Force Base which closed in the early 1960s. Since opening its doors as the Marine Military Academy most of the original buildings have been replaced with modern facilities. The adjacent runways became the Valley International Airport.

== Academics ==
Courses offered include regular high school classes as well as honors courses, Advanced Placement authorized courses and dual enrollment courses for which college credit may be earned. Most courses are taught year-long. In a 1976 interview, Instructor Sgt. Jim Morton claimed that MMA was "twice as strict as any other military school."

The school has summer programs including a four-week bootcamp-style summer camp for boys 13–17, as well as ESL classes for foreign students.

== Athletics ==
All cadets are required to participate in an extracurricular activity. Athletic activities at the school include jiu jitsu, boxing, baseball, football, tennis, soccer, raiders, track, and golf.

== In the news ==
After a cadet had his throat slit in his room in 1997, reports of violence, hazing, and extensive use of drugs and alcohol among students spread throughout various media. Enrollment declined by 50% in the year afterward, and the head of the school retired.

== Corps of cadets ==
The Marine Military Academy established one of the first Marine Corps Junior Reserve Officers' Training Corps (MCJROTC) in the nation. All cadets are members of the MCJROTC unit, unless they fail to qualify for full membership because of age or citizenship. In this case they receive the training as associate members.

=== Rank structure ===
The cadet rank structure is based on the United States Marine Corps rank and billet system, with the addition of "Cadet" before the title.

Eighth grade students cannot advance beyond Cadet Lance Corporal, and freshmen cannot exceed the rank of Cadet Corporal. However, eighth graders and freshmen more often serve as non-rates, those ranks up to c/Lance Corporal who are not non-commissioned officers. As a sophomore, a cadet may be promoted to an NCO rank. Juniors make up most of the academy's staff NCOs.

Seniors are generally promoted to officer rank. They hold positions of command responsibility, as Platoon Commanders, Company Executive Officers, Company Commanders, Battalion Executive Officers, and Battalion Commanders. There are also many other Battalion Staff and Company Staff positions available for seniors not in billets of command.

Officer insignia										
Officer rank	c/Colonel	c/Lieutenant Colonel	c/Major	c/Captain	c/1st Lieutenant	c/2nd Lieutenant				
Enlisted insignia									(no insignia)	(no insignia)
Enlisted rank	c/Sergeant Major	c/First Sergeant	c/Gunnery Sergeant	c/Staff Sergeant	c/Sergeant	c/Corporal	c/Lance Corporal	c/PFC	c/Private	Plebe

== Iwo Jima monument ==
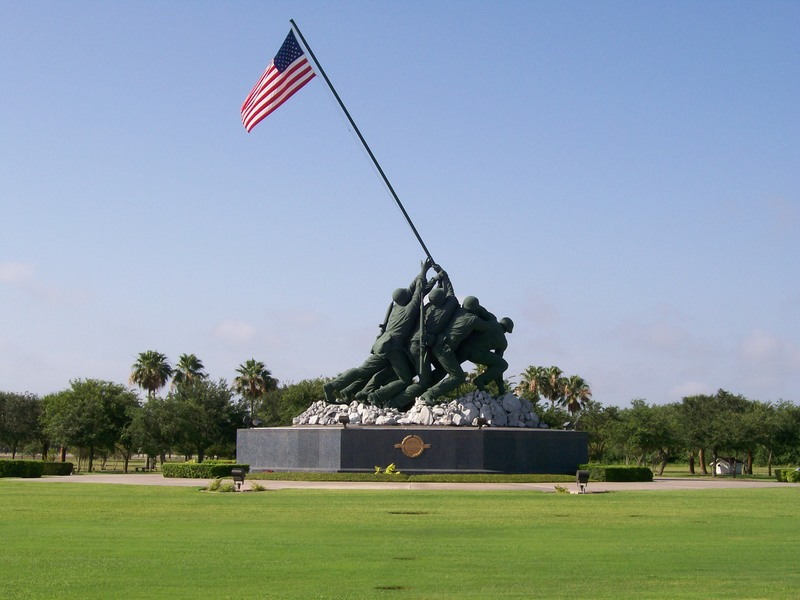
Iwo Jima Monument (1982)

The Iwo Jima monument, located on the Marine Military Academy grounds, is the original model, a creation of Felix de Weldon, and was used for the casting of the monument erected at Arlington National Cemetery. After completion of the monument, this sculpture was placed in storage until the early 1980s when its creator donated it to the Marine Military Academy. Donations were collected to fund the transport and reassembly of the monument, which was supervised by de Weldon. On April 16, 1982, the monument was officially dedicated. The Marine Military Academy is also the final resting place of Corporal Harlon Block, formerly a resident of Weslaco, Texas, one of the Marines immortalized in the famous photo of the flag-raising on Iwo Jima from which the sculpture is modeled.

== Notable alumni ==
- George S. Bowman Jr., Major General in the Marine Corps, Superintendent of the Academy 1972–1979
- Dale Hellestrae, former NFL player
- Edward H. Hurst, Brigadier General in the Marine Corps, Superintendent of the Academy 1968–1972
- Wayne Rollings, past President of the academy
- Josh Rushing, journalist (attended a summer program)
- Walter Stauffer McIlhenny, Brigadier General in the Marine Corps

== See also ==
- Peacock Military Academy
- TMI Episcopal
- Texas Marine Corps
