= Jacob E. Glick =

American Marine Corp Brigadier General (1920–2011)

Jacob Ezra Glick
- Born: February 12, 1920; Burlington, Iowa
- Died: August 24, 2011 (aged 91); Fort Belvoir, Virginia
- Burial place: Arlington National Cemetery
- Military career
- Allegiance: United States of America
- Branch: United States Marine Corps
- Service years: 1941–1971
- Rank: Brigadier general
- Nickname: Jake
- Commands: 9th Marine Amphibious Brigade
- Conflicts: World War II; Korean War; Vietnam War: Battle of Khe Sanh

Jacob E. Glick was a United States Marine Corps Brigadier General who served in the Vietnam War.

== Early life and education ==
He was born on 12 February 1920, in Burlington, Iowa.

== Military career ==
=== World War II ===
He graduated from the United States Naval Academy in 1941.

=== Vietnam War ===
Glick served as commander of the 9th Marine Amphibious Brigade on Okinawa.

Glick arrived in South Vietnam in January 1968 to serve as deputy commander of the 3rd Marine Division, together with BG Carl W. Hoffman. Glick assumed command of Phu Bai Combat Base with responsibility for moving the Division's rear elements to Quảng Trị Combat Base. In mid-April 1968 he was ordered to Khe Sanh Combat Base to assume command of the forces located there which would be designated Task Force Glick with responsibility for Operation Scotland II. Glick would pass command of the base to Hoffman at the end of April.

Glick later served as operations officer of the III Marine Amphibious Force.

== Later life ==
Glick retired from the Marines on 1 July 1971. In retirement he became the head of membership development for the Military Officers Association of America.

He died on 24 August 2011.

== Military awards ==
BGen Glick's decorations, awards, and badges include, among others:
