= Operation Scotland II =

Part of the Vietnam War (1968–1969)

- Part of the Vietnam War
Date	15 April 1968 – 28 February 1969
Location	northwest Quảng Trị Province, South Vietnam 16.579°N 106.753°E
Result	U.S. operational success

Belligerents
United States	North Vietnam

Commanders and leaders
MG Rathvon M. Tompkins; MG Raymond G. Davis; BG Jacob E. Glick; BG Carl W. Hoffman; BG William C. Chip; BG Frank E. Garretson; Col. Stanley S. Hughes	

Units involved
1st Battalion, 1st Marines; 2nd Battalion, 1st Marines; 3d Marine Regiment; 4th Marine Regiment; 9th Marine Regiment; 26th Marine Regiment	308th Infantry Division

Casualties and losses
435 killed	U.S. body count: 3,304 killed

Operation Scotland II was a U.S. Marine Corps security operation that took place in northwest Quảng Trị Province from 15 April 1968 to 28 February 1969.

== Background ==
At 08:00 on 15 April, following the relief of Khe Sanh Combat Base in Operation Pegasus the 3rd Marine Division resumed responsibility for Khe Sanh Combat Base from the 1st Cavalry Division and Operation Scotland II began with the Marines seeking out the People's Army of Vietnam (PAVN) forces on the Khe Sanh plateau and across the operational area which comprised the western third of Quảng Trị Province.

== Operation ==
=== April 1968 ===
3rd Marine Division commander MG Rathvon M. Tompkins sent the division deputy commander BG Jacob E. Glick to Khe Sanh base to take control of the forces there comprising the 1st Marine Regiment which was relieving the 26th Marine Regiment, the 1st Battalion, 9th Marines and the 2nd Brigade, 1st Cavalry Division, this force was designated Task Force Glick. The Task Force and Regimental command posts and 2nd Battalion, 1st Marines were located at the base, 1st Battalion, 1st Marines occupied Hills 558, 861, 881 South and 950, the 2nd Battalion, 3rd Marines provided security along Route 9 and the 3rd Battalion, 4th Marines was deployed to secure Hill 689 (16.643°N 106.689°E).

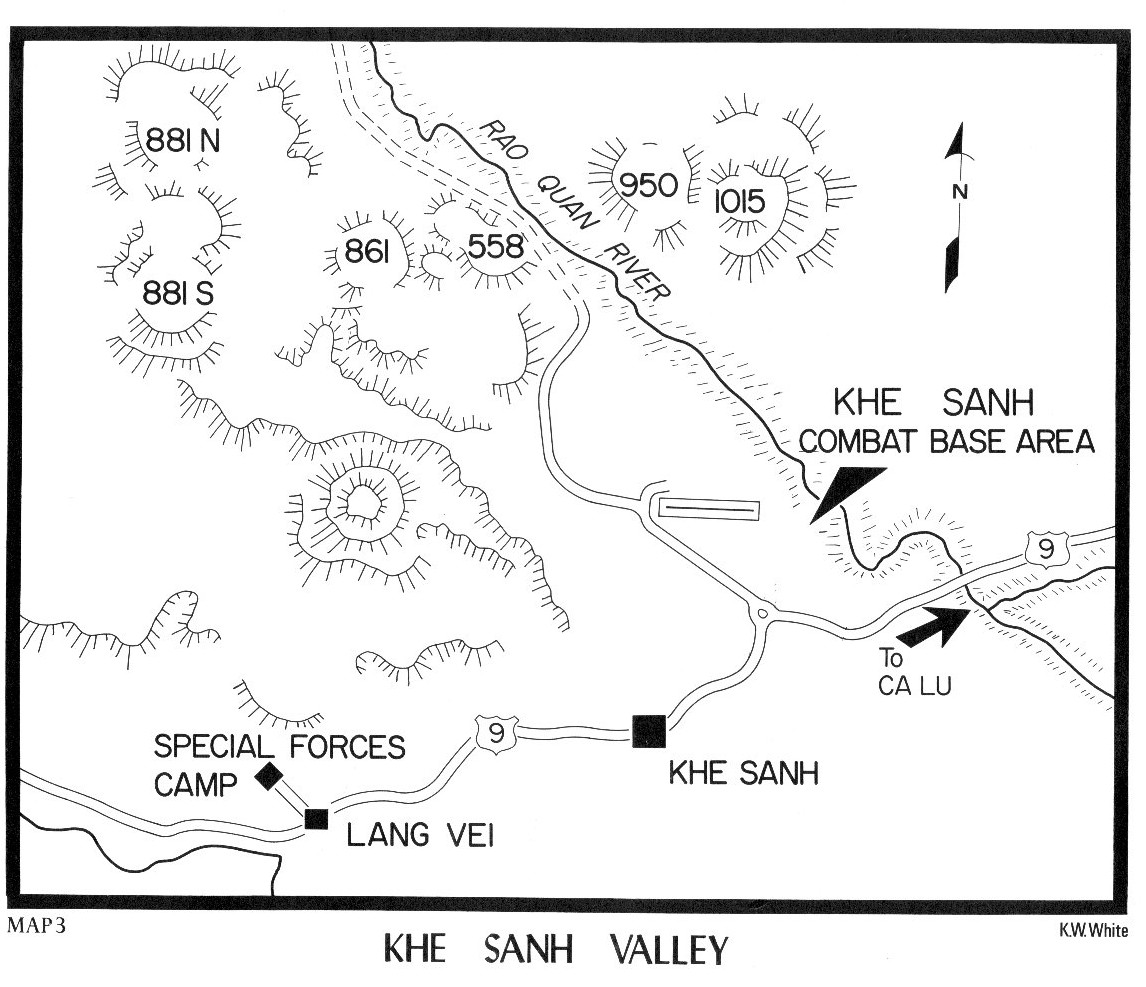
Map showing location of U.S. positions around Khe Sanh

On 16 April 1968, Company A 1st Battalion, 9th Marines began a patrol southwest of Hill 689, when it was ambushed by PAVN soldiers in bunkers concealed in the thick vegetation. Two more companies from 1/9 Marines were dispatched to save them, but they became ensnarled in this confusing battle and were unable to disengage until the early morning of 17 April. Casualties amounted to 38 Marines and three Navy Corpsmen killed, three missing and 32 wounded. The battalion commander Lieutenant Colonel John Cahill was relieved of duty.

On 19 April the PAVN ambushed a convoy of the 1st Battalion, 11th Marines killing three Marines. Following this ambush 1st Marine Regiment commander Col. Stanley S. Hughes restricted traffic on Route 9 and formed a Provisional Mechanized Company combining an anti-tank company, two infantry platoons and elements of the 3rd Tank Battalion to improve road security.

At the end of April BG Carl W. Hoffman replaced Glick and the force was briefly designated Task Force Hoffman but subsequently Task Force Hotel based on the radio callsign.

=== May 1968 ===
On 14 May the PAVN ambushed a supply convoy 1 km north of Route 9, the 2/3 Marines was sent to relieve the convoy and pursued the PAVN into a bunker complex killing 74 PAVN for the loss of seven Marines. On 17 May Company H, 2/1 Marines pursued several PAVN into a bunker complex killing 52 PAVN for the loss of six Marines. From 17 to 19 May, the 3/4 Marines patrolling the ridgeline between Hills 552 (16.637°N 106.708°E) and 689 killed 84 PAVN and captured five.

At 04:00 on 19 May, a PAVN platoon attacked Company H 2/3 Marines position on Route 9 southeast of Khe Sanh killing three Marines for the loss of eight dead. Simultaneously Company I 3/4 Marines on Hill 552 was hit by PAVN mortar fire, at dawn the Marines attacked the PAVN position killing 42 and capturing four. At 07:10 a platoon from Company F 2/1 Marines supported by two tanks on a road sweep operation from Khe Sanh base towards Route 9 was ambushed, the Marines attempted to assault the PAVN positions but were repulsed. The remainder of Company F was sent to reinforce the platoon but the Marines attack was again repulsed, Company G was then sent to reinforce Company F and napalm strikes were called in close to the Marine lines forcing the PAVN to retreat. Marine losses were eight dead while PAVN losses were 113 killed and three captured. Given the increased PAVN activity around the base, in late May III Marine Amphibious Force (III MAF) ordered 3rd Battalion, 9th Marines to reinforce the units in the area.

On 24 May, Company G 2/3 Marines engaged a PAVN company in bunkers on a ridge overlooking Route 9, 4 km southeast of the base known as "Foxtrot Ridge" (16.6196°N 106.7568°E). Air and artillery strikes were called in on the bunkers but the Marine attack was repulsed so further gunship and artillery strikes were called in which allowed the Marines to capture the position by 20:15 for the loss of 15 Marines killed, while the PAVN had lost 58 dead. Company G was reinforced by Companies E and F and dug into positions 700m apart along the ridgeline. At 02:45 on 28 May Company F detected PAVN movement outside their perimeter and artillery strikes were called in. Three PAVN armed with Satchel charges then attacked a listening post killing themselves and three Marines, this action started a battalion sized attack on Company F's positions. The PAVN forced the 1st Platoon from its position and overran the company's 60 mm mortar position. At 03:30 Company F was hit by PAVN 130 mm artillery fire from across the Vietnamese Demilitarized Zone (DMZ). At 04:15 an AC-47 Spooky gunship and a flareship arrived over the battle and were engaged by PAVN antiaircraft fire. The PAVN made repeated attacks to try to overrun the Marine positions supported by continuous RPG-2 fire. At 07:00 a napalm strike against PAVN reinforcements killed over 30 PAVN and started a wildfire that forced Company F from its fighting positions. Company F regained its positions as the fire died down and the PAVN began to disengage. At 11:50 Company E arrived to reinforce Company F and overran a PAVN RPG position. The Marines lost 13 dead while the PAVN lost 230 killed.

In response to the renewed PAVN artillery fire, on 30 May, four M107s and four M110s were deployed to Khe Sanh base from Camp Carroll and these engaged in a 48-hour artillery barrage named Operation Drumfire II against suspected PAVN artillery positions in the Co Roc mountain range (16.561°N 106.632°E), with little noticeable effect.

At 04:00 on 31 May the PAVN supported by artillery fire attacked Company E 2/3 Marines on Foxtrot Ridge but were beaten back. At 08:50 Company B 1/1 Marines was ambushed as it moved to support Company E, they were then reinforced by Company G 2/3 Marines and Company E 2/1 Marines who overran the PAVN positions. The Marines lost 32 dead while the PAVN lost 136 killed.

=== June 1968 ===
From 2 to 19 June Task Force Hotel conducted Operation Robin in the "Vietnam Salient" 15 km south of Route 9 resulting in 65 Marines killed and 635 PAVN killed and 48 captured.

From 19 June Task Force Hotel conducted Operation Charlie, the evacuation and destruction of the Khe Sanh Combat Base. Useful equipment was withdrawn or destroyed. At 03:25 on 1 July, the PAVN attacked a position held by 3rd Battalion, 4th Marines 3 km southeast of the base. The battle continued until late afternoon when the PAVN disengaged leaving over 200 dead, while the defending Marines lost two men. The PAVN kept up artillery and mortar fire on Marine positions around the base. At 20:00 on 5 July Khe Sanh Combat Base was officially closed and on 6 July Operation Charlie concluded. The 1/1 Marines remained around Hill 689 to recover the remains of seven Marines killed in the earlier fighting and another 11 Marines and 89 PAVN soldiers were killed, before the 1/1 Marines recovered the dead and withdrew from the area on 11 July.

The abandonment of Khe Sanh base was part of a change in U.S. strategy following the replacement of General William Westmoreland as COMUSMACV by General Creighton Abrams and the increased availability of helicopters saw the Marines move away from being tied to defending large bases along the DMZ and refocussing on mobile operations to engage PAVN units and their logistics network.

=== August–October 1968 ===
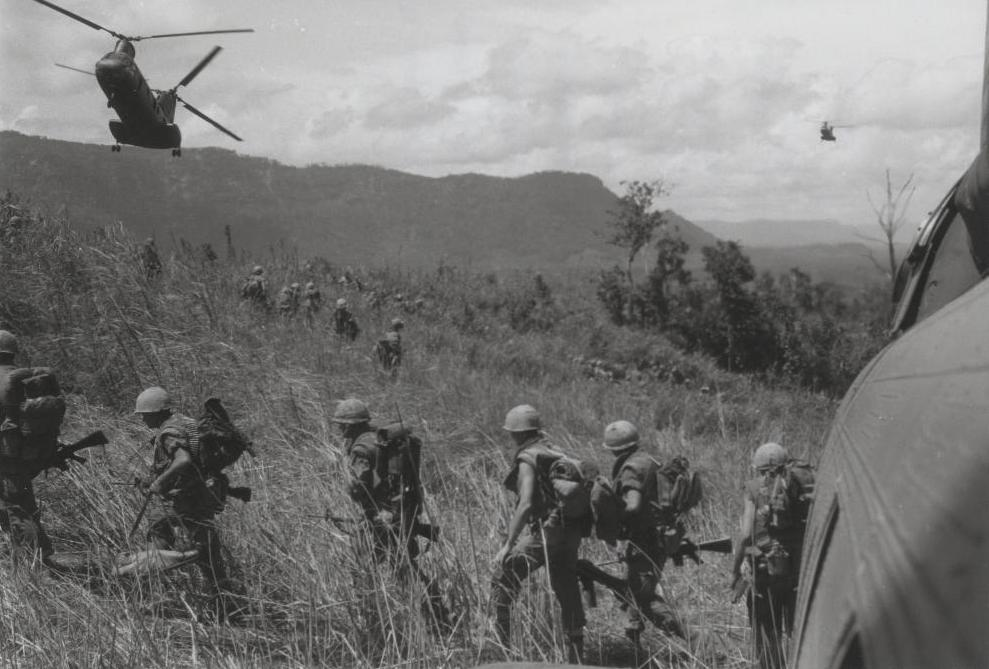
2/4 Marines offload from HMM-262 CH-46s near Lang Vei

August–September 1968 saw little activity in the Scotland II area as the PAVN concentrated their activity further east in the Lancaster II and Kentucky area of operations and poor weather limited activities. PAVN units observed in the area were engaged by fire on numerous occasions but with unclear results. On 17 September PAVN units were observed near the site of the abandoned Khe Sanh base and air and artillery strikes were ordered in with negligible results.

On 5 October Task Force Hotel commander BG Frank E. Garretson (who had assumed the command in August) commenced a new operation west of Khe Sanh, landing the 3/4 Marines and 2/4 Marines north and south of the abandoned Lang Vei camp and then sweeping east along Route 9. The operation uncovered various PAVN supply caches and graves but saw only minor skirmishes with the PAVN. 2/4 Marines arrived at Vandegrift Combat Base on 16 October and left the operation, while the 3/4 Marines, joined by 3/9 Marines on 24 October, continued to sweep the hills north of Route 9 until the end of October with limited results.

In late October 2/9 Marines was landed in the Vietnam Salient and after sweeping it they moved north to patrol the Đa Krông valley, in mid-November it was joined by the 3/9 Marines and the two battalions conducted a systematic sweep of the valley and then moving further east and south of Vandegrift.

=== November–December 1968 ===
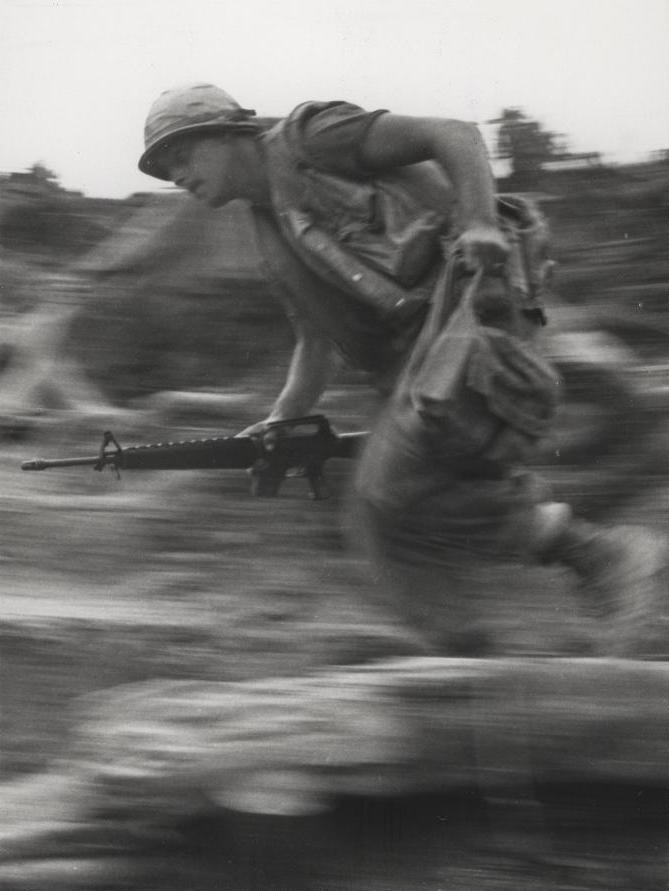
Marine from 1/4 Marines distributes ammunition during an attack on Firebase Russell, 12 December 1968

By early November Task Force Hotel controlled the following forces in the Scotland II operational area: 1/4 Marines defended and patrolled from Firebases Cates (16.6734°N 106.806°E) and Shepherd and Hills 691 (16.673°N 106.806°E) and 950; 3/4 Marines defended Firebase Gurkha (16.7094°N 106.7126°E) and patrolled the Khe Xa Bai and Song Rao Quan Valleys; and 2/4 Marines was deployed to Hill 1308 to construct Firebase Argonne approximately 10 km northwest of Khe Sanh and 2 km east of the Laotian border. On 11 November following the completion of the construction of Firebase Argonne, 1/4 Marines rotated with 2/4 Marines who then closed Firebase Shepherd.

On 21 November 3/4 Marines deployed by helicopter to reopen Landing Zone Mack and establish Landing Zone Sierra and Firebase Winchester (16.804°N 106.7876°E).

On 23 November Operation Lancaster II was terminated and the Lancaster area of operations was absorbed into the Scotland II and Kentucky operational areas.

On 24 November Company E, 2/4 Marines was landed at Firebase Winchester and then moved 1 km east to establish Firebase Russell.

On 28 November 1/9 Marines and 3/9 Marines launched Operation Dawson River to sweep the PAVN Base Area 101 and the Ba Long Valley uncovering numerous supply caches and graves but meeting limited resistance. The operation concluded on 25 December.

On 3 December 1/4 Marines established Firebase Neville on Hill 1103, approximately 15 km north of Khe Sanh and just south of the DMZ and Battery G, 3rd Battalion, 12th Marines deployed there. On 14 December Firebases Alpine, Argonne and Gurkha were closed.

On 7 December 2/4 Marines was landed on ridgelines east of LZ Mack and 3 km north of Dong Ha Mountain. On 8 December as a patrol from Company E approached Hill 208 (16.854°N 106.916°E) it was engaged by PAVN fire. The Marines were reinforced and assaulted into the PAVN position where they were caught in a crossfire and at dusk they were forced to retreat leaving three dead Marines behind. The rest of the battalion was moved to surround the PAVN while it was bombarded throughout the night, but the PAVN escaped the cordon and the Marines only found the bodies of their own dead the next morning. On 11 December Company F was searching for PAVN mortar positions on Mutter's Ridge along the southern DMZ when they became pinned down by entrenched PAVN; one of the company's platoon commanders was Lt. Robert Mueller. He earned a Bronze Star for rescuing a fallen Marine under enemy fire as well as a Purple Heart after he was wounded in the leg by enemy fire.

The Marines withdrew to evacuate their casualties and following air and artillery strikes resumed their assault on the PAVN positions. Company H moved in to attack the PAVN position from the north and also became heavily engaged but their fire eventually forced the PAVN to withdraw. Marine losses were 13 dead. On 12 December the Marines scoured the area but were denied permission to pursue the PAVN into the DMZ. Over the next two weeks 2/4 Marine searched the ridgeline but without engaging any more PAVN and on 26 December they were redeployed to the Cửa Việt Base.

=== January–February 1969 ===
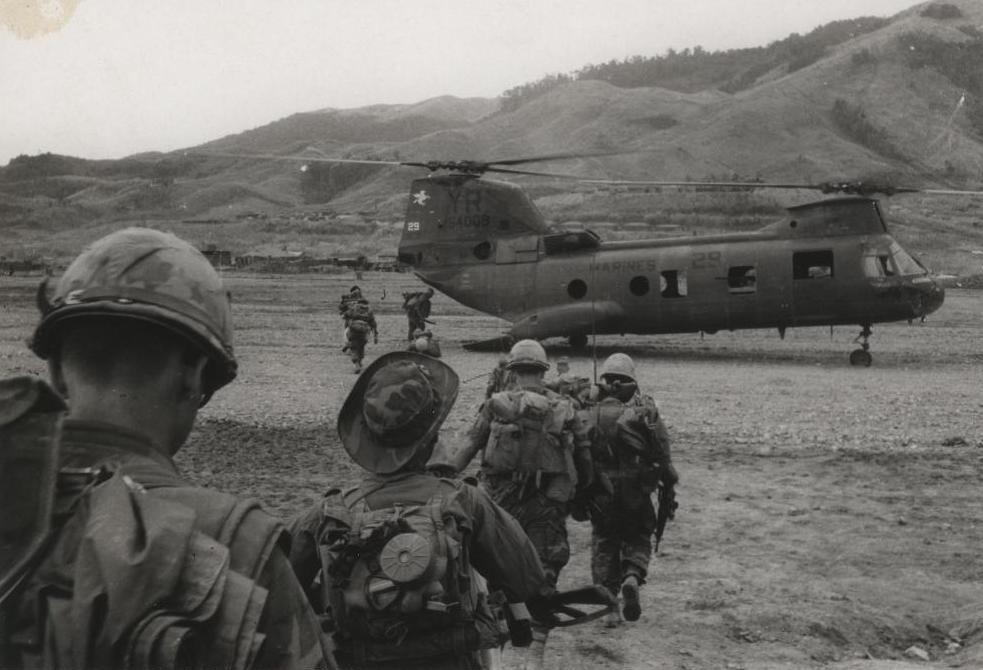
1/4 Marines move to board a CH-46 at Vandegrift Combat Base

On 31 December 1968, the 3rd Reconnaissance Battalion was landed west of the former Khe Sanh base to commence Operation Dawson River West. On 2 January 1969 the 9th Marines and the 2nd ARVN Regiment were also deployed on the Khe Sanh plateau supported by the newly established Fire Support Bases Geiger (16.674°N 106.636°E) and Smith (16.62°N 106.677°E); the three-week operation found no significant PAVN forces or supplies in the Khe Sanh area.

The PAVN generally avoided contact throughout January as the Marines conducted sweeps across the Scotland II area to try to locate the PAVN and disrupt their logistical preparations. On 10 January a large bunker complex was discovered north of Firebase Neville indicating that the PAVN were preparing for operations in the area and on 1 February elements of the 3rd Reconnaissance Battalion and 2/4 Marines swept the southern half of the DMZ north of Neville discovering further caches but without gaining any useful intelligence on PAVN plans.

In mid-January the 9th Marine Regiment began Operation Dawson River South (later renamed Operation Dewey Canyon) against the Đa Krông and A Sầu valleys.

In the early foggy morning of 25 February 1969 200 sappers from the PAVN 246th Regiment attacked Firebase Neville killing 12 Marines from Company H, 2/4 Marines and Battery G, 3/12 Marines and two Navy corpsmen for the loss of 36 PAVN dead. On the same morning the PAVN 27 Regiment attacked Firebase Russell 10 km east of Firebase Neville killing 29 Marines and Corpsmen for the loss of 25 PAVN. The PAVN remained deployed around Firebase Neville and continued to hit it with mortar fire for several more days despite air and artillery support, until swept from the area by Company G, 2/4 Marines.

== Aftermath ==
Operation Scotland II concluded on 28 February 1969 with the subordinate units remaining in place. In early April outgoing 3rd Marine Division commander MG Raymond G. Davis stated that "we totally control Quảng Trị Province."
