= Robert B. Carney Jr. =

United States Marine Corps general

Robert Bostwick Carney Jr.
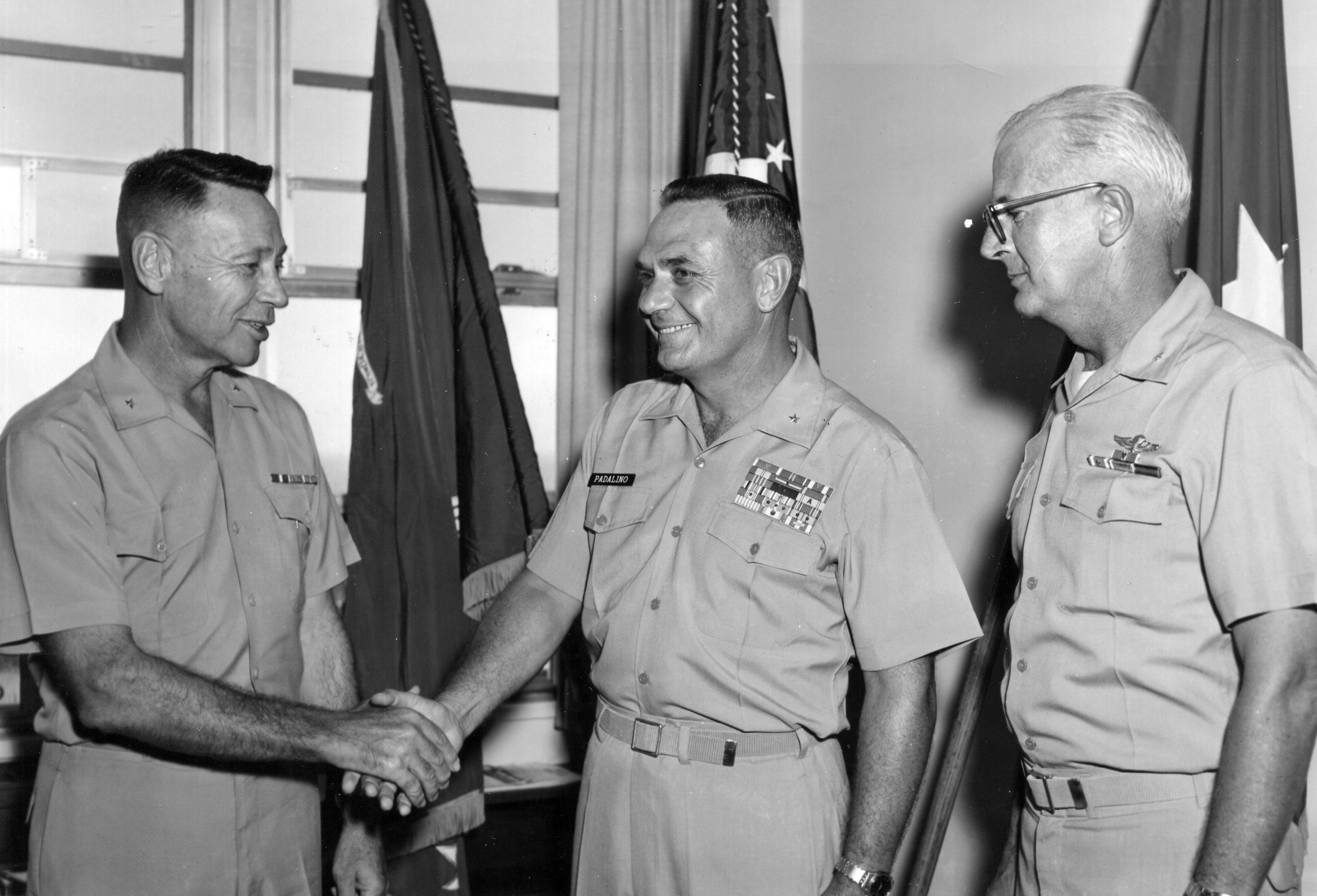
- BGen Frank E. Garretson, BGen Mauro J. Padalino and BGen Robert B. Carney Jr. in 1969
- Born: September 24, 1919; Washington, D.C., U.S.
- Died: March 9, 1983 (aged 63); Arlington, Virginia, U.S.
- Burial place: Arlington National Cemetery
- Relatives: Robert Carney (father); Richard K. Sutherland (father in law)
- Military career
- Allegiance: United States
- Branch: United States Marine Corps
- Service years: 1941–1972
- Rank: Brigadier General
- Commands: 9th Marine Amphibious Brigade
- Conflicts: World War II: Battle of Iwo Jima; Vietnam War
- Awards: Legion of Merit (2); Bronze Star Medal; Purple Heart

Robert Bostwick Carney Jr. (September 24, 1919 – March 9, 1983) was a United States Marine Corps brigadier general who served in World War II and the Vietnam War.

== Early life and education ==
Carney was born in Washington, D.C., on 24 September 1919, the son of naval officer and future admiral Robert Carney and Grace Carney. He graduated from Western High School and Dartmouth College.

== Military career ==
=== World War II ===
Carney joined the United States Marine Corps in 1941 and was commissioned in April 1942.

Carney participated in the Bougainville Campaign and was awarded the Bronze Star Medal and Purple Heart for his actions during the Battle of Iwo Jima. On Iwo Jima he led Company G of 3rd Battalion, 28th Marines, which cleared the right flank of Mount Suribachi on 22 February 1945 (D+3).

On his return from the Pacific he was stationed at Long Beach. On 19 February 1944 he was engaged to Miss Natalie Sutherland, daughter of General Richard K. Sutherland.

=== Post-World War II ===
In the early 1950s he became the U.S. Marine advisor to the Commandant of the Republic of China Marine Corps in Taiwan. In that role he helped organize the ROCMC with a structure similar to a U.S. Marine division, and he also expanded the American advisory mission to the ROCMC.

He commanded the Marine Barracks, Washington, D.C., from 1964 to 1968.

=== Vietnam War ===
Carney served as assistant division commander of the 3rd Marine Division from 8 November 1968 to 9 June 1969. From 1 April to 21 May 1969 he commanded Task Force Hotel in western Quảng Trị Province, during which time it conducted Operation Purple Martin. He subsequently commanded the 9th Marine Amphibious Brigade on Okinawa from 13 June to 7 November 1969.

== Later life ==
Carney retired from the Marine Corps in June 1972. He died on 9 March 1983 and was survived by his wife Natalie, a son and a daughter. He was buried at Arlington National Cemetery.

== Decorations ==
His decorations include the Legion of Merit (2), Bronze Star Medal and Purple Heart.

== Bibliography ==
- Smith, Charles (1988). U.S. Marines in Vietnam: High Mobility and Standdown 1969 (PDF). History and Museums Division, Headquarters, U.S. Marine Corps. ISBN 978-1494287627.
- Haynes, Fred (2008). The lions of Iwo Jima (First ed.). New York: Henry Hold & Co. p. 46. ISBN 9780805083255.
- The Editors of the Navy Times (1968). Operation victory : winning the Pacific war (First ed.). New York: G. P. Putnam's Sons. pp. 142–154.
