= Wayne Rollings =

US Marines major general

Wayne E. Rollings
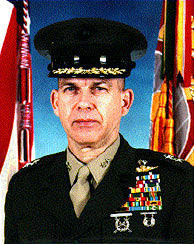
- Major General, United States Marine Corps
- Born: January 11, 1941; Orangeburg, South Carolina
- Died: January 3, 2022 (aged 80); Ocala, Florida
- Burial place: Arlington National Cemetery, Arlington, VA Section 81, Grave 379
- Military career
- Allegiance: United States of America
- Branch: United States Marine Corps
- Service years: 1960–1999
- Rank: Major General
- Commands: 3rd Marine Regiment; The Basic School; Marine Corps Bases Japan; III Marine Expeditionary Force; II Marine Expeditionary Force
- Conflicts: Vietnam War
- Awards: Navy Cross; Silver Star (2); Bronze Star; Purple Heart (2)
- Other work: President, Marine Military Academy

Major General Wayne Evan Rollings (January 11, 1941 - January 3, 2022), USMC, was Commanding General, II Marine Expeditionary Force, III Marine Expeditionary Force and a recipient of the Navy Cross.

== Early career ==
Rollings was born on January 11, 1941, in Orangeburg, South Carolina. He began his career in the Marines by enlisting in 1960. After completing recruit training at Marine Corps Recruit Depot Parris Island, he served as an infantryman in the Fleet Marine Force at Marine Corps Base Camp Lejeune, North Carolina and Okinawa, Japan. In 1963, he completed Drill Instructor School, also at Parris Island, and served there as a Drill Instructor until he completed his enlistment in 1965. Following his separation from active duty, he enlisted in the United States Marine Corps Reserve and enrolled at the University of Georgia.

In 1968, Rollings graduated with a Bachelor of Arts in history and following attendance at Officer Candidate School was commissioned as a second lieutenant. He attended The Basic School for 6 months at Marine Corps Base Quantico (a school he would later command) where new lieutenants learn the art and science of being a Marine officer. Following graduation, he served as a platoon commander in 1st Force Reconnaissance Company on a deployment to South Vietnam.

== Navy Cross ==
In Vietnam, Rollings earned the Navy's second-highest honor for valor and heroism in combat, the Navy Cross (second only to the Medal of Honor). The citation that accompanied the medal:

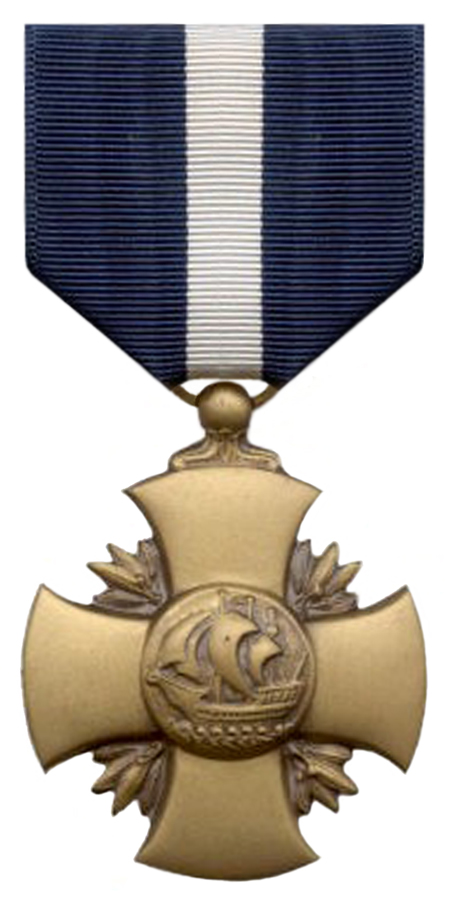
Navy Cross

The President of the United States

Takes Pleasure in Presenting
The Navy Cross
To

Wayne E. Rollings
First Lieutenant, United States Marine Corps

For Services as Set Forth in the Following Citation:

"The President of the United States takes pleasure in presenting the Navy Cross to Wayne E. Rollings (107099), First Lieutenant, U.S. Marine Corps, for extraordinary heroism on 18 September 1969 as a patrol leader with the First Force Reconnaissance Company, First Reconnaissance Battalion, FIRST Marine Division (Reinforced), Fleet Marine Force, during operations against enemy forces in the Republic of Vietnam. While First Lieutenant Rollings was leading a long-range reconnaissance patrol deep into enemy-controlled territory in Quang Nam Province, the point man spotted twelve enemy soldiers in almost hidden emplacements and immediately fired at the hostile troops. Observing that the point man's weapon had become inoperable, First Lieutenant Rollings dashed across the fire-swept terrain and positioned himself between the point man and the enemy. Although small-arms fire tore his clothing and ripped his gas mask, and fragments of an enemy grenade struck him in the face and legs, First Lieutenant Rollings continued to deliver suppressive fire, accounting for several enemy casualties and forcing the remainder of the hostile troops to withdraw. Assuming the dangerous point position, and once again faced with intense enemy fire, he charged up an enemy-held knoll in a fiercely determined assault, resulting in the complete routing of the enemy. Despite the pain of his injuries, First Lieutenant Rollings continued to expose himself to fire from the retreating enemy while he skillfully directed air strikes upon all possible routes of egress. Through his courage, dynamic leadership, and unfaltering devotion to duty, he contributed significantly to the accomplishment of his patrol's mission and upheld the highest traditions of the Marine Corps and the United States Naval Service."

== Marine Corps career ==
After returning from Vietnam in 1970, he became a rifle platoon commander and then rifle company commander in 1st Battalion, 3rd Marines while stationed at Marine Corps Air Station Kaneohe Bay, Hawaii. In 1972, he deployed again to Vietnam, serving as an infantry battalion advisor to the Republic of Vietnam Marine Division. Upon his return the next year, he attended Amphibious Warfare School and then commanded a staff platoon at The Basic School.

In 1974, he transferred to the Middle East and served a tour of duty with the United Nations Observer Team. Upon completion of that assignment, he reported to the 2d Marine Division, Marine Corps Base Camp Lejeune, North Carolina in 1975, where he was assigned as a Rifle Company Commander, and then as the Battalion Operations and Training Officer of 1st Battalion, 6th Marines. In 1977, he was reassigned to 2nd Force Reconnaissance Company where he became the Commanding Officer.

As a major, he attended the Armed Forces Staff College at Norfolk, Virginia, and upon graduation in 1980, he became the Marine Officer Instructor at the Naval Reserve Officer Training Corps at the University of South Carolina. In 1982, he returned to Marine Corps Base Quantico to serve as the Commanding Officer, Headquarters and Service Battalion, The Basic School, and later, as the Tactics Group Chief. He was promoted to lieutenant colonel in July 1983.

From 1984 to 1985, Rollings attended the National War College, in Washington, D.C., and upon graduation returned to the 2d Marine Division, where he served as the Assistant Chief of Staff, G-3, Operations Officer. He was then reassigned within the Division and served as the Commanding Officer, 3d Battalion, 4th Marines from 1986 to 1988.

Following his selection to colonel in 1988, Rollings reported to the Joint Staff at The Pentagon, for a tour as a Strategy Branch Chief, J-5. While a member of the Joint Staff, in 1989, he completed the Harvard University Senior Executive Fellows Program. In June 1991, he became the Commanding Officer of the 3rd Marine Regiment (Reinforced), 1st Marine Expeditionary Brigade, Marine Corps Air Station Kaneohe Bay, Hawaii. He advanced to brigadier general on June 28 and assumed assignment as the Commanding General, Marine Corps Base Camp Smedley D. Butler / Deputy Commanding General, Marine Corps Bases Japan, on July 14, 1993. He advanced to his present grade on February 14, 1995. He assumed his next assignment on May 26, 1995, as the Commanding General, III Marine Expeditionary Force / Commander, Marine Corps Bases Japan.

== Additional information ==
In July 1971, Rollings set the world record for sit-ups when he did 17,000 situps in seven hours and twenty-seven minutes. He later beat his own record with 40,000 consecutive sit-ups over the course of 16 hours when assigned as the Marine Officer Instructor, Naval Reserve Officer Training Corps, University of South Carolina in April 1981. He also participated in one of three combat parachute jumps conducted by Marines during the Vietnam War.

== Awards ==
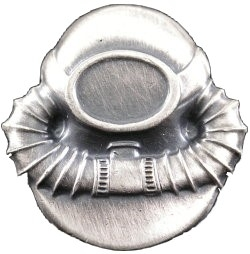

SCUBA Diver Badge; Navy Marine Corps Parachutist Badge
1st Row	Navy Cross		Silver Star w/ 1 award star	Defense Superior Service Medal
2nd Row	Bronze Star w/ valor device	Purple Heart w/ 1 award star	Meritorious Service Medal w/ 1 award star	Navy Marine Corps Commendation Medal
3rd Row	Combat Action Ribbon	Joint Meritorious Unit Award	Navy Unit Commendation	Navy Meritorious Unit Commendation
4th Row	National Defense Service Medal w/ 1 service star	Armed Forces Expeditionary Medal	Vietnam Service Medal	Navy Sea Service Deployment Ribbon
5th Row	Vietnam Gallantry Cross Unit Citation	Vietnam Civil Actions Unit Citation (First Class)	United Nations Medal	Vietnam Campaign Medal

- Note: The gold US Navy Parachute Rigger badge was worn unofficially by USMC personnel in place of the US Army parachutist badge from 1942–1963 before it officially became the Navy and Marine Corps Parachutist insignia on July 12, 1963, per Bureau of Naval Personnel Notice 1020. Members of the Marine Corps who attended jump school before 1963 were issued the silver Army parachutist badge but may be depicted wearing the gold Navy Parachute Rigger badge as it was common practice during this time period.
