= George S. Bowman Jr. =

American Major general (1911–2005)

George Shepard Bowman Jr.
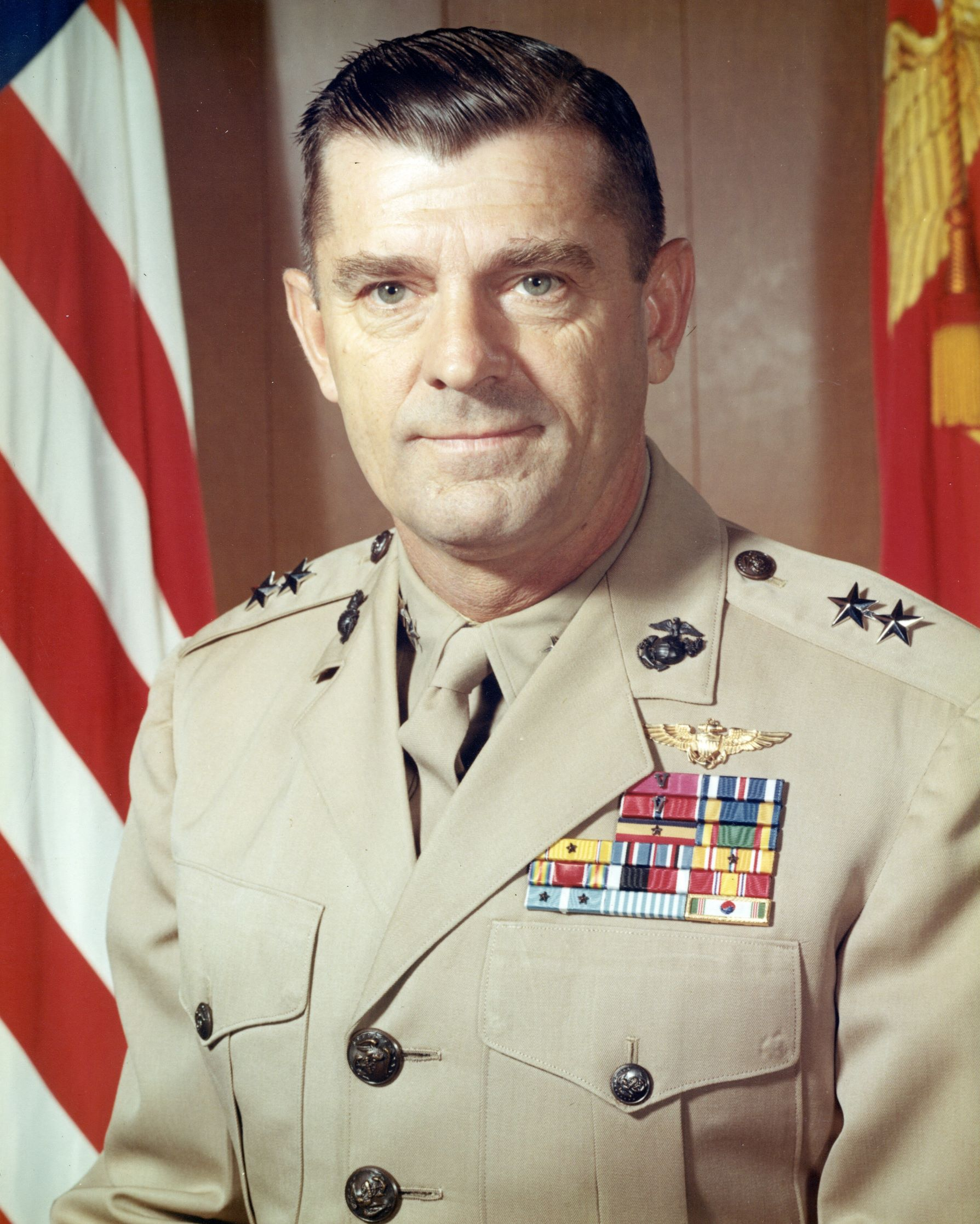
- Bowman as major general, USMC
- Born: December 24, 1911; Hammond, Louisiana, US
- Died: May 3, 2005 (aged 93); Harlingen, Texas, US
- Military career
- Allegiance: United States
- Branch: United States Marine Corps
- Service years: 1936-1972
- Rank: Major general
- Service number: 0-5314
- Commands: Camp Pendleton; 2nd Marine Aircraft Wing; Marine Aircraft Group 12; Marine Fighting Squadron 311
- Conflicts: World War II: Battle of Okinawa; Korean War: Battle for Outpost Vegas; Bombing of North Korea; Vietnam War
- Awards: Distinguished Service Medal; Distinguished Flying Cross; Legion of Merit (3); Bronze Star Medal; Air Medal
- Other work: Superintendent, Marine Military Academy

George Shepard Bowman Jr. (December 24, 1911 – May 3, 2005) was a decorated officer and Naval aviator in the United States Marine Corps. A veteran of three wars, Bowman distinguished himself several times as commander, Marine Aircraft Group 12 in Korea and later rose through the ranks to major general and commander of 2nd Marine Aircraft Wing.

During the Vietnam War, he served as deputy commander, III Marine Amphibious Force and deputy commander, XXIV Corps, before returned to the United States for his final assignment as commander, Camp Pendleton. Following his retirement from the Marines, Bowman served as superintendent, Marine Military Academy (1972–1979).

== Early career ==
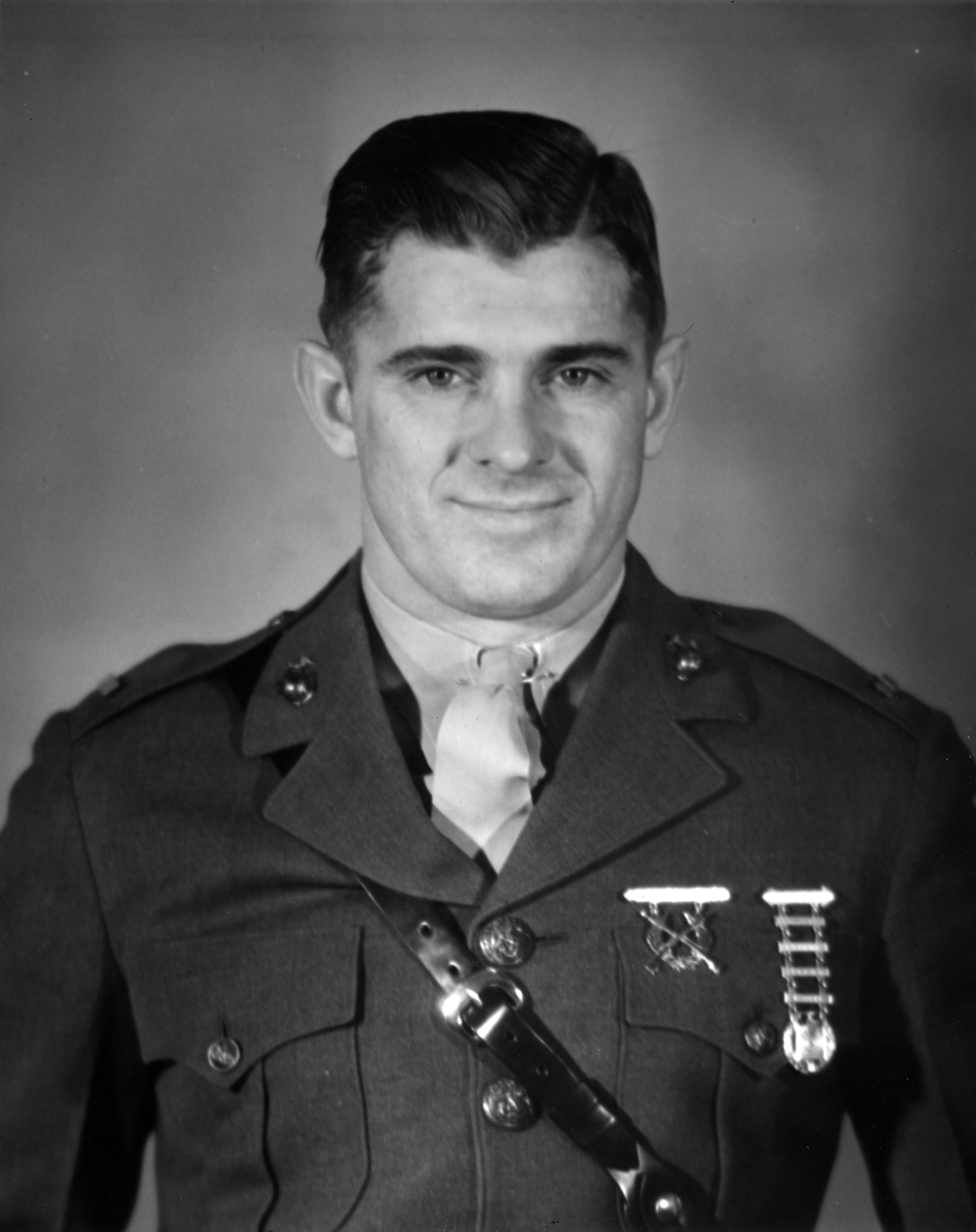
Bowman as second lieutenant in February 1939.

George S. Bowman Jr. was born on Christmas Eve of 1911 in Hammond, Louisiana, as the son of George S. Bowman and Marie Hall. He graduated from the high school there and enrolled the Louisiana State University in Baton Rouge in summer 1931. While at the university, Bowman was active in football and track and was a member of the Reserve Officer Training Corps. He was commissioned second lieutenant in the Army Reserves.

He graduated with a Bachelor of Science degree in electrical engineering in June 1936 and resigned his reserve Army commission one month later in order to accept an appointment as second lieutenant in the Marine Corps. Bowman was subsequently ordered to the Basic School at Philadelphia Navy Yard for officers instruction, which he completed in May 1937.

Bowman was then assigned to the Marine barracks at Pearl Harbor Navy Yard, Hawaii and remained there until July 1938, when he was transferred to the 6th Marine Regiment in San Diego, California. He requested for flight training in February 1939 and was ordered to the Naval Air Station Pensacola, Florida. During his instruction there, he was promoted to first lieutenant in July 1939.

In December that year, Bowman completed his training and was designated Naval Aviator. He then remained at Pensacola for next two months, before he received orders to report at Marine Barracks Quantico, Virginia for duty with Marine Fighting Squadron 111 under Major William L. McKittrick. While attached to this squadron, he participated in the prewar training on Grumman F4F Wildcats and took part in the patrols along the East Coast of the United States. Bowman was promoted to captain in October 1941.

== World War II ==
Following the United States entry into World War II in December 1941, Bowman was ordered with his squadron to San Diego and was appointed commander of Service Squadron 13 attached to the newly activated Marine Aircraft Group 13 under Colonel Thomas J. Walker. The MAG-13 was transferred to Tutuila, American Samoa one month later and Bowman assumed duty as group's operations officer.

While in this capacity, his group was responsible for the air defense of American Samoa and Bowman was promoted to the temporary rank of major in August 1942. His main duty consisted mostly of training and patrolling of American Samoa. He returned to the United States in September 1943 and joined the staff of Marine Corps Air Station Santa Barbara, California.

Bowman remained in that assignment until December 1943, when he was promoted to lieutenant colonel and became operations officer of Marine Aircraft Group 42, operating along the West Coast of the United States. He was appointed group's executive officer in September 1944 and held that duty until December that year, when he was ordered to Hawaii for new assignment.

He then served as assistant operations officer of aircraft, Fleet Marine Force, Pacific under Major General James T. Moore until June 1945, when he was finally ordered to the combat area as operations officer on the staff of Commander, Naval Air Base, Okinawa. Bowman participated in the administering of shore controlled air-sea rescue facilities and was decorated with Bronze Star Medal with Combat "V" for his service.

== Korea and postwar career ==
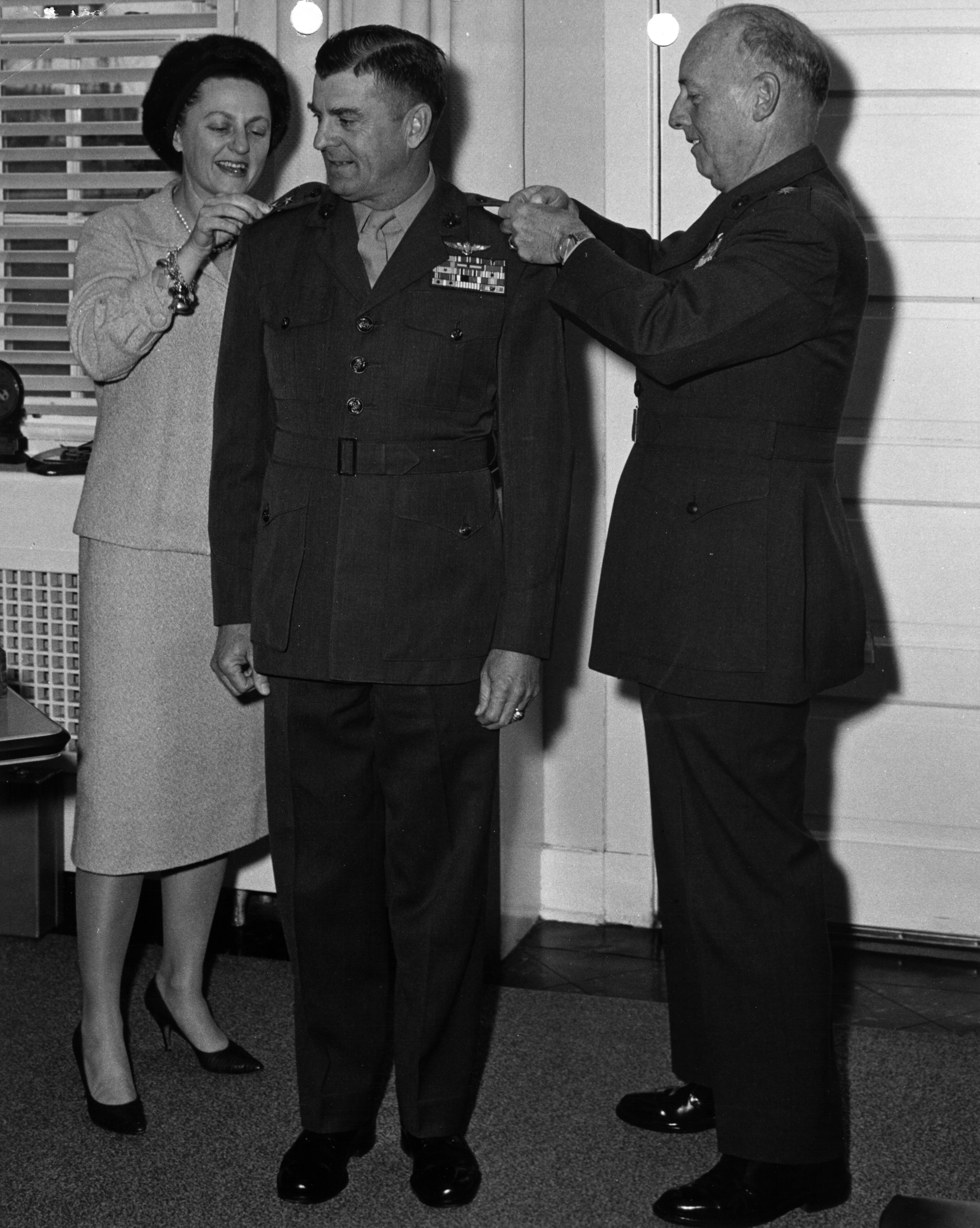
Bowman during promotion ceremony to major general in April 1965. New insignia is pinned on by his wife, Velma, and Major General Alpha L. Bowser.

Bowman rejoined the Aircraft, Fleet Marine Force, Pacific in November 1945 and served as squadron commander with Marine Aircraft Group 15. He served in that capacity until March 1946, when he reported to Marine Corps Schools, Quantico for the Command and Staff Course. Upon graduation in August 1946, Bowman remained at Quantico and served as an instructor in the Aviation Section through May 1949. He was subsequently transferred to the Headquarters Marine Corps in Washington, D.C. and assumed duty as assistant head and, later, head, Personnel Branch, Division of Aviation under Major General William J. Wallace. While in this capacity, Bowman was promoted to colonel in February 1951. While in this capacity, Bowman was appointed directly by Commandant of the Marine Corps, General Clifton B. Cates, as senior member of a seven-man study group established to evaluate the use of helicopters for Marine Corps.

In July 1952, Bowman was ordered to Korea and joined Marine Aircraft Group 12 (MAG-12) under Colonel John P. Condon as executive officer. The MAG-12 was attached to 1st Marine Aircraft Wing and provided support actions for allied units along the Korean Demilitarized Zone. Bowman succeeded Condon in mid-January 1913 and personally took part in an attack bomber in a massed aerial assault on enemy supply installations in the vicinity of Chinnampo on March 26, 1953. For his part in this mission, he was decorated with Distinguished Flying Cross and Air Medal. He was also decorated for his service as commanding officer of the squadron, and received Legion of Merit with Combat "V".

Bowman completed his tour in Korea in April 1953 and returned to the United States. He was ordered to the Headquarters Marine Corps and appointed a member of a board studying the Marine Aviation Ground Officer Program. Bowman remained in that assignment until August that year, when he was sent to the National War College for senior course.

Upon graduation in July 1954, Bowman was ordered to the Marine Corps Air Station Cherry Point, North Carolina, and assumed duty as chief of staff, 2nd Marine Aircraft Wing under Brigadier General Verne J. McCaul. While in this capacity, 2nd MAW was responsible for the training of replacements and demobilization of personnel returning from Korea. Upon detachment of General McCaul in January 1956, Bowman was transferred to the headquarters of Marine Corps Schools, Quantico under Lieutenant General Edwin A. Pollock as director of the junior school.

Bowman returned to Headquarters Marine Corps in July 1958 and served consecutively as deputy assistant director of the Division of Aviation under major generals John C. Munn and Arthur F. Binney. He served in this capacity until April 1960, when he was ordered to Hawaii for duty as assistant chief of staff for operations on the staff of Commander-in-Chief, United States Pacific Command under Admiral Harry D. Felt. Bowman was promoted to brigadier general in July that year.

In February 1963, Bowman was transferred to Marine Corps Air Station Iwakuni, Japan, and assumed duty as assistant wing commander, 1st Marine Aircraft Wing under Major General Frederick E. Leek. He later served in that capacity under Major General Frank C. Tharin and remained in the Far East area for another year.

== Vietnam War ==
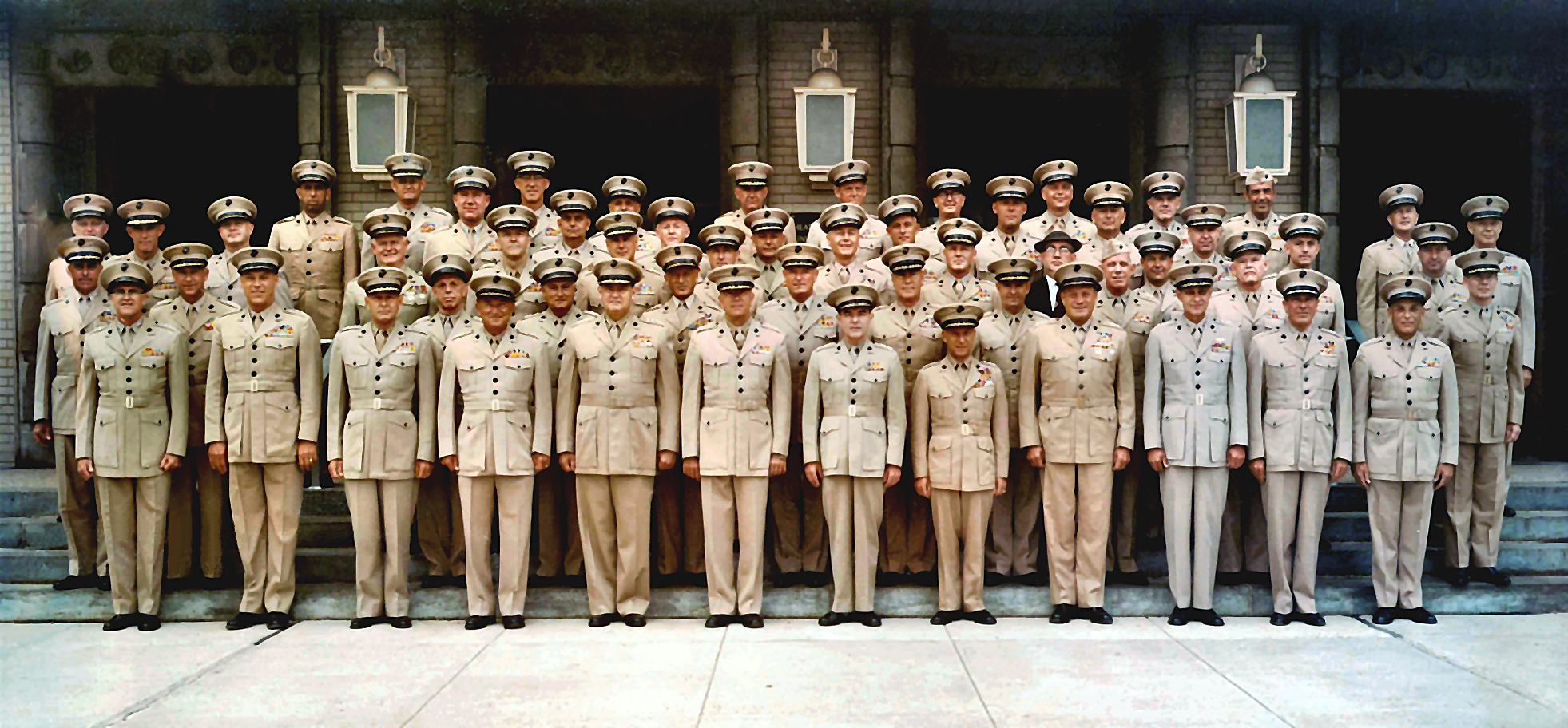
Bowman (4th from right, second row) at the 1967 General Officers Symposium

Bowman returned to the United States in April 1964 and joined the headquarters of 2nd Marine Aircraft Wing (2nd MAW) at Marine Corps Air Station Cherry Point, North Carolina. He served as assistant wing commander and deputy to Major General Paul J. Fontana for brief period, before succeeded him in command in June that year. The 2nd MAW was not deployed overseas during the Vietnam War, but maintained Combat readiness and trained replacement personnel for other Marine aviation in Southeast Asia. While in this capacity, Bowman was promoted to major general in April 1965 and received his second Legion of Merit for his service.

In June 1966, Bowman was ordered to Norfolk Navy Yard, Virginia, and assumed duty as deputy commander, Fleet Marine Force, Atlantic under Lieutenant General Alpha L. Bowser. He was transferred to Washington, D.C., in June 1968 and assumed duty as Marine Corps liaison officer in the Office of the Chief of Naval Operations under Admiral Thomas H. Moorer. Bowman served for a year in this capacity and was decorated with his third Legion of Merit.

He was subsequently ordered to South Vietnam and joined the headquarters of III Marine Amphibious Force in Da Nang by the beginning of July 1969. Bowman relieved Major General Carl A. Youngdale and served as deputy commander under Lieutenant General Herman Nickerson Jr. during the planning and execution of several search-and-destroy operations (including Oklahoma Hills, Pipestone Canyon). His units inflicted severe losses on the enemy during these operations, capturing over 17,000 weapons and tons of enemy munitions, supplies, and foodstuffs.

In March 1970, Bowman was transferred the headquarters XXIV Corps under Lieutenant General Melvin Zais and served as his deputy until August that year. For his thirteen months in South Vietnam, he was decorated with Navy Distinguished Service Medal and also received several decorations from the Government of South Vietnam, including the National Order, rank Knight and Gallantry Cross with Palm.

== Retirement ==
Upon his return stateside, Bowman assumed command of Camp Pendleton, California, and while in this capacity, he was responsible for demobilization of troops returning from Vietnam. He retired from active duty on February 1, 1972, after 36 years of commissioned service and assumed job as superintendent, Marine Military Academy in Harlingen, Texas, relieving another Marine brigadier general, Edward H. Hurst.

Bowman retired for second time in 1979, and made his home in Harlingen. He died on May 3, 2005, aged 93, and was buried with full military honors at Arlington National Cemetery, Virginia. Bowman was married twice, his first wife Ellen Fouts died in 1958 and he then remarried to Velma Roth. He had three children from his first marriage, sons George S. III, who was killed in action in Vietnam as Marine Lance corporal in July 1969, and Denham W.; and a daughter Diane.

== Decorations ==
Major General Bowman's personal decorations include:

Naval Aviator Badge
1st Row	Navy Distinguished Service Medal		Legion of Merit with Combat "V" and two 5/16" Gold Stars	
2nd Row	Distinguished Flying Cross	Bronze Star Medal with Combat "V"	Air Medal	Navy Presidential Unit Citation with one star
3rd Row	Navy Unit Commendation	American Defense Service Medal with Base Clasp	American Campaign Medal	Asiatic-Pacific Campaign Medal with one 3/16 inch service star
4th Row	World War II Victory Medal	Navy Occupation Service Medal	National Defense Service Medal with one service star	Korean Service Medal with two 3/16 inch service stars
5th Row	Vietnam Service Medal with two 3/16 inch service stars	Korean Order of Military Merit, 5th Class	National Order of Vietnam, Knight	Vietnam Gallantry Cross with Bronze Star
6th Row	Republic of Korea Presidential Unit Citation	Vietnam Gallantry Cross Unit Citation	United Nations Korea Medal	Vietnam Campaign Medal

== See also ==
- Marine Corps Aviation

Military offices
Preceded by Donn J. Robertson	Commanding general, Camp Pendleton; August 1970 - January 1972	Succeeded by Herman Poggemeyer Jr.
Preceded by Paul J. Fontana	Commanding general, 2nd Marine Aircraft Wing; June 1964 - May 1966	Succeeded by Norman J. Anderson
