= Carl W. Hoffman =

U.S. Marine Corps Major General

Carl William Hoffman
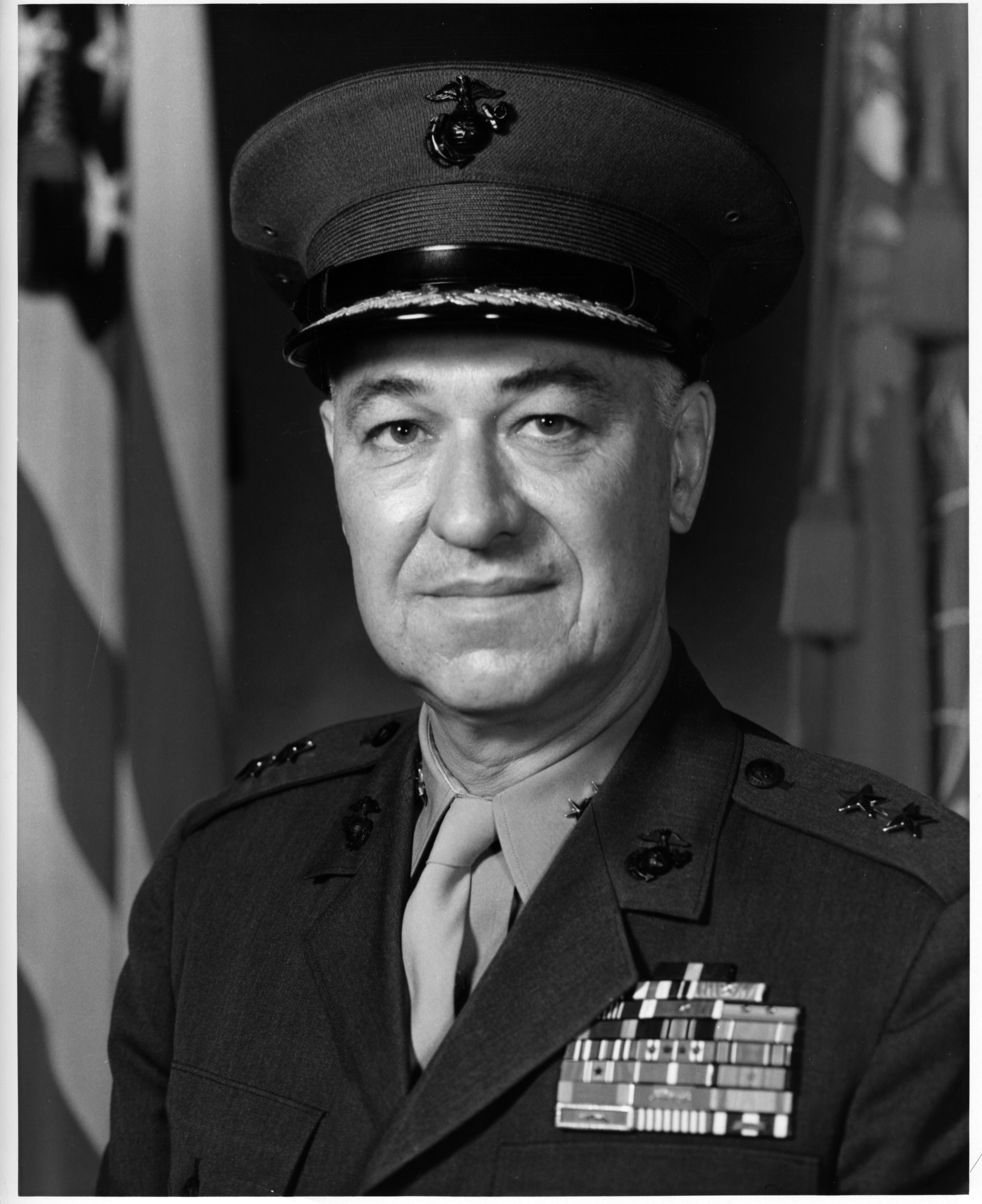
- MG Carl W. Hoffman, USMC
- Born: December 24, 1919; Omaha, Nebraska, US
- Died: May 31, 2016 (aged 96); Escondido, California, US
- Burial place: Arlington National Cemetery
- Relatives: BG James R. Schwenk (son-in-law)
- Military career
- Allegiance: United States
- Branch: United States Marine Corps
- Service years: 1940–1978
- Rank: Major general
- Service number: 0-9472
- Commands: Camp Pendleton; III Marine Amphibious Force; MCRD Parris Island; MCB 29 Palms; Military Secretary to the Commandant of the Marine Corps; 1st Marine Regiment; 3rd Battalion, 1st Marines
- Conflicts: World War II: Battle of Guadalcanal; Battle of Tarawa; Battle of Saipan; Battle of Tinian; Korean War; Vietnam War: Tet Offensive; Operation Scotland II; Operation Lancaster II; Operation Frequent Wind
- Awards: Distinguished Service Medal; Silver Star; Legion of Merit (2); Army Commendation Medal; Purple Heart (2)

Carl William Hoffman (December 24, 1919 – May 31, 2016) was a decorated United States Marine Corps major general. He is most noted for his service with 2nd Battalion, 8th Marines during World War II or later as commanding general of III Marine Amphibious Force during Operation Frequent Wind.

== Early life ==
Carl W. Hoffman was born on December 24, 1919, in Omaha, Nebraska, and attended Thomas Jefferson High School in Council Bluffs, Iowa. He won a nationwide trumpet competition and was awarded a scholarship to the Drake University in Des Moines, Iowa, where earned Bachelor of Arts degree in Music in summer 1941. While at the university, he enlisted the Marine Corps Reserve via Platoon leaders Class at Officer Candidates School on May 18, 1940, and took part in summer training camps in 1940 and 1941.

== World War II ==
Hoffman was commissioned second lieutenant in the marine corps reserve on March 15, 1942, and sailed for the 3rd Battalion, 8th Marines located in American Samoa. He spent next several months with jungle training and construction of beach fortifications against possible Japanese threat. Hoffman arrived with 8th Marines to Guadalcanal at the beginning of November 1942 and took part in the heavy combats. He was later wounded in action and ordered to Wellington, New Zealand for recovery. During his time there, he was promoted to the rank of first lieutenant and appointed commanding officer of 3rd Battalion, 8th Marines Weapons Company. He was promptly promoted to the rank of captain during 1943.

The 8th Marines spent several months in New Zealand, before sailed within 2nd Marine Division to Tarawa atoll, Gilbert Islands in November 1943. Hoffman led his Weapons Company ashore on November 20, but his landing craft received direct hit from a Japanese mortar and eight marines were killed and several wounded. He led the rest of his men ashore and during the next three days of hand-to-hand combat, Hoffman and his company were integrated into the 2nd Battalion under Major Henry P. Crowe. Hoffman later recalled: "There was just no way to rest; there was virtually no way to eat. Mostly it was close, hand-to-hand fighting and survival for three and a half days. It seemed like the longest period of my life."

Following the battle, Eight Marines were ordered to Hawaii for rest and refit. Hoffman was subsequently transferred to 2nd Battalion, 8th Marines and appointed Commander of Company G. He spent next six month with training and integration of replacements into the regiment.

During the June 1944, units of 2nd Marine Division sailed to for the new target, Saipan in the Marianas. Hoffman landed with his company on the right flank of the division on June 15, Captain Hoffman braved intense artillery and mortar fire to reorganize his men for their assault on enemy beach positions and for securing contact with the unit on his right. At dawn of the following day, he resumed the attack and personally directing the company in the face of hostile fire. He was slightly wounded and received the Silver Star for gallantry in action.

The Eight Marines subsequently took part in the Seizure of Tinian and Hoffman had another lively experience before leaving the island. He was a trumpet addict and carried his horn with him all through the Pacific war:

"For Tinian, I didn't take any chances such as sending my horn ashore in a machine gun cart or a battalion ambulance. I had it flown over to me. One evening, my troops were in a little perimeter with barbed wire all around us on top of the cliff. My Marines were shouting in requests: "Oh, You Beautiful Doll" and "Pretty Baby" and others. While I was playing these tunes, all of a sudden we heard this scream of "banzai". An individual Japanese soldier was charging right toward me and right toward the barbed wire. The Marines had their weapons ready and he must have been hit from 14 different directions at once. He didn't get to throw [his] grenade. . . . always cited him as the individual who didn't like my music. He was no supporter of my trumpet playing. But . . . I even continued my little concert after we had accounted for him."

Hoffman returned to the United States during September 1944 and was ordered to the instruction at Army Infantry School at Fort Benning, Georgia which he completed in the spring of 1945. He was subsequently promoted to the rank of major and appointed instructor at Marine Corps Schools, Quantico.

== Postwar career ==
Major Hoffman remained at Quantico until 1948, when he was attached to the History Section at the Headquarters Marine Corps. While in this capacity, he served under Colonel Robert D. Heinl Jr. and wrote several historic series about Marine Campaigns in Pacific. Hoffman remained in this capacity until 1951 and subsequently commanded recruiting stations in New York City and Boston until May 1954. He also competed in ASCAP's armed forces competition to celebrate 100th Anniversary of the birth of John Philip Sousa and won $1,000 with his "Esprit de Corps March". He was meanwhile promoted to the rank of lieutenant colonel on October 22, 1952.

He was then ordered to Korea and appointed commanding officer of 3rd Battalion, 1st Marines. However, Armistice Agreement was already in effect, and Hoffman spent his time in Korea with guard duties along the Korean Demilitarized Zone. Hoffman was later transferred to the staff of 1st Marine Division under Major General Merrill B. Twining and appointed assistant chief of staff for operations. First Marine Division was ordered back to the United States in April 1955 and Hoffman was transferred to staff of U.S. Pacific Fleet under Admiral Felix Stump. Hoffman served on the Fleet Headquarters on Hawaii as Joint Plans Officer until summer of 1957. He distinguished himself in this capacity and received Army Commendation Medal.

Hoffman was subsequently ordered for the instruction at Armed Forces Staff College at Norfolk, Virginia, and upon the graduation one year later, he was appointed intelligence officer of 1st Marine Division under Major General Edward W. Snedeker. Hoffman left 1st Marine Division in 1960 in order to enter Senior Course at Naval War College in Newport, Rhode Island. Upon the graduation one year later, he was appointed a member of the faculty and promoted to the rank of colonel on July 1, 1962.

He rejoined 1st Marine Division on April 21, 1964, when he was appointed commanding officer of 1st Marine Regiment. Hoffman supervised the training of the regiment and preparation for combat deployment in Vietnam until the end of June 1965. He did not went with the regiment to Vietnam and was transferred to the Headquarters Marine Corps, where served as Assistant Head of the Policy Analysis Division under Commandant, Wallace M. Greene. During his time Washington, Hoffman attended George Washington University and earned master's degree in International affairs.

During the last year of General Greene's tenure as the Commandant of the Marine Corps, Hoffman relieved Brigadier General Foster C. LaHue as the Military Secretary to the Commandant of the Marine Corps from February to August 1967. He was then appointed director of Marine Corps Intelligence, but remained in that capacity only until the end of December 1967, when General Greene retired.

== Vietnam War ==
Hoffman was nominated for the promotion to the rank of brigadier general and finally promoted on January 1, 1968. He was subsequently ordered to South Vietnam and joined 3rd Marine Division under Major General Rathvon M. Tompkins on January 22 of that year. Hoffman was appointed assistant division commander, but in fact he shared this capacity with Brigadier General Jacob E. Glick. Hoffman joined General Tompkins at Đông Hà Combat Base and was responsible for the operations and Glick remained at Phu Bai Combat Base with responsibility for the logistics support.

The People's Army of Vietnam (PAVN) and Vietcong, launched Tet Offensive few days after and Hoffman had full hands of work. He was also assigned for temporary additional duty to the staff of III Marine Amphibious Force (III MAF) as Operations Officer (G-3) on March 1 and now held dual command. While in this capacity, Hoffman was tasked by Lieutenant General Robert E. Cushman, commanding general of III MAF, to undertake a broad-based study to estimate the future requirements for the defense of northern I Corps Tactical Zone, South Vietnam.

Hoffman's study group was to assume that the political aspects of the war would not change and that there would be no further refinement of the rules of engagement. He and his group made several proposals relative to the war in the north and proposed the concentration on the future of the barrier, the strongpoints and allied forces along the Vietnamese Demilitarized Zone.

At the end of April 1968, Hoffman moved to Khe Sanh Combat Base and relieved BG Glick as Commander of Task Force Hotel, a combined Marine-Army unit, which operated in the vicinity of the base. He instituted a special four-man deep reconnaissance patrols, which brought back invaluable intelligence about the location of enemy forces in the sector.

On August 18, 1968, Hoffman was transferred to the staff of 1st Marine Division under Major General Carl A. Youngdale and also retained his temporary duty as Operations officer of III MAF. He subsequently took part in the planning of Operations Maui Peak and Meade River and completed his tour in Vietnam in mid February 1969. For his service in Vietnam, Hoffman was decorated with the Navy Distinguished Service Medal and also received several decorations from the Government of South Vietnam.

== Later service ==
Following the brief leave with his family after his return from Vietnam, Hoffman was appointed commanding general of Force Troops, Fleet Marine Force, Pacific (FMFPAC). In this capacity, he was responsible for all independent units under FMFPAC such as support artillery units, antiaircraft artillery units, military police battalions, separate engineer units and other miscellaneous force units. He also held dual hat as commanding general of Marine Corps Base Twentynine Palms, where the headquarters of Force Troops was located.

Hoffman served in this capacity for next two years and following the promotion to the rank of major general in May 1971, he assumed duty as commanding general of Marine Corps Recruit Depot Parris Island, South Carolina. In this capacity, he was responsible for the Recruit Training of new marines, who could later serve as replacements for the units serving overseas. Hoffman received the Legion of Merit for his service at Parris Island in the later phase of the Vietnam War.

He served at Parris Island until October 1972 and subsequently assumed duties as director of personnel at Headquarters Marine Corps. Hoffman was then transferred to Marine Corps Base Quantico and appointed director of Education at Marine Corps Educational Center there. Hoffman served in this capacity only for brief period in 1974 and later assumed command of III Marine Amphibious Force at Okinawa on December 31, 1974. He received second Legion of Merit for his service in this capacity.

During the spring of 1975, the situation in Indochina became worse, when Khmer Rouge seized power in Khmer Republic. The United States Government ordered the evacuation of American citizens and General Hoffman supervised marines units during Operation Eagle Pull, the United States military evacuation by air.

The PAVN general staff launched a massive offensive in March 1975 and successfully advanced on Saigon. The collapse of South Vietnamese government led to the exodus of civilians and need of humanitarian assistance. The United States responded with the providing of air transport of civilians to the areas still under South Vietnamese control and used units of III MAF under Major General Hoffman for that purpose. During Operation Frequent Wind at the end of April 1975, Hoffman's marines assisted in the evacuation of U.S. and South Vietnamese civilians.

Hoffman was succeeded in command of III MAF by Major General Kenneth J. Houghton on May 31, 1975, and was ordered to the States for command of Camp Pendleton, California. He served next three years in this capacity and retired on June 30, 1978, after 38 years of commissioned service.

== Retirement ==
Following his retirement, Hoffman settled in Hidden Meadows, California, where he built a house for him and his wife. He subsequently formed a swing "Carl Hoffman Dance Band" and performed at country, dance, golf and community clubs, birthdays and weddings. They were successful and from total of six band members, only one had a regular job. Hoffman later said about his music career:

"We realized rather soon that Dixieland is very happy, pleasant music to listen to, but after a while people want something else, so we found we needed to expand. . . . We graduated to a big band sound, although there are only six of us. Swing music, that sort of thing. We throw in some songs, and we've even written some arrangements of our own."

Major General Carl W. Hoffman died on May 31, 2016, in Escondido, California, and is buried at Arlington National Cemetery in Virginia, together with his wife, Ruth Allene Hoffman. They had three children: Jill Ann Schwenk, wife of Brigadier General James R. Schwenk; Carl W. Hoffman Jr., who served in the Marines and reached the rank of lieutenant colonel and John David Hoffman, Computer Systems Administrator.

== Decorations ==
Here is the ribbon bar of Major General Carl W. Hoffman:

1st Row	Navy Distinguished Service Medal		
2nd Row	Silver Star		Legion of Merit with one 5/16" Gold Star
3rd Row	Army Commendation Medal	Purple Heart with one 5/16" Gold Star	Navy Presidential Unit Citation with two stars
4th Row	Navy Unit Commendation	Navy Meritorious Unit Commendation	American Defense Service Medal
5th Row	American Campaign Medal	Asiatic-Pacific Campaign Medal with four 3/16 inch service stars	World War II Victory Medal
6th Row	National Defense Service Medal with one star	Korean Service Medal	Vietnam Service Medal with one silver 3/16 inch service star
7th Row	Vietnam National Order of Vietnam, Knight	Vietnam Gallantry Cross with Palm	Armed Forces Honor Medal 1st Class
8th Row	Vietnam Gallantry Cross Unit Citation	United Nations Korea Medal	Vietnam Campaign Medal

== See also ==
- III Marine Amphibious Force
- 3rd Marine Division
- Operation Lancaster II

Military offices
Preceded by Paul G. Graham	Commanding General of Camp Pendleton; June 1, 1975 - June 30, 1978	Succeeded by Stephen G. Olmstead
Preceded by Herman Poggemeyer Jr.	Commanding General of III Marine Amphibious Force; December 31, 1974 - May 31, 1975	Succeeded by Kenneth J. Houghton
Preceded by Oscar F. Peatross	Commanding General of Marine Corps Recruit Depot Parris Island; May 28, 1971 - October 13, 1972	Succeeded by Robert H. Barrow
Preceded by Regan Fuller	Commanding General of Marine Corps Base Twentynine Palms; March 26, 1969 - April 23, 1971	Succeeded by Paul G. Graham
