= Paul J. Fontana =

United States Marine Corps general (1911–1997)

Paul John Fontana
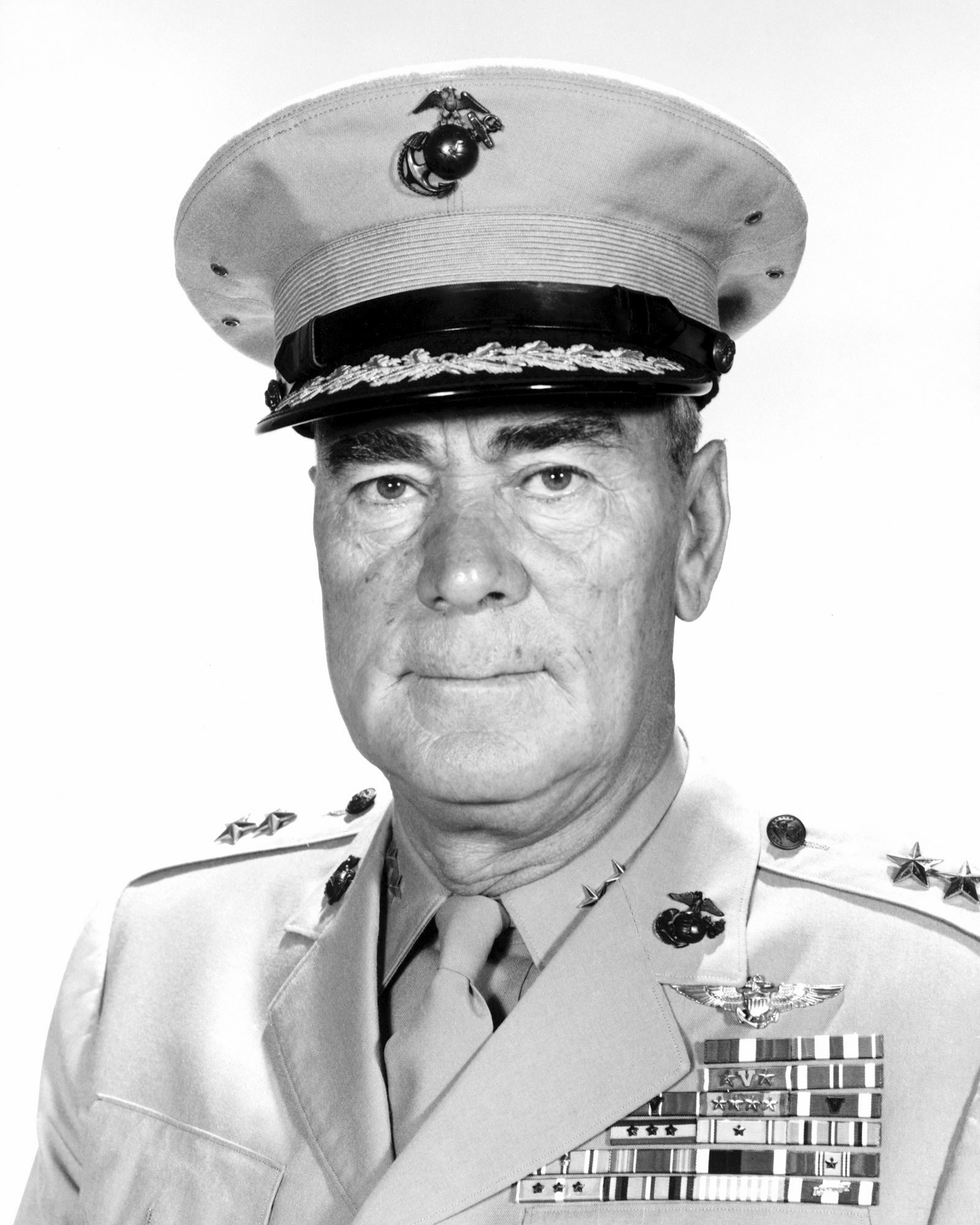
- Born: November 27, 1911; Lucca, Italy
- Died: February 26, 1997 (aged 85); New Bern, North Carolina, US
- Burial place: Arlington National Cemetery; Arlington, Virginia
- Military career
- Allegiance: United States of America
- Branch: United States Marine Corps
- Service years: 1936–1973
- Rank: Major general
- Commands: 2nd Marine Aircraft Wing; 1st Marine Aircraft Wing
- Conflicts: World War II; Guadalcanal campaign; Battle of Okinawa; Korean War; Battle of Chosin Reservoir; Vietnam War
- Awards: Navy Cross; Silver Star; Legion of Merit (3); Distinguished Flying Cross; Air Medal (5)

Paul John Fontana (November 27, 1911 – February 26, 1997) was a highly decorated United States Marine with the rank of major general. He was a flying ace with five aerial victories and a recipient of the Navy Cross during World War II.

== Early life and career ==
Paul J. Fontana was born on November 27, 1911, in Lucca, near Florence, Italy. He was raised in Sparks, Nevada, and graduated from the University of Nevada with a science degree.

Fontana commissioned into the Marine Corps as a second lieutenant on July 6, 1936, and was designated as a naval aviator in January 1940.

== World War II ==
When the United States entered World War II, Fontana was quickly promoted to major, and took command of the recently formed Marine Fighting Squadron 112 (VMF-112) in San Diego on May 11, 1942.

On October 15, Major Fontana's squadron set sail for New Caledonia. Major Fontana arrived at Henderson Field on Guadalcanal on November 2.

On November 11, Major Fontana led eight of his planes into battle against 22 Japanese bombers and six Zero escorts. The enemy was attempting to bomb Henderson Field, but Fontana shot one bomber down and led his squadron repelling the attack. He shot down two more enemy planes the following day that were attempting to attack American ships. A few days later, Major Fontana led six planes against twelve enemy fighters and succeeded in personally shooting two aircraft down. He was later awarded the Navy Cross for his actions during this period.

Major Fontana also led his squadron in strafing attacks on Japanese destroyers off Guadalcanal. He was relieved of his command by Captain Robert B. Fraser on March 27, 1943. He was later assigned to the Tenth Army and took part in the battle of Okinawa.

== Korean War ==
Lieutenant Colonel Fontana would later take part in the Korean War as the commanding officer of Marine Aircraft Group 33. On September 21, 1950, he led a close air support mission against enemy positions near Seoul. Fontana personally made several low level attacks under heavy anti-aircraft fire and aided in destroying the enemy strongpoint. For his actions, he was awarded the Silver Star. He was also awarded the Legion of Merit for his service during the Chosin Reservoir campaign.

== Later career and life ==
Fontana would later be promoted to major general and was made the commanding general of the 2nd Marine Aircraft Wing at Marine Corps Air Station Cherry Point. In addition, he commanded the 1st Marine Aircraft Wing from 1964 to 1965 during the Vietnam War, where he was awarded two Legions of Merit. Major General Fontana retired from the Marine Corps on June 30, 1973.

Retiring in New Bern, North Carolina with his wife, Paul J. Fontana would later die there on February 26, 1997. He was buried in Arlington National Cemetery with his wives Claire R. (1912–1954) and Beth G. (1915–2000).

== Awards and decorations ==
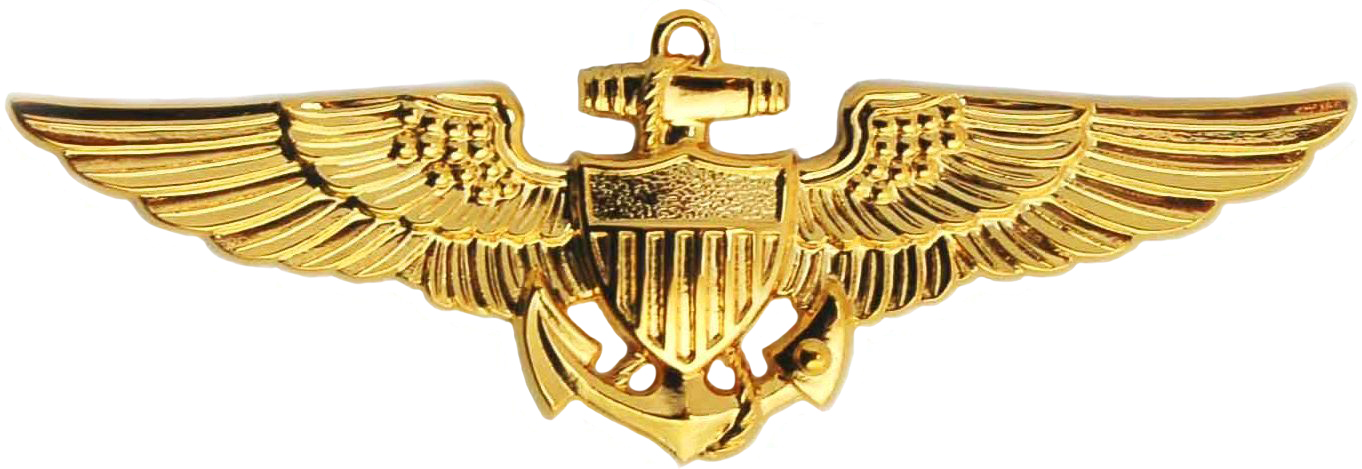

Naval Aviator Badge
Navy Cross		Silver Star
Legion of Merit w/ Combat "V" and two 5/16" Gold Stars	Bronze Star Medal w/ Combat "V"	Combat Action Ribbon w/ two 5/16" Gold Stars
Distinguished Flying Cross	Air Medal w/ four 5/16" Gold Stars	Navy and Marine Corps Commendation Medal w/ Combat "V"
Navy and Marine Corps Presidential Unit Citation w/ three 3/16" Bronze Stars	American Defense Service Medal w/ one 3/16" Bronze Star	American Campaign Medal
Asiatic-Pacific Campaign Medal w/ 3/16" Silver Star	World War II Victory Medal	Army of Occupation Medal
National Defense Service Medal w/ one 3/16" Bronze Star	Armed Forces Expeditionary Medal	Korean Service Medal w/ three 3/16" Bronze Stars
United Nations Korea Medal	Vietnam Campaign Medal	Republic of Korea War Service Medal

=== Navy Cross citation ===

Major Paul John Fontana
U.S. Marine Corps
Date Of Action: Noverber 11 to November 14, 1942

The President of the United States of America takes pleasure in presenting the Navy Cross to Major Paul John Fontana, United States Marine Corps, for extraordinary heroism and distinguished service in the line of his profession while serving as a Pilot in Marine Fighting Squadron ONE HUNDRED TWELVE (VMF-112), Marine Air Group FOURTEEN (MAG-14), FIRST Marine Aircraft Wing, in aerial combat against enemy Japanese forces in the Solomon Islands Area from 11 to 14 November 1942. When twenty-two Japanese bombers with an escort of six Zero-type fighters attempted to bomb Henderson Field, Guadalcanal, Major Fontana, leading a flight of eight planes, shot down one bomber while intercepting and disorganizing the hostile formation before effective completion of its mission was accomplished. On the following day, he sent down in flames two aircraft while his men destroyed five others of a large formation of enemy bombers about to attack friendly ships off Lunga Point. Later, when a force of our bombers on an important offensive mission was intercepted by twelve fighters, Major Fontana, leading a six-plane flight, courageously engaged the attackers and sent two hostile craft hurtling into the water, thereby contributing to the disruption of the enemy attack. His unconquerable fighting spirit and valiant disregard for his own personal safety were in keeping with the highest traditions of the United States Naval Service.

== See also ==
- List of 1st Marine Aircraft Wing commanders

Military offices
Preceded by Frank C. Tharin	Commanding General of the 1st Marine Aircraft Wing; June 1964 - May 24, 1965	Succeeded by Keith B. McCutcheon
