= List of allied military operations of the Vietnam War (1967) =

This article is a list of known military operations of the Vietnam War in 1967, conducted by the armed forces of the Republic of Vietnam, the United States and their allies.

Date Duration	Operation Name	Unit(s) – Description	Location	VC–PAVN KIAs	Allied KIAs
67	Operation Auburn I	7th Marines security operation in the "rocket belt"	around Da Nang, Quảng Nam Province		
67 – 72	Operation Dump Truck	Use of anti-personnel mines as part of Operation Igloo White			
67 – 72	Operation Phoenix	CIA-organized campaign against Vietcong cadres	across South Vietnam		
Jan	Operation Garden City	1st Brigade, 9th Infantry Division operation	near Dong Tam, Long An Province		
Jan	Operation Lam Son 45	ARVN 1st Division operations	Thừa Thiên and Quảng Trị Provinces		
Jan 1 – 31	Operation Camden I	5th Battalion, Royal Australian Regiment cordon-and-search missions	Hoa Long village, south of Nui Dat		
Jan 1 – Apr 5	Operation Sam Houston	2nd Brigade, 4th Infantry Division and 3rd Brigade, 25th Infantry Division search and destroy and border surveillance operation; follow-up to Operation Paul Revere IV	Pleiku and Kon Tum Provinces	733	169
Jan 2	Operation Bolo	USAF decoy mission to disguise the electronic signature of F-4 fighter as F-105s in order to lure VPAF MiGs to engage	North Vietnam	7 MiG 21	
Jan 3 – 31	Operation Mang Ho VIII	ROK Capital Division search and clear operations	Route 1, Phú Yên Province	150	
Jan 4 – 7	Operation Niagara Falls	173rd Airborne Brigade search and destroy operation	Bình Dương Province		
Jan 4 – 9	Operation Lincoln (I Corps)	2nd Battalion, 5th Marines search and destroy operation	Quảng Nam Province		
Jan 5 – 7	Operation Niagara Falls	1st Infantry Division operation to place a blocking force for Operation Cedar Falls	between the Thi Thanh River and Route 13 east of the Iron Triangle		
Jan 5 – 8	Operation County Fair 1-25	2nd Battalion, 1st Marines security operation	Quảng Nam Province		
Jan 5 – 9	Operation Fitchburg	196th Light Infantry Brigade search and destroy operation to position a blocking force for Operation Cedar Falls	Ho Bo Woods, Tây Ninh Province		
Jan 6 – 15	Operation Deckhouse V/Operation Song Than	SLF 1st Battalion, 9th Marines and 3rd and 4th Battalions Vietnamese Marines operation supported by HMM-362 from the USS Iwo Jima	Kien Hoa Province	21	7
Jan 6 – May 31	Operation Palm Beach	3rd Brigade, 9th Infantry Division, 3rd Battalion 39th Infantry and 2nd and 3rd Battalions, 60th Infantry search and destroy operation and establishment of Đồng Tâm Base Camp	Dong Tam, Dinh Tuong Province, IV Corps	570	149
Jan 7 – 9	Operation County Fair 1-28	3rd Battalion, 1st Marines security operation	Quảng Nam Province		
Jan 7 – 19	Operation Silver Lake	3rd Brigade, 9th Infantry Division search and destroy operation	Biên Hòa and Long Khánh Provinces		
Jan 8 – 26	Operation Cedar Falls	25th Infantry Division, 1st Infantry Division, 11th Armored Cavalry Regiment and ARVN operation to attack Vietcong positions	Iron Triangle, Bình Dương Province	735	72
Jan 9 – 10	Operation Caloundra	5th Battalion, Royal Australian Regiment operation against the VC village cadres, cordon-and-search	Bình Ba, 7 km (4 mi) north along Route 2		
Jan 9 – 12	Operation County Fair 1-29	1st Battalion, 1st Marines security operation	Quảng Nam Province		
Jan 10	Operation Glen Burnie	11th Armored Cavalry Regiment and ARVN 52nd Rangers operation	Binh Loc hamlet, Long Khánh Province		
Jan 10 – 28	Operation Wollongong	5th Battalion, Royal Australian Regiment, 6th Battalion, Royal Australian Regiment, 1st APC Squadron and 3 Squadron, SAS search and destroy and security operation	Phước Tuy Province	1	
Jan 20 – 22	Operation County Fair 1-32	2nd Battalion, 1st Marines security operation	Quảng Nam Province		
Jan 20 – 22	Operation County Fair 14	2nd Battalion, 1st Marines security operation	Quảng Nam Province		
Jan 21 – Feb 7	Operation Ma Doo I	28th Regiment, ROK 9th Infantry Division operation	Phú Yên Province	160	
Jan 22 – Feb 2	Operation Stark	Special Forces Detachment B-50 Project OMEGA operation	II Corps		
Jan 24 – 25	Operation Cleveland	2nd Battalion, 4th Marines search and destroy operation	Quảng Nam Province		
Jan 24 – 28	Operation Tuscaloosa	2nd Battalion, 5th Marines search and destroy operation	24 km (15 mi) southwest of Da Nang, Quảng Nam Province	72	
Jan 25 – 28	Operation Maryland	1st Battalion, 3rd Marines clear and search operation	Thừa Thiên Province		
Jan 25 - Feb 7	Operation Lafayette	1st Battalion, 1st Marines, 2nd Battalion, 1st Marines and 3rd Battalion, 1st Marines search and destroy operation	Quảng Nam Province		
Jan 26 – Mar 23	Operation Farragut	1st Brigade, 101st Airborne Division search and destroy operation	Bình Thuận, Ninh Thuận and Lâm Đồng Provinces	115	15
Jan 27 – 30	Operation Colby	11th Armored Cavalry Regiment, 1st Brigade 9th Infantry Division and 3/5 Cavalry operation	north of Phú Mỹ		
Jan 27 – 31	Operation Bullseye V	2/1 Cavalry and ARVN 40th Regiment reconnaissance operation	southwestern Bong Son Plain, Bing Dinh Province		
Jan 27 – Apr 7	Operation Desoto	3rd Battalion, 7th Marines search and destroy operation	Quảng Ngãi Province	383	76
Jan 27 – Feb 3	Operation Iola	3rd Squadron, 5th Cavalry Regiment security operation for the movement of the 9th Infantry Division from Vũng Tàu to Bear Cat	along Route 15		
Jan 28 – 31	Operation Seymour	5th Battalion, Royal Australian Regiment search and destroy operation	Nui Dinh hills, Phước Tuy Province		
Jan 29 – 31	Operation Baek Ma I	ROK 9th Division search-and-destroy operation	Khánh Hòa Province	390	
Jan 29 – Feb 1	Operation County Fair 1-30	3rd Battalion, 1st Marines security operation	Quảng Nam Province		
Jan 29 – Feb 16	Operation Big Spring	1st Brigade, 9th Infantry Division and 173rd Airborne Brigade search and destroy operation	III Corps		
Jan 30 – Feb 1	Operation Trinity	1st Battalion, 7th Marines search and destroy operation	Quảng Ngãi Province		
Jan 31 – Feb 3	Operation Clay	1st Battalion, 5th Marines search and destroy operation	Quảng Trị Province		
Jan 31 – Feb 9	Operation Searcy	1st Infantry Division search and destroy operation	III Corps		
Feb	Operation Highrise	Marines and Army shelling of PAVN gun positions	in and north of the DMZ		
Feb	Operation Lam Son 46	ARVN 1st Division operations	Thừa Thiên and Quảng Trị Provinces		
Feb 1 – 8	Operation Tamborine	6th Battalion, Royal Australian Regiment ambush operation along Route 23	between Đất Đỏ District and Song Tre, Phước Tuy Province	7	4
Feb 1 – 9	Operation Independence	1st Battalion, 1st Marines, 2nd Battalion, 4th Marines, 2nd Battalion 5th Marines and 1st and 2nd Battalions, 26th Marines search and destroy operation	Quảng Nam Province		
Feb 1 – 15	Operation Gatling	1st Brigade, 101st Airborne Division search and destroy operation	Lâm Đồng, Bình Tuy and Bình Thuận Provinces		
Feb 1 – Mar 18	Operation Prairie II	1st Battalion, 3rd Marines, 2nd Battalion, 3rd Marines, 3rd Battalion, 3rd Marines, 3rd Battalion, 4th Marines, 1st Battalion, 9th Marines, 3rd Battalion, 9th Marines and 2nd Battalion, 26th Marines search and destroy operation to prevent the PAVN 324B Division from entering Quảng Trị Province	DMZ area, around Con Thien and Gio Linh,	693	129
Feb 3 – 21	Operation Gadsden	25th Infantry Division, 196th Infantry Brigade and 3rd Brigade 4th Infantry Division operation against the VC 271st and 272d Regiments, 70th Guard Regiment and 680th Training Regiment	near the villages of Lo Go and Xom Giua 30 km (19 mi) northwest of Tây Ninh	161	29
Feb 4 – 15	Operation Muncie	11th Armored Cavalry Regiment reconnaissance in force operations	Route 15 to Ba Ria and Route 2 from Ba Ria to Duc Thanh and Cam My		
Feb 5 – 24	Operation Green Leaf	US search and destroy operation	III Corps		
Feb 7 – Mar 31 1968	Operation Lam Son 67	2nd and 3rd Brigades, 1st Infantry Division and ARVN 5th Division, 18th Division and VNMC 3rd Battalion security operations	Biên Hòa and Bình Dương Provinces		
Feb 11 – 22	Operation Stone	1st Battalion, 1st Marines, 2nd Battalion, 1st Marines, 3rd Battalion, 1st Marines, 2nd Battalion, 4th Marines, 2nd Battalion, 5th Marines, 2nd Battalion, 26th Marines search and destroy operation	Quảng Nam Province		
Feb 12 – Jan 19 68	Operation Pershing	1st Cavalry Division, 3rd Brigade 25th Infantry Division, ROK Capital Division and ARVN 22nd Division operation against the PAVN 610th Division and VC units	Bình Định and Quảng Ngãi Provinces	5401	
Feb 13 – 14	Operation Beaumaris	5th Battalion, Royal Australian Regiment cordon-and-search	An Nhut village between Long Điền District and Đất Đỏ District, Phước Tuy Province		
Feb 13 – Mar 11 68	Operation Enterprise	9th Infantry Division operation	Long An Province	2,107	51
Feb 14 – 17	Operation Tucson	1st and 3rd Brigades 1st Infantry Division and 5th Regiment, 9th Infantry Division operation against the VC 272nd Regiment and the Phu Loi Battalion	southwest Bình Long Province near the Michelin Rubber Plantation	13	3
Feb 16	Operation Bunker Hill	3rd Brigade, 9th Infantry Division operation	Dinh Tuong Province		
Feb 16	Operation Dalby	6th Battalion, Royal Australian Regiment airmobile search-and-destroy operation	area immediately north of Đất Đỏ, Phước Tuy Province		
Feb 16 – Mar 3	Operation Deckhouse VI	SLF 1st Battalion, 4th Marines and HMM-363 two-phase search and destroy operation which augmented Operation DeSoto	southern Quảng Ngãi Province		
Feb 16 – Mar 20	Operation River Raider	3rd Battalion, 47th Infantry Regiment search and destroy operation	Rung Sat Special Zone		
Feb 16 – Jun 13	Operation Chapman	1st and 2nd Battalions, 2nd Infantry Regiment search and destroy operation	Rung Sat Special Zone		
Feb 17 – 18	Operation Bribie	6th Battalion, Royal Australian Regiment search-and-destroy operation to establish a blocking position to prevent the withdrawal eastwards of a VC force which had unsuccessfully ambushed Route 44 between Đất Đỏ and Lang Phước Hải	Ap My An, Phước Tuy Province	70	
Feb 17 – 22	Operation Giant Dragon	ROK 2nd Marine Brigade search and destroy operation	Quảng Ngãi Province	16	
Feb 17 – 22	Operation Lien Ket 81	ARVN 2nd Division search and destroy operation	Quảng Ngãi Province		
Feb 17 – 28	Operation Chinook II	3rd Marine Division operation. Writer Bernard B. Fall was killed by a VC mine while observing this operation	Street Without Joy, Thừa Thiên Province		
Feb 18 – 22	Operation Renmark	5th Battalion, Royal Australian Regiment search and destroy operation into VC stronghold	Long Hải hills	1	
Feb 19 – May 14	Operation Ala Moana	25th Infantry Division operation	Hua Nghai, Tây Ninh and Bình Dương Provinces	382	38
Feb 20	Operation Brandywine	3rd Brigade, 9th Infantry Division search and destroy operation	Dinh Tuong Province		
Feb 22 – May 14	Operation Junction City	3rd Brigade, 4th Infantry Division, 196th Infantry Brigade, 173rd Airborne Brigade, 11th Armored Cavalry Regiment, VNMC 1st and 5th Battalions and ARVN 35th and 36th Ranger Battalions operation	Tây Ninh Province	1728	282
Feb 23 – 27	Operation Pulaski	2nd Battalion, 4th Marines search and destroy operation	Quảng Nam Province		
Feb 25 – 28	Operation Lanoke	2nd Battalion, 5th Marines search and destroy operation	Quảng Nam Province		
Feb 25 – Mar 2	Operation Pittsburg	1st Brigade, 9th Infantry Division spoiling attacks to locate and disrupt VC activity	Biên Hòa Province		
Mar 3 – Apr 3	Operation Blackjack 23	Mobile Guerilla Force operation	western II Corps		
Mar 3 – Apr 3	Operation Dawes	Special Forces Project Omega operation	II Corps		
Mar 3 – Apr 3	Operation Knox	Special Forces Project DELTA operation	II Corps		
Mar 4 – 22	Operation Hancock Queen	3rd Battalion, 503rd Airborne Infantry Regiment and 3rd Battalion, 506th Airborne Infantry Regiment clear and search operation	Bình Thuận, Bình Tuy and Lâm Đồng Provinces		
Mar 6 – 7	Operation Ayr	6th Battalion, Royal Australian Regiment search and destroy operation	near Bình Ba, Phước Tuy Province		
Mar 7 – Apr 8	Operation Waialua	2nd Brigade, 25th Infantry Division search and destroy operation	Hậu Nghĩa, Tây Ninh and Long An Provinces		
Mar 8 – Apr 18	Operation Oh Jak Kyo I	Linkup of the ROK Capital Division and 9th Infantry Division tactical areas of responsibility	Phú Yên Province	831	23
Mar 10 – 12	Operation Yuba	2nd Battalion, 4th Marines search and destroy operation	Quảng Nam Province		
Mar 13 – 18	Operation Tippecanoe	1st Battalion, 5th Marines search and destroy operation	Quảng Ngãi Province		
Mar 15 – 18	Operation Webster	3rd Battalion, 7th Marines search and destroy operation	Quảng Nam Province		
Mar 15 – Apr 30	Operation Blackjack 24	Mobile Guerilla Force operation	western II Corps		
Mar 18 – Apr 21	Operation Makalapa	1st and 2nd Brigades, 25th Infantry Division search and destroy operation	Hậu Nghĩa Province		
Mar 19 – Apr 19	Operation Prairie III	3rd Battalion, 3rd Marines, 1st Battalion, 4th Marines, 3rd Battalion, 4th Marines, 1st Battalion, 9th Marines, 3rd Battalion, 9th Marines and 2nd Battalion, 26th Marines search and destroy operations against the PAVN 324B and 341st Divisions	DMZ		
Mar 20 – Apr 3	Operation Beacon Hill	3rd Marine Division operation	Quảng Trị Province	334	16
Mar 20 – Apr 17	Operation Portsea	1st Brigade, 9th Cavalry Regiment, 11th Armored Cavalry Regiment, 5th Battalion, Royal Australian Regiment, 6th Battalion, Royal Australian Regiment, ARVN 43rd Regiment and 35th Ranger Battalion search and destroy operation	Phước Tuy Province		
Mar 20 – Jul 5 72	Operation Popeye	USAF cloud-seeding operation	over the Ho Chi Minh Trail		
Mar 21 – 25	Operation New Castle	2nd Battalion, 5th Marines search and destroy operation	Quảng Nam Province		
Mar 23 – 24	Operation Early	1st Battalion, 1st Marines search and destroy operation	Quảng Nam Province		
Mar 23 – 27	Operation Perry	2nd Battalion, 7th Marines search and destroy operation	Quảng Ngãi Province		
Mar 29 – Apr 29	Operation Summerall	1st Brigade, 101st Airborne Division search and destroy operation	Darlac, Khánh Hòa and Phú Yên Provinces		
Apr – 11 May	Operation Spearhead	4th Battalion, 47th Infantry Regiment and TF 117 search and destroy operation	Rung Sat Special Zone		
Apr onwards	Operation Daniel Boone	MACVSOG reconnaissance to verify suspected enemy locations, infiltration routes and supply bases	Eastern Cambodia		
Apr 1 – 10	Operation Andover	11th Armored Cavalry Regiment operation	Hậu Nghĩa Province vicinity of village of Tan Hoa	459	42
Apr 2	Operation Harvest Moon (1967)	5th Special Forces Group operation	III Corps		
Apr 4 – 17	Operation Dayton	173rd Airborne Brigade search and destroy operation	Bình Tuy and Long Khánh Provinces		
Apr 4 – 21	Operation Big Horn II	2nd Battalion, 4th Marines, 1st Battalion, 9th Marines, 2nd Battalion, 9th Marines, 3rd Battalion, 9th Marines and 2nd Battalion, 26th Marines search and destroy operation	Thừa Thiên Province		
Apr 5 – 10	Operation Canyon	1st Battalion, 1st Marines, 2nd Battalion, 25th Marines and 2nd Battalion, 26th Marines search and destroy operation including a sweep of the Barrier Island which was bounded by the Cua Dai/Son Thu Bon rivers to the north and the Truong Giang to the west	Quảng Nam and Quảng Trị Provinces		
Apr 5 – Oct 12	Operation Francis Marion	1st and 2nd Brigades, 4th Infantry Division and 173rd Airborne Brigade operation against the NVA 1st and 10th Divisions	western highlands of Pleiku Province	1,203	
Apr 7 – 10	Operation Dixie	2nd Battalion, 5th Marines search and destroy operation	Quảng Nam Province		
Apr 7 – 22	Operation Lejeune	3rd Brigade, 25th Infantry Division, 2/1 Cavalry, 3/1 Cavalry and 3rd Battalion, 7th Marines search and destroy operation	Quảng Ngãi Province		
Apr 8	Operation Hop Tac VII	2nd Brigade, 9th Infantry Division search and destroy operation	Dinh Tuong Province		
Apr 8 – 30	Operation Oregon	Movement of units	III Corps to I Corps		
Apr 9 – 10	Operation Dazzlem	1st Cavalry Division defence of Camp Radcliff	Bình Định Province		
Apr 13 – 17	Operation Humboldt	3rd Battalion 1st Marines search and destroy operation	Quảng Nam Province		
Apr 15 – May 26	Operation Blackjack 25	Mobile Guerilla Force operation	western II Corps		
Apr 15 – May 26	Operation Blackjack	5th Special Forces Group and Mobile Guerilla Force 876 operation			
Apr 16 – May 15	Operation Buckner	Special Forces Detachment B-50 Project Omega operation	western II Corps		
Apr 17	Operation Lawrence	196th Infantry Brigade search and destroy operation	I Corps		
Apr 18 – 30	Operation Newark	1st Battalion, 503rd Airborne Infantry Regiment search and destroy operation along the Song Be River	Biên Hòa and Bình Dương Provinces		
Apr 19 – 21	Operation County Fair 1-34	1st Battalion, 1st Marines and ARVN 4th Battalion, 5th Regiment search and destroy operation	Quảng Nam Province		
Apr 19 – May 31	Operation Prairie V	2nd Battalion, 3rd Marines, 3rd Battalion, 3rd Marines 1st Battalion, 4th Marines, 3rd Battalion, 4th Marines, 1st Battalion, 9th Marines, 2nd Battalion, 9th Marines, 3rd Battalion, 9th Marines and 2nd Battalion, 26th Marines search and destroy operation	Quảng Trị Province		
Apr 20 – 23	Operation Golden Fleece 196-1	3rd Battalion, 21st Infantry Regiment security operation	Quảng Ngãi Province		
Apr 20 – May 17	Operation Prairie IV	Continuation of Operation Hickory	southwest of Con Thien, northern Leatherneck Square	505	164
Apr 20 – Mar 21 1968	Operation Kittyhawk	9th Infantry Division, 11th Armored Cavalry Regiment and 3rd Squadron, 5th Cavalry Regiment security and escort operations	Long Khánh District		
Apr 21 – 25	Operation Grand	3rd Battalion, 7th Marines search and destroy operation	Quảng Nam Province		
Apr 21 – May 17	Operation Union I/Operation Lien Ket 102	1st Battalion, 1st Marines, 2nd Battalion, 1st Marines, 1st Battalion, 5th Marines, 3rd Battalion, 5th Marines and ARVN 1st Ranger Group search and destroy operation	Que Son Valley, Quảng Nam and Quảng Tín Provinces	965	53
Apr 21 – May 21	Operation Shawnee	2nd Battalion, 4th Marines, 2nd Battalion, 9th Marines and 2nd Battalion, 26th Marines search and destroy operation	Thừa Thiên Province		
Apr 22	Operation Beau Diddley	2nd Battalion, 3rd Marines and Swift Boat amphibious operation	I Corps		
Apr 22 - July 31	Operation Baker	3rd Brigade, 25th Infantry Division security operation	Đức Phổ District	1,339	97
Apr 23 – May 15	Operation Manhattan	3rd Brigade, 1st Infantry Division, 3rd Brigade, 4th Infantry Division, 1st and 2nd Brigades, 25th Infantry Division and 11th Armored Cavalry Regiment search and destroy operation	Boi Loi Woods and Long Nguyen Forest north of the Iron Triangle, Bình Dương Province	123	
Apr 26 – May 1	Operation Puckapunyal	7th Battalion, Royal Australian Regiment supported by the 1st Brigade, RNZA 161 Battery search and destroy operation	Phước Tuy Province		
Apr 26 – May 12	Operation Beacon Star	3rd Marine Division operation	Quảng Trị Province, vicinity of Khe Sanh	469	24
Apr 26 – May 22	Operation Hancock I	3rd Battalion, 8th Infantry Regiment and ARVN 45th Regiment search and destroy operation	north of Ban Me Thuot, Darlac Province		
Apr 27 – May 24	Operation Blackjack 33	5th Special Forces Group operation	Châu Đức District	320	67
Apr 28 – May 12	Operation Beaver Cage	1st Battalion, 3rd Marines operation to sweep a long-established VC stronghold	40 km (25 mi) south of Da Nang	200	
May 1–4	Operation Fort Wayne	173rd Airborne Brigade search and destroy operation	Long Khánh Province		
May 1 – 8	Operation Lismore	7th Battalion, Royal Australian Regiment operation	Phước Tuy Province		
May 2 – 3	Operation Hop Tac XVI	2nd Brigade, 9th Infantry Division search and destroy operation	Dinh Tuong Province		
May 3 – 7	Operation Gulf	2nd Battalion, 26th Marines search and destroy operation	Quảng Nam Province		
May 3 – Jun 7	Operation Leeton	7th Battalion, Royal Australian Regiment search and destroy operation	Phước Tuy Province		
May 4 – 5	Operation Lam Son 48	ARVN 1st Division operations	Thừa Thiên and Quảng Trị Provinces		
May 10 – 12	Operation Bowen	6th Battalion, Royal Australian Regiment search and destroy operation	near Long Tan, Phước Tuy Province		
May 11 – Jun 8	Operation Malheur I	1st Brigade, 101st Airborne Division search and destroy operation	Đức Phổ District, Quảng Ngãi Province	869	81
May 13–18	Operation Ahina	25th Infantry Division, 3rd Brigade, 4th Infantry Division and 1st Brigade, 9th Infantry Division search and destroy operation	Bình Dương and Tây Ninh Provinces		
May 13 – Jul 16	Operation Crickett	1st and 2nd Battalions, 26th Marines search and destroy operation	Quảng Trị Province		
May 14 – Dec 7	Operation Kole Kole	2nd Brigade, 25th Infantry Division search and destroy operation	Bình Dương, Hậu Nghĩa and Tây Ninh Provinces	645	
May 16 – Jun 28	Operation Bullard	MIKE Force operation	II Corps		
May 17 – 26	Operation Dallas	1st Brigade, 1st Infantry Division and 1st Squadron, 11th Armored Cavalry Regiment road clearing and security operation	Route 16 near Phu Loi		3
May 17 – 27	Operation Thunder Dragon	ROK 2nd Marine Brigade search and destroy operation	Quảng Ngãi Province	147	14
May 17 – Dec 7	Operation Diamond Head	3rd Brigade, 25th Infantry Division search and destroy operation	Michelin Rubber Plantation, Ho Bo Woods and the Trapezoid, Bình Dương and Tây Ninh Provinces		
May 18 – 28	Operation Hickory	3rd Battalion, 4th Marines, 2nd Battalion, 9th Marines and 2nd Battalion, 26th Marines operation	north from Con Thien to the Bến Hải River, Quảng Trị Province	367	142
May 18 – Dec 7	Operation Barking Sands	25th Infantry Division operation	Hua Nghai and Bình Dương Provinces	304	19
May 18 – Jun 8	Operation Ashland	3/5 Cavalry operation	Biên Hòa and Long Khánh Provinces		
May 18 – 23	Operation Cincinnati	173rd Airborne Brigade operation	III Corps		
May 18 – 26	Operation Beau Charger	US 7th Fleet combined forces amphibious landing and sweep operation	southern half of the DMZ in the Bến Hải River area	83	23
May 19 – 25	Operation Duval	1st Battalion, 7th Marines and 3rd Battalion, 7th Marines search and destroy operation	Quảng Nam Province		
May 19 – 27	Operation Lam Son 54	ARVN 1st Division operation launched in conjunction with Operation Beau Charger and Operation Hickory	Route 1 north of Gio Linh to the Bến Hải River,	342	22
May 19 – Dec 7	Operation Waimea	1st Brigade, 25th Infantry Division search and destroy operation in the Ho Bo Woods, Bo Loi Woods, Filhol Plantation and the Iron Triangle	Bình Dương and Tây Ninh Provinces		
May 21 – Jul 9	Operation Choctaw	1st Battalion, 3rd Marines, 1st Battalion, 4th Marines, 2nd Battalion, 4th Marines and 3rd Battalion, 12th Marines search and destroy operation	Quảng Trị and Thừa Thiên Provinces		
May 25 – Jun 5	Operation Union II	1st Battalion, 5th Marines, 2nd Battalion, 5th Marines, 3rd Battalion, 5th Marines, 1st Battalion, 7th Marines, 2nd Battalion, 7th Marines and ARVN 6th Regiment search and destroy operation to entrap the NVA 3rd and 21st Regiments	north of Tam Kỳ, Quảng Nam Province	701	110
May 30 – Jun 6	Operation Tulsa	11th Armored Cavalry Regiment reconnaissance in force operation and to secure the Gia Ray rock quarry	Route 1 near Suoi Cat		
Jun 1 – Jul 2	Operation Cimarron	Continuation of Operation Prairie IV	Quảng Trị Province		
Jun 1 – Jul 25	Operation Coronado I	9th Infantry Division operation vicinity of Rach Nui Canal (XS 8466)	Dinh Tuong Province	478	34
Jun 1 – Feb 7 68	Operation Hop Tac	2nd and 3rd Brigades, 9th Infantry Division search and destroy and security operation	Dinh Tuong Province		
Jun 2	Operation Lam Son 63	ARVN 1st Division operations	Thừa Thiên and Quảng Trị Provinces		
Jun 3 – Sep 15	Operation Cumberland	1st Battalion, 4th Marines and 3rd Battalion, 12th Marines search and destroy operation	Thừa Thiên Province		
Jun 5 – 7	Operation Rocket	1st Brigade, 9th Infantry Division search and destroy operation	Biên Hòa Province		
Jun 5 – 9	Operation Bluefield	US search and destroy operation	III Corps		
Jun 6 – 7	Operation Darwin	2nd Battalion, Royal Australian Regiment search and destroy operation			
Jun 6 – 11	Operation Colgate	1st Battalion, 3rd Marines, 3rd Battalion, 12th Marines, 2nd and 3rd Battalions, 26th Marines search and destroy operation	Thừa Thiên Province		
Jun 6 – 13	Operation Broken Hill	7th Battalion, Royal Australian Regiment search and destroy operation	Phước Tuy Province		
Jun 8 – Aug 2	Operation Malheur II	1st Brigade, 101st Airborne Division search and destroy operation in the vicinity of the Song Ne Valley and VC Base Area 122	northwest of Đức Phổ District, Quảng Ngãi Province	488	
Jun 9 – 12	Operation Butler	1 Company from each of the 1st Battalion, 7th Marines, 2nd Battalion, 7th Marines and 3rd Battalion, 7th Marines search and destroy operation	Quảng Nam Province		
Jun 9 – 27	Operation Akron	11th Armored Cavalry Regiment reconnaissance in force operation along encountered elements of the VC 274th Regiment and 5th Division	Route 2	56	9
Jun 10 – 25	Operation Kawela	1st Brigade, 25th Infantry Division search and destroy operation	Iron Triangle, Bình Dương Province		
Jun 13 – 20	Operation Great Bend	9th Infantry Division search and destroy operation	III Corps		
Jun 13 – 26	Operation Arizona	2nd Battalion 5th Marines, 2nd Battalion 7th Marines, 3rd Battalion 7th Marines and 3rd Battalion 11th Marines search and destroy operation	Quảng Nam Province		
Jun 15 – 21	Operation Geraldton	2nd Battalion, Royal Australian Regiment search and destroy operation	east of Đất Đỏ, Phước Tuy Province	1	
Jun 15 – 24	Operation Adair	1st Battalion, 5th Marines and 3rd Battalion, 5th Marines search and destroy operation	Quảng Nam and Quảng Tín Provinces		
Jun 16 – Oct 12	Operation Greeley	1st, 2nd and 4th Battalions, 503rd Airborne Infantry Regiment, 4th Infantry Division, 1st Battalion, 12th Infantry Regiment, 3/1 Cavalry, ARVN 5th and 8th Airborne Battalions and 42nd Regiment search and destroy operations against PAVN buildup	Dak To		
Jun 18 – Jul 2	Operation Beacon Torch	US Coastal Division Twelve operation	east of the Truong Giang River and southeast of the city of Hội An	86	13
Jun 19-21	Operation Concordia	2nd Brigade, 9th Infantry Division operation	Long An Province	255	46
Jun 19	Operation Cook	3rd Brigade, 4th Infantry Division, 1st Brigade, 101st Airborne Division and 196th Infantry Brigade cordon and search and search and destroy operation	Quảng Ngãi Province		
Jun 19 – 23	Operation Rhino	2nd Squadron, 11th Armored Cavalry Regiment search and destroy operation			
Jun 20 – Jul 9	Operation Billings	1st Infantry Division operation	Bình Dương, Phước Long and Long Khánh Provinces	347	40
Jun 21 – 30	Operation Cooparoo	7th Battalion, Royal Australian Regiment and 3rd Cavalry Regiment search and destroy operation	Phước Tuy Province		
Jun 25 – Jul 1	Operation Calhoun	1st Battalion, 1st Marines, 2nd Battalion, 1st Marines, 3rd Battalion, 1st Marines, 2nd Battalion, 3rd Marines, 1st Battalion, 5th Marines, 2nd Battalion, 5th Marines, 3rd Battalion, 5th Marines and 1st Battalion, 7th Marines search and destroy operation	Quảng Nam and Quảng Tín Provinces		
Jul 2 – 14	Operation Bear Claw	3rd Marine Division operation SLF part of Operation Buffalo	Quảng Trị Province, vicinity of Con Thien	1281	125
Jul 3 – 18	Operation Bear Bite	Marines amphibious and heliborne assault	near the DMZ	150	
Jul 3 – Apr 7 68	Operation Riley	1st Brigade, 9th Infantry Division and Royal Thai Army Volunteer regiment search and destroy operation	Biên Hòa and Long Khánh Provinces		
Jul 4 – 16	Operation Beaver Track	2nd Battalion 3rd Marines search and destroy operation	near Cam Lo		
Jul 5 – 9	Operation Lion	2nd Squadron, 11th Armored Cavalry Regiment operation			
Jul 6 - 12	Operation Lake	1st Brigade, 101st Airborne Division operation	Quảng Ngãi Province		
Jul 6 – Sep 3	Operation March	5th Special Forces Group Detachment B-50 Project OMEGA operation	II Corps		
Jul 7 – 14	Operation Paddington	2nd Battalion, Royal Australian Regiment, 7th Battalion, Royal Australian Regiment; 1st Squadron, 11th Armored Cavalry Regiment, 2nd Brigade, 9th Infantry Division and ARVN search and destroy operation	Phước Tuy Province		
Jul 7 – Aug 3	Operation Coronado II/Operation Son Thang 3	7MRF 9th Infantry Division, 3/39 Infantry, ARVN 7th Division, 3/47 Infantry search and destroy operation to help provide security for the Dong Tam Base Camp	Dinh Tuong Province, Mỹ Tho River,	73	9
Jul 8 – Aug 28	Operation Akumu/Xay Duong 12-7	1st Brigade, 25th Infantry Division and ARVN 7th Regiment cordon and search operation	Bình Dương Province		
Jul 9 – Aug 26	Operation Hong Kil Dong	ROK Capital Division and White Horse Division operation	Tuy Hòa Province	638	26
Jul 10 – Oct 31	Operation Fremont	1st Battalion, 3rd Marines, 2nd Battalion, 3rd Marines, 1st Battalion, 4th Marines, 2nd Battalion, 4th Marines and 3rd Battalion, 26th Marines search and destroy operation	Quảng Trị and Thừa Thiên Provinces		
Jul 12 – 15	Operation Gem	3rd Battalion, 7th Marines blocking operation	Quảng Nam Province		
Jul 14 – 16	Operation Hickory II	1st Battalion, 4th Marines, SLF A, 2nd Battalion, 3rd Marines search and destroy sweep to clear the area of enemy fortifications, mortar and artillery positions	southern half of the DMZ	39	4
Jul 15	Operation Goethals	5th Special Forces Group MIKE Force operation	II Corps		
Jul 16 – Oct 31	Operation Kingfisher	1st Battalion, 3rd Marines, 2nd Battalion, 3rd Marines, 3rd Battalion, 3rd Marines, 2nd Battalion, 4th Marines, 3rd Battalion, 4th Marines, 1st Battalion, 9th Marines, 2nd Battalion, 9th Marines, 3rd Battalion, 9th Marines and 3rd Battalion, 26th Marines operation	DMZ - Con Thien	1,117	340
Jul 17	Operation Tiger Concordia VI	3rd Battalion, 47th Infantry Regiment riverine search and destroy operation	Long An Province		
Jul 17 – 25	Operation Beacon Torch	2nd Battalion, 3rd Marines amphibious search and destroy operations	Quảng Nam and Quảng Tín Provinces		
Jul 17 – Oct 31	Operation Ardmore	1st Battalion, 13th Marines and 1st and 3rd Battalions, 26th Marines search and destroy operation	Quảng Trị Province		
Jul 19 – Sep 11	Operation Paul Bunyan	1st Infantry Division land clearing operation		3	
Jul 20 – 24	Operation Lam Son 87	ARVN 1st Division operations	Thừa Thiên and Quảng Trị Provinces		
Jul 20 – 26	Operation Bear Chain/Fremont	2nd Battalion, 3rd Marines operation to engage the VC 806th Battalion	"Street Without Joy" area to the east of Route 1 between Quảng Trị and Huế		
Jul 20 – 27	Operation Pecos	1st Battalion, 7th Marines and 3rd Battalion, 11th Marines search and destroy operation	"Happy Valley", Quảng Nam Province		
Jul 21 – 30	Operation Beacon Guide	1st Battalion, 3rd Marines search and destroy operation	29 km (18 mi) south of Huế		
Jul 21 – Aug 2	Operation Emporia I	11th Armored Cavalry Regiment land clearing operation ambushed by the VC 275th Regiment and the 1st Battalion of the VC Dong Hai Regiment	along Route 20 from Gia Tan to the La Nga River	96	14
Jul 24 – 25	Operation Tiger Concordia VIII	3rd Battalion, 47th Infantry Regiment riverine and airmobile search and destroy operation	Long An Province		
Jul 24 – 25	Operation Tiger Coronado VIII	3rd Battalion, 47th Infantry Regiment riverine and airmobile search and destroy operation	Long An Province		
Jul 27 – 29	Operation Stockton	1st Battalion, 7th Marines search and destroy operation	"Happy Valley", Quảng Nam Province		
Jul 28 – Aug 1	Operation Tiger Coronado V	3rd Battalion, 47th Infantry Regiment riverine and airmobile and mechanized search and destroy operation	Dinh Tuong Province		
Jul 30	Operation Winfield Scott	5th Special Forces Group MIKE Force reconnaissance operation	II Corps		
Aug 1 – 3	Operation Pike	1st Marine Division search and destroy operation	Quảng Nam and Quảng Tín Province		
Aug 2 – 13	Operation Hood River	1st Brigade, 101st Airborne Division search and destroy operation	Quảng Ngãi Province		
Aug 3 – 18	Operation Emporia II	11th Armored Cavalry Regiment, 919th Engineer Company and 52nd ARVN Ranger Battalion land clearing operation	Route 20 from the La Nga River to the boundary of Long Khánh Province	96	14
Aug 4 – 16	Operation Ballarat	7th Battalion, Royal Australian Regiment search-and-destroy operation against VC bases	eastern Hat Dich area		
Aug 5 – 9	Operation Rush	2nd Battalion, 4th Marines, 4th Battalion, 12th Marines and 2nd Battalion, 26th Marines search and destroy operation	Thừa Thiên Province		
Aug 7 – 11	Operation Beacon Gate	1st Battalion, 3rd Marines sweep operations	Quảng Nam and Quảng Tín Provinces		
Aug 11 – 28	Operation Cochise	1st Marine Division Task Force X-Ray, comprising 1st Battalion, 3rd Marines, 1st Battalion, 5th Marines, 3rd Battalion, 5th Marines and 2nd Battalion, 11th Marines search and destroy operation	Quảng Nam and Quảng Tín Provinces		
Aug 12 – Sep 1	Operation Benton	101st Airborne Division and 196th Infantry Brigade operation	Quảng Tín Province	397	45
Aug 14 – 16	Operation Tiger Coronado III	3rd Battalion, 47th Infantry Regiment search and destroy operation	Rung Sat Special Zone, Biên Hòa Province		
Aug 20 – Sep 9	Operation Coronado IV	MRF 2nd Brigade, 9th Infantry Division search and destroy operation	Long An Province		
Aug 22 – 27	Operation Akron II	9th Infantry Division search and destroy operation	Long Khánh Province		
Aug 23	Operation Tiger Coronado	3rd Battalion, 47th Infantry Regiment search and destroy operation	Rung Sat Special Zone, Long An Province		
Aug 27 – Sep 5	Operation Yazoo	1st Battalion, 7th Marines and 3rd Battalion, 11th Marines search and destroy operation	"Happy Valley", Quảng Nam Province		
Aug 27 – Sep 6	Operation Belt Drive	2nd Battalion, 3rd Marines search and destroy operation	Nhung River south of Quảng Trị		
Aug 27 – Sep 18	Operation Riley II	1st Brigade, 9th Infantry Division and 3rd Squadron, 5th Cavalry Regiment search and destroy operation	Biên Hòa and Phước Tuy Provinces		
Aug 29 – 30	Operation Tiger Coronado IV	3rd Battalion, 47th Infantry Regiment riverine and airmobile search and destroy operation	Long An Province		
Aug 31 – Sep 21	Operation Ainslie	2nd Battalion, Royal Australian Regiment/RNZIR (ANZAC) operation to clear a VC staging and supply area north of the 1st Australian Task Force base at Nui Dat	Phước Tuy Province		
Sep 1 – 3	Operation Beacon Point	1st Battalion, 3rd Marines amphibious assault operation	"Street Without Joy" area to the east of Route 1 between Quảng Trị and Huế		
Sep 1 – 6	Operation Valdosta I	11th Armored Cavalry Regiment security operation along Route 1	Long Khánh Province	10	2
Sep 1 – 15	Operation Emporia IV	11th Armored Cavalry Regiment security operation for engineering teams	Route 2		
Sep 1 – Nov 17	Operation Strike	4th Battalion, 39th Infantry Regiment and 2nd Battalion, 47th Infantry Regiment operation succeeded by Operation Manchester.	III Corps		
Sep 4 – 15	Operation Swift	Task Force X-Ray: 1st Battalion, 5th Marines, 3rd Battalion, 5th Marines, 2nd Battalion, 11th Marines, ARVN 21st, 37th and Ranger Battalions, 3rd Battalion, ARVN 4th Regiment, 3rd Battalion, ARVN 6th Regiment search and destroy mission	Que Son Valley, Quảng Nam and Quảng Tín Provinces	517	183
Sep 5 – Oct 30	Operation Dragon Fire	ROK 2nd Marine Brigade operation	Quảng Ngãi Province	541	
Sep 8 – Jun 1 68	Operation Muscle Shoals	Interim code name for Operation Igloo White			
Sep 11	Operation Corral	2nd Battalion, 39th Infantry Regiment and 720th MP Battalion security operation	Biên Hòa Province		
Sep 11 – Nov 25	Operation Wheeler	1st Brigade, 101st Airborne Division and 2nd Squadron, 11th Armored Cavalry Regiment search and destroy operation. Consolidated with Operation Wallowa on 11 Nov 67	Quảng Tín Province		
Sep 11 – Nov 11 1968	Operation Wheeler/Wallowa	Task Force Oregon (originally 196th Infantry Brigade, 1st Brigade, 101st Airborne Division and 3rd Brigade, 4th Infantry Division later reconstituted as 23rd Infantry Division consisting of the 196th, 198th and 11th Infantry Brigades operations)	Nui Luc Son Valley, Quảng Nam and Quảng Tín Provinces	10,020	683
Sep 12 – Oct 10	Operation Coronado V	9th Infantry Division operation	Kien Hoa and Dinh Tuong Provinces	347	72
Sep 12 – Oct 31	Operation Neutralize	USAF and US Navy operations against PAVN artillery positions bombarding Con Thien	DMZ		
Sep 15 – 21	Operation Arkansas City I	11th Armored Cavalry Regiment reconnaissance in force operation to attempt to locate and destroy the VC 274th Regiment	Highway 2		
Sep 16 – 28	Operation Ballistic Charge	1st Battalion 3rd Marines operation	Quảng Nam and Quảng Tín Provinces		
Sep 17	Operation Fortress Sentry	2nd Battalion, 3rd Marines amphibious and heliborne search and destroy operation	Quảng Trị Province		
Sep 19 – Jan 31 1969	Operation Bolling	1st Cavalry Division and 173rd Airborne Brigade operation	Phú Yên Province	715	55
Sep 22 – 28	Operation Richmond	3rd Squadron, 11th Armored Cavalry Regiment engineering security operation	along Route 20, Long Khánh Province		
Sep 22 – 29	Operation Shelbyville	2nd Battalion, 1st Marines, 1st Battalion, 3rd Marines, 3rd Battalion, 5th Marines and 1st Battalion, 11th Marines search and destroy operation	Quảng Nam Province		
Sep 23 – 28	Operation Bluefield II	1st Infantry Division search and destroy and road-clearing operation	III Corps		
Sep 24 – Oct 9	Operation Arkansas City II	11th Armored Cavalry Regiment search and destroy operation	Phước Tuy Province		
Sep 26 – Oct 21	Operation Akron III	1st Brigade, 9th Infantry Division search and destroy operation	Biên Hòa Province		
Sep 27 – Nov 19	Operation Shenandoah II	1st Infantry Division operations in Binh Guong Province that extended to include the Loc Ninh area of Bình Long Province after PAVN/VC attacks on Loc Ninh on 29 October 1967. The Battle of Ong Thanh took place when U.S. forces were ambushed by a superior communist force.	Bing Guong and Bình Long Provinces.		
Sep 29 – Oct 11	Operation Kenmore	2nd Battalion, Royal Australian Regiment and 7th Battalion, Royal Australian Regiment search and destroy operation	Phước Tuy Province		
Oct – Dec	Operation Night Bolt	US Navy plan to scuttle a submarine to block the Haiphong channel (Cua Nam Trieu)	Haiphong		
Oct 1 – Feb 8	Operation Dazzlem (1967-68)	1st Cavalry Division (1 Oct 67 – 17 Jan 68) and 173rd Airborne Brigade (17 Jan – 8 Feb 68) search and destroy operation	Bình Định Province		
Oct 4 – Nov 11	Operation Wallowa	23rd Infantry Division and 3/1 Cavalry search and destroy and security operation	Quảng Nam and Quảng Tín Provinces		
Oct 10 – 20	Operation Lam Son 138	two battalions of the ARVN 1st Division operation in conjunction with the US Operation Medina	Hai Lang Forest Reserve, Quảng Trị and Thừa Thiên Provinces		
Oct 10 – 20	Operation Medina	1st Battalion, 1st Marines, 2nd Battalion, 1st Marines, 1st Battalion, 3rd Marines, 1st Battalion, 4th Marines, 1st Battalion, 11th Marines and two battalions of the ARVN 1st Division operation	Hai Lang Forest Reserve		
Oct 11 – 20	Operation Bastion Hill	1st Battalion 1st Marines, 2nd Battalion 1st Marines, 1st Battalion 3rd Marines, 1st Battalion 4th Marines and 1st Battalion 11th Marines search and destroy operation	Quảng Trị and Thừa Thiên Province		
Oct 11 – 20	Operation Coronado VI	MRF 2nd Brigade, 9th Infantry Division search and destroy operation	III Corps		
Oct 12 - Jan 31 1969	Operation MacArthur	4th Infantry Division, 1st Cavalry Division, 173rd Airborne Brigade, ARVN 42nd Regiment and 3rd Airborne Battalion operations, including the Battle of Dak To	western highlands of Pleiku and Kon Tum Provinces	5,731	700+
Oct 14	Operation Lard Yar	Royal Thai Army Volunteer Regiment operation	III Corps		
Oct 15 – 17	Operation Onslow	1st Battalion, 5th Marines and ARVN 2nd Ranger Battalion search and destroy operation	Quảng Nam Province		
Oct 15 – Dec 31	Operation Boudinot	5th Special Forces Group, 27th MSF Company and CIDG operation	Đắk Lắk Province		
Oct 17 – 20	Operation Don Ched I	4th Battalion, 39th Infantry Regiment and Royal Thai Army Volunteer Regiment search and destroy operation	III Corps		
Oct 17 – 24	Operation Formation Leader	2nd Battalion, 3rd Marines amphibious and heliborne search and destroy operation	coastal region east of Route 1, Thừa Thiên Province		
Oct 17 – Nov 1	Operation Shenandoah I	1st Brigade, 1st Infantry Division road-runner operation	Lai Khe–An Loc–Dầu Tiếng area	97	
Oct 20 – 23	Operation Valdosta II	11th Armored Cavalry Regiment security operations	central Long Khánh Province		
Oct 20 – Jan 20 68	Operation Osceola	1st Battalion, 1st Marines and 1st Battalion, 3rd Marines search and destroy operation	Hải Lăng Forest, Quảng Trị Province	76	17
Oct 20 – Apr 7 68	Operation Narasuan	9th Infantry Division and Royal Thai Army Volunteer Regiment search and destroy operation	Biên Hòa Province		
Oct 21 – Nov 1	Operation Coronado VII	9th Infantry Division search and destroy operation	III Corps		
Oct 24 – Nov 4	Operation Knox	2nd Battalion, 3rd Marines and 3rd Battalion, 11th Marines operation	Thừa Thiên Province		
Oct 25 – Nov 6	Operation Granite	1st Battalion, 3rd Marines and 1st Battalion, 4th Marines operation	Thừa Thiên Province		
Oct 27 – Nov 18	Operation Santa Fe	2nd Battalion, Royal Australian Regiment, 7th Battalion, Royal Australian Regiment and A Squadron, 3rd Cavalry Regiment search and destroy operation	Phước Tuy Province		
Nov	Operation Eagle Thrust	Movement of the 101st Airborne Division to South Vietnam			
Nov 1 – Jan 18 1968	Operation Coronado IX	9th Infantry Division, US Navy Task Force 117 and 5th Battalion, VNMC operation	Kien Hoa and Dinh Tuong Province	349	32
Nov 1 – Jan 20 1968	Operation Lancaster	1st Battalion, 1st Marines, 3rd Battalion, 3rd Marines, 2nd Battalion, 9th Marines and 3rd Battalion, 9th Marines search and destroy operation	Route 9 between Cam Lo and in the old Operation Kingfisher area around Ca Lu	46	27
Nov 1 – Jan 20 1968	Operation Neosho	1st Battalion, 4th Marines, 1st Battalion, 9th Marines, 3rd Battalion, 12th Marines and 3rd Battalion, 26th Marines operation	northwest of Huế	77	12
Nov 1 – Mar 31 1968	Operation Scotland	1st Battalion, 9th Marines, 1st Battalion, 13th Marines and 1st, 2nd and 3rd Battalions, 26th Marines operations (including the Battle of Khe Sanh). The operation terminates with commencement of Operation Pegasus	westernmost portion of Quảng Trị Province centered on the Khe Sanh area	1631	204
Nov 1 – Feb 28 1969	Operation Kentucky	1st Battalion, 1st Marines, 2nd Battalion, 1st Marines, 1st Battalion, 3rd Marines, 2nd Battalion, 3rd Marines, 3rd Battalion, 3rd Marines, 1st Battalion, 4th Marines, 2nd Battalion, 4th Marines, 3d Battalion, 4th Marines, 1st Battalion, 9th Marines, 2nd Battalion, 9th Marines, 3rd Battalion, 9th Marines, 1st and 2nd Battalions, 26th Marines and 3rd Tank Battalion anti-infiltration operation	Leatherneck Square between Con Thien, Gio Linh, Cam Lo and Dong Ha	3,921	520
Nov 2 – Jan 5 1968	Operation Santa Fe (1967-68)	1st Brigade, 9th Infantry Division, 11th Armored Cavalry Regiment 2nd Battalion, Royal Australian Regiment, 7th Battalion, Royal Australian Regiment and ARVN 2nd Battalion, 43rd Infantry Regiment operations to open Route 1	Gia Ray to Ham Tan	8	
Nov 5 – Feb 29 68	Operation Napoleon	3rd Battalion, 1st Marines, 1st Battalion, 3rd Marines and 1st Amphibian Tractor Battalion operation	north of the Cua Viet River, Dong Ha area		
Nov 6 – 17	Operation Essex	2nd Battalion, 5th Marines and 3rd Battalion, 5th Marines search and destroy operation	Quảng Nam Province		
Nov 11 – 30	Operation Rose	3rd Battalion, 506th Airborne Infantry Regiment search and destroy operation	Bình Thuận and Ninh Thuận Provinces		
Nov 13 – 29	Operation Badger Hunt	2nd Battalion 3rd Marines search and destroy operation	Đại Lộc District, Quảng Nam Province		
Nov 13 – 30	Operation Foster	2nd Battalion, 3rd Marines, 3rd Battalion, 7th Marines, 2nd Battalion, 7th Marines, and 3rd Battalion, 11th Marines search and destroy operation	Quảng Nam Province		
Nov 16 – 24	Operation Kiên Giang 9-1	MRF, 2nd and 3rd Brigades, 9th Infantry Division, ARVN 7th Division and 9th Division, 5th Battalion, Republic of Vietnam Marine Corps and US Navy TF117 operation against the VC 263rd and 514th Battalions Base Area 470	Dinh Tuong Province	21	12
Nov 17 – 21	Operation Cove	1st Battalion, 4th Marines, 3rd Battalion, 12th Marines and 2nd and 3d Battalions, 26th Marines security operation	Thừa Thiên Province		
Nov 17 – Dec 17	Operation Strike/Operation Uniontown	9th Infantry Division and 199th Infantry Brigade operation	Biên Hòa Province		
Nov 18 – Dec 23	Operation Atlanta II	2nd and 3rd Brigades, 25th Infantry Division and ARVN 5th Division search and destroy operation	Bình Dương and Hậu Nghĩa Provinces		
Nov 23 – Jan 5 68	Operation Forrest	2nd Battalion, Royal Australian Regiment, 7th Battalion, Royal Australian Regiment and 3rd Cavalry Regiment rice denial operation	west, east and southeast of the Nui Dat base		
Nov 24 – 27	Operation Ballistic Arch	1st Battalion 3rd Marines helicopter and amphibious assault operation	7 km (4 mi) south of the DMZ in Quảng Trị Province		
Dec 1 – 17	Operation Uniontown	199th Light Infantry Brigade operation			
Dec 1 – 23	Operation Sultan	Special Forces Project DELTA operation	II Corps		
Dec 1 – Jan 8 68	Operation Klamath Falls	1st Brigade, 101st Airborne Division and 2nd Squadron, 7th Cavalry Regiment search and destroy operation	Bình Thuận, Bình Tuy and Lâm Đồng Provinces		
Dec 3 – 5	Operation Binh Son Support	198th Infantry Brigade operation	near Chu Lai		
Dec 4 – 5	Operation Tiger Coronado IX	3rd Battalion, 47th Infantry Regiment riverine search and destroy operation	Dinh Tuong Province		
Dec 4 – 21	Operation Quicksilver	11th Armored Cavalry Regiment highway security operation for movement of the 101st Airborne Division	between Bến Cát District and Phuoc Vinh		
Dec 5 – 12	Operation Pitt	2nd Battalion, 7th Marines search and destroy operation	Quảng Nam Province		
Dec 8 – Feb 24 1968	Operation Yellowstone	25th Infantry Division, 2/22nd Mechanized and 11th Armored Cavalry Regiment search and destroy operations	Tây Ninh Province, along the Cambodian border	1,254	81
Dec 8 – Mar 11 68	Operation Saratoga	25th Infantry Division operation along the Cambodian border	Bình Dương, Gia Định, Hậu Nghĩa, and Tây Ninh Provinces	3,862	215
Dec 14 – Jan 20 68	Operation Brush	5th Special Forces Group and MIKE Force operation	II Corps/III Corps boundary		
Dec 15 – 23	Operation Citrus	3rd Battalion, 7th Marines search and destroy operation	Quảng Nam Province		
Dec 16 – 31	Operation Camden	3rd Battalion, 25th Infantry Division and ARVN 49th Regiment search and destroy operation	Hậu Nghĩa and Tây Ninh Provinces		
Dec 17 – Jan 31 68	Operation Mang Ho IX	ROK Capital Division search and destroy operation	Bình Định Province	749	
Dec 17 – Feb 17 68	Operation Manchester	199th Infantry Brigade and 3rd Brigade, 101st Airborne Division search and destroy operation	Biên Hòa, Bình Dương, Long Khánh and Phước Long Provinces		
Dec 17 – Mar 8 68	Operation Uniontown	199th Infantry Brigade, 3rd Brigade, 101st Airborne Division and 11th Armored Cavalry Regiment security operation, encompassing Tet Offensive operations	Biên Hòa and Gia Định Provinces	922	76
Dec 18 – 23	Operation Warm Springs	199th Infantry Brigade search and destroy operation. Redesignated Operation Uniontown on 23 Dec 67	III Corps		
Dec 18 – Jan 5 1968	Operation Hall	5th Special Forces Group operation	southwest of Cam Ranh Bay		
Dec 19 – 31	Operation Sylvester	5th Special Forces Group and Vân Canh District CIDG force reconnaissance operation	southwest of Qui Nhơn		
Dec 19 – Jun 10 1968	Operation Muscatine	3rd Brigade, 4th Infantry Division, 11th Infantry Brigade and 198th Infantry Brigade operation	Quảng Ngãi Province	1,129	142
Dec 21 – 24	Operation Fortress Ridge	3rd Battalion, 1st Marines operation	coast of Gio Linh District, 7 km (4 mi) south of the DMZ	10	10
Dec 26	Operation Lam Son 166	ARVN 1st Division operations against the 816th Vietcong Battalion	Thừa Thiên and Quảng Trị Provinces		
Dec 26 – Jan 2 1968	Operation Badger Tooth	3rd Battalion 1st Marines search and destroy operation	Quảng Trị and Thừa Thiên Provinces		
Dec 26 – Jan 21 1968	Operation Fargo	11th Armored Cavalry Regiment operation to engage the VC 271st, 272nd and 273rd Regiments, open Route 13 from An Loc to Loc Ninh and prevent infiltration from Cambodia		2	2
Dec 28 – Jan 3 1968	Operation Auburn	5th Marines operation	on Go Noi Island south of Da Nang	37	24

== See also ==
- List of allied military operations of the Vietnam War (1968)
