= 1st Battalion, 9th Marines =

1st Battalion 9th Marines
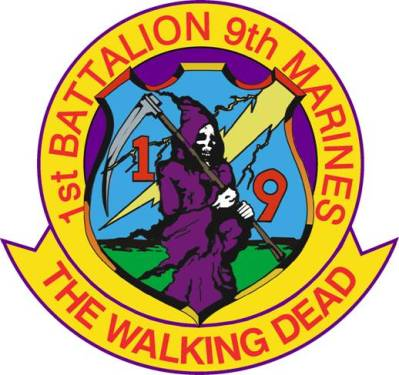
- 1/9 Insignia
- Active: 1 March 1942 – 9 September 2001; April 2007 – August 29, 2014
- Country: United States of America
- Branch: United States Marine Corps
- Type: Infantry
- Role: Locate, close with and destroy the enemy through fire and maneuver
- Part of: 9th Marine Regiment; 2nd Marine Division
- Garrison/HQ: Marine Corps Base Camp Lejeune
- Nickname: "The Walking Dead"
- Engagements: World War II: Battle of Bougainville; Battle of Guam; Battle of Iwo Jima; Vietnam War: Operation Deckhouse Five; Operation Buffalo; Operation Dewey Canyon; Operation Frequent Wind; Tet Offensive; Operation Desert Storm; War on terror: Operation Restore Hope; Operation Iraqi Freedom; Operation Enduring Freedom

Commanders
- Notable commanders: Lemuel C. Shepherd Jr. Carey A. Randall; George W. Smith

The 1st Battalion 9th Marines (1/9) was an infantry battalion of the United States Marine Corps. Formed during World War I, it served until the mid-2000s when it was deactivated to make room for one of three light armor reconnaissance battalions. During the Vietnam War, 1/9 sustained an especially high casualty rate as they faced extraordinary challenges and hardships during their tour. General Võ Nguyên Giáp promised President Ho Chi Minh that he would wipe out the 1st Battalion, 9th Marines, as a present for the leader's birthday (May 19, 1966). In describing the fate that awaited the Marines in the valley, Giap allegedly used the term "Di Bo Chet", translated as the "Walking Dead". He viewed that the Marines should be considered already dead, just not buried yet. However, 1st Battalion, 9th Marines, proudly and defiantly adopted "The Walking Dead" as its nickname due to the unit's persistence and resilience.

In late 2005, the battalion was reactivated and attached to the 8th Marine Regiment at MCB Camp Lejeune; additionally, Motor Transport Drivers and Mechanics were assigned to Headquarters Company, 6th Marine Regiment, Camp LeJeune. Although the first full company has deployed, 1/9 was not expected to be ready for deployment as a battalion until May 2008. On 19 April 2007, 1/9 was officially stood up with all of its subordinate units fully manned.

As of 29 August 2014 the battalion has been deactivated due to a force shaping initiative and downsizing of the Marine Corps. On the occasion of this deactivation, one of its former officers lauded: "Not a better battalion in the world".

== Subordinate units ==
The battalion was composed of four rifle infantry companies and one headquarters and services company:

- Alpha Company
- Bravo Company
- Charlie Company
- Delta Company
- Weapons Company
- Headquarters & Service Company to include Scout Sniper Platoon; Corpsmen; Battalion Command Group Sections (Operations/Plans/Training, Intelligence, Supply, and Administration) along with the Battalion Aid Section. H&S Co. also had a provisional rifle platoon composed of all marines in H&S in the '65-'66 time period. Many of these personnel were assigned to each of the four rifle infantry companies. Delta Company was never stood back up for the GWOT.

== History ==
=== World War I ===
The battalion was activated on 20 November 1917 at Quantico, Virginia as the 9th Regiment. During December 1917 they were deployed to Guantanamo Bay, Cuba, and attached to the 3rd Provisional Brigade. They were relocated during August 1918 to Fort Crockett, Galveston, Texas, and detached from 3rd Provisional Brigade. They moved to Philadelphia, Pennsylvania during April 1919 and deactivated 25 April 1919.

=== World War II ===
The battalion was activated on 1 March 1942 at San Diego, California and were assigned to the 2nd Marine Regiment of the 2nd Marine Division. They were reassigned during August 1942 to Amphibious Corps, Pacific Fleet and shortly thereafter relocated during September 1942 to Marine Corps Base Camp Pendleton, California and reassigned to the 3rd Marine Division. They deployed during January–February 1943 to Auckland, New Zealand and from there participated in the following World War II Campaigns:

- Bougainville Campaign (1 November 1943 – 21 August 1945)
- Northern Solomons (January 1942 – 21 August 1945)
- Battle of Guam (21 July – 10 August 1944)
- Battle of Iwo Jima (19 February – 26 March 1945)

Following the surrender of Japan the battalion was detached during December 1945 from the 3rd Marine Division and returned during December 1945 to Camp Pendleton, California. They were formally deactivated on 31 December 1945.

=== Vietnam War ===
During the Vietnam War, the unit earned the name "The Walking Dead" for its high casualty rate. The battalion endured the longest sustained combat and suffered the highest killed in action (KIA) rate in Marine Corps history, especially during the Battle of July Two. The battalion was engaged in combat for 47 months and 7 days, from 15 June 1965 to 19 October 1966 and 11 December 1966 to 14 July 1969. Based on a typical battalion strength of 800 Marines and Navy hospital corpsmen, 2,892 Marines passed through the unit over those 47 months; 25.89% (747) were killed in action (KIA) and 0.0007% (2) were missing in action (MIA).

1/9 participated in the following operations during the Vietnam War:

- Blastout I August 65
- Golden Fleece Sep–Oct 65
- County Fair Sep–Dec 65
- Rice Straw Oct–Nov 65
- Independence February 1966
- Ky Lam Campaign May 1966
- Liberty July 1966
- Macon Jul–Oct 1966
- Suwannee Aug 1966
- Deckhouse V January 1967
- Prairie II Feb–Mar 1967
- Chinook II Feb–Apr 1967
- Operation Beacon Hill Mar–Apr 1967
- Prairie III Mar–Apr 1967
- Prairie IV Apr–May 1967
- Operation Cimarron Jun–Jul 1967
- Buffalo July 1967
- Fremont Jul–Oct 1967 (became Neosha)
- Kentucky November 1967–Feb 1969
- Neosho November 1967–January 1968
- Scotland November 1967–March 1968
- Checkers December 1967–January 1968
- Ballistic Armor January 1968
- Napoleon/Saline April–May 1968
- Kentucky Apr–Jun 1968
- Lancaster July 1968
- Scotland II Apr–Sep 1968
- Pegasus/LamSon 207 April 1968 26 Mar
- July Action July 1968
- Dawson River November 1968–January 1969
- Dawson River South January 1969
- Dawson River West January 1969
- Dewey Canyon January–March 1969. On 22 February elements of 1/9 Marines operated in the vicinity of FSB Erskine and came into contact with 3rd Battalion, 9th NVA Regiment.
- Apache Snow May–June 1969
- Utah Mesa June-Jul
- Cameron Falls JunAug 1969
- Direct Combat Support 11-18-1969-1-8-1970 21-29June 1970 24–26 July 1970 19–21 May 1971
- Heroic Action 11 May 1972
- Song Thanh 5-72 13 May 1972
- Song Thanh 6-72 24 May 1972
- ReadyOp 27-June 1972
- LamSon 72(I) 29 June 1972
- LamSon 72 (II) 11 July 1972
- Frequent Wind 20–30 April 1975

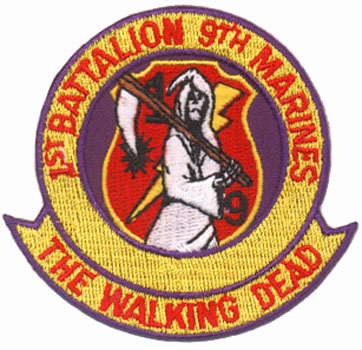
Vietnam-era battalion insignia

=== 1980s and 1990s ===
During most of the 1980s and 1990s, the battalion rotated between Camp Pendleton, California and Camp Hansen, Okinawa, Japan. This consisted of twelve months overseas and 18 months in California.

1st Battalion, 9th Marines, Fleet Marine Force(REIN), Camp Pendleton, California, served on several overseas deployments. 1/9 was re-designated as Battalion Landing Team One Slant Nine (BLT 1/9) and deployed as the infantry element of the 13th MEU/SOC and 11th MEU/SOC. During its deployments, the Marines and Sailors of 1/9 became a Marine Expeditionary Unit (MEU) that was Special Operations Capable (MEU/SOC). The Marines and Sailors were trained in Counter Terrorism, Downed Airman Rescue, Embassy evacuations, SPIE rigging, fast roping, rubber raiding in their inflatable boats for boarding and insertion, and rappelling. Much of the training was spent on foreign Soviet weapons and Soviet military doctrine. The battalion served in the Gulf War.

=== Operation Restore Hope ===
In September 1993, 1st Battalion 9th Marines commanded by LtCol. Silva were the battalion deployed as the ground combat element of the 13th Marine Expeditionary Unit. The 13th MEU arrived off the coast of Somalia in early October onboard warships from Amphibious Squadron 5 USS ''New Orleans LPH-11, USS Denver LPD-9, USS Cayuga LST-1186 and USS Comstock LSD-45 in direct response to the Battle of Mogadishu fought on 3 and 4 October 1993. The 13th MEU and 22nd Marine Expeditionary Unit formed the 1st Marine Expeditionary Brigade (1st MEB) commanded by General Peter Pace. 1st MEB remained on station ready to provide support to United States and United Nations forces.

1st MEB was disestablished when the 22nd MEU (SOC) was reassigned to the Mediterranean area of operations in mid-November. The 13th MEU remained as the principle rapid response force in support of the joint task force and participated in Operation Restore Hope and Operation Continue Hope. They also developed and executed two humanitarian assistance operations. The first, Operation Show Care took place in the cities of Marka and Qoryooley from 11 to 14 November. From 1–3 December 1993, Operation More Care was conducted in the Old Port of Mogadishu. Both operations provided needed medical and dental assistance to Somali citizens.

The 13th MEU (SOC) continued its presence mission through January, providing aircraft for the "Eyes Over Mogadishu" missions as well as sniper support at the United States Embassy compound. On 2 February 1994, the 24th MEU (SOC) relieved the 13th MEU (SOC).

The battalion was deactivated on 9 September 1994 and redesignated 2nd Battalion 1st Marines. The battalion remained inactive from 1994 through 2007.

=== Global war on terror ===
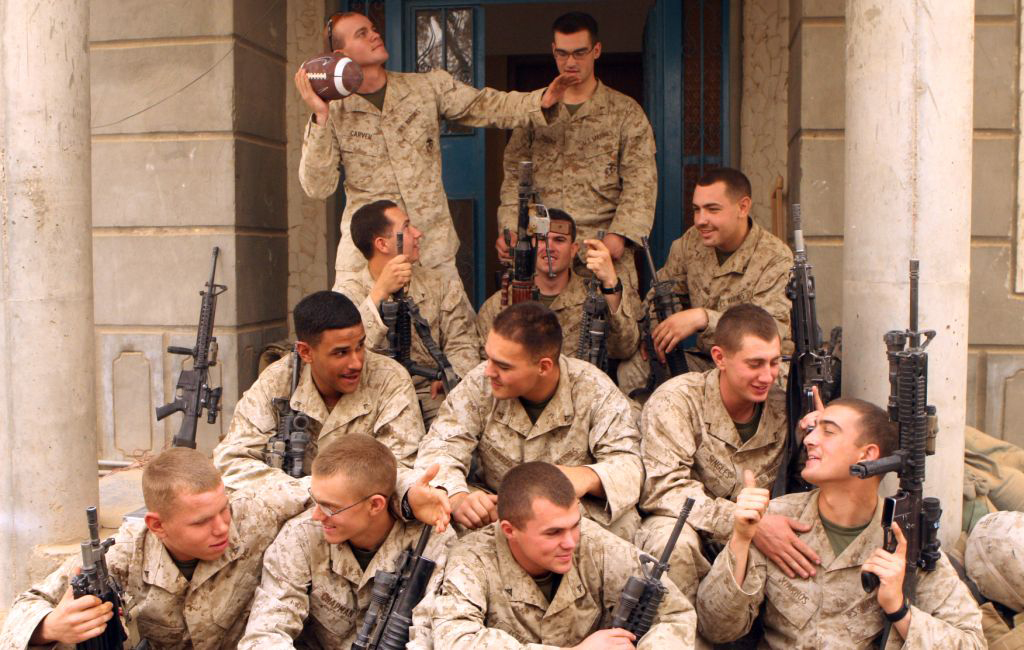
Marines with 1st Battalion, 9th Marine Regiment

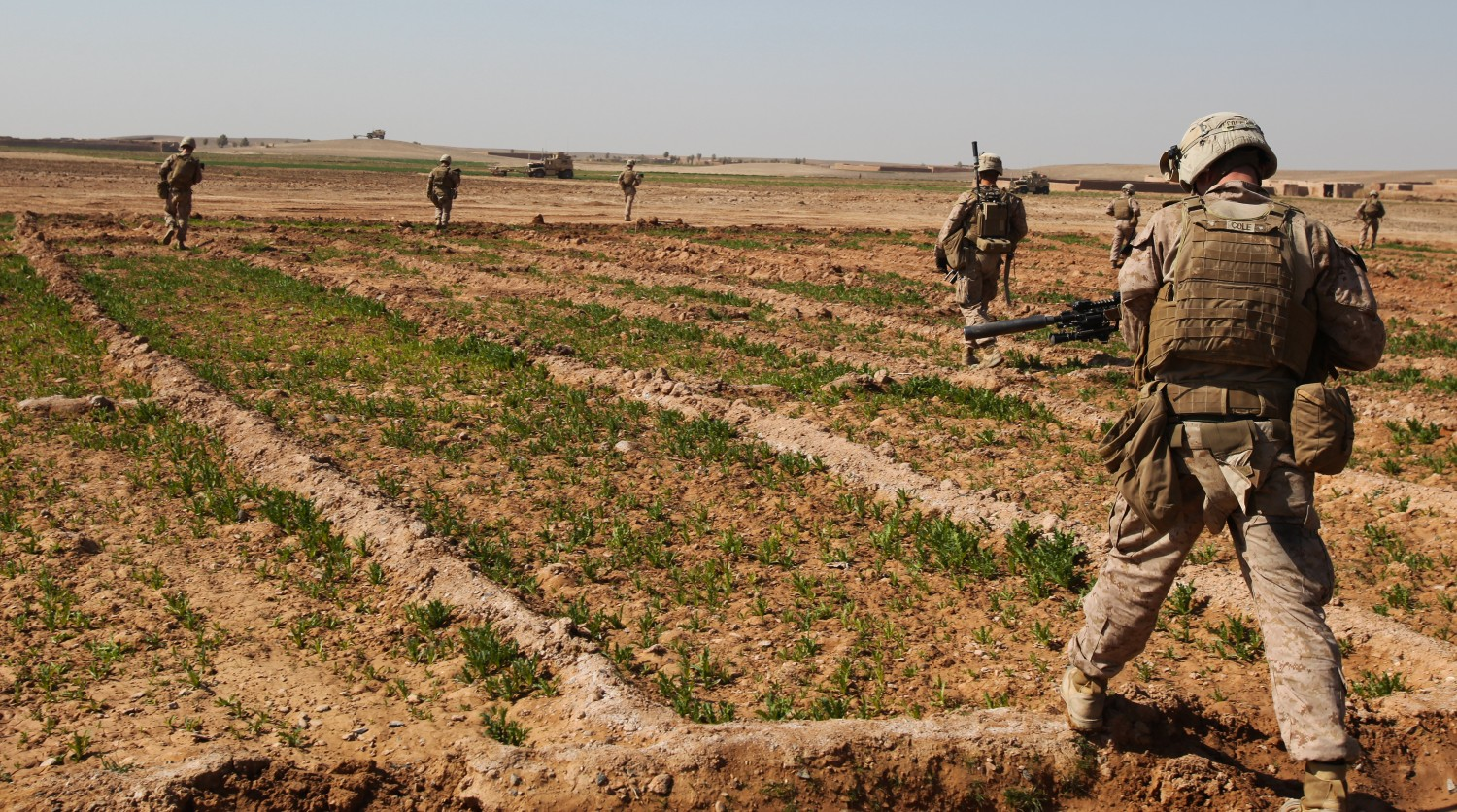
A team of infantry Marines with 3rd Platoon, Charlie Company, 1st Battalion, 9th Marine Regiment, patrols across a field during a security patrol in Helmand province, Afghanistan, 21 February 2014.

In April 2005, the Marine Corps began reactivating 1st Battalion, 9th Marines starting with Alpha Company as an initial evaluation. In April 2006, after only a 30-day work-up cycle, Alpha Company deployed in support of Operation Iraqi Freedom and completed a successful six-month deployment to Forward Operating Base Grizzly in Camp Ashraf, Iraq. During this time, the company conducted security and stabilization operations north of Al Khalis in the Diyala Governorate, working jointly with Military Police, Cavalry and Field Artillery units from the National Guard. Alpha Company returned in October 2006 without the loss of any Marines. Due to Alpha Company's success, 1/9 was officially reactivated in April 2007. In March 2008, the battalion deployed to the Anbar province on a 7-month deployment, and took over sole responsibility of Ar Ramadi and all security missions in the immediate area. The battalion was divided into Police Transition Teams (PTT) and worked directly with Iraqi Police developing them into a more efficient professional police force to provide a more safe and secure living environment for the local populace. 1/9 returned from deployment in October 2008.

From May, 2011 to December, 2011, 1st Battalion, 9th Marines deployed to Helmand province, Afghanistan. This would be the first time the "Walking Dead" would fight in Operation Enduring Freedom in Afghanistan. The battalion detached Alpha Company and attached it to 3rd Battalion, 6th Marines in the city of Marjah while under 1/9, Weapons Company operated separately in Nawa-I-Barakzayi District. Bravo and Charlie Company remained with the rest of 1/9 including H&S Company in Nawa District. Though there were casualties, no Marines were killed in action. From September, 2012 to December, 2012, Alpha Company deployed to Ahmad al-Jaber Air Base, Kuwait, providing security forces for MAG-40. 1/9 deployed to Helmand province Afghanistan from Sept 2013 to May 2014 in support of Operation Enduring Freedom and shortly after returning from this deployment the unit cased their colors again.

== Medal of Honor recipients ==
The Medal of Honor is the highest military decoration awarded by the United States. It is bestowed on a member of the United States armed forces who distinguishes himself "conspicuously by gallantry and intrepidity at the risk of his life above and beyond the call of duty while engaged in an action against an enemy of the United States". The following table contains the names of the men who were recipients of the Medal of Honor while serving in 1/9. They are listed in accordance to the "Date of Action" in which the Medal of Honor citation was made.

Name	Rank	Unit	Place	Date of action	Ref.
Wesley L. Fox	Captain	Company A, 1st Battalion, 9th Marines, 3rd Marine Division	A Shau Valley, Republic of Vietnam	22 February 1969	
John H. Leims	Second Lieutenant	Company B, 1st Battalion, 9th Marines, 3rd Marine Division	Iwo Jima	3 March 1945	
Walter K. Singleton	Sergeant	Company A, 1st Battalion, 9th Marines, 3rd Marine Division	Republic of Vietnam	24 March 1967	
Frank P. Witek	Private First Class	1st Battalion, 9th Marines, 3rd Marine Division	Guam	3 August 1944	

== Navy Cross recipients ==
The Navy Cross is the highest medal that can be awarded by the Department of the Navy and the second highest award given for valor. The following names are of the men who were recipients of the Navy Cross while serving in 1/9.

- LCpl Jordan C. Haerter (posthumous)
- 1stSgt Jettie Rivers Jr. (posthumous – Promoted to 2ndLt)
- SSgt Leon R. Burns
- 2ndLt William J. Christman III (posthumous)
- 1stLt Gatlin J. Howell (posthumous)
- Capt William M. Keys
- Capt Albert C. Slater
- LCpl Dana C. Darnell
- 1stLt Lee Herron (posthumous)
- LCpl Michael Edward Stewart (posthumous)
- 2nd Lt George Malone
- LCpl. James Stogner

== Notable former members ==
- Joseph F. Dunford Jr.
- Walter Fillmore
- John Musgrave
- Edwin Dejesus

== Unit awards ==
A unit citation or commendation is an award bestowed upon an organization for the action cited. Members of the unit who participated in said actions are allowed to wear on their uniforms the awarded unit citation. 1st Battalion, 9th Marines has been presented with the following awards:

Presidential Unit Citation (Navy) with two bronze stars

Presidential Unit Citation (Army)
Navy Unit Commendation with one bronze service star
Meritorious Unit Commendation with two bronze service stars
Asiatic-Pacific Campaign Medal with four bronze stars

World War II Victory Medal

National Defense Service Medal with three bronze stars (WW-2; PLUS: Korea; Vietnam; Afghanistan)

Korean Service Medal
Marine Corps Expeditionary Medal
Armed Forces Expeditionary Medal

Vietnam Service Medal with two silver stars ((10 battle Campaigns)) ((44 Major Combat Operations))
–

Vietnam Cross of Gallantry with Palm Streamer

Vietnam Meritorious Unit Citation Civil Action Medal

== See also ==
- List of United States Marine Corps battalions
- Organization of the United States Marine Corps
- Wallace Terry, profiled 1/9 member Private First Class Reginald "Malik" Edwards in Bloods: An Oral History of the Vietnam War by Black Veterans (1984), pages 3–17
