= VMFA-542 =

United States Marine Corps Aviation unit

Marine Fighter Attack Squadron 542
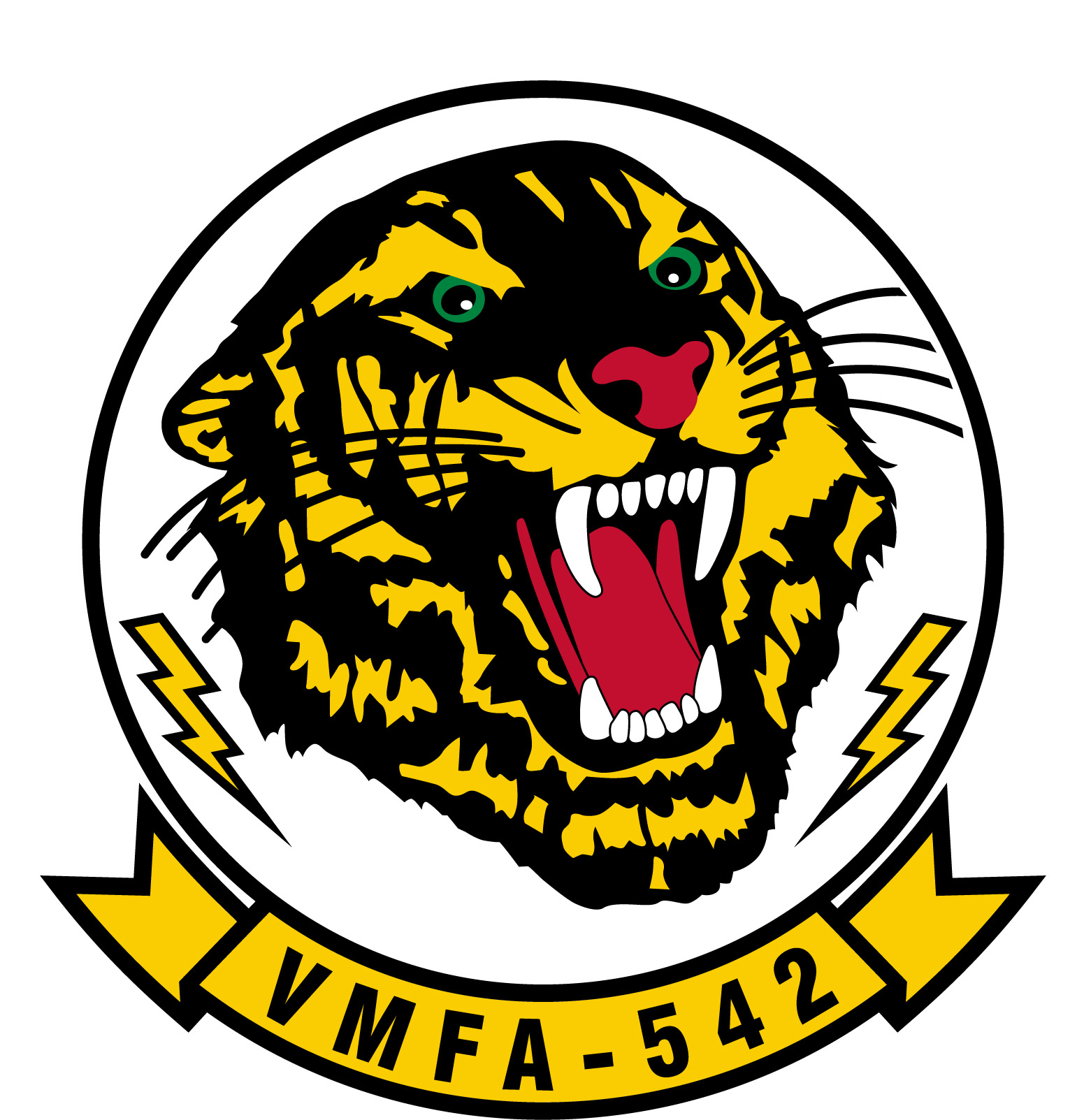
- VMFA-542 Insignia
- Active: 6 March 1944 – 30 June 1970; 12 January 1972 – present
- Country: United States of America
- Branch: United States Marine Corps
- Type: Multirole
- Role: SEAD; Strike; Anti-Air Warfare; SCAR; Close Air Support
- Part of: Marine Aircraft Group 14; 2nd Marine Aircraft Wing
- Garrison/HQ: Marine Corps Air Station Cherry Point
- Nickname: "Tigers"
- Tail Code: WH
- Engagements: World War II; Battle of Okinawa; Korean War; Vietnam War; Operation Starlite; Operation Desert Storm; Operation Iraqi Freedom; Operation Enduring Freedom; Operation Medusa

Commanders
- Current commander: LtCol Jorge C. Couto

Aircraft flown
- Attack: AV-8A Harrier; AV-8B Harrier
- Fighter: F6F Hellcat; F7F Tigercat; F3D-2 Skyknight; F4D-1 Skyray; F-4B Phantom II; F-35B Lightning II

Marine Fighter Attack Squadron 542 (VMFA-542) is a United States Marine Corps Aviation fighter attack squadron flying the F-35B Lightning II. VMFA-542 is based at Marine Corps Air Station Cherry Point, North Carolina and falls under the command of Marine Aircraft Group 14 (MAG-14) and the 2nd Marine Aircraft Wing (2nd MAW).

== Mission ==
Locate, attack and destroy surface targets, intercept and destroy enemy aircraft, and provide electronic warfare support.

== History ==
=== World War II ===
Marine Fighter Attack Squadron 542 was initially commissioned as Marine Night Fighter Squadron 542 (VMF(N)-542) on 6 March 1944, at Marine Corps Air Station Cherry Point, North Carolina. Upon commissioning, the squadron was assigned the F6F Hellcat. They were relocated to San Diego, California, in mid-summer, 1944 in preparation for a move to the combat zone. Late in October, the squadron arrived at Ulithi, in the Caroline Islands and immediately began flying combat air patrols.

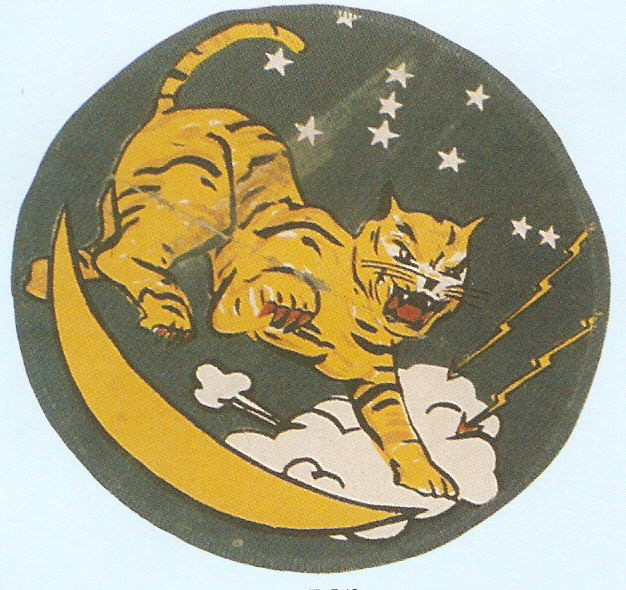
Squadron logo during WWII when they were VMF(N)-542

Later in 1944, VMF(N)-542 deployed to the Pacific theater. By early April 1945, most of the squadron had deployed to take part in the Battle of Okinawa. Night operations against the enemy began on 15 April with missions being flown from Yontan Airfield, Okinawa. Second Lieutenant Arcenaux was the first squadron pilot to down an enemy warplane with a night fighter on 16 April 1945. While stationed at Yontan, the Tigers were credited with destroying eighteen Japanese airplanes and carrying out rocket attacks on the Ryukyu Islands chain of Amami, Amami Ōshima, Tokunoshima, Kikai Shima, Miyako Jima, and Amami Gunto. For these actions the Tigers were awarded the Presidential Unit Citation. Between April and August 1945, Major Robert B. Porter and Captain Wallace E. Sigler became the first night fighter pilots to score their fifth victories on Okinawa. (Both had previous day victories; Capt. Robert Baird of VMFN-533 scored his fifth night kill on 22 June.)

Following a short tour of occupation duty at Yokosuka, Japan, VMF(N)-542 was transferred to Marine Corps Air Station El Toro, California. Training during this period was oriented towards night and all-weather fighter tactics and resulted in the squadron being re-designated Marine Night All-Weather Fighter Squadron 542 (VMF(AW)-542) in 1948.

=== Korean War ===
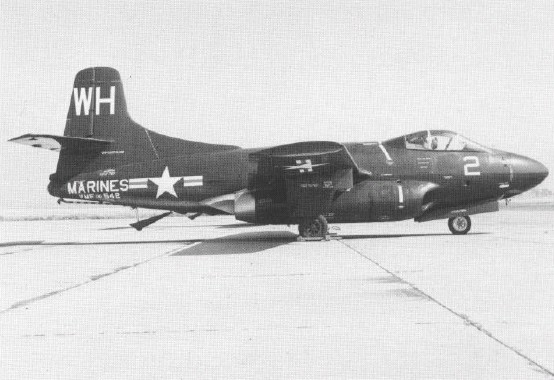
A Douglas F3D-2 of VMF(N)-542 at Pohang during the Korean War

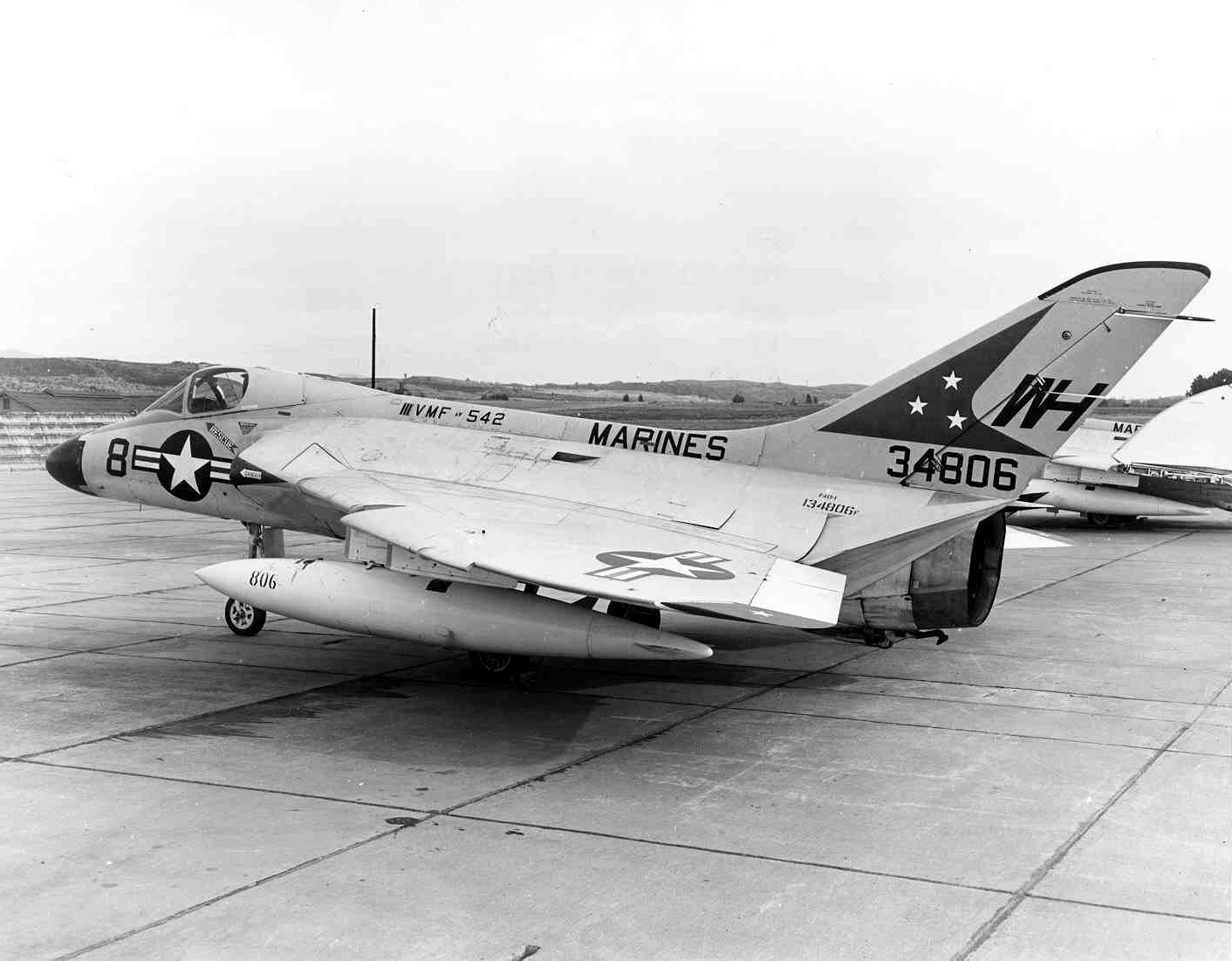
F4D-1 Skyray of VMF(AW)-542 at MCAS El Toro

After receiving the new twin-engine, radar-upgraded F7F Tigercat, VMF(AW)-542 was ordered to Kimpo Airfield, South Korea in September 1950. From Kimpo, missions including close air support, air interdiction, and reconnaissance flights were conducted against the enemy in Korea.

Returning to El Toro, CA in March 1951, VMF(AW)-542 transitioned into the jet age by acquiring the F3D Skyknight. The "Skyknight" was the first carrier-borne jet night fighter. The Tigers used the F3D-2 to train pilots and Radar Intercept Officers for duty in Korea. During the Korean War, more enemy aircraft were destroyed by F3D's than by all other Navy types. The squadron remained at MCAS El Toro, and in June 1958 accepted the F4D Skyray (affectionately known as the "Ford").

Between August 1959 and November 1963, VMF(AW)-542 made two extended deployments to Atsugi, Japan. On 2 November 1963, the Squadron was re-designated Marine Fighter Attack Squadron 542 (VMFA-542) and began training in the F-4B Phantom in place of the F-6 Skyray.

=== Vietnam War ===
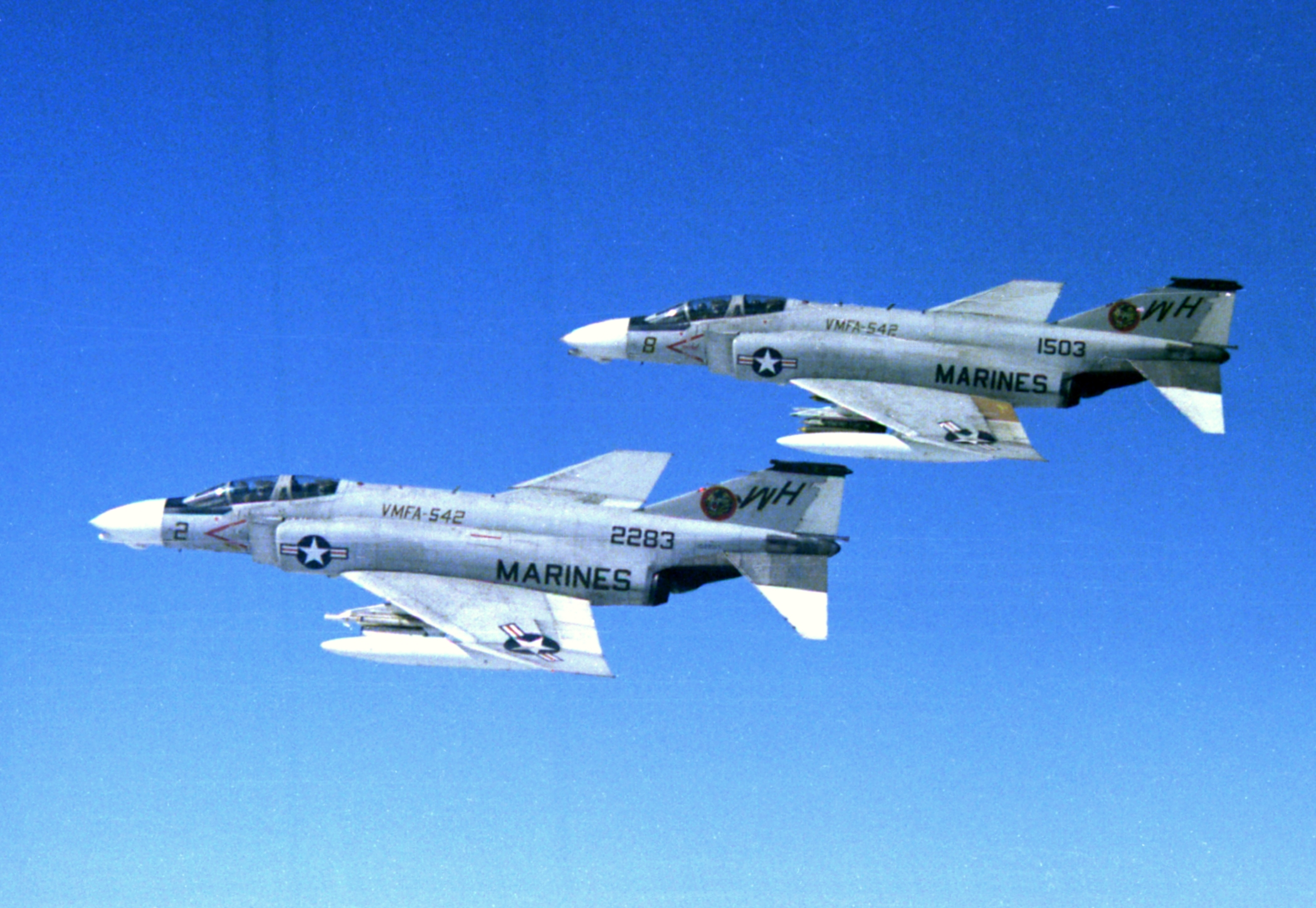
Two F-4Bs of VMFA-542 over Vietnam in January 1969

As a result of the buildup of American involvement in the Vietnam War, VMFA-542 was ordered to Japan in April 1965, followed by redeployment to the Republic of Vietnam a few weeks later. The squadron initially entered the country at Da Nang Air Base on 10 July 1965, and commenced air operations against the enemy shortly thereafter. Its primary mission at this time was to provide air support to Marine ground forces.

In August 1965, VMFA-542 supported the 7th Marine Regiment in Operation Starlite—the first major American operation of the war. The squadron's first tour in South Vietnam ended in early December 1965 when it redeployed to Marine Corps Air Station Iwakuni, Japan. VMFA-542 spent three more tours in Southeast Asia. The Tigers returned to South Vietnam late in the winter of 1966 and remained until mid-summer the following year when they again moved to Japan. Beginning that fall, the Tigers began a thirteen-month deployment in the war zone. The Tigers' last combat tour in Southeast Asia started on 10 May 1968.

While serving in Vietnam, the Tigers furnished air support to ground forces in some of the largest land operations of the war. Included in these operations were: Utah, Texas, Prairie, Union, Kingfisher, Fremont, Allen Brook, Napoleon/Saline, Lancaster, Scotland, Nevada Eagle and Idaho Canyon. Close air support missions were not only flown on behalf of Marine ground personnel but also for American Army units and at times for South Vietnamese forces and for elements of the South Korean Marine Corps. In addition, the Tigers flew bombing missions in both Laos and North Vietnam. After the November 1968 bombing halt of North Vietnam, the Tigers flew escort for reconnaissance missions over that area. Strikes against enemy targets in Laos on the other hand were increased after the bombing halt. Enemy supply lines in Laos were hit especially hard throughout 1969. VMFA-542 dropped over 20,000 tons of ordnance in Southeast Asia from May 1968 to January 1970. The last mission flown by the squadron was a night interdiction flight over Laos on 13 January 1970. The rest of the month was spent preparing to leave South Vietnam. On 30 January, the first echelon took off from Da Nang; the second echelon left the next day. Included in this flight to the United States were thirty-five tactical jet aircraft. Code name for this major relocation of Marine F-4's was Key Wallop II.

=== Post Vietnam and the 1980s ===
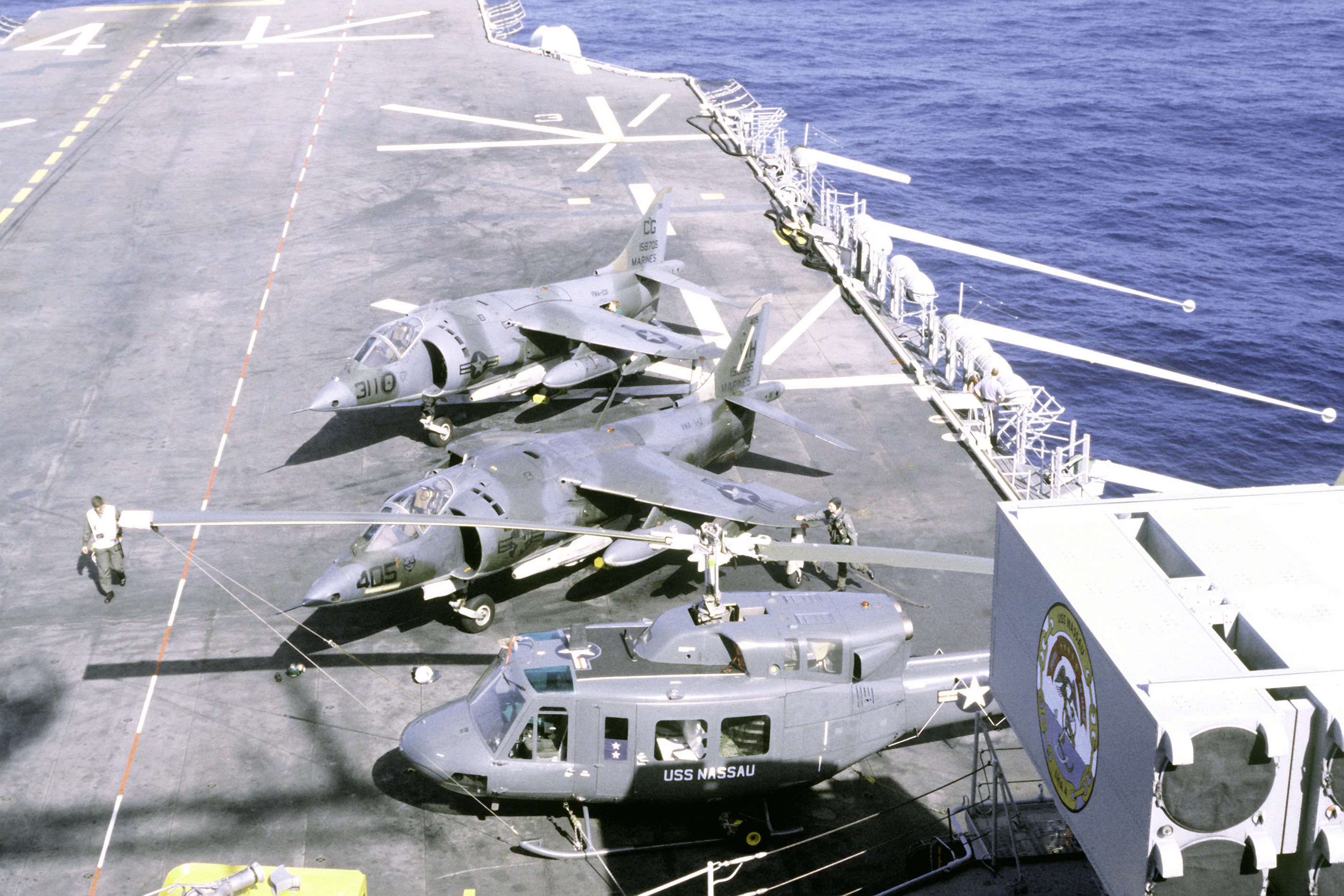
A VMA-542 AV-8C on the USS Nassau in 1982

After the Tiger's return to California, VMFA-542 was placed in a cadre status. In April, the strength of the unit was down to one officer. Deactivation eventually came on 30 June 1970. The squadron's deactivation was of a short duration as it was reinstated as an active organization a year and a half later. Rebirth occurred at Marine Corps Air Station Beaufort, South Carolina on 12 January 1972. The squadron at this time received the designation of Marine Attack Squadron VMA-542. Upon reactivation, the Tigers were assigned the new AV-8A Harrier. The Tigers thus became the second Marine squadron to be so equipped.

The Tigers were relocated to MCAS Cherry Point, North Carolina in August 1974. During the period of 1 July 1977 through 30 June 1979, VMA-542 was selected as the "Marine V/STOL Squadron of the Year" for two consecutive years.

April 1986 saw the end of the AV-8A and C models for VMA-542 as the Tigers transitioned to the AV-8B – the Marine Corps' new light attack "Harrier". Even more capable in V/STOL operations, the AV-8B extends the range and payload and incorporates state of the art technology for navigation and weapon delivery. The full transition was complete by May 1986. December 1989 saw the full squadron deployed for six months to Iwakuni, Japan, in support of the Unit Deployment Program (UDP). They returned to Cherry Point in May 1990.

=== The Gulf War & the 1990s ===
In August 1990, the Tigers deployed to the Bahrain in support of Operation Desert Shield. After three months at that location, the squadron deployed to King Abdul Aziz Naval Base, Jubail, Saudi Arabia as part of the most forward deployed fixed wing group in theater.

Within twelve hours of arrival in Bahrain, Tiger pilots were standing 24-hour combat alerts. The alert status lasted until five hours after the commencement of Operation Desert Storm on 17 January 1991, when the first division of VMA-542 Harriers launched to suppress Iraqi artillery positions in Southern Kuwait. From that day forward. Tiger "Harriers" flew a sustained combat sortie rate until the end of hostilities on 27 February 1991.

On 22 February, two days prior to the initiation of the ground offensive, the Tigers of VMA-542 surged to a schedule of 58 sorties per day as the final battlefield preparation was initiated. These final prep fires included Mk77 Napalm delivered on trench lines in the area where the Marine Expeditionary Force breaching operation would occur. In addition, the Tigers continued targeting of enemy artillery and armor, which could be brought to bear against the Allies during their breaching operations.

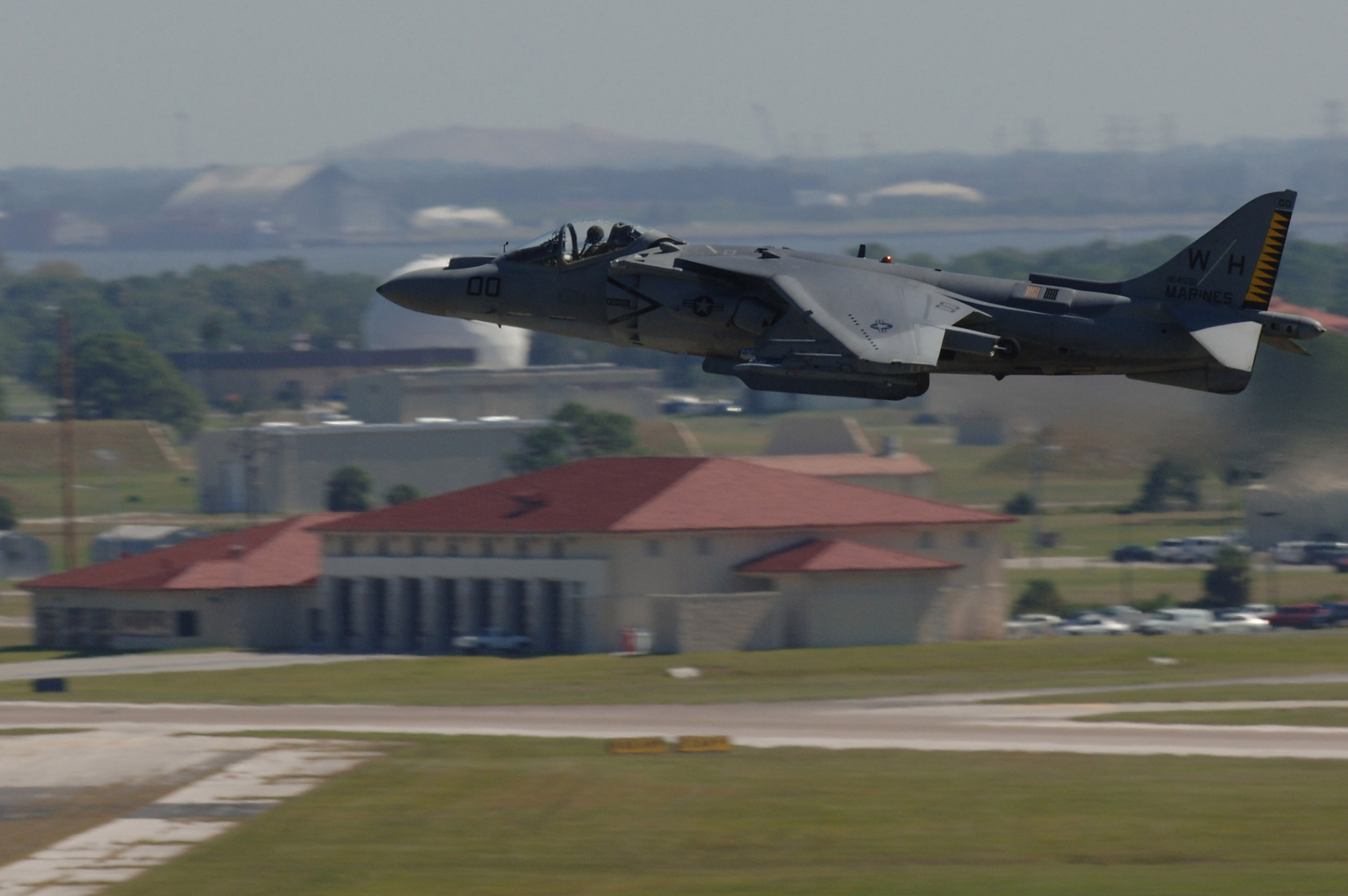
An AV-8B from VMA-542 at MacDill AFB, October 2006

Throughout these forty-two days of conflict the Tigers of VMA-542 flew more than 1000 combat sorties amassing over 1200 flight hours while delivering over one thousand tons of ordnance on the enemy. When the war commenced, VMA-542 responded by delivering more ordnance, flying more sorties, and accruing more combat hours than any other V/STOL squadron in theater. On 23 February, Capt James "Trey" Wilbourn III was lost during a night attack approximately 5 miles north of Ali Al Salem when he was struck by enemy ground fire and crashed near the target after delivering his ordnance on the enemy position. Additionally, on 25 February, Capt Scott "Vapor" Walsh was struck by an IR SAM while flying against Iraqi armored forces counterattacking the 2nd Marine Division. Walsh eventually ejected near Ahmad al-Jaber Air Base and evaded capture until rescued by elements of Marine Task Force Ripper.

The Tigers returned to MCAS Cherry Point in April 1991. Shortly thereafter the squadron was selected to introduce the new Radar/Night Attack AV-8B Harrier II Plus to the fleet in 1993.

On 8 August 1997, the squadron deployed 12 aircraft to Marine Corps Air Station Yuma. The deployment training got off to a strong start but was daunted by the loss of one of the jets piloted by Capt Samuel H. Smith. After several days of flight suspension, the word came that time-consuming inspections would have to be conducted on the aircraft before they could be flown again. These inspections revealed internal engine damage in four of twelve of the aircraft, requiring complete engine replacement.

September marked a recovery period as the squadron deployed two jets and approximately 25 Marines back to Yuma Arizona to support the fall Weapons and Tactics Instructor (WTI) course.

The squadron's detachment aboard USS Kearsarge (LHD-3) returned to Cherry Point on 12 October 1997, after being deployed for nearly six months. A Capabilities Exercise (CAPEX) was conducted on 7–10 October, and just as the operational tempo hit top gear, the squadron experienced yet another setback on 16 October, when one of the jets was lost in Dayton, Ohio.

May 1999 marked the return of the 24th Marine Expeditionary Unit boat detachment from combat operations in Kosovo. Their support of NATO operations was the first in armed conflict since Desert Storm. They successfully flew 38 combat sorties deployed aboard the USS Nassau (LHA-4).

=== Global War on Terrorism ===
The squadron deployed to Al Asad Airbase in Al Anbar Province in support of Operation Iraqi Freedom during 2004–2005 and 2007–2008.

=== Operation Enduring Freedom ===
Elements of VMA-542 attached to the 24th MEU, were called upon to deploy to Afghanistan as part of the surge to counter Taliban actions. Throughout a 6 month deployment, the Tigers provided Close Air Support to Special Operations Forces in some of the most demanding terrain imaginable.

=== Operation Odyssey Dawn ===
On 20 March 2011, VMA-542's Detachment A as part of VMM-266 (Reinforced), 26th Marine Expeditionary Unit (26th MEU) launched air strikes from the USS Kearsarge (LHD-3) against Libya as part of Operation Odyssey Dawn. .

=== Operation Odyssey Lightning ===
In August 2016, elements of VMA-542 assigned to the 22d MEU, participated in Operation Odyssey Lighting. During the operation, they delivered more ordnance off of the USS Wasp than any other harrier squadron assigned to an LHD.

=== Operation Inherent Resolve ===
In 2018 and 2020, elements of VMA-542 assigned to the 26th MEU, conducted combat operations out of Shiek Isa Air Base in Bahrain.

=== F-35B transition ===
On 1 December 2022, VMA-542 retired its remaining Harriers and transitioned to the F-35B Lightning II. VMFA-542 received its first F-35B on 31 May 2023 and became the Marine Corps’ first east coast F-35B fleet squadron after achieving Safe For Flight certification on 11 August 2023. Their first deployment with F-35B, was to Evenes Air Station in Norway to participate in Nordic Response 2024. VMFA-542 achieved full operating capability with the F-35B in April 2024.

== See also ==
- United States Marine Corps Aviation
- List of active United States Marine Corps aircraft squadrons
- List of decommissioned United States Marine Corps aircraft squadrons
