= Operation Neosho =

Part of the Vietnam War (1967–1968)

- Part of the Vietnam War
Date	1 November 1967 – 25 January 1968
Location	Thừa Thiên Province, South Vietnam
Result	Inconclusive

Belligerents
United States	North Vietnam

Commanders and leaders
MG Rathvon M. Tompkins; Col. William L. Dick; Col. Stanley S. Hughes	

Units involved
1st Battalion, 4th Marines; 2nd Battalion, 4th Marines; 1st Battalion, 9th Marines; 3rd Battalion, 12th Marines; 3rd Battalion, 26th Marines	800th Battalion; 802nd Battalion

Casualties and losses
12 killed	US body count: 77 killed 9 captured

Operation Neosho was a security operation in northern Thừa Thiên Province, South Vietnam from 1 November 1967 to 25 January 1968.

== Background ==
Operation Neosho was a continuation of Operation Fremont with the same forces and operational area. The Neosho area of operations was in northern Thừa Thiên Province, northwest of Huế with its northern boundary on the Mỹ Chánh River, the southern boundary on the Bo River, the eastern boundary on Highway 1 opposite the Street Without Joy and the western boundary in the foothills of the highlands. The People's Army of Vietnam (PAVN) Base Area 114 was located in the CoBi-Than Tan valley in the western foothills.

Colonel William L. Dick's 4th Marine Regiment controlled the 3rd Battalion, 12th Marines and 3rd Battalion, 26th Marines at his command post at Camp Evans and BLT 1st Battalion, 3rd Marines and 1st Battalion, 4th Marines which were operating near Hill 674 (16.465°N 107.356°E), and maintained bases on Hills 51 (16.521°N 107.388°E) and 674 at the northern and southern ends of the CoBi-Than Tan valley.

== Operation ==
On 25 October, under the name Operation Granite, the 1/3 Marines and 1/4 Marines attacked Base Area 114 which was believed to be the base of the PAVN 6th Regiment. The Marines engaged elements of the 6th Regiment's 800th and 802nd Battalions, killing 20 PAVN for the loss of 25 Marines. At the end of the operation on 6 November, BLT 1/3 Marines was moved north to Quảng Trị Province.

On 18 November, 1/4 Marines was deployed outside the Neosho operational area. On 22 November 1st Battalion, 9th Marines replaced the 3/26th Marines at Camp Evans and 3/26 Marines swept the CoBi-Than Tan valley before being moved to Khe Sanh Combat Base on 13 December, leaving 1/9 Marines as the only infantry battalion in the area.

Despite the limited results from Operation Granite and subsequent operations, the 3rd Marine Division MG Rathvon M. Tompkins was concerned about the PAVN's intentions in the Neosho and Street without Joy areas, but lacked the necessary forces to neutralize Base Area 114. Col. Dick continued to screen the CoBi-Than Tan valley with the limited forces available to him. On the morning of 2 January, an 8-man patrol from Company A 3rd Reconnaissance Battalion was landed on a hill 8 km southeast of Camp Evans to observe PAVN movement in the CoBi-Than Tan valley, the reconnaissance Marines did not move from their landing zone and failed to set out claymore mines around their perimeter in the belief that they couldn't be observed. At 17:15 the patrol was attacked by the PAVN, with 6 Marines killed and the 2 survivors escaping overland, arriving at the Marine outpost on Hill 51 the following morning. Later that day, Company D deployed by helicopters to recover the dead reconnaissance Marines, meeting no opposition.

On 7 January, marine air and artillery strikes on PAVN bunkers south of Hill 51 resulted in large secondary explosions. After midnight on 8 January, a Marine night ambush 5 km east of Hill 51 killed five Viet Cong and captured two. On 15 January, airstrikes against PAVN bunkers killed seven PAVN and caused two secondary explosions. On 19 January, a company ambush site observed 36 PAVN moving along Route 554; they were reinforced and called in artillery strikes and then advanced, forcing the PAVN to flee, leaving six dead. Marines captured one PAVN and two VC soldiers on 20 January.

=== Operation Neosho II ===
As part of Operation Checkers, control of the Neosho area of operations and 1/9 Marines transferred to the 1st Marine Regiment which established its headquarters at Camp Evans on 20 January and began Operation Neosho II. On 22 January BLT 2nd Battalion, 4th Marines was landed at Camp Evans and 1/9 Marines was moved to Khe Sanh. On 23 January, 1st Marine Regiment commander Col. Stanley S. Hughes received orders to close down Operation Neosho II the following day and hand over Camp Evans to the 1st Cavalry Division.

== Aftermath ==
Operation Neosho concluded on 20 January 1968. Marine losses were 12 killed, PAVN losses were 77 killed and nine captured.
