= Hảo Sơn village =

Hảo Sơn Village lies in Gio An Commune 8 km from Gio Linh town, Quảng Trị Province, Vietnam. Its economy depends on agriculture. Agricultural products are rice, sweet potato, manioc, pepper, rubber, and watercress, the most important crop.

There are four ancient wells in the village: Gai Well (Ramie Well), Ong well (Men Well), Ba Well (Women Well) and Tep Well (Tiny Shrimp Well). They were built between 10th and 5th century B.C. during the Champa period. They are main irrigation systems for almost all of the communes in the western region of Gio Linh district. Currently, they are recognized as a national cultural heritage.
