= Walter Fillmore =

American Marine Corps officer (1933-2017)

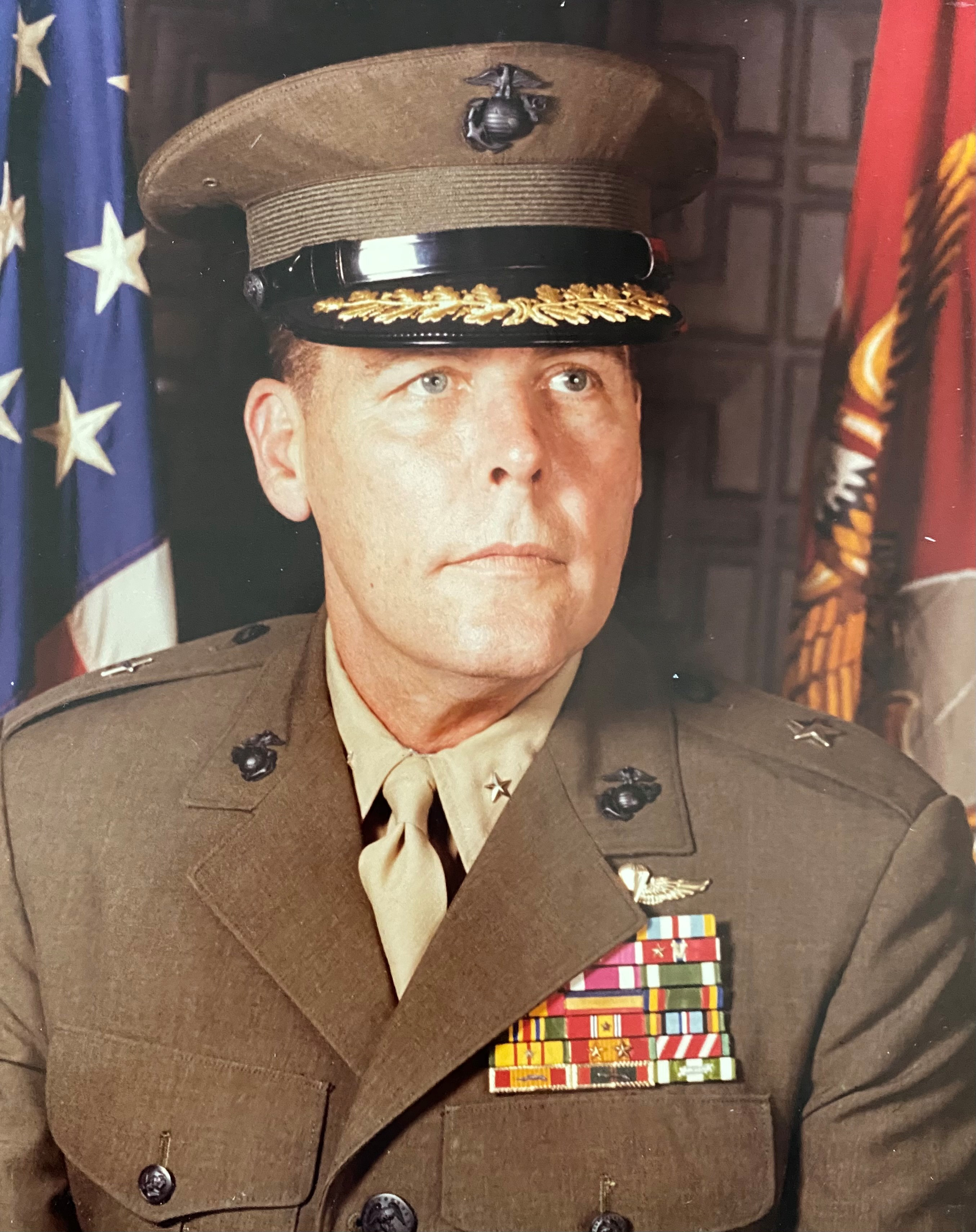
- Born: Walter Daniel Fillmore; January 7, 1933; Baltimore, Maryland, U.S.
- Died: June 25, 2017 (aged 84); Virginia Beach, Virginia, U.S.
- Burial place: Quantico National Cemetery
- Military career
- Allegiance: United States
- Branch: United States Marine Corps
- Rank: O-7 Brigadier General
- Nickname: Dan
- Commands: Deputy Chief of Staff, Plans, Policy, Joint Exercises
- Conflicts: Vietnam War
- Awards: Defense Superior Service Medal; Legion of Merit w/valor device; Bronze Star Medal w/ 1 award star & valor device

Brigadier General Walter Daniel Fillmore (January 7, 1933 – June 25, 2017) was a general officer in the United States Marine Corps.

== Early life ==
Fillmore was born in Baltimore, Maryland, on January 7, 1933, the son of William and Dorothy Fillmore. He studied political science at the University of Rhode Island and later obtained a master's degree in education from Georgia State University.

== Career ==
Fillmore enlisted in the Marine Corps in February 1951. He was commissioned a second lieutenant in December 1953 and served as an infantry platoon commander in Marine Corps Test Unit #1. Fillmore also served with the Marine detachment aboard the USS Bennington. From 1957 to 1963, he was based at Camp Lejeune, North Carolina, and the Navy base at Little Creek in Virginia, serving in various reconnaissance billets. Fillmore completed his airborne training during this time and was also promoted to captain in January 1959. After this time on at the seaboard bases he was sent to Okinawa to serve as a company commander with the 1st Battalion, 9th Marines.

Promotion to major came in September 1965, and Fillmore subsequently served as the executive officer of the 3rd Battalion, 1st Marines in the Vietnam War. Following the war, Fillmore returned to Virginia and was assigned as assistant comptroller and then staff secretary at Headquarters, Fleet Marine Force, Atlantic in Norfolk. While stationed there, he was promoted to lieutenant colonel in November 1968. Following this, Fillmore attended the Armed Forces Staff College in Norfolk from August 1969 until January 1970 and subsequently became an instructor at the Amphibious Warfare School in Quantico, Virginia.

Fillmore returned to Vietnam in May 1972 as assistant senior advisor to the Vietnamese Marine Corps. In June 1973, he returned to the United States and attended the Naval War College, at Newport, Rhode Island. He then became the Marine Corps Representative to the Army Infantry School at Fort Benning, Georgia. It was whilst in this post, in September 1975, that he was promoted to colonel.

In May 1976, Fillmore was reassigned as assistant chief of staff, G-5 (Plans) back at Headquarters, Fleet Marine Force, Atlantic. Two years later, in June 1978, he became special assistant to the chief of staff, Supreme Headquarters, Allied Powers, Europe and transferred overseas. It was whilst serving in this capacity that Fillmore was selected for further promotion, and he became brigadier general in February 1980. As a result of this promotion, he was assigned duty as the deputy director, J-3, U.S. European Command on June 2, 1980. After filling this post for two years, Fillmore once again returned to Norfolk and took the role of deputy chief of staff, plans, policy, joint exercises, CINCLANTFLT on July 13, 1982. General Fillmore served in this capacity until he retired from the Marine Corps on July 1, 1984.

After retiring, Fillmore and his wife, "Bert," settled in Hampton Roads with their five children. He died in Virginia Beach at the age of 84 on June 25, 2017, and was interred in Quantico National Cemetery on July 6, 2017.

== Honors and awards ==

Navy and Marine Corps Parachutist Insignia
Defense Superior Service Medal	Legion of Merit w/ valor device	Bronze Star w/ 1 award star & valor device	Meritorious Service Medal
Navy and Marine Corps Commendation Medal	Navy Presidential Unit Citation	Navy Unit Commendation	Navy Meritorious Unit Commendation
National Defense Service Medal	Vietnam Service Medal w/ 2 service stars	Vietnam Gallantry Cross	Vietnam Civil Actions Medal
Vietnam Staff Service Medal	Vietnam Gallantry Cross unit citation	Vietnam Civil Actions unit citation	Vietnam Campaign Medal
