= Operation Kole Kole =

Part of the Vietnam War (1967)

- Part of the Vietnam War
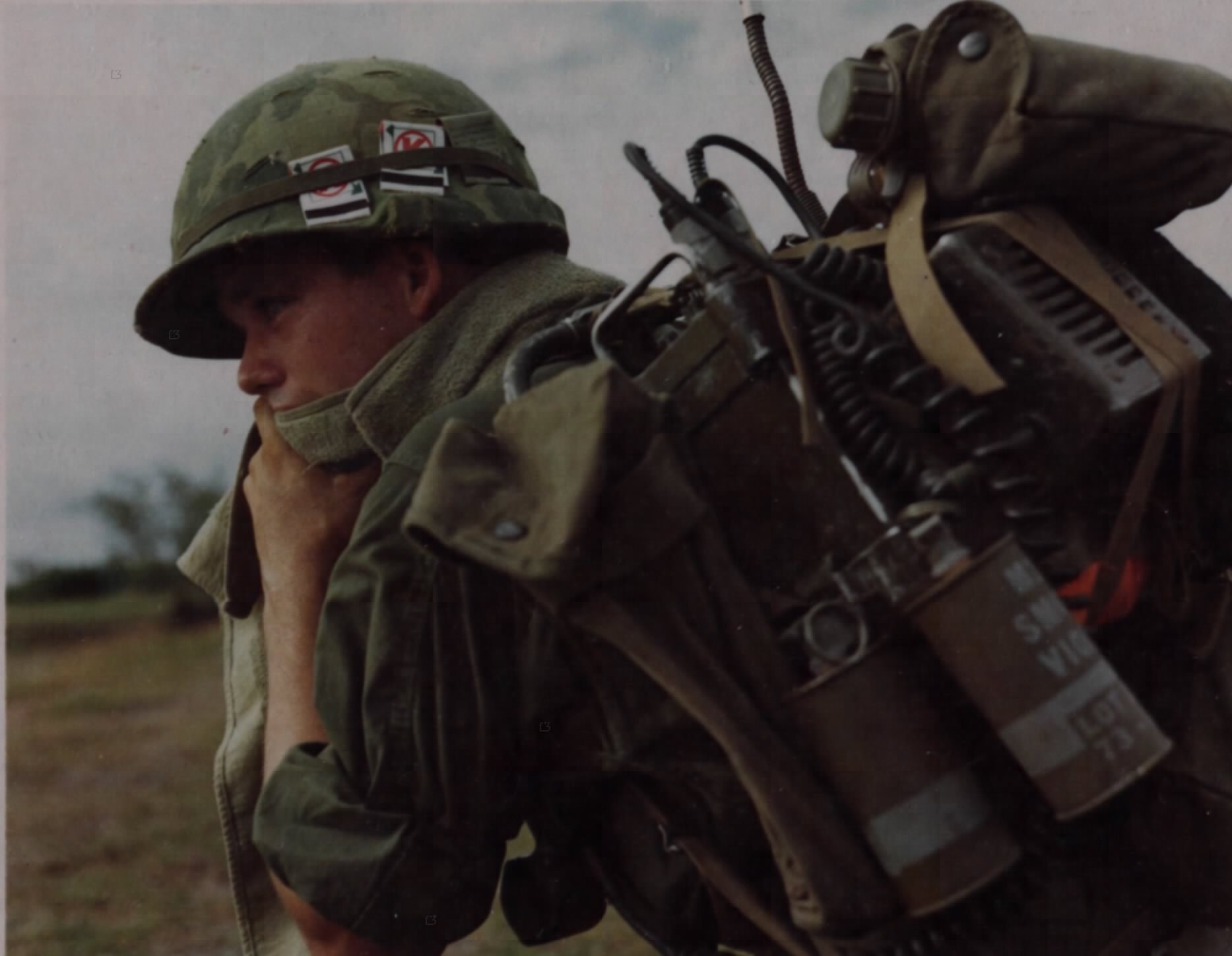
- Radio operator takes a break during the operation
Date	14 May – 7 December 1967
Location	Hậu Nghĩa and Tây Ninh Provinces, South Vietnam
Result	US operational success

Belligerents
United States	Viet Cong

Units involved
2nd Brigade, 25th Infantry Division	

Casualties and losses
158 killed	797 killed 159 captured 34 defected 279 individual and 5 crew-served weapons recovered

Operation Kole Kole was a search and destroy operation during the Vietnam War conducted by the 2nd Brigade, 25th Infantry Division that took place in Hậu Nghĩa and Tây Ninh Provinces, lasting from 14 May to 7 December 1967.

== Background ==
The operation was designed to engage Vietcong (VC) units and interdict infiltration routes.

== Operation ==
A significant action took place when the Combined Reconnaissance Intelligence Platoon (CRIP) consisting of the Reconnaissance Platoon, 1st Battalion, 27th Infantry Regiment and the Hau Nghia Province Intelligence Platoon of Regional Forces) supported by gunships, reacted to intelligence and engaged a VC reconnaissance element from Long An Province, killing 27 VC. During the period from 5–8 August, the 1st Battalion (Mechanized), 5th Infantry Regiment located extensive ammunition caches and arms factories around Loc Giang (grid reference XT426155 (10.992°N 106.305°E)) along the Vàm Cỏ Đông River. Items recovered included over 1000 unfinished anti-personnel mines.

During September the operation shifted to northern Hậu Nghĩa and southern Tây Ninh Provinces, while Army of the Republic of Vietnam (ARVN) operations in southern Hậu Nghĩa Province increased. The 1/5th Infantry conducted extensive dismounted night ambush patrols around Loc Giang and along the Vàm Cỏ Đông River which resulted in 14 VC killed in ten engagements. During the last part of September the 1st and 2nd Battalions, 27th Infantry engaged scattered VC west of the Oriental River resulting in the capture of a VC who revealed the location of the 269th VC Battalion. The 1/27th Infantry conducted airmobile assaults in reaction to this intelligence.

The operation continued through October with emphasis on search and destroy operations, supplemented with pacification operations, in Hậu Nghĩa, Tây Ninh and Bình Dương Provinces. Search and destroy operations were characterized by rapid response to intelligence reports in widely separated areas in the area of operations. On 21 October an estimated VC platoon was observed moving from a base camp south of Tây Ninh, they were fixed in place by gunships until Companies A and B, 1/27th Infantry were airlifted to the area to engage them killing 18. On 31 October the 2/27th Infantry conducted airmobile assaults north of the Rach Tra Stream killing 28 VC and capturing two.

Results of the operation to the end of October were 679 VC killed, 142 captured and 279 individual and five crew-served weapons and 4703 artillery, mortar and RPG rounds captured.

== Aftermath ==
The operation concluded on 7 December 1967. VC losses were 797 killed and 159 captured and 34 Chieu Hoi for US losses of 158 killed.
