= Hậu Nghĩa =

Hậu Nghĩa Phường Hậu Nghĩa
- Ward
- Hậu Nghĩa ward
- Location within Vietnam
- Coordinates: 10°53′44″N 106°23′51″E
- Country: Vietnam
- Region: Mekong Delta
- Province: Tây Ninh
- Time zone: UTC+7 (UTC + 7)

Hậu Nghĩa is a ward (phường) of Tây Ninh Province, Vietnam.

Hậu Nghĩa was originally the village of Bao Trai (Bàu Trai) in Đức Hòa District, Chợ Lớn Province. In 1963, Bao Trai was renamed Khiem Cuong (Khiêm Cương) and became the capital of the newly formed Hậu Nghĩa Province. However, in February 1976, Hậu Nghĩa Province was dissolved and Đức Hòa District was annexed by Long An Province, Khiêm Cương lost its provincial capital status and became the present-day township of Hậu Nghĩa.
