= USS Cayuga =

Three ships in the United States Navy have been named USS Cayuga for one of the six Iroquois tribes.

- USS Cayuga (1861) was a screw steamer launched in 1861 and served during the American Civil War.
- The tug USS Powhatan, acquired by the Navy in 1898, was renamed USS Cayuga in 1917 and served under that name until sold in 1928. As Cayuga, she was later assigned hull number YT-12.
- USS Cayuga (LST-1186) was an amphibious ship launched in 1969 and decommissioned in 1994.

== See also ==
- SS Cayuga – American package freighter in service in the late 19th century
- USS Cayuga County (LST-529) was an LST-491-class tank landing ship built for the United States Navy during World War II.
