= Cam Lộ =

Cam Lộ Xã Cam Lộ
- Commune
- Cam Lộ commune
- Location within Vietnam
- Coordinates: 16°48′31″N 106°59′26″E
- Country: Vietnam
- Region: North Central Coast
- Province: Quảng Trị
- Time zone: UTC+7 (UTC + 7)

Cam Lộ is a commune (xã) of Quảng Trị Province, Vietnam.
