= USS Denver =

Three ships of the United States Navy have been named USS Denver, after the city of Denver, Colorado.

- USS Denver (CL-16) was a cruiser commissioned in 1904 and in service until 1931.
- USS Denver (CL-58) was a light cruiser commissioned 1942 and on active service in World War II, and decommissioned in 1947.
- USS Denver (LPD-9) was an amphibious transport dock commissioned in 1968 and decommissioned in 2014.

== See also ==
- SS James W. Denver was a Liberty ship built in the United States during World War II.
