= USS Comstock =

Two ships of the United States Navy have been named USS Comstock after the Comstock Lode in Nevada. Discovered in 1859, it was one of the richest deposits of precious metals known in the world.

- USS Comstock (LSD-19), was launched 28 April 1945 by the Newport News Shipbuilding and Dry Dock Company in Newport News, Virginia.
- USS Comstock (LSD-45), is a Whidbey Island-class dock landing ship currently in service.
