= 3rd Battalion, 12th Marines =

3d Battalion, 12th Marines
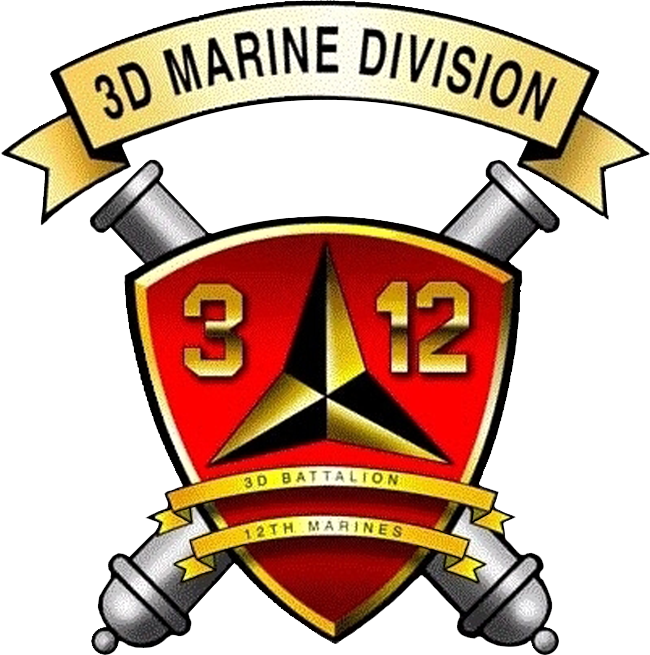
- 3/12 Insignia
- Active: February 1, 1944 - present
- Country: United States of America
- Branch: United States Marine Corps
- Type: Artillery
- Role: Provide fires in support of 3d Marine Division
- Part of: 12th Marine Regiment; 3rd Marine Division
- Garrison/HQ: Camp Hansen, Okinawa, Japan
- Nickname: "Warriors of the Pacific"
- Engagements: World War II * Battle of Guam * Battle of Iwo Jima; Vietnam War; Operation Desert Storm

Commanders
- Current commander: LtCol Frank J. Mastromauro

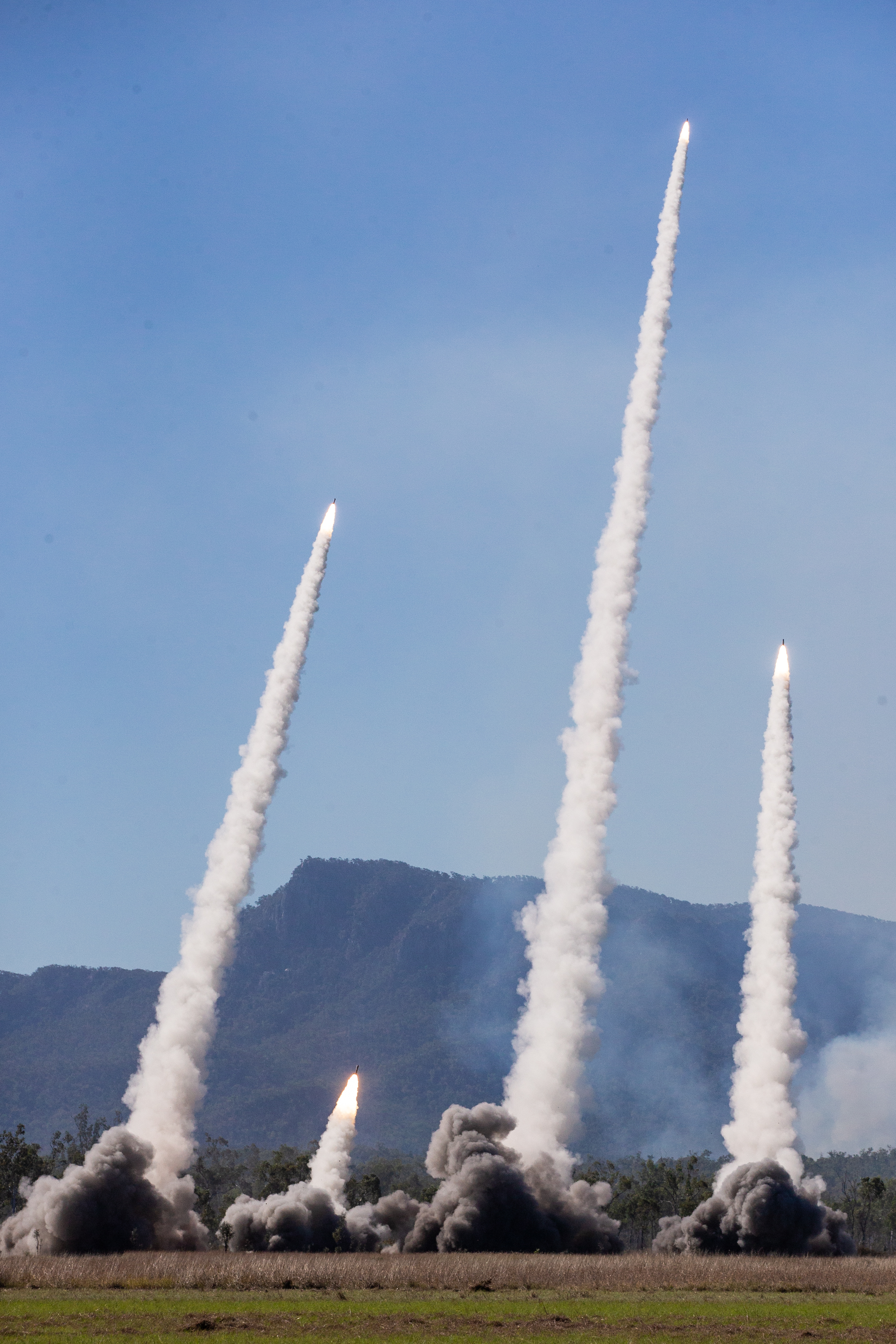
U.S. Marine Corps High Mobility Artillery Rocket Systems with 3d Battalion, 12th Marines, 3d Marine Division, and U.S. Army HIMARS with Alpha Battery, 1st Battalion, 94th Field Artillery Regiment, 12th Field Artillery Brigade, fire H185 RRPRS during Exercise Talisman Sabre 21 on Shoalwater Bay Training Area, Queensland, Australia, July 18, 2021. TS21, the ninth iteration and conducted since 2005, occurs biennially across Northern Australia. Australian, U.S. and other multinational partner forces use Talisman Sabre to enhance interoperability by training in complex, multi-domain operations scenarios that address the full range of Indo-Pacific security concerns. (U.S. Marine Corps photo by Lance Cpl. Ujian Gosun)

3rd Battalion, 12th Marines (3/12) is an artillery battalion comprising four firing batteries and a Headquarters Battery. The firing batteries are not permanently assigned to the battalion- they are all on 6-month rotations in Okinawa from the 10th Marine Regiment and the 11th Marine Regiment (known as the Unit Deployment Program (UDP)). The battalion is stationed at Camp Foster, Okinawa, Japan, and its primary weapon systems are the M777 lightweight howitzer with a maximum effective range of 30 km, along with the M142 High Mobility Artillery Rocket System (HIMARS). The battalion utilizes the Unit Deployment Program to fill its four firing batteries with detachments from artillery units across the Marine Corps.

== Mission ==
3d Battalion, 12th Marines (Rein) Provide fires in support of 3d Marine Division using organic indirect fire assets and counter battery radar while coordinating both lethal and non-lethal fires from other III Marine Expeditionary Force fire support agencies ISO MAGTF, Joint, and Bilateral/Combined Operations in order to Delay, Disrupt, Limit, and Divert the enemy in the Maritime, Land, and Information domains. BPT assess, support, liaise, and advise operations with partner and allied nations.

== Current units ==
- Headquarters Battery
- Four firing batteries rotating on unit deployment program (UDP) assignments from the 10th Marines and the 11th Marines.

== History ==
=== World War II ===
3rd Battalion 12th Marines was activated on September 16, 1942, at Camp Elliott, California, as part of the 3rd Marine Division.

Deployed during January - February 1943 to Auckland, New Zealand

Participated in the following World War II Campaigns Bougainville Northern Solomons Guam Iwo Jima

Deactivated 28 December 1945

=== Reactivation and the Vietnam War ===
Reactivated 7 January 1952 at Camp Pendleton, California, as the 3rd Marine Division

Redeployed during August 1953 to Camp Gifu, Japan

Redeployed during February 1956 to Camp Courtney, Okinawa

Redeployed during April - May 1965 to the Republic of Vietnam

Participated in the war in Vietnam, April 1965 - November 1969, operating from Quang Tri Province Quang Nam Province Thua Thien Province

Redeployed during November 1969 to Camp Courtney, Okinawa

Elements participated in evacuation operations in Vietnam and Cambodia, March - May 1975

India Btry 3/12 deployed and placed in reserve during the Mayaguez Incident May '75

=== 1970s - 1990s ===
Elements participated in Operations Desert Shield and Desert Storm, Southwest Asia, 1990–1991

Elements participated in Operations Sea Angel, Bangladesh, May - June 1991

Elements Participated in Operation Fiery Vigil, Republic of the Philippines, June - July 1991

=== War on Terror ===
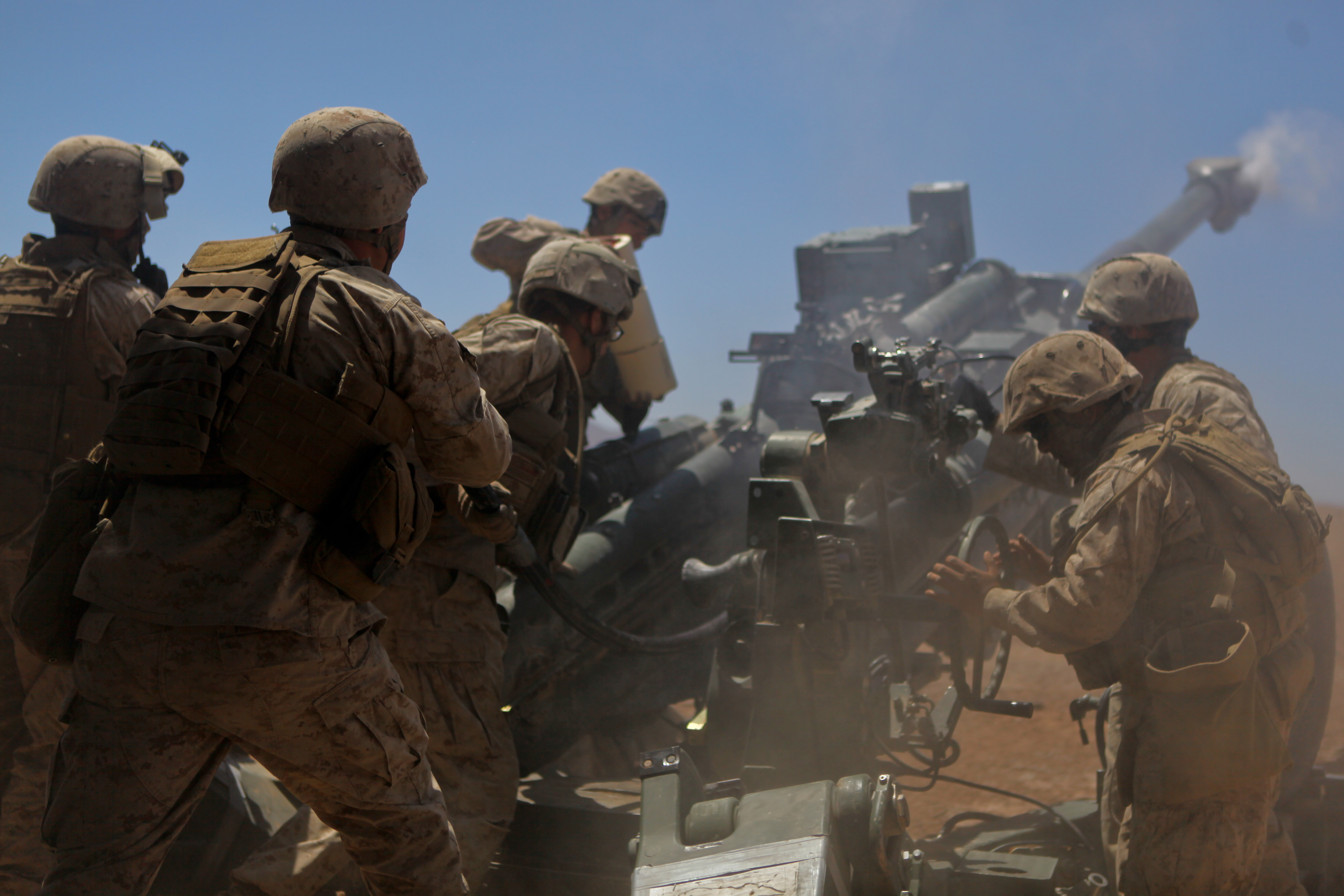
A 3rd Battalion, 12th Marines gun crew during a training exercise in 2013

Elements participated in Operation Enduring Freedom, Afghanistan and Philippines, 2001 into 2009

Elements participated in Operation Iraqi Freedom, Iraq, 2003 into 2007

Elements participated in Operation Unified Assistance, Southeast Asia, December 2004 - February 2005

Elements participated in humanitarian relief efforts, Philippines, February - March 2006

Elements participated in Operation Enduring Freedom, Afghanistan, 2010

== See also ==
- List of United States Marine Corps battalions
- Organization of the United States Marine Corps
