= Gio Linh =

Gio Linh Xã Gio Linh
- Commune
- Gio Linh commune
- Location within Vietnam
- Coordinates: 16°55′22″N 107°04′44″E
- Country: Vietnam
- Region: North Central Coast
- Province: Quảng Trị
- Time zone: UTC+7 (UTC + 7)

Gio Linh is a commune (xã) and capital of Gio Linh District, Quảng Trị Province, Vietnam.
