= Hậu Nghĩa province =

Historic province of Vietnam

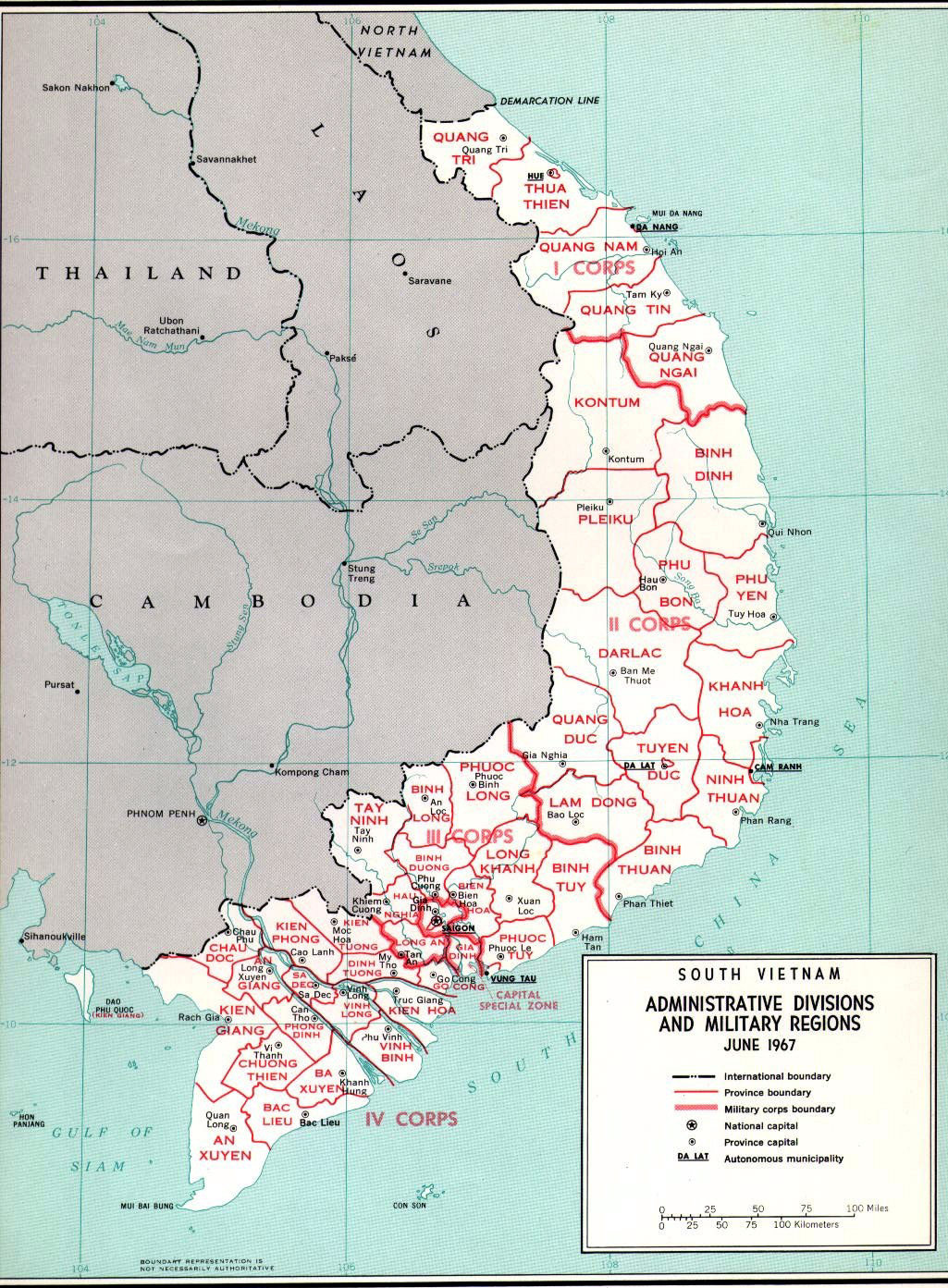
Map of South Vietnam in 1967, showing location of Hậu Nghĩa province

Hậu Nghĩa is former province of South Vietnam, that lay to the west of Saigon and bordered on Cambodia. It was formed on October 15, 1963, by separating land from provinces Long An, Bình Dương and Tây Ninh. Its capital city was Khiêm Cường. It had 4 districts: Củ Chi, Đức Hòa, Đức Huệ and Trảng Bàng.

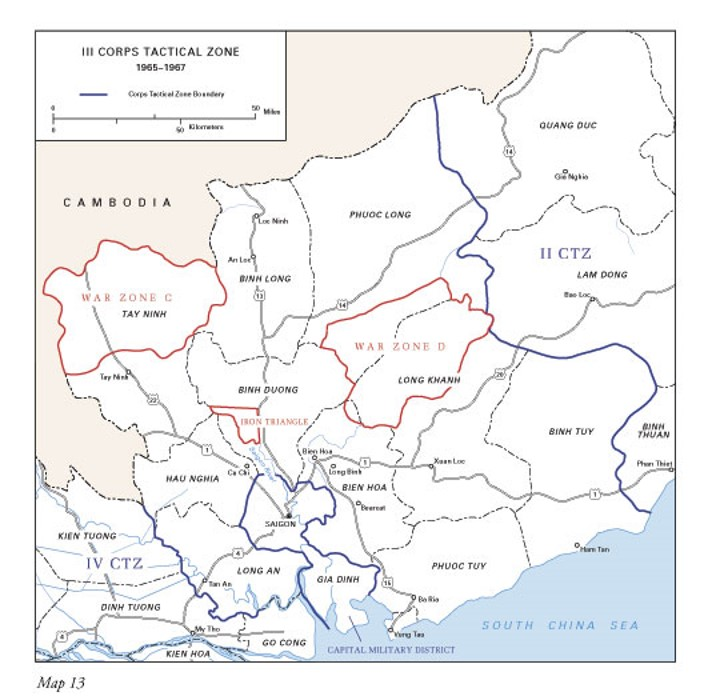
Củ Chi, south of the Iron Triangle

Its eastern district Củ Chi hosted the Củ Chi Base Camp, where the US 25th Infantry Division stationed from January 1966 until February 1970, then the ARVN 25th Infantry Division since 1972 till the end of the Vietnam War.

It was dissolved in February 1976 and land was split amongst three neighboring provinces. Trảng Bàng District was annexed by Tây Ninh province, Củ Chi District was annexed by Ho Chi Minh City, and the districts of Đức Hòa and Đức Huệ were annexed by Long An province. Khiêm Cường, the provincial capital, became the present-day township of Hậu Nghĩa in Đức Hòa District.

The events in Stuart A. Herrington's book "Stalking the Vietcong: Inside Operation Phoenix" took place in this province in 1971.
