= Operation Fremont =

- Part of the Vietnam War
| Date | 7/10/1967 - 10/31/1967 |
| Location | Quang Tri And Thua Thien Provinces |

Belligerents
| United States | North Vietnam |

Units involved
| 4th Marines, 3d Marine Division (HQ, USMC); 1st and 2d Battalions, 3d Marines (USMC); 1st and 2d Battalions, 4th Marines (USMC); 3d Battalion, 26th Marines (USMC) | 806th VC Battalion |
- Search & Destroy Operation

Operation Fremont was a US Marine Corps operation that took place during the Vietnam War The operation was carried out in Quang Tri and Thua Thien Province, from 10 July 1967 to 31 October 1967.
