= Operation Prairie IV =

Part of the Vietnam War (1967)

- Part of the Vietnam War
Date	20 April – 17 May 1967
Location	Vietnamese Demilitarized Zone
Result	US operational success

Belligerents
United States	North Vietnam

Commanders and leaders
Robert E. Cushman, Jr.	Võ Nguyên Giáp

Units involved
1st Battalion, 4th Marines; 1st Battalion, 9th Marines; 2nd Battalion, 9th Marines; 2nd Battalion, 26th Marines	324B Division

Casualties and losses
164 killed	505 killed 9 captured

Operation Prairie IV was an operation conducted by the United States Marine Corps in the area around Con Thien, South Vietnam known as Leatherneck Square from 20 April until 17 May 1967. During the course of the fighting Marine casualties were 164 killed 1,240 wounded while claiming 505 People's Army of Vietnam (PAVN) killed and 9 captured.

== Background ==
PAVN concentrations in the Vietnamese Demilitarized Zone (DMZ) area dictated the reinforcement of the 3rd Marine Division. Responding to the demands of the situation MACV deployed Task Force Oregon to the southern two provinces of I Corps to allow the Marines to reinforce the northern three provinces. As a result of the northward shift of Marine forces, Colonel Robert M. Jenkins' 9th Marine Regiment headquarters moved from Da Nang to Đông Hà Combat Base between 12 and 16 April. At the same time III Marine Amphibious Force (III MAF) moved the 2nd Battalions of the 4th and 26th Marine Regiments from the 1st Marine Division area to the vicinity of Phu Bai Combat Base.

== Operation ==
Operation Prairie IV started on 20 April as a two regiment search and destroy operations, covering the same area as Operation Prairie III. The 3rd Battalion, 3rd Marines and the 3rd Battalion, 9th Marines were placed in the northwest portion of the area of operations. The 9th Marines, using the 1st Battalion, 4th Marines and the 1st Battalion, 9th Marines were to cover the vital piedmont area in and around Quang Tri City. Initially the operation confined all units to relatively fixed positions. Lt Col Wilson's 3/9th Marines was charged with security for Camp Carroll and the Mai Loc Camp. Lt Col Wilder's 3/3rd Marines held the Rockpile and placed companies at Ca Lu Combat Base and Ba Long and was responsible for providing security for the 11th Engineers who kept Route 9 open to Khe Sanh Combat Base. In the 9th Marines area of operations the 1/9th Marines defended Đông Hà and provided one company for security of Cửa Việt Base. The 1/4th Marines protected the engineers clearing the trace between Firebase Gio Linh and Con Thien and provided a company as security for the Gio Linh Composite Artillery battalion.

Although contact with the PAVN was light at the beginning of the operation, reconnaissance reports indicated a PAVN buildup northwest of the Rockpile. Mortar, rocket and artillery attacks continued against Marines clearing the trace as well as against Con Thien and Gio Linh. Attacks on these two positions and 1/4th Marines and the engineers became almost daily affairs and included not only mortar and rocket fire from the southern half of the DMZ, but also medium and heavy artillery fire from a growing number of fortifications north of the Bến Hải River.

On 24 April The Hill Fights broke out in the western sector of the DMZ near Khe Sanh. in conjunction with that attack PAVN forces cut Route 9 between Cam Lộ Combat Base and Khe Sanh repeatedly in an attempt to isolate the Marines in that area. In concert with this effort the PAVN attacked Gio Linh, Camp Carroll and Dong Ha with mortars rockets and artillery. On 27/8 April approximately 850 rounds of artillery, plus 200 mortar rounds hit Gio Linh, while more than 50 140mm rockets hit Đông Hà.

At 03:00 on 8 May some 300 rounds of mortar and artillery fire hit Con Thien, while PAVN sappers with Bangalore torpedoes breached the perimeter wire. At 04:00 two battalions of the PAVN 812th Regiment armed with flamethrowers overran the Marine stronghold. At the time of the attack the base was defended by the command element and Company D, 1/4th Marines. The well organized attack fell primarily on Company D's northern perimeter. Fierce hand-to-hand combat along the perimeter by the outnumbered Marines eventually led to repelling the initial attacking forces. A relief column from Company A was sent with an M42 Duster, 2 LVT-5s and 2 quarter ton trucks. The M42 was hit by an RPG-7 and an LVT-5 and one truck were destroyed by flamethrowers and satchel charges. A large number of casualties were sustained by Marines of A Company. By 09:00 some six hours later the PAVN had withdrawn leaving 197 killed and 8 prisoners. The Marines had suffered 44 killed and 110 wounded.

Following the attack on Con Thien, PAVN activity intensified throughout Leatherneck Square. The number and volume of artillery attacks increased greatly. More than 4200 mortar, rocket and artillery rounds were fired at Marine positions during the May. The PAVN revealed the degree and sophistication of its buildup in the area on 10 May by the destruction of a Marine A-4E Skyhawk flying a radar-controlled mission near the southern boundary of the DMZ. As the jet approached its target, Marines saw 3 surface to air missiles (SAM) fired from positions north of the Bến Hải River. One of the missiles hit the A-4E in the first reported use of PAVN SAMs over South Vietnam.

PAVN ground activity also increased during the period between 13 and 16 May, while clearing Route 561 from Cam Lộ to Con Thien, the 1/9th Marines made contact with a large PAVN force in well-prepared positions south of Con Thien. The PAVN retreated north in to the DMZ only after extreme pressure. Marine and Army of the Republic of Vietnam 1st Division forces then launched Operations Hickory/Lam Son 54/Beau Charger into the southern DMZ.

At the conclusion of Operation Hickory, all participating units joined Prairie IV sweeping Leatherneck Square and the area southwest of Con Thien. On 28 May 3/4 Marines ran into a bunker complex on Hill 174, 6 km southwest of Con Thien. Companies M and L attacked the complex but were forced back by small arms, machine guns, 57mm recoilless rifle and 82mm mortars for the loss of 2 Marines killed and 21 wounded. Artillery hit the hill throughout the night and the next day Companies M and I attacked the hill, suffering 5 KIA and 33 wounded without driving the PAVN from the crest of the hill. Companies M and I attacked unsuccessfully again on 30 May suffering 1 killed and 45 wounded. The PAVN abandoned the hill during the night of 30/31 May.

== Aftermath ==
Operation Prairie IV resulted in 505 PAVN killed and 8 captured for 164 Marines killed and 1240 wounded. The operation was followed by Operation Cimarron in the same area and with the same forces.
