= 2nd Battalion, 26th Marines =

Infantry battalion of the US Marine Corps

- Country: United States of America
- Branch: United States Marine Corps
- Type: Infantry regiment
- Role: Locate, close with and destroy the enemy with fire and maneuver
- Size: 1000
- Part of: Inactive
- Engagements: World War II: Battle of Iwo Jima; Vietnam War: Operation Prairie IV; Operation Hickory; Battle of Khe Sanh; Operation Meade River; Operation Bold Mariner; Operation Taylor Common

The 2nd Battalion, 26th Marines (2/26) is an inactive infantry battalion of the United States Marine Corps. They were part of the 26th Marine Regiment and 5th Marine Division and fought during the Battle of Iwo Jima in World War II. They were activated again for the Vietnam War but were deactivated after the war and remain inactive today.

== History ==
=== Vietnam War ===
On 1 March 1966 the 26th Marine Regiment was activated at Camp Pendleton initiating the formation of the 5th Marine Division. The 26th Marines moved to Okinawa in August. The battalion was landed at Da Nang, South Vietnam on 27 August 1966. On 11 October the battalion moved from Da Nang to Phu Bai Combat Base. After operating for a short period just south of the Phu Bai tactical area of responsibility (TAOR), on 29 October it commenced Operation Pawnee III in Phú Lộc District, north of the strategic Hải Vân Pass, with the mission to keep Route 1 open between Da Nang and Phu Bai.

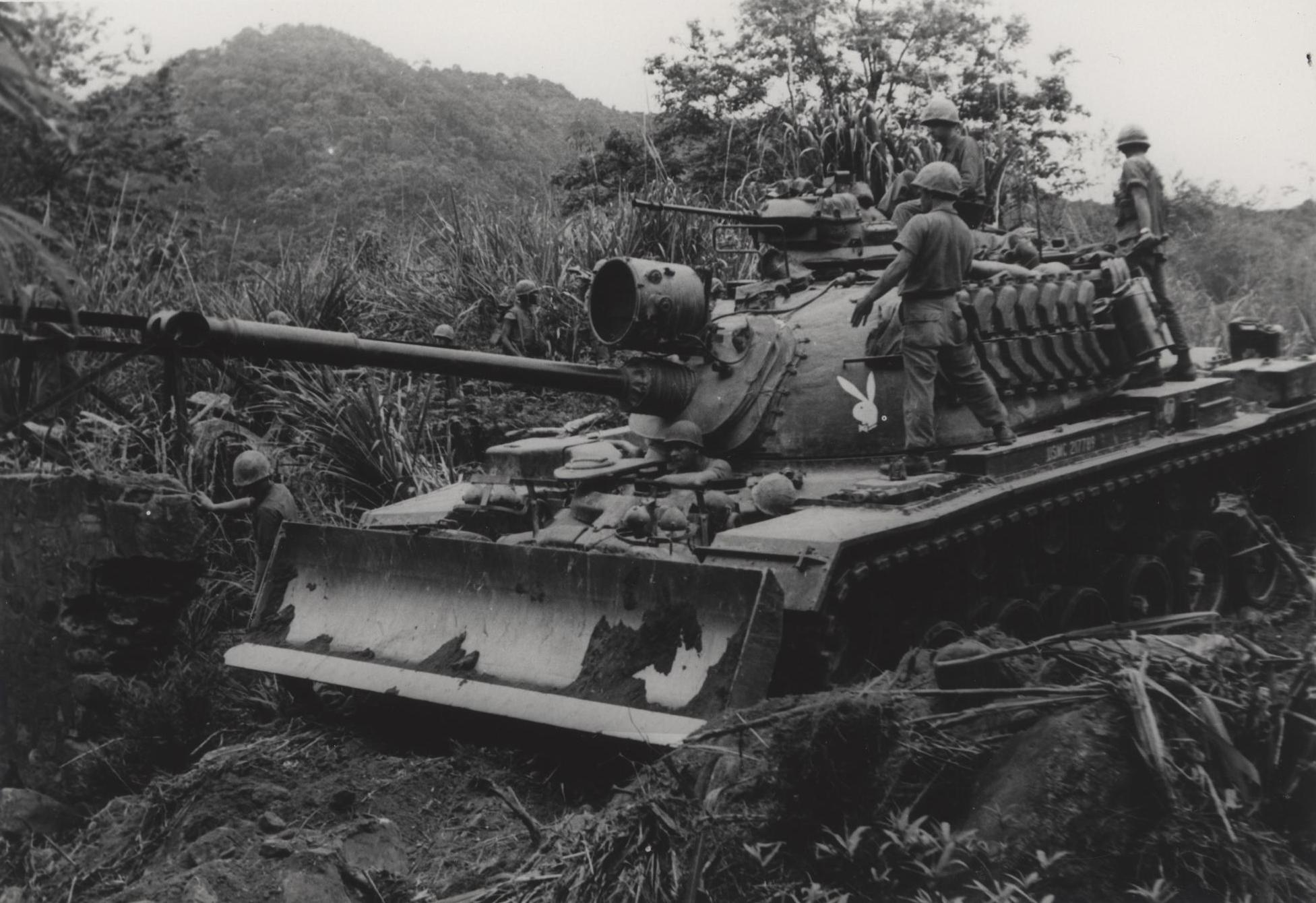
1st Tank Battalion bulldozer tank supports 2/26 Marines operating south of Da Nang, 1967

In mid-April the battalion was moved to Phu Bai. On 15 May the battalion joined Operation Prairie IV and then participated in Operation Hickory in the same area. The battalion was then moved back to Phu Bai to resume security of Route 1 from the Hải Vân Pass north. On 26 December the 1st Battalion 5th Marines assumed responsibility for the Phú Lộc TAOR from the battalion which was intended to move north to Dong Ha Combat Base.

On 16 January the battalion was moved by air to Khe Sanh Combat Base unifying the regiment for the first time in the war. Company F occupied Hill 558 3 km north of the base while the rest of the battalion occupied a strongpoint on the base's northern perimeter. From 21 January 1968 the 26th Marines were under siege at Khe Sanh until the conclusion of Operation Pegasus on 14 April 1968 and were replaced by the 1st Marines on 15 April 1968 with the battalion flying to Quang Tri Combat Base. In May the battalion was deployed into Operation Kentucky defending Con Thien and other locations in Leatherneck Square. The 26th Marines was transferred from the operational control of the 3rd Marine Division to the 1st Marine Division on 18 May 1968. On 28 July the battalion proceeded to Quang Tri Combat Base to prepare and train for service afloat with Special Landing Force (SLF) Alpha. By 8 August the battalion had embarked on board ships of Amphibious Ready Group Alpha and on the 13th was redesignated Battalion Landing Team (BLT) 2/26. On 18 August BLT 2/26 relieved 2nd Battalion 1st Marines in the Vietnamese Demilitarized Zone (DMZ). On 13 September BLT 2/26 was landed at Landing Zone Margo replacing the 3rd Battalion 3rd Marines. On 1 October, BLT 2/26 replaced the 1st Battalion 4th Marines in the DMZ. On 16 October BLT 2/26 was flown to Cửa Việt Base. On 19 October SLF Alpha was embarked on ships and landed at Da Nang on 25 October where they conducted Operations Eager Hunter and Garrard Bay. The battalion participated in Operation Meade River from 20 November to 8 December when they reembarked on ships. From 15 December to 5 January 1969 they conducted Operation Valiant Hunt.

From 12 January to 7 February 1969 BLT 2/26 conducted Operation Bold Mariner with BLT 3/26. On 7 February BLT 2/26 joined Operation Taylor Common. On 29 March the battalion came ashore from BLT duty relieving the 2nd Battalion 7th Marines and 3rd Battalion 7th Marines TAOR west of Da Nang. On 12 June the battalion returned to BLT duty joining SLF Bravo. BLT 2/26 underwent rehabilitation training on Okinawa until 26 June. From 24 July to 7 August BLT 2/26 conducted Operation Brave Armada. On 10 August the battalion again moved ashore replacing the 2/7 Marines west of Da Nang. On 21 September the 5th Marine Division was deactivated however the 26th Marines were assigned to the 1st Marine Division. On 20 September the battalion returned to BLT duty onboard USS New Orleans. On 20 October the battalion again came ashore assuming responsibility for the security of Route 1 in the Hải Vân Pass and the Liên Chiểu Esso Depot (16.142°N 108.129°E).

At the beginning of 1970 the 26th Marines were responsible for the defense of the northern and western approaches to Da Nang. The battalion had companies positioned at the Liên Chiểu Esso Depot, Hải Vân Pass and at Lăng Cô Bridge and Hill 88 (16.2779°N 108.009°E) both north of the pass. The battalion operated mostly in the steep, jungled mountains and left close-in protection of the road and railroad largely to the South Vietnamese Regional Force. As part of Operation Keystone Bluejay the regiment stood down for deactivation in late February to early March with the 1st Marines taking over most of their tactical area of responsibility. On 15 February elements of the 101st Airborne Division relieved the battalion companies stationed at Hill 88 and Lăng Cô Bridge. On 1 March, the 3rd Battalion, 1st Marines relieved the remaining companies at the Liên Chiểu Esso Depot and the Hải Vân Pass. From 11 to 19 March 1970 the 26th Marine Regiment redeployed from South Vietnam and was inactivated.

== Notable former members ==
- George Edward Wahlen, recipient of the Medal of Honor

== See also ==
- History of the United States Marine Corps
- List of United States Marine Corps battalions
