= 4th Marine Regiment =

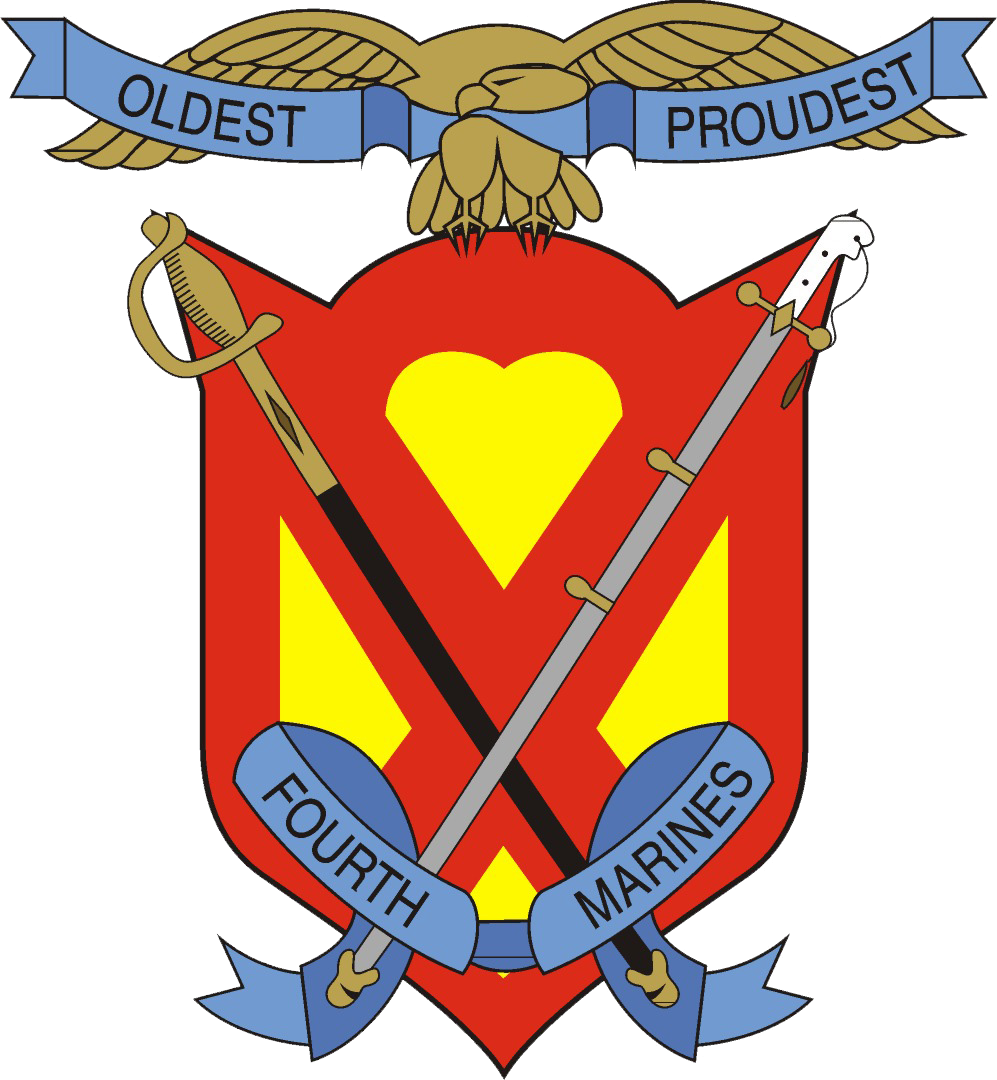
- 4th Marine Regiment insignia
- Active: 1914–1942; 1944–1949; 1952–present
- Country: United States of America
- Branch: United States Marine Corps
- Type: Infantry regiment
- Part of: 3rd Marine Division; III Marine Expeditionary Force
- Garrison/HQ: Camp Schwab, Okinawa
- Nicknames: "The Oldest and the Proudest" or "China Marines"
- Motto: Hold High the Torch
- Engagements: Banana Wars; Occupation of Veracruz; Occupation of the Dominican Republic; World War II; Battle of Corregidor; Battle of Guam; Volcano and Ryukyu Islands campaign; Battle of Okinawa; Vietnam War; Operation Starlite; Operation Hastings; Operation Prairie; Operation Prairie IV; Operation Hickory; Operation Kingfisher; Operation Kentucky; Operation Desert Storm

Commanders
- Current commander: Colonel Erick T. Clark
- Notable commanders: Emile P. Moses; Samuel L. Howard; Alan Shapley; Fred D. Beans; Charles I. Murray; John C. Miller Jr. John H. Masters; Stephen M. Neary

The 4th Marine Regiment is an infantry regiment of the United States Marine Corps. Based at Camp Schwab in Okinawa, Japan, it is part of the 3rd Marine Division of the III Marine Expeditionary Force.

== Mission ==
4th Marine Regiment conducts littoral maneuver to secure or seize key maritime terrain in conjunction with allies and the joint force IOT deter enemy aggressions or to defeat an enemy assault.

== Organization ==
The regimental Headquarters Company is based at Camp Schwab, Okinawa, and is composed of Marine infantry battalions and a LAR company from across the Corps that forward deploy to Okinawa and the 3rd Marine Division for six-month rotations under the Unit Deployment Program.

- Headquarters Company at Camp Schwab, Okinawa.
- UDP Battalion 1 at Camp Schwab, Okinawa
- UDP Battalion 2 at Camp Hansen, Okinawa
- UDP LAR Company at Camp Schwab Okinawa
- UDP Battalion 3 at Camp Schwab, Okinawa. UDP Battalion 3 is attached for six months of the year, the other six months it supports Marine Rotational Force Darwin (MRF-D) and I MEF.

While deployed UDP units are attached to 4th Marine Regiment. 4th Marine Regiment and its attached units are INDOPACOM assigned forces in support of regional OPLANs and CONPLANs.

Currently each of the Regiment's three designated infantry battalions are reinforcing other Marine infantry regiments in the 1st Marine Division.

- 1st Battalion, 4th Marines: attached to 1st Marine Regiment at Camp Pendleton, California.
- 2nd Battalion, 4th Marines: attached to 5th Marine Regiment at Camp Pendleton.
- 3rd Battalion, 4th Marines: attached to 7th Marine Regiment at Twentynine Palms, California.

== History ==
=== Early years ===
The 4th Marine Regiment was first activated on 16 April 1914, in Puget Sound, Washington, & Mare Island, California Naval Yards, under the command of Colonel Joseph Henry Pendleton. This activation was a direct result of deteriorating relations between the United States and Mexico. On 21 April, President Woodrow Wilson ordered U.S. Naval Forces to Vera Cruz. Shortly after activation, 4th Marines embarked upon the USS South Dakota (ACR-9) headed for San Francisco. Upon their arrival they received four companies (the 31st, 32nd, 34th and 35th) which were to become attached to the regiment. The regiment then sailed for Mexico.

On 28 April, 4th Marines arrived in Acapulco harbor. Reinforcements subsequently arrived in Mazatlán a week and half later. The regiment continued to maintain a presence in Mexican waters patrolling the shore through May and June. However, by the end of June no landing had been deemed necessary and tensions had eased between Mexico and the United States. Shortly thereafter 4th Marines withdrew from Mexican waters and concluded their first Latin American expedition. The regiment returned to San Diego to establish its new home base. Between this time and February 1916 the regiment conducted several missions of force projection off the coast of Mexico. None had required the Marines to actually disembark as diplomatic relations were subsequently smoothed over upon their arrival or shortly thereafter.

The Dominican Republic broke out in civil war in the spring of 1916. American forces were sent to quell the danger posed to Americans and other foreigners there. As the Americans came ashore the rebels withdrew from Santo Domingo, the capital, to Santiago where they had established another rival government. American forces called for reinforcements and 4th Marines was called into action. They left San Diego on 6 June for New Orleans. Three days later they boarded the USS Hancock (AP-3) for the Dominican Republic.

=== China Marines ===
Disorder and civil war that had long been troubling China flared in the mid 1920s with the foreign community in Shanghai, where fighting between opposing Chinese forces became active, demanding a more permanent protective force. The United States had landed Marines twice in 1925, but in 1927 nationalist forces were on the verge of taking the city and the United States responded with a small force of about 340 Marines sent from Guam followed by the 4th Marine Regiment less the 2d Battalion sailing from San Diego on 3 February 1927 embarked in USS Chaumont. The embarked 3d Battalion, commanded by then Major Alexander Vandegrift, was held aboard the transport at State Department direction until a declaration of emergency by the Municipal Council of the international Settlement was declared on 21 March. Once landed, the Marines shortly came under the command of Brigadier General Smedley Butler as Marine Corps Expeditionary Force, United States Asiatic Fleet. They joined forces of seven other nations in the internal defense of the settlement, with orders to not come into conflict with Chinese troops. They were not deployed to the perimeter barricades though they did support international forces that were so deployed. By June additional forces, including 2d Battalion, 4th Marine Regiment as part of a newly activated Provisional Regiment, had arrived in China and been sent to Tianjin. By the time that force arrived the threat to the international settlement in Shanghai had eased and the combined forces of the American, British, Dutch, French, Italian, Japanese, Portuguese, and Spanish were seen as sufficient.

The 4th Marine Regiment was reduced in strength in October 1927 with the 2d Battalion at Tianjin becoming 2d Battalion, 12th Marines and the Provisional Regiment dissolved. (Note: Note from Santelli, p. 14: "With this redesignation 2/4's lineage and honors were transferred to 2/12. However, a new 2/4 would be activated in the future, but for lineage and honors purposes it would in no way be connected to the old 2d Battalion, 4th Regiment.") The 4th regiment settled into routine garrison duty during which it gained the nickname "China Marines" and a unique feature, the only fife and drum corps in the Corps. The formation of the Fessenden Fifes was a result of influence of the American chairman of the Shanghai Municipal Council and Civil Commandant of the Shanghai Volunteer Corps, Stirling Fessenden, and instruments from the 1st Battalion, Green Howards whose fifers and drummers taught the Marines to play. Reductions continued and on 14 January 1928 the 4th Regiment was detached from the withdrawing Marines of the brigade and on 13 February 1930 the regiment gained its designation as 4th Marines.

The quiet was ended in January 1932 when Japanese forces in Manchuria began seizing Chinese territory in late 1931 and bloody clashes between Chinese and Japanese civilians erupted in Shanghai that month. The 4th Marines were deployed to prevent fighting from spilling into the International Zone. By 4 February Marines had been reinforced by Marines from the Philippines, the Marine detachment of the USS Houston and the United States Army 31st Infantry Regiment. On 3 March 1932 an agreement was reached between combatants, the state of emergency in the International Zone was ended 13 June 1932 and the 4th Marines returned to garrison duty while the 31st Infantry returned to the Philippines. The Commander in Chief, Asiatic Fleet, recommended the 4th Marines be brought up to full strength and a new 2d Battalion was activated 18 September 1932 bringing the unit for the first time in five years to a full three battalion strength until deactivation of the 3d Battalion 19 December 1934. Garrison duty was interrupted during the few tranquil following years only by duty aboard vessels of the Yangtze Rapid Steamship Company November 1933 – July 1935 protecting the ships from pirates on voyages into the interior.

The commanding officer of 4th Marines, then Colonel John C. Beaumont, was one of only two people in China--the other being the naval attaché in Beijing, Commander Thomas M. Shock--to know the actual mission William A. Worton was undertaking for the Office of Naval Intelligence in attempting to penetrate Japan with agents from China. Worton, who had served as a Marine in China 1922—1926, 1927–1929, and 1931–1935 and been commended for his intelligence work by General Butler during Butler's 1927–1929 command of the 4th, arrived during the summer of 1935 to recruit and run agents until his turn over and return to the United States in June 1936.

The peaceful years ended 7 July 1937 when Japanese incursions resulted in an incident at the Marco Polo Bridge used by Japan to send more troops into China. After Japanese military personnel were killed in Shanghai Japanese warships were sent to the city with landing of troops and movement of Chinese troops into the city. The 4th Marines were deployed with orders to prevent either side from entering the American sector "by means other than rifle fire." Again the 4th Marines were reinforced, this time by the 2d Marine Brigade (Note: Composition (Santelli): "The brigade, arriving at Shanghai on 19 September, was composed principally of the following organizations: the headquarters element; Battery F, 2d Marine Anti—Aircraft Battalion; and the 1st and 2d Battalions, 6th Marines.") under Brigadier General John C. Beaumont, the units former commanding officer, to which the 4th Marines were attached.

Fighting around the city ended with Japanese forces in full control and the 2d Marine Brigade less the 4th Marines was withdrawn 17 February 1938 leaving these "China Marines" alone to deal with Japanese interests now trying to undermine the Western powers in the International Zone. Their position was compromised by the fact other Western foreign powers had also reduced their forces and by war in Europe in 1939 in which Italy was aligned with the Axis with Japan and Germany, France by June was defeated and ordered by the Vichy Government to cooperate with Japan and the British withdrew due to war needs elsewhere—leaving the 4th Marines alone to oppose Japanese ambitions. The unit had been further reduced by separations from the service with replacements diverted at the direction of the 4th's commander to the 1st Special Defense Battalion in the Philippines so that it consisted of only two battalions, each with only two rifle companies of two platoons each and one machine gun company.

=== World War II ===
==== Withdrawal from China ====
The United States began considering complete withdrawal and Commander in Chief, Asiatic Fleet, Admiral Thomas C. Hart began withdrawal of units along the coast and recommended withdrawal of the 4th Marines as he felt war was inevitable. On 10 November 1941 permission to withdraw the 4th Marines was given and put into effect. 1st Battalion and part of the Headquarters sailed for the Philippines on 27 November embarked in the chartered liner President Madison with the remainder of the 4th Marines embarking in President Harrison and sailing for the Philippines on 28 November 1941 with the first elements arriving at Subic Bay 30 November and the remainder the next day.

Sometimes associated with 4th Marines is the paleontological and anthropological mystery of loss of the Peking Man fossils. (Note: The subject is mentioned in both non-fiction and subject of fictional stories that mention the Marines as being with the 4th Marines—as in the case of the following reference. The Marines were specifically the Legation Guard Marines assigned to north China.) The Chinese authorities requested the United States ambassador's help in evacuating the fossils and the custodians records indicate the fossils were crated and taken to the United States Legation in Beijing. There a detachment of Marines, sometimes associated with the 4th but actually the Legation Guard Marines from Beijing and Tianjin (North China Marines), were to escort the crates to the Marine compound at Tianjin and evacuated aboard President Harrison which was to evacuate remaining military and civilians. The Japanese attack on Pearl Harbor came between the arrival of the crates at the Legation and the rest of the plan's execution. President Harrison had completed the first evacuation of 4th Marines and was headed back leaving Manila on 4 December for Qinhuangdao to evacuate about 300 Legation Guard Marines from Beijing and Tianjin but the ship was shadowed by Japanese forces and eventually ordered to stop. To prevent capture of President Harrison, now outfitted to carry troops, Master Orel A. Pierson decided to run aground in hopes of destroying the ship but the ship was salvaged, the crew taken prisoner and the ship refitted by the Japanese to eventually become Kachidoki Maru that was sunk with British prisoners of war by USS Pampanito on 12 September 1944. The Legation Marines were taken prisoner and the crates with the fossils disappeared into the chaos of the war. The question of what happened to the crates of fossils is one of the frequent and unanswerable questions posed to the Marine Corps historians.

==== The Philippines ====
The 4th Marines absorbed the Marine Barracks Olongapo on 22 December 1941 to fill out the 1st and 2nd Battalions to three rifle companies of three platoons each, then added the 1st Separate Marine Battalion at Cavite to create the 3rd Battalion.

The 4th Marines then were moved to Corregidor where on 10 April 1942 it added the Provisional Naval Battalion as the regiment's 4th Battalion. The 4th Battalion was composed of U.S. Navy personnel that had previously served during the Battle of Bataan. Most of the battalion's sailors were crew members of the disabled submarine tender USS Canopus.

When the Japanese defeated allied forces in Bataan on 9 April 1942, they shifted their focus to Corregidor Island. The island was essential to the invading Japanese forces, as it was the last remaining obstacle to Manila Bay, known as the finest harbor in the Orient.

The regiment was composed of troops from 142 different U.S. and Filipino organizations with nearly 4,000 men with the regiment occupied the island at the time, but more than half were Army and Navy personnel without ground combat training. Approximately 1,500 U.S. Army and Philippine Scouts personnel reinforced the regiment during the defense of Corregidor, designated as the Reserve Battalion.

On 5 May, Japanese soldiers landed on the island and faced fierce resistance from American and Filipino artillery, but with persistence the Japanese forces etched their way deeper into allied territory and eventually overcame one of the regiment's artillery batteries. Early the next day, Japanese tanks made it to shore.

Army Lt. Gen. Jonathan Wainwright, the commander of U.S. forces in the Philippines under Gen. Douglas MacArthur, realized his men's defeat was imminent. Just a day after the invasion, he surrendered for fear that the more than 1,000 wounded troops would be captured or killed. The 4th Marine Regiment was utterly destroyed, and only a few surviving Marines and personnel made up what was left of the regiment. The regiment was subsequently dissolved under control of its own accord. The commander of 4th Marines ordered the burning of the colors before they made their hasty evacuation.

==== Rebirth ====
By 1 February 1944, four Marine Raiders battalions were amalgamated into a re-established 4th Marine Regiment, bearing the name and honors of the original 4th Regiment lost in the Philippines in 1942. The 1st, 4th, and 3rd Raider Battalions became respectively the 1st, 2nd, and 3rd Battalions, 4th Marines. The 2nd Raider Battalion became the regimental weapons company. 4th Marines, combined with the 22nd Marine and the 29th Marine Regiment, was assigned to the 6th Marine Division and fought at Guam and Okinawa.

Following the surrender of Japan, the 4th Marines were assigned to guard the Japanese Navy Base at Yokosuka near Tokyo. The 4th Marines performed this duty from 2 September 1945 to 14 February 1946 when the 6th Marine Division was deactivated, also dissolving the regiments under its operational command.

=== Korean War ===
In 1951 the 4th Marines were reactivated at Camp Pendleton, carrying lineage of both the old and new 4th Regiments. The regiment was assigned to the 3rd Marine Division and moved to Japan in 1952 where it remained until after the Korean Armistice Agreement was signed on 27 Jul 1953. The 4th Marines were sent to Korea on 23 August 1953 to defend South Korea in the event hostilities resumed and returned to the Japan on 27 July 1954. Although they saw no combat, the 4th Marines are entitled to fly the Korean Service streamer from their regimental colors.

When the 3rd Marine Division relocated to Okinawa in 1955, the 4th Marines moved to Marine Corps Base Hawaii where they remained until being deployed to Vietnam in 1965.

=== Vietnam War ===
The 4th Marines served in the I Corps region of South Vietnam as part of the 3rd Marine Division, under the III Marine Amphibious Force. They landed in the spring and summer of 1965 near Chu Lai. The regimental headquarters was first at Da Nang, then in 1966 the HQ was moved to Phu Bai. In 1967 the regiment made its final move to Đông Hà, just below the Demilitarized Zone (DMZ). There the regiment participated in many large operations throughout Quang Tri Province from the South China Sea to the Laotian Border along the southern half of the DMZ. During this period of time the 4th Marines were also providing security for the construction of the McNamara Line. Some of the major operations that the regiment was involved in were Operation Starlite ( 17–24 August 1965), Operation Hastings (15 July – 3 August 1966) and Operation Prairie (3 August – 27 October 1966). Other major operations in 1967 and 1968 were Operation Prairie IV (20 April – 17 May 1967), Operation Hickory ( 18–28 May 1967), Operation Kingfisher (16 July – 31 October 1967) and Operation Kentucky (1 November 1967 – 28 February 1969). The two major enemy units they battled over those years were the 324B NVA Division and the 320th NVA Division. The regiment left South Vietnam in November 1969 with 10 Marines and 1 Hospital Corpsman having received the Medal of Honor.

=== Okinawa ===
In 1972 the 4th Marines were sent to Okinawa to serve as part of the 3rd Marine Division. Except for operational deployments, the 4th Marines have served in Okinawa through 2019.

=== Gulf War ===
During the Gulf War (1990 to 1991) HQ Co deployed to Saudi Arabia as RCT-4. Initially assigned as Rear Area Security for I MEF at the port of Al Jubayl, in January of 1991 HQ Co along with 2nd Battalion, 7th Marines and 3rd Battalion, 7th Marines were designated as Task Force Grizzly. Commanded by Colonel James Fulks, TF Grizzly were the first Coalition Forces to Cross the Border into Kuwait. TF Grizzly eventually took Al Jaber Airfield in Kuwait. 2nd Battalion, 4th Marines was attached to the 8th Marines as part of the 2nd Marine Division. In March 1991 it participated in the Liberation of Kuwait as part of Operation Desert Storm.

== Unit awards ==
A unit citation or commendation is an award bestowed upon an organization for the action cited. Members of the unit who participated in said actions are allowed to wear on their uniforms the appropriate ribbon of the awarded unit citation. 4th Marines have been awarded the following:

Streamer	Award	Year(s)	Additional Info
	Presidential Unit Citation Streamer with one Bronze Star	1945, 1965–1967	Okinawa, Vietnam War
	Presidential Unit Citation Streamer with one Bronze Oak Leaf Cluster	1941–1942	Philippine Islands
	Navy Unit Commendation Streamer with three Bronze Stars	1944, 1975, 1990–1991, 2002–2003	Guam, Vietnam, Southwest Asia, Western Pacific
	Mexican Service Streamer	1914	Vera Cruz Expedition
	Dominican Campaign Streamer	1916	Dominican Republic
	Marine Corps Expeditionary Streamer with one Bronze Star		
	World War I Victory Streamer with "WEST INDIES"	1917-1918	
	Yangtze Service Streamer	1927, 1930-1932	
	China Service Streamer with one Bronze Star	1937-1939, 1946	
	American Defense Service Streamer with one Bronze Star	1939-1941	World War II
	Asiatic-Pacific Campaign Streamer with one Silver and two Bronze Stars	1941-1942, 1944-1945	
	World War II Victory Streamer	1941–1946	Pacific Theater
	Navy Occupation Service Streamer with "ASIA"	1946	Japan
	National Defense Service Streamer with three Bronze Stars	1950–1954, 1961–1974, 1990–1995, 2001–present	Korean War, Vietnam War, Gulf War, war on terrorism
	Korean Service Streamer	1953-1954	No combat service
	Armed Forces Expeditionary Streamer		
	Vietnam Service Streamer with two Silver and one Bronze Stars		
	Southwest Asia Service Streamer with two Bronze Stars	1991	Saudi Arabia, Kuwait
	Global War on Terrorism Service Streamer	2001–present	
	Philippine Defense Streamer	1941–1942	Defense of Philippine Islands
	Philippine Republic Presidential Unit Citation Streamer	1941–1942	Defense of Philippine Islands
	Vietnam Gallantry Cross with Palm Streamer		

== See also ==
- China Marines
- Organization of the United States Marine Corps
- List of United States Marine Corps regiments
