= Operation Bold Mariner =

Part of the Vietnam War (1969)

- Part of the Vietnam War
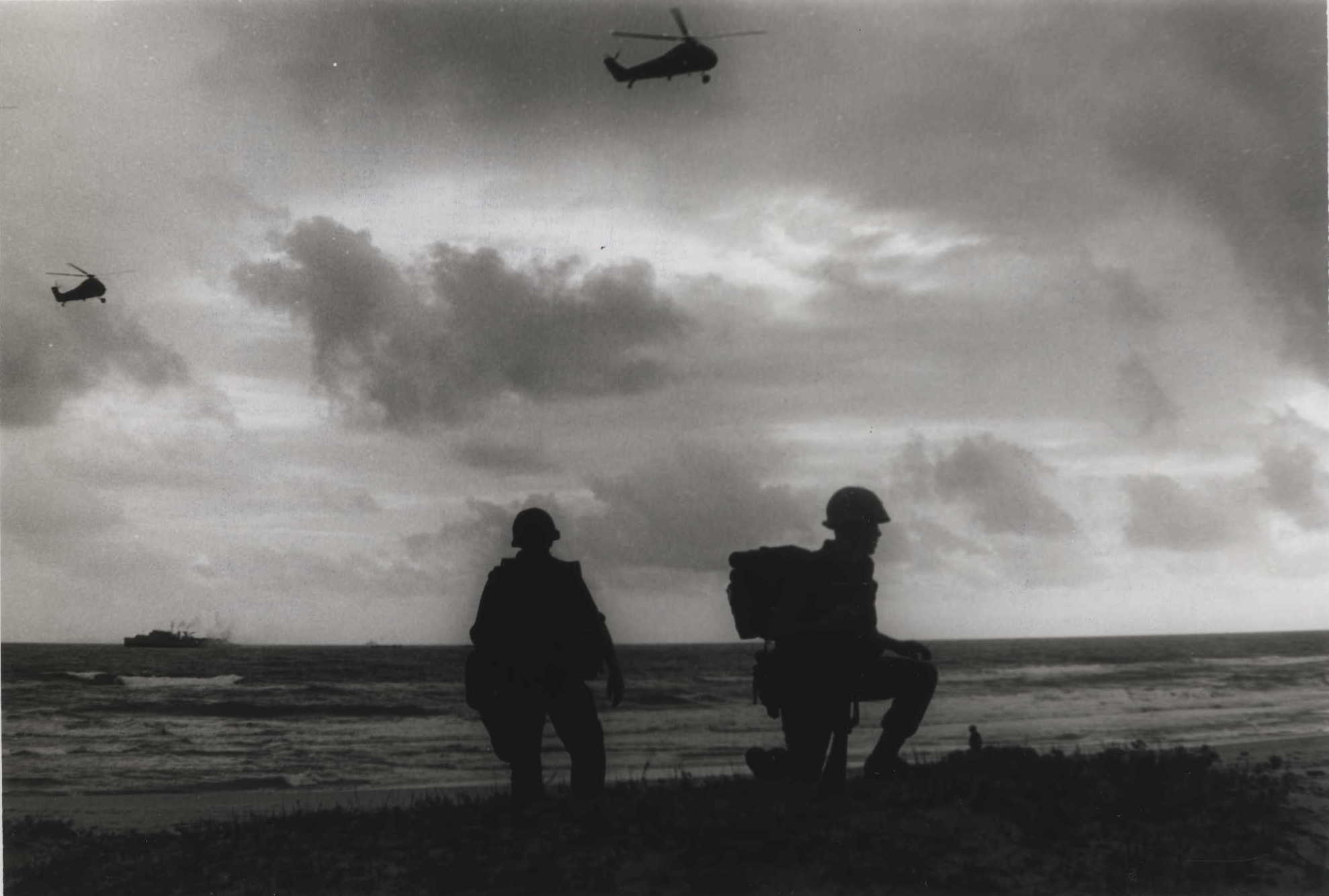
- Marines of the 26th Marines wait for the word to ‘move out’ after coming ashore to begin Operation Bold Mariner
| Date | 12 January – 7 February 1969 |
| Location | Batangan Peninsula, Quảng Ngãi Province, South Vietnam 15.219°N 108.913°E |
| Result | U.S. victory |

Belligerents
| United States | Viet Cong |

Units involved
| BLT 2nd Battalion, 26th Marines; BLT 3rd Battalion, 26th Marines | 38th VC Main Force Regiment; 48th VC Local Force Battalion; P-31st Local Force Company; C-95th Sapper Company |

Operation Bold Mariner was a US Marine Corps operation that took place on the Batangan Peninsula southeast of Chu Lai, lasting from 12 January to 7 February 1969.

== Background ==
The peninsula was believed to be supporting elements of the Viet Cong (VC) 38th Main Force Regiment, the 48th Local Force Battalion, P-31st Local Force Company and C-95th Sapper Company all of which posed a threat to Quảng Ngãi and allied forces in the area. The operation was planned to be the Marine Corps' largest amphibious assault since the Korean War with Battalion Landing Team (BLT) 2nd Battalion, 26th Marines and BLT 3rd Battalion, 26th Marines assaulting the north of the peninsula by helicopter and landing craft while the 23rd Infantry Division's Task Force Cooksey, composed of elements of the 46th Infantry Regiment and 1st Cavalry Regiment and the Army of the Republic of Vietnam (ARVN) 2nd Division launching Operation Russell Beach to seal off the southern boundary.

== Operation ==
On 12 January the Marines conducted a feint against Mộ Đức District approximately 20 km south of the operation area.

At 07:00 on 13 January the Marines landed on the peninsula meeting negligible resistance. Once ashore the Marines linked up with Task Force Cooksey and then pushed east forcing the VC towards the sea. While encounters with the VC were minimal, the Marines encountered extensive networks of mines, booby-traps and fortifications. On 19 January 2/26 Marines captured 56 Vietnamese of military age, under interrogation they were found to be members of the C-95th Sapper Company. The Marines evacuated numerous civilians for screening, eventually totaling some 11,900 people.

On 24 January 2/26 Marines returned to their amphibious assault ships.

Following the conclusion of the assault phase, Operation Russell Beach continued with Marine combined action teams, the 46th Infantry Regiment and the ARVN 6th Regiment operating to cleanse the peninsula of VC/People's Army of Vietnam forces.

== Aftermath ==
The operation concluded on 7 February. During the operation the population was largely removed from the peninsula during the assault phase and a clear and search operation was followed by the construction of new roads and hamlets. The population was allowed to return in April 1969 together with South Vietnamese government institutions

== Gallery ==
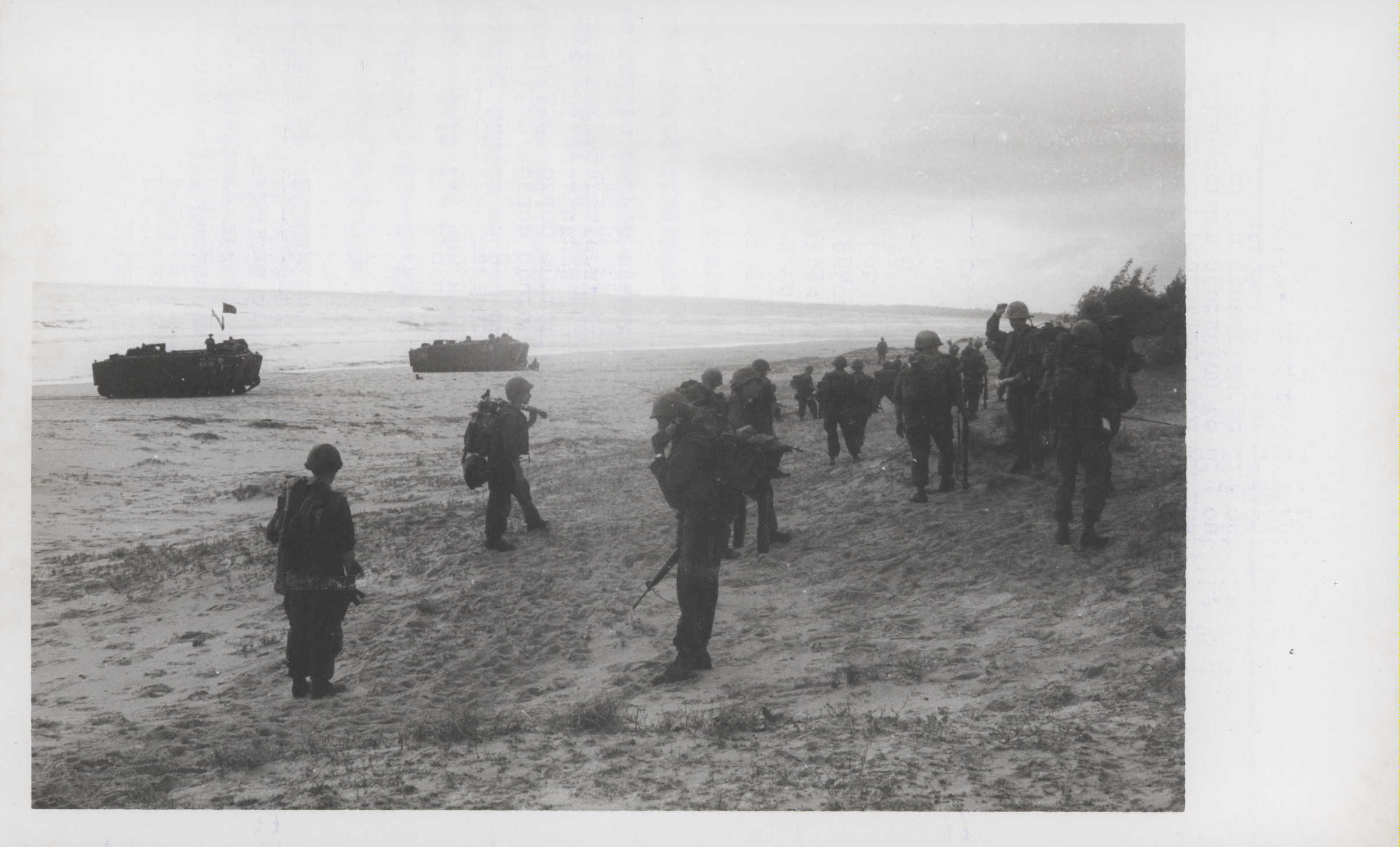
Marines of the 26th Marines wait for the word to deploy after coming ashore

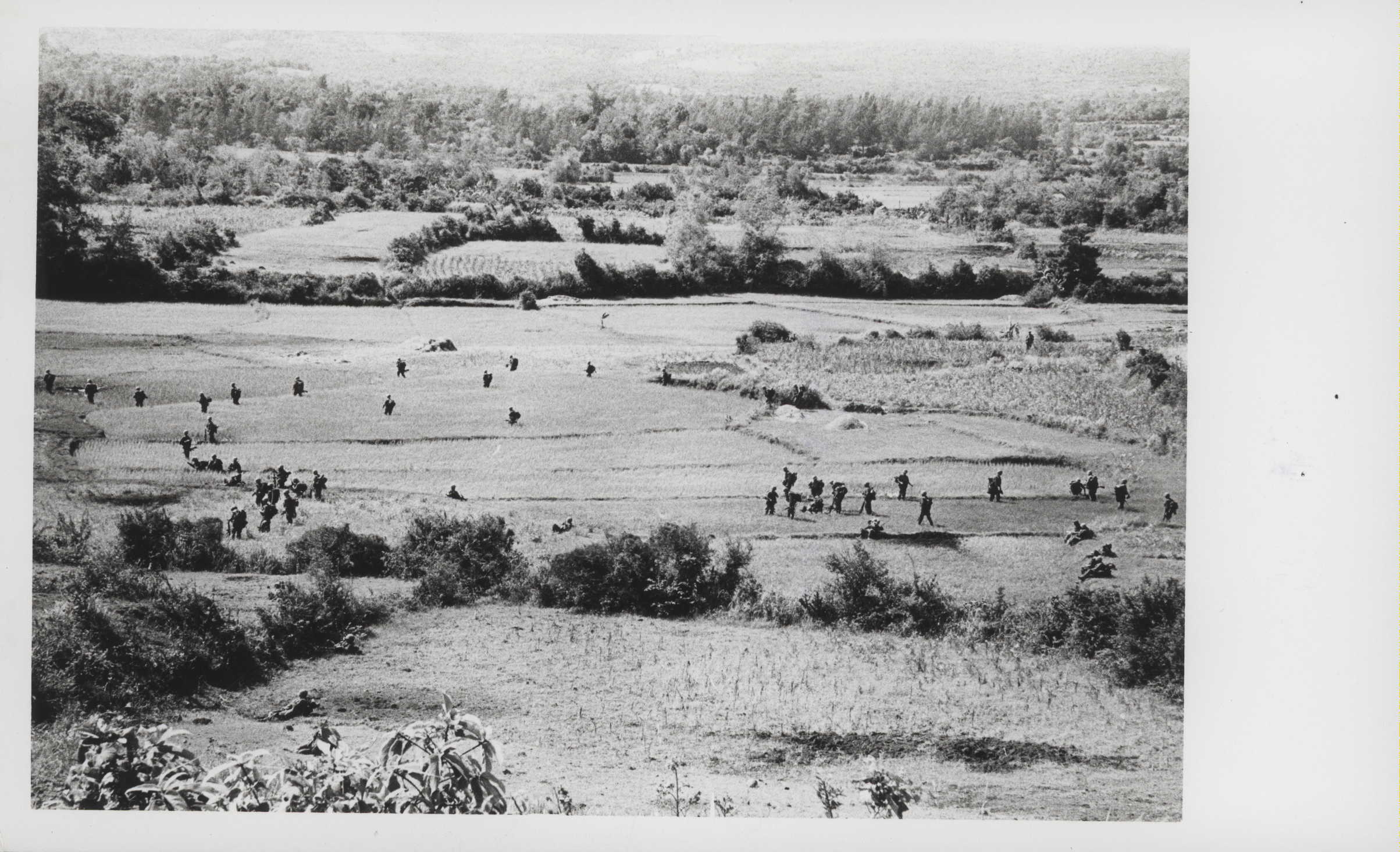
2/26 Marines prepare to form an assault line on Hill 37

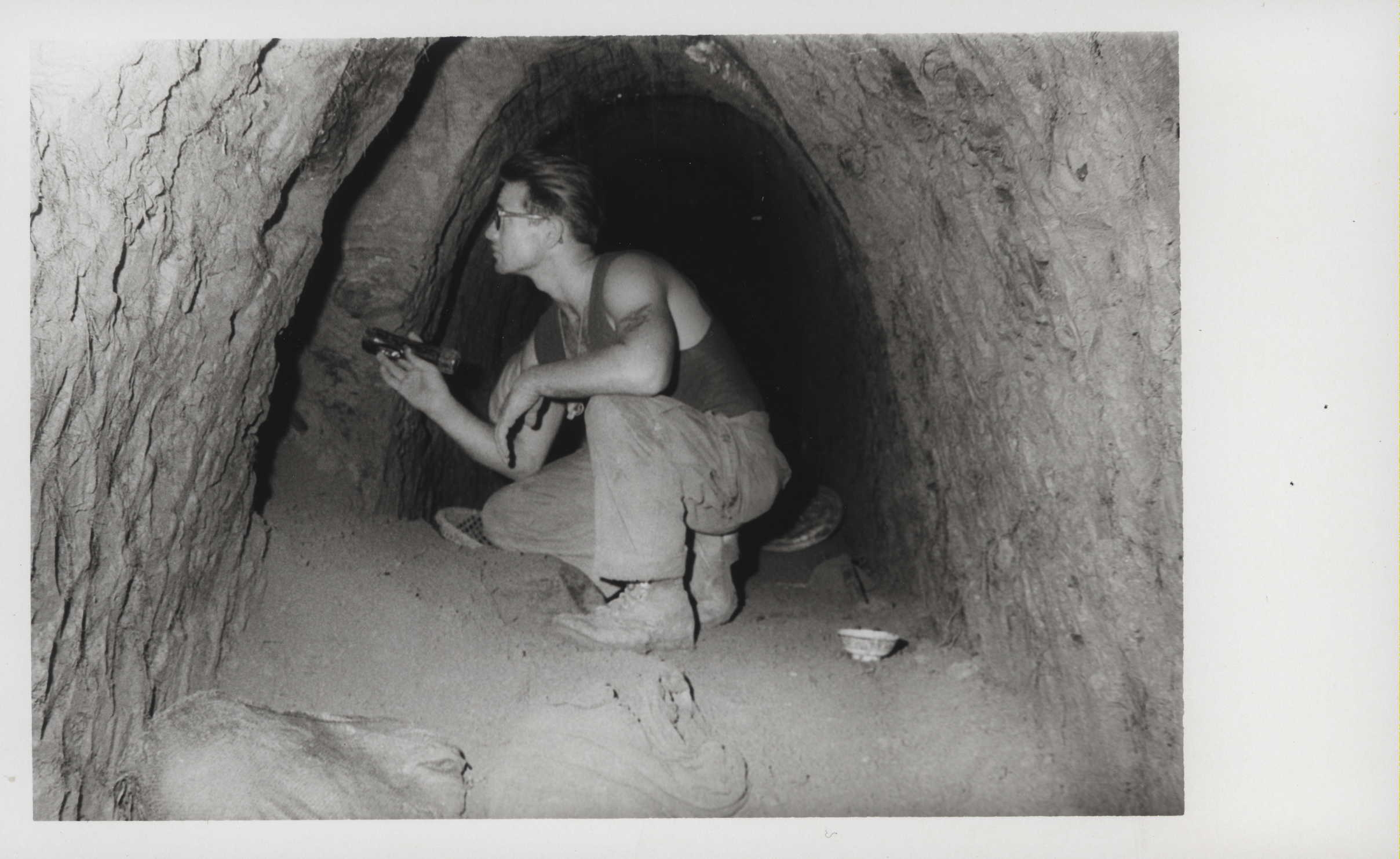
A Marine explores a Viet Cong tunnel complex found by 2/26 Marines

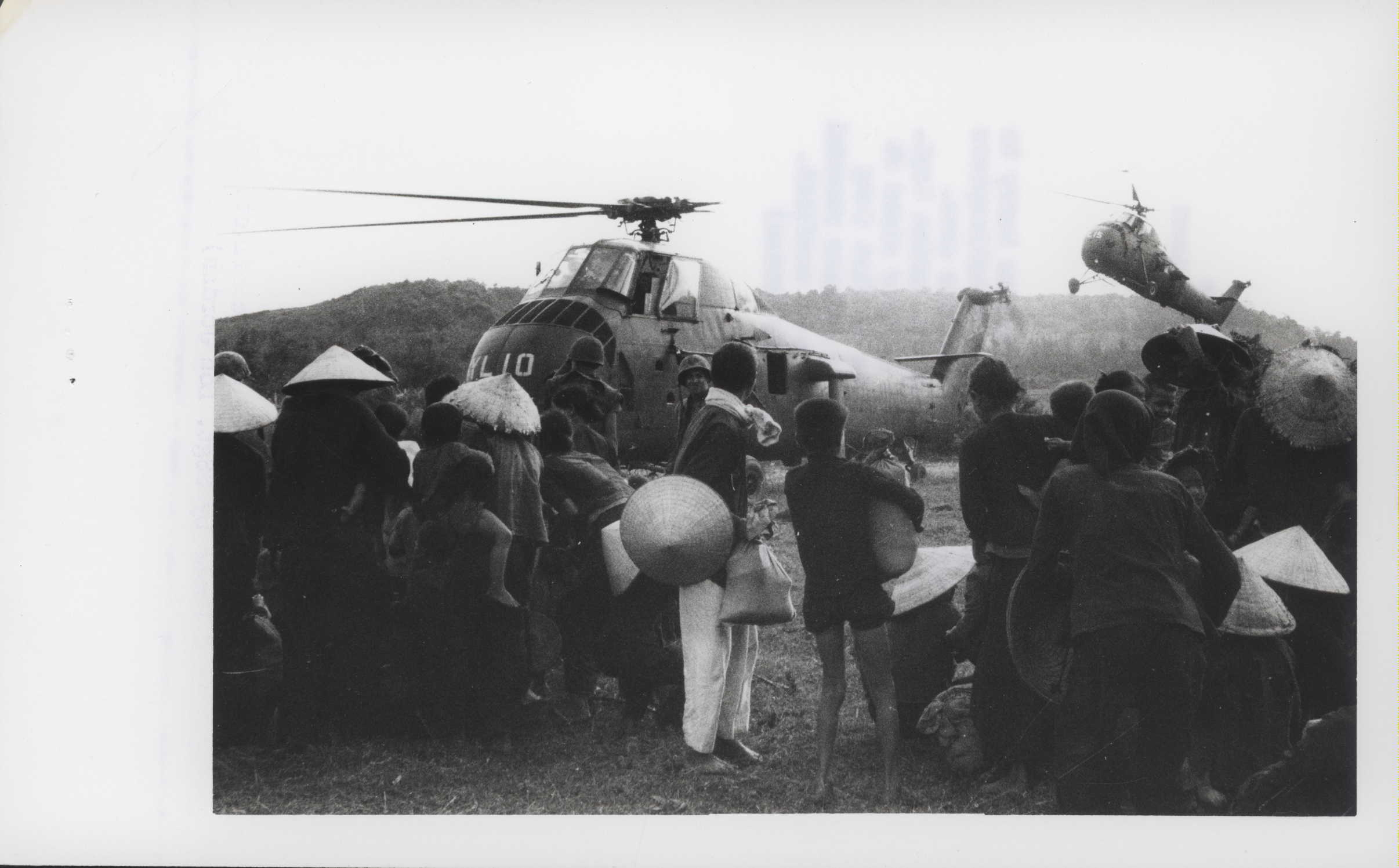
Vietnamese civilians evacuated aboard Marine UH-34 helicopters

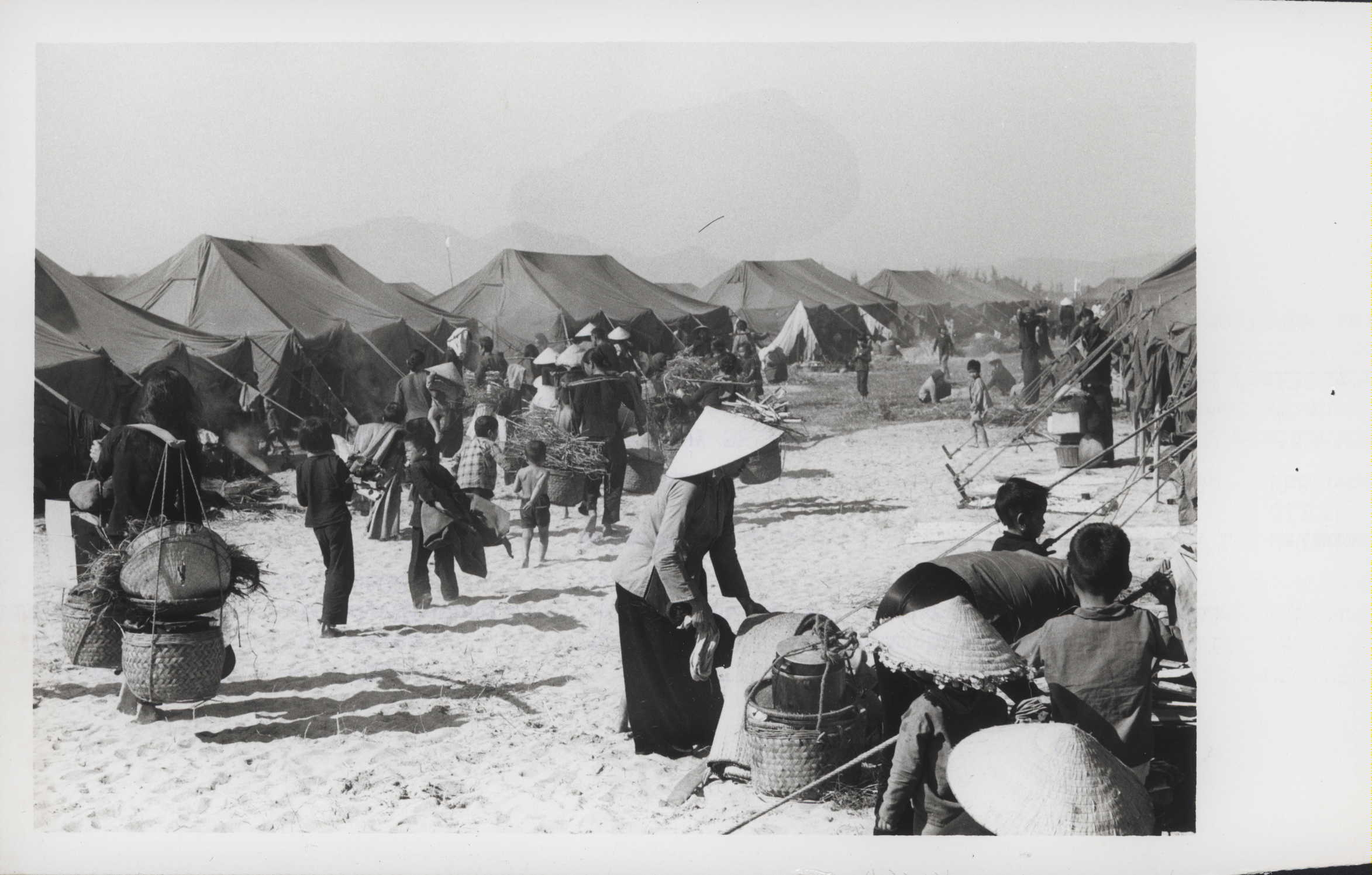
Vietnamese civilians evacuated from the Batangan peninsula sheltered at a relocation facility near Quang Ngai City
