= George Edward Wahlen =

CMH WWII

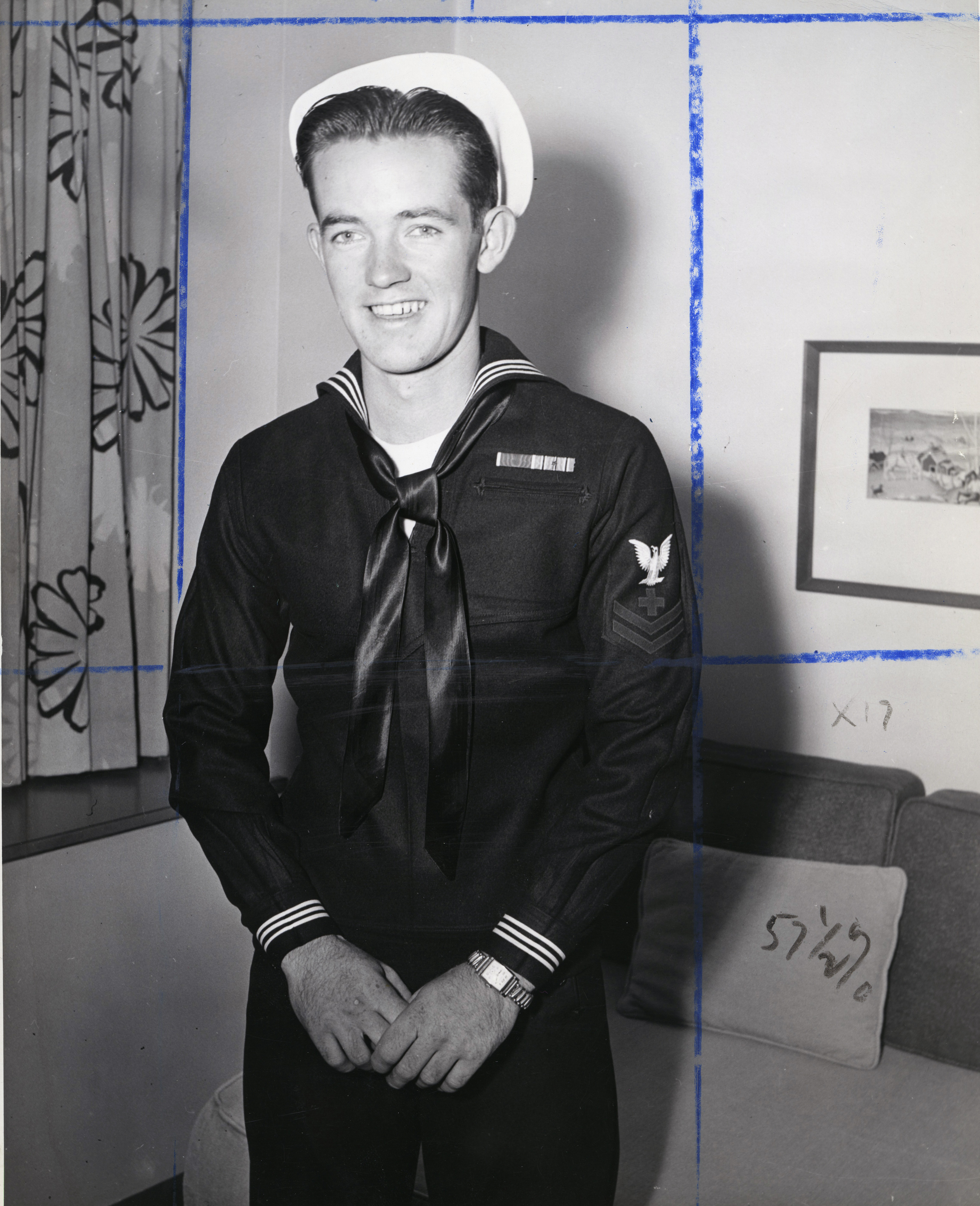
- George E. Wahlen, Pharmacist's Mate 2nd Class, U.S. Naval Reserve
- Born: August 8, 1924; Ogden, Utah
- Died: June 5, 2009 (aged 84); Salt Lake County, Utah
- Burial place: Memorial Gardens of the Wasatch, South Ogden, Utah
- Military career
- Allegiance: United States of America
- Branch: United States Navy; United States Army
- Service years: 1943–1945 (Navy Reserve); 1948–1968 (Army)
- Rank: Pharmacist's Mate Second Class (Navy); Major (Army)
- Units: 2nd Battalion, 26th Marines
- Conflicts: World War II; Battle of Iwo Jima (WIA); Korean War; Vietnam War
- Awards: Medal of Honor; Navy Cross(2); Purple Heart(4); Bronze Star; Army Commendation Medal

George E. Wahlen (August 8, 1924 – June 5, 2009) was a United States Army major who served with the United States Navy as a hospital corpsman attached to a Marine Corps rifle company in World War II and was awarded the U.S. military's highest decoration for valor, the Medal of Honor, for heroism above and beyond the call of duty during the Battle of Iwo Jima. He was an Army officer in the Korean War and was wounded in the Vietnam War.

== Biography ==
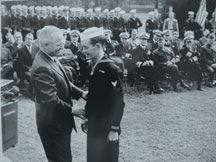
Wahlen receiving the Medal of Honor from President Harry S. Truman

Whalen was born in Ogden, Utah, on August 8, 1924.

Wahlen, at age 17 in 1943, trained as an aircraft mechanic and served at Hill Field in Utah, leading five other mechanics as crew chief for the United States Army Air Corps. He volunteered for the military draft, hoping to work on aircraft.

He enlisted in the U.S. Naval Reserve (U.S. Navy Reserve) in Salt Lake City, on June 11, 1943, as a seaman apprentice. One week later, he went on active duty and completed recruit training at the Naval Training Station in San Diego, California. On July 20, he was advanced to seaman apprentice second class and attended the Naval Hospital Corpsman School in San Diego. After graduating, he was transferred to the Naval Hospital there and advanced to seaman apprentice first class on November 1, 1943. On December 1, he was advanced to pharmacist mate third class and assigned that month to the Field Medical Service School at Camp Elliot, California, for fielding training. After completion of his training there in February 1944, he was assigned to the 2nd Battalion, 26th Marines, 5th Marine Division at Camp Pendleton, California.

In July 1944, the division left for Hawaii for further training. On November 1, he was advanced to pharmacist mate second class and was assigned to Fox Company, 2/26 Marines of the division. He landed with his unit on Iwo Jima on February 19, 1945, and was seriously wounded by an enemy grenade on February 26 in combat. Refusing evacuation, he continued going on to help wounded Marines on the battlefield, and on March 2, he was wounded in the back and refused to be evacuated again, and continued on aiding more Marines until he was shot in the leg on March 3 for a third time and unable to walk. However, he crawled his way for 50 yards to attend to one more wounded Marine before he was finally evacuated. He was evacuated to Guam, Hawaii, and California.

Wahlen, two other sailors (including Navy corpsman Robert E. Bush for the Battle of Okinawa), and eleven Marines each were presented the Medal of Honor from President Harry S. Truman outside the White House on October 5, 1945.

Wahlen spent nine months recovering from his wounds before being honorably discharged on December 19, 1945. In 1948, he re-enlisted in the United States Army as a medical technician, became an officer, and served in the Korean War and the Vietnam War. He retired from the army in 1968, with the rank of major after being wounded and awarded a Purple Heart.

As a civilian he worked for over a decade with the Veteran's Administration, where he retired at the age of 59. He is the subject of the book The Quiet Hero: The Untold Medal of Honor Story of George E. Wahlen at the Battle for Iwo Jima by Gary W. Toyn.

Wahlen died at age 84, and was buried on June 12, 2009. A large memorial service was held on June 18, 2009, attended by veterans of all ranges. The main entrance to the George E. Wahlen Medical Center was draped in black banners in his memory. Before his death, he was Utah's last living Medal of Honor recipient.

== Medal of Honor citation ==
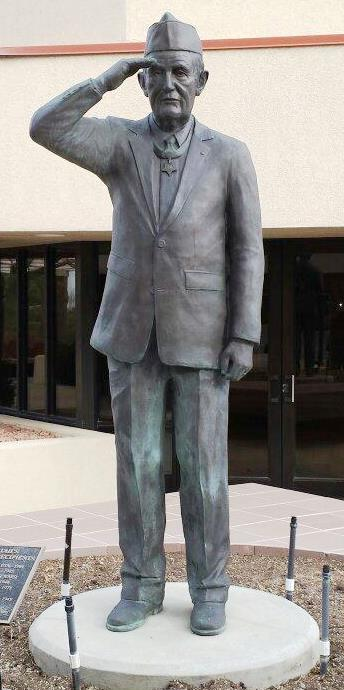
Major Wahlen statue at the Utah Valley Memorial Veterans Cemetery

Wahlen's citation reads:

The President of the United States in the name of The Congress takes pleasure in presenting the MEDAL OF HONOR to

HOSPITAL CORPSMAN SECOND CLASS GEORGE E. WAHLEN
UNITED STATES NAVY RESERVE

for service as set forth in the following

CITATION:

For conspicuous gallantry and intrepidity at the risk of his life above and beyond the call of duty while serving with the 2d Battalion, 26th Marines, 5th Marine Division, during action against enemy Japanese forces on Iwo Jima in the Volcano group on 3 March 1945. Painfully wounded in the bitter action on 26 February, Wahlen remained on the battlefield, advancing well forward of the frontlines to aid a wounded marine and carrying him back to safety despite a terrific concentration of fire. Tireless in his ministrations, he consistently disregarded all danger to attend his fighting comrades as they fell under the devastating rain of shrapnel and bullets, and rendered prompt assistance to various elements of his combat group as required. When an adjacent platoon suffered heavy casualties, he defied the continuous pounding of heavy mortars and deadly fire of enemy rifles to care for the wounded, working rapidly in an area swept by constant fire and treating 14 casualties before returning to his own platoon. Wounded again on 2 March, he gallantly refused evacuation, moving out with his company the following day in a furious assault across 600 yards of open terrain and repeatedly rendering medical aid while exposed to the blasting fury of powerful Japanese guns. Stouthearted and indomitable, he persevered in his determined efforts as his unit waged fierce battle and, unable to walk after sustaining a third agonizing wound, resolutely crawled 50 yards to administer first aid to still another fallen fighter. By his dauntless fortitude and valor, Wahlen served as a constant inspiration and contributed vitally to the high morale of his company during critical phases of this strategically important engagement. His heroic spirit of self-sacrifice in the face of overwhelming enemy fire upheld the highest traditions of the U.S. Naval Service.

Harry S. Truman

== Honors and legacy ==
In 2004, President George W. Bush signed legislation authorizing the naming of the George E. Wahlen Department of Veterans Affairs Medical Center in Salt Lake City. Since federal buildings cannot bear the name of a living person, Congress approved special legislation allowing for an exemption in the case of Wahlen.

A veterans' nursing home in Ogden, Utah, which opened in January 2010, was named in his honor.

A city park in Roy, Utah, is named after George E. Wahlen. It was re-dedicated in November 2018 (marker originally placed in 1990).

== See also ==
- List of Medal of Honor recipients for the Battle of Iwo Jima
