= Con Thien =

Military base in the Vietnam War

Battle of Con Thien
- Part of the Vietnam War
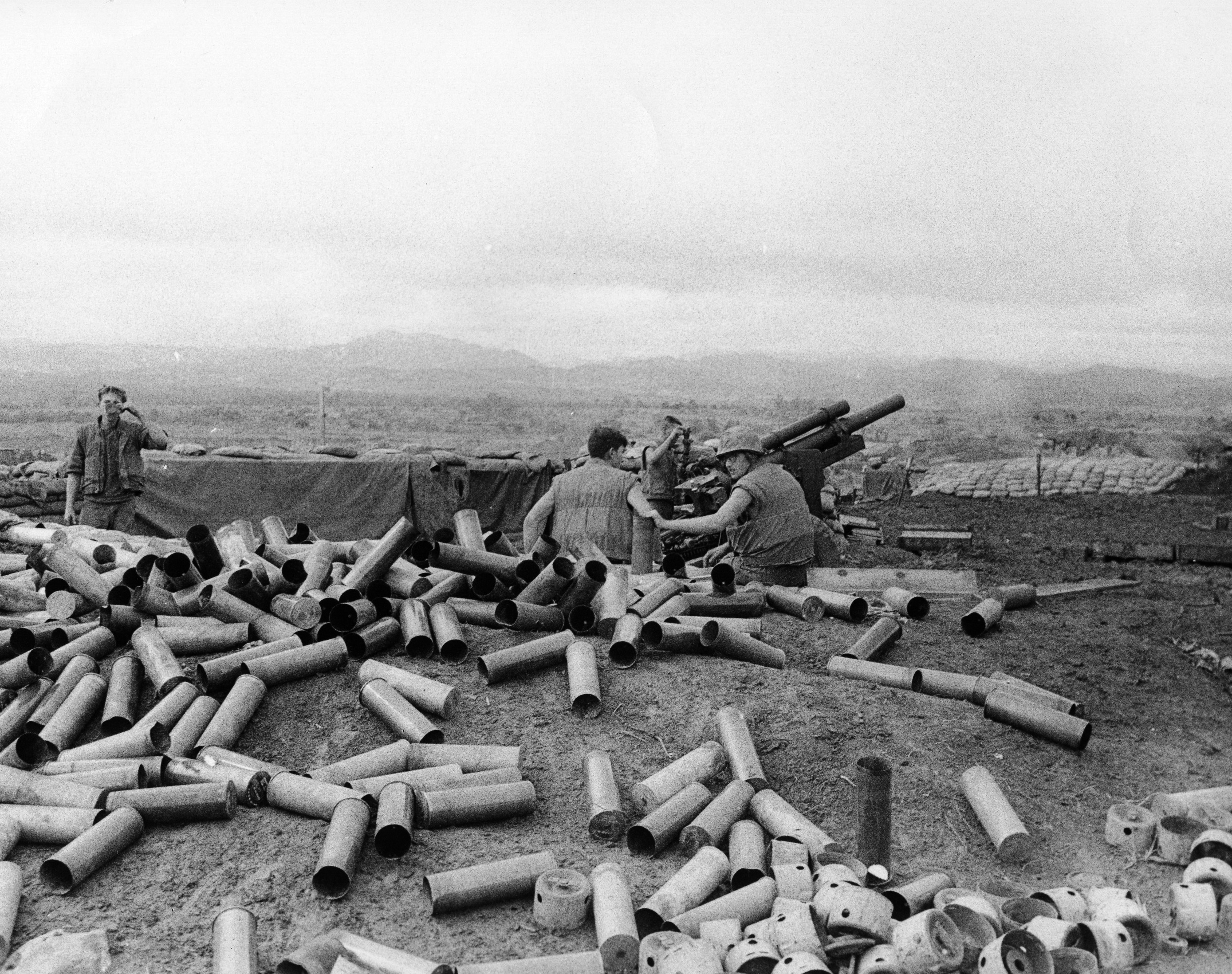
- Company E, 2/12 Marines 105mm firing in support of 1/1 Marines near Con Thien, 25 November 1967
Date	27 February 1967 – 28 February 1969
Location	Vietnamese Demilitarized Zone
Result	U.S. claim victory

Belligerents
United States; South Vietnam	North Vietnam

Commanders and leaders
LtCol R.J. Schening; Lt. Gen. Victor H. Krulak	

Strength
3rd Marine Division: 9,000 Marines; (South Vietnam) Unknown	U.S. estimate: 8,000–12,000

Casualties and losses
(United States) 1,419 killed 9,265 wounded (South Vietnam) Unknown	U.S. body count: 7,563 killed 168 captured

Con Thien (Vietnamese: Cồn Tiên, meaning the "Hill of Angels") was a military base that started out as a U.S. Army Special Forces camp before transitioning to a United States Marine Corps combat base. It was located near the Vietnamese Demilitarized Zone (DMZ) about 3 kilometers (1.9 mi) from North Vietnam in Gio Linh District, Quảng Trị Province. It was the site of fierce fighting from February 1967 through February 1968.

== Location ==
Con Thien is located at 16°54′35″N 106°58′48″E (MGRS 48QYD113703) and was originally established as a Special Forces/CIDG camp on 20 February 1967 at Hill 158 by Special forces Det. A-110. The camp was built by a detachment from Naval Mobile Construction Battalion 4. and turned over to the 1st Battalion, 9th Marines, on 27 July 1967. Together with Marine bases at Gio Linh, Đông Hà and Cam Lộ, Con Thien enclosed the area known to the Marines as Leatherneck Square. Con Thien was intended to be used as a base for the McNamara Line to prevent People's Army of Vietnam (PAVN) infiltration across the DMZ. The firebase was strategically important because it offered unfettered views for 15 km east to the coast and north into North Vietnam. It was also very vulnerable because it was within range of PAVN artillery north of the DMZ which was largely immune to counter-battery fire.

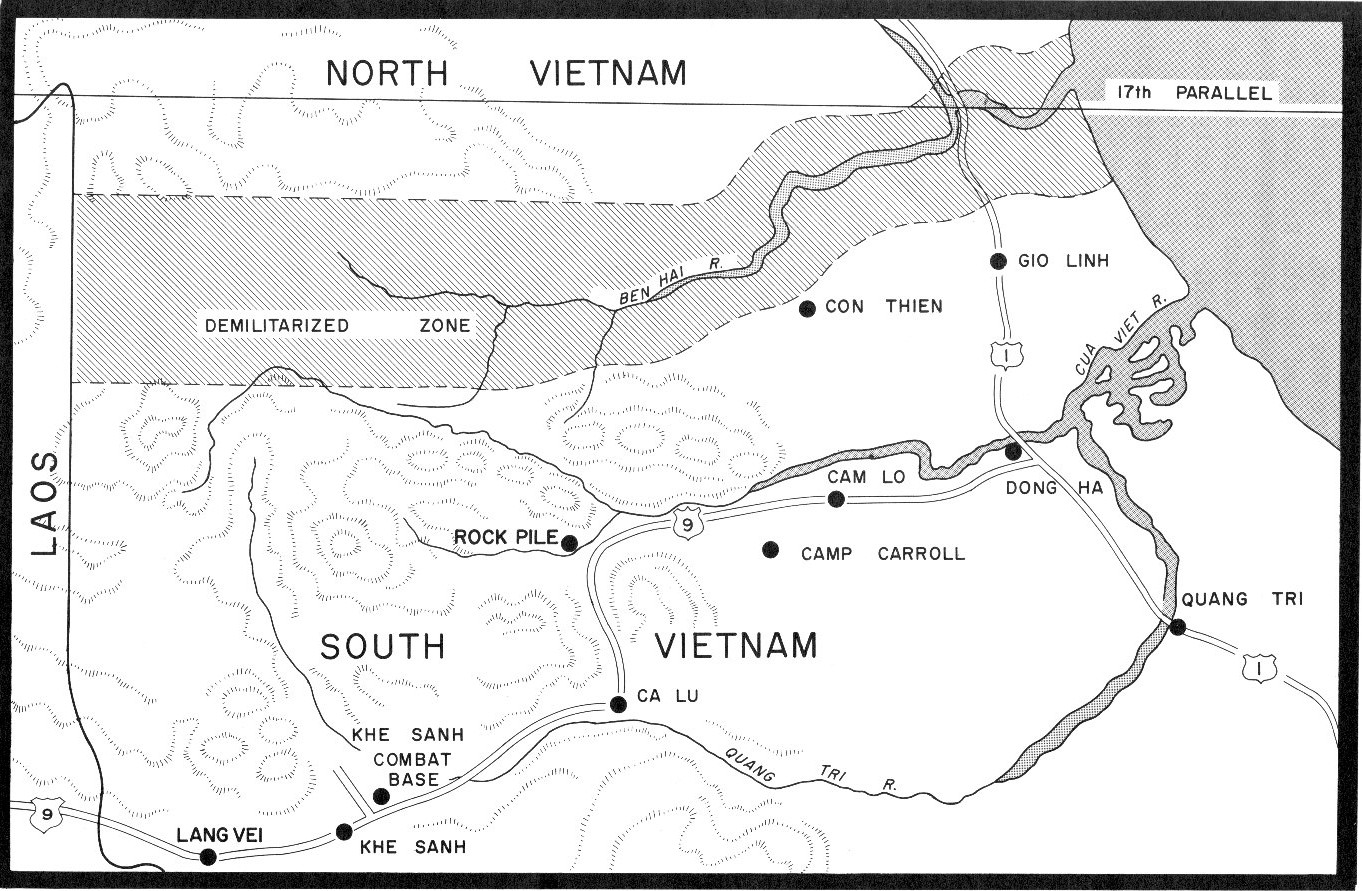
Map of northern Quang Tri Province showing location of Con Thien

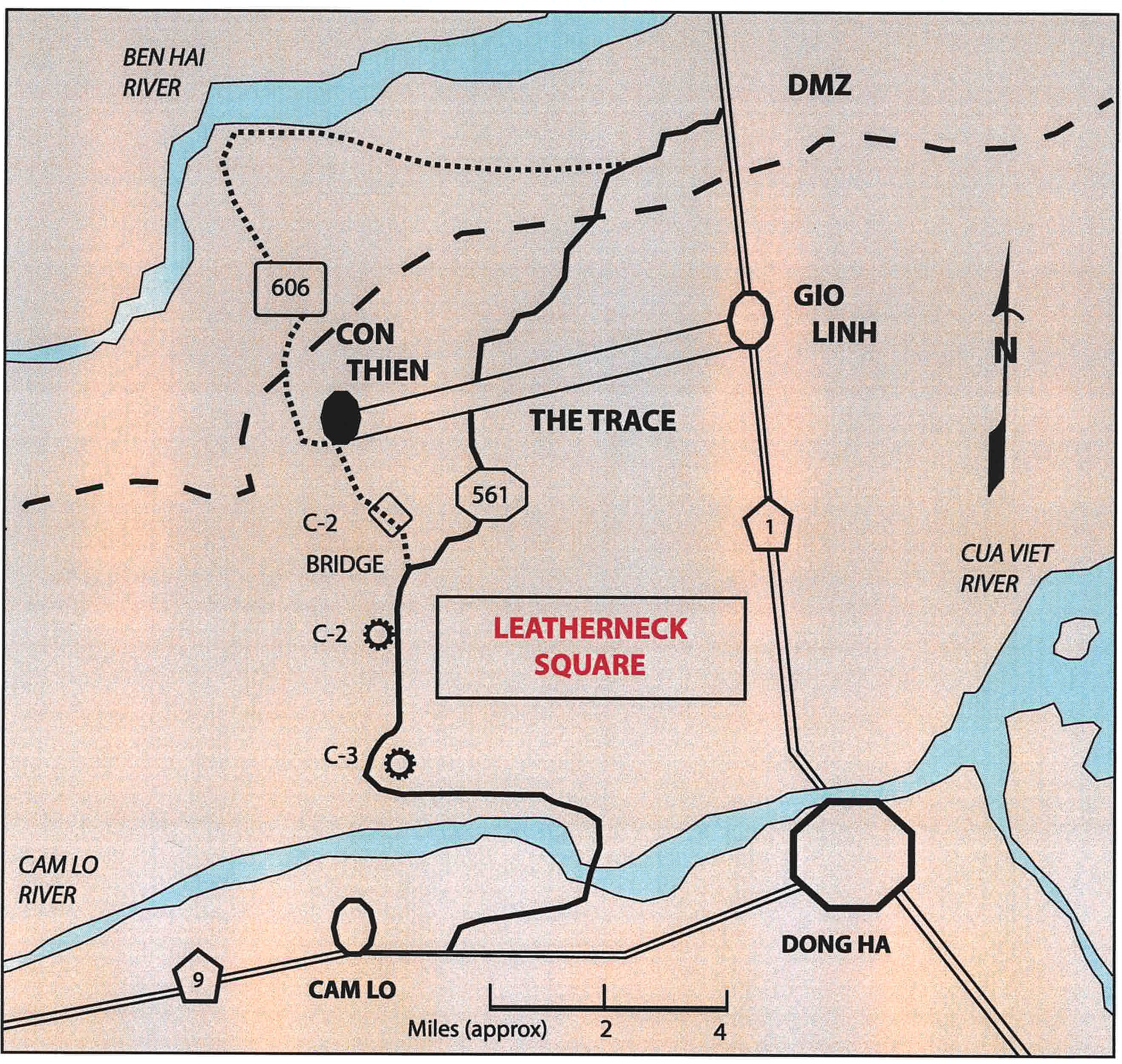
Leatherneck Square

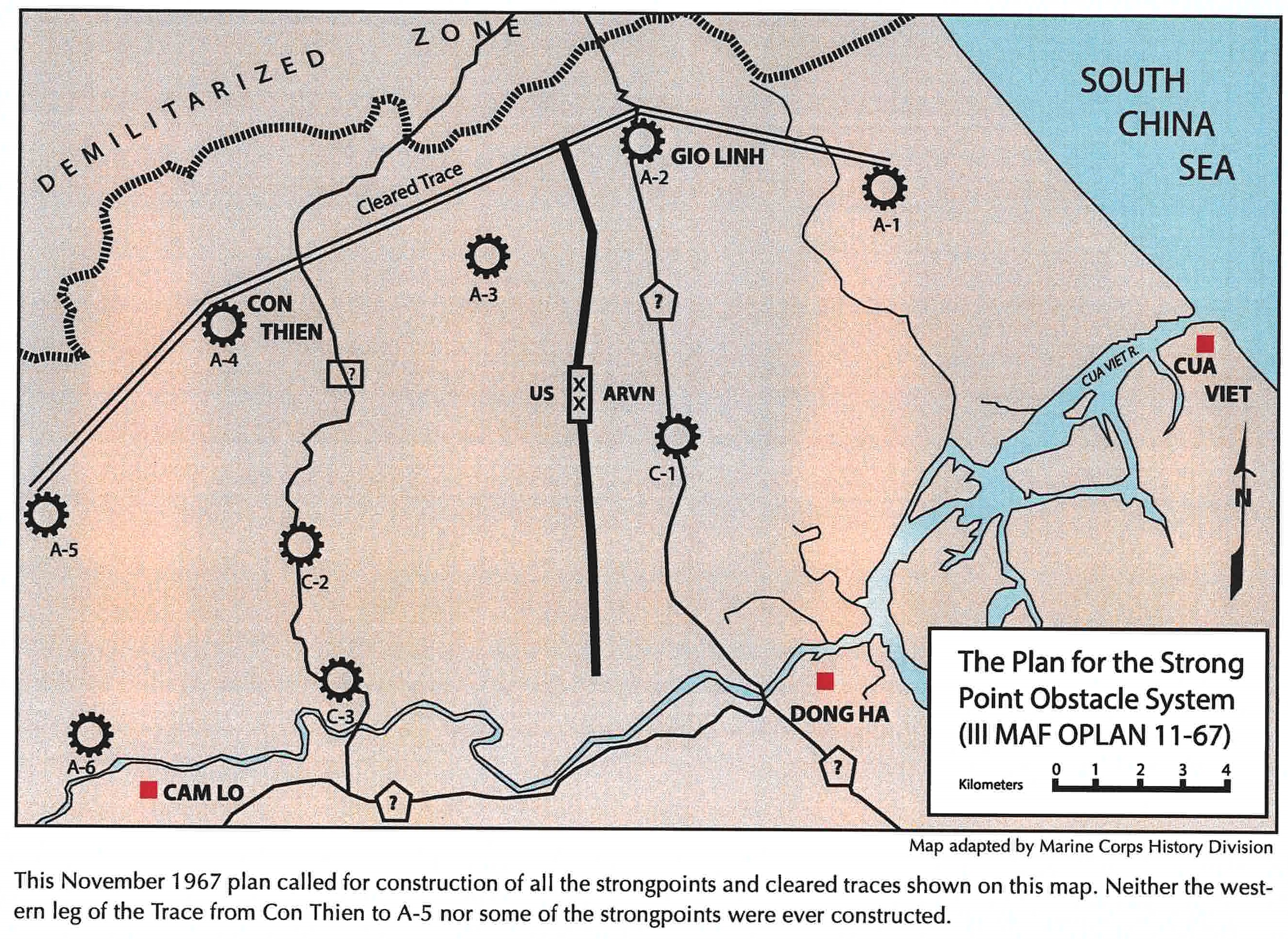
Map of the strongpoint obstacle system or McNamara Line

== Early Border Operations ==
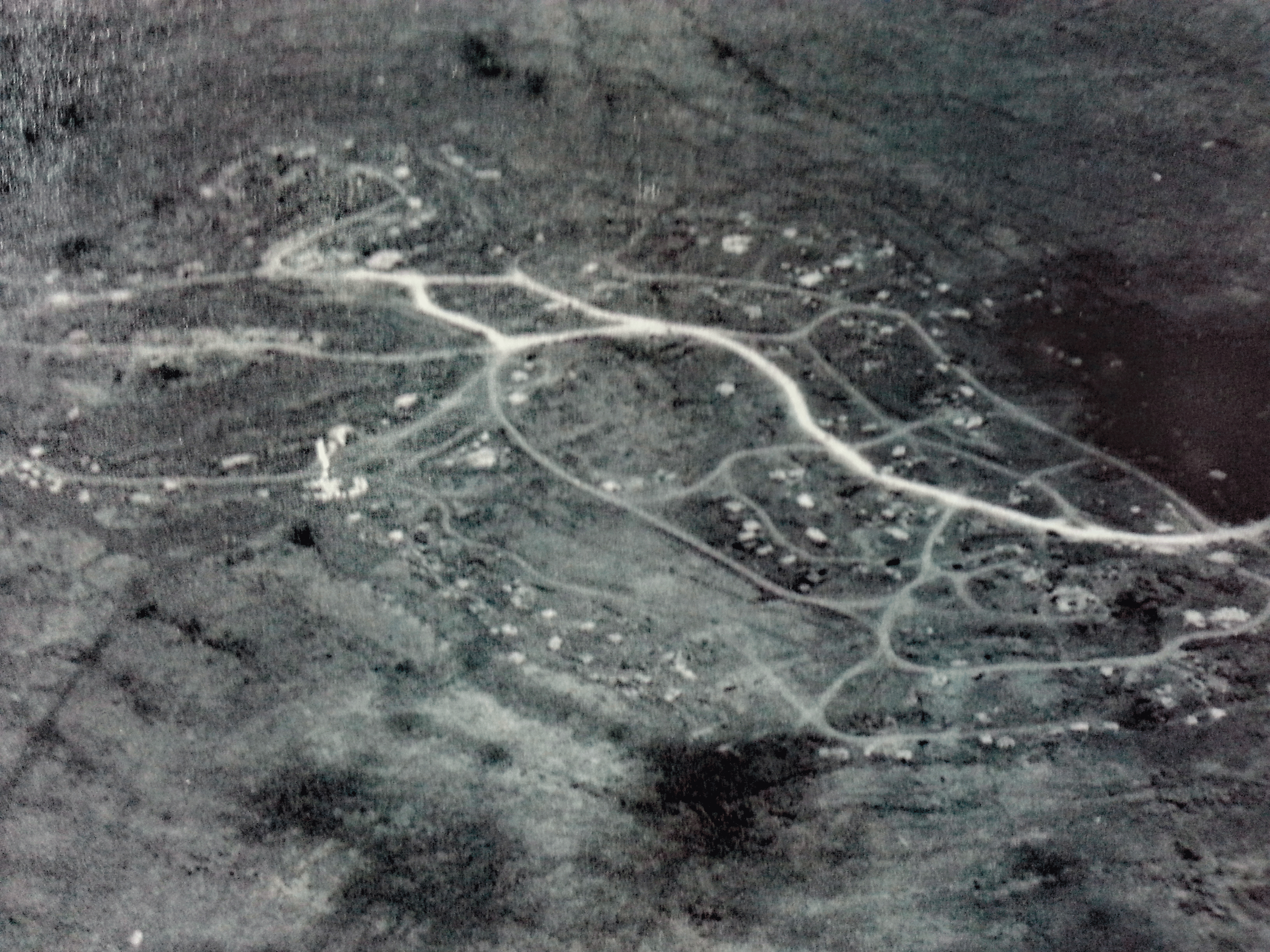
Aerial photograph of the base at Con Thien

On 27 February 1967, in response to Marine artillery fire into and the area north of the DMZ (Operation Highrise) PAVN mortar, rocket and artillery fire hit Con Thien and Gio Linh. On 20 March, the PAVN began shelling Con Thien and Gio Linh, which continued sporadically for the next two weeks.

On 24 March 1st Battalion, 9th Marines began Operation Prairie III where they encountered a PAVN battalion in a bunker complex southeast of Con Thien. After a two-hour fight the PAVN withdrew leaving 33 killed in action. Sergeant Walter K. Singleton was posthumously awarded the Medal of Honor for his actions in the attack. 3rd Battalion, 3rd Marines operating beside 1/9th Marines encountered an entrenched PAVN Company, killing 28 PAVN including two women. On 30 March, Company I, 3rd Battalion, 9th Marines was establishing a night ambush position when it was attacked by a PAVN force, 2LT John P. Bobo was posthumously awarded the Medal of Honor for his actions during the attack.

In mid-April Charlie Company, 11th Engineer Battalion was tasked with clearing a 200m wide strip from Con Thien to Gio Linh, a distance of 10.6 km. The engineers were protected by a task force consisting of the 1st Battalion, 4th Marines, an AMTRAC (LVT-5) platoon, a platoon of M42 Dusters from the 1st Battalion, 44th Artillery Regiment and some Army of the Republic of Vietnam (ARVN) units. By 19 April, despite harassment from PAVN mines, small arms, recoilless rifle, mortar and artillery fire the strip was half-completed.

In order to protect Route 561, the supply line to Con Thien from Route 9, the Marines had established two outposts: Charlie 2 was located 3 km southeast of Con Thien and contained artillery and infantry positions, while Charlie 2A (nicknamed the Washout) was on low-lying ground overlooking a bridge.

== Attack on Con Thien ==
At 03:00 on 8 May some 300 rounds of mortar and artillery fire hit the base, while PAVN sappers with Bangalore torpedoes breached the perimeter wire. At 04:00 two battalions of the PAVN 812th Regiment armed with flamethrowers overran the Special Forces base. At the time of the attack the base was defended by Special Forces Detachment A-110, ARVN Special Forces, CIDG and Seabees. A small command element with A and D Companies, 1/4th Marines and several tanks from the 3rd Tank Battalion were providing security for engineers that were clearing a 200 meter wide fire zone around Leatherneck Square. The well-organized attack fell primarily on Company D's northern perimeter with fierce hand-to-hand combat. The outnumbered defenders eventually repelled the attacking forces. A relief column from Company A, 1/4th Marines was sent with an M42 Duster, 2 LVT-5s and 2 quarter ton trucks. The M42 was hit by an RPG-7 and an LVT-5 and one truck were destroyed by flamethrowers and satchel charges. By 09:00 the PAVN had withdrawn leaving 197 killed and 8 prisoners. The Marines had suffered 44 killed and 110 wounded, the CIDG had 14 killed with 2 missing in action, the Special Forces had 4 wounded and the Seabees had 5. Base commander Captain Chamberlain received the Distinguished Service Cross and Purple Heart for his valor and leadership in repulsing the attack.

== Remilitarizing the DMZ ==
After the 8 May attack, recognizing that the PAVN were using the DMZ as a sanctuary for attacks into I Corps, Washington lifted the prohibition on US forces entering the DMZ and MACV authorized the III Marine Amphibious Force (III MAF) to conduct combat operations into the southern half of the DMZ.

From 13–16 May, 1/9 Marines cleared Route 561 from Cam Lo to Con Thien fought a well-entrenched PAVN force south of the base. The PAVN subsequently withdrew into the DMZ.

=== Operations Hickory/Lam Son 54/Beau Charger ===
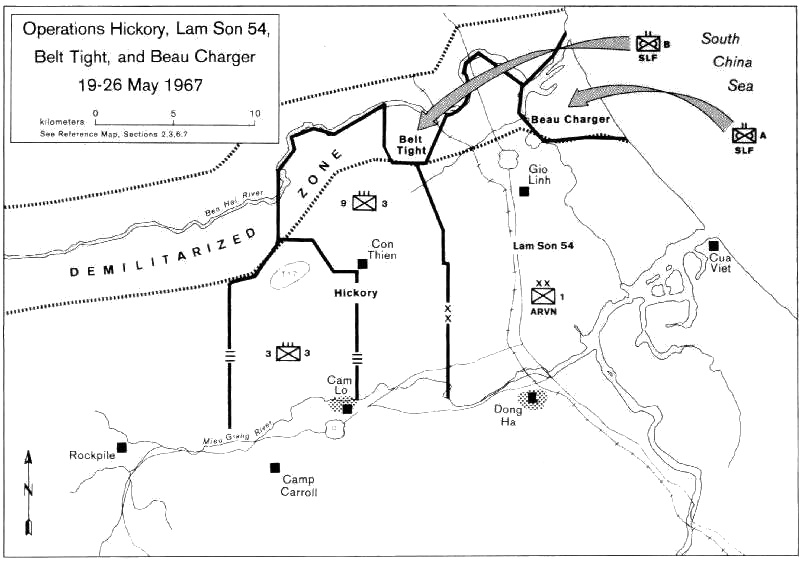
Map of Operations Hickory, Belt Tight, Beau Charger and Lam Son 54

III MAF proceeded to plan a series of combined operations with ARVN forces that occurred from 18 to 26 May. Under Operation Hickory 3rd Marine Regiment advanced to the Bến Hải River. Under Operation Lam Son 54 the ARVN 1st Division advanced parallel to the 3rd Marines along Highway 1 while the amphibious Special Landing Force Alpha secured the coastline south of the Bến Hải River under Operation Beau Charger and Special Landing Force Bravo linked up with 3rd Marines under Operation Belt Tight. Once at the Bến Hải River, the forces swept south on a broad front to Route 9.

From 19 to 27 May, when Lam Son 54 ended, the ARVN were in constant contact with the PAVN. The ARVN suffered 22 killed and 122 wounded, while claiming the PAVN suffered 342 killed and 30 captured.

The amphibious element of Operation Beau Charger met no opposition while the heliborne assault dropped into a hot LZ. Only one platoon was landed and it remained isolated until rescued several hours later. Beau Charger continued until 26 May with minimal contact. 85 PAVN were claimed to have been killed.

In Operation Hickory, the 2nd Battalion, 26th Marines and 2nd Battalion, 9th Marines advanced north from Con Thien on the morning of 18 May to press any PAVN against a blocking force from the 3rd Battalion, 4th Marines 3/4th Marines landed by helicopters on the Bến Hải River. At 10:00, 2/26th Marines made contact with 2 PAVN Battalions in bunkers and trenches. The 2/9the Marines joined 2/26th and fought a running battle until nightfall. Five Marines were killed and 142 were wounded, while 31 PAVN were killed. That night 75 radar-controlled airstrikes were called in on the bunker complex. At 07:00 on 19 May after 2 hours of artillery preparation (in which short rounds killed 3 Marines), the 2/26th Marines proceeded to attack the bunker complex, overrunning it by 10:30 and claiming to have killed 34 PAVN. At 13:30 2/9th Marines met heavy automatic weapons and mortar fire and an M48 tank moved up to silence the PAVN positions with canister fire. 2 M48s were later knocked out by RPG-2 fire and 2/9th Marines suffered 7 killed and 12 wounded.

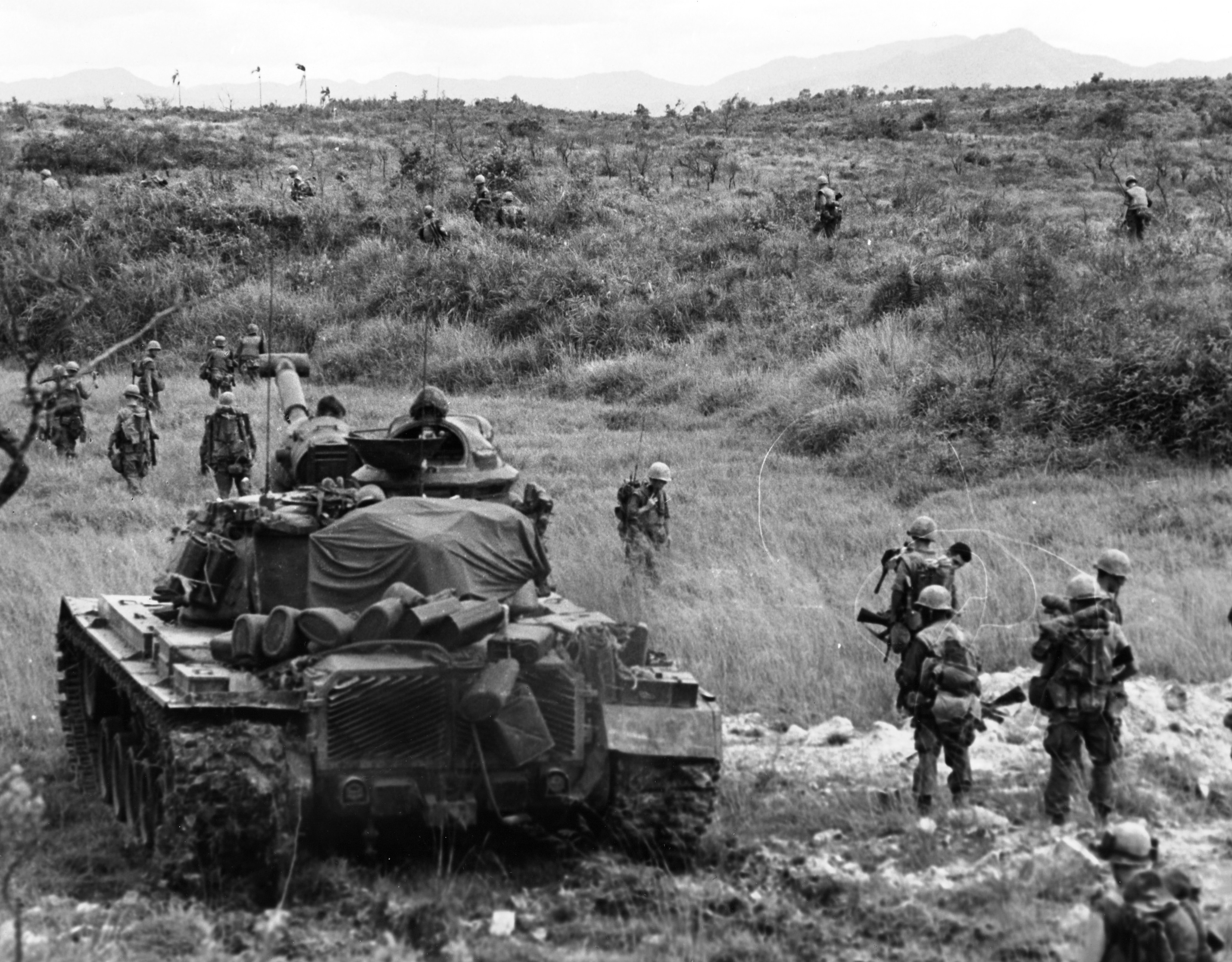
Company B 1/4 Marines and 3rd Tank Battalion M48s in Operation Hickory II

On 20 May, 3rd Battalion, 9th Marines covering the left flank of the operation encountered a PAVN bunker complex and in fighting lasting into 21 May suffered 26 killed and 59 wounded for 36 PAVN dead. The reserve Special Landing Force Bravo 2nd Battalion, 3rd Marines joined the operation on 20 May landing by helicopter northwest of Firebase Gio Linh. They swept the area north to the DMZ meeting minimal resistance but discovering PAVN bunkers and supplies.

On 25 May, Company H, 2/26th Marines engaged a large PAVN Company at the base of Hill 117, 5 km west of Con Thien. Company H joined by Company K, 3/4th Marines made repeated advances up the hill against the PAVN with heavy fighting lasting throughout the day and costing 14 Marines and corpsmen killed and 92 wounded, while claiming 41 PAVN were killed. Marine air and artillery pounded the top of the hill throughout the night, and a new assault was planned for the morning of 26 May, but PAVN fire brought down a UH-1E, injuring the command element, and the assault was postponed until 27 May when Companies E and F, 2/26th Marines and 3/4th Marines secured the hilltop with no resistance.

For the remainder of Operation Hickory the Marines encountered only scattered resistance but discovered and destroyed numerous bunkers, ordnance and rice. Operation Hickory concluded on 28 May; the Marines had suffered 142 KIA and 896 wounded with US claims of 362 PAVN killed. Lam Son 54, Hickory, Belt Tight and Beau Charger also resulted in the removal of the entire civilian population from the area with the result that it was all now a free fire zone.

=== Operation Prairie IV ===
At the conclusion of Operation Hickory, all participating units joined Operation Prairie IV sweeping the area southwest of Con Thien. On 28 May 3/4 Marines ran into a bunker complex on Hill 174, 6 km southwest of Con Thien. Companies M and L attacked the complex but were forced back by small arms, machine guns, 57mm recoilless rifle and 82mm mortars for the loss of 2 Marines killed and 21 wounded. Artillery hit the hill throughout the night and the next day Companies M and I attacked the hill, suffering 5 KIA and 33 wounded without driving the PAVN from the crest of the hill. Companies M and I attacked unsuccessfully again on 30 May suffering 1 killed and 45 wounded. The PAVN abandoned the hill during the night of 30/31 May. Operation Prairie IV resulted in US claiming 505 PAVN killed and 8 captured for 164 Marines killed and 1240 wounded.

=== Operation Cimarron ===
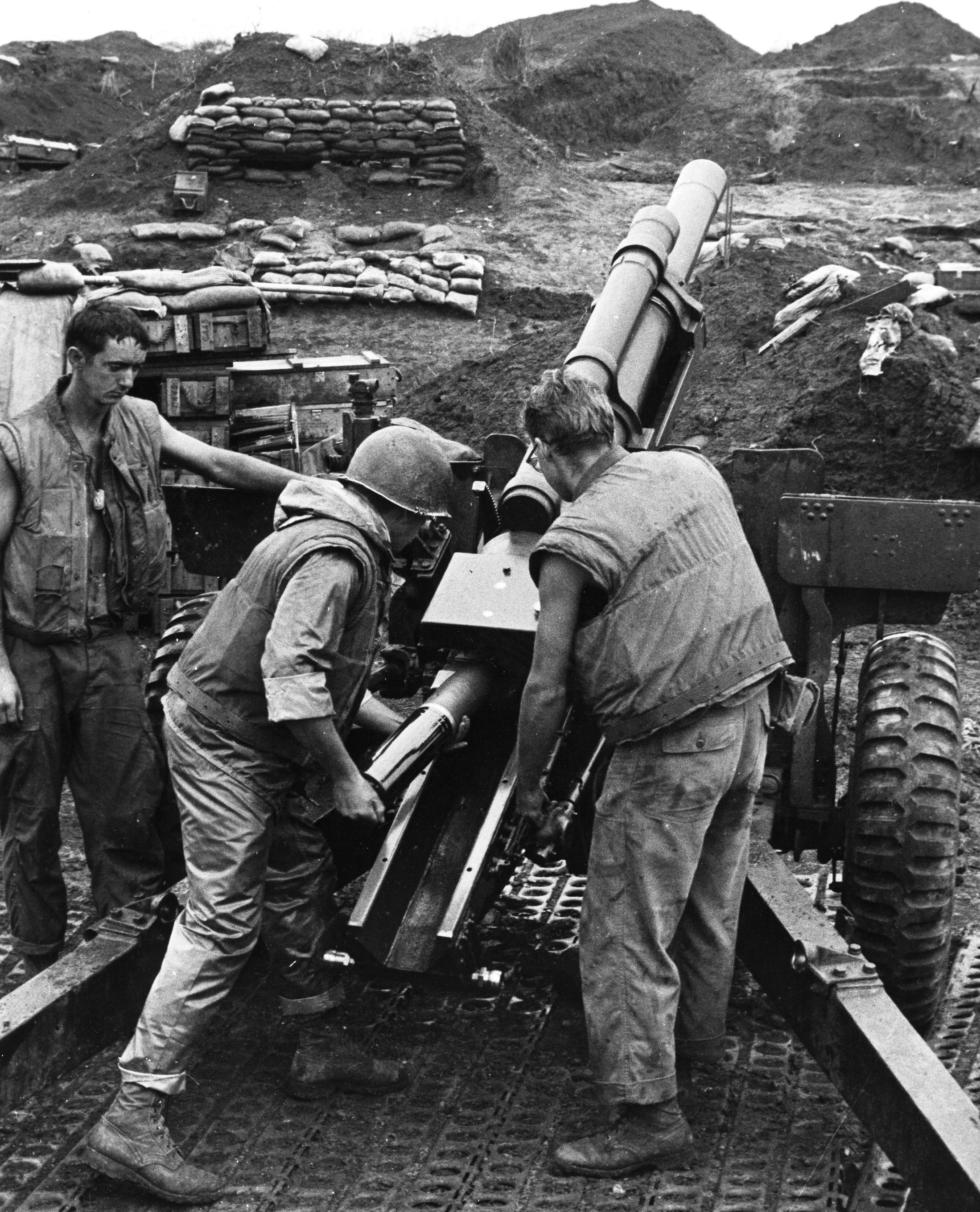
2/12 Marines firing their 105mm howitzer, Con Thien, 19 October 1967

Operation Cimarron began on 1 June in the same area with the same units. There was limited contact with the PAVN but many enemy bunkers and supply caches were found and destroyed and several PAVN graves located. Cimarron ended on 2 July. On 1 July the land-clearing project from Con Thien to Gio Linh was completed, with the clear strip widened to 600m.

=== Operation Buffalo ===
On 2 July Companies A and B from 1/9 launched Operation Buffalo, a sweep of the area north of Con Thien. As the infantrymen moved along Route 561 in an area called the "Marketplace" (16.927°N 107.00°E), the PAVN attacked, inflicting severe casualties on Company B. This was the single worst day for the Marines in Vietnam (86 killed). Operation Buffalo concluded on 14 July at a cost of 159 Marines killed and 345 wounded. The PAVN were claimed by US sources to have suffered 1290 killed.

=== Operation Hickory II ===
Following the conclusion of Operation Buffalo, III MAF ordered a sweep of the southern half of the DMZ. Operation Hickory II lasted from 14–16 July and resulted in 39 PAVN killed for the loss of 4 Marines dead and 90 wounded.

During July the Army transferred Con Thien to the Marines.

=== Operation Kingfisher ===
Operation Kingfisher took place from 16 July to 31 October 1967.

=== Operation Kentucky ===
Operation Kentucky took place from 1 November 1967 to 28 February 1969 and resulted in 520 Marines killed and 2698 wounded, while US reports claim the PAVN lost 3,839 killed, 117 captured and an unknown number wounded.

In support of Operation Kentucky, squadrons of the First Marine Air Wing provided air support from 4 January 1968 to 23 March 1968. Air support missions included resupply of ammunition, rations, and other supplies. Numerous medevac missions were flown to transport wounded Marines to medical facilities at Dong Ha and to the hospital ship Repose.

== Bombardment ==
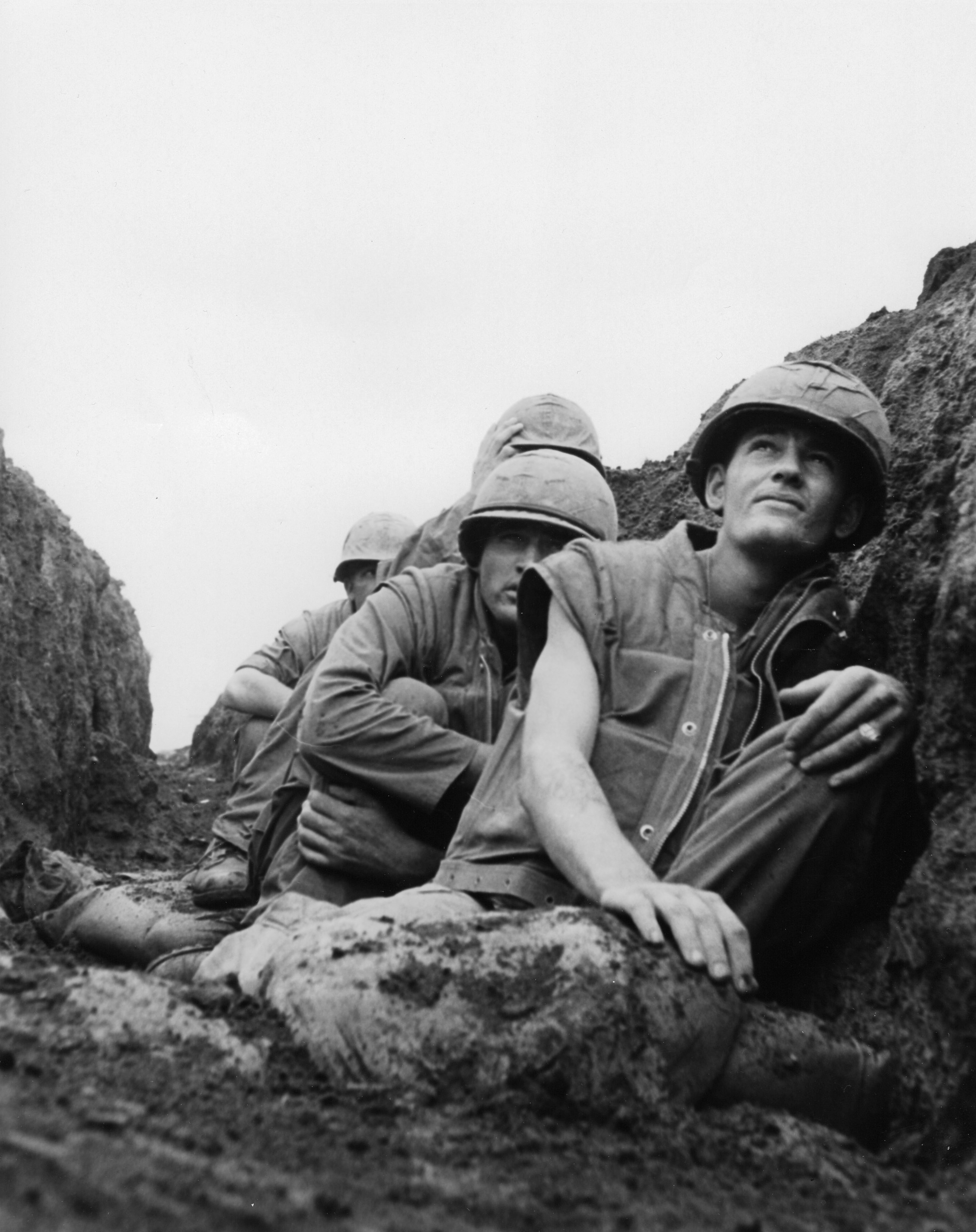
9th Marines take cover at Con Thien

In September 1967 the PAVN started their major shelling of the base hitting it with at least 200 artillery and mortar rounds daily, peaking on 25 September when a reported 1200 rounds hit the base. From 19–27 September more than 3000 rounds hit the base. In response Marine artillery fired 12,577 rounds, Navy ships fired 6148 rounds and more than 5200 Marine and USAF sorties hit PAVN positions.

The Marine Corps rotated battalions in and out of Con Thien every thirty days. The constant shelling and the threat of a PAVN assault took a psychological toll on the Marines, the base was nicknamed "Our Turn in the Barrel" and "the Meat Grinder", while the DMZ was said to stand for "Dead Marine Zone."

== Siege in the media ==
Con Thien was in the news during the time it was under artillery attack. CBS News broadcast the first footage of the bombardment on 11 September 1967. Time magazine featured the story on the cover of its 6 October 1967 issue, which was instrumental in bringing the reality of Vietnam combat to American readers. David Douglas Duncan's photos of the Marines at Con Thien were featured in the 27 October 1967 issue of Life magazine and in his book War Without Heroes. CBS News broadcast a special report on 1 October 1967, The Ordeal of Con Thien, hosted by Mike Wallace, which featured footage and interviews from the field.

== 1968 ==
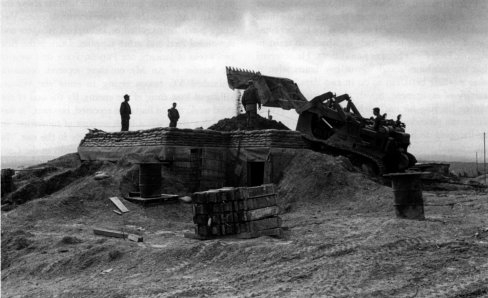
Marines build an ammunition bunker at Con Thien, January 1968

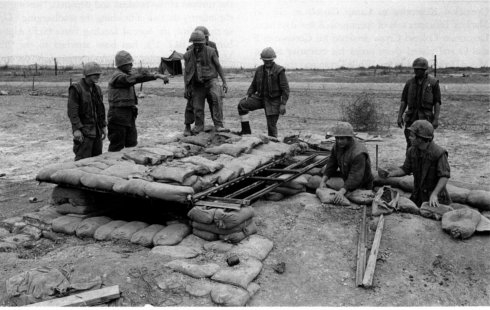
Marines from 1st Battalion, 4th Marines build a fighting bunker, Con Thien, January 1968

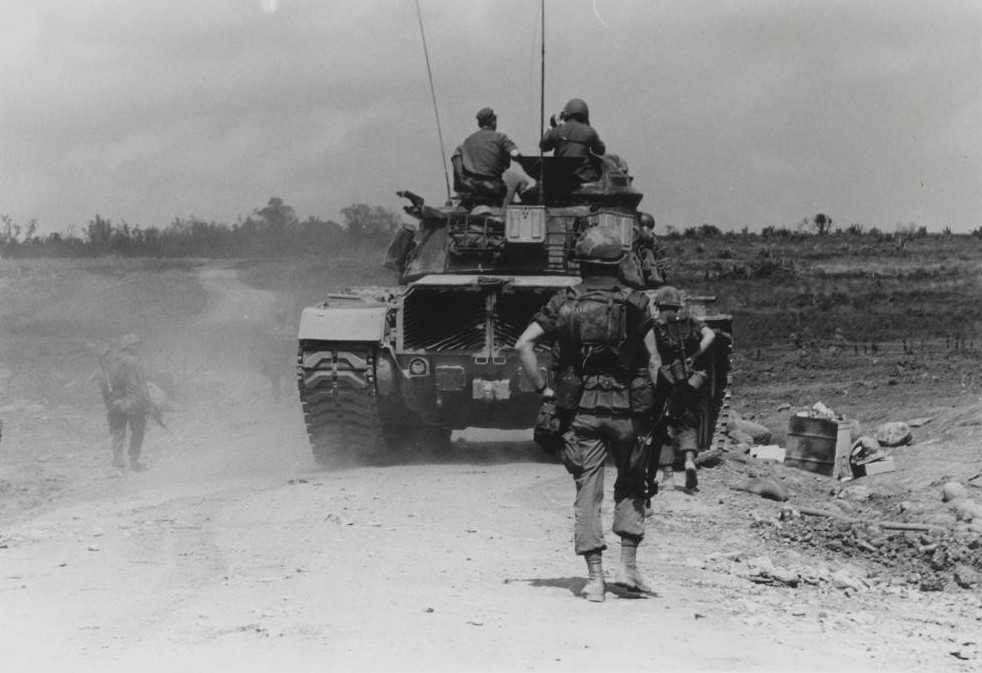
2/4 Marines patrol with a tank south of Con Thien, 9 February 1968

2nd Battalion, 1st Marines took over the defense of Con Thien in mid-December. During the Christmas truce period the Battalion added 11 bunkers and dug a new trench along the forward slope. The troops then sandbagged existing bunkers with a "burster layer" in the roofs, usually consisting of airfield matting to burst delayed fuse rounds. They then covered the positions with rubberized tarps to keep the water out. By the end of the year, all of the new bunkers had been sandbagged and wired in with the new razor wire. During January the PAVN kept up sporadic fire on the base, firing for 22 of 31 days with each barrage averaging about 30 rounds. The artillery fire gradually destroyed the minefield and bunkers protecting the northwest of the base, causing regular casualties.

The PAVN 803rd Regiment had relieved the 90th Regiment in the positions facing Con Thien and began to launch regular small scale probes of the Marine defenses. On the night of 14 January, the PAVN tripped a mine and one soldier was left in the minefield; the PAVN made two attempts to rescue their wounded man, eventually succeeding under cover of small arms, recoilless rifles and mortars. On 22 January, around midday the PAVN bombarded Con Thien with 100 rounds of 82mm mortar, followed by 130 rounds of 152mm shells. 1/4 sustained 2 killed and 16 wounded. Thirty minutes later, about 1 km north of the base, Companies F and G encountered a PAVN Company which withdrew under cover of 60mm mortar fire; two Marines were killed and 8 wounded for 3 PAVN killed.

In late January, with increasing PAVN pressure on Khe Sanh Combat Base and Route 9, 1st Battalion 9th Marines was transferred to Khe Sanh and 3rd Battalion 4th Marines was moved to the Lancaster area of operations. 2nd Battalion 4th Marines was assigned to take over the 3/4's area of operations northeast of Con Thien, and on 27 January, HMM-361 landed the first units near C-2; by the end of the day the entire battalion was deployed.

On 29 January a Marine observer at Con Thien using a Starlight Scope spotted a PAVN convoy moving about 1 km north of the Ben Hai River and called in artillery air strikes. The PAVN responded by launching five SAM-2 missiles on the attacking aircraft, which proceeded to destroy both the convoy and the SAM site.

By the end of January the defensive positions on the trace line, including C-2, C-2A and Con Thien (A-4), were largely complete, although there was abundant evidence of continued PAVN infiltration across the DMZ.

The Tet Offensive was little noticed at Con Thien and elsewhere along the DMZ; rather it was just the same fighting that had been going on for the previous weeks and months. There was no Tet Truce here, but nor was there a sudden PAVN thrust through the DMZ or frontal assault on Khe Sanh as MACV had expected.

The PAVN continued to pressure the Marines particularly around the A-3 strongpoint between Con Thien and Gio Linh. On 3 March, Lima Company, 3rd Battalion 3rd Marines, occupying an outpost on Hill 28 just north of the A-3, intercepted a PAVN battalion attempting to infiltrate the Marine positions. The PAVN encircled the Marines and were only driven back by airstrikes and Huey gunship runs. One Marine was killed and thirteen wounded while killing over 100 PAVN. On 16 March, Mike Company, 3/3 Marines and Charlie Company, 1/4 Marines clashed with another battalion-sized PAVN force. The two Marine companies called in artillery and air upon the PAVN, the bulk of which disengaged, leaving a company behind to fight a rearguard action. PAVN artillery from north of the DMZ answered the American supporting arms with a 400-round barrage of its own on the Marines. Marine casualties were two KIA and nine wounded for 83 PAVN killed. For the entire month in Operation Kentucky, 9th Marines reported over 400 enemy dead while Marine casualties were 37 KIA and more than 200 wounded.

On 22 May a patrol from Company A 1/4 Marines ran into a PAVN force east of Con Thien. 1/4 Marines attacked east from Con Thien, while 3/3 Marines attacked west from Strongpoint A-3. 3/9 Marines were helicoptered into blocking positions in the south, while 1/9 Marines was helicoptered into blocking positions in the north. The PAVN tried to escape across the trace line but were mowed down by artillery, tank, gunship and fixed-wing fire. The PAVN suffered 225 killed, while the Marines had 23 KIA and 75 wounded.

On 6 June, a reinforced platoon from Company E, 26th Marines observed and then engaged a PAVN company while on patrol 1.8 km southeast of Con Thien. Reinforced by the command group and a rifle platoon from Company H, the patrol engaged the PAVN with small arms and 81mm mortars. 14 PAVN were killed and the Marines suffered 14 killed and 11 wounded.

On 7 July, to exploit the results of Operation Thor in the Cua Viet-Dong Ha sector, the 9th Marines began a sweep of the area between Con Thien and the DMZ. On 11 July 4 km northeast of Con Thien, elements of 3/9 Marines discovered a reinforced PAVN platoon in the open. Fixing the PAVN in place with small arms fire, the Marines, with air, artillery, and tank support, launched a coordinated air-ground attack through the area killing more than 30 PAVN. The 9th Marines uncovered and destroyed numerous PAVN fortifications, a few of the positions were lightly defended, but the majority were abandoned. One bunker system discovered 4 km due north of Con Thien spanned more than 1 km and included 242 well-constructed bunkers. Supplies and equipment abandoned included weapons, 935 mortar rounds, 500 pounds of explosives, 55 antitank mines, and 500 pounds of rice. The Marines also found 29 NVA bodies, killed by artillery and airstrikes during the advance on the complex.

On 21 July 2/9 Marines discovered a major PAVN bunker complex 6 km southwest of Con Thien. Composed of 60 A-frame timbered bunkers built into the sides of bomb craters, each with an average overhead cover 10-feet-thick, the system was connected to a large command bunker by a network of interconnecting tunnels. The command bunker featured an aperture overlooking Con Thien and C-2 and documents found in the bunker indicated that the PAVN had been observing and reporting the movement of helicopters, tanks, and trucks entering and leaving Con Thien and C-2.

Early August saw little contact with the PAVN other than an encounter by Company F, 9th Marines with 30 PAVN, 3 km east of Con Thien. In the face of artillery and fixed-wing support, the PAVN broke contact and the Marines began a sweep through the area during which they regained contact. The PAVN again broke and ran, and Company F moved through the area, capturing a number of weapons and counting 11 PAVN dead.

On 15 August, a PAVN company attacked a four-man Marine reconnaissance team southeast of Con Thien near the abandoned airstrip at Nam Dong. The patrol returned fire and requested reinforcement, while simultaneously calling in preplanned artillery fires. Within minutes a platoon from Company A, 1st Marines, accompanied by three M48 tanks, moved out of positions 1 km away and headed south to assist. The coordinated attack, which included more than 150 rounds of 105mm artillery, 40 rounds of 4.2-inch mortar, 75 rounds from the 90mm guns of the tanks, and airstrikes by Marine UH-1E gunships accounted for several NVA dead.

As PAVN activity continued to increase in the eastern DMZ, particularly north of Con Thien, the Marines decided to act. In addition to sightings of enemy tanks, Marine fighter pilots and aerial observers reported spotting trucks, truck parks, camouflaged revetments, storage bunkers, and trenchlines. Of special interest were repeated sightings of low, slow moving lights during hours of darkness which, it was assumed, came from enemy helicopters thought to be resupplying forward positions with high priority cargo such as ammunition and medical supplies or conducting medevacs. On 19 August, after 60 Arclight strikes 2nd Battalion 1st Marines (2/1) assaulted into three LZs in the Trung Son region of the southern DMZ, 5 km north of Con Thien. Supported by a platoon of tanks from 3rd Tank Battalion, 2/1 swept the area but found no evidence of use by VPAF helicopters. During the extraction one CH-46 Sea Knight was destroyed by a command detonated mine, killing 4 Marines. While the assault claimed no PAVN casualties, it did scatter PAVN forces in the area. On the morning of the 19th, Bravo Company, 2/1 and the Army's Company A, 77th Armored Regiment engaged an enemy platoon while supported by M48s from 3rd Tank Battalion, killing 26 PAVN. 6 km southwest of Con Thien Mike Company, 3/9 Marines intercepted a reinforced PAVN platoon, under the cover of airstrikes and artillery they killed 30 PAVN and captured 2. On 20 August 2 PAVN squads attacked Companies G and H, 2/9 Marines with small arms, RPGs, mortars, and artillery. The Marines, supported by 5 M48s from 3rd Tank Battalion forced the PAVN to withdraw northward, leaving their dead. On 21 July, Company I, 9th Marines began receiving sniper fire and within an hour, the company had engaged a PAVN unit of undetermined size firing small arms and grenades. Responding with accurate rocket, mortar, and artillery fire, the Marines forced the PAVN to break contact and withdraw to the north. A search of the area found 14 NVA dead and 12 weapons.

On 24 August at 17:00, Marine reconnaissance team Tender Rancho was moving 7 km southeast of Con Thien near Dao Xuyen, when it surprised a group of 15 bivouacked PAVN troops killing 6. Within minutes the team received a barrage of 82mm mortars and immediately formed a 360-degree security. 90 minutes later gunships arrived on station and informed the team that the PAVN surrounded them. At 19:30 despite receiving 0.50 caliber and 82mm mortar fire helicopters inserted a reinforced platoon from Company D 1st Marines to assist. Meanwhile, additional platoons from Company D, along with Company C, moving overland from the east took up blocking positions north of the encircled reconnaissance team before dark. At daylight on 25 August, Marine helicopters inserted the remainder of Company D. During the insertion a CH-34, while dodging enemy fire, struck a tree breaking off the tail section, killing 3 and wounding 14. With the arrival of elements of 1/3 Marines and Company M, 3/9 Marines later in the day, the Marines effectively cordoned the area, preventing a PAVN withdrawal. During the remainder of the 25th and into the 26th, as Companies C and D, 1st Marines pushed southward toward the other blocking forces, the PAVN made several unsuccessful attempts to break the cordon. By the end of 26 August, after three days of fighting, the US claimed the PAVN had suffered 78 killed while the Marines suffered 11 killed and 58 wounded.

On 31 August 1 Marines was relieved of responsibility for the Kentucky area of operations and the Army's 1st Brigade, 5th Infantry Division (Mechanized) took over.

On 4 September, a platoon from Company A, 61st Infantry Regiment was sent to the relief of Company M 3/9 Marines which was engaged in battle with a reinforced PAVN company in bunkers west of Con Thien. Joined by a reaction force from Company C, 61st Infantry, and supported by artillery and airstrikes, the American units claimed to have killed more than 20 PAVN for 6 US killed and 55 wounded in the two-and-one-half-hour battle that followed.

On 11 September, Company D, 11th Infantry Regiment engaged a PAVN force of unknown strength from the 27th Independent Regiment occupying bunkers near the "Market Place," 4 km northeast of Con Thien. The Company called for air and artillery strikes while a platoon of tanks from the 1st Battalion, 77th Armored moved up reinforce. At 18:30 the PAVN attempted to break contact, but the artillery prevented their withdrawal. One group of PAVN raised a white flag, so the American gunners ceased fire momentarily to allow the group to surrender, instead the PAVN broke and ran and the artillery barrage resumed. A later sweep of the area found 40 dead PAVN, 7 were captured.

On 13 September following Arclight and naval and land artillery strikes 3 Battalion task forces from the 5th Infantry Division attacked into the DMZ northeast of Con Thien. To the east the ARVN 1st Squadron, 7th Armored Cavalry, supported by two platoons from Company A, 3rd Tank Battalion, simultaneously attacked to the north and northeast of A-2 and Gio Linh. The ARVN achieved almost immediate contact. The Marine tanks providing a base of fire for the advancing ARVN infantry fired 90mm canister and high-explosive rounds and their machine guns to break through the PAVN defenses and claiming to have killed 73 PAVN. Following in the wake of the tanks, and supported by helicopter gunships, the ARVN infantry killed an additional 68 PAVN and captured one. On the left flank, after encountering mines and antitank fire, the three Army task forces joined the action, claiming to have killed 35 PAVN and seizing a large cache of mortar rounds. The allied forces reached their northernmost objectives, turned south, and returned to their bases by late afternoon. The captured PAVN soldier identified his unit as an element of the 138th Regiment which had assumed control of the 27th Independent Regiment's area of operations, due to the heavy casualties suffered by the regiment in recent months.

In late September heavy monsoon rains had swollen the Ben Hai River, forcing remnants of the PAVN 320th Division and independent regiments north across the river, but military intelligence indicated that some groups had been trapped in the south by the rising water. On 26 September Companies B, C, and D, 11th Infantry moved out from positions at C-2 and C-2 Bridge. In coordination with the ARVN 2nd and 3rd Battalions, 2nd Regiment, and the 3rd Marines, the companies moved to a position west of Con Thien and then attacked north across the southern boundary of the DMZ, toward the Dong Be Lao mountain complex. During an 8-day patrol into the DMZ, they encountered minimal opposition from the PAVN rearguard. Searches of numerous bunkers and other complexes indicated that the PAVN had only recently abandoned the positions.

On 11 October a brigade mechanized infantry and tank force, composed of Companies B and C, 61st Infantry and Company B, 77th Armored, engaged a platoon of PAVN in heavily fortified bunkers, 2.5 km northeast of Con Thien. The PAVN used RPGs and 60mm mortars to knock out 3 M48s and one M113. Mines disabled another two M48s and one M113, killing 3 and wounding 20. After five hours of battle 26 PAVN were killed.

Despite heavy rain during October, ground and aerial reconnaissance missions indicated the presence of a sizable PAVN force south of the Ben Hai River between Gio Linh and Con Thien. On 23 October the brigade task force, composed of three companies of the dismounted 1/61st Infantry attacked north from A-3 and Con Thien into the DMZ and then eastward along the Ben Hai River toward the 2nd ARVN Regiment and Company H, 9th Marines which had earlier trapped a PAVN force and claiming to have killed 112. As the task force continued eastward during the 24th, through Kinh Mon, Tan Mon, and An Xa along an abandoned railroad, Company A engaged a PAVN platoon, killing seven. At 08:30 on 25 October, Company A encountered a PAVN battalion in well-fortified bunkers, while Company B came under heavy small arms and mortar fire. By 10:30 the engaged companies had linked up, and while Company A attacked to the northeast against the enemy's flank, Company B assaulted and overran the enemy position, capturing one 82mm mortar, two 60mm mortars, and two 0.50-caliber machine guns. Both companies, later reinforced by Company B, 77th Armor, remained in contact until 18:00 killing 231 PAVN for the loss of 4 killed and 24 wounded.

On 22 October General Abrams, COMUSMACV ordered all construction and planning efforts associated with the anti-infiltration effort halted. Under the new plan, referred to as Duel Blade, allied forces, supported by air, artillery, and naval gunfire, would maintain a mobile posture and actively resist infiltration from the North by maintaining a comprehensive surveillance effort. While ground reconnaissance would be a part of the effort, attended and unattended detection devices or sensors would provide a majority of the surveillance capability. As part of the implementation of Duel Blade the "A" and "C" strongpoint sites considered essential would be used as fire support bases, while those of no value, such as A-3 and C-3, would be closed.

With effect from 21:00 on 1 November the US ceased all offensive operations against the territory of North Vietnam. This prohibition also applied to offensive operations north of the DMZ's southern boundary. General Abrams later sought and obtained authority to send squad-size patrols into the southern DMZ to capture prisoners and obtain intelligence on the PAVN military buildup in the DMZ.

On 1 November, the 1st Brigade, 5th Infantry Division, was directed to move from the Kentucky area of operations into an area near Quang Tri City. The 3rd Marines supported by the 3rd Tank Battalion assumed control of the Kentucky area. As a sign of the reduced PAVN activity in the Kentucky area, by December only Company E, 2/3 Marines was responsible for the security for Con Thien and C-2 Bridge, as well as patrolling and ambushing throughout its assigned 54-square kilometer area.
