= Operation Hickory =

Part of the Vietnam War (1967)

- Part of the Vietnam War
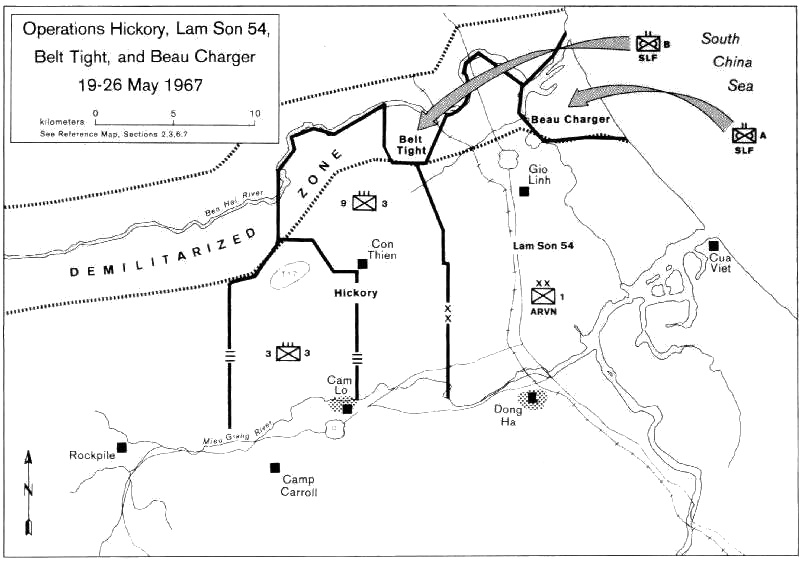
- Map of Operations Hickory, Belt Tight, Beau Charger and Lam Son 54
Date	18 – 28 May 1967
Location	Leatherneck Square, Quảng Trị Province
Result	Inconclusive

Belligerents
United States; South Vietnam	North Vietnam

Commanders and leaders
Robert E. Cushman Jr.	Unknown

Units involved
2nd Battalion, 3rd Marines; 3rd Battalion, 4th Marines; 1st Battalion, 9th Marines; 2nd Battalion, 9th Marines; 3rd Battalion, 9th Marines; 1st Battalion, 12th Marines; 2nd Battalion, 26th Marines	324B Division

Casualties and losses
(United States) 142 killed (South Vietnam) 22 killed	US body count 304 killed 30 captured

Operation Hickory was a search and destroy operation conducted by the 3rd Marine Division in the area around Con Thien, Quảng Trị Province known as Leatherneck Square from 18 to 28 May 1967. Operation Hickory was the first authorized incursion into the Vietnamese Demilitarized Zone (DMZ).

== Background ==
Following the 8 May attack on Con Thien, recognizing that the People's Army of Vietnam (PAVN) were using the DMZ as a sanctuary for attacks into I Corps, Washington lifted the prohibition on US forces entering the DMZ and MACV authorized the III Marine Amphibious Force (III MAF) to conduct combat operations into the southern half of the DMZ.

From 13–16 May, 1st Battalion, 9th Marines clearing Route 561 from Cam Lộ Combat Base to Con Thien fought a well-entrenched PAVN force south of the base. The PAVN subsequently withdrew into the DMZ.

III MAF proceeded to plan a series of combined operations with Army of the Republic of Vietnam (ARVN) forces to take place from 18 to 26 May. Under Operation Hickory the 3rd Marine Regiment would advance to the Bến Hải River. Under Operation Lam Son 54 the ARVN 1st Division would advance up Route 1 parallel to the 3rd Marines while the amphibious Special Landing Force Alpha secured the coastline south of the Bến Hải River under Operation Beau Charger and Special Landing Force Bravo would link up with 3rd Marines under Operation Belt Tight. Once at the Bến Hải River, the forces would sweep south on a broad front to Route 9.

== Operation ==
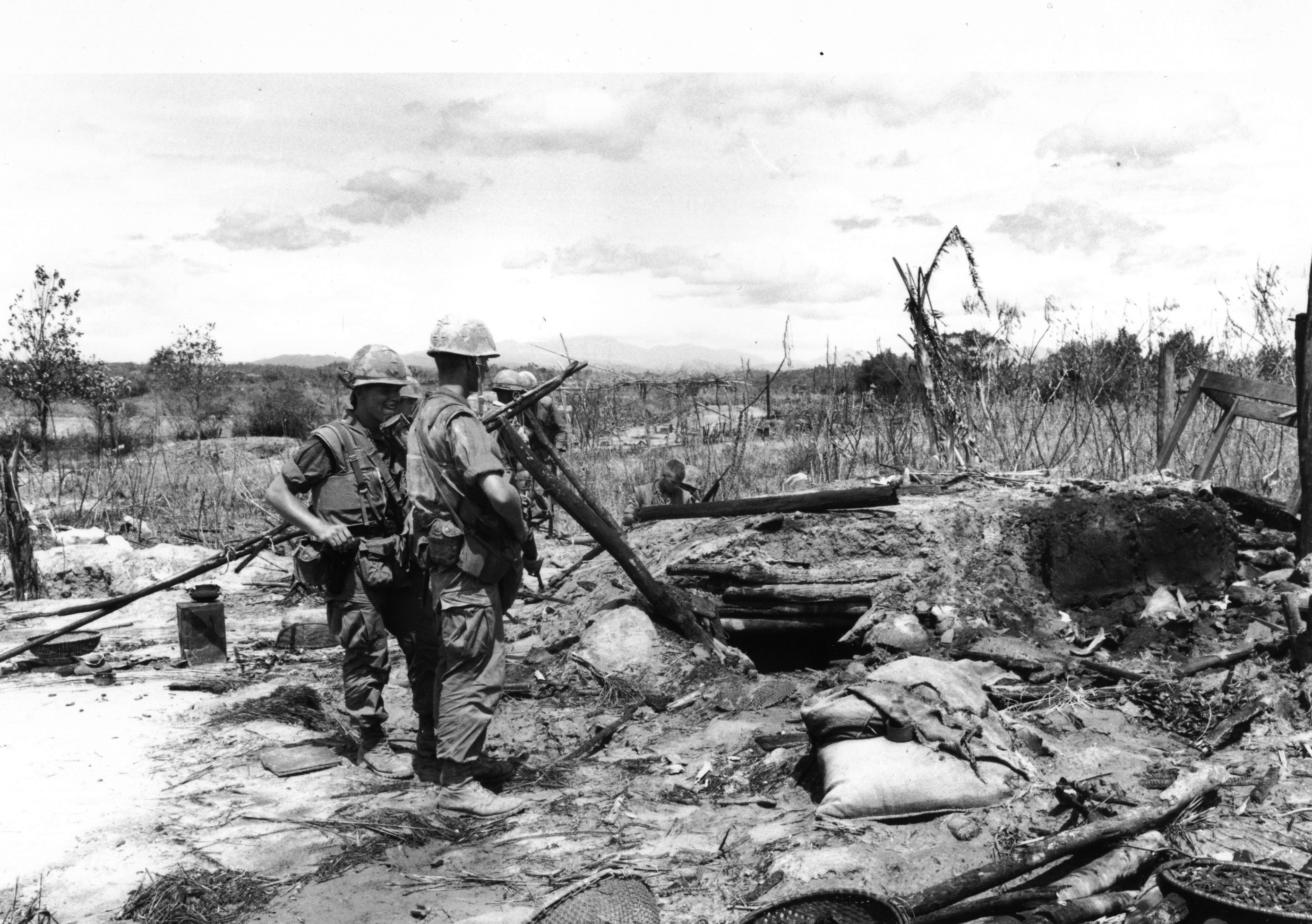
PAVN bunker discovered by 3/4 Marines on 18 May 1967

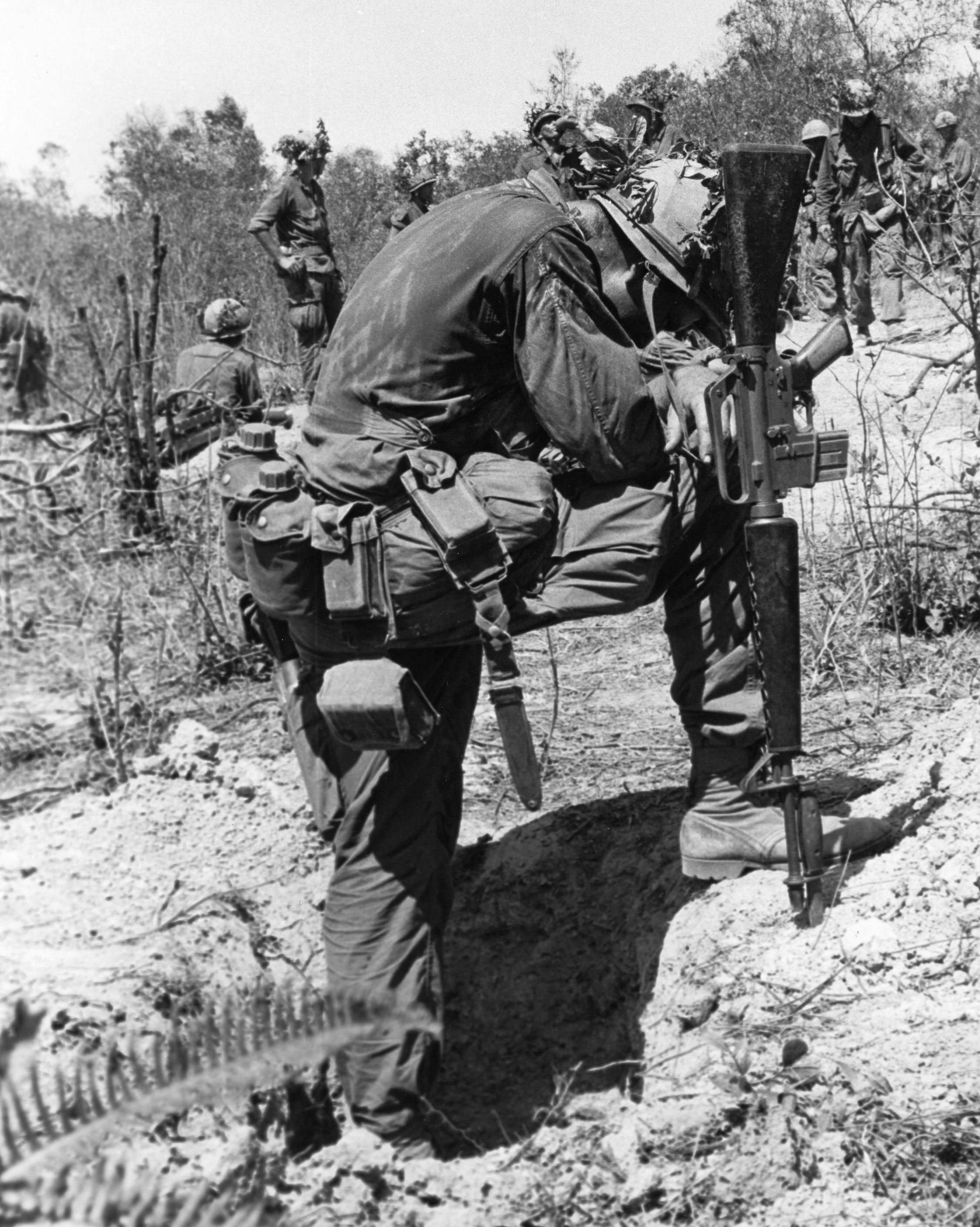
A 9th Regiment Marine mourns the loss of a friend

On the morning of 18 May, the 2nd Battalion, 26th Marines and the 2nd Battalion, 9th Marines, advanced north from Con Thien to press any PAVN against a blocking force from the 3rd Battalion, 4th Marines that landed by helicopters on the Bến Hải River. At 10:00, 2/26 Marines made contact with two PAVN Battalions in bunkers and trenches. The 2/9 Marines joined 2/26 Marines and fought a running battle until nightfall. 5 Marines were killed and 142 were wounded, while 31 PAVN were killed. That night 75 radar-controlled airstrikes were called in on the bunker complex. At 07:00 on 19 May after 2 hours of artillery preparation (in which short rounds killed 3 Marines), the 2/26 Marines proceeded to attack the bunker complex, overrunning it by 10:30 killing 34 PAVN. At 13:30, 2/9 Marines met heavy automatic weapons and mortar fire and an M48 tank moved up to silence the PAVN positions with canister fire. Two M48s were later knocked out by RPG-2 fire and 2/9 Marines suffered 7 killed and 12 wounded.

On 20 May, 3rd Battalion, 9th Marines covering the left flank of the operation encountered a PAVN bunker complex and in fighting lasting into 21 May losing 26 killed and 59 wounded and claiming that the PAVN suffered 36 dead. The reserve Special Landing Force Bravo 2nd Battalion, 3rd Marines joined the operation on 20 May landing by helicopter northwest of Firebase Gio Linh. They swept the area north to the DMZ meeting minimal resistance but discovering PAVN bunkers and supplies.

On 25 May, H Company, 2/26 Marines, engaged a large PAVN Company at the base of Hill 117 (16.907°N 106.907°E) 5 km west of Con Thien. H Company joined by K Company, 3/4 Marines, made repeated advances up the hill against the PAVN with heavy fighting lasting throughout the day and cost 14 Marines and corpsmen killed and 92 wounded and claimed 41 PAVN killed. Marine air and artillery pounded the top of the hill throughout the night and a new assault was planned for the morning of 26 May, but PAVN fire brought down a UH-1E injuring the command element and the assault was postponed until 27 May when E and F Companies, 2/26 Marines and 3/4 Marines secured the hilltop with no resistance.

For the remainder of Operation Hickory the Marines encountered only scattered resistance but discovered and destroyed numerous bunkers, ordnance and rice.

From 19 to 27 May when Lam Son 54 ended the ARVN were in constant contact with the PAVN 31st and 812th Regiments. The ARVN suffered 22 killed and 122 wounded, while claiming that the PAVN suffered 342 killed and 30 captured.

The amphibious element of Operation Beau Charger met no opposition, while the heliborne assault dropped into a hot landing zone. Only one platoon was landed and it remained isolated until rescued several hours later. Beau Charger continued until 26 May with minimal contact. 85 PAVN were killed.

== Aftermath ==
Operation Hickory concluded on 28 May, the Marines had suffered 142 killed and 896 wounded and claimed that 362 PAVN were killed. Lam Son 54, Hickory, Belt Tight and Beau Charger also resulted in the removal of the entire civilian population from the area with the result that it was all now a free fire zone.
