= Joe Paul =

Joe Paul may refer to:

- Joe C. Paul (1946–1965), United States Marine and Medal of Honor recipient
- Joe Paul (footballer) (1904–1962), Australian rules footballer
- Joe Paul (lyricist), Indian lyricist and music composer
