= 2nd Battalion, 4th Marines =

2nd Battalion, 4th Marine Regiment
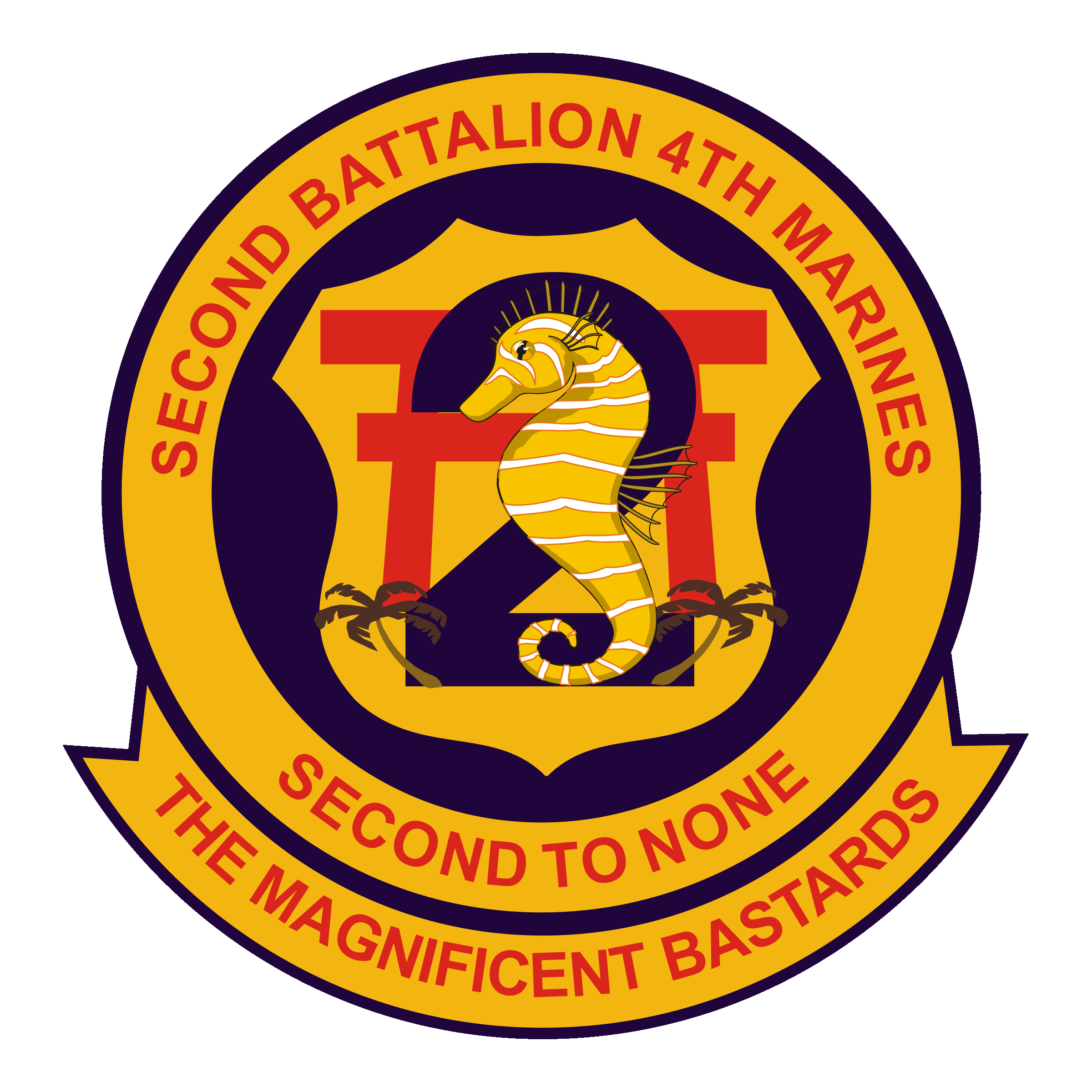
- 2nd Battalion, 4th Marine Regiment insignia
- Active: April 1914 – 4 October 1927; 18 September 1932 – 6 May 1942; 1 February 1944 – February 1946; 2 September 1952 – present
- Allegiance: United States of America
- Branch: United States Marine Corps
- Type: Infantry battalion
- Role: Locate, close with and destroy the enemy by fire and maneuver, or to repel the enemy's assault by fire and close combat.
- Size: 1,100
- Part of: 4th Marine Regiment; 1st Marine Division
- Garrison/HQ: Marine Corps Base Camp Pendleton
- Nickname: The Magnificent Bastards
- Motto: "Second to None"
- Engagements: 'Banana Wars: Occupation of the Dominican Republic; World War II: Battle of Guam; Battle of Okinawa; Vietnam War: Operation Starlite; Operation Jay; Operation Hastings; Operation Prairie; Operation Prairie IV; Operation Kingfisher; Operation Lancaster II; Operation Scotland II; Operation Napoleon/Saline; Battle of Dai Do; Operation Sharp Edge; Operation Desert Storm; Operation Desert Fox; War on terror: Operation Iraqi Freedom; Operation Enduring Freedom

Commanders
- Current commander: LtCol Patrick C Holland
- Notable commanders: Roswell Winans; Lyle H. Miller; Foster LaHue; William Weise

2nd Battalion, 4th Marines (2/4) is an infantry battalion of the United States Marine Corps. The battalion, nicknamed the Magnificent Bastards from the Vietnam War, is based out of Marine Corps Base Camp Pendleton, California and is a part of the 5th Marine Regiment and 1st Marine Division.

== Subordinate units ==
- Company E (Echo Company)
- Company F (Fox Company)
- Company G (Golf Company)
- Company H (Hotel Company - not currently in use; company designation reserved for augmentation of a fourth rifle company into the battalion as needed)
- Weapons Company

== History ==
=== Early years ===
2nd Battalion, 4th Marines was constituted in April 1914 during World War I when it was activated as one of the three battalions of the 4th Marine Regiment. Shortly after being activated, the battalion deployed to Mexico as part of the punitive expedition led by General John J. Pershing. The presence of American forces offshore proved to be sufficient pressure on the Mexican government to act to end the threat to Americans.

In 1916, civil war broke out in the Dominican Republic and the Dominican Government was unable to end the strife. President Woodrow Wilson dispatched American forces. 2/4 went ashore in the Dominican Republic and, after several clashes with rebel forces, successfully put down the revolution. Occupation duty followed pending the establishment of an elected government. The battalion departed the Dominican Republic in August 1924 for San Diego, California.

During October 1926 the Federal government directed the Marine Corps to furnish units to guard the mail because the postal service had experienced several robberies. The battalion was directed to safeguard mail transported by rail and truck west of the Mississippi river. The robberies promptly stopped.

In April 1927 the battalion was ordered to Tientsin, China. Their mission was to reinforce U.S. forces already in place against rebelling Chinese nationalist forces. On 4 October 1927, 2/4 was re-designated as 2nd Battalion, 12th Marines. With this re-designation, 2/4's lineage and honors were transferred to 2/12. A new 2/4 would be activated in the future, but for lineage and honors purposes it would in no way be connected with the old 2/4.

On 18 September 1932 in Shanghai, China the new 2/4 was activated. This began the lineage of the 2/4 we know today. The battalion supported the American sector of Shanghai after fighting nearby had broken out between Chinese and Japanese forces. In May 1940 2/4 got a new Battalion XO. His name was Chesty Puller. Later he became the battalion's CO. The battalion's presence deterred a Japanese takeover of the settlement after they had driven Chinese forces from the surrounding area.

=== World War II ===
Deteriorating relations between the United States and Japan caused the 4th Marines to be withdrawn from China in November 1941. The battalion transferred to Subic Bay, Republic of the Philippines and was given the task of protecting the Olongapo Naval Station. The battalion was ordered to move to the island fortress of Corregidor in the mouth of Manila Bay after the attack on Pearl Harbor. After unrelenting bombardment the Japanese launched an amphibious assault on the island in May 1942. Though under-equipped and outnumbered, the Fourth Marine Regiment fought valiantly; they were eventually forced to surrender on 6 May 1942 under orders from Major General Jonathan Mayhew Wainwright IV, U.S. Army.

On 1 February 1944, the battalion was reactivated on Guadalcanal with the marines from Fourth Battalion, First Raider Regiment. The battalion's first assignment was to take part in the assault on Emirau Island. During the remainder of World War II the battalion saw action in the Battles of Guam (2/4 was the first ashore) and of Okinawa. On Okinawa, the battalion was involved in the fighting for the Motobu Peninsula, the capture of Naha, and the assault on the Oruku Peninsula. Once organized resistance ended, the regiment was redeployed to Guam to prepare for the assault on mainland Japan.

Following the surrender of Japan, Fourth Marines seized and occupied the large naval base at Yokosuka in Tokyo Bay. This gesture was designed to avenge the capture of the "Old Fourth" on Corregidor. The marines of Second Battalion, Fourth Marines were the first American combat troops to set foot in Mainland Japan, landing on Futtsu Cape. They were sent ashore to ensure the approaches to Tokyo Bay were secure. During the latter part of 1945 the battalion maintained perimeter defense for the Yokosuka Naval Base. On 1 January 1946 the battalion was relieved of all duties in Japan and sailed for Camp Pendleton, California. In February, as part of the demobilization, 2/4 was deactivated. 2/4 was reactivated on 8 March 1946 in Tsingtao, China. Its first mission was to assist in repatriation of Japanese civilian and military personnel, as well as provide security for the American Naval base at Tsingtao. The battalion was relieved of this mission and sailed for Camp Lejeune, North Carolina in September 1946. 2/4 was again deactivated on 18 November 1947.

=== The 1950s and 1960s ===
The battalion was reactivated on 2 September 1952 for the Korean War; however, they did not see action because of the end of hostilities. The battalion arrived in Japan as part of the Fourth Marines on 24 August 1953 and was assigned the mission of defending southern Japan. To maintain its combat readiness the battalion trained in amphibious operations on Iwo Jima and Okinawa. The Fourth Marine Regiment was transferred to Hawaii in 1953 and here the battalion became part of the First Marine Brigade. The battalion then settled down for a ten-year tour of duty.

=== Vietnam War ===
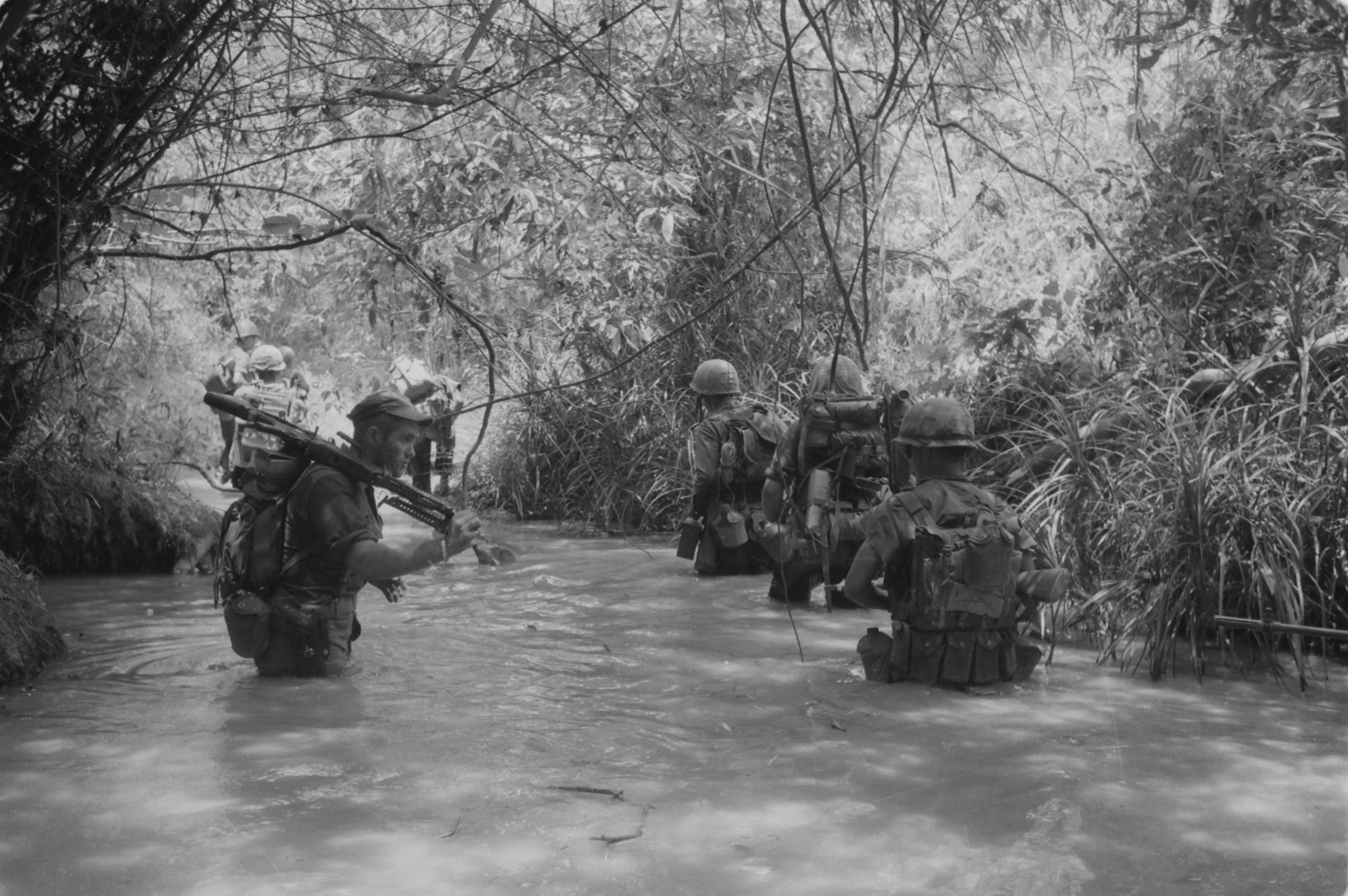
Marines of Company H, 2nd Battalion, 4th Marine Regiment take to the water as they move to join up with other elements of their battalion.

2nd Battalion 4th Marines was once again committed to ground combat operations, this time in South Vietnam. In May 1965 the battalion landed at LZ Blue (west of Green Beach) near Chu Lai. The first combined land operation of the war was Operation Lien Ket 4 between 2/4 and 3rd Battalion, Republic of Vietnam Marine Division on 28 July. The first major engagement for the battalion was Operation Starlite (the first regimental sized battle for American forces since the Korean War) in August 1965. It was a combined amphibious/helicopter borne assault on enemy fortified positions of the Van Tuong Peninsula, 15 miles (24 km) south of the Chu Lai Air Base. Six days after the operation had begun; the 1st Vietcong Regiment was decisively defeated. During this operation, Lance Corporal Joe C. Paul (H Co.) became the battalion's first Medal of Honor recipient. Total losses for both sides were 52 marines killed and over 200 were wounded. Vietcong (VC) losses were over 600 killed and 9 POW's. There were 2 Medals of Honor, 6 Navy Crosses and 14 Silver Stars.

As a result of Operation Starlite, Col. Joseph R. "Bull" Fisher established a small unit of 30 marines plus one sergeant in charge. This unit became known as "The Bull's Raiders". The S/2 Scouts, which consisted of 12 marines, was used to make up this unit plus additional Marine volunteers, mostly E-4 Corporals with specialized skills. Their mission was to act as shock troops, combat intelligence, and a quick reaction force. A new intelligence gathering tactic was established known as "hunter / killer" patrols. One squad, or 10 Marine Raiders would be sent by helicopter to a staging area where they would break up into five, two-man teams. They would then scatter in all directions, gather intelligence, and re-locate to a pickup point at a given time. These patrols were conducted mostly around the Ho Chi Minh Trail area. These Marine Raiders were also used as the first Combined Action Program (CAP) unit to work with the South Vietnamese Popular Force within Vietnamese villages located within the Tactical Area of Responsibility that the battalion was assigned. Their intelligence gathering aided in the discovery of People's Army of Vietnam (PAVN) units in this area. This information along with other intelligence began Operation Harvest Moon in December 1965.

Operation Harvest Moon was the second major conflict that the 3rd Marine Division 3rd Marine Regiment, 9th Marine Regiment and 7th Marine Regiment along with ARVN forces fought. This operation took place in Quang Tin Province 23 miles (37 km) northwest of Chu Lai.

Beginning in 1966, combat operations measurably increased with the battalion participating in Operation Double Eagle and Operation Hastings, a coordinated Marine/Army of the Republic of Vietnam (ARVN) search and destroy mission. Operation Prairie was one of the first operations that was fought in the hills west of Leatherneck Square. During this operation, Captain Howard V. Lee (E Co.) became the battalion's second Medal of Honor recipient. Total Marines losses were put at 200 killed and over 1,000 wounded. The PAVN 324B Division losses were put at 1,329 killed and seven POW's. On 25 June 1966 Operation Jay began about 30 kilometers northwest of Huế, and lasted nine days. 2/4 landed north of the PAVN 812th Main Force Battalion, and other Marine units landed south of the PAVN position. Caught in between the two Marine units, the PAVN suffered over 80 dead in nine days of fighting. The moniker of "The Magnificent Bastards" was first used by the incoming Battalion Commander, Lt.Col. Joseph R. "Bull" Fisher the day he assumed his command on 4 June 1964. On 24 September 1966, Battalion Order No. 5600.1B, was signed. It officially added (by legal order) the lower pennant with the nickname the "Magnificent Bastards".

The next major confrontation was with 324B NDivision (8,000 to 10,000 soldiers) came during the siege of Con Thien in the summer and fall of 1967. This was called Operation Kingfisher and ran from 16 July through 31 October. The battalion arrived in the area around the second week of September. On the 14th, Echo Company lost five men due to PAVN artillery north of Cam Lo. On the 16th and 17th, Đông Hà Combat Base reported over 17" rain in one 24-hour period around Con Thien. 25 September was the largest single day for PAVN artillery. The hill and surrounding areas was hit with nearly 1500 (130 mm and 152 mm) rounds. The battalion took several killed. 2/4 was involved in three major battles during this period. Phu Oc (21 September), Washout Bridge or "Bastard's Bridge" (14 October) and Hill 48 (25-7 October). The battalion commanding officer LtCol James W Hammond was wounded and the battalion executive officer was killed. The PAVN was stopped in their attempt to overrun the American outpost. 2/4 started this operation with 952 marines. Six weeks later they left Leatherneck Square with about 300 men still fit for duty. Total casualties for Operation Kingfisher were 340 marines killed, over 3,000 marines wounded. PAVN losses were over 1,100 killed and five POWs. During this period of bloody fighting Sergeant Paul H. Foster (CP) and Lance Corporal Jedh Colby Barker (Fox Co.) were awarded the Medal of Honor (posthumously) for their actions during these battles. There were also nine Navy Cross awarded at this time. In September General Westmoreland (Commander of U.S. forces in Vietnam) declared that the fighting on the DMZ around Con Thien was the heaviest in conventional firepower in the history of warfare. With the help of 71 B-52 sorties, offshore naval gunfire and the support of all the fire bases in Northern I Corps, the marines held their ground. On 28 October Lt. General Cushman (head of all marines in Vietnam) sent a message to the battalion that read (last line) "2/4 has met and beaten the best the enemy had to offer. Well done".

The 1968 Tet Offensive resulted in an increase in fighting along the DMZ. A bitter clash started 30 April and ran through 3 May between 2/4 and the PAVN 320th Division (8,000 to 10,000 soldiers) that broke out northeast of Đông Hà. To protect the base and also the 3rd Marine Division headquarters, 2/4 reinforced by B/1/3 was moved forward to seize the fortified village and area around Dai Do. The three day Battle of Dai Do was costly for both sides. The PAVN lost nearly 1,500 killed, while 2/4 suffered 81 dead and 397 wounded. The battalion commanding officer LtCol. William Weise received the Navy Cross and two company commanders, Captain James E. Livingston (E Co.) and Captain Jay R. Vargas (G Co.) were awarded the Medal of Honor for their bravery and leadership. By 15 May the PAVN were driven back north across the DMZ. Total losses for the Marines were 233 killed and 821 wounded. PAVN losses were put at 2,945 killed and 47 POW's.

The other major operations that 2/4 was involved in were Operation Lancaster II ran from 21 January to 23 November 1968. This was a multiple battalion operation was to secure Route 9 between Cam Lộ and Ca Lu. Total losses were 359 marines killed 1,713 wounded; PAVN losses were put at 1,801.Operation Napoleon/Saline ran from 29 February to 12 September 1968 and was another multi-battalion operation that covered the Cua Viet river area near the South China Sea. Total losses were put at 117 marines killed; PAVN losses were put at 3,495. Operation Scotland II was a multi-battalion operation that ran from 15 April 1968 to 28 February 1969 in the Khe Sanh area. Total losses were put at 435 marines killed 2,396 wounded; PAVN losses were put at 3,304.

On 6 November 1969, 2/4 was withdrawn to Okinawa as part of the United States policy of gradually turning the war over to the South Vietnamese.

In the early 1970s, 2/4 participated with other units from the 3rd Marine Division in providing Battalion Landing Teams as part of the Special Landing Force (SLF) off the coast of Vietnam. During the 1972 Easter Offensive, 2/4 actively supported Vietnamese Marines, U.S. Army Rangers and U.S. advisors ashore, from nearby amphibious ships.

During the summer of 1972 the battalion participated in a massive disaster relief effort, Operation Saklolo conducted in the northern part of the Philippines. On 12 April 1975, 2/4 took part in Operation Eagle Pull, the evacuation of Americans from Phnom Penh, Cambodia. On 29–30 April they took part in Operation Frequent Wind, the evacuation of Saigon.

=== Post-Vietnam and the 1980s ===
In October 1976 the battalion had fresh marines rotating in to replace those marines rotating to other duty stations fulfilling their twelve-month tour. The new arrivals were mostly just out of Infantry Training School and Officer Candidate School with about thirty percent being seasoned. After thorough and rigorous jungle warfare and raid training these marines were tasked as being the Battalion Landing Team 2/4 and boarded the WESTPAC Fleet headed for more rigorous training in the Philippine Islands and other Ports of call for about five months. All were trained in security measures due to the NPA, New People's Army, a communist movement attempting to overthrow the Marcos regime in the Philippines. Around June 1977 a rifle squad from Echo Co was dispatched by helicopter to provide security for the communications Marine LCPL Circles on Retrans Mountain. About 2100 hours, PFC Dan Monette and PFC Richard Palafox noticed a formation of green lights moving in from the near the beach into the jungle headed to the bottom of the cliff toward their position, Squad Leader CPL Jaime Chavez radioed to the rear for support while LCPL Steve Parrilla along with the squad fixed bayonets and formed a defensive position after hearing rocks and debris sliding down below the cliff's edge and remained alert till dawn. When daylight finally broke they were all flown to the rear and briefed by S2 intelligence only to find out 2/4's artillery was zeroed in on the Cliff's edge, a reactionary platoon was on standby and that a Recon Team was inserted and intercepted the green light party found to be village pig hunters, nearly sparking an international incident. Later back aboard ship BLT 2/4 was headed to Australia from Singapore in July 1977 when a U.S. Army helicopter veered off course over the DMZ and was shot down by North Korea killing two on impact, one killed by gunfire on the ground and the other captured. BLT 2/4 made a U-turn and sat in international waters off the coast of the Korean DMZ geared up and ready for action but was called off at the last moment by President Jimmy Carter.

The battalion moved to MCB Camp Lejeune to join the 2nd Marine Regiment in October 1981; they began participating in the Unit Deployment Program (UDP), returning to Camp Schwab, Okinawa after 18 months at Camp Lejeune. While there they participated in several operations and served as the Primary Air Alert Force for the Marine Corps three consecutive years in a row from 1981 to 1985. During its deployment to Okinawa in 1985 under its traditional parent regiment, the 4th Marines, 2/4 took part in training and operations in The Philippines, Diego Garcia, Mainland Japan and in the jungles of northern Okinawa. Truly serving in every clime' and place, after returning from Okinawa and rejoining the 2nd Marine Regiment in October 1985, 2/4 immediately began preparing for cold weather operations in Norway about 270 kilometers north of The Arctic Circle by training with II MEF Special Operations Training Group at Camp Lejeune; at the Marine Corps Mountain Warfare Training Center, Bridgeport, California; at Camp McCoy, Sparta, Wisconsin, and; in late February and early March 1986, deploying to Nordland and Troms counties of Norway, near Evenes and Brøstadbotn, as the main US ski-mobile maneuver element of the 4th Marine Amphibious Brigade commanded by then Brigadier General Carl E Mundy, Jr, taking a leading role in the multi-national NATO winter exercise, "Anchor Express". The wintry, subfreezing weather, unprecedented snow accumulations, and the rugged terrain in the operating area of "Anchor Express" astride Salangenfjord, Faksfjorden and Lavangenfjord tested 2/4's ski-borne Marines to their limits. Such were the deep snow accumulations, extremely steep mountains in fjord country and gusty subzero winds that on 5 March 1986, a devastating avalanche in Vassdalen, Nordland, struck 31 fellow-Norwegian soldiers, killing sixteen engineers from the elite Norwegian Army unit Brigade North, many of whose soldiers operating with 2/4 during the exercise. The Vassdalen avalanche was Norway's worst disaster involving the military since the WWII German invasion of 1940. As a result, Norway went into mourning and the force-on-force exercise prematurely ended. Despite "Anchor Express" being terminated before its scheduled conclusion, many valuable lessons were learned about surviving, maneuvering and fighting in such harsh conditions, providing first-hand observations and experiences related to winter warfare gear, tactics, techniques and procedures. Having endured and excelled operating in tropical, subtropical and Arctic weather conditions within a six month period, by the late 1980s 2/4 was reassigned to the 8th Marine Regiment at Camp Lejeune, NC, to participate in deployments to more temperate climates in The Mediterranean.

The battalion was once again called upon for a real-world contingency mission during the summer of 1990. The West African nation of Liberia was experiencing a civil war. The battalion, as the ground combat element (GCE) for the 22nd Marine Expeditionary Unit set sail from Toulon, France for Operation Sharp Edge. On 5 August, the battalion was committed to go ashore to take defensive positions at the U.S. Embassy to protect U.S. citizens and foreign nationals. The marines embarked on amphibious shipping on 21 August after having successfully completed a Non-combatant evacuation operation of 1,650 Americans and foreign nationals.

=== The Gulf War and the 1990s ===
Before the Gulf War, in August 1990, elements of 2/4 were deployed ashore to the US Embassy in Monrovia, Liberia as part of Operation Sharp Edge.

In late December 1990, 2/4 deployed by air to Al Jabayl, Saudi Arabia for Operation Desert Shield. During Operation Desert Storm the battalion fought as a Mechanized Infantry Armor Task force (Task Force Spartan) during the 2nd Marine Division's attack into Kuwait. After the cease fire the battalion remained in Kuwait with Eighth Marines and conducted security and contingency operations west of Kuwait City. 2/4 was the last Marine infantry battalion to withdraw from Kuwait, arriving in the U.S. on 15 May 1991.

2/4 participated in Operation Sea Signal. During this deployment, over 2,500 Haitian immigrants were processed aboard the USNS Comfort (T-AH-20), CMV Ivan Franco, and CMV Griuzy. 2/4 also provided security for refugee camps aboard the U.S. Naval Base at Guantanamo Bay, Cuba during this operation.

On 25 July 1994, 2nd Battalion, 4th Marines, then part of the 2nd Marine Division at Camp Lejeune, North Carolina, was redesignated 2nd Battalion, 6th Marines. From 25 July to 1 September 1994, 2nd Battalion, 4th Marines remained in a cadre status. On 2 September 1994 the battalion was moved to Camp Pendleton, California. The battalion replaced 2nd Battalion, 9th Marines at the 5th Marine Regiment

In December 1998, 2/4 participated as the Battalion Landing Team (BLT) for the 31 Marine Expeditionary Unit Special Operations Capable (MEUSOC). The operation, named "Desert Fox", was a retaliation to Saddam Hussein's refusal to comply with U.N. Security Council Resolutions that led to a coalition air bombing campaign. The marines of 2/4 were also set up in a defense at and around Muttla ridge, in Kuwait, to act as a deterrent for any Iraqi attack on Kuwait that might have followed the air campaign.

=== Global war on terror ===
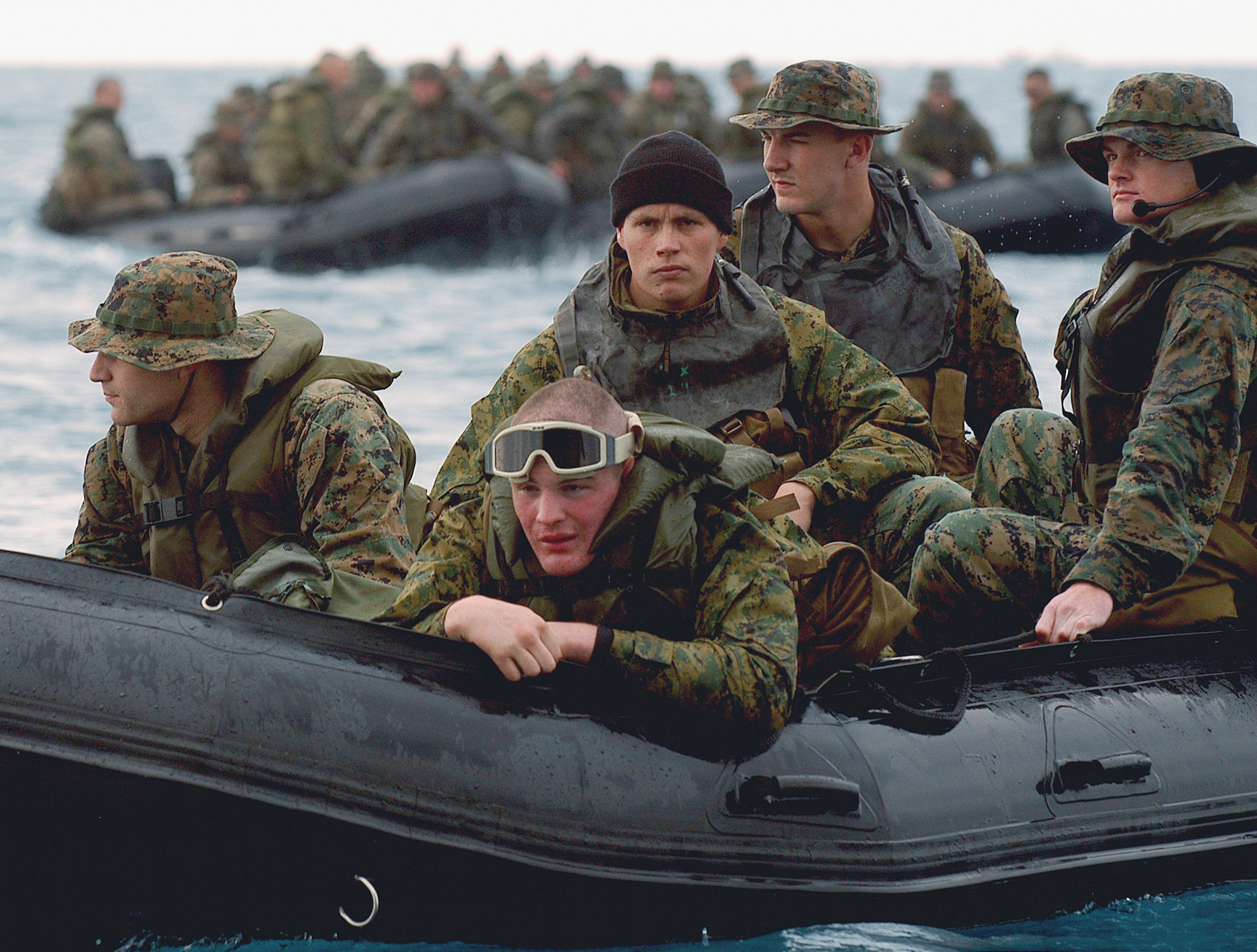
Marines From Fox Co. make an amphibious landing from the USS Harpers Ferry near Okinawa.

From September to December 2001, 2/4 served as the Quick Reaction Force during Operation Noble Eagle for the western half of the United States in response to the 11 September attacks. Leaving shortly after this mission for the 31st Marine Expeditionary Unit in Okinawa, 2/4 was called upon to give humanitarian aid to East Timor and served in country from October to November 2002.

In February 2004, "The Magnificent Bastards" deployed to Ramadi, Iraq, the provincial capital of the Al Anbar Province in support of Operation Iraqi Freedom. The battalion conducted support and stability operations (SASO) until 6 April when insurgent activity simultaneously bursted into a two-day barrage of toe to toe fighting. From then on until their departure in October, insurgent activity was still sporadic and nearly equal in ferocity as the initial battle of 6 and 7 April, therefore the deployment focused on counter-insurgency operations for the remainder of the tour. The unit continued to serve with distinction while engaging insurgent forces in Iraq. Four scout snipers from 2/4 were killed on a rooftop on 21 June 20. While insurgents stole a sniper rifle, it was later recovered by fellow 5th Marines battalion, 3/5, during a mission in Habbaniyah in 2006. 2/4 returned to Camp Pendleton in October 2004.

The battalion then served as part of the Unit Deployment Program tour in Okinawa, mainland Japan, and the Philippines from April to December 2005 with the 31st Marine Expeditionary Unit and in early 2006 they were designated the Battalion Landing Team for the 15th Marine Expeditionary Unit. The battalion arrived in Iraq again as part of the 15th MEU in November 2006. During which Fox and Echo company conducted operations in Ar Ramadi, while the BLT main body operated out of Haditha. Tragically, in February 2007, Battalion Sergeant Major Joseph Ellis was falsely reported to have been killed in a helicopter crash that occurred northwest of Baghdad. He was actually killed by a suicide bomber at a checkpoint.

From January to July 2008, 2/4 deployed to Okinawa, Japan, as the Battalion Landing Team for the 31st Marine Expeditionary Unit. BLT 2/4 spent time in the Philippines for Balikatan 2008, while Fox Company conducted training exercises in Indonesia. In May 2008, the 31st MEU supported Operation Response off the coast of Burma, due to the Cyclone Nargis making landfall in the Irrawaddy Delta.

BLT 2/4 deployed in September 2009 as the Battalion Landing Team for the 11th Marine Expeditionary Unit. The BLT completed training exercises simultaneously with indigenous forces in both East Timor and Indonesia. When not in the jungle training, marines off the USS Cleveland and USS Rushmore conducted live fire-and-maneuver training and Marine Corps Martial Arts Program (MCMAP) with the KORMARS (Indonesian Marines). Additionally, the BLT conducted Military Operations in Urban Terrain (MOUT) and a patrolling package with the Australian Army.

In May 2010, Echo and Fox Company deployed as reduced infantry companies to Afghanistan in support of Operation Enduring Freedom, engaging in combat operations in Marjah and Sangin respectively.

In September 2011, the battalion deployed to Helmand Province, Afghanistan, in support of Operation Enduring Freedom, as part of Regimental Combat Team-5 (RCT-5), assuming responsibility for the districts of Now Zad and Musa Qal'ah. Golf company freed a village from a Taliban stranglehold, allowing villagers to return and vote in district council elections for the first time in history. Echo, Fox and Golf companies also accomplished another first, establishing a police station in another strategically located village where none had existed before. Weapons Company and Golf Company made significant strides engaging locals in Now Zad to help spur Afghan police force growth and improve security. Last but not least, H&S Company supported the retrograde by shipping 25 ISO containers of equipment back to Camp Leatherneck. The battalion returned to Camp Pendleton in April 2012 and had a change of command ceremony in June 2012.

In late May 2013, 2/4 deployed to Okinawa, Japan, as a Battalion Landing Team (BLT) as part of the 31st Marine Expeditionary Unit. In late June 2013, BLT 2/4 embarked on ships from Task Force 76 and began a three-month patrol in the Western Pacific Ocean. During the patrol, BLT 2/4 participated in two major exercises in Australia: Exercise Talisman Sabre in the Shoalwater Bay Training Area and Exercise Koolendong in the Bradshaw Field Training Area. BLT 2/4 returned to Okinawa in late September and redeployed to Camp Pendleton in November 2013.

In January 2014, marines and sailors of 2/4's Fox, Weapons, and Headquarters and Service Companies traveled to Singapore to conduct bilateral training with Singapore Guardsmen. During the exercise they participated in live-fire training, conditioning hikes, and exchanged tactics.

In June 2014, marines with 2/4 and 2/7 conducted fast-rope and rappel training during a two-and-a-half-week Helicopter Rope Suspension Technique course aboard Camp Pendleton. In July 2014, 2/4 participated in a Battalion Field Exercise at the Infantry Immersion Trainer (IIT) aboard Marine Corps Base Camp Pendleton. During the exercise, marines conducted patrols through urban terrain provided by the IIT.

== 2/4 Medal of Honor recipients ==
- Lance Corporal Joe C. Paul
- Captain Howard V. Lee
- Sergeant Paul Hellstrom Foster
- Lance Corporal Jedh Colby Barker
- Captain James E. Livingston
- Captain Jay R. Vargas

== Notable former members ==
- Hank Bauer, served in G Company during World War II
- Chesty Puller, served as Battalion XO and then CO
- Lyle H. Miller, commanded the battalion in 1932-1933
- James Mattis, served as a rifle and weapons platoon commander
- Robert Mueller, served in H Company during the Vietnam War
- Foster LaHue, commanded the battalion in 1957-59
- Carl Epting Mundy Jr., Commanding Officer
- Lewis G. Lee, battalion Sgt. Major became the 13th Sgt. Major of the Marine Corps

== Unit awards ==
A unit citation or commendation is an award bestowed upon an organization for the action cited. Members of the unit who participated in said actions are allowed to wear on their uniforms the awarded unit citation. 2nd Battalion, 4th Marines has been presented with the following awards:

| Streamer | Award | Year(s) | Additional Info |
|---|---|---|---|
| | Presidential Unit Citation Streamer with two Bronze Stars | 1945, 1965–1967, 1966–1967 | Okinawa, Vietnam |
| | Presidential Unit Citation Streamer (Army) with one Bronze Stars | 1941, 1941–42 | Philippines |
| | Navy Unit Commendation Streamer with one Silver Star | 1944, 1965, 1968, 1975, 1990, 1990-1 | Guam, Vietnam, Southeast Asia Evacuations, Liberia, Desert Storm |
| | Meritorious Unit Commendation Streamer | 1968, 1975 | Vietnam, Southeast Asia Evacuations |
| | Marine Corps Expeditionary Streamer with one Bronze Star | | |
| | Yangtze Service Streamer | | |
| | China Service Streamer with one Bronze Star | September 1946 - June 1947 | North China |
| | American Defense Service Streamer with one Bronze Star | 1941 | World War II |
| | Asiatic-Pacific Campaign Streamer with one Silver | | |
| | World War II Victory Streamer | 1941–1945 | Pacific War |
| | Navy Occupation Service Streamer with "ASIA" clasp | | |
| | National Defense Service Streamer with three Bronze Stars | 1950–1954, 1961–1974, 1990–1995, 2001–present | Korean War, Vietnam War, Gulf War, war on terrorism |
| | Armed Forces Expeditionary Streamer with one Bronze Star | 1992–1993 | Somalia |
| | Vietnam Service Streamer with two Silver and one Bronze Stars | | |
| | Southwest Asia Service Streamer with three Bronze Stars | September 1990 - February 1991 | Desert Shield, Desert Storm |
| | Philippine Defense Streamer | | |
| | Philippine Presidential Unit Citation Streamer | | |
| | Iraq Campaign Streamer | | |
| | Global War on Terrorism Expeditionary Streamer | | March - May 2003 |
| | Global War on Terrorism Service Streamer | 2001–present | |
| | Vietnam Gallantry Cross with Palm Streamer | | |
| | Vietnam Meritorious Unit Citation Civil Actions Streamer | | |

== See also ==
- China Marines
- List of United States Marine Corps battalions
- Organization of the United States Marine Corps
