= Jedh Colby Barker =

US Marine, Medal of Honor recipients

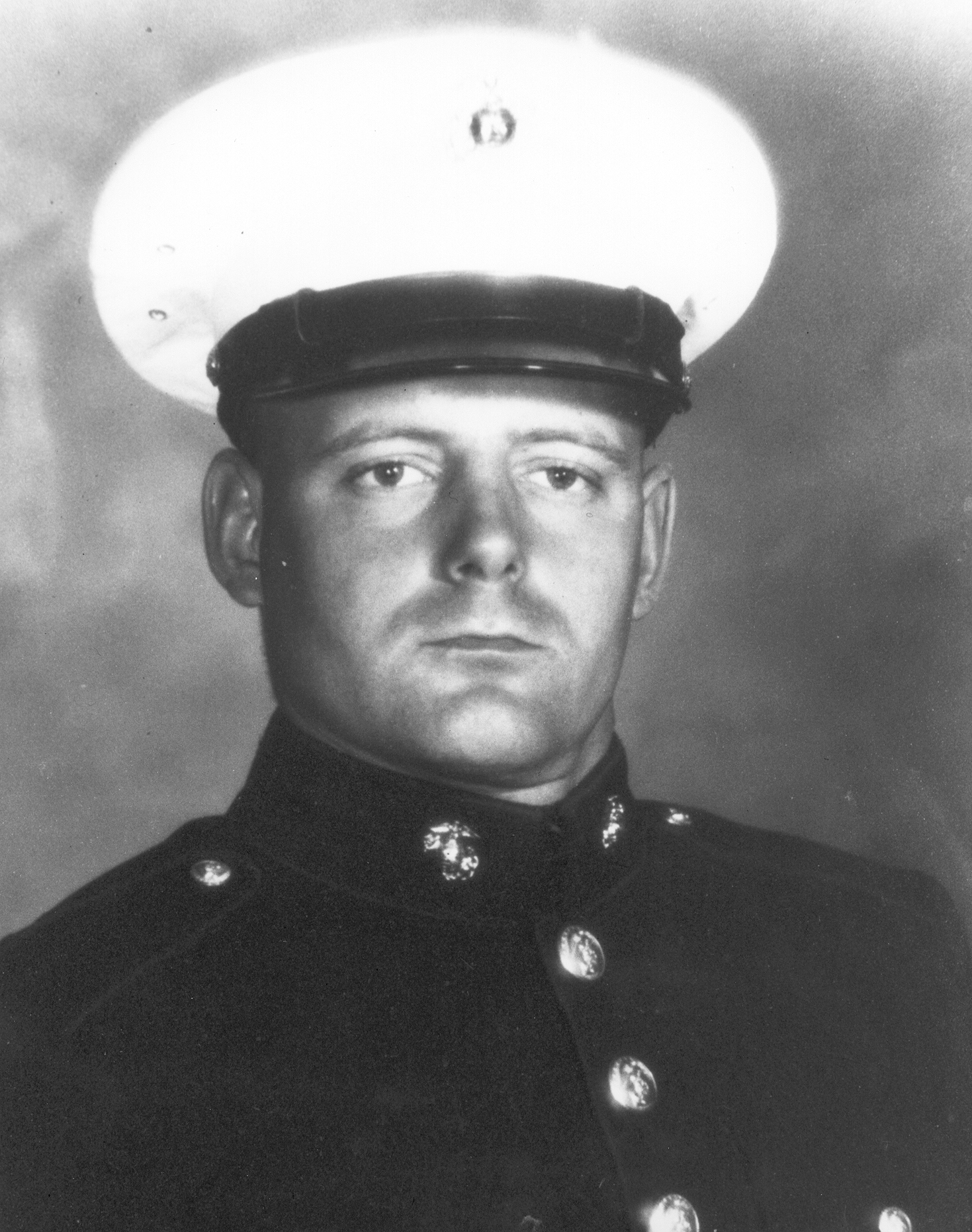
- Jedh C. Barker, Medal of Honor recipient
- Born: June 20, 1945; Franklin, New Hampshire, U.S.
- Died: September 21, 1967 (aged 22); Leatherneck Square, near Con Thien, Quang Tri Province, Republic of Vietnam
- Burial place: George Washington Memorial Park, Paramus, New Jersey
- Military career
- Allegiance: United States of America
- Branch: United States Marine Corps
- Service years: 1966–1967
- Rank: Lance Corporal
- Units: Company F, 2nd Battalion, 4th Marine Regiment, 3rd Marine Division
- Conflicts: Vietnam War: Operation Kingfisher (DOW)
- Awards: Medal of Honor (1967); Purple Heart

Jedh Colby Barker (June 20, 1945 – September 21, 1967) was a United States Marine Corps Lance Corporal who posthumously received the Medal of Honor for heroism during the Vietnam War in September 1967.

While participating in Operation Kingfisher, Barker's platoon was attacked by North Vietnamese forces in the western part of the Leatherneck Square. The platoon got into cover, and Barker lay down suppressing fire on the Vietnamese positions. When a grenade was thrown into the American defensive position, Barker jumped onto it and saved the lives of fellow injured Marines.

== Biography ==
Barker was born on June 20, 1945, in Franklin, New Hampshire. At age six, he and his parents moved to Park Ridge, New Jersey, where he graduated from grammar school in 1960 and from Park Ridge High School in 1964. In high school, Barker was captain of the football and baseball teams.

Barker attended Fairleigh Dickinson University, Rutherford, New Jersey, and then Northeast Missouri State Teachers College in Kirksville, Missouri until May 1966. While at Northeast, he was a member of the Bulldogs football team.

On June 20, 1966, his 21st birthday, Barker enlisted in the U.S. Marine Corps Reserve. He was a member of the Special Volunteer Reserve, 1st Marine Corps District, New York, New York, until discharged to enlist in the regular Marine Corps on October 5, 1966.

After completion of recruit training at the Marine Corps Recruit Depot Parris Island, South Carolina, in December 1966, Barker underwent individual combat training and weapons special training with the 2nd Infantry Training Battalion, 1st Infantry Training Regiment, Marine Corps Base, Camp Lejeune, North Carolina. He was promoted to private first class on December 1, 1966, while undergoing individual combat training.

In March 1967, PFC Barker joined Marine Air Base Squadron 21, Marine Aircraft Group 12, 1st Marine Aircraft Wing, San Francisco, California, and served as group guard until the following June when he was reassigned to Fox Company, 2nd Battalion, 4th Marines, 3rd Marine Division, in the Republic of Vietnam. Barker was promoted to Lance Corporal on September 1, 1967. On the morning of September 21 during Operation Kingfisher southeast of Con Thien near Phu Oc, the Battalion was ambushed by the 90th regiment of the 324B Division. Lance Corporal Barker was killed in action during this engagement.

The Medal of Honor was presented to Barker's family by Vice President Spiro Agnew in ceremonies held on October 31, 1969.

Lance Corporal Barker was buried at the George Washington Memorial Park in Paramus, New Jersey.

== Medal of Honor citation ==
The President of the United States in the name of the Congress takes pride in presenting the MEDAL OF HONOR posthumously to

LANCE CORPORAL JEDH C. BARKER
UNITED STATES MARINE CORPS

for service as set forth in the following CITATION:

For conspicuous gallantry and intrepidity at the risk of his life above and beyond the call of duty while serving as a machine gunner with Company F, Second Battalion, Fourth Marines, Third Marine Division, in the Republic of Vietnam on 21 September 1967. During a reconnaissance operation near Con Thien, Corporal Barker's squad was suddenly hit by enemy sniper fire. The squad immediately deployed to a combat formation and advanced to a strongly fortified enemy position, when it was again struck by small arms and automatic weapons fire, sustaining numerous casualties. Although wounded by the initial burst of fire, Corporal Barker boldly remained in the open, delivering a devastating volume of accurate fire on the numerically superior force. The enemy was intent upon annihilating the small Marine force and, realizing that Corporal Barker was a threat to their position, directed the preponderance of their fire on his position. He was again wounded, this time in the right hand, which prevented him from operating his vitally needed machine gun. Suddenly, and without warning, an enemy grenade landed in the midst of the few surviving Marines. Unhesitatingly and with complete disregard for his own personal safety, Corporal Barker threw himself upon the deadly grenade, absorbing with his own body the full and tremendous force of the explosion. In a final act of bravery, he crawled to the side of a wounded comrade and administered first aid before succumbing to his grievous wounds. His bold initiative, intrepid fighting spirit, and unwavering devotion to duty in the face of almost certain death undoubtedly saved his comrades from further injury or possible death and reflected great credit upon himself, the Marine Corps, and the United States Naval Service. He gallantly gave his life for his country.

/S/RICHARD M. NIXON

== Awards and decorations ==

1st row	Medal of Honor		Purple Heart
2nd row	Navy Presidential Unit Citation	Combat Action Ribbon	Purple Heart
3rd row	Vietnam Service Medal with 1 Campaign star	RVN Gallantry Cross Unit Citation with Palm	Vietnam Campaign Medal

== In memory ==
Lance Corporal Jedh Colby Barker has his name engraved on the Vietnam Veterans Memorial on Panel 26E Line 099.

== See also ==
- List of Medal of Honor recipients
- List of Medal of Honor recipients for the Vietnam War
