= Firebase Gio Linh =

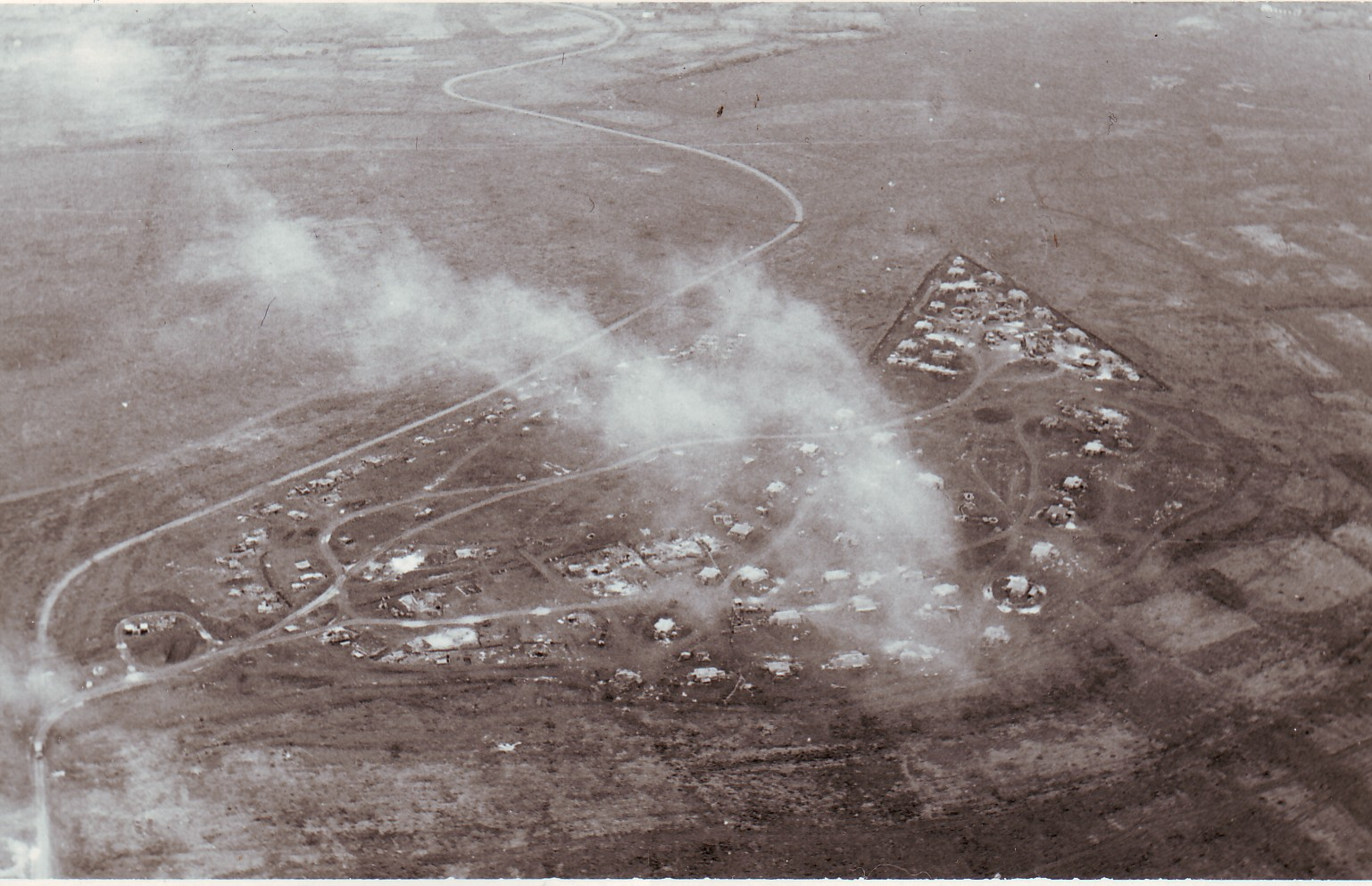
- Gio Linh, March 1968

Site information
- Type: Marines/Army

Location
- Coordinates: 16.943°N 107.076°E

Site history
- Built: 1966
- In use: 1966–1972
- Battles/wars: Vietnam War; Battle of Con Thien; Easter Offensive

Garrison information
- Occupants: 3rd Marine Division; ARVN 1st Division; ARVN 3rd Division

Firebase Gio Linh (also known as FSB A-2, Alpha 2, Camp Hill, The Alamo or simply Gio Linh) is a former U.S. Marine Corps, U.S. Army and Army of the Republic of Vietnam (ARVN) firebase north of Đông Hà in Quang Tri Province, central Vietnam.

== History ==
=== 1966-7 ===
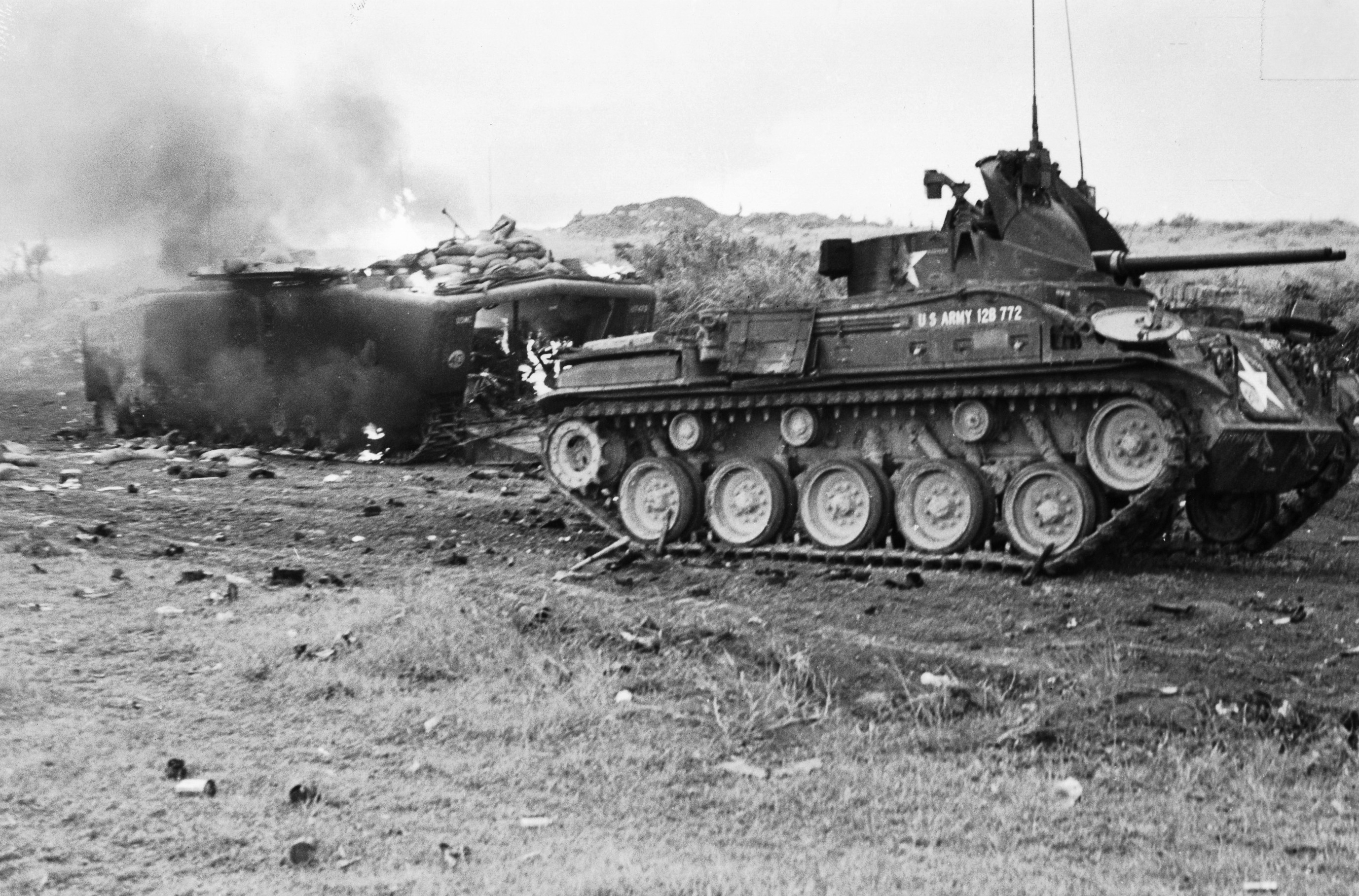
An LVT-5 hit by mortars at Firebase Gio Linh on the night of 9 May 1967 still burns the next morning

The base was established 13 km north of Đông Hà on Highway 1 immediately south of the Vietnamese Demilitarized Zone (DMZ).

On 19 May 1966, the People's Army of Vietnam (PAVN) attacked the ARVN base at Gio Linh killing 43 and wounding 54.

From 15 to 18 September 1966, the 1st Battalion, 26th Marines launched Operation Deckhouse IV and discovered that the PAVN had built a network of tunnels and bunkers in the Con Thien-Gio Linh area.

Gio Linh was intended to form part of the McNamara Line and formed one corner of what became known as Leatherneck Square, with the other corners being Con Thien, Cam Lộ Combat Base and Đông Hà Combat Base.

In February 1967 the 12th Marines had four 175 mm guns and sic 105 mm howitzers based at Gio Linh. On 27 February, the PAVN attacked Gio Linh with mortars, rocket and artillery fire. On 20 March the base was subjected to another rocket and artillery attack and on 21 March a supply convoy was ambushed just 300m from the base. The PAVN claimed to have killed over 1,000 enemy troops and destroyed 17 artillery pieces, 57 vehicles and three helicopters in the 20 March artillery barrage.

From 20 March to 1 April, Operation Beacon Hill saw BLT 1st Battalion, 4th Marines patrolling around the base to try to prevent further PAVN attacks. From 10 to 17 April, the 11th Engineer Battalion began clearing a 200m wide strip between Gio Linh and Con Thien, a distance of over 10 km the strip was eventually completed on 1 July and widened to 600m.

On 27/8 April Gio Linh was hit by over 800 artillery shells and 200 mortar rounds. On 8 May the PAVN launched an attack on Con Thien and shelled Gio Linh in an attempt to reduce its fire support for Con Thien. On 17/18 May PAVN artillery rockets and artillery hit Đông Hà and Gio Linh, killing 1 Marine and wounding 12 others at Gio Linh. By July engineers had completed clearing a 500m radius around the base and had started building underground bunkers. On 2 July, the first day of Operation Buffalo the base was again heavily shelled in an attempt to reduce fire support for the encircled 1st Battalion, 9th Marines.

=== 1968–9 ===
From late 1967 the ARVN 2nd Regiment of the 1st Division was based at Gio Linh together with Company M 3rd Battalion, 3rd Marines to provide security for the artillery. On 9 January a mortar attack on the base resulted in three marines killed and two wounded.

In September 1969 as part of Operation Keystone Cardinal the 3rd Marine Division began its withdrawal from Vietnam and by early October the Marines had handed over control of their tactical area of operations (including the Gio Linh base) to the 1st Brigade, 5th Infantry Division and the ARVN 1st Division.

=== 1970-2 ===
In 1970 the M55 Self Propelled Howitzer of the Marines 5th 175mm Gun Battery remained at Gio Linh under the command of the Army's 108th Artillery Group. A small number of Marines remained at Đông Hà as part of the ANGLICO unit supporting the ARVN 1st Division.

By January 1972 the ARVN 3rd Division had assumed responsibility for the area north of Highway 9.

The PAVN launched their Easter Offensive on 30 March 1972 and by midday on 1 April the ARVN garrison at Gio Linh had retreated from their perimeter positions to the base's bunkers, while the 5-man ANGLICO team continued to call in fire missions against the advancing PAVN. PAVN forces were probing the base perimeter when an Army Bell UH-1 Iroquois arrived to evacuate the ANGLICO team, just as the team was boarding the helicopter the landing zone was hit by mortar fire mortally wounding the team leader. Corporal James Worth of the ANGLICO team failed to board the helicopter and was listed as Missing in Action. By nightfall on 1 April, all ARVN defensive positions along the DMZ and north of the Cam Lo River had fallen to the PAVN. Gio Linh would remain in North Vietnamese hands for the rest of the war.

== Current use ==
The base has been turned over to farmland.
