= Lyle H. Miller =

U.S. Marine Corps Brigadier General

Lyle Holcombe Miller
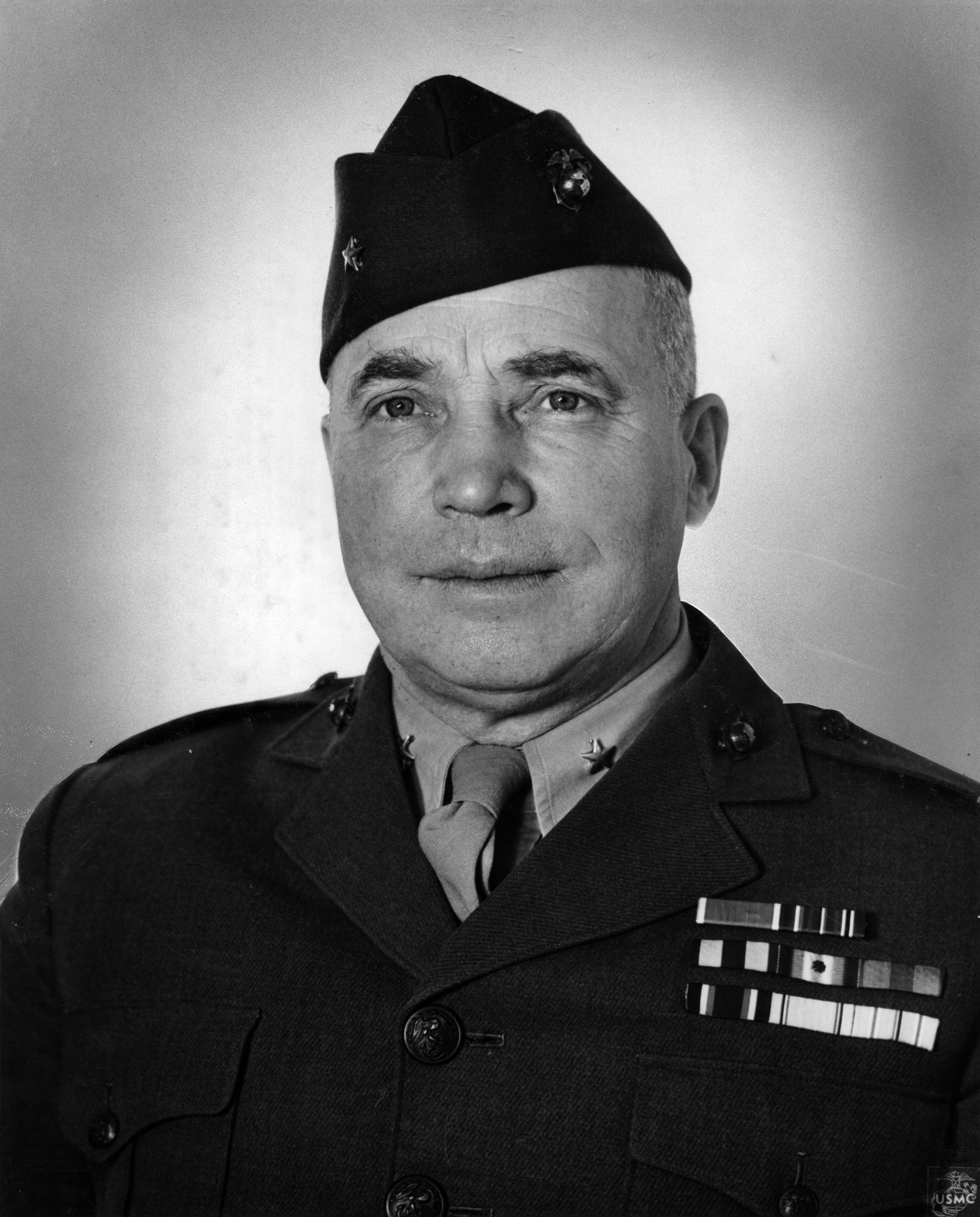
- BG Lyle H. Miller, USMC
- Born: March 10, 1889; Athens, Michigan, US
- Died: March 11, 1973 (aged 84); Pinellas County, Florida, US
- Burial place: Burr Oak Cemetery
- Military career
- Allegiance: United States of America
- Branch: United States Marine Corps
- Service years: 1914–1945
- Rank: Brigadier general
- Service number: 0-663
- Commands: Chief of Staff, Samoa Defense Force
- Conflicts: Veracruz Expedition; World War I Yangtze Patrol; World War II
- Awards: Legion of Merit

Lyle Holcombe Miller (March 10, 1889 – March 11, 1973) was an officer of the United States Marine Corps, who reached the rank of brigadier general. He is most noted for his service as chief of staff of Samoa Defense Force during World War II. He disgraced his good service record by incident with Dai Li, Chiang Kai-shek's Military Intelligence Service Chief, in late 1944.

== Early career ==
Lyle H. Miller was born on March 10, 1889, in Athens, Michigan. He attended the local high school and subsequently went to the Albion College, where he later graduated with Bachelor of Arts degree. Miller then worked as an instructor at Wentworth Military Academy in Lexington, Missouri, before was commissioned second lieutenant in the Marine Corps in August 1914. He was subsequently ordered to the instruction for 17 months at the Marine Officers' School, Norfolk, Virginia and took part in the Veracruz Expedition aboard the battleship USS Illinois within the course.

Upon the graduation, he served with the Marine Barracks at Port Royal, South Carolina, and later was attached to the Marine detachment aboard the battleship USS Arizona. Miller, who was meanwhile promoted to the rank of first lieutenant in September 1916, sailed with Arizona to Guantanamo Bay, Cuba, for expeditionary duty. He received the promotion to the rank of captain in October 1917 and was appointed commanding officer of Headquarters Company within 13th Marine Regiment under Colonel Smedley Butler. His regiment sailed within 5th Marine Brigade under Brigadier General Eli K. Cole to France in September 1918 and Miller was appointed to the temporary rank of major at the same time. But it was too late to see combat, and he spent the next year of service in Brest until August 1919, when he was ordered back to the United States.

Following his return stateside, Miller was reverted to the rank of captain and assigned to the Marine barracks at Quantico, Virginia. He was sent for the instruction at Army Infantry School at Fort Benning, Georgia and then to the Field Officers Course at Marine Corps Schools Quantico.

Miller returned to the battleship USS Arizona in June 1923 as commanding officer of the Marine detachment. He served aboard that ship until September 1925, when he was ordered ashore for recruiting duty in Seattle, Washington. However he left this assignment in August 1926, when he was attached to the course at Command and General Staff College at Fort Leavenworth, Kansas.

He graduated one year later and assumed duties as an instructor within Field Officers Course at Marine Corps Schools Quantico. During this assignment, Miller worked together with Charles D. Barrett and Pedro del Valle on the tentative Marine Corps Landing Operations Manual. While in this capacity, he was promoted to the rank of major in November 1928.

During December 1931, Miller was transferred to San Diego, California, and appointed Athletic Officer of 4th Marine Regiment. He sailed for China in June 1932 and assumed command of 2nd Battalion, 4th Marines in October 1932. Miller commanded his battalion during guard duties at Shanghai International Settlement until November 1934, when he was ordered back to the United States. Miller was meanwhile promoted to the rank of lieutenant colonel in October 1934.

Upon his arrival, he was assigned to the Marine Corps Base Quantico, Virginia, and appointed commanding officer of 1st Battalion, 5th Marines. Miller was subsequently ordered as an instructor to the Marine Barracks Parris Island, South Carolina, in April 1937 and served also as barracks temporary commanding officer at the beginning of July 1937, when Brigadier General James T. Buttrick received transfer orders.

== World War II ==
Miller was promoted to the rank of colonel in March 1939 and sent to the Senior Course at Naval War College at Newport, Rhode Island. He graduated during May 1940 and served as an instructor until May 1941, when he was assigned to the staff of 2nd Marine Division under Major General Clayton B. Vogel at San Diego. When general Vogel was appointed commanding general of Amphibious Force, Pacific Fleet, Miller followed him as his chief of staff in March 1942.

However, he left this command after one month and sailed for Samoan Islands, where he became chief of staff of Samoan Defense Force under Major General Charles F. B. Price. For his new assignment, Miller was promoted to the rank of brigadier general in September 1942. It was calm service in comparation with front-line in Guadalcanal at the time. But Miller distinguished himself and received the Legion of Merit for his service there.

=== Incident with Dai Li ===
General Miller left Samoa at the beginning of March 1944, when this command began its deactivation. As an experienced officer, he was ordered to Washington, D.C., for important duties with Office of Strategic Services under Major General William J. Donovan. Miller was appointed senior member of the OSS Planning Board and took part in a brief observation tour in Europe. In October 1944, the situation between Chiang Kai-shek and General Joseph Stilwell, commanding general of China Burma India Theater, became worse, and there was impending threat of Stillwell recall from China.

Donovan ordered Miller to China an arrived to Chungking on October 18, in order to discuss OSS reorganization matters with General Dai Li, Chiang Kai-shek's Military Intelligence Service Chief. Miller attended the conference, which occurred on October 22, 1944, and also was invited to the evening banquet hosted by Dai Li. After the dinner liquor was served, Miller spoke disrespectfully and offensively of Madame Chiang Kai-shek, her husband and Chinese people.

There were several statements made by General Miller during the night:

- Miller demanded that Dai Li afford us the opportunity of being entertained by Sing-song girls. He requested Dai Li that produce such maidens.
- Miller asked Dai Li about Chiang Kai-shek's new woman and wanted know if this was the reason for his wife's long absence.
- Miller denied that China is a front-rank power. He stated that the country could not even be a 5th- or 6th-rank power and that they were just about 12th.
- Miller stated that China was guilty of "God damn obstructionism".
- Miller asserted that China would now be under Japanese domination if it had not been for the United States of America guarantees that China is a front-rank power and also guarantees China's territorial integrity. According to Miller, 40–50 years will be required for China to assume a leading position.
- Miller also said in order to protect China from USSR, it is necessary for China to have US support.
- Miller repeatedly called Chinese "Chinamen".
- Miller said "You Chinamen must open your eyes and stop sleeping like that idiot over there" (Miller designated one of the Chinese guests as an example what he meant).
- Miller said that in the Philippines he would get Japanese genitalia and ask the Chinese to a dinner at which they would be served.

General Miller's tirade lasted for more than two hours, before he stopped. Another OSS officials, who witnessed the situation, sent a report to Major General William J. Donovan in Washington, D.C. Donovan was really angry about Miller's behavior and ordered him immediately back to the United States.

Upon his return, Donovan fired him from the OSS and gave him two choices. The court-martial for insubordination or resignation from the service at his own request and treatment in St. Elizabeths Mental Hospital. Miller realized that court-martial could totally destroy the rest of his career, so he chose mental hospital. He was later transferred to the United States Naval Hospital at Bethesda, Maryland, and, upon discharge in June 1945, Miller was relieved from active service.

Miller died on March 11, 1973, only one day after his 84th birthday. He is buried at Burr Oak Cemetery in Athens, Michigan, together with his wife, Margurite French Miller (1889–1988).

== Decorations ==
Here is the ribbon bar of Brigadier General Lyle H. Miller:

1st Row	Legion of Merit		Marine Corps Expeditionary Medal	
2nd Row	Mexican Service Medal	World War I Victory Medal with one battle clasp	Yangtze Service Medal	American Defense Service Medal
3rd Row	Asiatic-Pacific Campaign Medal	American Campaign Medal	European–African–Middle Eastern Campaign Medal	World War II Victory Medal
