= Paul H. Foster =

Paul Hellstrom Foster
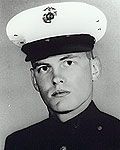
- Paul H. Foster, Medal of Honor recipient
- Born: April 17, 1939; San Mateo, California, U.S.
- Died: October 14, 1967 (aged 28); Con Thien, South Vietnam
- Burial place: Golden Gate National Cemetery, San Bruno, California
- Military career
- Allegiance: United States of America
- Branch: United States Marine Corps
- Service years: 1961–1967
- Rank: Sergeant
- Units: 2nd Battalion 4th Marines, 3rd Marine Division
- Conflicts: Vietnam War: Operation Kingfisher; Siege of Con Thien †
- Awards: Medal of Honor (1967); Purple Heart

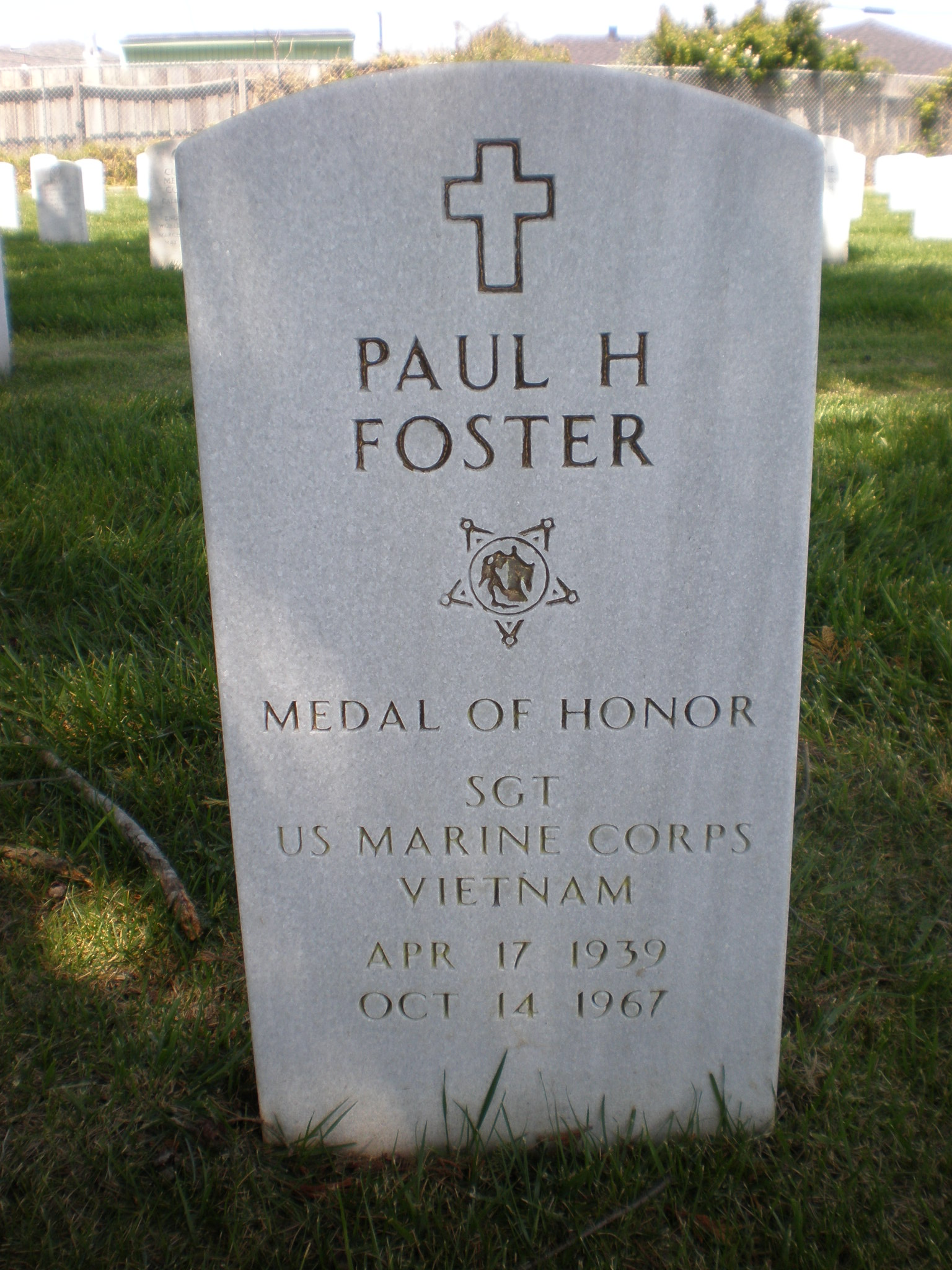
Foster's gravestone at Golden Gate National Cemetery

Paul Hellstrom Foster (April 17, 1939 – October 14, 1967) was a United States Marine who posthumously received the Medal of Honor for heroism in Vietnam in October 1967.

== Biography ==
Foster was born on April 17, 1939, in San Mateo, California. He attended elementary and high schools there and was a member of the varsity football and track teams. After graduating from high school in 1957, Foster went to work as an automobile mechanic helper.

Foster enlisted in the Marine Corps Reserve on November 4, 1961, in San Francisco, California, and received recruit training with the 1st Recruit Training Battalion at Marine Corps Recruit Depot San Diego, and individual combat training with the 2nd Infantry Training Regiment at Marine Corps Base Camp Pendleton.

After completion of combat training in March 1962, Foster joined the 5th 105 mm Howitzer Battery (later redesignated Headquarters Battery, 14th Marines, 4th Marine Division), a Reserve unit, at Navy and Marine Corps Training Center Treasure Island in San Francisco. While on inactive duty, Foster was promoted to private first class in March 1963, to Lance Corporal in August 1963; to Corporal in April 1964, and to Sergeant on February 1, 1966.

Called to active duty in November 1966, Sgt Foster embarked for the Republic of Vietnam, and in December, joined Company H, 3rd Battalion 12th Marines, 3rd Marine Division. While serving as an Artillery Liaison Operations Chief with the 2nd Battalion 4th Marines in Operation Kingfisher near Con Thien at Wash Out Bridge on October 14, 1967, Sgt Foster was mortally wounded when he threw himself upon a hand grenade to save the lives of his five comrades.

The Medal of Honor was presented to his family by President Richard M. Nixon, in a ceremony at the White House on June 20, 1969.

Sergeant Paul H. Foster is buried in Grave 4764, Section V, Golden Gate National Cemetery, San Bruno, California.

== Awards and honors ==
Foster's medals and decorations include:

	Medal of Honor	
Purple Heart	Navy Presidential Unit Citation	Organized Marine Corps Reserve Medal
National Defense Service Medal	Vietnam Service Medal w/ 1 service star	Vietnam Campaign Medal

=== Medal of Honor citation ===
The President of the United States in the name of The Congress takes pride in presenting the MEDAL OF HONOR posthumously to

SERGEANT PAUL H. FOSTER
UNITED STATES MARINE CORPS RESERVE

for service as set forth in the following CITATION:

For conspicuous gallantry and intrepidity at the risk of his life above and beyond the call of duty while serving as an Artillery Liaison Operations Chief with the Second Battalion, Fourth Marines, Third Marine Division, near Con Thien in the Republic of Vietnam. In the early morning hours of October 14, 1967, the Second Battalion was occupying a defensive position which protected a bridge on the road leading from Con Thien to Cam Lộ. Suddenly, the Marines' position came under a heavy volume of mortar and artillery fire, followed by an aggressive enemy ground assault. In the ensuing engagement, the hostile forces penetrated the perimeter and brought a heavy concentration of small arms, automatic weapons, and rocket fire to bear on the Battalion Command Post. Although his position in the Fire Support Coordination Center was dangerously exposed to enemy fire and he was wounded when an enemy hand grenade exploded near his position, Sergeant Foster resolutely continued to direct accurate mortar and artillery fire on the advancing North Vietnamese troops. As the attack continued, a hand grenade landed in the midst of Sergeant Foster and his five companions. Realizing the danger, he shouted a warning, threw his armored vest over the grenade, and unhesitatingly placed his own body over the armored vest. When the grenade exploded, Sergeant Foster absorbed the entire blast with his own body and was mortally wounded. His heroic actions undoubtedly saved his comrades from further injury or possible death. Sergeant Foster's courage, extraordinary heroism, and unfaltering devotion to duty reflected great credit upon himself and the Marine Corps and upheld the highest traditions of the United States Naval Service. He gallantly gave his life for his country.

/S/ RICHARD NIXON

== See also ==
- List of Medal of Honor recipients for the Vietnam War
