= USS Paul =

Frigate of the US Navy

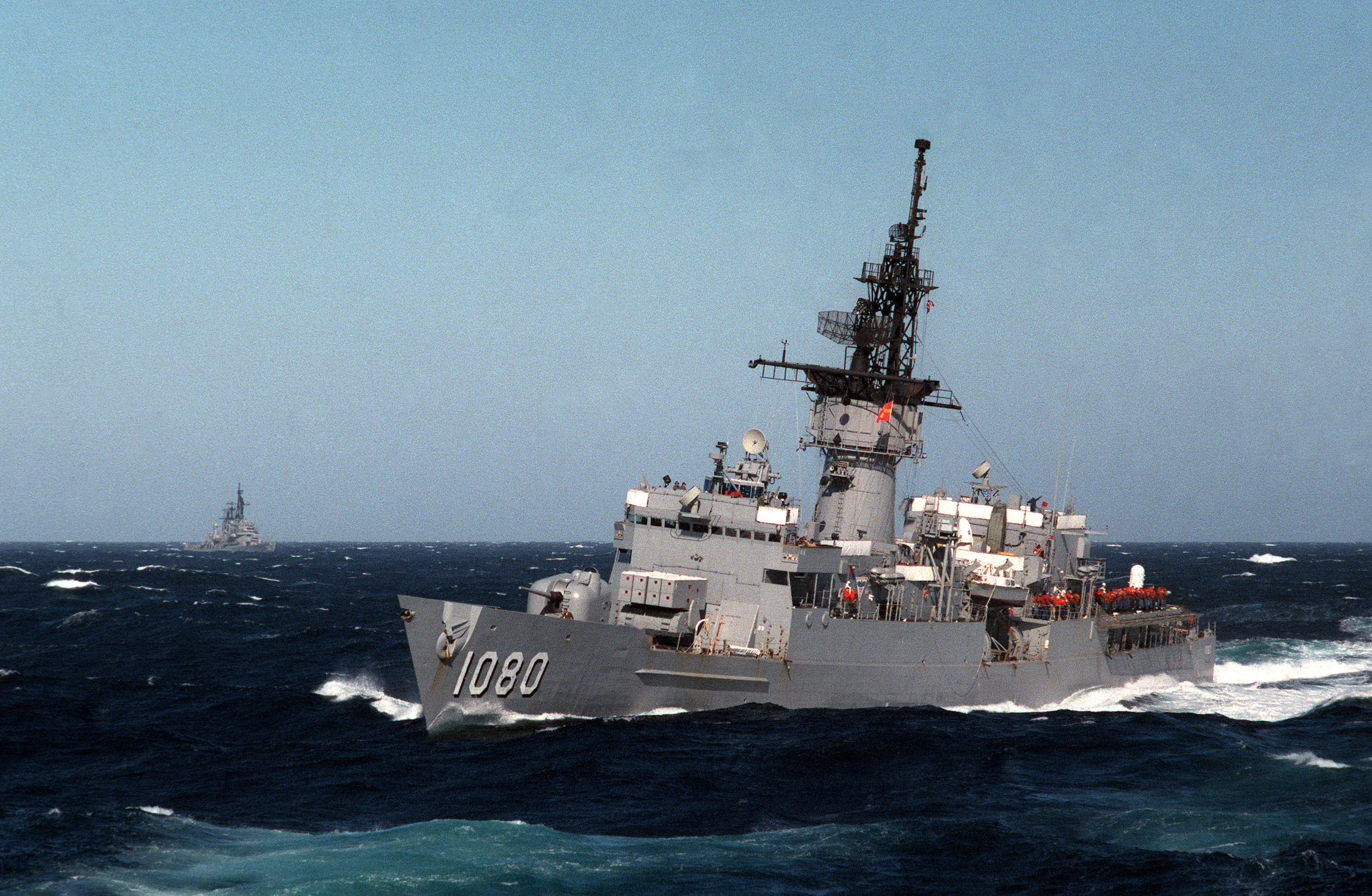
- USS Paul (FF-1080)

History

United States
- Name: Paul
- Namesake: Medal of Honor winner Marine Lance Corporal Joe C. Paul, killed in Vietnam.
- Ordered: 25 August 1966
- Builder: Avondale Shipyard, Westwego, Louisiana
- Laid down: 12 September 1969
- Launched: 20 June 1970
- Acquired: 23 July 1971
- Commissioned: 14 August 1971
- Decommissioned: 14 August 1992
- Stricken: 11 January 1995
- Motto: Power, Pride
- Fate: Transferred to Turkey as Grant Aid parts hulk, 9 January 2000; Scrapped 2002

General characteristics
- Class & type: Knox-class frigate
- Displacement: 3,216 tons (4,197 full load)
- Length: 438 ft (134 m)
- Beam: 46 ft 9 in (14.25 m)
- Draught: 24 ft 9 in (7.54 m)
- Propulsion: 2 × CE 1200psi boilers; 1 Westinghouse geared turbine; 1 shaft, 35,000 SHP (26 MW)
- Speed: over 27 knots
- Complement: 18 officers, 267 enlisted
- Sensors & processing systems: AN/SPS-40 Air Search Radar; AN/SPS-67 Surface Search Radar; AN/SQS-26 Sonar; AN/SQS-35 Variable Depth Sonar; AN/SQR-18 Towed array sonar system; Mk68 Gun Fire Control System
- Electronic warfare & decoys: AN/SLQ-32 Electronics Warfare System
- Armament: one Mk-16 8 cell missile launcher for RUR-5 ASROC and Harpoon missiles; one Mk-42 5-inch/54 caliber gun; Mark 46 torpedoes from four single tube launchers); one Mk-25 BPDMS launcher for Sea Sparrow missiles (later replaced with one 20 mm Phalanx CIWS)
- Aircraft carried: one SH-2 Seasprite (LAMPS I) helicopter

USS Paul (FF-1080) was a Knox-class frigate built for the United States Navy by Avondale Shipyard, Westwego, Louisiana.

== Design and description ==
The Knox class design was derived from the Brooke-class frigate modified to extend range and without a long-range missile system. The ships had an overall length of 438 feet (133.5 m), a beam of 47 feet (14.3 m) and a draft of 25 feet (7.6 m). They displaced 4,066 long tons (4,131 t) at full load. Their crew consisted of 13 officers and 211 enlisted men.

The ships were equipped with one Westinghouse geared steam turbine that drove the single propeller shaft. The turbine was designed to produce 35,000 shaft horsepower (26,000 kW), using steam provided by 2 C-E boilers, to reach the designed speed of 27 knots (50 km/h; 31 mph). The Knox class had a range of 4,500 nautical miles (8,300 km; 5,200 mi) at a speed of 20 knots (37 km/h; 23 mph).

The Knox-class ships were armed with a 5"/54 caliber Mark 42 gun forward and a single 3-inch/50-caliber gun aft. They mounted an eight-round RUR-5 ASROC launcher between the 5-inch (127 mm) gun and the bridge. Close-range anti-submarine defense was provided by two twin 12.75-inch (324 mm) Mk 32 torpedo tubes. The ships were equipped with a torpedo-carrying DASH drone helicopter; its telescoping hangar and landing pad were positioned amidships aft of the mack. Beginning in the 1970s, the DASH was replaced by a SH-2 Seasprite LAMPS I helicopter and the hangar and landing deck were accordingly enlarged. Most ships also had the 3-inch (76 mm) gun replaced by an eight-cell BPDMS missile launcher in the early 1970s.

== Construction and career ==
Paul was laid down 12 September 1969, launched 20 June 1970, and delivered 23 July 1971. She was commissioned 14 August 1971, decommissioned 14 August 1992, and struck 11 January 1995. Paul was disposed of through the Security Assistance Program (SAP), transferred, grant aid, ex-US fleet hull, to Turkey on 9 January 2000.
