= Howard V. Lee =

US Marine Corps officer (1933–2019)

Howard Vincent Lee
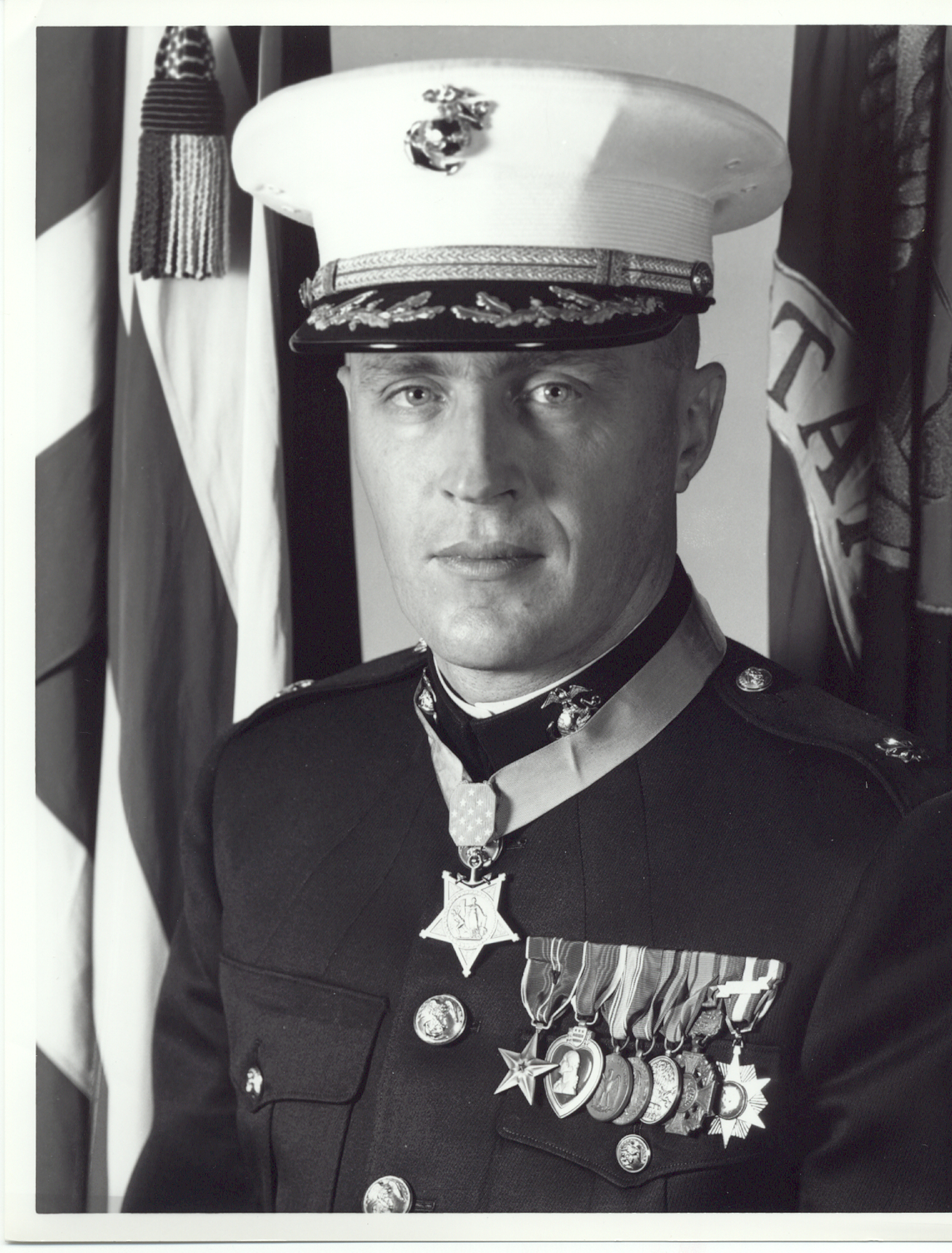
- Howard V. Lee, Medal of Honor recipient
- Born: August 1, 1933; New York City, New York, U.S.
- Died: March 23, 2019 (aged 85); Virginia Beach, Virginia, U.S.
- Burial place: Colonial Grove Memorial Park, Virginia Beach, Virginia
- Military career
- Allegiance: United States
- Branch: United States Marine Corps
- Service years: 1955-1975
- Rank: Lieutenant Colonel
- Unit: 2nd Battalion 4th Marines
- Conflicts: Vietnam War
- Awards: Medal of Honor; Bronze Star with valor device(2); Purple Heart

Lieutenant Colonel Howard Vincent Lee (August 1, 1933 – March 23, 2019) was a United States Marine Corps officer who received the Medal of Honor for heroism in August 1966 during the Vietnam War.

== Biography ==
Howard Lee was born on August 1, 1933, in New York City. He graduated from DeWitt Clinton High School in the Bronx, New York in 1951, and from Pace College with a Bachelor's degree in Business Administration, on June 19, 1955. While in his senior year at college, he enlisted as a member of the Platoon Leaders Class in the U.S. Marine Corps Reserve.

In September 1955, he entered the 14th Officer Candidates' Course, Marine Corps Schools, Quantico, Virginia, and upon completing the course the following December, was commissioned a Marine Corps Reserve second lieutenant. Lieutenant Lee completed The Basic School, Marine Corps Schools, Quantico, in July 1956 and the Marine Corps Supply School, Marine Corps Base, Camp Lejeune, North Carolina, that September.

Upon completion of these courses, he was transferred to the Marine Corps Supply Activity, Philadelphia, Pennsylvania, for duty as Field Inspection Officer, Field Inspection Section, and later, Officer in Charge, Audit Section. He was promoted to first lieutenant in June 1957, and integrated into the Regular Marine Corps in January 1958.

Detached from the Supply Activity in September 1958, he was ordered to the West Coast, and served briefly as Troop Handler, 1st Replacement Battalion, Staging Regiment, Marine Corps Base, Camp Pendleton, California, then was assigned duty as a platoon commander with Company F, 2nd Battalion 9th Marines, 3rd Marine Division, serving in this capacity until June 1959.

First Lieutenant Lee next served as the Battalion S-4 Officer with H&S Company, 3rd Battalion, 3rd Marines, 3rd Marine Division, San Francisco, California. In February 1960, he was assigned duty as Guard Officer at the Marine Barracks, U.S. Naval Propellant Plant, Indian Head, Maryland.

After his promotion to captain on July 1, 1961, he was assigned duties as Platoon Commander and, later, Instructor, The Basic School, Marine Corps Schools in Quantico, where he remained until June 1964.

From July 1964 until February 1966, Capt Lee was stationed at Camp Lejeune, North Carolina, serving first as Commanding Officer of Company A, 1st Battalion, then as Battalion S-3 Officer with H&S Company, 1st Battalion, 2nd Marines, 2nd Marine Division. During the latter period, he served aboard the USS La Salle (LPD-3), and in the Dominican Republic.

Vietnam War — 1st tour
Ordered to the Republic of Vietnam in April 1966, Capt Lee served as Commanding Officer of Company E, 2nd Battalion, 4th Marines, 3rd Marine Division. He received the Bronze Star with Combat "V" for heroic action on June 26, 1966 – June 27, 1966. Then, on August 8–9, 1966, he distinguished himself above and beyond the call of duty in the vicinity of Quang Tri, for which he received the Medal of Honor. Wounded in that action, Capt Lee was evacuated to the U.S. Naval Hospital, Bethesda, Maryland. In November 1966, he returned to duty at Headquarters Marine Corps and assigned duty as TO/MOS Coordinator and, later, Assistant FMF Readiness Officer in the Operation Section, G-4 Division. He was promoted to major in July 1966.

On October 25, 1967, Major Lee was presented the Medal of Honor by President Lyndon Johnson in a ceremony at the White House.

Vietnam War — 2nd tour
Following this assignment, Maj Lee completed the Command and Staff College, Quantico, Virginia, in June 1970, then returned to the Republic of Vietnam for his second tour of duty. For his service as Executive Officer, Provisional Headquarters and Service Company and with the 2nd Combined Action Group, III Marine Amphibious Force, he earned a Gold Star in lieu of a second Bronze Star Medal with Combat "V".

He was promoted in July 1972 to lieutenant colonel and retired in 1975 from the Marine Corps.

Lee died on March 23, 2019, aged 85.

== Awards and honors ==
Lee's awards include:

	Medal of Honor	Bronze Star w/ 1 award star & valor device	
Purple Heart	Combat Action Ribbon	Navy Presidential Unit Citation	National Defense Service Medal
Armed Forces Expeditionary Medal	Vietnam Service Medal w/ 2 service stars	Vietnam Gallantry Cross w/ 1 silver & 1 bronze star	Vietnam Campaign Medal

=== Medal of Honor citation ===
The President of the United States in the name of The Congress takes pride in presenting the MEDAL OF HONOR to

MAJOR HOWARD V. LEE
UNITED STATES MARINE CORPS

for service as set forth in the following CITATION:

For conspicuous gallantry and intrepidity at the risk of his life above and beyond the call of duty as Commanding Officer, Company E, Fourth Marines, Third Marine Division near Cam Lộ, Republic of Vietnam, on 8 and 9 August 1966. A platoon of Major (then Captain) Lee's company, while on an operation deep in enemy territory, was attacked and surrounded by a large Vietnamese force. Realizing that the unit had suffered numerous casualties, depriving it of effective leadership, and fully aware that the platoon was even then under heavy attack by the enemy, Major Lee took seven men and proceeded by helicopter to reinforce the beleaguered platoon. Major Lee disembarked from the helicopter with two of his men and, braving withering enemy fire, led them into the perimeter, where he fearlessly moved from position to position, directing and encouraging the overtaxed troops. The enemy then launched a massive attack with the full might of their forces. Although painfully wounded by fragments from an enemy grenade in several areas of his body, including his eye, Major Lee continued undauntedly throughout the night to direct the valiant defense, coordinate supporting fires, and apprise higher headquarters of the plight of the platoon. The next morning he collapsed from his wounds and was forced to relinquish command. However, the small band of Marines had held their position and repeatedly fought off many vicious enemy attacks for a grueling six hours until their evacuation was effected the following morning. Major Lee's actions saved his men from capture, minimized the loss of lives, and dealt the enemy a severe defeat. His indomitable fighting spirit, superb leadership, and great personal valor in the face of tremendous odds, reflect great credit upon himself and are in keeping with the highest traditions of the Marine Corps and the United States Naval Service.

/S/ LYNDON B. JOHNSON

== See also ==
- List of Medal of Honor recipients
- List of Medal of Honor recipients for the Vietnam War
