= Operation Kingfisher =

Part of the Vietnam War (1967)

- Part of the Vietnam War
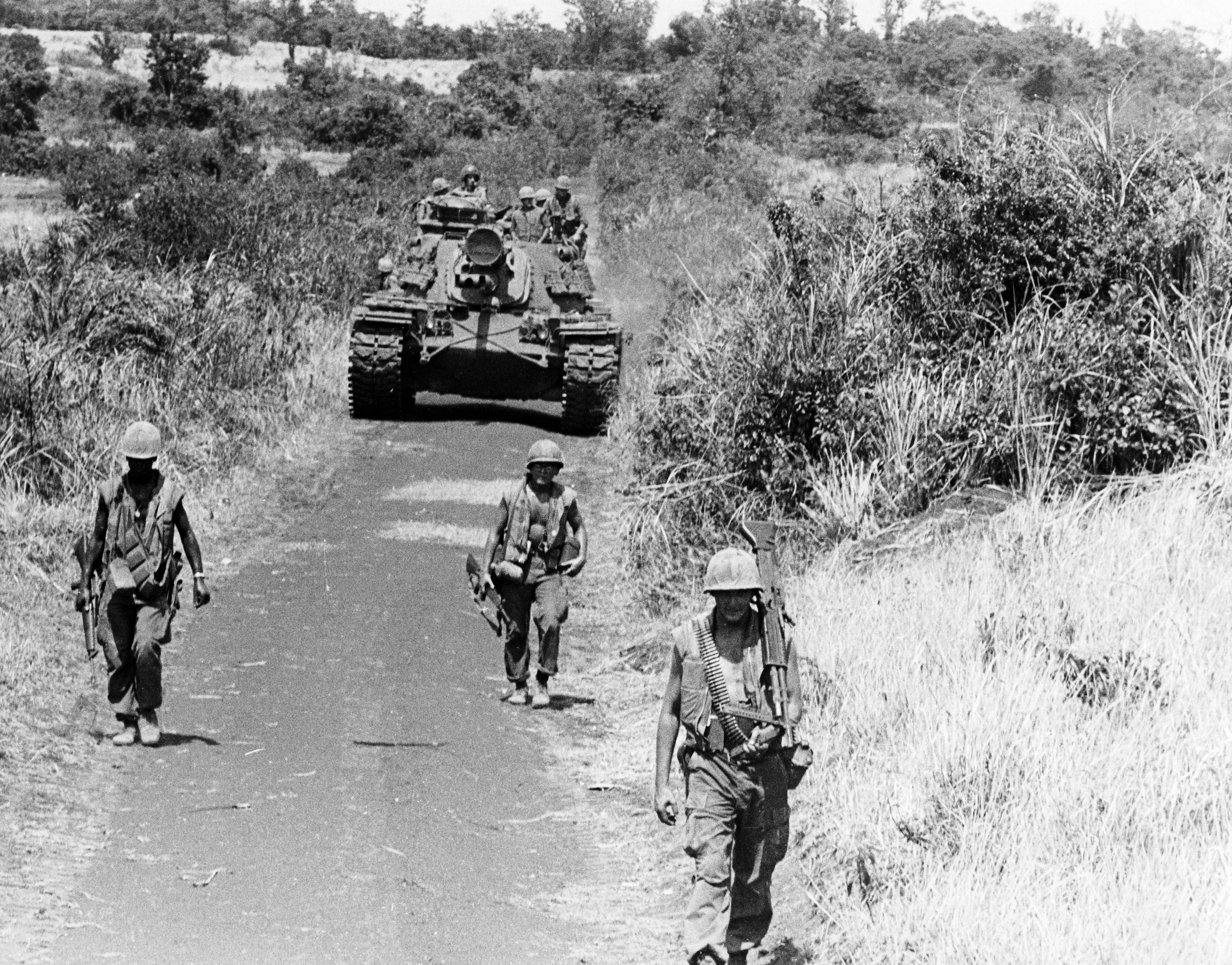
- 3/4 Marines patrol with a 3rd Tank Battalion M48, 29 July 1967
Date	16 July – 31 October 1967
Location	Quảng Trị Province, South Vietnam
Result	Both sides claim victory

Belligerents
United States	North Vietnam

Commanders and leaders
Robert E. Cushman, Jr. Col. George E. Jerue (until 13 September); Col. Richard B. Smith	

Units involved
3rd Battalion, 3rd Marines; 2nd Battalion, 4th Marines; 3rd Battalion, 4th Marines; 2nd Battalion, 9th Marines; 3rd Battalion, 9th Marines; 3rd Battalion 26th Marines	324B Division

Strength
~4,000–5,000	~8,000–10,000

Casualties and losses
340 killed	US body count: 1,117 killed 5 captured 1,942 estimated killed 155 weapons recovered

Operation Kingfisher was a U.S. Marine Corps operation that took place during the Vietnam War. The operation was carried out in the western part of "Leatherneck Square" near Con Thien, lasting from 16 July to 31 October 1967.

== Prelude ==
Following the conclusion of Operation Buffalo and Operation Hickory II, III Marine Amphibious Force (III MAF) launched Operation Kingfisher in the same general area with the same objective of blocking the entry of People's Army of Vietnam (PAVN) forces into eastern Quảng Trị Province.

== Battle ==
=== 16–27 July ===
This period saw only minor contact with the PAVN.

=== 28–30 July ===
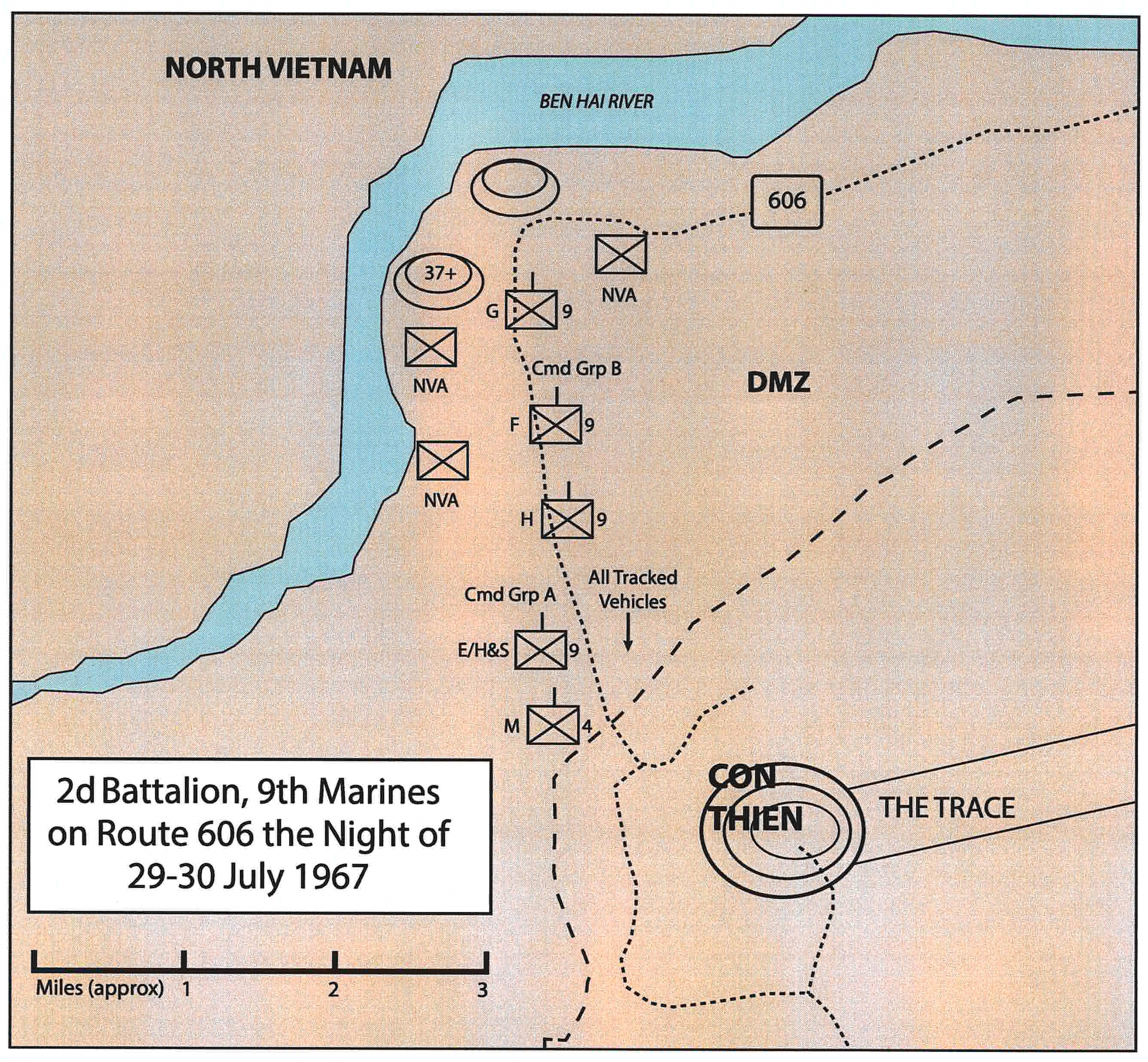
Map of the actions of 28–30 July

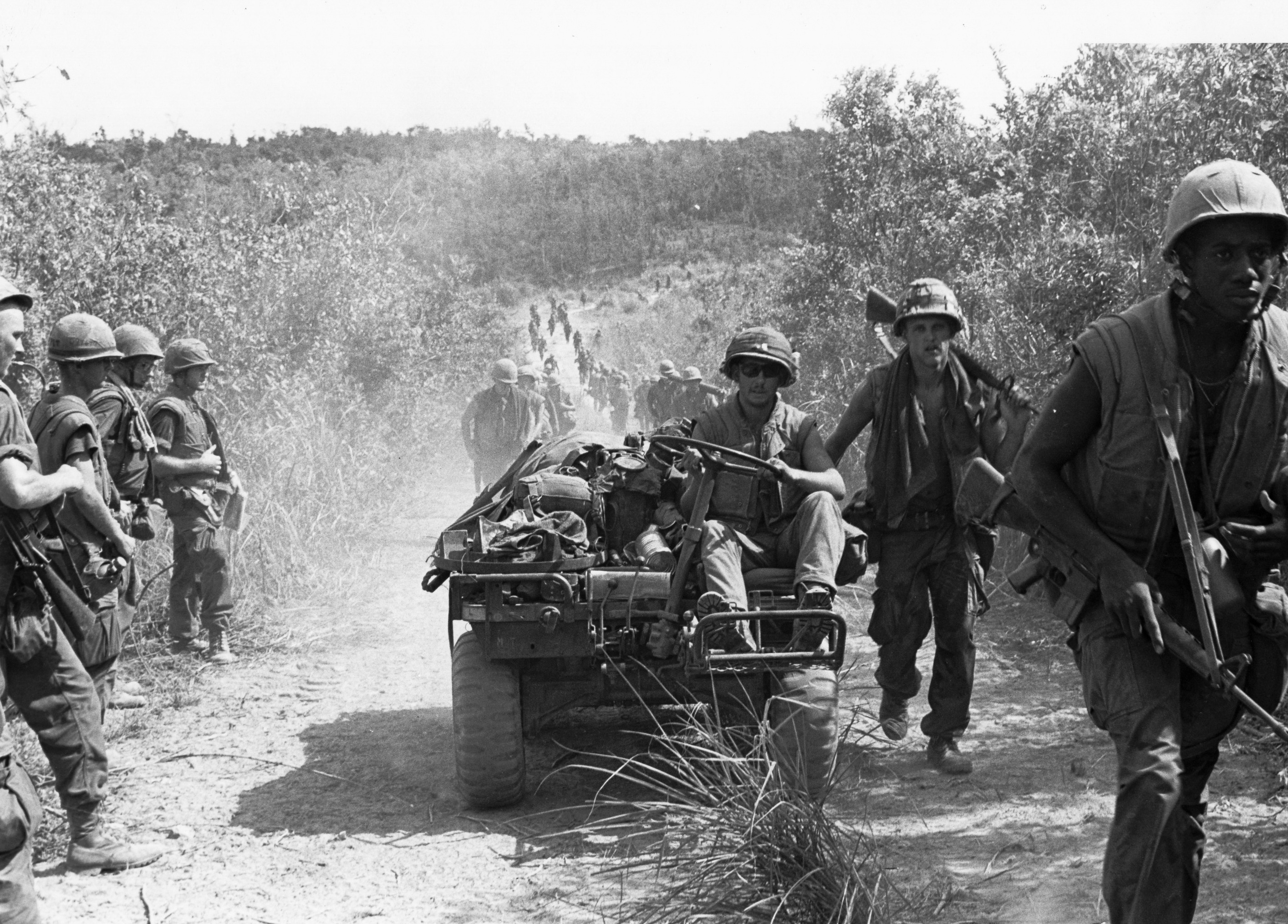
2/9 Marines return through the lines of the 3/4 Marines on 29 July

2/9 Marines, supported by a platoon of five M-48s, three M50 Ontos and three LVTEs moved north along Provincial Route 606 to make a spoiling attack into the DMZ, the unit made no contact with the PAVN and set up a night defensive position near the Bến Hải River The following morning as the unit was returning along the same route a command detonated mine exploded wounding 5 Marines. Further down the convoy, a second mine was detonated. The PAVN then opened fire with small arms and mortar fire and attacked the armored vehicles with RPG-2 rockets. The PAVN attempted to hug the US column negating the use of air support and the column broke up into several separate firefights. The convoy then retreated; only through the use of napalm support was the Marine convoy saved from a complete rout. The isolated Marine companies set up night defensive positions and were eventually relieved by 3/4 Marines on the morning of 30 July. Marine casualties for the operation were 23 dead and 251 wounded, while 32 PAVN dead were counted by the Marines and a further 175 believed killed.

=== 4–14 September ===
On the morning of 4 September, 3/4 Marines engaged a PAVN force 1.5 km south of Con Thien, trapping the PAVN force between two Companies of Marines. The Marines claimed that the PAVN lost 38 killed and 1 captured, while the Marines lost 6 dead and 47 wounded.

On 7 September 3/26 Marines supported by M-48s encountered a PAVN force 4.8 km south of Con Thien. The PAVN were alleged to have lost 51 killed, while the Marines lost 14 killed.

On the evening of 10 September 3/26 Marines engaged the PAVN 812th Regiment 6 km southwest of Con Thien. Some of the attacking PAVN were alleged to have been wearing USMC helmets and flak jackets and they were well supported mortars and 140mm rockets. An RPG destroyed an M67 flame thrower tank, but the PAVN were unable to penetrate Marines lines and US artillery boxed in the Marines forcing the PAVN to withdraw by 20:30. The following morning the Marines had claimed that 140 PAVN bodies were found around the Marine lines, the Marines had lost 34 dead and 192 wounded.

On the morning of 13 September, a PAVN Company attacked the northeastern sector of the Con Thien base, but they failed to penetrate the base and were forced back by Marine small arms and artillery fire.

=== 21 September ===
On 21 September Companies E, F & G, 2/4 Marines conducted a large sweep east of Con Thien just below the Trace. As the units advanced through the hedgerows the companies came under sniper, mortar and then heavy artillery fire. The company had later walked right into a pin-wheel ambush. The close-quarters fighting continued all day, ending at nightfall. The Marines had lost 16 killed and 118 wounded, while claiming the PAVN were estimated to have lost 39 killed. At the end of the battle the Marines left 15 of their dead on the battlefield, on 10 October 2/4 Marines went back in to retrieve their dead. LCPL Jedh Colby Barker would be posthumously awarded the Medal of Honor for his actions in this battle. The Marines were unable to retrieve bodies from the site for three weeks.

=== 14 October ===
At 01:25 on 14 October PAVN artillery hit 2nd Battalion 4th Marines position around Washout Bridge between the Charlie 2 (C-2) strongpoint and the Con Thien Combat Base. A night LP reported that a large PAVN unit (2 companies) was moving past its position towards the bridge. Marine snipers using Starlight Scopes saw the PAVN massing in front of Company H's position for an attack. The Marines tanks opened fire first with beehive rounds; machine guns causing the PAVN to attack prematurely. The PAVN failed to penetrate the companies wire and withdrew.

At 02:30 the PAVN attacked Company G, by destroying 2 machine gun position with RPGs. The PAVN penetrated the wire and overran the Company command post (CP) killing the Company commander Capt. Jack W. Phillips, his forward observer and 3 Platoon leaders; these young 2nd lieutenants just arrived in country. Capt. James W McCarter was ordered to take over command of Company, but he was killed by PAVN fire before he could reach the Command Post. Company F was ordered to support Company G and sweep through the area and drive the PAVN out. The Marines were supported by AC-47 Spooky gunships. Finally the PAVN was forced to withdraw by 04:30. The Marines had lost 21 dead and 23 wounded. SGT Paul H. Foster was posthumously awarded the Medal of Honor for his actions in the battle. The PAVN were alleged to have lost 24 killed.

=== 25–27 October ===
On 25 October 2/4 Marines began a sweep north along Route 561, there was no enemy contact but progress was slowed by heavy undergrowth and the unit set up a night position. That night PAVN rockets hit the 2/4 position killing the Executive Officer, Major John Lawendowski and wounding the commanding officer Lt.Col. James Hammond and two others of the command group who were evacuated by helicopter. The regimental operations officer Lt Col. John C. Studt was flown in to take over command of 2/4 Marines.

On 26 October, 2/4 Marines, less Company F which remained at the night position to guard a stock of ammunition, moved north and secured the objective by 13:00. The Battalion then came under PAVN mortar and small arms fire. A UH-34D helicopter of HMM-363 was shot down as it attempted pick up casualties, killing the pilot and door gunner, another UH-34 attempted to land but was damaged and made a forced landing at the C-2 Strongpoint. Lt Col Studt called for reinforcements and Company F moved north to the Battalion position, while two Companies from 3/3 Marines moved north from the C-2 Strongpoint arriving at the 2/4 position at dusk. The PAVN probed the Marine position with direct and indirect fire and ground attacks before withdrawing around 02:00 on 27 October. The following morning the Marines claimed 19 PAVN dead but were unable to police the area due to PAVN mortar and artillery fire. The Marines had lost 8 dead and 45 wounded in the period from 25 to 27 October.

== Aftermath ==
Operation Kingfisher concluded on 31 October. Marine casualties were 340 dead and 1,461 wounded. According to US reports, the PAVN sustained 1,117 killed and 5 captured, and a further 1,942 claimed to have been killed by U.S. forces and 155 weapons were captured. Tactical victories were claimed by both sides. Operation Kingfisher was followed immediately by Operation Kentucky.
