= Operation Jay =

Part of the Vietnam War (1966)

- Part of the Vietnam War
Date	25 June – 2 July 1966
Location	Thừa Thiên Province, South Vietnam
Result	U.S. claims operational success

Belligerents
United States; South Vietnam	North Vietnam

Commanders and leaders
(United States) Col. Donald W. Sherman	

Units involved
(United States) 2nd Battalion, 4th Marines (United States) 2nd Battalion, 1st Marines (United States) 3rd Battalion, 4th Marines (South Vietnam) 2nd Battalion, Vietnamese Marines	802nd Battalion; 806th Battalion; 812th Battalion

Casualties and losses
(United States) 24 killed (South Vietnam) 42 killed	475 killed

Operation Jay was a U.S. Marine Corps and Army of the Republic of Vietnam (ARVN) search and destroy operation on the Street Without Joy, northern Thừa Thiên Province, lasting from 25 June to 2 July 1966.

== Background ==
In early June, ARVN intelligence sources indicated that the 806th and 812th Regiments of the People's Army of Vietnam (PAVN) 6th Division were operating in the Quảng Điền District of Thừa Thiên Province. On 23 June an ARVN unit operating in Quảng Điền was mauled by a large PAVN unit. 4th Marine Regiment commander Col. Donald W. Sherman developed a combined operation with the ARVN 1st Division that called for the 2nd Battalion, 4th Marines to be landed on the O Lau River, while the 2nd Battalion, 1st Marines were landed 6 km southeast to establish blocking positions, the 4th Marines command group and 3rd Battalion, 12th Marines would occupy blocking positions near Phong Điền to the southwest, while the ARVN 1st Division (in Operation Lam Son 284) would occupy blocking positions to the northeast across the mouth of the O Lau River. Once the units were in place, the 2/4 Marines would advance southeast along Route 597 towards the 2/1 Marines.

== Operation ==
At 08:00 on 25 June CH-46s of Marine Aircraft Group 16 began landing the 2/4 Marines unopposed at Landing Zone Raven (16.667°N 107.367°E) and by 09:45 the entire battalion had been landed. At 10:15 2/4 Marines began their advance southeast along Route 597 with Company F on the north side of the road and Company H on the south side. After advancing 2 km to their first phase line the 2/4 Marines began to receive fire from the hamlet of Ap Chinh An (16.654°N 107.401°E), where the Marines had previously encountered enemy forces during Operation Oregon. Company H was ordered to make a flanking attack on the hamlet while air and artillery support was called in. At 11:00 2/1 Marines was landed at Landing Zone Shrike (16.6357°N 107.425°E) 9 km southeast of Landing Zone Raven and they moved 3.5 km northwest to establish their blocking positions. At 14:20 2/1 Marines were ordered a further 1.5 km northwest to support the 2/4 Marines. As the 2/1 Marines advanced astride Route 597 they received heavy fire from the hamlet of Mỹ Phú. The fighting at Ap Chinh An and Mỹ Phú continued into the night as the well-entrenched PAVN used heavy weapons to hold back the two Marine battalions. At 21:00 the PAVN counterattacked Company H, 2/4 Marines south of Ap Chinh An, but this was repulsed. A steady barrage of airstrikes, artillery and naval gunfire support was directed against the two hamlets throughout the night.

During the night of 25/6 June a PAVN force attacked the ARVN positions in the northeast but the attack was broken up by U.S. artillery. North of Phong Điền an attack on a South Vietnamese Popular Force unit was repulsed with the assistance of Company I, 3rd Battalion, 4th Marines killing eight Viet Cong (VC).

On the morning of 26 June the 2/4 Marines and 2/1 Marines reinforced by Company L, 3/4 Marines renewed their attack on Ap Chinh An and Mỹ Phú, however only a few rearguard troops remained in the hamlets as the main body had withdrawn during the night. By dusk the Marines had gained control of both hamlets and they spent the next two days methodically clearing the hamlets and the surrounding areas. Marine losses to date were 23 dead, while the bodies of 82 PAVN had been recovered and a further 200 were estimated to have been killed. On 29 June the operation was reduced to a one battalion operation, with 2/4 Marines taking over responsibility for the entire operational area and the other units being redeployed.

At 08:30 on 29 June the VC 802nd Battalion ambushed a 28 vehicle 2nd Battalion, Vietnamese Marines convoy on Route 1 northwest of Phong Điền, hitting 10 trucks. The Marines dismounted and moved east to the shelter of a railway berm, but the VC also occupied positions east of Route 1 and unleashed heavy fire on the Marines, wiping out their command group. The Marines were split into two perimeters and called for support and within minutes air and artillery strikes began hitting the VC ambush positions forcing the VC to withdraw. To the east of the railway line the VC were able to withdraw into thick forest, but to the west of Route 1 they had to withdraw across open ground where they were exposed to Allied fire. Companies I and L, 3/4 Marines and ARVN 1st Division units converged on the ambush site killing 185 VC and capturing nine. The Vietnamese Marines had lost 42 dead in the initial ambush.

== Aftermath ==
Operation Jay concluded on 2 July, the Marines had lost 24 killed, the South Vietnamese Marines had lost 42 killed and the Marine Corps claimed that the VC had lost 475 killed.
