= Joe Paul (footballer) =

Australian rules footballer, born 1904

Personal information
- Full name: Joe Paul
- Born: 2 February 1904
- Died: 8 February 1962 (aged 58)
- Height: 175 cm (5 ft 9 in)
- Weight: 77 kg (170 lb)

Playing career^{1}
Years	Club	Games (Goals)
1926, 1930	North Melbourne	14 (5)
- ^{1} Playing statistics correct to the end of 1930.

Joe Paul (2 February 1904 – 8 February 1962) was an Australian rules footballer who played with North Melbourne in the Victorian Football League (VFL).
