= Joe C. Paul =

United States Medal of Honor recipient

Joe Calvin Paul
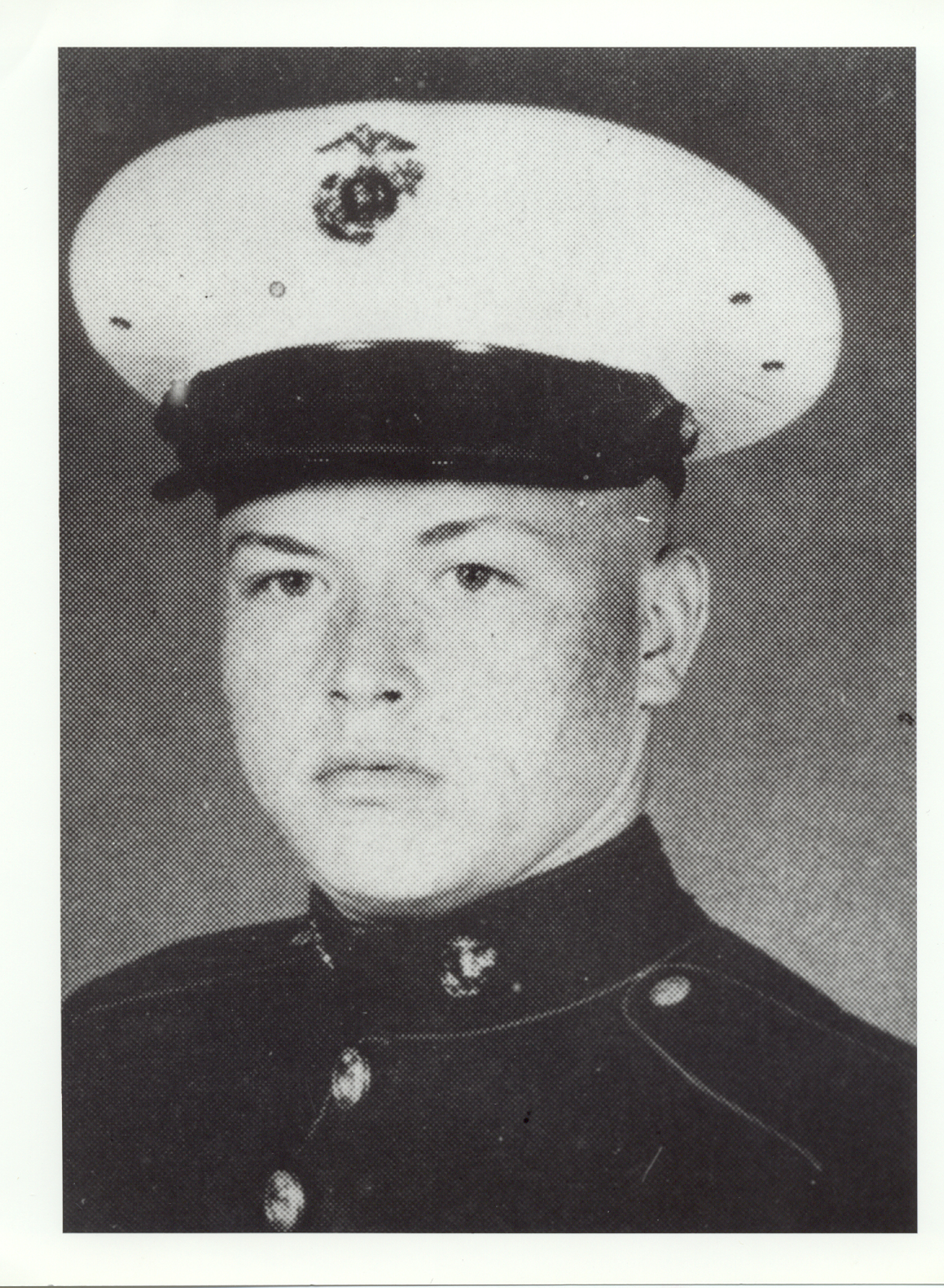
- Joe C. Paul, posthumous Medal of Honor recipient
- Born: April 23, 1946; Williamsburg, Kentucky, US
- Died: August 19, 1965 (aged 19); Chu Lai, Quang Nam Province, South Vietnam
- Burial place: Dayton Memorial Park Cemetery, Dayton, Ohio
- Military career
- Allegiance: United States
- Branch: United States Marine Corps
- Service years: 1963–1965
- Rank: Lance Corporal
- Units: Company H, 2nd Battalion, 4th Marines, 3rd Marine Division
- Conflicts: Vietnam War: Operation Starlite †
- Awards: Medal of Honor; Purple Heart

Lance Corporal Joe Calvin Paul (April 23, 1946 – August 19, 1965) was a United States Marine killed in the Vietnam War who posthumously received the Medal of Honor for diverting an attack long enough to allow the evacuation of wounded Marines during Operation Starlite near Chu Lai, Vietnam, on August 18, 1965. The medal was awarded on February 7, 1967, during a ceremony in the Office of Secretary of the Navy Paul H. Nitze, who presented the award to his parents.

== Biography ==
Joe Calvin Paul was born on April 23, 1946, in Williamsburg, Kentucky. He graduated from grammar school and attended high school for one year before enlisting in the United States Marine Corps on April 26, 1963, in Dayton, Ohio, shortly after his seventeenth birthday.

In August 1963, after completing recruit training at Marine Corps Recruit Depot San Diego, he was transferred to the Marine Corps Base Camp Pendleton, where he underwent individual combat training with the Second Infantry Training Regiment, graduating in October 1963.

He then joined Company H, 2nd Battalion 4th Marines, 1st Marine Brigade, in Hawaii where he was promoted to private first class in December 1963 and to lance corporal in October 1964. With that unit, he sailed for the Far East, arriving in Chu Lai, Republic of Vietnam on May 7, 1965, where this unit was redesignated Company H, 2nd Battalion, 4th Marines, 3rd Marine Division.

On August 18, 1965, while serving as a fire team leader with Company H, LCpl Paul placed himself between his wounded comrades and the enemy and delivered effective suppressive fire in order to divert the Viet Cong long enough to allow the casualties to be evacuated. He fought in this exposed position until he was mortally wounded. He succumbed to his wounds the next day, August 19, 1965.

Joe C. Paul was buried in the Dayton Memorial Park Cemetery in Dayton.

== Awards and honors ==
Paul's medals and decorations include:

Medal of Honor	Purple Heart	Combat Action Ribbon
National Defense Service Medal	Vietnam Service Medal w/ 1 service star	Vietnam Campaign Medal

- The United States Navy Knox-class destroyer escort, USS Paul (FF-1080) (ex-DE 1080) was named for LCpl Paul. The ship was christened and launched on June 20, 1970, and decommissioned in August 1992.
- Paul's name was inscribed on the Vietnam Veterans Memorial on Panel 02E, Line 063.

=== Medal of Honor citation ===
The President of the United States in the name of The Congress takes pride in presenting the MEDAL OF HONOR posthumously to

LANCE CORPORAL JOE C. PAUL
UNITED STATES MARINE CORPS

for service as set forth in the following CITATION:

For conspicuous gallantry and intrepidity at the risk of his life above and beyond the call of duty as a Fire Team Leader with Company H, Second Battalion, Fourth Marines, Third Marine Division (Reinforced) during Operation STARLITE near Chu Lai in the Republic of Vietnam on 18 August 1965. In violent battle, Lance Corporal Paul's platoon sustained five casualties as it was temporarily pinned down by devastating mortar, recoilless rifle, automatic weapons, and rifle fire delivered by insurgent communist (Viet Cong) forces in well-entrenched positions. The wounded Marines were unable to move from their perilously exposed positions forward of the remainder of their platoon, and were suddenly subjected to a barrage of white phosphorus rifle grenades. Corporal Paul, fully aware that his tactics would almost certainly result in serious injury or death to himself, chose to disregard his own safety and boldly dashed across the fire-swept rice paddies, placed himself between his wounded comrades and the enemy, and delivered effective suppressive fire with his automatic weapon in order to divert the attack long enough to allow the casualties to be evacuated. Although critically wounded during the course of the battle, he resolutely remained in his exposed position and continued to fire his rifle until he collapsed and was evacuated. By his fortitude and gallant spirit of self-sacrifice in the face of almost certain death, he saved the lives of several of his fellow Marines. His heroic action served to inspire all who observed him and reflect the highest credit upon himself, the Marine Corps and the United States Naval Service. He gallantly gave his life in the cause of freedom.

/S/ LYNDON B. JOHNSON

== See also ==
- List of Medal of Honor recipients
- List of Medal of Honor recipients for the Vietnam War
