= Leatherneck Square =

Leatherneck Square was an area just south of the Vietnamese Demilitarized Zone that separated North Vietnam and South Vietnam.

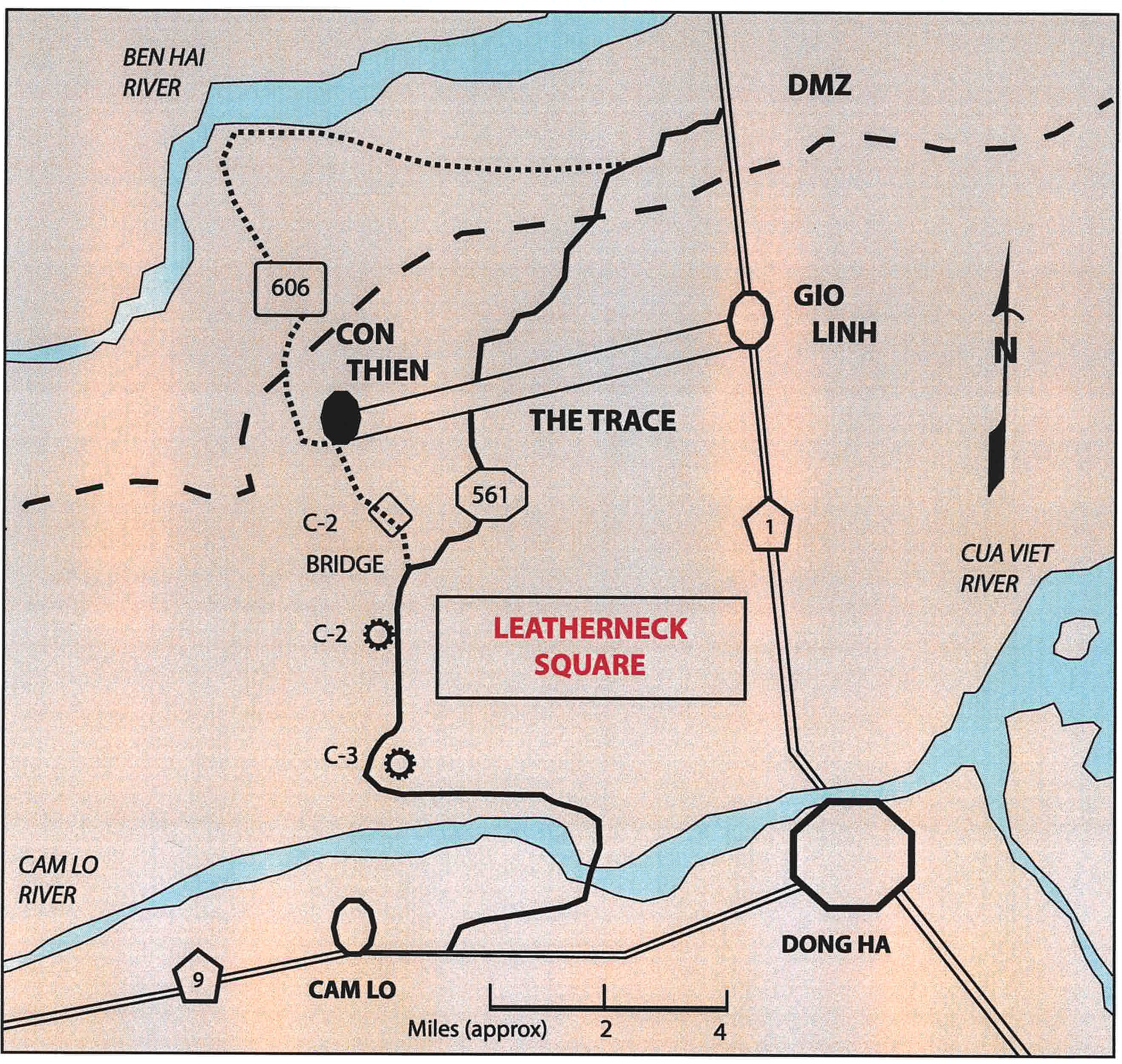
Map of Leatherneck Square

The corners of the square were Con Thien and Firebase Gio Linh in the north, Đông Hà Combat Base and Cam Lộ, in the south, making it about 6 miles (9.7 km) wide (east to west) and about 9 miles (14 km) deep north to south).

Some of the heaviest fighting of the Vietnam War was fought in this 54+ square mile area. The official figures on losses in all operations in this area from Operation Prairie III/IV, through Hickory, Cimarron, Buffalo, Kingfisher and Kentucky, i.e., from March 1967 to February, 1969 were 1,419 Marines and Navy Corpsmen killed in action and 9,265 Marines and Corpsmen wounded in action. People's Army of Vietnam losses were put at 7,563 killed, wounded unknown.
