= Operation Buffalo (1967) =

Military operation in the Vietnam War

- Part of Vietnam War
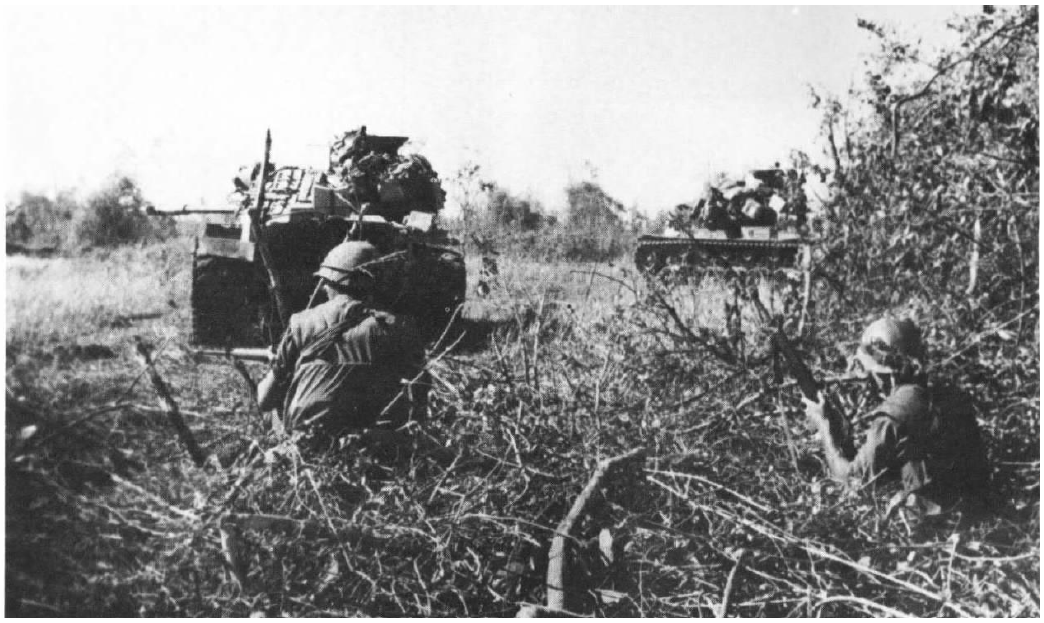
- Company K, 3/9 Marines with 3rd Tank Battalion M48 tanks
Date	2–14 July 1967
Location	Quang Tri Province, South Vietnam
Result	US declares victory Launch of Operation Kingfisher

Belligerents
United States	North Vietnam

Commanders and leaders
Col. George E. Jerue	

Units involved
1st Battalion, 9th Marines; 3rd Battalion, 9th Marines; 1st Battalion, 3rd Marines; 2nd Battalion, 3rd Marines	90th Regiment, 324B Division

Strength
~3,000	~1,500

Casualties and losses
159 killed 1 missing	US body count: 1,290 killed 513 probably killed 1 captured 100 weapons recovered

Operation Buffalo (2–14 July 1967) was an operation of the Vietnam War that took place in the southern half of the Demilitarized Zone, around Con Thien.

== Operation ==
=== 2 July ===
On the morning of 2 July, Alpha and Bravo Companies, 1st Battalion, 9th Marines made their way up north on Highway 561 and secured a crossroad as their first objective. As they went further north between Gia Binh and An Kha, near a place called "The Market Place" (16.927°N 107.00°E), they made contact with the elements of the People's Army of Vietnam (PAVN) 90th Regiment when sniper fire began to break out. Enemy fire intensified as efforts were made by the 3rd Platoon to suppress it. Tri-directional ambushes had virtually decimated company B. Alpha Company, sent to rescue Company B was ambushed. During the battle the PAVN used flamethrowers in combat for the first time setting fire to hedgerows along Highway 561 forcing the Marines out into the open, exposing them to artillery, mortar and small arms fire, causing heavy casualties on A and B Companies and prevented them from linking up. B Company Headquarters was wiped out when a single PAVN artillery round exploded within the command group. The company commander, Capt. Sterling K. Coates, two platoon commanders, the radio operator, forward observer and several others were killed.

Airstrikes disrupted PAVN attempts to "hug" the 1st Platoon, eventually allowing the 1st Platoon and the battered 2nd Platoon to link up. 1/9's commander, LtCol Richard Schening, sent out a small rescue force involving C and D Companies supported by four tanks. Using helicopter and tank fire to disperse enemy troops, D Company was able to secure a helicopter landing zone for the evacuation of casualties. C Company then continued to move north under heavy fire to rescue what was left of the two Companies.

Out of nearly 400 Marines, the two Companies suffered 84 killed, 190 wounded and 9 missing making this the worst one-day loss for the Marines in Vietnam. Only 27 Marines from B/1/9 and about 90 from A/1/9 were fit for duty after the first day. U.S. forces reported that the PAVN suffered 55 killed with another 88 believed to have been killed, but unaccounted for.

=== 3–5 July ===
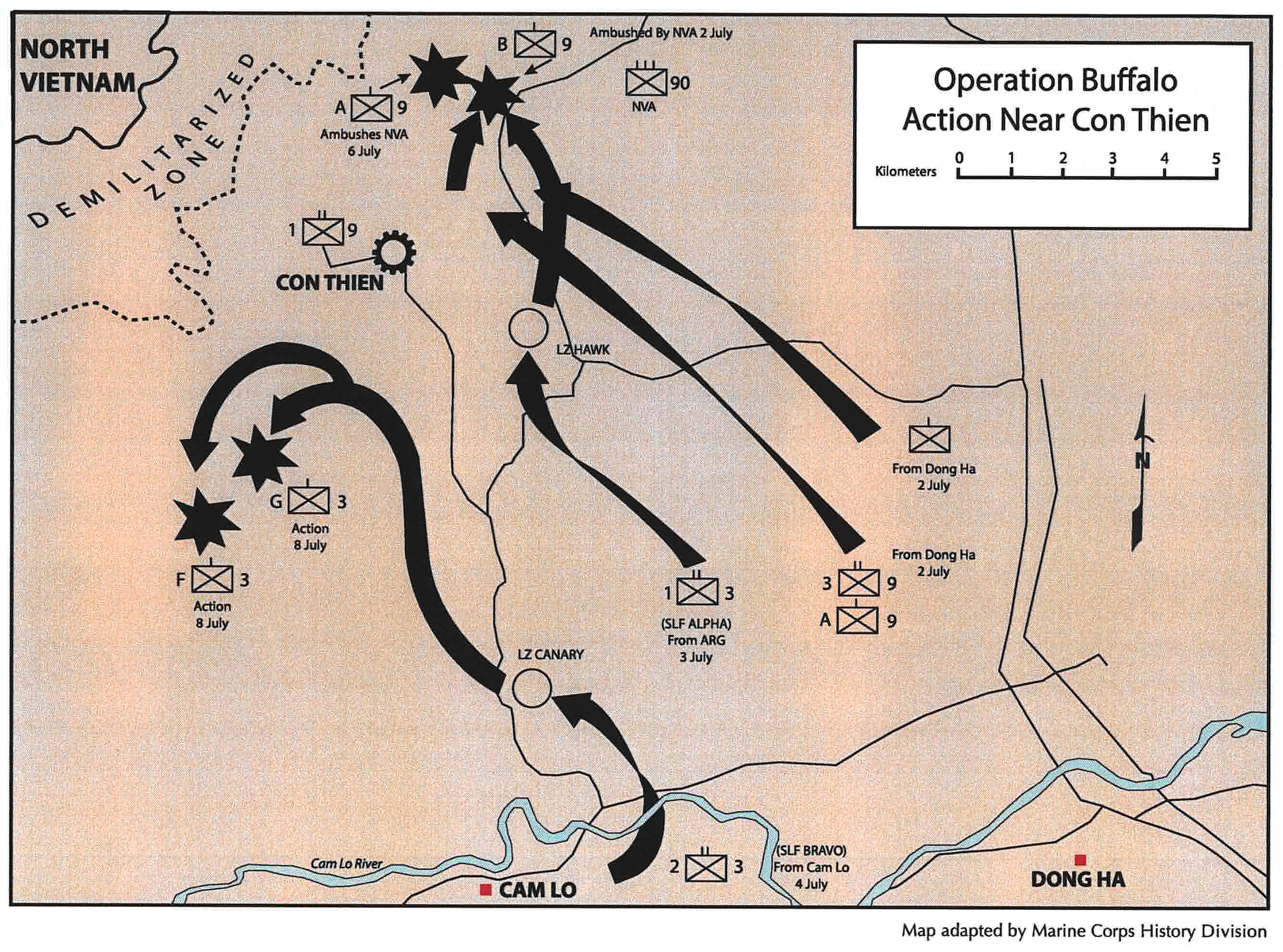
Map of Operation Buffalo

On 3 July a USAF observer spotted more than 100 PAVN soldiers moving south from positions north of Con Thien, Battery E, 3/12 Marines fired on them killing 75 men.

On the morning of 4 July, following 12 hours of preparatory airstrikes, 3/9 Marines supported by Battalion Landing Team (BLT) 1/3 Marines attacked towards the Marketplace ambush site to recover the bodies of those killed on 2 July. 3/9 Marines met heavy resistance from the PAVN southwest of the Marketplace and by the end of the day had suffered 15 dead and 33 wounded, while BLT 1/3 suffered 11 wounded.

On 5 July the Marines operating north of Con Thien came under artillery and mortar fire, but there was little ground contact and the Marines were able to collect the dead from the 2 July fighting. It was reported that some of the Marines were shot at point-blank range by the PAVN, some of the bodies had been booby-trapped while others had been mutilated by the PAVN. In the afternoon PAVN soldiers were seen 3 km northeast of Con Thien and artillery and tactical air strikes were called in resulting in US claims of an estimated 200 PAVN killed.

=== 6–7 July ===
On the morning of 6 July BLT 2/3 ran into a PAVN force north of Con Thien and killed 35 PAVN for the loss of 5 killed and 25 wounded. Company A, 9th Marines reinforced by the survivors of Company C and a detachment of the 3rd Reconnaissance Battalion moved northeast of Con Thien and established a forward fighting position. By the afternoon 1/3 and 2/3 Marines were stopped by PAVN artillery fire and an aerial observer reported that 400 PAVN soldiers had crossed the Ben Hai River and were heading towards the two Battalions. The PAVN force was unaware of the presence of Company A 9th Marines who were able to ambush the PAVN force, the PAVN quickly reorganized and attacked Company A, but were unable to penetrate their lines and Marine artillery fire effectively boxed in the defending Marines. The following morning Company A counted 154 PAVN dead, while suffering only 12 wounded. While the PAVN force attacked Company A, the remainder of the PAVN 90th Regiment attacked 1/3 and 2/3 Marines achieving negligible results before breaking contact at 21:30.

Also on 6 July the PAVN fired eight SA-2s from positions north of the DMZ hitting an A-4E #151032 of VMA-311 as it conducted close air support in front of 1/3's lines. The pilot Maj. Ralph Brubaker ejected successfully and was rescued the following day.

On the morning of 7 July Company A was withdrawn into the Battalion perimeter just before a heavy PAVN artillery bombardment hit their ambush positions of the previous day. 7 July saw minimal ground contact and the Marines spent most of the day trying to achieve an accurate PAVN body count, but this proved difficult due to the carnage caused by the artillery and air strikes.

=== 8 July ===
On the morning of 8 July BLT 2/3 moved southwest towards the Cam Lo River when they discovered a PAVN bunker complex. Air and artillery strikes were called in and then Company G attacked the bunkers, the PAVN lost 39 killed while the Marines suffered 2 dead and 29 wounded. In the afternoon Company G engaged another PAVN force and the PAVN lost 118 killed while the Marines suffered 14 dead and 43 wounded.

=== 9–14 July ===
For the remainder of the operation there were no further ground contacts and the Marines only encountered mines and harassing artillery fire.

== Aftermath ==
The operation ended on 14 July with total Marine casualties for the operation amounting to 159 killed, 845 wounded and 1 missing. U.S. forces claimed that the PAVN suffered 1,290 killed and a further 513 probably killed. 164 bunkers and 15 artillery and rocket positions were destroyed. Around 100 PAVN weapons were recovered or captured.

One marine who fought in the operation recounted 40 years later that he and other Marines were cynical of claimed PAVN casualty figures in the fighting along the DMZ, stating that "If we sent in a body count of fifteen to the headquarters for the Marines Corps in Vietnam, it would turn into twenty or thirty and by the time it got to MACV in Saigon it would turn into fifty or sixty".

1st Lt Gatlin J. Howell and SSgt Leon R. Burns were both awarded the Navy Cross for their actions during this battle.

The Marines launched Operation Hickory II and Operation Kingfisher in the same general area within days of the conclusion of Operation Buffalo.
