= Crayon-eating Marine trope =

Humorous trope associated with the US Marine Corps

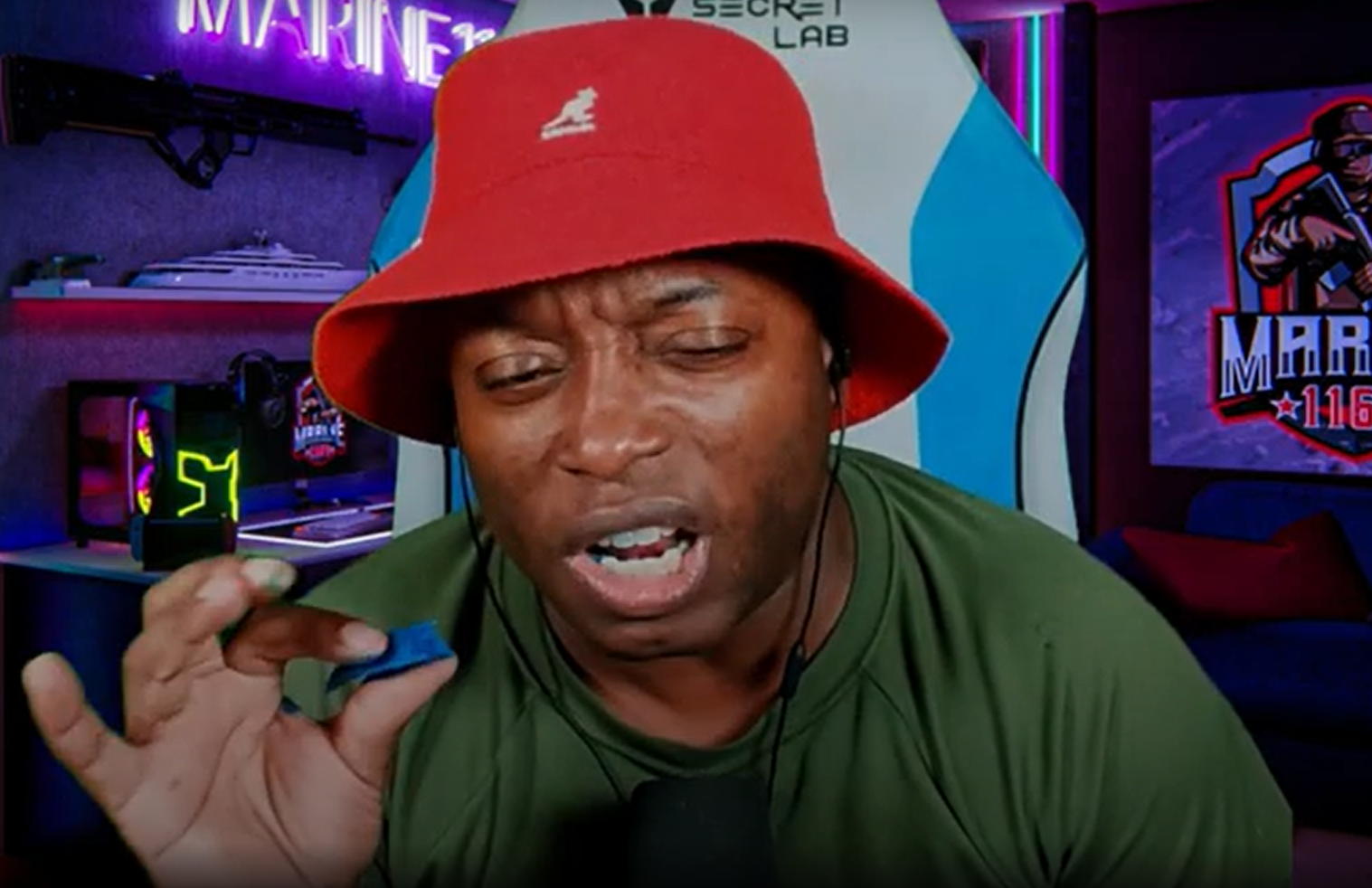
Marine1169, a U.S. Marine veteran, eating an edible crayon made by Crayons Ready-to-Eat

The crayon-eating Marine is a humorous trope (or meme) associated with the United States Marine Corps, emerging online in the early 2010s. Playing off of a stereotype of Marines as unintelligent, the trope supposes that they frequently eat crayons and drink glue. In an instance of self-deprecating humor, the crayon-eater trope was popularized by Marines through social media and in Maximilian Uriarte's comic strip Terminal Lance. The joke's ubiquity has led to real-life humorous consumption of crayons and has been referenced by the Marine Corps itself in celebration of National Crayon Day. Multiple products have capitalized on the trend, including two lines of edible crayons created by Marine veterans and a coloring book by Uriarte.

== Origin and spread ==
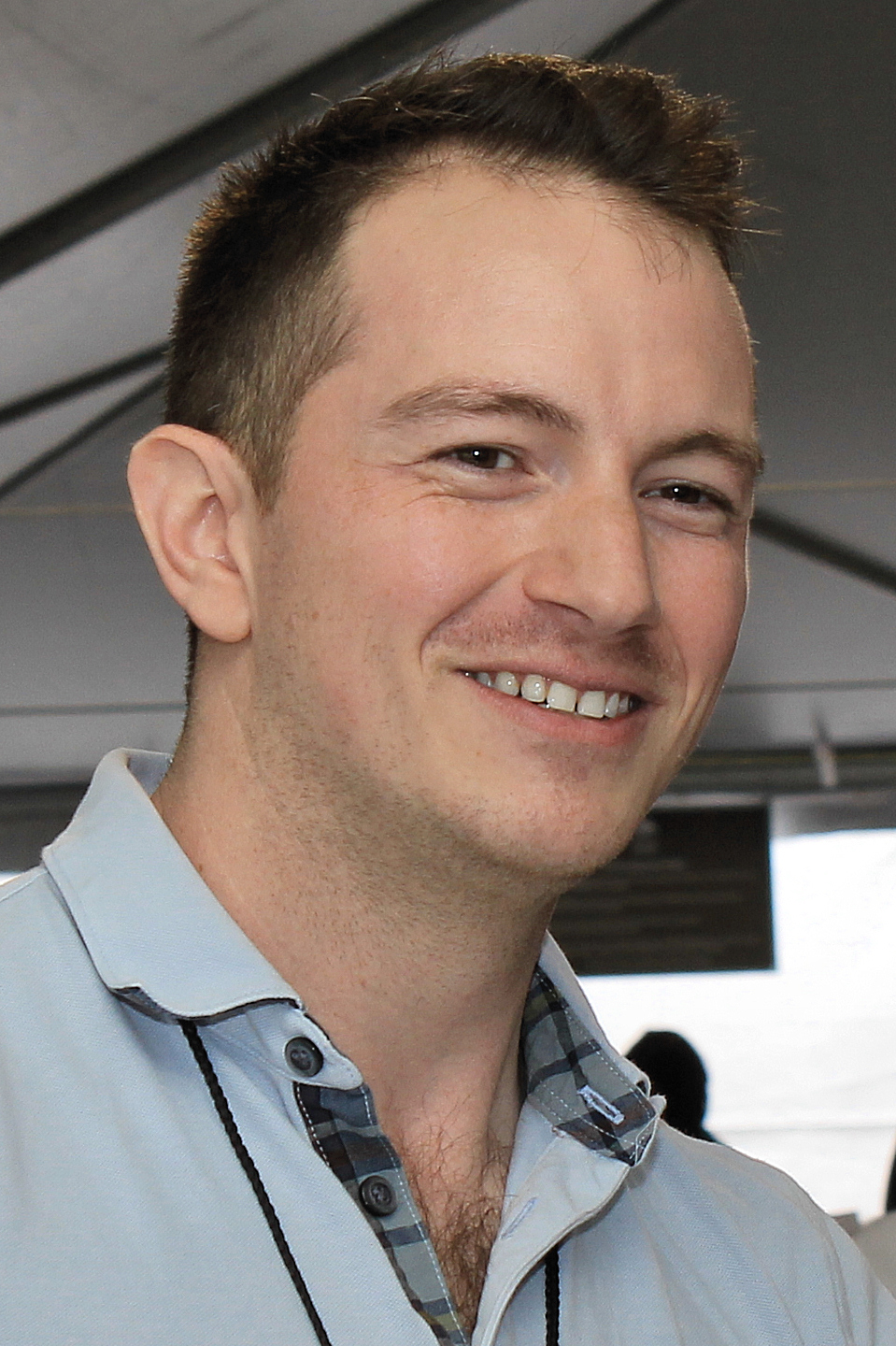
Maximilian Uriarte helped popularize the trope through his comic Terminal Lance.

Interservice rivalries between the United States military branches include stereotypes about each branch. A common joke about the Marine Corps is that Marines are unintelligent. This has led to the humorous notion that Marines, due to their low intelligence, mistake crayons for food and eat them. Alex Hollings of The National Interest describes this as "By far ... the most popular way to insult a Marine's intelligence".

Task & Purpose notes a Pinterest post from 2010 that may refer to the idea of Marines and crayons, and a Facebook post from 2012 that uses "I wanna be a crayon eater" as a cadence. The trope became more popular in 2014 and 2015, before going viral in 2016, possibly due to a post on a Facebook page titled "Untied Status Marin Crops", in which two United States Army soldiers prank a Marine with a Meal, Ready-to-Eat (MRE) containing crayons and glue, only for the Marine to promptly eat both and ask for jalapeño cheese sauce. The trope of the crayon-eating Marine subsequently entered widespread use throughout the Corps, popularized through venues including Untied Status Marin Crops and the comic Terminal Lance as a form of self-deprecating humor.

Marine Corps video uploaded for National Crayon Day in 2018

On National Crayon Day in 2018, the Marine Corps posted a video to Facebook showing a Marine opening an MRE—ostensibly a gift from the Army—and finding crayons inside, followed by a record scratch and a close-up of his face. Another notable take on the trope was a 2019 article in the satirical Duffel Blog, which imagines a crayon-eating competition in which a Marine dies because he was not told he needed to chew the crayons.

Heckler & Koch, in a later-deleted February 2019 post humorously referring to their M27 rifles as "Marine-proof", teased Marines as "crayon eaters", which Task & Purpose characterized as both "deliciously viral" and a "silly ploy to troll Marines and get a pat on the head from corporate overlords". A 2021 article in the Marine Corps Gazette, a professional journal, bemoans low graduate degree levels in the Marine Corps as "unflatteringly reinforc[ing] the crayon-eating stereotype for Marines".

Hollings recounts that at an event in the late 2010s, he and a fellow Marine were served crayons as a joke, and that he ate one to cheers from the crowd. Eating crayons has become a humorous tradition for Marines at graduations and Marine Corps balls.

== Commercialization ==
In 2018, veteran Frank Manteau and colleague Cassandra Gordon began selling chocolate crayons that are usable for drawing, under the name Crayons Ready-to-Eat. Manteau has said he was inspired by a video of a Marine eating an actual crayon at a Marine Corps ball. After initial sales only in San Diego, California, followed by setbacks due to the COVID-19 pandemic, Manteau and Gordon's MILTreats prepared a national launch in February 2021; the product was available nationwide by March 2023. The crayons are triangular, to avoid rolling away and to be easily visually distinguished from non-edible ones.

Others to commercialize the trope include: veteran Tashina Coronel, who as of August 2020 was selling edible crayons and glue through her confectionery business, Sweets by Okashi; veteran Spencer Garvin, whose Sven Smash Designs has manufactured a "crayon-eater" challenge coin that doubles as a bottle opener; and Icarus Brewing, which sells a beer called Drinking Crayons. In 2023, Maximilian Uriarte of Terminal Lance created a coloring book called Coloring for Marines, based on the trope.
