= 3rd Battalion, 3rd Marines =

Infantry battalion of the United States Marine Corps

3rd Battalion 3rd Marines
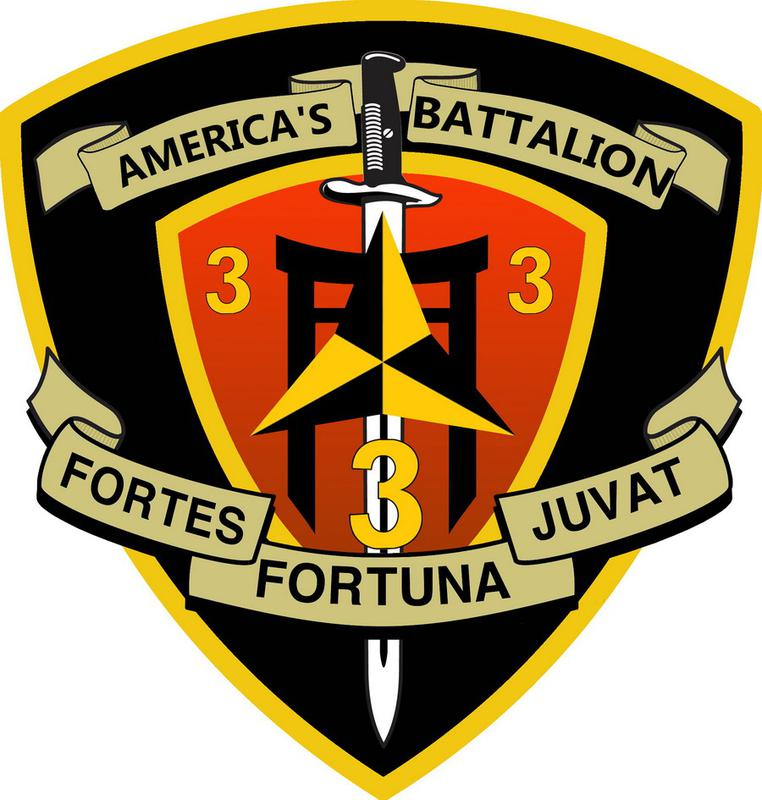
- The official emblem for 3rd Battalion 3rd Marines
- Active: 1 June 1942 – 20 December 1945; 1 August 1951 – 1 June 1974; 31 October 1975 – 13 January 2023
- Country: United States of America
- Branch: United States Marine Corps
- Type: Light infantry
- Size: Battalion
- Part of: 3rd Marine Division
- Nicknames: "Trinity", "America's Battalion"
- Mottos: Fortuna Fortes Juvat (English: "Fortune Favors the Brave")
- Anniversaries: 1 June – Battalion Birthday
- Engagements: World War II; Pacific War; Solomon Islands campaign; Bougainville campaign; Mariana and Palau Islands campaign; Battle of Guam (1944); Volcano and Ryukyu Islands campaign; Battle of Iwo Jima; Vietnam War; Operation Starlite; Operation Harvest Moon; Operation Macon; The Hill Fights; Operation Kingfisher; Tet Offensive; May offensive; Operation Taylor Common; Operation Virginia Ridge; Operation Idaho Canyon; Iran Hostage Crisis; Operation Eagle Claw; Gulf War; Battle of Khafji; Liberation of Kuwait campaign; War on terror; War in Afghanistan (2001–2021); Train Advise Assist Command – East; Helmand province campaign; Nawa; Battle of Garmsir; Iraq War; Anbar campaign; Al-Karmah

Commanders
- Notable commanders: Ralph Houser; Joseph Muir †; Charles Krulak

3rd Battalion, 3rd Marines, abbreviated as (3/3), was an infantry marines battalion of the United States Marine Corps (USMC) that specialized in close with and destroy the enemy with firepower and maneuver warfare, based out of Kaneohe, Hawaii. Known as either "Trinity" or "America's Battalion", the unit normally fell under the command of the 3rd Marine Regiment of the 3rd Marine Division. When fully manned, the unit consisted of approximately 1000 U.S. Marines and United States Navy Sailors. (Note: Traditionally, the United States Navy has, and still does to this day, supply the U.S. Marine Corps with both hospital corpsmen and chaplains. See also Marine Corps Operating Forces.) Like most 20th century model infantry marines battalions of the U.S. Marine Corps, 3rd Battalion 3rd Marines was made up of three rifle companies (India, Kilo, and Lima), a weapons company (machine gunners, mortarman, assaultmen, snipers and TOW gunners), and a Headquarters and Services (H&S) company.

The battalion was originally formed at Marine Corps Base Camp Lejeune, North Carolina in 1942 and saw action on both Bougainville and Guam during World War II, where it was awarded its first Presidential Unit Citation and Navy Unit Commendation. Marines in the battalion were also awarded one Medal of Honor and seven Navy Crosses during the war.

Following World War II, 3rd Battalion was disbanded until 1951, when it was reformed in California. The battalion was alerted for possible deployment during the 1956 Suez War and the 1958 intervention in Lebanon. In 1965, the Marines of 3rd Battalion were deployed to the Vietnam War and participated in Operation Starlite, the first major Marine engagement of that conflict. The battalion continued to see major action through Vietnam and was rotated back to the United States in 1969. Famous alumni from its time in Vietnam include Corporal Robert Emmett O'Malley, the first Marine in Vietnam to be awarded the Medal of Honor, Oliver North, and John Ripley. Around the end of the Vietnam War, the Battalion was deactivated for a second time in 1974.

In 1975, 3rd Battalion was reformed for the third time at Marine Corps Base Hawaii. During this period, the battalion conducted numerous deployments in the Pacific and Indian Oceans. In 1983, 3rd Battalion deployed off the coast of Lebanon for several weeks during a particularly tense period in the civil war. During the 1980s, the battalion was briefly commanded by Charles Krulak, later the 31st Commandant of the Marine Corps, who nicknamed 3rd Battalion 3rd Marines "America's Battalion." 3rd Battalion deployed again in 1990 as part of Operation Desert Shield and saw action at the Battle of Khafji and again during the liberation of Kuwait. In the early 21st century the battalion deployed overseas six times as part of the global war on terror: three times for Operation Enduring Freedom in Afghanistan and three times for Operation Iraqi Freedom in Iraq. One Marine from the battalion, Dakota Meyer, was awarded the Medal of Honor during the Global War on Terror. After the 3rd Marine Regiment ended combat operations, following 3rd Battalion's final deployment to Afghanistan in 2012, the unit resumed its deployments throughout the Pacific until 2022. As part of Force Design 2030, 3rd Battalion was deactivated in January 2023.

== Organization at Deactivation ==
Like most infantry marines battalions in the Marine Corps in the post-Vietnam era, 3rd Battalion consisted of five companies: three Rifle Companies, a Headquarters and Service Company (H&S), and a Weapons Company. During the Vietnam War, infantry marines battalions had a fourth rifle company, which was replaced with Weapons Company in the 1980s. (Note: In 3rd Battalion, this was Mike Company.)

The rifle companies were designed to act as maneuver elements for the battalion. With attachments they could also be employed independently for short periods of time. Each rifle company ideally consisted of six officers and 176 enlisted personnel and was typically commanded by a Captain, assisted by a First Sergeant. Following the 1980s reorganization, the three rifle companies in 3rd Battalion were Company I, Company K, and Company L. Because the Marine Corps uses the NATO phonetic alphabet, in 3rd Battalion these companies were commonly known as India, Kilo, and Lima. (Note: For the sake of clarity, these names are the ones used throughout the article) Prior to 1956, under the Joint Army/Navy Phonetic Alphabet, they were known as Item, King, and Love. During the Korean War era, 3d battalions typically contained G (George), H (How), and I (Item) companies.

H&S Company provided combat service support and consisted of the battalion staff, including the headquarters element, communications, medical, and service platoons. While not a maneuver unit itself, H&S provided the battalion with command and control, surveillance, target acquisition, and service support, making the battalion able to function independently without the direct involvement of a higher headquarters. Weapons Company provided fire support coordination, medium mortars, anti-armor weapons, and heavy machine gun support for the rifle companies. Generally, these elements of Weapons Company were directly employed by the battalion, but could also be attached to the rifle companies.

== World War II (1942–1945) ==
=== Formation and Deployment (1942–1943) ===
Battles involving 3rd Battalion 3rd Marines Deployments of 3rd Battalion 3rd Marines Planned operations involving 3rd Battalion 3rd Marines which were either cancelled or the battalion ultimately did not participate in

3rd Battalion 3rd Marines was activated on 1 June 1942 at New River, North Carolina as the 5th Training Battalion. At that time the Marine Corps was in the middle of an unprecedented wartime expansion, growing from 19,000 men in September 1939 to 100,000 men in February 1942. Because of this, two weeks after the Battle of Midway, the old 3rd Regiment from the Banana Wars was reformed as the 3rd Marine Regiment with three battalions. Initially designated as the 1st, 3rd, and 5th Training Battalions, on 16 June they would later become the 1st, 2nd, and 3rd Battalions of the 3rd Marine Regiment. The core of the new 3rd Battalion consisted of officers and enlisted men left behind from the 1st Marine Division shortly before it deployed to the South Pacific in April. The rest were recruits fresh off Parris Island. The first two months of 3rd Battalion's existence were spent just getting organized. On 25 July, Admiral Ernest King, the Chief of Naval Operations, ordered the 3rd Marine Regiment to garrison Tutuila, American Samoa, freeing up the 8th Marine Regiment for future combat operations. On 24 August, 3rd Battalion left New River by train for San Diego. On 31 August, the battalion boarded the SS Lurline and began the two-week voyage to Samoa.

Upon arriving in Samoa, 3rd Battalion had many of its experienced officers and enlisted transferred to the 8th Marine Regiment, prior to that regiment's deployment to Guadalcanal. The Marines lived in small wooden huts called fales. It rained constantly, and the rain bred mosquitoes that carried the disease Filariasis, an intense swelling of the arms and legs. However, the 3rd Battalion trained constantly and studied the combat reports coming out of Guadalcanal, which led to the 3rd Marine Regiment gaining expertise in jungle warfare by the summer of 1943. An officer candidate school was opened and many Noncommissioned Officers were given the opportunity to become Lieutenants. By the time the 3rd Marine Division arrived in the South Pacific, 3rd Battalion had already been training for eight months and was prepared for its initial entry into combat.

By this time, 3rd Battalion had left Samoa on 23 May and joined up with the 3rd Marine Division in Papatoetoe, New Zealand. On 25 August, they moved with the division to a staging area on Guadalcanal, which had become the main U.S. base in the Solomon Islands. For the next nine months, 3rd Battalion would conduct advanced training out of Camp Coconut Grove near the Tetere Beach. No fewer than three major amphibious assaults would be planned from here. The invasion of Bougainville, announced on 27 September, was the first.

=== Bougainville (1943) ===
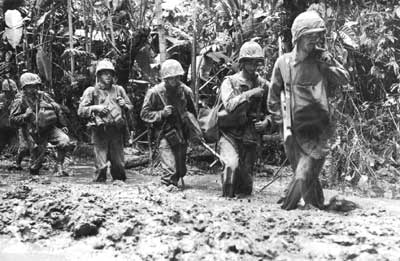
3rd Battalion Marines from Kilo (then-King) Company on Bougainville in 1943.

On 1 November 1943, the 3rd Battalion landed at Cape Torokina with the rest of 3rd Marines, just east of the Koromokina River. While resistance was extremely light, the rough surf and dense jungle (which in many places extended all the way to the water) resulted in numerous landing craft being lost or damaged beyond repair. For the next two weeks, the battalion helped construct a series of trails that linked the beachhead with the advancing units, and made supply much easier. On 16 November the battalion reached the Numa Numa Trail and began probing for Japanese units. On 18 November after a sharp firefight near a Japanese roadblock the battalion recovered a Japanese map with valuable intelligence on Japanese defenses. From 19 to 21 November, 3rd Battalion continued probing for Japanese units, which had been identified as elements of the 23rd Infantry Regiment, and engaging in sporadic firefights. In the lead-up to the Battle of Piva Forks, 3rd Battalion seized critical high terrain that would give the Marines the advantage in the upcoming fight. The actual battle, from 22 to 26 November, saw some of the most vicious close combat experienced in the Pacific War as of that date. 3rd Battalion additionally suffered many casualties from unusually accurate Japanese mortar and artillery fire. Two days later, after 27 days of continuous action, 3rd Battalion was moved to a relatively quiet sector on the 3rd Division's flank where it remained for the remainder of the operation.

In December, the 3rd Marine Division was relieved by the Army's Americal Division and 3rd Battalion left Bougainville for Guadalcanal on Christmas Day, 1943 with the rest of the division. They left behind 36 of their comrades, including Corporal John Logan Jr. and Captain Robert Turnbull (Lima Company), who were both awarded Navy Crosses during the Battle of Piva Forks. 165 other Marines from 3rd Battalion became casualties during the campaign. After Bougainville, 3rd Battalion conducted numerous training exercises on Guadalcanal from January to May 1944 in preparation for the invasion of Kavieng in April (which was cancelled) and the Marianas in June. While 3rd Marines was designated as the floating reserve for the initial invasion of Saipan, they were ultimately not landed and returned to Eniwetok for a three-week stay prior to the invasion of Guam. During the interlude, the Marines of 3rd Battalion were primarily confined to their transport ship, the USS Warren.

=== Guam (1944) ===
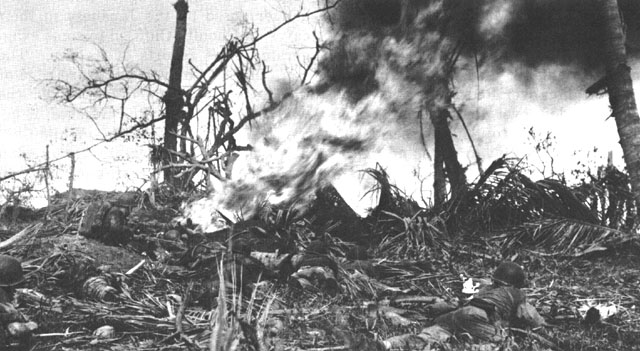
3rd Battalion Marines engaging Japanese positions at Adelup Point on Guam with a flamethrower on 21 July 1944.

On 21 July 1944, around 0830, 3rd Battalion hit the Asan beaches on Guam. Landing on the extreme left of the entire 3rd Marine Division, their mission was to take Chonito Cliff and Adelup Point, which marked the left flank of the division. Within minutes, the Japanese defenders opened up with mortars and machine guns, hitting many 3rd Battalion Marines coming ashore. By 0912, battalion commander Lieutenant Colonel Ralph Houser reported many casualties caused by both mortars and sniper fire. Both Kilo and India Companies rushed the Chonito Cliffs but the Japanese defenders (Elements of the 2nd Battalion, 18th Regiment and 320th Independent Infantry Battalion) resisted strongly, in some cases rolling grenades down the hillside. Supported by flamethrowers, half-tracks, and armor from the 3rd Tank Battalion, 3rd Battalion fought a three-hour battle up the side of Chonito Cliff. Houser then ordered Lima Company to flank the cliffs to the north by dashing down an exposed beach road. Having secured Chonito Cliff, the battalion then moved on to Adelup Point. The U.S. Navy sent a destroyer to blast the Japanese caves at point-blank range and 3rd Battalion flamethrowers burned out Japanese soldiers who still remained. After securing Adelup Point, 3rd Battalion finished the day providing flank security for the rest of the 3rd Marines during the Battle for Bundschu Ridge and became the only unit in the regiment to accomplish its objectives by the end of W-Day.

The first night of 21–22 July, the Marines of 3rd Battalion came under a concerted counterattack by the survivors of the Japanese 320th Independent Infantry Battalion, as well as the 319th, committed by Japanese commander General Kiyoshi Shigematsu to retake the Chonito Cliffs. The Japanese managed to infiltrate past many 3rd Battalion units through ravines and dry river beds and briefly threatened to overrun the battalion command post. The fighting was so heavy that parts of the Division Reserve were committed. Additionally, the destroyer USS McKee was unable to provide close fire support, as the Japanese and Marines were so closely intermingled. However, the Marines managed to repulse the attack by 0830. During the counterattack, Private First Class Luther Skaggs, Jr.—a mortarman with Kilo Company—was critically wounded in the leg by a Japanese grenade. After applying a tourniquet, Skaggs continued to fight for another eight hours before moving unassisted to the rear where most of his leg was amputated. For this, he became the first Marine from 3rd Battalion to be awarded the Medal of Honor. Over the next two days, the 3rd Battalion battled with the Japanese defenders for the Chonito Cliffs and Fonte Plateau area, as the battalion struggled to capture the Mt. Tenjo Road. On 23 July, 3rd Battalion seized the last ridge leading to the Fonte Plateau, provoking a heavy Japanese counterattack. LtCol Houser was seriously wounded in this engagement, resulting in the executive officer, Maj. Royal Bastian, to take command. The 3rd Battalion, then reinforced with tanks, took part in the assault on the Fonte Plateau on 25 July, seizing the key position after an hour of fighting. The night of 25–26 July saw the climax of the fighting on Guam when the Japanese launched a counterattack against the Americans. In the 3rd Battalion's sector, Japanese sailors of the 54th Keibitai launched a series of failed attacks against the now-well defended Marine positions. Backed up with artillery, the Marines easily repulsed the Japanese.

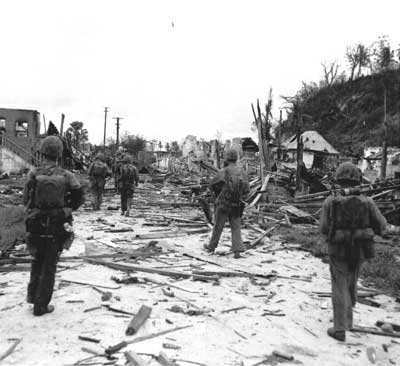
Marines from 3rd Battalion securing the town of Agana on Guam on 31 July 1944.

On the morning of 31 July, 3rd Battalion proceeded east on the Mt. Tenjo road towards the island capital of Agana, which it liberated the same day after token resistance. By 1045, 3rd Battalion had reached the central plaza and stopped at the northern outskirts by noon. Resuming the offensive at 1545, 3rd Battalion pushed forward 1,500 yards to seize key road junctions that led to the towns of Finegayan and Barrigada. For the remaining ten days of the campaign, the battalion marched northeast up the coast, encountering occasional Japanese resistance until the island was declared secure on 10 August. However, the Japanese were not totally defeated. On 7 August, as 3rd Battalion led the regimental advance towards Road Junction 460, Japanese artillery shells began landing among the advancing Marines. After Marines discovered the source of fire—a 75mm artillery piece—the Japanese fled. The final action by 3rd Battalion during the campaign was on 9 August when a nearby battalion came under heavy Japanese tank and infantry attack. Blazing a trail through the jungle, 3rd Battalion rushed towards the action but the Japanese tanks vanished before the battalion could arrive. Casualties for the 3rd Battalion were twice that of Bougainville, with 300 wounded and 97 killed.

=== Iwo Jima and Japan (1945) ===
Following the invasion of Guam, 3rd Battalion spent two months conducting 'mopping up' operations on the island until November, when it received orders to prepare for operations against Iwo Jima. From November until February 1945, they took part in a rigorous training regimen that reportedly left a minimum of 20% of its members incapacitated due to foot and heat injuries. During the Battle of Iwo Jima, 3rd Battalion—as part of 3rd Marines—remained offshore as the Expeditionary Troops reserve. Despite numerous requests from other Marine officers, the 3rd Marines were never landed. According to one 3rd Battalion veteran, some Marines from the battalion came ashore to unload supplies or with other units that they had recently transferred to. After sitting off Iwo Jima in their transport ships for a month, the 3rd Marines were ordered to return to Guam on 5 March 1945.

Back on Guam, 3rd Battalion began training for a landing on Miyako Jima, an island just south of Okinawa. Those orders were eventually cancelled, but the battalion still saw minor combat in 1945, participating in two operations on Guam designed to capture Japanese soldiers still holding out in the hills. These sweeps took place in April and December 1945. 3rd Battalion also began preparing for Operation Olympic, where as part of V Amphibious Corps, it would have landed at Kushikino, Kagoshima, on Kyūshū. After the dropping of the atomic bombs in August 1945 and Japan's surrender, 3rd Battalion was detached from the 3rd Marine Division in November 1945 and deactivated the following month on 20 December 1945. Shortly before it was deactivated, however, 3rd Battalion suffered the dubious honor of having the last American killed in World War II, when PFC W.C. Patrick Bates of Kilo Company was shot by a Japanese sniper on 14 December during a mopping up operation on Guam (three months after the formal end of hostilities).

== Early Cold War (1951–1965) ==
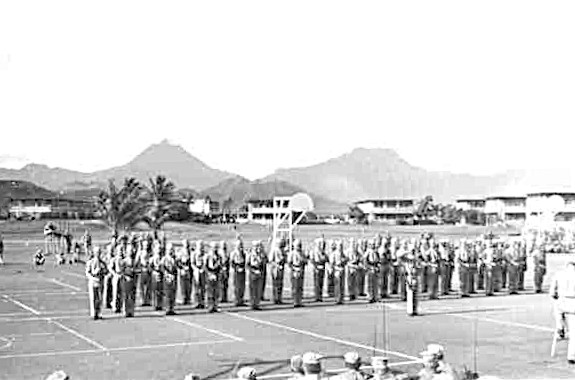
3rd Battalion arriving at Marine Corps Air Station Kaneohe Bay in Hawaii in 1953.

3rd Battalion was reactivated at Marine Corps Base Camp Pendleton in August 1951 as part of the 3rd Marine Brigade during the general Marine Corps expansion as a result of the Korean War. In February 1952, it took part in Lex-Baker-1, which was the first full-scale Marine-Navy exercise held on the West Coast since 1949. In May, India Company participated in the ground portion of the Operation Tumbler–Snapper atomic bomb tests in Nevada. In August, part of the battalion took part in an amphibious landing on Lake Washington as part of Seattle's "Seafair." In December, 3rd Battalion took part in one of the first exercises at Twentynine Palms, California. The entire 3rd Marine Division, including 3rd Battalion 3rd Marines, was transported more than 280 miles (451 km) by truck between MCB Camp Pendleton and Twenty-nine Palms. During the exercise, 3rd Battalion made a night airlift using over 60 helicopters.

In January 1953, the unit deployed to the Marine Corps Air Station Kaneohe Bay on Oahu for six months of training, after which 3rd Battalion returned to Pendleton. In August 1953, 3rd Battalion deployed to Japan for training operations at Kin Beach, Okinawa and Iwo Jima. In October 1956, 3rd Battalion was stationed in Japan when the Suez Crisis broke out. Though initially deployed to the Indian Ocean for possible action in Egypt and the surrounding region, the crisis was ultimately resolved. During this cruise, 3rd Battalion—designated "Battalion Landing Team (BLT) 3/3" – visited Brunei Bay, Bombay, Karachi, and Singapore, before returning to Japan. In December 1956, the 3rd Marine Regiment was deployed off of Indonesia because of civil strife. In 1958, 3rd Battalion was alerted for possible deployment to Lebanon, but its transports were turned back in the Indian Ocean to Okinawa. Four years later, in 1962, the battalion deployed on the USS Bayfield to the Chinese coast to guard the Taiwanese islands of Quemoy and Matsu.

== Vietnam War (1965–1969) ==
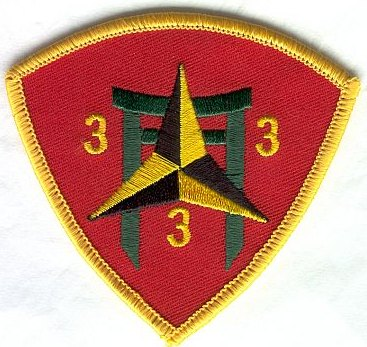
The official emblem for 3rd Battalion, 3rd Marines in Vietnam.

=== Deployment and Operation Starlite (1965) ===
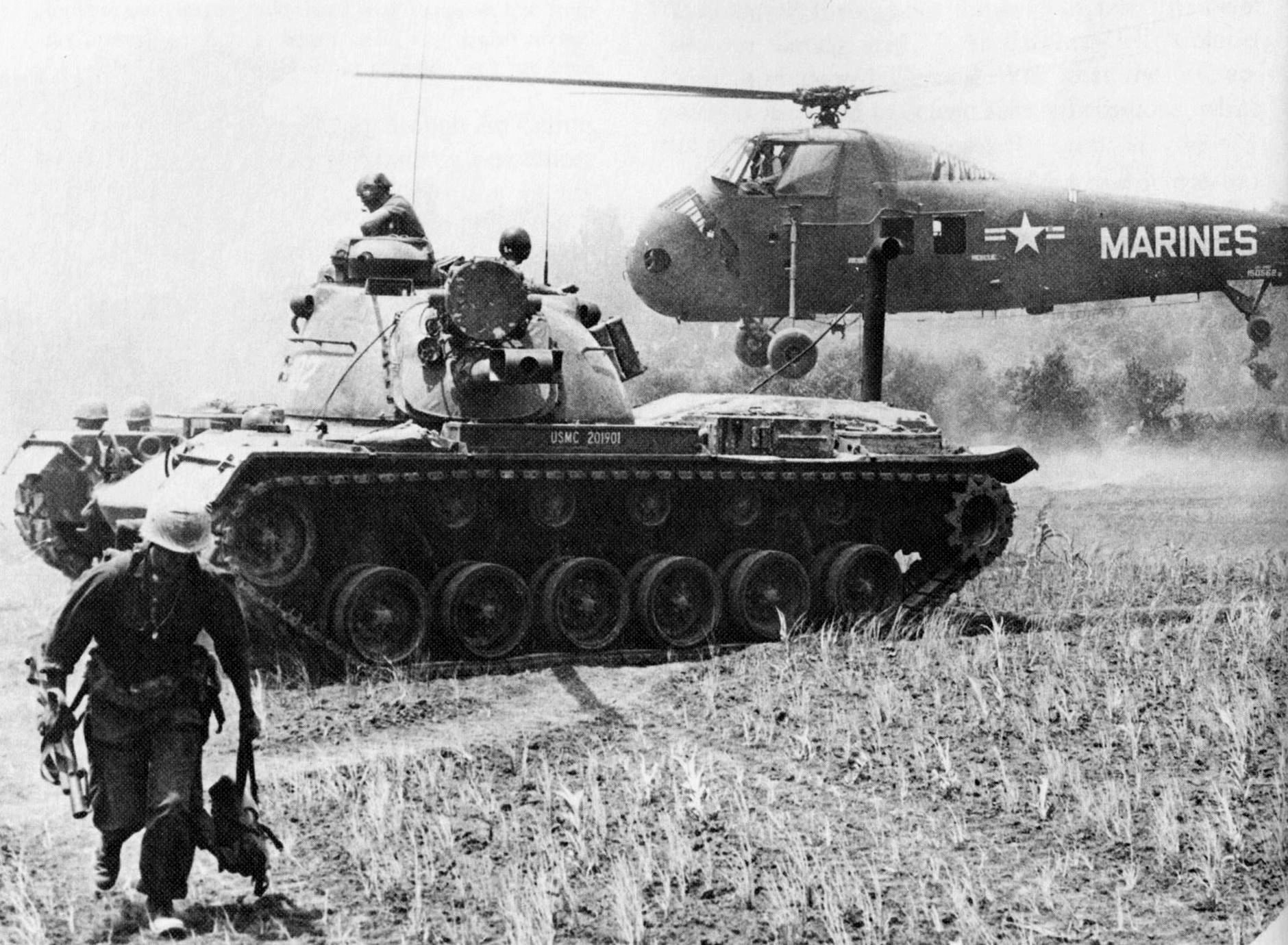
Tank A-32 (attached to 3rd Battalion) during Operation Starlite.

In January 1965, the 2nd Battalion, 1st Marines at Marine Corps Base Camp Pendleton deployed for a tour on Okinawa, where they were redesignated the 3rd Battalion, 3rd Marines. At the time, the Marines of 3rd Battalion expected a typical 13-month deployment followed by a quick return to the United States. However, the battalion found itself caught up in the initial deployment of Marine units to South Vietnam, and landed on 12 May 1965 along the Vietnamese coast south of Danang at Chu Lai. 3rd Battalion's first major operation in the Vietnam War was Operation Starlite, where they teamed up with units of the 7th Marines. Operation Starlite was aimed at destroying the 1st Viet Cong (VC) Regiment, which was preparing to attack Chu Lai from the Van Tuong peninsula. The fighting began on 18 August when the battalion conducted an amphibious landing just east of the VC positions. At first, the attack was slowed by effective VC delaying tactics. However, 3rd Battalion eventually advanced to the outskirts of the village of An Cuong 2. While attempting to clear the village, India Company came under intense fire from VC defending the village. When one squad under Corporal Robert Emmett O'Malley was ambushed, O'Malley jumped into a VC trench and killed eight Viet Cong. Wounded three times, O'Malley refused to be evacuated until his men were safe, and later became the first Marine in the Vietnam War to be awarded the Medal of Honor. India Company then had to fight its way back to the rest of the battalion through other Viet Cong units still operating in the area. Around 1200, an H&S Company supply convoy bound for India Company was ambushed and a force sent to relieve them was also pinned down. The ordeal was covered by journalist Peter Arnett in his article "The Death of Supply Column 21". During the afternoon, the situation was stabilized and the Viet Cong retreated that night, resulting in a tactical American victory. The United States had 52 Marines killed in Starlite. India Company lost 14 dead, including the company commander, and 53 wounded out of a total of 177 Marines. Three Navy Crosses were awarded to Marines from the battalion for actions during Starlite, including the battalion commander Lieutenant Colonel Joseph Muir.

=== Search and Destroy Near Da Nang (1965–1966) ===
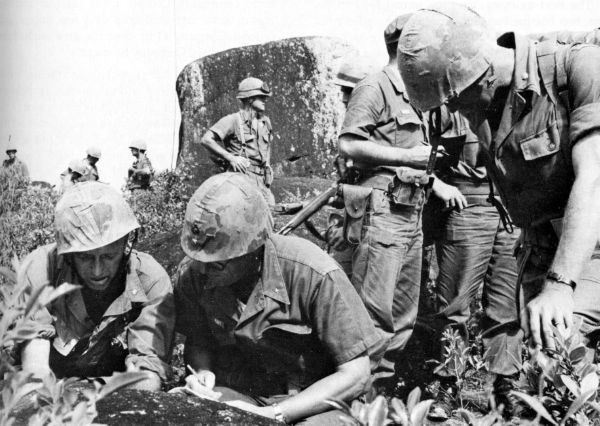
Battalion Commander LtCol Joshua Dorsey III (left) during Operation Harvest Moon.

Following Starlite, 3rd Battalion continued to conduct regular sweeps and low-level (i.e. small unit) combat operations against the Viet Cong in the greater Da Nang area. Among the casualties suffered during this period was LtCol Muir, who was killed when he stepped on an IED. In November, they participated in an amphibious operation similar to Starlite called Blue Marlin (II), which was carried out near Hoi An. Contact was irregular as the VC attempted to avoid a drawn-out engagement and the battalion only had three Marines wounded. In December, the battalion moved to the Que Son Valley for Operation Harvest Moon, preventing the VC from capturing the town. In March 1966, 3rd Battalion participated in Operation Kings, officially a search-and-destroy mission in the An Hoa region, but in actuality, the mission was an attempt to create a long-term occupation in a historic Viet Cong stronghold. However, any progress gained in Kings was immediately negated by the Buddhist Uprising one week later in Da Nang. In July, the battalion acted as a blocking force during Operation Macon but did not see significant action. In August, 3rd Battalion left Vietnam for Okinawa. The battalion would not be gone long, and in early October was stationed offshore as BLT 3/3 near the northern portion of I Corps to combat a possible North Vietnamese invasion across the Demilitarized Zone (DMZ). The threat never materialized and BLT 3/3 returned to Vietnam later that month.

=== The DMZ and Khe Sanh (1966–1967) ===
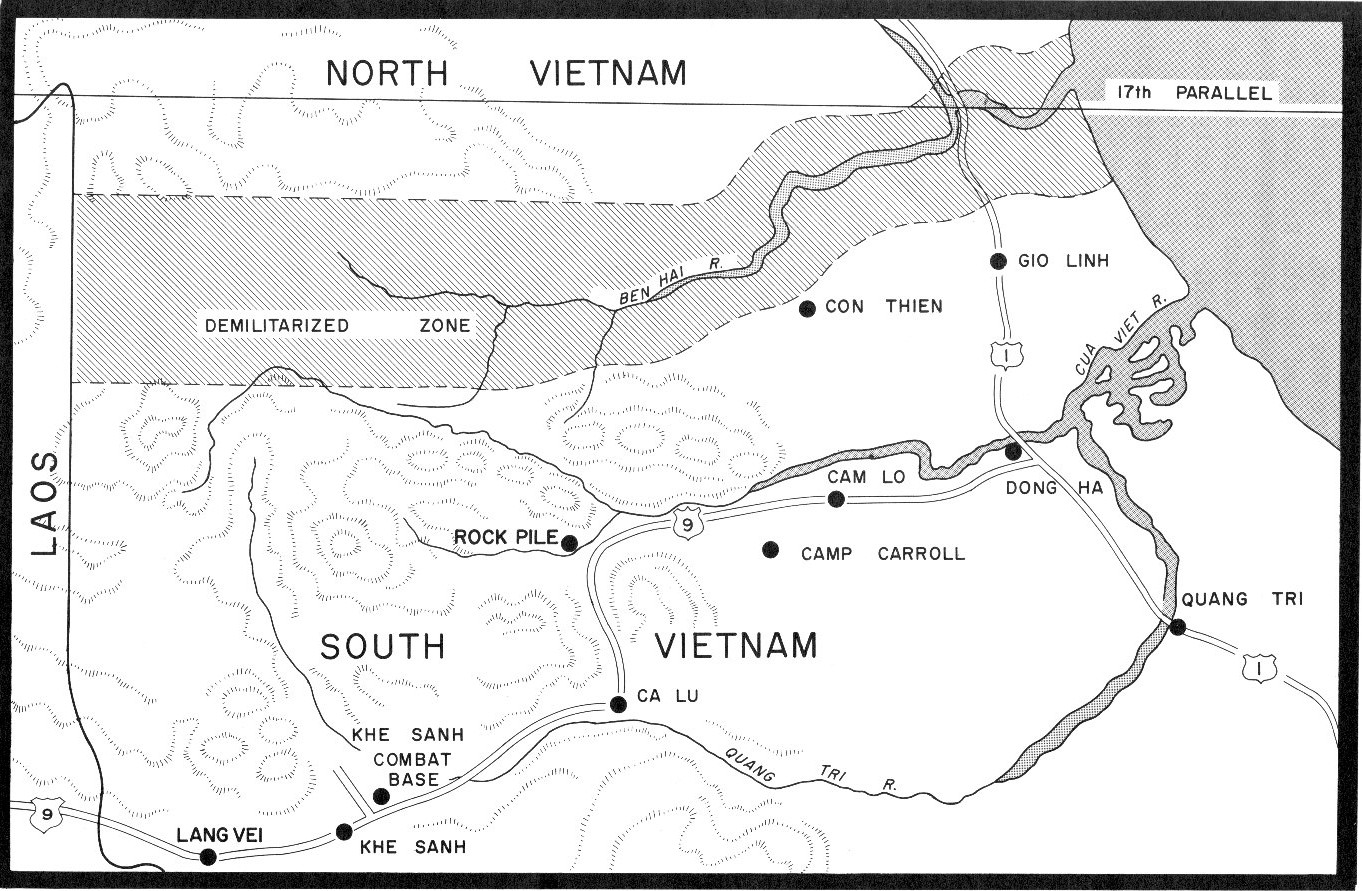
Northern Quảng Trị Province, where 3rd Battalion would operate from late 1966–1968

In October 1966, 3rd Battalion was deployed to combat the threat from the People's Army of Vietnam (PAVN) in Quảng Trị Province. This would be a largely conventional fight, known as the "war against professionals", that would continue until late 1968. Supplies were in constant short supply, and Marines were constantly scavenging helmets, clothes, armor, and ammunition from their dead. In December, the battalion experienced a case of friendly fire when a pair of F-4 Phantoms dropped several bombs in the middle of Mike Company, killing seventeen Marines and wounding a dozen others. Navy Corpsman Donald Rion was awarded a posthumous Silver Star for his efforts to treat the wounded, despite suffering a fatal wound himself. From February through April, the battalion took part in Operations Prairie II, III and IV, which were a series of sweeps throughout Quảng Trị Province. On 2 March 1967, Lima Company—then under the command of Captain John Ripley—stumbled into a PAVN regiment trying to cross the DMZ. Twelve Marines were killed and twenty-eight severely wounded with every other Marine additionally hit. The PAVN suffered heavy casualties and retreated across the border.

In April, 3rd Battalion participated in a series of bloody engagements near Khe Sanh known as The Hill Fights. Activity near Khe Sanh had increased dramatically that spring. On 24 April, Bravo Company 1st Battalion 9th Marines was engaged by elements of the PAVN 18th Regiment dug in on Hills 881 North, 881 South, and 861. 3rd Battalion—then a hybrid unit with companies from multiple battalions—was sent to assist. 3rd Battalion's commander, LtCol Gary Wilder, believed he was only facing a small PAVN unit and counterattacked. Throughout the 25th, 3rd Battalion launched a series of piecemeal attacks on the hills, only to be repulsed with heavy losses. The 3rd Marine Division committed its reserve to the fighting and took Hill 861 on 26 April. On the night of 29 April, the PAVN replaced the battered 18th Regiment with the fresh 95th Regiment. The following day the Marines dropped 250 bombs and more than 1300 artillery rounds on Hill 881. Mike Company was allowed by the PAVN to advance partially up the hill before opening fire. By the end of the battle, 46 marines from the battalion were killed, half of them from Mike Company.

Throughout the late spring and early summer of 1967, the battalion helped keep open Route 9, the supply route between Ca Lu Combat Base and Khe Sanh. After a firefight between a PAVN battalion and Mike Company in late July, the road was closed until 1968. The battalion was also stricken by malaria during this time; 206 3rd Battalion Marines contracted it. In the fall the battalion was put to work building and defending the McNamara Line, a series of fixed fortifications along the DMZ in an area known as Leatherneck Square (The four corners were Cam Lộ, Con Thien, Gio Linh and Đông Hà). The PAVN repeatedly attacked the positions and twice 3rd Battalion had to come rescue elements of 2nd Battalion, 4th Marines that were in danger of being overrun. 3rd Battalion would occupy several of those positions through May 1968. From 29 December to 12 January, elements of the battalion participated in the construction and defense of strongpoint Alpha 3.

=== Tet and Its Aftermath (1968) ===
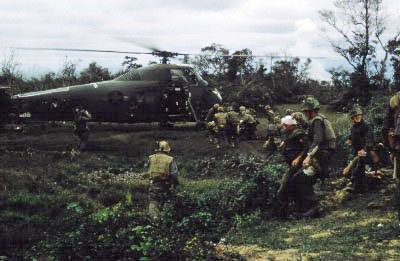
3rd Battalion conducts a Medevac while operating along the DMZ, 1968.

The first major combat for 3rd Battalion in 1968 came on 7 February, approximately a week after the Tet Offensive began, when Kilo Company engaged a PAVN battalion near Gio Linh. 29 Kilo Marines were killed, including PFC Robert Quick who was awarded a posthumous Navy Cross for deflecting a PAVN hand grenade. Another 31 were wounded, including PFC Craig Swartz, who was wounded three times and received three Purple Hearts for his service. PAVN losses numbered at least 139, with another 60 graves discovered by 3rd Battalion Marines three days later. That same month a platoon from Mike Company observed and damaged two PAVN PT-76 tanks near Alpha 3, one of only three times they were encountered during the Vietnam War before 1972. On 6 March, Mike Company blundered into the 27th Regiment of the PAVN 325th Division and had one-third of the company put out of action in an all-night engagement, including 14 Marines killed.

In early May, the PAVN launched a new offensive known as the May Offensive or 'mini-Tet'. On 8 May, 3rd Battalion overran a PAVN regimental command post in Leatherneck Square, suffering 102 casualties including 8 killed. On 22 May, Lima Company uncovered a North Vietnamese staging area near Alpha 3 and destroyed it in an action that involved elements of three other Marine battalions. Then on 26 May, the battalion was moved east to Dai Do as part of Operation Napoleon/Saline, in response to PAVN pressure on the supply lines to the 3rd Marine Division headquarters at Dong Ha. By the end of the month, 3rd Battalion had lost 53 Marines and had another 319 severely wounded, a casualty ratio of about one out of every two infantrymen in the field.

In June, the battalion was placed in reserve as a ready-reinforcement unit and consequently saw little combat. From July to September, 3rd Battalion operated all throughout the I Corps area of operations, moving its command post to ten different locations. Hundreds of Marines were also affected by cellulitis. Following President Johnson's halt of the US bombing campaign on 1 November, 3rd Battalion Marines had to watch as the PAVN brazenly pushed large convoys of men and munitions south along the Ben Hai River. In one instance, it took three days for the battalion to get approval for a single airstrike on a North Vietnamese convoy.

=== Taylor Common and Redeployment (1969) ===
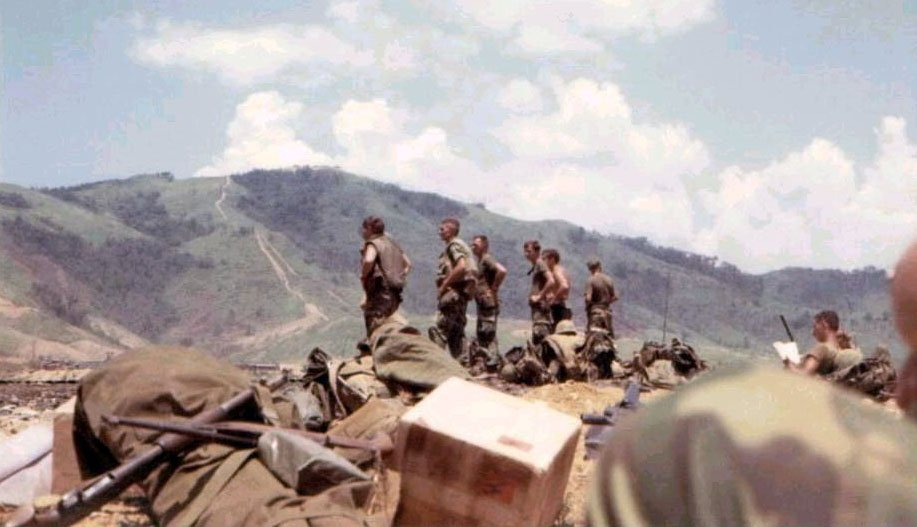
3rd Battalion 3rd Marines's command group at Vandegrift Combat Base, 1969.

In early 1969, 3rd Battalion, 3rd Marines was sent south of the DMZ for several months to join Task Force Yankee in Operation Taylor Common near An Hoa. This three-month operation focused on destroying the primary base for PAVN forces operating across several provinces and 3rd Battalion was awarded a Navy Unit Commendation for its actions during the operation. Ten Marines from 3rd Battalion were killed during the operation (out of 183 total US fatalities), and American forces captured numerous quantities of PAVN supplies. One Marine, Lance Corporal (LCPL) William R. Prom, was posthumously awarded the Medal of Honor for gallantry during Taylor Common.

In July 1969, the battalion took part in Operations Virginia Ridge and Idaho Canyon, attempting to stop infiltrators from the PAVN 27th Regiment and 33rd Sapper Battalion from coming through the DMZ. The operation continued until September, when the 3rd Marine Regiment was ordered to stop operations in preparation for its redeployment back to the United States. The battalion began to depart on 7 October and had fully arrived at Marine Corps Base Camp Pendleton by the end of 1969. Many 3rd Battalion Marines with time still left on their tours of duty were transferred to other units. 3rd Battalion spent over 1,600 days in Vietnam and conducted 48 combat operations, the most of any Marine battalion in the conflict. 653 Marines who served in 3rd Battalion, 3rd Marines were killed during the Vietnam War or killed while operating with other units. Nearly 2,800 others were wounded.

== Late Cold War (1969–1974, 1975–1990) ==
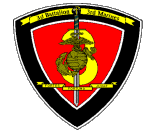
The official emblem for 3rd Battalion 3rd Marines during the 1980s and 1990s.

The battalion relocated during October and November 1969 to MCB Camp Pendleton and was reassigned to the 5th Marine Expeditionary Brigade. They were again reassigned in April 1971 to the 1st Marine Division. The battalion was deactivated 1 June 1974.

3rd Battalion, 3rd Marines was reactivated on 1 October 1975 at MCB Kaneohe Bay, Hawaii, and assigned to the 3rd Marine Division. Elements of the battalion deployed to the Western Pacific at various times during the 1970s and 1980s. In June 1979, Mike Company was deactivated and Weapons Company was stood up. In February 1980, following the Iran hostage crisis and the Soviet invasion of Afghanistan, the battalion was deployed to the Persian Gulf on board the USS Okinawa and was also the back-up force during Operation Eagle Claw. This deployment made 3rd Battalion the first American ground unit to enter the region since World War II.

In the summer of 1983, the battalion was in Mombasa, Kenya as part of the 31st Marine Amphibious Unit (MAU) (Note: When Marine battalions are deployed on-ship they are referred to as a Battalion Landing Team (BLT).) when the Joint Chiefs of Staff ordered it to the Mediterranean Sea to become part of the Multinational Force in Lebanon during the Lebanese Civil War. It arrived on 12 September and spent three weeks off the coast as a reserve force for the 24th MAU on the USS Tarawa (LHA-1). It departed on 9 October for the Indian Ocean, two weeks before the Beirut barracks bombing.

== Gulf War (1990–1991) ==
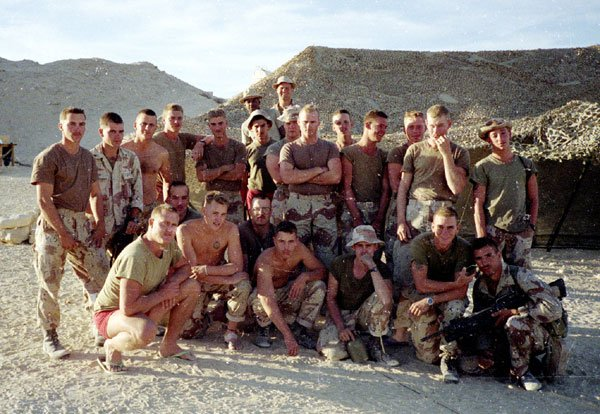
Members of India Company, First Platoon during the Desert Shield/Desert Storm deployment

=== Defending Saudi Arabia (1990–1991) ===
On 2 August 1990, 3rd Battalion was completing a deployment at Camp Hansen on Okinawa when they were notified to be prepared to immediately redeploy to Saudi Arabia as a response to the Iraqi invasion of Kuwait. No sooner had the battalion returned to Hawaii, then it was shipped out again to Saudi Arabia as part of the 1st Marine Expeditionary Brigade. India Company deployed first on 15 August to Singapore to provide onboard security for Maritime Prepositioning ships bound for the port of Al Jubayl. On 1 September, the rest of the battalion arrived in Dahran. As one of the first Marine units in country, 3rd Battalion found itself defending a key position at Cement Ridge, about 90 kilometers away from the Kuwaiti border. With orders to hold against any Iraqi attack, 3rd Battalion spent most of the months of August and September digging defensive positions. In October, 3rd Battalion and 2nd Battalion, 3rd Marines were designated "Task Force Taro" and moved to the extreme right flank of the Marine sector, bordering the King Abdul Aziz Brigade of the Saudi Arabian National Guard. Because of their close proximity, Taro was ordered to begin cross-training with the Saudi forces. This cross-training continued through January, when 3rd Battalion was moved forward to defend Al Mish'ab along the Saudi coast and became the northernmost Marine combat force in Saudi Arabia. During this time, two Marines of the battalion were accidentally killed by negligent discharges.

=== Desert Storm, Khafji, and Kuwait (1991) ===
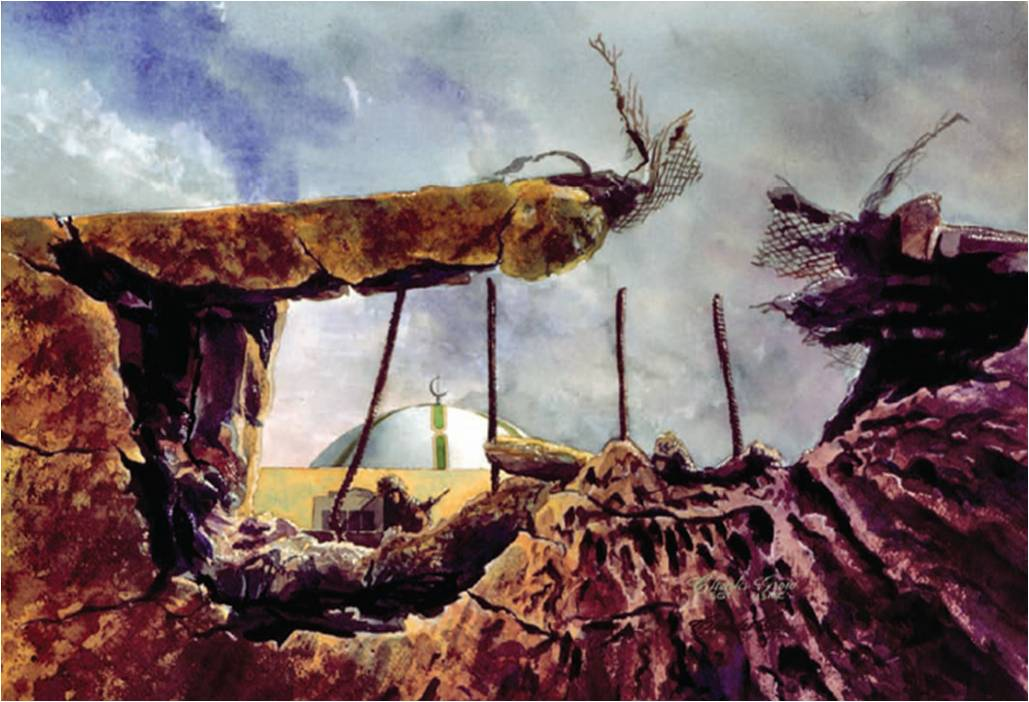
Marines of 3rd Battalion, 3rd Marines searching Khafji for Iraqi stragglers following the battle in the painting "Cleaning up Khafji".

Operation Desert Storm began on 17 January 1991, but for the first two weeks 3rd Battalion only conducted sporadic engagements with its Iraqi counterparts across the border. This changed on 29 January, when several Iraqi divisions unexpectedly crossed the border and seized the Saudi town of Khafji, less than 15 kilometers north of 3rd Battalion's position. During the attack the Executive Officer, Major Craig Huddleston, along with the Battalion Sergeant Major and part of the battalion's Heavy Machine Gun Platoon, drove into the town on a rescue mission looking for two Army soldiers who had been captured. Although they were unable to find them, the Marines from 3rd Battalion did encounter an Iraqi patrol and exchanged rounds with them before escaping. While Saudi and Qatari units ultimately retook the town, 3rd Battalion played a vital role in both coordinating air and artillery support for the attack and blocking further Iraqi advances southward. In addition, several heavy machine gun Humvees and forward air controllers (FAC's) from the battalion were attached to the Saudi Brigade and took part in the assault. From 19 to 21 February, 3rd Battalion moved from Al Mish'ab to the forward assembly areas that it would be using to launch its attack into Kuwait. It was also during this period that 3rd Battalion was given its assignment for the ground offensive. Lacking heavy armor or motorized transport, the battalion (along with 2/3) would infiltrate Iraqi positions along the Saudi border on foot in darkness and provide right flank security for the rest of the 1st Marine Division to make its assault into Kuwait. On the night of 22 February, 3rd Battalion crossed the border into Kuwait, infiltrating past Iraqi minefields, tank traps, and other obstacles. Like many American units, 3rd Battalion encountered no Iraqi resistance and the biggest threat to the Marines came from friendly fire. Throughout the ground war, the battalion advanced steadily northwards, spending an entire day traversing the burning oil fields, encountering no resistance but taking plenty of prisoners. 3rd Battalion arrived outside the Kuwait International Airport around 27 February where a SCUD missile landed near the battalion's command post. The battalion was on the grounds of Kuwait International Airport preparing to redeploy on order when the cease-fire was announced. After being trucked back south to Jubayl, on about 7 March, 3rd Battalion returned to Hawaii, having suffered no combat casualties and being the first Marine unit to return home.

== Post Cold-War (1991–2004) ==
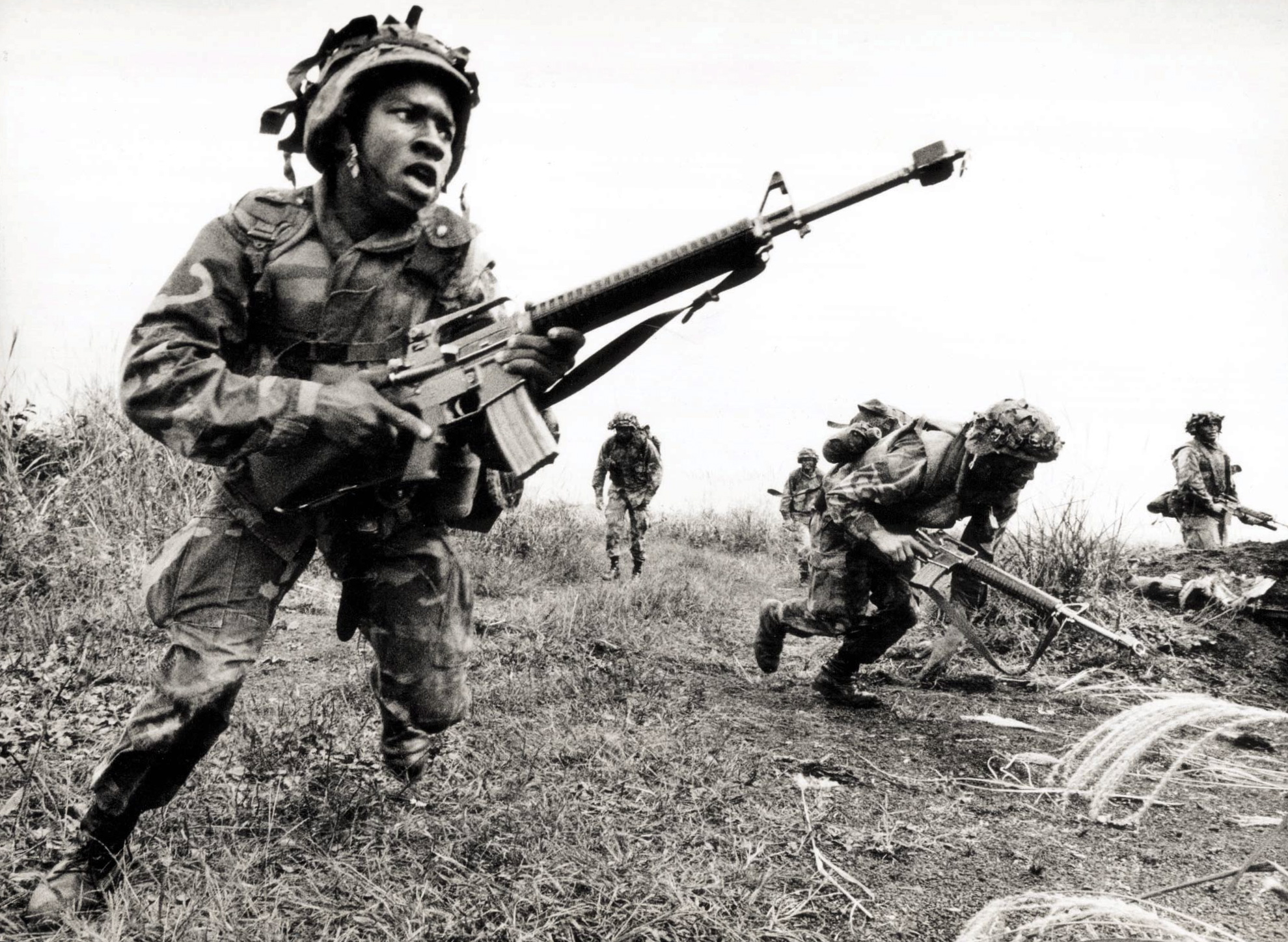
Marines from Weapons Company practice engaging an enemy force while at Camp Fuji, Japan in 1996.

Between its participation in Desert Storm and the Afghan War, 3rd Battalion conducted multiple deployments around the Pacific Rim. In August 1991 the battalion participated in Operation Tafakula in Tonga, an international exercise involving elements of the French military and the Tongan defense services. In 1992 it conducted a Unit Deployment Program (UDP) to Okinawa. In 1993 India Company participated in Operation Golden Eagle in Australia. In 1994 the battalion conducted another UDP to both Camp Hansen on Okinawa and to Camp Fuji in Japan. On 8 June India Company participated in the 50th Anniversary of the Invasion of Saipan. In October 1994 3rd Battalion was reassigned to the 3rd Marine Division. In 1995 the battalion went to Fort Wainwright, Alaska for Operation Northern Edge, then spent the latter part of the year training at Camp Fuji, Hachinoe (Umineko – Forest Light with the JGSDF) and Okinawa. The battalion sent a composite company, made up of one platoon from each company, to Australia in March 1996 to cross train with the Australian 1st Royal Australian Regiment. In 1997 it conducted another UDP to Okinawa and Pohang, Korea. Some members of the battalion were selected to augment LF Carat. In June Marines from Lima Company 3rd Platoon with augments from 1st, 2nd Platoon, and Weapons Company were recalled for JTF Bevel Edge [not executed] to evacuate American Nationals from Cambodia. During that time Weapons Company participated in Exercise Kennel Bear on Guam. Lima Company took part in Operation Valiant Mark with the 1st Guards Battalion of Singapore. In 1998 the battalion participated in Operation Southern Frontier in Australia, Kennel Bear in Okinawa, Forest Eagle/Freedom Banner in Korea, Forest Light on Kyushu, Japan, and Fuji '99.

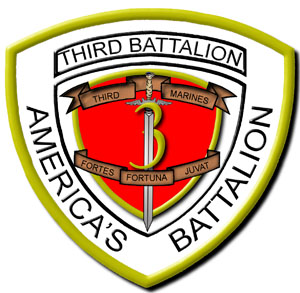
The official emblem for 3rd Battalion 3rd Marines during the global war on terror.

From 1999 to 2002, 3rd Battalion conducted operations Crocodile '99 and Tandem Thrust '01 in Queensland and Townsend, Australia, Operation Tafakula in Tonga, and then conducted UDPs to Okinawa in 2000 and 2002. In 2002 the battalion participated in Operation Millenium Edge on Tinian and Guam, then Balikatan 02–2 in the Philippines, Borneo, Brunei, Korea, Australia, and Japan. In 2003 3rd Battalion became BLT 3/3 on the 31st MEU for the second half of the year. Based on the USS Essex, USS Fort McHenry, and USS Harpers Ferry, BLT 3/3 participated in ARGEX-03 in the Philippines, provided security for President George W. Bush on Bali, Indonesia, and also visited Japan, Australia, East Timor, and Hong Kong. In May and June 2004 Lima Company participated in Operation Cobra Gold II at Khorat, Thailand and other parts of the battalion participated in Operation Northern Edge JTF-510 in Alaska. In July the battalion took part in the annual exercise of RIMPAC in Hawaii with Company C, 2nd Battalion Royal Australian Regiment on exchange. As part of the exchange, Kilo Company conducted Operation Gold Eagle in Lavarack Barracks, Townsville, Australia.

== War in Afghanistan (2004–2005, 2010–2012) ==
=== Regional Command East (2004–2005) ===
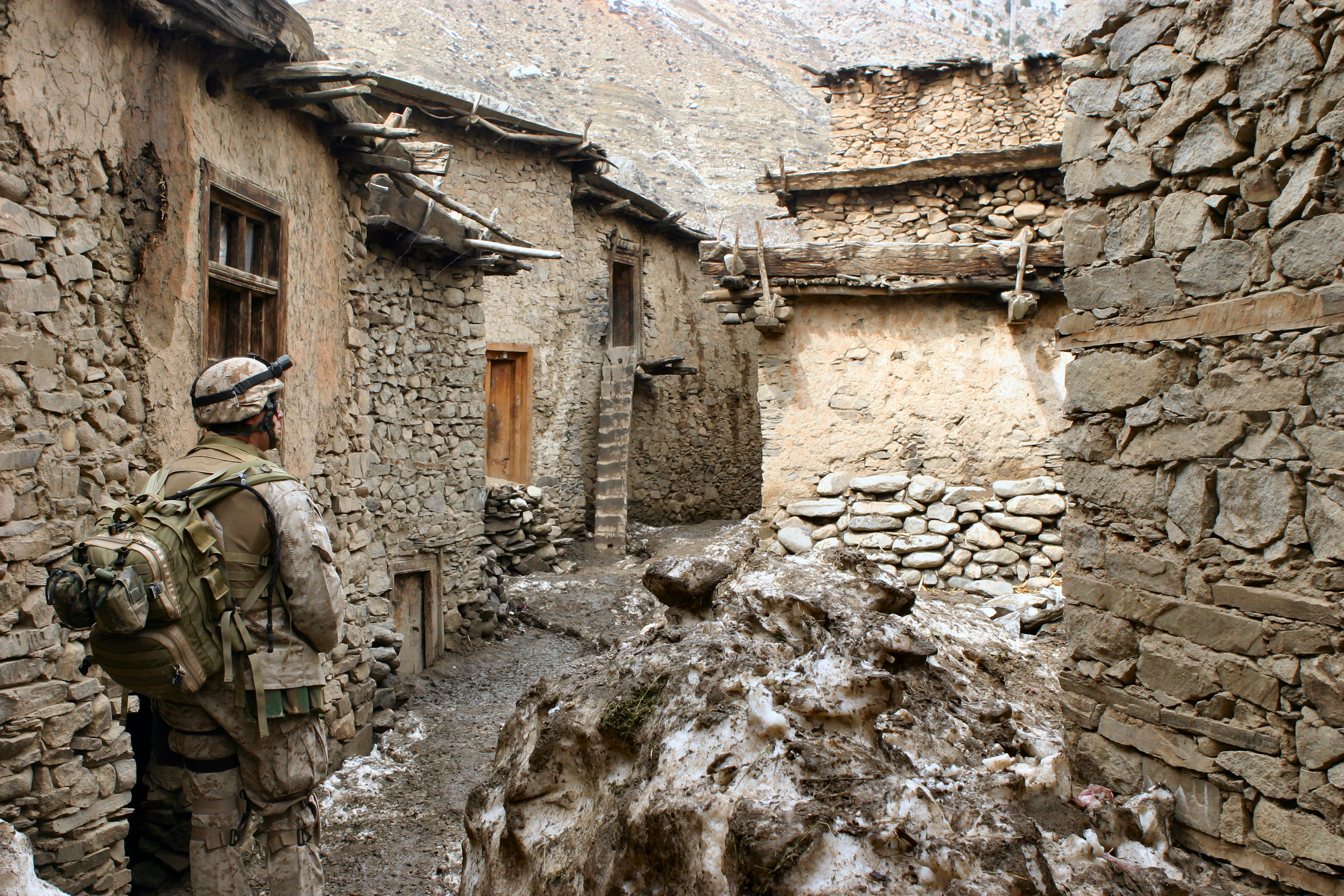
A Corpsman with Kilo Company in Afghanistan, 2005.

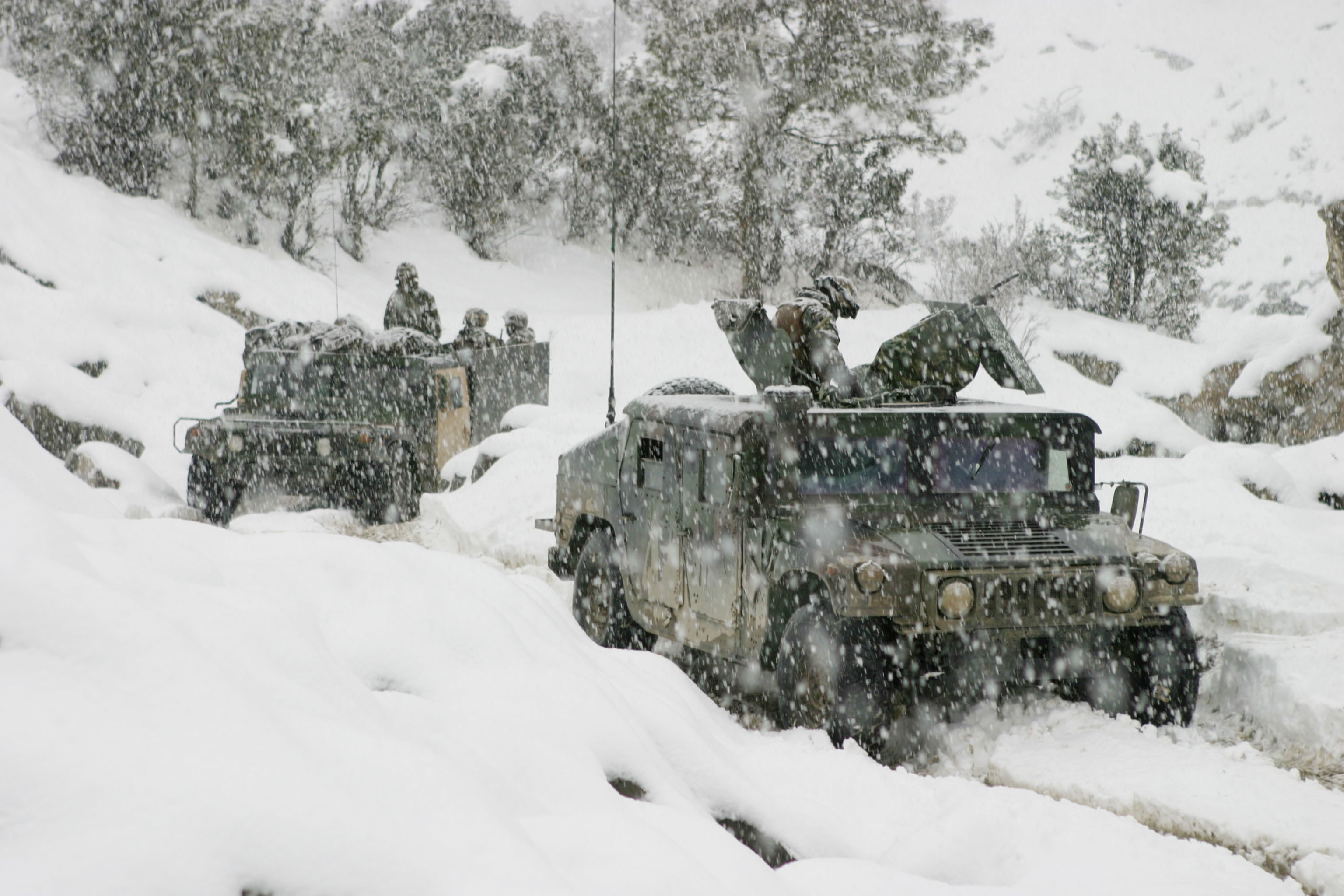
The marines conducting a mounted patrol in the cold and snowy weather of the Khost-Gardez Pass, 2004

In late 2004, 3rd Battalion was notified it would be participating in Operation Enduring Freedom. On 31 October, the first Marines left Kaneohe Bay, Hawaii for an eight-month deployment to eastern Afghanistan. While serving in Afghanistan, 3rd Battalion conducted Operation Spurs in February 2005, where they were inserted into the Korangal valley and conducted both counterinsurgency and humanitarian operations. In March, 3rd Battalion launched a similar sweep called Operation Mavericks. During their time in Afghanistan, the Marines from 3rd Battalion engaged the Taliban in 22 firefights. In one of them the battalion suffered its only fatalities for the deployment when LCPL Nicholas Kirven and Corporal Richard Schoener were killed during a three-hour firefight in Alishang which also resulted in twenty-three Taliban killed. During the fighting, Lieutenant Stephen Boada was awarded the Silver Star for calmly directing bombing runs on Taliban positions, despite having been wounded several times. In May the battalion launched one final operation, Operation Celtics, in the Tora Bora region. The operation was for the most part uneventful, although NBC news journalist Ron Allen was almost killed while traveling with Kilo Company when his Humvee ran over an IED.

=== Helmand Province (2010–2012) ===
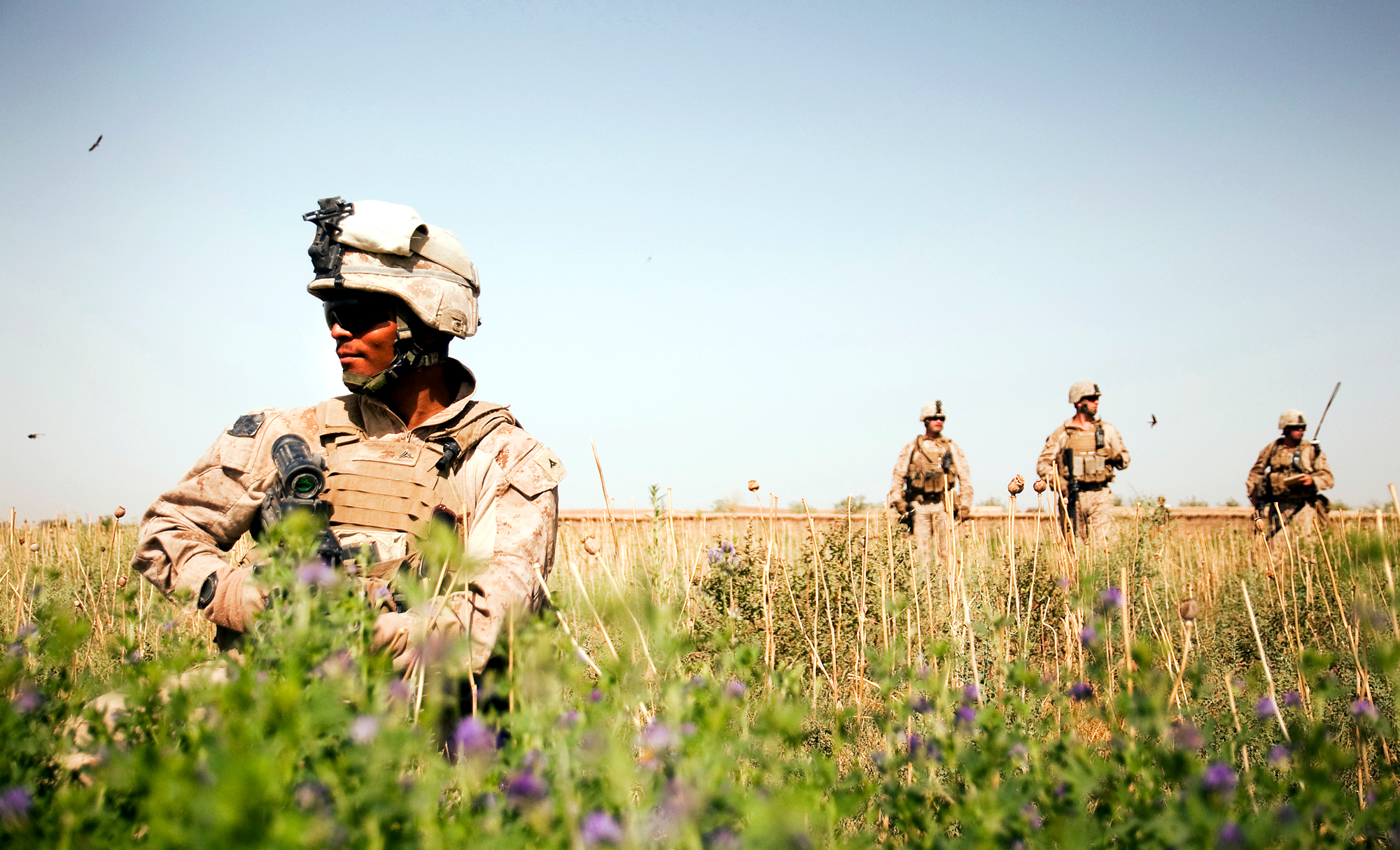
Marines with Lima Company patrolling through a poppy field in Afghanistan, 2010.

In mid-May 2010 3rd Battalion began deploying to the Nawa-I-Barakzayi District in Helmand Province, relieving the 1st Battalion, 3rd Marines. Partnering with Afghan National Army soldiers from the 215th Corps, the battalion found itself in an area awash with money as the U.S. Agency for International Development was in the process of spending $30 million in an attempt to increase agricultural production (and create jobs for thousands of otherwise-potential Taliban recruits), but was also resulting in tensions between the local community council and tribal elders. In-mid June, Lima Company took part in Operation New Dawn, establishing observation posts in southern Shosharak, an area in between Nawa and Marjeh. In late July, the battalion suffered the loss of Corporal Joe Wrighstman, who drowned in the Helmand River while attempting to save the life of an Afghan National policeman. India Company just days later had 3 squads from 3 different platoons ambushed by Taliban fighters in which they had to secure the crash site of Dealer 54, an HMLA-369 helicopter which was shot down near Lashkar Gah while flying close air support supporting a firefight at PB Meinert. India Company became involved in fierce firefights engaging the enemy at times just meters away. Throughout India Company's 7-month deployment they only called in 8 friendly evacuations after being engaged in over 92 Firefights and reported 174 enemy KIA. India Company operated out of | COP Spin Ghar | Patrol Base (PB) Jaker | PB Meinert | PB Poole | PB Skullet | PB Swenson | India Company's Marines were highly Awarded for their actions in Helmand during their operations including First Sgt. William Pinkerton awarded The Bronze Star Combat V. First Sgt. Pinkerton led the company's Marines from the front during 16 IED, 19 device, 14 cache finds and captured 6 insurgents. First Sgt. Pinkerton was first to push a squad to the Dealer 54s crash site through heavy Taliban Machine Gun fire and set up a safe perimeter to keep Taliban fighters from getting to downed pilots. Around this time, India Company conducted Operation Thresher and later Operation Mako in areas of Nawa District under heavy Taliban influence, finding several cache sites and taking some detainees. In September, while providing pre-election security for the Afghan parliamentary elections the battalion suffered another loss when 1st Lieutenant Scott Fleming was shot and killed. Nevertheless, on election day Nawa District was the one location in Helmand Province with no reported Taliban attacks. Residents claimed that the Marines from 3rd Battalion had implemented good security measures and encouraged the people to cooperate with the government, preventing the Taliban from firing a single shot. By the end of 3rd Battalion's deployment in the fall of 2010, Nawa was regarded by many as "a model of counterinsurgency operations and the most stable district" in southern Afghanistan.

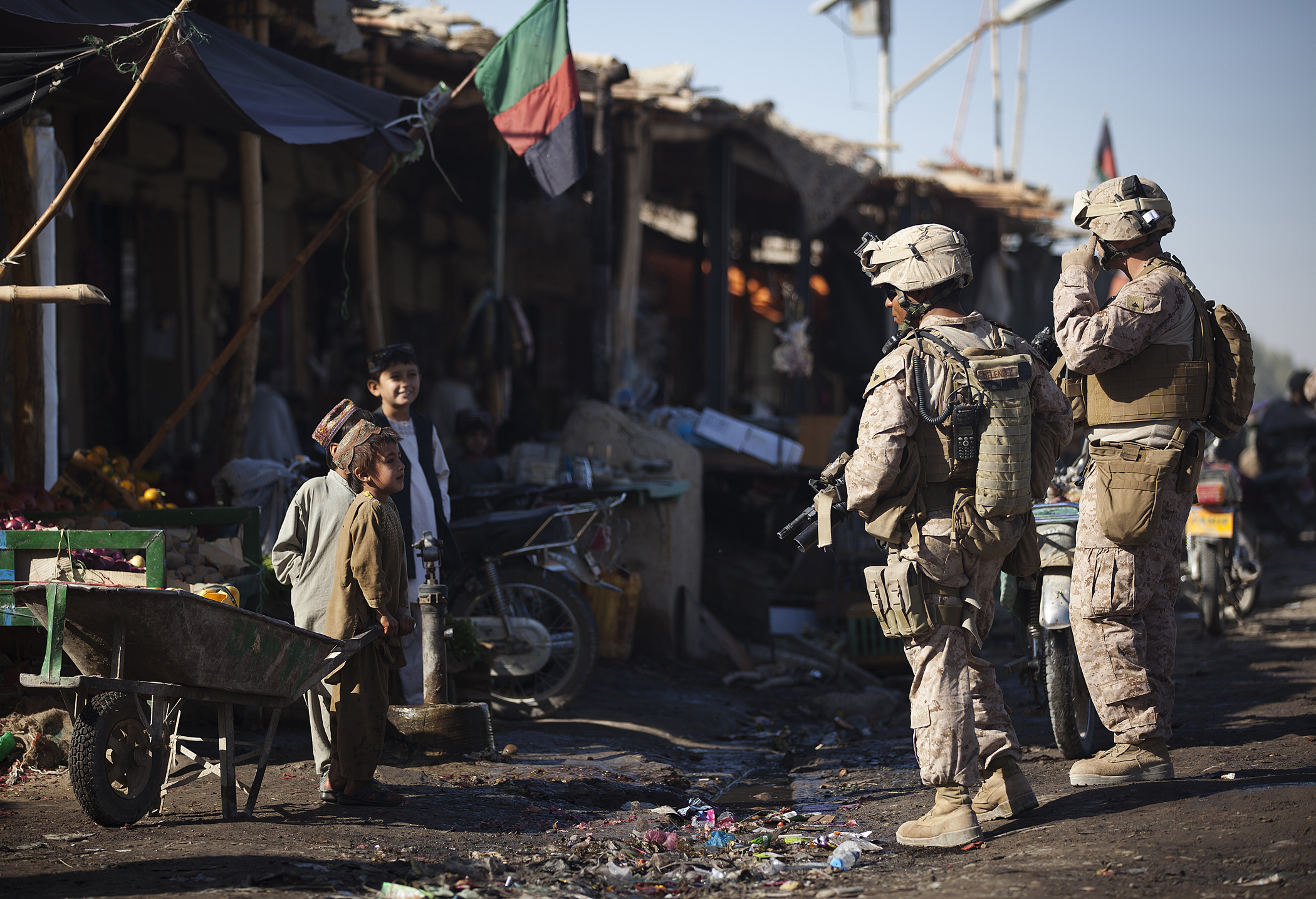
Marines from H&S Company patrolling a marketplace in Garmsir District in 2011.

In October 2011, 3rd Battalion deployed again to Helmand Province, this time to the Garmsir District. Located in southern Helmand, directly south of Nawa District, Garmsir was both a historically infiltration route for Taliban coming from Pakistan, and is considered to have a culture very similar to Pakistan's. The deployment was marred by tragedy at the very beginning when the Chief of Police, LtCol Sayfullah Khan Rashidi, (who had previously served as Nawa District's Chief of Police during 3/3's deployment there) was killed along with two other Afghan National Police (ANP) by an IED on 6 November. Two days later, Hajji Abdullah Khan, an influential tribal elder with the Nurzai Tribe in the Sar Banadar area, was gunned down by a member of the Andar Tribe following a shura with 3rd Battalion Marines. Afghan Border Police (ABP) were able to arrest the murderer, who was then successfully prosecuted under Afghan law. A Taliban commander was also killed in Meyan Pashti around the same time. In mid-December, a squad from Lima Company was able to rescue an entire Afghan family when their car plunged into the Helmand River.

Starting in January 2012, 3rd Battalion and elements of the 215th Corps of the Afghan National Army began a series of airborne assaults at sparsely-populated and historically Taliban-controlled areas in Garmsir. On 4 January they launched Operation Tageer Shamal (Shifting Winds), aimed at clearing Taliban fighters from the western side of the Helmand River. On 10 February they followed up with Shahem Tofan (Eagle Storm), a joint effort with the ABP aimed at interdicting smugglers moving through the desert in southeastern Garmsir. On 17 April, over 2,200 Afghans went to the polls to elect the Garmsir District Community Council, which – due to increases in security – now represented the entire district instead of just the northern part. Four days later, on 21 April, a suicide bomber killed four Afghan Police in Garmsir; while medevacing the police, a UH-60 Black Hawk helicopter crashed, killing all four aboard.

== Iraq War (2006–2009) ==
=== Al Anbar Province (2006–2008) ===
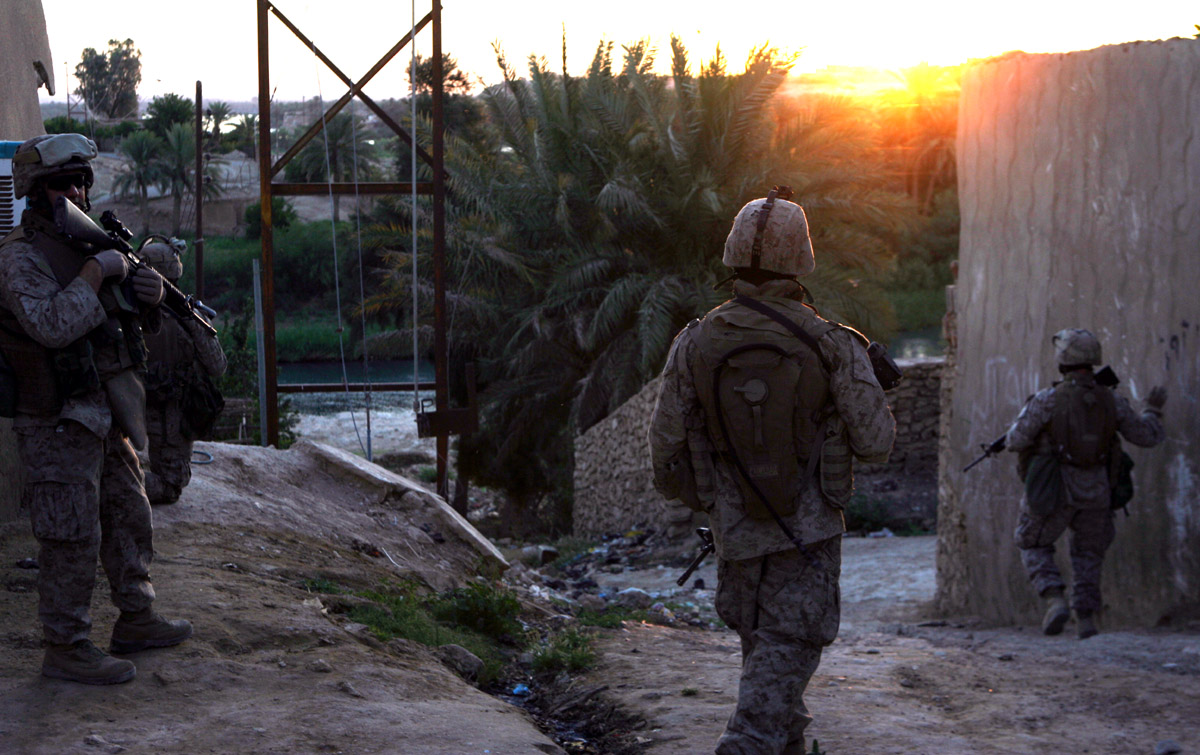
Kilo Company Marines patrolling the Haditha Triad in Iraq, 2006.

In March 2006, 3rd Battalion, 3rd Marines conducted its first Operation Iraqi Freedom deployment to Al Anbar Province in western Iraq. They relieved the 3rd Battalion 1st Marines in the Haditha area and were based out of the Haditha Dam. This deployment was particularly sensitive, coming around the same time that news of the Haditha killings (where Marines had killed 24 civilians in the same area the previous November) broke in the United States. Once it arrived in Iraq, the 3rd Battalion began the mission of "fighting insurgents, working with locals to improve local economy and quality of life, and training Iraqi soldiers." The Battalion was also partnered up with the 2nd Battalion, 2nd Brigade of the 7th Iraqi Army Division. 3rd Battalion attempted to secure Haditha by using an approach of "constant presence". The battalion operated from a series of forward operating bases in the local cities of Haditha, Barwanah, Haqlaniyah, and Baghdadi from which its rifle and weapons companies sent out constant patrols to keep the insurgent groups off balance. However, the battalion was unable to create a working local police force, due to the overwhelming intimidation by insurgent groups. Battalion Commander Lieutenant Colonel Norman Cooling observed, "We didn't have the manpower to control the [main roads] and hold Haditha. The Iraqi Army was as blind as we were. The insurgents killed anyone who spoke to us." One group of 15 police volunteers was murdered by insurgents in Baghdadi in May. Then in June a Marine mistook a local tribal leader driving near a convoy for a possible suicide bomber and killed him. Another groups of Marines in the same city had more success when they cornered a band of insurgents in the Haqlaniyah Hotel and destroyed it. By June, attacks against Marines in Haqlaniyah had become common, with their base getting mortared about twice a week and some insurgents getting close enough to throw grenades over the wall into the base. On 3 June three insurgents opened fire on the Haqlaniyah base but were quickly killed after a group of Marines led by Gunnery Sergeant Jim Lanham launched a hasty counterattack. In early September, 3rd Battalion launched a second effort to recruit police called Operation Guardian Tiger IV. This recruitment drive was more successful than its predecessors and also detained 30 suspected insurgents. This second recruitment effort succeeded in locating an individual named "Colonel Farouk," who would play a key role in the counterinsurgency campaign in the region subsequent to 3/3's departure, when the 2nd Battalion of the 3rd Marine Regiment, 3/3's sister battalion, continued counterinsurgency efforts in the area of operations. Farouk would prove critical to these continuing efforts. Al Qaeda in Iraq was ultimately defeated in the region, due in great measure to 3/3's returning Farouk, who built a robust police force during 2/3's tenure, to the Haditha region. During their time in Haditha the Marines from 3rd Battalion 3rd Marines conducted more than 8,000 patrols, located 54 weapons caches and detained more than 800 suspected insurgents. The battalion suffered 13 Marines killed and 85 wounded. On 6 October, 3rd Battalion 3rd Marines returned to Kaneohe Bay.

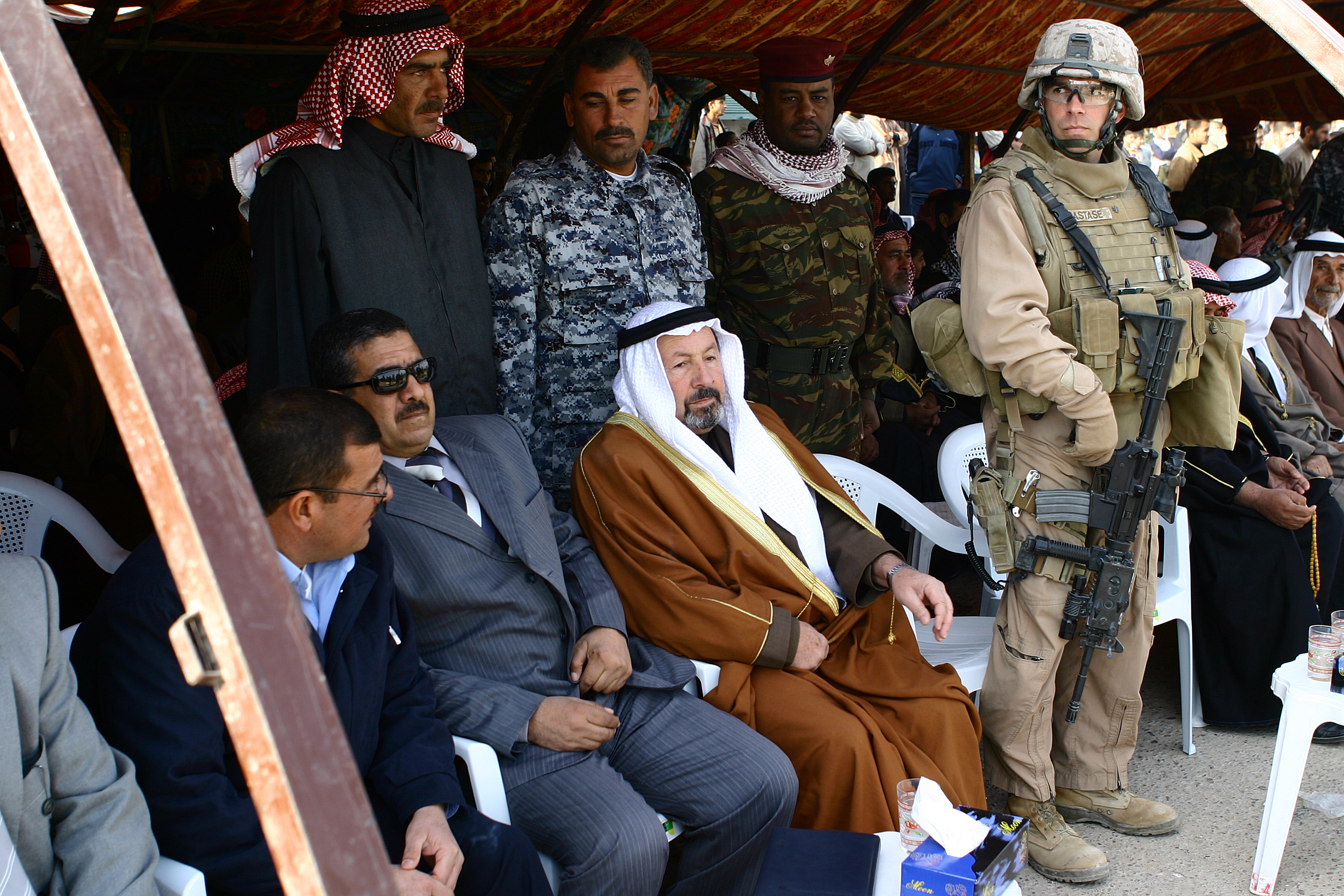
Battalion Commander LtCol Nathan Nastase with members of the Karmah City council in Iraq, 2007. Many of these individuals would be killed in June 2008 when a suicide bomber attacked the council.

The following year in August 2007, the battalion made its second Iraq deployment, this time to the Fallujah area where they served under the Regimental Combat Team 6 during the closing phases of Operation Alljah. Their mission was to complete the Clear Hold Build operation in the areas of Karmah and Zaidon which the 2nd Battalion, 5th Marines and 2nd Battalion, 7th Marines had begun two months earlier. Karmah had become an important insurgent stronghold due its proximity both Baghdad and Fallujah. Unlike other cities, Karmah had no definable perimeter to hold, making it easy for outsiders to access. In addition, as insurgents were pushed out of Baghdad by other offensives they found it easy to flee to Karmah. In early September, Kilo Company moved into a cluster of villages northeast of Karmah that was the last major insurgent staging ground in Anbar. The insurgents fled without firing a shot. For the first few months the Marines took small-arms and mortar fire nightly. A 20-minute attack on 5 October against the Iraqi Police station in Karmah was repulsed by Jim Lanham, now a First Sergeant. By late 2007 the Marines frequently found themselves mediating between sheiks, assisting locals with reconstruction projects, and mentoring the Iraqi police units in the area. One company commander, Captain Quintin Jones, observed that, "On one end I'm fighting, and on the other end I'm disputing between tribal leaders. The other part (is) trying to stimulate the economy. So, it's a three-block war here and it's very, very dynamic." The battalion spent more than $1 million on Karmah, including a city council and a medical clinic. On 1 December, the battalion staged an elaborate reopening of "Victory Circle", or "The Lollipop", the marketplace in the center of Karmah which had earlier been the scene of fierce fighting between Marines and insurgents. In February 2008 the battalion rotated back to the United States without suffering a single casualty.

=== Task Force Military Police (2009) ===
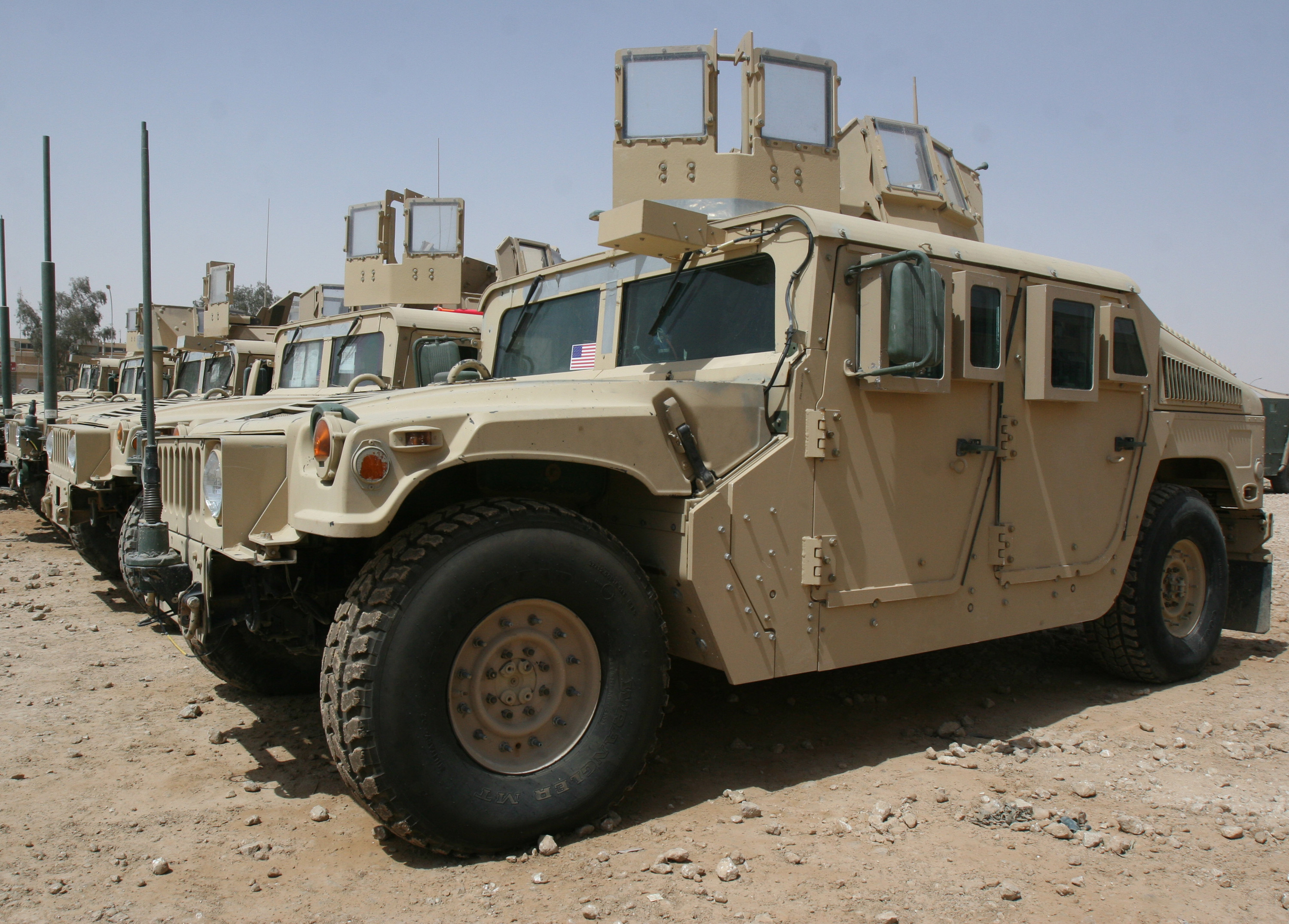
3rd Battalion Humvees staged at Al Asad Airbase as part of Task Force MP.

In April 2009 3/3 deployed for a third time to Iraq, this time to Al Asad Airbase in Al Anbar Province. On that deployment they made up Task Force Military Police (TFMP). Task Force Military Police was a support unit fulfilling security responsibilities in Anbar Province, including conducting convoy security missions and detainee releases, running regional detention facilities, and also managing the military working dogs in Anbar Province. In addition, since November 2008 it had been tasked with securing Combat Outpost Heider in Rabiah, Nineveh Province, as part of Operation Defeat Al Qaeda in the North (OPDAN). In late July, Marines from the battalion operating as Task Force Personnel Recovery participated in and were responsible for the eventual recovery of the remains of a pilot, Navy Captain Scott Speicher, who had been missing in action since the 1991 Gulf War. President Barack Obama later said he was "grateful to the Marines who pursued the information that led to Captain Speicher's recovery so that he can now come home." The deployment was mostly uneventful and 3/3 was ultimately relieved by 3rd Battalion, 24th Marines, which was the last Marine infantry battalion to deploy to Iraq. En route back to the United States one of the companies was detained in Mumbai, India for two days. The battalion lost one Marine, LCPL Ray Spencer, who died in a nonhostile incident.

With the exception of Weapons Co. who was deployed back to Fallujah under 1st Battalion 7th Marines. To assist in combat operations, and turn over to Iraq authority.

== Unit awards ==
Since the beginning of World War II, the United States military has honored various units for extraordinary heroism or outstanding non-combat service. This information is compiled by the United States Marine Corps History Division and is certified by the Commandant of the Marine Corps.

Streamer	Award	Year(s)	Additional Info
A streamer with red, gold, and blue horizontal stripes with a bronze star in the center	Presidential Unit Citation Streamer with one Bronze Star	1944, 1965–1967	Battle of Guam (Citation), Vietnam War (Citation)
A green streamer with red, gold, and blue horizontal stripes along the top and bottom with one silver star in the center	Navy Unit Commendation Streamer with one Silver Star and three Bronze Stars	1943, 1965, 1968–1969, 1990–1991, 2006, 2007–2008, 2009, 2010	Battle of Bougainville (Citation), Operation Starlite (Citation), Operation Taylor Common (Citation), Desert Storm (Citation), Iraq War, (Note: While the NUCs for the Iraq War have not been officially certified on 3/3's website, they have been listed in official Marine Corps Awards Documents: MARADMIN 0320/09 Announcement of approved Navy Unit Commendation (NUC) from May 2009 . Retrieved 25 May 2009. MARADMIN 055/12 Announcement of approved Navy Unit Commendation. Retrieved 2 February 2012. MARADMIN 056/12 Announcement of approved Navy Unit Commendation. Retrieved 1 February 2012. 057/12 Announcement of approved Navy Unit Commendation. Retrieved 2 February 2012.) Afghan War (Note: While the NUC for the Afghan War has not been officially certified on 3/3's website, it has been listed in an official Marine Corps Awards Document: I MEF (FWD) Navy Unit Commendation. Retrieved 6 September 2012.)
A green streamer with red, gold, and blue horizontal stripes and three stars in the center	Meritorious Unit Commendation Streamer with four Bronze Stars	1967–1968, 1968, 1983, 2004–2005, 2008–2010	Cam Lộ District (Citation), Quảng Trị Province (Citation), Lebanon, Afghan War (Citation), (Note: While the MUC for the Afghan War has not been officially certified on 3/3's website, it has been listed in an official Marine Corps Awards Document (MARADMIN 074/07 Awards Update) from February 2007 . Retrieved 18 April 2007.) III MEF (Citation) (Note: While the MUC for III MEF has not been officially certified on 3/3's website, it has been listed in an official Marine Corps Awards Document (MARADMIN 617/11 Awards Update) from October 2011. Retrieved 26 October 2011.)
A streamer with three horizontal red stripes and two horizontal gold stripes	Marine Corps Expeditionary Streamer	1980, 1983	Operation Eagle Claw, and Lebanon
A gold streamer with smaller red and blue horizontal stripes and four bronze stars in the center	Asiatic-Pacific Campaign Streamer with four Bronze Stars	1943–1945	Treasury-Bougainville Operation, Consolidation of Solomon Islands, Marianas Operation, Iwo Jima Operation
A red streamer with horizontal rainbow stripes along the top and bottom	World War II Victory Streamer	1942–1945	Pacific War
A red streamer with a horizontal gold stripe and three bronze stars in the center	National Defense Service Streamer with three Bronze Stars	1951–1954, 1961–1974, 1990–1995, 2001–2022	Korean War, Vietnam War, Gulf War, War on terrorism
A light blue streamer with a horizontal white stripe in the center	Korean Service Streamer	1953–1954	3rd Battalion never actually fought in Korea, but was stationed in Japan as a reserve force during the last year of the war.
A multicolored streamer with (from outer to inner) green, yellow, brown, black, light blue, dark blue, white, and red horizontal stripes	Armed Forces Expeditionary Streamer	1962	Quemoy and Matsu Islands
A yellow streamer with two green horizontal stripes on the outside and three horizontal red stripes and two silver stars in the center	Vietnam Service Streamer with two Silver Stars	1965–1969	Vietnam Defense Campaign, Vietnam Counteroffensive, Vietnam Counteroffensive Phase II, Vietnam Counteroffensive Phase III, Tet Counteroffensive, Vietnam Counteroffensive Phase IV, Vietnam Counteroffensive Phase V, Vietnam Counteroffensive Phase VI, Tet 69/Counteroffensive, Vietnam Summer-Fall 1969
A multicolored streamer with (from outer to inner) black, yellow, blue, white, red, yellow, and green horizontal stripes, with a grey horizontal stripe and two bronze stars in the center	Southwest Asia Service Streamer with two Bronze Stars	1990–1991	Defense of Saudi Arabia, Liberation and Defense of Kuwait
A multicolored streamer with (from outer to inner) green, red, black (the three colors of the Afghan flag), white, red, and white again horizontal stripes with a blue horizontal stripe in the center	Afghanistan Campaign Streamer with three bronze stars	2004–2005, 2010, 2011–2012	Consolidation I, Consolidation III, Transition I (Note: While stars have not been officially awarded to 3/3 for these phases, these are the official campaigns as determined by the Marine Corps and Department of Defense. (MARADMIN 030/12 Awards Update))
A multicolored streamer with (from outer to inner) red, white, green, white again, black (the colors of the Iraqi flag) horizontal stripes with a yellow horizontal stripe in the center	Iraq Campaign Streamer with three bronze stars	2006, 2007–2008, 2009	National Resolution, Iraqi Surge, Iraqi Sovereignty (Note: While stars have not been officially awarded to 3/3 for these phases, these are the official campaigns as determined by the Marine Corps. (MARADMIN 424/11 Awards Update))
A blue streamer with yellow, red, and white horizontal stripes	Global War on Terrorism Service Streamer	2001–present	
A gold streamer with red horizontal stripes on the outer portions and a green palm in the center	Vietnam Gallantry Cross with Palm Streamer	1965–1969	

== America's Battalion ==
According to research by the Marine Corps' History and Museum Division, the name "America's Battalion" originated in the mid-1980s when LtCol Charles Krulak was the battalion's commanding officer. It comes from the nickname "America's Team", which was used by the Dallas Cowboys. Krulak, who was a big Cowboys fan, modified the nickname to apply to 3rd Battalion. According to Krulak, at one point a friend of his sent him a letter addressed to the "Commanding Officer, America's Battalion". With nothing else on the envelope, the United States Postal Service still managed to deliver the letter properly. Krulak commented that "if the U.S. Postal Service recognized 3rd Battalion 3rd Marines as 'America's Battalion,' then they certainly must be." So from then on, he considered it 'official'. 3rd Battalion is one of two battalions to have the nickname "America's Battalion", the other being 2nd Battalion 8th Marines based out of Marine Corps Base Camp Lejeune.

== Notable 3rd Battalion Marines ==
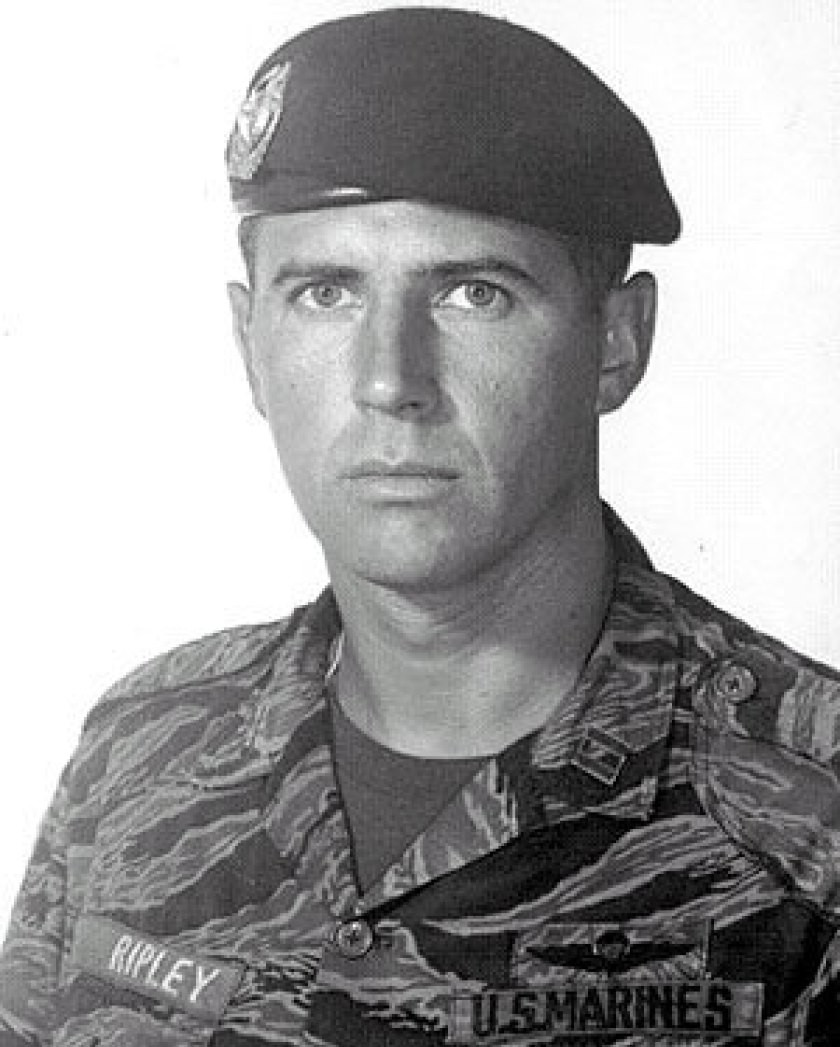
Colonel John Ripley commanded Lima Company during the Vietnam War.

Among the many decorations for valor and bravery awarded to Marines from 3rd Battalion, five Medals of Honor and over twenty Navy Crosses have been awarded. South Bend mayor John Alden Scott served in the battalion during World War II and was awarded the Silver Star on Bougainville. In 1965, Corporal Robert Emmett O'Malley from India Company became the first Marine in the Vietnam War to be awarded the Medal of Honor. Two other Marines from 3rd Battalion, 3rd Marines—Robert J. Modrzejewski (1958–1959) and Howard V. Lee (1959–1960)—would later be awarded the Medal of Honor in Vietnam while serving with other units. Colonel John Ripley (hero of the bridge at Dong Ha) was in command of Lima Company in 1967, and the company was frequently referred to as "Ripley's Raiders". One of his platoon commanders was former Major League Baseball player Chuck Goggin. Oliver North served as a platoon commander in Kilo Company from 1968 to 1969 and Frank Tejeda, a Congressman from Texas, was a Kilo NCO for the same period. In 1979, James Mattis served as commander of Kilo Company during the battalion's deployment aboard a MEU in the Indian Ocean. Charles Krulak, the 31st Commandant of the Marine Corps, also commanded Lima Company during the Vietnam War and later served as Battalion Commander from 1983 to 1985. Krulak is also credited with giving 3rd Battalion, 3rd Marines the nickname "America's Battalion". In more recent years, War on Terror alumni include Medal of Honor recipient Dakota Meyer, Navy Cross recipient Luis Fonseca, Terminal Lance creator Maximilian Uriarte, The Duffel Blog creator Paul Szoldra, and Castra Praetoria milblogger Michael Burke.

=== Notable former members ===
- Greg Pence, 1983

== See also ==
- List of United States Marine Corps battalions
- Organization of the United States Marine Corps

== Notes ==
=== Bibliography ===
- Baker, Russell (2008). "Interview with Russell Baker" (PDF). Veterans Remember Oral History Project (Interview). Interviewed by Robert Young. Springfield, Illinois: Abraham Lincoln Presidential Library. Archived from the original (PDF) on 7 November 2017.
- Darack, Ed (2009). Victory Point: Operations Red Wings and Whalers – The Marine Corps' Battle for Freedom in Afghanistan. Penguin Group. ISBN 978-0-425-22619-3.
- Frank, Benis M. (1968). A Brief History of the 3rd Marines (PDF). Washington D.C.: U.S. Marine Corps. Archived from the original (PDF) on 15 June 2011.
- Kane, Douglas T. (1963). History of U.S. Marine Corps Operations in World War II Volume II: Isolation of Rabaul. Washington D.C.: Historical Branch, Headquarters, United States Marine Corps.
- Lehrack, Otto (2005). America's Battalion: Marines in the First Gulf War. Tuscaloosa: The University of Alabama Press.
- Lehrack, Otto (1992). No Shining Armor: The Marines at War in Vietnam. Lawrence, KS: University Press of Kansas. ISBN 0-7006-0533-9.
- Lodge, Major O.R. (1954). The Recapture of Guam. Washington D.C.: Historical Branch, G-3 Division, Headquarters, U.S. Marine Corps.
- O'Brien, Cyril J. (1994). Liberation: Marines in the Recapture of Guam. Washington D.C.: Marine Corps History and Museums Division, United States Marine Corps. PCN 19000312600. Archived from the original on 13 October 2006.
- Rentz, Major John M. (1946). Bougainville and the Northern Solomons. Washington D.C.: Historical Branch, Headquarters, United States Marine Corps.
- Shaw, Henry I. Jr.; Nalty, Bernard C.; Turnbladh, Edwin T. (1966). History of U.S. Marine Corps Operations in World War II. Volume III: Central Pacific Drive. Washington D.C.: Marine Corps History and Museums Division, United States Marine Corps.
- Shulimson, Jack; Johnson, Major Charles M. (1978). U.S. Marines in Vietnam: The Landing and the Buildup 1965. Washington D.C.: U.S. Marine Corps. PCN 19000307600.
- Shulimson, Jack (1982). U.S. Marines in Vietnam: An Expanding War 1966 (PDF). Washington D.C.: U.S. Marine Corps. PCN 19000308600. Archived from the original (PDF) on 15 June 2011.
- Smith, Charles R. (1988). U.S. Marines in Vietnam: High Mobility and Standdown 1969 (PDF). Washington D.C.: U.S. Marine Corps. PCN 19000310300. Archived from the original (PDF) on 15 June 2011.
- Telfer, Major Gary; Rogers, LtCol Lane; Fleming, Jr., V. Keith (1984). U.S. Marines in Vietnam: Fighting the North Vietnamese 1967 (PDF). Washington D.C.: U.S. Marine Corps. PCN 19000309000. Archived from the original (PDF) on 15 June 2011.
