= Task & Purpose =

American military news website

- Type: Defense news publication
- Format: Website
- Owner: North Equity LLC
- Founder(s): Zachary Iscol, Brian Jones, and Lauren Katzenberg
- Editor-in-chief: James Clark
- Founded: 2014
- Headquarters: New York City
- Website: taskandpurpose.com

Task & Purpose is an American online publication founded in 2014 which covers the United States Armed Forces and the defense industry. They serve millions of readers monthly.

== History ==
Task & Purpose was founded in 2014 by Zachary Iscol, Brian Jones, and Lauren Katzenberg. The company grew out of the job board HirePurpose, and its content originally had a focus on helping soldiers transition back to civilian life.

In 2018 managing editor Adam Weinstein resigned after CEO Zachary Iscol requested that he change the title of a ProPublica investigation into undue influence over the Department of Veterans Affairs featured on the site. Weinstein contended that Iscol strongly disagreed with both the title and the factual accuracy of reporting done by ProPublica, which Weinstein felt was undue influence on the publication's editorial independence. Weinstein also said it was not the first time management, specifically Iscol, had interfered in the editorial process in trying to make the publication appealing to more conservative readers.

In October 2018, Paul Szoldra was named Editor-in-Chief. Szoldra is a United States Marine Corps veteran and the founder of the popular military satire website, Duffel Blog.

In 2019, Task & Purpose broke the story of eight United States Navy staff involved in the Eddie Gallagher trial having been awarded the Navy Achievement Medal. Following the reporting, President Donald Trump ordered the medals rescinded.

In October 2020, Task & Purpose was acquired by North Equity LLC.

In March 2021, James Clark was promoted to Deputy Editor of Task & Purpose. Clark had been with the publication for over six years. In November of 2022, Marty Skovlund Jr. was named Editor-in-Chief. Skovlund is a United States Army veteran and served with the 75th Ranger Regiment, having five combat deployments. He was among the original contributors to Task & Purpose, and was founding editor of Coffee or Die. Skovlund departed in 2024 and James Clark, who had departed Task & Purpose for Military Times, returned as the site's Editor-in-Chief.

== Significant works ==
A 2018 article titled "‘They didn’t have to kill him’: The death of Lance Corporal Brian Easley" by author Aaron Gell was later made into the film "Breaking" starring John Boyega and the late Michael K. Williams.

== Contributing authors ==
More than 500 contributing authors have published work in Task & Purpose, comprising a mix of active and retired military personnel, as well as civilians. Notable authors who have contributed to Task & Purpose include former President Barack Obama and the late Senator John McCain.

== See also ==
- Defense News
