= Norman Cooling =

United States Marine Corps general

Norman Lee "Norm" Cooling
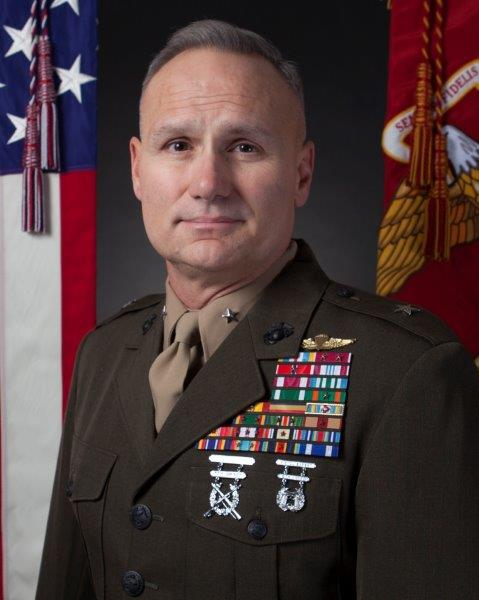
- Brigadier General Norman "Norm" Cooling
- Born: Norman Lee Cooling; 1964 (age 61–62); Baytown, Texas, U.S.
- Allegiance: United States of America
- Branch: United States Marine Corps
- Service years: 1986–2019
- Rank: Brigadier general (retired)
- Commands: Marine Corps Mountain Warfare Training Center; 3d Battalion, 3d Marines (OEF & OIF); Company A, 2d Light Armored Reconnaissance Battalion
- Conflicts: Iraq War / Operation Iraqi Freedom; War in Afghanistan / Operation Enduring Freedom; Operation Allied Force (Yugoslavia); Operation Sharp Edge (Liberia); Operation Nimrod Dancer (Panama)
- Awards: Defense Superior Service Medal; Legion of Merit with three gold award stars

Norman Lee "Norm" Cooling is a retired Brigadier General in the United States Marine Corps, who most recently served as the Assistant Deputy Commandant for Plans, Policies & Operations, Headquarters, United States Marine Corps and who previously served a number of roles during deployments in support of Operation Enduring Freedom in Afghanistan and Operation Iraqi Freedom, notably as the battalion commander of 3rd Battalion, 3rd Marine Regiment.

== Early life ==
Cooling was born in Baytown, Texas on August 26, 1964 and was adopted and raised from birth by his aunt and uncle. He was an Eagle Scout with three palms.

== Education ==
Cooling attended Robert E. Lee High School in Baytown, Texas. During this time he was a member of the Junior ROTC program, where he served as the Corps of Cadets Commander. Cooling graduated high school in 1982. He then attended the U.S. Naval Academy, graduating in 1986. He graduated 20th in his class (of over 1,000) overall. He graduated first in his class for graduates selecting to serve in the U.S. Marine Corps, for which he received the National Society, U.S. Daughters of 1812 Award (a Mameluke sword). As a Burke and Cox Scholar, he completed the Russian Language Program at Norwich University after graduating from the Academy. He received the Colonial Daughters of the 17th Century Silver Plate Award for the highest ranked graduating history major. He then completed The Basic School with honors in 1987 before attending the Infantry Officer Course, at Quantico, VA. He attended the Marine Corps Command and Staff College in 2000, graduating with distinction while earning a master's degree in Military Studies. He graduated from U.S. Naval War College on 20 June 2008, earning a Master of Arts in National Security and Strategic Studies and graduating with honors.

== Military career ==
Brigadier General Cooling served for more than 33 years in the United States Marine Corps. During this tenure, he deployed 11 times, including multiple combat tours as an infantry commander and operations officer. Cooling's primary Military Operational Specialty (MOS) was as an infantry officer (0302) until his promotion to Colonel, when he was assigned an 8041, Colonel, Ground MOS. He received his 8003, General Officer MOS upon being promoted to his current rank. His first assignment as an infantry officer was with Second Battalion, Fourth Marines where he commanded rifle, weapons, and anti-armor platoons. Subsequently, he has commanded infantry and light armored reconnaissance units to the battalion level as well as the Marine Corps Mountain Warfare Training Center in Bridgeport, CA. He commanded Third Battalion, Third Marines during combat deployments to both Afghanistan during Operation Enduring Freedom and Iraq during Operation Iraqi Freedom 5. During 3/3's Afghan tour, the battalion deployed to Regional Command-East, which included the restive Kunar Province. Operations included ones in and around the Korangal Valley, including Operations Celtics and Spurs. Notably, 3/3 forced the surrender of a key regional high value target, a man named "Najmudeen," who dwelled in the Korangal Valley and was responsible for significant anti-coalition militia activity. Cooling, along with the battalion's operations officer and intelligence officer, and others, developed Operation Stars, which would be passed to their sister battalion, the 2nd Battalion of the 3rd Marine Regiment when 2/3 relieved 3/3 in the spring of 2005. The "shell" of Operation Stars that 3/3 developed would be renamed Operation Red Wings and changed considerably. Operation Stars was to be a conventional forces-centric operation. Red Wings became a special operations forces-centric operation for the opening phases.

Cooling was one of only a handful of commanders throughout the Global War on Terror to hold command of a battalion from pre-deployment training for Operation Enduring Freedom, then command throughout the deployment to Afghanistan, then go through pre-deployment training for Operation Iraqi Freedom and command through the Iraq deployment. After 3/3's deployment to Afghanistan, the battalion, under Cooling's leadership, undertook their pre-deployment training for a deployment to the Haditha Triad region of western Iraq's Al Anbar Province. During their time in the Haditha Triad region, the Marines of 3/3 conducted more than 8,000 patrols, located 54 weapons caches and detained more than 800 insurgents and suspected insurgents. Among notable achievements during 3/3's time in the Haditha Triad was the locating of a man named "Colonel Farouk." The Marines of the battalion returned Colonel Farouk to the city of Haditha, his home, where he began rebuilding a police force with aid and assistance from Marines of 3/3 and then 2/3. Farouk would be a critical reason for ultimate success in the Triad over Al Qaeda in Iraq. Another key accomplishment of 3/3's time in the triad was the bolstering of the capabilities of the Iraqi Army in the region. When 3/3 arrived, units of the Iraqi Army in the area under Marine Corps supervision conducted operations under a "partnered squad" construct, meaning that the Iraqi Army could not conduct independent operations at the squad level. Upon completion of their tour, the Iraqi Army in the region could conduct independent battalion level operations, a significant increase in capabilities.

Cooling's notable staff assignments include serving as the Deputy Marine Liaison Officer to the U.S. House of Representatives; Director of the 31st Commandant of the Marine Corps’ Staff Group; Executive Assistant to the North Atlantic Treaty Organization's Supreme Allied Commander of Europe; Operations Chief for Regional Command Southwest (Afghanistan); Chief of Staff, II Marine Expeditionary Force; Deputy Commander, United States Marine Forces Europe & Africa; Deputy Director, J-3 Plans & Operations for the U.S. European Command in Stuttgart, Germany and legislative assistant to the 37th Commandant of the Marine Corps.

== Published works ==
Cooling is the author of a number of professional military articles, notably ones published in the Marine Corps Gazette, including "Hue City 1968: Winning the Battle While Losing the War," published in the July 2001 issue and "Creating the Conditions to Win the Street Fight," published in the January 2002 issue. Cooling also contributed, as part of the Commandant's Staff Group, to a number of works published by General Charles C. Krulak, 31st Commandant of the Marine Corps.

== Awards and decorations ==

1st row	Defense Superior Service Medal		Legion of Merit with three gold award stars	
2nd row	Bronze Star Medal with one gold award star	Defense Meritorious Service Medal	Meritorious Service Medal	Joint Service Commendation Medal
3rd row	Navy and Marine Corps Commendation Medal	Navy and Marine Corps Achievement Medal with one gold star award star	Combat Action Ribbon with one gold award star	Navy Presidential Unit Citation
4th row	Joint Meritorious Unit Award with two bronze oak leaf clusters	Navy Unit Commendation with two bronze service stars	Navy Meritorious Unit Commendation with two bronze service stars	Marine Corps Expeditionary Medal with one bronze service star
5th row	National Defense Service Medal with one bronze service star	Afghanistan Campaign Medal with three service stars	Iraq Campaign Medal with one service star	Global War on Terrorism Expeditionary Medal
6th row	Global War on Terrorism Service Medal	Navy Sea Service Deployment Ribbon with two silver service stars	Navy and Marine Corps Overseas Service Ribbon with one bronze service star	NATO Medal for Service with ISAF
Badges	Rifle Expert Badge (7th Award)		Pistol Expert Badge (9th Award)	
