= Terminal Lance =

Satirical comic strip about U.S. Marine Corps life

- Author: Maximilian Uriarte
- Website: terminallance.com
- Current status/schedule: Active
- Launch date: January 5, 2010
- Publisher: Self-Published
- Genre(s): Humor, Satire, Military

Terminal Lance is a comic strip and website created in 2010 by Maximilian Uriarte that satirizes United States Marine Corps life. Uriarte publishes the strip in the Marine Corps Times newspaper and on his own website, TerminalLance.com. The name is a slang term for a Marine who finishes an enlistment (i.e. terminates) as a lance corporal (E-3). The system for advancement, "cutting scores" which would lead to corporal, sergeant, and higher, is heavily dependent on career-field and seniority—this leads to a large number of "terminal lances" in infantry specialties who might, in another field, have advanced to NCO rank. According to Uriarte, he created the strip "to poke fun at the Marine Corps, much like Gunny Wolf in Charles F. Wolf Jr.'s old Sempertoons, but with an emphasis on the grunt Lance Corporal’s point of view."

== History ==
=== Graphic novel ===
In 2016, Terminal Lance creator Maximilian Uriarte independently released the 290-page graphic novel Terminal Lance: The White Donkey which he wrote and illustrated. The book was independently published on February 1, 2016, after a successful Kickstarter in 2013. Shortly after, the book was picked up by Little, Brown and Company and retitled The White Donkey: Terminal Lance, and was released on April 19, 2016. Maximilian's second full length graphic novel, Battle Born: Lapis Lazuli was published on July 28, 2020 by Little, Brown & Co.

=== Author ===
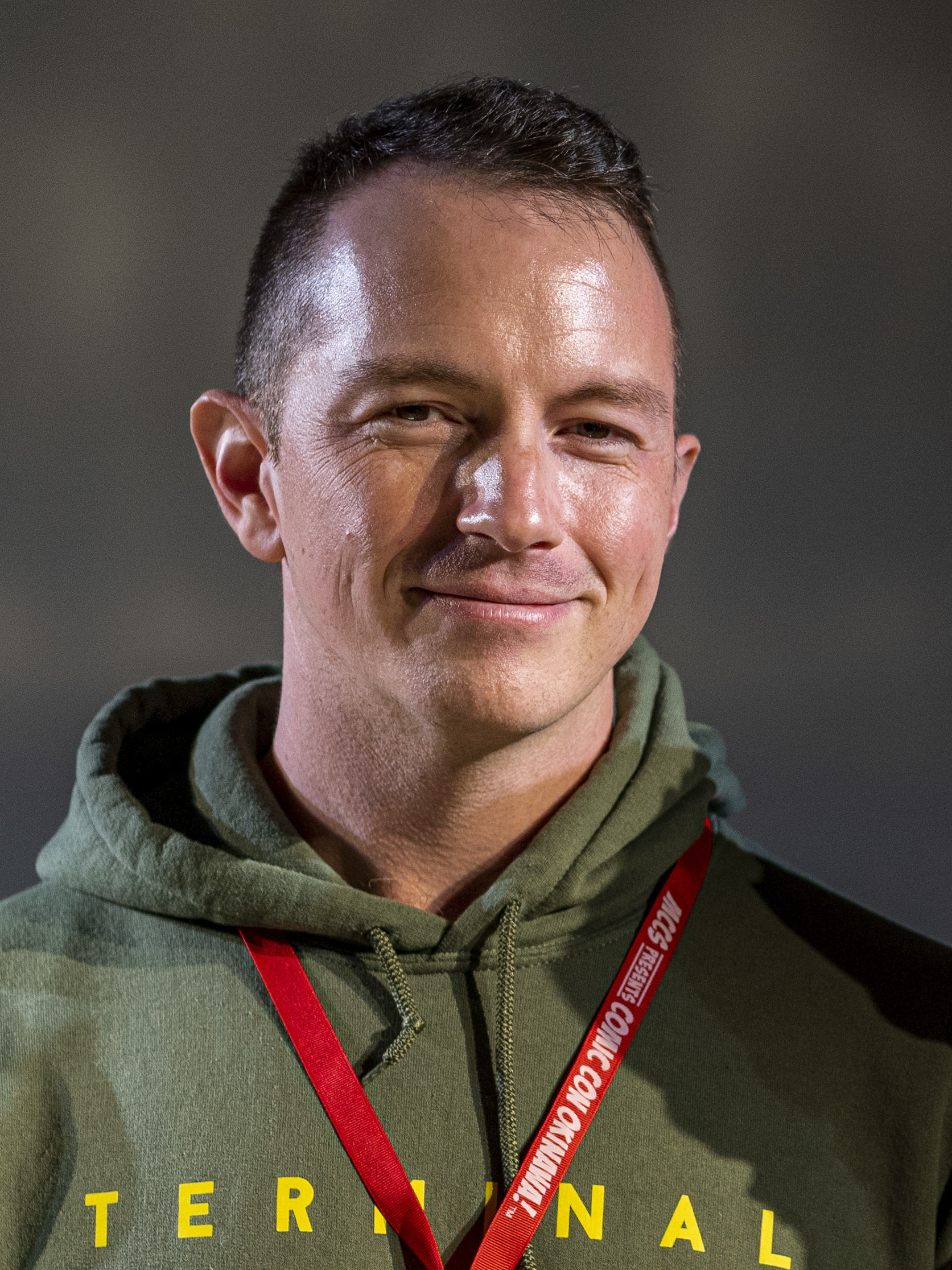
Uriarte at Comic Con Okinawa 2022

Maximilian Uriarte is an American artist, comic writer, graphic novelist, and honorably discharged Marine.

He was born in Corvallis, Oregon, to American parents of Jewish and European Mexican descent. He spent most of his childhood in Corvallis before moving to Portland, Oregon at the age of 16. After graduating high school and taking two years of general education classes at Portland Community College, Uriarte enlisted in the United States Marine Corps at the age of 19 as an 0351 Assaultman. He served from 2006 to 2010, achieving the rank of Lance Corporal and fulfilling various roles, including SMAW Gunner, Team Leader, Squad Leader, MRAP Turret Gunner, Combat Photographer, and Combat Artist. He served two tours in the Iraq War as part of the 3rd Battalion, 3rd Marines, the first in 2007-2008 (in the Al Zaidan region) and the second in 2009. He began writing and drawing Terminal Lance soon after returning. Ironically, Uriarte, who had spent most of his enlistment as a Lance Corporal found that he had been promoted to Corporal several months after his discharge. Uriarte made light of this, joking that the Marine Corps had "had the last laugh here, promoting the creator of Terminal Lance–of all people–I’m sure someone behind a desk had a laugh about it".

After ending his service in May 2010, Uriarte transferred his community college credits and (using the G.I. Bill) enrolled in the California College of the Arts, a top-ranked private art, design, architecture, and writing school in Oakland, California. He graduated in 2013, earning a Bachelor of Fine Arts degree with a major in Animation. Currently he lives with his wife in Burbank, California, where he works as a writer and artist full time.

== In popular culture ==
- On May 30, 2012, The Duffel Blog ran a satire piece stating that the creator of the Terminal Lance strip was not Maximilian Uriarte, but instead was Carlton Kent—the former Sergeant Major of the Marine Corps. The article joked that Kent had said he created the strip in order to reach out to junior Marines in better ways.
- Terminal Lance is widely read among Marines, other branches of the U.S. military, and civilians alike, with former Marine General James Mattis even acknowledging that he reads the comic.

== See also ==
- Willie and Joe
