= Operation Defeat Al Qaeda in the North =

2008 military operation

Operation Defeat Al Qaeda in the North or OP DAN was an operation conducted by Marines, A co. 2/504th Infantry Regiment of the 82nd Airborne Division, an attachment of the 101st Airborne Division, MWSS 172 Iraqi security forces in 2008 in Al Anbar Governorate, Saladin Governorate, and Nineveh Governorate to hunt down and rid the Northern part of Iraq of insurgents. It was known that the desert north of Lake Tharthar was being used by insurgents to move weapons, munitions, and foreign fighters from Syria to Mosul. During Spring and Summer of 2008, a task force of Marines and paratroopers established a base of operations in the desert to the north of the lake and conducted patrols of the surrounding area to break the supply lines. The US forces managed to locate and destroy a large number of explosives and weapons, as well as kill or capture known enemy combatants. In the process, A co. 2/504th PIR conducted the first company-sized operation using the Bell Boeing V-22 Osprey. As these operations continued, Iraqi Army outposts were built and staffed, allowing for the Iraqi Army to assume the US forces' duties in Fall 2009.

== See also ==
- Iraqi insurgency (2003–2011)
