= John Alden Scott =

American businessperson, journalist, and politician

23rd Mayor of South Bend, Indiana
- In office 1952–1956
- Preceded by: George A. Schock
- Succeeded by: Edward F. Voorde

Personal details
- Born: March 11, 1916 Litchfield, Connecticut, U.S.
- Died: October 1, 1986 (aged 70) Cocoa Beach, Florida, U.S.
- Party: Republican
- Education: University of Notre Dame
- Occupation: Marine, politician, journalist

John Alden Scott (March 11, 1916 – October 1, 1986) was a president of the Gannett Foundation from 1976 to 1981. Scott later served as chairman of the board after his retirement, and served in that capacity until three months before his death.

Scott was born in Litchfield, Connecticut. His family moved to South Bend, Indiana, in 1928, where he attended public schools. He graduated with honors from the University of Notre Dame in 1938, receiving his degree in English. He was briefly a teacher and a school administrator prior to World War II.

While at Notre Dame Scott joined the Marine Corps Reserve, and received a commission as a second lieutenant. He was called to active duty prior to the outbreak of the war. He served with the 3rd Marine Division and saw action during the Bougainville and Guam campaigns. He received the Silver Star, Bronze Star with valor clasp, and the Purple Heart. Scott was called to active duty during the Korean War, serving in Washington, D.C., as a public relations officer. He retired from the Marine Reserves with the rank of brigadier general in 1959.

Following his service in the Korean War, Scott was elected mayor of South Bend. He served from 1952 to 1956.

Scott began his journalism career with the South Bend Tribune. He joined Federated Publications and published their newspapers in Lafayette, Indiana; Boise, Idaho; and Olympia and Bellingham, Washington. When Federated Publications merged with the Gannett Company, Scott was named publisher of the Honolulu Star-Bulletin and president of Gannett Pacific. After four years Scott was named president of the Gannett Foundation (now known as The Freedom Forum), which at the time was ranked one of the largest foundations in the country.

Scott was a prolific speaker, delivering lectures on more than fifty campuses and 100 cities nationwide. He also wrote extensively for papers and magazines.

In 1983 he was inducted into the Indiana Journalism Hall of Fame.

Scott died on October 1, 1986, at his home in Cocoa Beach, Florida. At roughly the time of his death civic leaders were breaking ground for a waterfront pavilion at Cape Canaveral Hospital that was to be named in his honor.
