= Duffel Blog =

American military news satire organization

- "The American Military's Most-Trusted News Source"
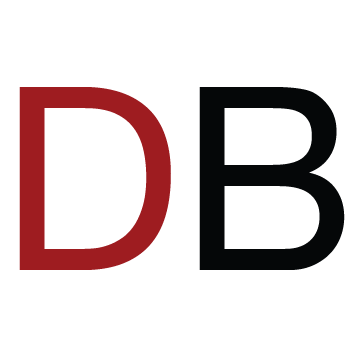
- Type: US military parody news organization
- Format: Digital
- Founder: Paul Szoldra
- Editor-in-chief: Paul Szoldra
- Staff writers: Various
- Founded: 2012
- Website: duffelblog.com

Duffel Blog is an American military news satire organization featuring satirical articles reporting on national security and US military topics. It is often described as "the military version of The Onion." It was founded in March 2012 by Marine veteran Paul Szoldra, originally as a way to drive web traffic to the now defunct website CollegeVeteran.com.

It eventually branched out and became its own entertainment website. The site has a following among civilians, veterans, and servicemen alike. As of 2012, the blog had over 300,000 fans on Facebook and about 40,000 Twitter followers.

Among their spoof articles is one suggesting a speech by the commanding general of Fort Benning resulted in a deadly riot, and another that said uncounted military absentee ballots would have resulted in Mitt Romney winning the 2012 US Presidential Election. In November 2012, the site launched an online petition to the White House to lift the services' bans on hands in pockets.

The website counts retired Marine General James Mattis, the subject of several Duffel Blog posts, as a fan. It has also received praise from former Pentagon spokesman George E. Little, various national security journalists, and Scott Dikkers, the founding editor of The Onion.

In 2017, Duffel Blog published Mission Accomplished: The Very Best of Duffel Blog, which included a hundred of the best Duffel Blog stories, hand-picked by contributors, along with additional commentary from creator, Paul Szoldra, and a foreword by Terminal Lance creator Maximillian Uriarte.

== Mistaken for truth ==
An article about Guantanamo detainees getting GI Bill benefits resulted in a formal inquiry by U.S. Senator Mitch McConnell. The letter from McConnell's office to the Pentagon leaked in 2013, generating national headlines and subjecting the senator to mockery on cable news.

The site drew attention in March 2021, when during a congressional hearing on extremism in the US military, US representative Pat Fallon made the false claim that the Southern Poverty Law Center (SPLC) had included the American Legion and the Veterans of Foreign Wars on their list of American hate groups. SPLC chief of staff Lecia Brooks noted that this claim had originated in a Duffel Blog satirical article that had appeared on the site in March 2021.

== See also ==
- List of satirical magazines
- List of satirical news websites
- List of satirical television news programs
