= I Corps (South Vietnam) =

Corps of the South Vietnamese Army

- Quân đoàn I
- Active: 1957–1975
- Disbanded: 30 March 1975
- Country: South Vietnam
- Branch: ARVN
- Type: Corps
- Garrison/HQ: Quảng Trị Province; Thừa Thiên-Huế Province; Quảng Nam Province; Quảng Tín Province; Quảng Ngãi Province
- Mottos: Bến Hải Hưng Binh, Tiên Phong Diệt Cộng (Fervent Soldiers of Bến Hải, Pioneers in Destroying the Communists)
- Engagements: Vietnam War: 1971 Operation Lam Son 719; 1972 Easter Offensive; 1975 Spring Offensive

Commanders
- Notable commanders: Trần Văn Đôn; Nguyễn Chánh Thi; Đỗ Cao Trí; Hoàng Xuân Lãm; Ngô Quang Trưởng

Insignia
- Division flag

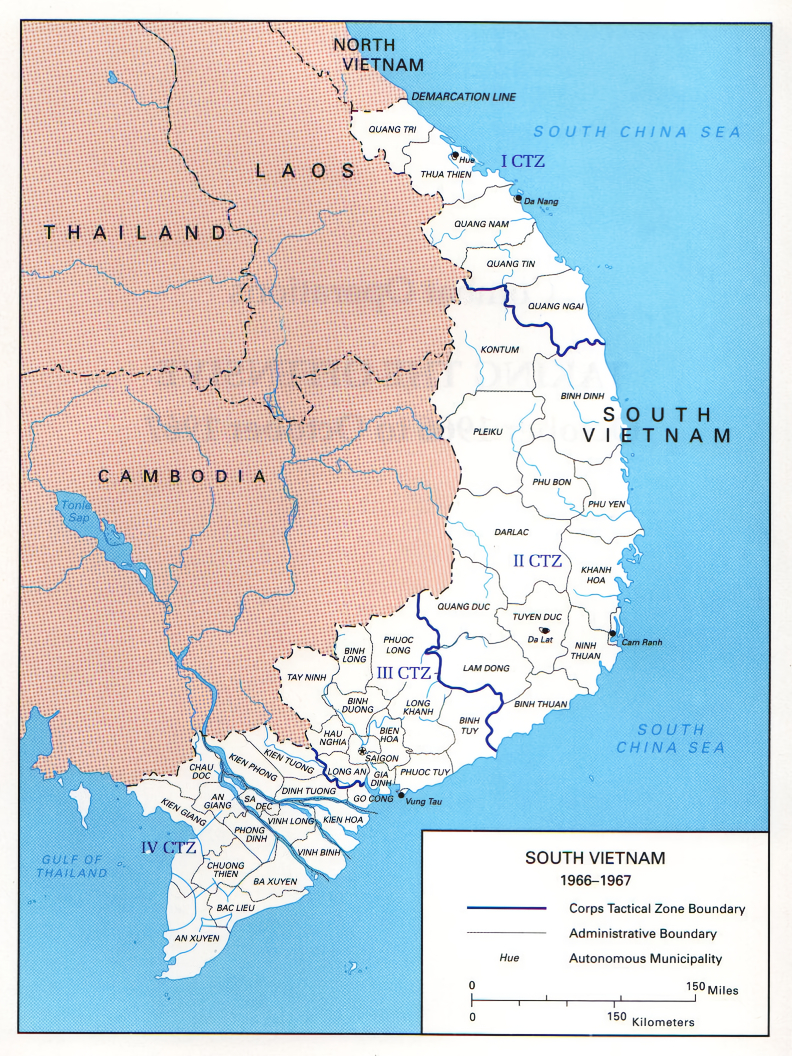
Map depicting the military regions of South Vietnam including the I Corps/I CTZ area

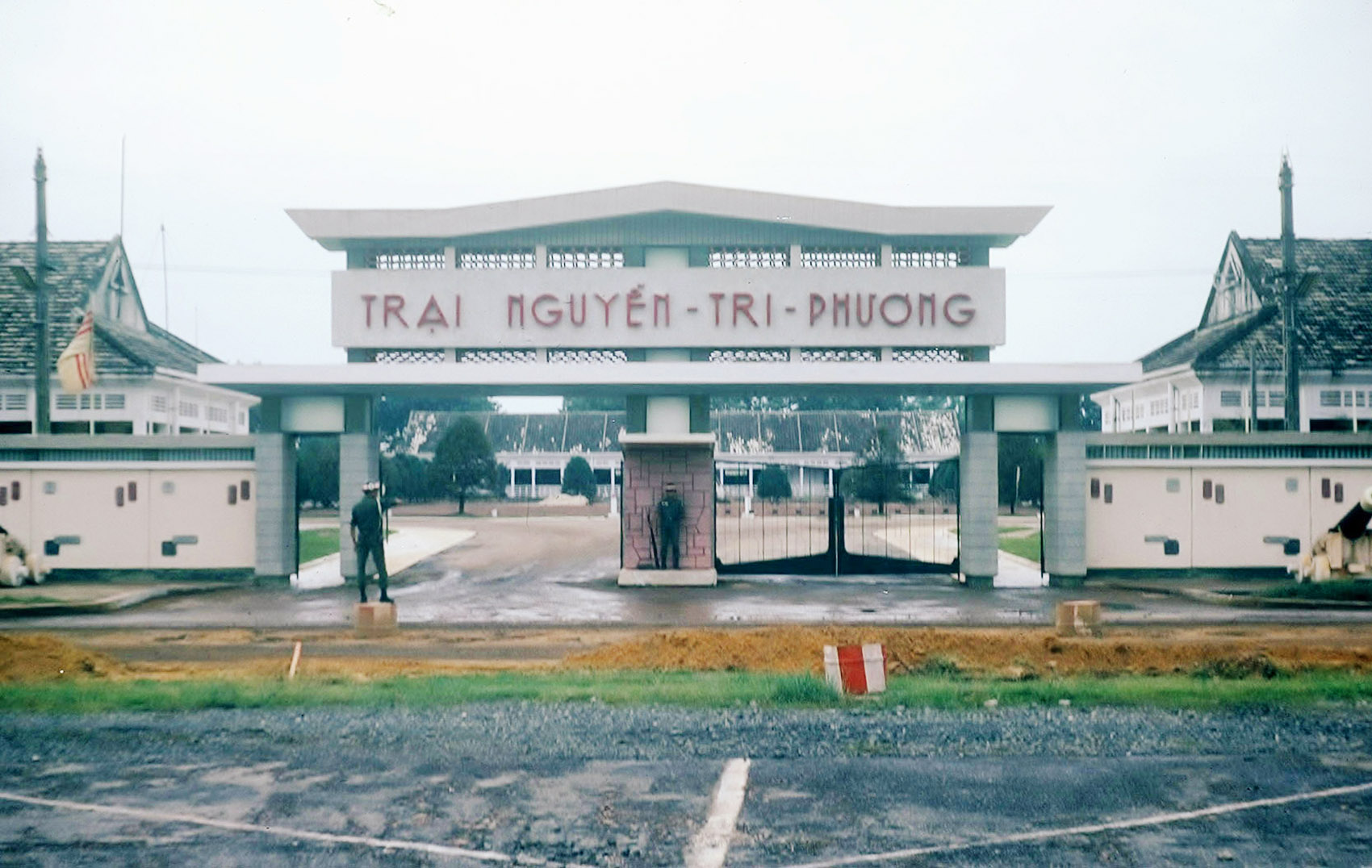
I Corps headquarters at Da Nang

I Corps ( Vietnamese: Quân đoàn I) was a corps of the Army of the Republic of Vietnam (ARVN), the army of the nation state of South Vietnam that existed from 1955 to 1975. It was one of four corps of the ARVN. This was the northernmost region of South Vietnam, bordering North Vietnam at the Vietnamese Demilitarized Zone (DMZ). These five provinces are Quảng Trị Province, (Khe Sanh, Đông Hà, Quảng Trị City), Thừa Thiên-Huế Province, (Phu Bai, Huế City), Quảng Nam Province, (Đà Nẵng, Hội An), Quảng Tín Province, (Tam Kỳ, Chu Lai) and Quảng Ngãi Province, (Quảng Ngãi).

== History ==
=== 1957-1961 ===
I Corps headquarters became operational at Danang on 1 June 1957 and was responsible for the area from Danang north to the DMZ. US advisors at I Corps headquarters consisted of about a dozen officers and enlisted men with a colonel of infantry as senior corps adviser, and two lieutenant colonels to advise the corps engineer, armor, ordnance, and signal units. Its assigned units were the 1st Field Division at Danang and the 2nd Field Division at Huế. US advisors at I Corps headquarters consisted of about a dozen officers and enlisted men with a colonel of infantry as senior corps adviser, and two lieutenant colonels to advise the corps engineer, armor, ordnance, and signal units.

I Corps' operational strategy focused its efforts on the heavily populated coastal plain, moving gradually westward to secure the piedmont. The bulk of the mountainous, but sparsely populated interior remained in VC hands, punctuated only by occasional raids to keep them off balance. The staff planned to establish a chain of strategic hamlets running north to south to block VC penetrations to the coast. The only new feature was a series of major clear-and-hold operations moving progressively from the southern end of the corps north to the DMZ.

=== 1962 ===
In January, the United States Army's 93rd Transportation Company (Light Helicopter), equipped with H-21C Shawnees was deployed to Da Nang Air Base.

In early September 1962, the United States Marine Corps (USMC) Operation Shufly helicopter squadron, equipped with HUS-1s (UH-34s) began redeploying with its support units from Soc Trang Airfield in IV Corps to Da Nang Air Base, completing the redeployment by 20 September. Simultaneously, the U.S. Army's 93rd Helicopter Company moved from Da Nang to Soc Trang.

=== 1964 ===
Following the 1963 South Vietnamese coup d'état, coup leader General Dương Văn Minh reassigned II Corps commander General Nguyễn Khánh to command I Corps, allegedly to get him as far from Saigon as possible. On 30 January 1964, Khánh overthrew Minh in a bloodless coup. By 6 March, Khánh had replaced three of the four Corps commanders. Khanh appointed BG Tôn Thất Xứng, to lead I Corps.

On 24 February 1964, Khánh issued the 1964 National Campaign Plan under the name Chien Thang (Struggle for Victory). Khanh decided the provinces surrounding Saigon would receive top priority in the distribution of troops, civil servants, and money. The rest of III Corps and IV Corps were next in the resource queue, whereas the provinces of II and I Corps had the lowest priority. One reason why the north received the least resources was that, at least before late 1963, it had appeared to be in the best shape. Thus, Chien Thang forecast that I and II Corps would be the first to enter into the final phase, the destruction of the enemy's last major formations and bases in January 1965, whereas III and IV Corps would not reach that point until January 1966.

The Diem regime's relative success in pacifying significant parts of I and II Corps had led to decisions in 1963 and 1964 to transfer troops to more troubled areas further south. This meant that troops were leaving just as the VC were increasing their efforts. The number of VC-initiated actions per month in I Corps quadrupled between November 1963 and February 1964. By infiltrating small guerrilla propaganda and terror teams from the mountains into the coastal plain, the VC began seriously to erode government control in certain areas.

I Corps' southernmost provinces of Quang Tin and Quang Nam posed the most difficulties. The French had never truly controlled this area during the Indochina War, handing South Vietnam a difficult legacy. The majority of enemy forces in I Corps resided in these two provinces, with each hosting a VC regimental headquarters and several battalions. The 2nd Division had responsibility for these provinces. In December 1963, the division had begun a new round of patrolling and some intensive training for an even greater effort to come. The plan for Quang Tin and Quang Nam envisioned a multiphase, 12-month process. During the first phase, from February to May, the ARVN would secure a narrow strip along Highway 1. In subsequent phases, the Civil Guard, protected by the 2nd Division's dense patrol screen, would solidify control over first the eastern coast and then the piedmont. The final phase, the destruction of the VC's mountain bases, would begin in 1965. During the first two phases, regimental commanders would assign battalions and companies to discrete geographical areas for the conduct of extensive day and night platoon- and company-size patrols. After a battalion cleared its zone, a task the Vietnamese estimated would take about three weeks, it would transfer the burden of holding the region to the Civil Guard and move to clear a new area, so that eventually government control would spread to all populated areas. The strategy saw initial success with Operation Dan Chien I reconquering the Phuoc Chau valley and returning 11,000 civilians to government control by late April.

On 24 March, a 53-man platoon from the 1st Battalion, 9th Marines arrived at Da Nang Air Base and assumed responsibility for security around the USMC compound and flightline.

By mid-1964, the US Corps senior advisor reported that "The pacification of I Corps Tactical Zone... is progressing inexorably towards the final victory over the Viet Cong."

In early July, as part of their summer offensive the VC and People's Army of Vietnam (PAVN) units attacked Nam Dong, losing the battle but forcing the relocation of the base. The 1st Division had its hands full trying to prevent pacified areas from regressing during the summer. Most operations inflicted few casualties, as the VC broke into small groups and avoided contact. The government worsened the situation by diverting all recruits meant for I and II Corps to III and IV Corps. In mid-August, the 2nd Division's new commander, Colonel Nguyen Thanh Sang, abandoned his predecessor's method of saturation patrolling. He terminated Operations Dan Chien 1 and 2 in favor of a more passive posture. As a result, pacification regressed in the Corps over the summer. Significant declines in population control in the 2nd Division's area, particularly in Quang Nam and Quang Tin Provinces, more than offset small gains in the 1st Division zone. By September, I Corps adviser Colonel Wohner admitted that the situation was "not encouraging."

In September, the Joint General Staff (JGS) reassigned Quang Ngai province from II Corps to I Corps.

In mid-September, four USMC four-man advisory teams drawn from the 3rd Marine Division, deployed to the Corps and were assigned to 1st and 2nd Division units.

On a visit to I Corps in October COMUSMACV General William Westmoreland described the situation as "depressing" and "dismal." Another officer noted that Highway 1 "is interdicted daily and must be traveled with armed escort. Almost all piedmont areas and many parts of the coastal plains are under communist control, and government administration below the district level is practically non-existent."

In November in the aftermath of the September 1964 South Vietnamese coup attempt, Khánh appointed Brigadier general Nguyễn Chánh Thi as the new Corps commander.

On 26 November with the rotation of the USMC security unit at Da Nang Air Base, Company L, 3rd Battalion, 9th Marines was reinforced with engineers, 81mm mortar teams, and counter-mortar radar personnel and designated as the Security Detachment, Marine Unit Vietnam.

By the end of the year, US advisers acknowledged that pacification had "made little progress, if any." All of I Corps' provincial advisory teams considered the state of pacification as unsatisfactory. US officers attributed this state of affairs to the enemy's growing strength, the result of increased recruiting and, particularly worrisome in their minds, increased North Vietnamese infiltration. One Marine officer stated "If this input is continued, we will shortly be in the third phase of counterinsurgency," that is, mobile conventional warfare. Population control was assessed to have declined from 81% in January to 51% in December.

At the end of 1964, a US Army helicopter aviation company or USMC helicopter squadron was assigned in direct support of each Vietnamese infantry division. Further fixed-wing transport, reconnaissance, and observation aircraft were available as well. As a result, each senior Corps adviser had between 70 and 100 aircraft at his disposal, with MACV retaining control over the rest.

=== 1965 ===
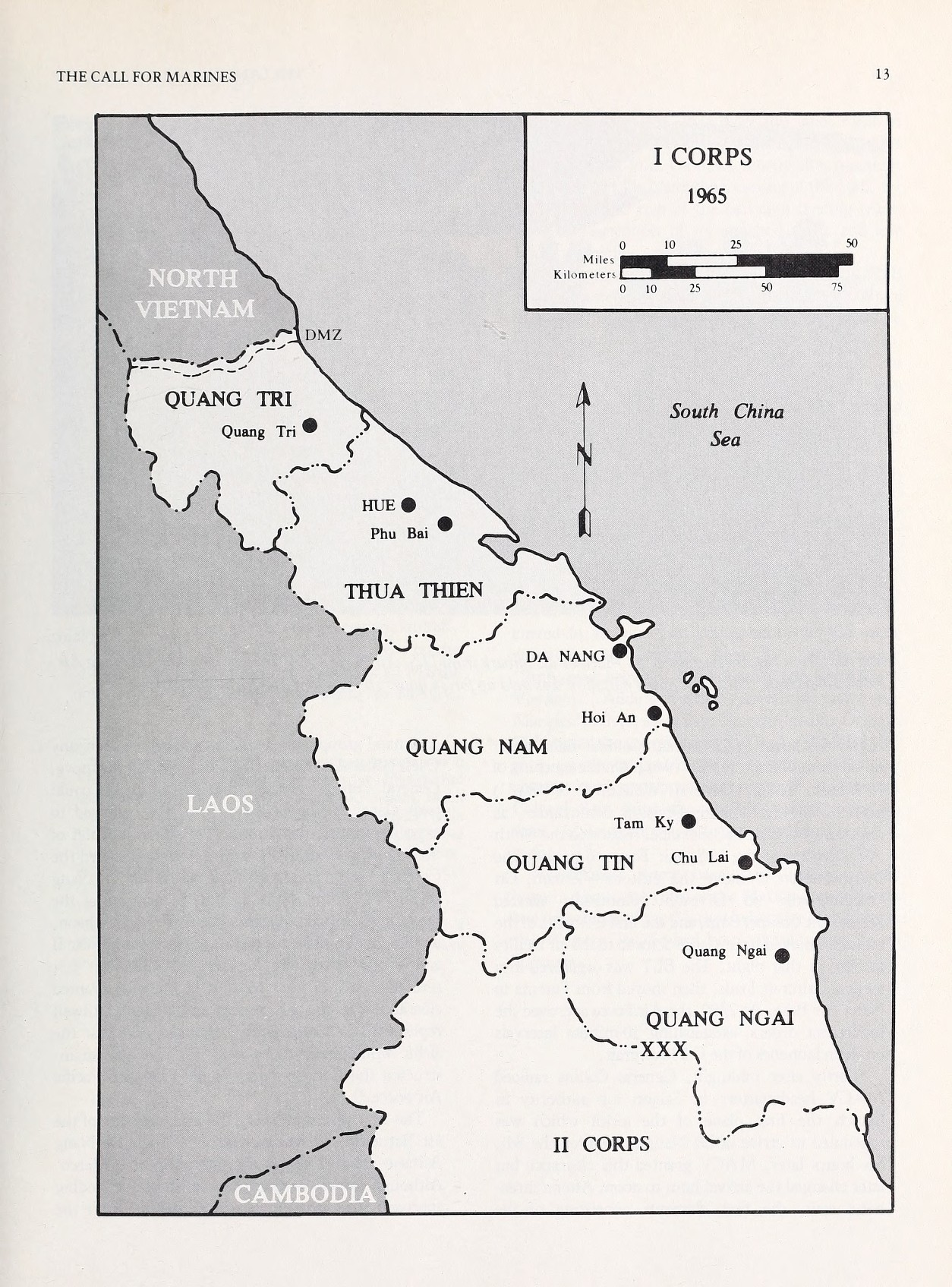
I Corps in 1965

Military Region 5 prioritized I Corps second to II Corps for its winter-spring offensive. It expected its forces in I Corps to continue to erode the government's presence and, if possible, to defeat a few government units. Most importantly, it directed its troops in southern I Corps to assist those in northern II Corps in cutting South Vietnam in two. As for the government, its plans for I Corps focused on furthering pacification, continuing its long-standing effort to secure the populated flatlands that lay between the South China Sea to the east and the north–south rail line to the west. The two visions were incompatible.

Thi embraced the government's pacification plan except in Quang Nam and Quang Tin, where he felt it was more important to pacify the piedmont immediately west of the railroad before moving east to the coast. He allocated 70% of his regular army forces to pacification and security work. In all provinces, he assigned primary importance to keeping Highway 1 open.

The VC didn't undertake any major attacks in January, but continuous low-level subversive activity and distractions caused by political turmoil in Saigon and Buddhist riots in several northern cities meant the Corps made little progress in pacification. Nor would it make any progress the following month, for as in II Corps, the VC launched a fresh wave of assaults in the early hours of 7 February attacking an outpost protecting Tam Ky losing 230 killed and seven captured while killing 37 ARVN. The attacks continued across the Corps until late March.

On 7 February, as US aircraft conducted Operation Flaming Dart, bombing attacks on North Vietnam in retaliation for the attack on Camp Holloway in II Corps, President Lyndon Johnson ordered the USMC to deploy an antiaircraft unit to protect Da Nang Air Base, with the 1st Light Anti-Aircraft Missile Battalion arriving on 8 February. When Johnson opted to replace Flaming Dart's tit-for-tat retaliatory strikes with Operation Rolling Thunder in late February, a violent reaction from North Vietnam now deemed more likely. As a result, on 8 March the 9th Marine Expeditionary Brigade (9th MEB) went ashore to defend Da Nang Air Base.

During the first three months of 1965, the percentage of the Corps' more than 1.8 million people living under government control had risen from 24% to 26%. Similarly, the percentage of the population over which the government either controlled or exercised some manner of influence had risen from 51% to 56%. As in II Corps, the increases were due as much to people fleeing the VC as to successful pacification operations. By the end of March 1965, 112,000 refugees crowded into I Corps' towns and cities.

On 10 April, the 2nd Battalion, 3rd Marines was deployed to Phu Bai Airfield, south of Huế to provide security for the airfield and the US Army's 8th Radio Research Unit.

On 11 April, the mission of the US Marines at Danang was changed from defensive operations around the air base to offensive operations within I Corps.

In April, Westmoreland convinced the JGS to order the commanders of I, II, and IV Corps to develop Hop Tac-style pacification programs for their areas. After receiving joint MACV-JGS briefings about the program, the commanders presented their plans on 3 May. I Corps was to create a Hop Tac program centered on Da Nang.

On 18 April, the 2nd Division attacked the headquarters of the VC 1st Regiment in the Viet An area of Quang Tin province. The attack turned into a rout with the allies losing 26 dead, 28 missing, and eight crew-served and 25 individual weapons lost for 53 VC killed.

On 24 April, the VC attacked a USMC reconnaissance platoon on a hilltop 2 km south of Phu Bai, resulting in two Marines and two VC killed.

On 6 May, units from the 2nd Division and the 3rd Battalion, 9th Marines secured the Chu Lai area southeast of Danang. On 7 May, the 3rd Marine Expeditionary Brigade (3rd MEB), landed at Chu Lai to establish a jet-capable airfield and base area.

On 7 May, the USMC units in the Corps were redesignated as the III Marine Amphibious Force (III MAF), headquartered at Da Nang.

In mid-1965, the VC planned to make the northern half of South Vietnam—and particularly the area of southern I Corps and northern II Corps—the focal point for their new offensive. Military Region 5 planned a series of operations in I Corps designed to destroy ARVN battalions and to liberate additional populated areas. All provinces would see action, but the VC's focal point was northern Quang Ngai.

On 28 May, the VC attacked Ba Gia inflicting a defeat on the ARVN in a three-day battle.

During June, MR 5 followed up its battlefield victories of late May with myriad small actions that challenged the government's control throughout I Corps. The US Mission reported that I Corps had lost control of 215,000 people and 240 of the region's 1,599 hamlets. By the end of June 1965, the USOM adviser in Quang Tin reported that only 13 of 426 hamlets now met the six-point criteria for pacification. I Corps' revised pacification plan, which was to have gone into effect on 1 May, remained moribund. Not surprisingly, Quang Ngai seemed to be suffering the most. The USOM representative wrote that the situation in Quang Ngai was "critical and deteriorating," and that the South Vietnamese were preparing “for the last ditch stand they feel is in the offing.” Unless reinforcements and supplies arrived, "the bitter end may not be far off."

In late June and early July, MR 5 tried to weaken allied airpower by bombarding six airfields in I Corps. At Da Nang, sappers used a bombardment to sneak by U.S. Marine guards and destroy four aircraft. Other insurgents continued to interdict lines of communications, ambush patrols, and further erode the government's position in the countryside. By mid-July, Highway 1 was impassible through most of I Corps, but efforts to reclaim the road were underway. In Quang Ngai, the summer offensive had worsened an already critical situation; the South Vietnamese had lost control of 62 hamlets in Quang Ngai and 50% of the people and terrain it had governed two months earlier.

By late July, the entire 3rd Marine Division had been deployed into the Corps.

On 1 August, the 3rd Battalion, 4th Marines at Phu Bai began integrating a Marine squad into a Popular Forces platoon in what would later become formalized as the Combined Action Program.

On 3 August, the Cam Ne incident occurred when the 1st Battalion, 9th Marines torched houses in the VC-controlled Cam Ne village south of Da Nang Air Base.

From 18 to 24 August, five USMC battalions conducted Operation Starlite against the VC 1st Regiment south of Chu Lai.

On 26 August, Marine Aircraft Group 16 moved into the newly opened Marble Mountain Air Facility.

From 7 to 10 September, two USMC battalions, the 2nd Battalion, 4th Regiment and the 3rd Marine Battalion conducted Operation Piranha on the Batangan Peninsula.

On the evening of 27–28 October 1965, approximately 90 VC attacked Marble Mountain Air Facility, destroying 19 aircraft (13 UH-1E and six UH-34 helicopters) and damaging another 35 (four UH-1E and 26 UH-34). Two Marines and one Navy Corpsman were killed, 17 VC were killed and four captured.

On the evening of 17 November, the VC 1st Regiment overran the Regional Forces garrison defending Hiệp Đức at the mouth of the Quế Sơn Valley. On the 18th, two ARVN battalions were landed with USMC air support, despite heavy VC antiaircraft fire. By the 19th, the ARVN had recaptured Hiệp Đức killing 141 VC and capturing 87 weapons while losing 33 killed.

From 8 to 20 December, four USMC battalions, three 2nd Division battalions and the 11th Ranger Battalion conducted Operation Harvest Moon in the Quế Sơn Valley.

By late 1965, Major General Lewis W. Walt, the commander of III MAF and the I Corps senior adviser, assessed the 1st Infantry Division under General Nguyễn Văn Chuân as "waging a skillful campaign... consistently destroying the VC in all significant encounters." South of Huế, his evaluation was less optimistic. The 2nd Infantry Division had done little, and the independent 51st Infantry Regiment had not budged from its static defensive positions. Westmoreland blamed the 2nd Division's temerity on its "less aggressive" commander, General Hoàng Xuân Lãm who had been either unwilling or unable to get the unit moving during the year.

In the Combined Campaign Plan for 1966, which the JGS and MACV issued in December, the allies declared their "basic objective" for the year to be clearing, securing, and developing the heavily populated regions around Saigon, in the Mekong Delta, and in selected portions of the I and II Corps coastal plain. "Coincident" with this effort, they would defend significant outlying government and population centers and conduct search and destroy operations against "major VC/PAVN forces." In pursuit of these objectives, South Vietnamese forces would concentrate on defending, clearing, and securing the designated strategic areas. American and third-country forces, besides securing their own bases and helping to protect rice-producing areas, were to "conduct operations outside of the secure areas against VC forces and bases." Implicit in these words was the de facto division of labor between the South Vietnamese and Americans that had been in effect since the summer.

=== 1966 ===
On 17 January, the USMC 1st Marine Regiment headquarters arrived at Chu Lai as the lead element of the 1st Marine Division to be deployed to South Vietnam.

From 28 January to 17 February, III MAF and the 2nd Division conducted Operation Double Eagle in southern Quảng Ngãi province.

The 1st Division conducted Operation Lam Son 235 east and south of Quang Tri City accounted for over 240 PAVN/VC killed, for the loss of 23 killed through the end of February.

From 26 February to 3 March, two battalions from the 1st Marines conducted Operation New York northwest and east of Phu Bai Combat Base.

From 4 to 7 March, three USMC battalions, two Airborne battalions and one Range battalion conducted Operation Utah northwest of Quảng Ngãi.

From 8 to 10 March, the PAVN 325th Division attacked the A Shau Special Forces Camp, overrunning the base.

From 19 to 23 March, two USMC battalions conducted Operation Oregon on the Street Without Joy about 36 km northwest of Huế.

From 20 to 25 March, the 1st Marine Division, 2nd Division and the 5th Airborne Battalion conducted Operation Texas northwest of Quảng Ngãi.

On 29 March, the 1st Marine Division headquarters was established at Chu Lai.

From 17 April to 1 May, the 1st Battalion, 1st Marines conducted Operation Virginia around Khe Sanh in northwest Quang Tri province.

On 21 April, 3rd Marine Division units established An Hoa Combat Base as a permanent base camp to secure the An Hoa industrial complex.

In early 1966, after the military junta announced plans to draft a new constitution, domestic critics of the military regime united under two prominent Buddhist leaders, the militant Thích Trí Quang, heading the High Council of the Buddhist Hierarchy in Central Vietnam, and the more moderate Thích Tâm Châu, presiding over the Buddhist Institute for Secular Affairs in Saigon. Both religious leaders railed against government corruption and inefficiency, declining economic conditions, and the regime's subservience to American influence. They demanded the immediate resignation of the Nguyễn Văn Thiệu-Nguyễn Cao Kỳ government, its replacement by an elected national assembly to draw up a constitution, and a rapid settlement of the war. The bonzes drew immediate support from Buddhists and students in the major South Vietnamese cities. Huế, a focal point for regional interests in the northern I Corps, quickly became the center of the protest for dissidents, who, by March, had formed a loose confederation known as the Struggle Movement.

Corps' commander Thi, a Buddhist and political rival of Kỳ, failed to take action against the protestors. Kỳ accused Thi of seeking to topple the regime and strengthen his own political base by supporting the Struggle Movement. On 11 March Kỳ replaced Thi with Chuân as Corps' commander. The replacement of the popular Thi sparked the Buddhist Uprising and by the beginning of April Struggle Movement forces appeared to control most of Huế, Da Nang, and Hoi An and had the support of Corps' headquarters and the 1st Division. At the same time, ARVN combat operations began to peter out, and the danger that the crisis presented to the war effort became evident. As Chuẩn supported the Struggle Movement, on 9 April Kỳ replaced him with Lieutenant general Tôn Thất Đính, a native of Huế and a favorite of the Buddhist leaders, in an attempt to shut down the opposition. Dinh proved either unwilling or unable to restore the normal tempo of combat operations. During a visit to the zone on 1 May, Westmoreland found crowds of local combat troops in the streets of Huế and Da Nang and rejected Dinh's assertion that the political situation there was settling down.

On 15 May, government forces, commanded by JGS chairman General Cao Văn Viên, seized Da Nang in the early morning hours. Two Marine Corps battalions, supported by tanks and covered by Republic of Vietnam Air Force planes, moved quickly into the city and secured the mayor's office, the radio station, the I Corps headquarters and other military installations, and the police stations. Two Airborne battalions provided reinforcements. Little fighting transpired, as most of the dissidents fell back inside several Buddhist pagodas, which the troops refrained from attacking. Kỳ and General Nguyễn Hữu Có later joined Viên, and during the next four days an uneasy truce prevailed inside the city. When Đính objected to the action, the junta replaced him with the political warfare director, General Huỳnh Văn Cao. Đính fled first to General Walt's headquarters and then north to Huế, where he joined Thi, 1st Division commander Phan Xuân Nhuận, several dissident province chiefs, and leading Buddhists in publicly denouncing the return of government troops. Nhuận placed units of the 1st Division on the approaches to Huế and at the nearby Phu Bai airfield, but made no move to reinforce Da Nang. 2nd Division commander, Lãm, remained loyal to the government, but some elements of his unit made their way to Da Nang to take part in the revolt. Lãm warned that any attack on the pagodas would cause more troop defections and even recommended reinstating Thi as Corps' commander.

On 16 May, Walt met with Cao and was unimpressed. In talks with both Walt and Special Assistant to the COMUSMACV Colonel John F. Freund, Cao revealed that he had no interest in commanding the corps and that other Directory members had coerced him into taking the assignment. On 17 May Cao flew in a U.S. Marine Corps helicopter to Huế to confer with dissident Generals Thi and Nhuận. Accompanying him were Walt's chief of staff, Brigadier general Jonas M. Platt and the I Corps deputy senior adviser, Colonel Archelaus L. Hamblen Jr. After Thi and Nhuận declined to see him, Cao returned to the helicopter and prepared to depart when about a hundred students and soldiers rushed the helicopter pad. Cao scrambled aboard, but as the aircraft began to rise, a South Vietnamese lieutenant began firing at it with a .45-caliber pistol. Returning the fire, the American helicopters door gunner killed the lieutenant and wounded several other South Vietnamese soldiers. Cao returned to Da Nang when he encountered more trouble in the person of Colonel Nguyễn Ngọc Loan, chief of the National Police. Loan insisted that Cao order an immediate attack on the pagodas in Da Nang and apparently threatened Cao with bodily harm if he refused. Sometime during an ensuing argument, Hamblen arrived unannounced to find Cao surrounded by Loan and several of his armed police. Terrified, Cao departed with Hamblen and subsequently begged Walt for asylum. He later explained that had he ordered attacks on the pagodas, the Buddhists might have taken reprisals against his Roman Catholic parents, who resided in Huế, and other Catholics. Although first Viên, then Có, flew to Da Nang to try to calm Cao, neither was able to coax him out of the US Marine Corps compound.

On the afternoon of 19 May, Kỳ and Thiệu at last decided to act decisively. Because Cao continued to refuse to order an attack on the pagodas, they finally told Viên to do the job. Under the deputy airborne commander, Colonel Ngô Quang Trưởng, five battalions, numbering some 3,300 troops, forcibly occupied most of the pagodas and the remaining military installations within the city. In an effort to hold down casualties Trưởng surrounded the two main centers of resistance, located in the Tan Linh and Thinh Hoi pagodas, and offered amnesty to any who would surrender. On 21 May, the dissidents in the Tan Linh pagoda surrendered and two days later the remaining hold-outs capitulated. While Loan's police arrested the mayor of Da Nang, RVNAF planes dispersed a dissident battalion marching on the city from Hue. By the 24th, Da Nang was under complete government control. According to rough US estimates, casualties for both sides included 150 South Vietnamese dead and 700 wounded.

On 19 May, PAVN units in early morning assaults, attacked ARVN outposts at Gio Linh and Con Thien, just south of the DMZ. The ARVN lost 43 dead at Gio Linh and 20 casualties at Con Thien.

On 22 May, the 2nd Battalion, 2nd Regiment, in a search and destroy mission 8 km north of Dong Ha, located a VC company, killing 35 and capturing three, at a cost of seven ARVN dead.

General Trần Thanh Phong replaced Cao as temporary commander of I Corps and then the junta appointed loyalist Lãm at the end of May, becoming the sixth Corps' commander in three months.

On 27 May and 1 June, Walt sponsored formal meetings at Chu Lai between members of the opposing military factions. The American mediators emphasized their support for the existing Saigon government and guaranteed the safety of the dissident generals should they accept offers of amnesty. Continued government control of Da Nang and the announcement of an agreement between the Directory and the Buddhist Institute reinforced the government's position. Cao finally agreed to return to Saigon, and although Thi and Đính elected to remain in the northern zone, they indicated their willingness to cooperate. When the chief of Thua Thien province (who was also mayor of Huế) also threw his lot in with the government, only Nhuận and his 1st Division remained to be persuaded. The Directory already had a plan to bring Nhuận and his division into line. Viên estimated that two of the division's three regiments would remain neutral, but he expected trouble from a few division headquarters elements and the third regiment commanded by a nephew of Thi. Viên intended to send the potentially difficult regiment north to Quang Tri province for combined operations with USMC units. Should Nhuận refuse to cooperate, the Directory would dismiss him. Government troops would blockade the remaining rebel forces at Huế and offer them amnesty. Force was to be used only as a last resort.

On 26 May, Struggle Movement demonstrators (including soldiers) had burned the US Information Agency's library in Huế and then on 1 June, sacked the US consulate there. American observers blamed the acts on Thích Trí Quang. A few days later the Saigon government's understanding with the more moderate Buddhist Institute broke down, and Buddhist clergy once again were aligned against the regime.

On 5 June, the PAVN/VC ambushed a six-man USAF survey team from the USAF radar facility at Dong Ha killing all six airmen.

On 7 June, as turmoil in Huế continued, Buddhist priests placed altars as roadblocks on the main thoroughfares of Huế, Da Nang, Quang Tri, and Qui Nhon, and military and civilian traffic ground to a halt. When local troops refused to remove the altars, the Directory decided to use government forces.

Starting on 10 June, Kỳ began a steady buildup of special riot police under Loan on the outskirts of Huế and, on the 15th, sent a task force of two Airborne and two Marine battalions under Trưởng into the city for a final showdown. Intermittent fighting lasted in Huế for four days. Opposition was disorganized and consisted of about 1,000 1st Division troops, mostly soldiers from support units. Protected by Trưởng's forces, Loan's police removed the Buddhist altars and arrested most of the remaining leaders of the Struggle Movement, including Thích Trí Quang. The Directory gave Trưởng command of the 1st Division, and by the end of June both the division and Huế were under firm government control. On 23 June, government troops and police swept through the Buddhist Institute in Saigon, eliminating the last stronghold of the Buddhist leaders. On 9 July 1966, a special military tribunal dismissed Cao, Đính, Thi and Nhuận from the ARVN.

The revolt in the I Corps was finally over. Aside from a comparatively slight reduction in military operations, the crisis had little effect on the battlefield. Although surprised by the turmoil, the VC failed to take advantage of it. The Thiệu-Kỳ regime successfully tested its power against the Buddhists and a popular Corps commander and, as a consequence, seemed to increase its political standing. While the government agreed to hold elections for a constituent assembly, it successfully resisted demands to have the projected assembly replace the Kỳ government. On the other hand, several good commanders, notably Thi and Chuân, were gone, and the chief virtue of Lãm, the new I Corps commander, was his loyalty to the current Saigon regime. The crisis also marked the last stand of the Buddhists as an intermediate political force, leaving the Vietnamese people little choice between the Saigon generals on one end of the political spectrum and the VC on the other.

From 15 to 16 June, a team from the 1st Reconnaissance Battalion fought the Battle of Hill 488 in the Hiệp Đức district.

From 21 to 23 June, two 1st Division battalions together with two South Vietnamese Marine battalions and supported by its armored troops and USMC air support, fought the PAVN 808th Battalion and a battalion of the PAVN 6th Regiment 7 km northeast of Quang Tri City. The ARVN and Marines killed 312 PAVN and captured 40, including a company commander. South Vietnamese losses were 37 killed.

From 25 June to 2 July, three USMC battalions and one South Vietnamese Marine battalion conducted Operation Jay, while 1st Division elements conducted Operation Lam Son 284 in the Quảng Điền District of Thừa Thiên province.

From 4 July to 28 October, three USMC battalions conducted Operation Macon in western Quảng Nam province.

From 15 July to 3 August, the 3rd Marine Division and 1st Division conducted Operation Hastings/Lam Son 289 along the DMZ.

From 3 August to 31 January 1967, the 3rd Marine Division conducted Operation Prairie along the DMZ. By the end of 1966 Prairie had become an operational area.

By 1966 Walt viewed the Combined Action Program (CAP) a success, stiffening the morale of the poorly trained and equipped territorials, pushing them out of their fixed fortifications, and putting them to work in the field. Over the next several years, he gradually extended the program to each of the five provinces in I Corps, guarding about 350 hamlets with 114 CAP units comprising 2,000 US marine and US Navy corpsman and 3,000 Popular Forces soldiers. Through a formal written agreement with the Corps' commanders, Walt had his Marine noncommissioned officers leading, not advising, the mixed contingents under supervisory CAP elements at the district and province headquarters.

From 6 to 22 August, the 1st Marine Division, 2nd Division and South Vietnamese Marines conducted Operation Colorado/Lien Ket 52 in the Hiệp Đức District.

On 18 August, the South Korean 2nd Marine Brigade began redeploying from Tuy Hoa in II Corps north to Chu Lai.

From 15 to 18 September, the Special Landing Force of 1st Battalion, 26th Marines conducted Operation Deckhouse IV in the eastern DMZ.

On 29 September, the 1st Battalion, 3rd Marines established Khe Sanh Combat Base.

On 6 October, the 3rd Marine Division was ordered to move from Da Nang into Thua Thien and Quang Tri provinces. The 1st Marine Division assumed the responsibility for the Da Nang TAOR in addition to the Chu Lai area of operations. On 10 October the new 3rd Marine Division headquarters was opened at Phu Bai. The 3rd Marine Division established a forward headquarters at Dong Ha. Dong Ha Combat Base become a forward USMC base and the center of operations in the northern area. Its airfield and that at Khe Sanh had been lengthened so that both easily could handle KC-130 transports. The Marines and Navy also developed a sizeable port facility at Dong Ha to accommodate craft bringing supplies up the Cua Viet River.

In November MACV and the JGS released their new combined campaign plan. It reflected the division of labor already in effect. The plan divided South Vietnam into three mission-oriented areas. Critical were those designated as "National Priority Areas" and "Areas of Priority for Military Offensive Operations." The remainder constituted a mix of sparsely inhabited regions of less military consequence or areas where weather, terrain, or troop strength limited allied effectiveness, such as those opposite the DMZ or along the Laotian border. The two priority categories comprised about half of South Vietnam and included about 77% of its population, 85% of its food production, and 75% of its roads. According to MACV, these areas also contained 77% of the enemy's conventional units and 43% of his bases Ostensibly, South Vietnamese forces would have primary responsibility for providing security in the National Priority Areas-heavily populated zones with reasonably good road and water networks. For this mission, all ARVN regular infantry battalions were to receive special revolutionary development, or pacification, training during 1966 and 1967, and at least half were to be assigned direct pacification support or security missions as soon as possible. Meanwhile, the more mobile American forces would take the fight to the enemy in the less accessible Areas of Priority for Military Offensive Operations. Only in IV Corps were both securing and offensive missions given to South Vietnamese commanders. While the South Vietnamese would pursue a strategy of pacification, US forces would follow one of attrition.

=== 1967 ===
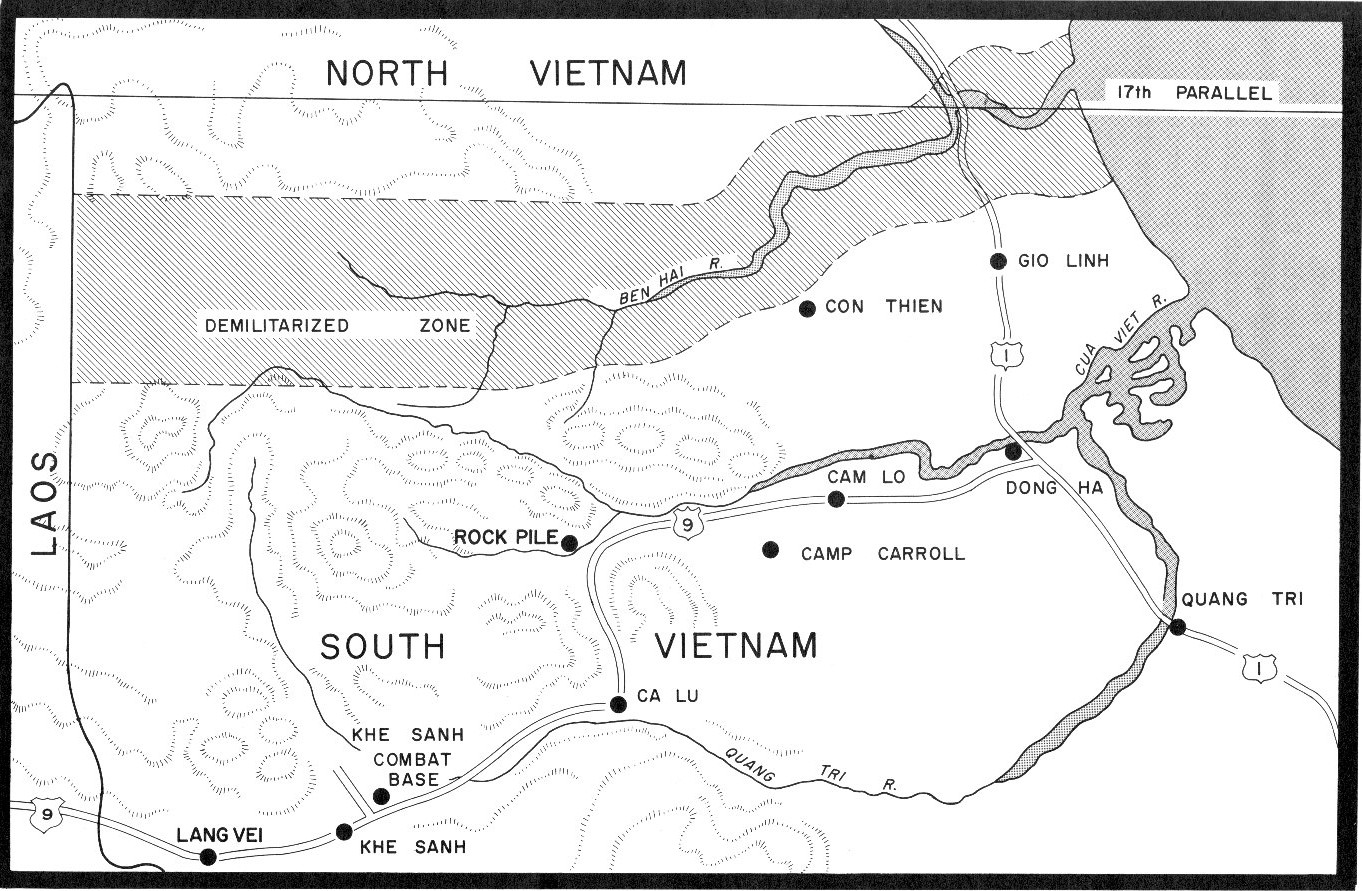
DMZ map

From 27 January to 7 April, the 3rd Battalion, 7th Marines conducted Operation Desoto in the Đức Phổ District.

From 1 February to 18 March, the 3rd Marine Division conducted Operation Prairie II along the DMZ.

In mid-February, the ROK marines and ARVN forces fought the PAVN 21st Regiment, 2nd Division that had entered Quang Ngai from the north. In the Battle of Trà Bình northwest of Quang Ngai City, they reported killing over 246 PAVN.

From 19 March to 19 April, the 3rd Marine Division conducted Operation Prairie III along the DMZ.

In early April, ground-clearing work began between Con Thien combat base and Firebase Gio Linh just south of the eastern DMZ, as the first phase of construction of the Strongpoint Obstacle System, more commonly known as the McNamara Line.

On 6 April, a large PAVN/VC force broke into Quang Tri City, inflicting severe losses and permitting more than 200 VC prisoners to escape from the local jail.

On 6 April, MACV implemented Task Force Oregon which involved the movement of an Army task force, consisting of the 3rd Brigade, 25th Infantry Division, 1st Brigade, 101st Airborne Division and the 196th Light Infantry Brigade, to Đức Phổ District and Chu Lai area to allow the 1st Marine Division to completely move north to Danang.

From 7 to 27 April, the 2nd Brigade, 1st Cavalry Division conducted Operation Lejeune in Đức Phổ District to relieve the 3rd Battalion, 7th Marines at Landing Zone Montezuma until they could be replaced by Task Force Oregon forces.

On 20 April, the headquarters of Task Force Oregon at Chu Lai assumed control of all US Army forces in southern I Corps.

From 20 April to 17 May, the 3rd Marine Division conducted Operation Prairie IV north of Con Thien.

From 21 April to 16 May, the US 1st Marine Regiment conducted Operation Union in the Quế Sơn valley.

From 24 April to 11 May, the 2nd Battalion, 3rd Marines, 3rd Battalion, 3rd Marines and the 9th Marine Regiment fought The Hill Fights on several hill masses north of the Khe Sanh Combat Base.

From 28 April to 12 May, the 1st Battalion, 3rd Marines conducted Operation Beaver Cage in the Que Son Valley.

On 8 May, the PAVN attempted to overrun Con Thien combat base. The PAVN lost 197 killed and 8 prisoners. The Marines lost 44 killed and the CIDG had 14 killed with two missing.

From 11 May to 2 August, the 1st Brigade, 101st Airborne Division conducted Operations Malheur I and Malheur II against PAVN/VC bases in the foothills of Quảng Ngãi province.

From 13 May to 16 July, the 26th Marine Regiment conducted Operation Crockett on the hills north of Khe Sanh Combat Base.

From 18 to 28 May, the 3rd Marine Division conducted Operation Hickory in the DMZ around Con Thien.

From 26 May to 5 June, the 5th Marine Regiment and the 6th Regiment conducted Operation Union II/Lien Ket 106 in the Quế Sơn Valley.

On 2 July, the PAVN ambushed two companies of the 1st Battalion, 9th Marines northeast of Con Thien, killing 84 with nine missing, making this the worst one-day loss for the USMC in Vietnam. In response, the 3rd Marine Division launched Operation Buffalo which continued until 14 July.

On 3 July, the VC attacked Company F, 5th Marines at Nông Sơn district killing 13 Marines while losing 44 killed.

On the night of 14 July, two platoons of VC, dressed in ARVN uniforms, attacked the Hoi An provincial jail, releasing 1,196 military and political prisoners. The ARVN recaptured 206 prisoners and killed 30 and five VC, but 960 prisoners had escaped. That same night, a PAVN/VC rocket attack on Da Nang Air Base killed eight Americans, destroyed 10 aircraft, 13 barracks, and a bomb dump, and damaged 40 more aircraft.

From 16 July to 31 October, the 3rd Marine Division conducted Operation Kingfisher north of Con Thien.

On 21 July, an infantry unit sweeping ahead of an 85-vehicle convoy trying to bring 175mm guns to reinforce Khe Sanh Combat Base encountered strong PAVN forces along Route 9. While the 3rd Marine Division continued to run some convoys, Route 9 was effectively closed west of Camp Carroll.

By the end of July, PAVN/VC activity had declined in the Corps as they regrouped for attacks around the September elections. Their plans called for assaults in each of the five northern provinces, together with a demonstration along the DMZ intended to attract large numbers of US forces to its defense. During the summer lull, the VC 1st and 2nd Regiments, both weakened, departed from Quang Ngai province. The former rejoined the 2nd Division up in Quang Tin, while the latter traveled south to rejoin the 3rd Division in Binh Dinh.

From 2 to 13 August, the 1st Brigade, 101st Airborne Division, ROK 2nd Marine Brigade and ARVN Ranger and Airborne forces conducted Operation Hood River against Base Area 121, 20 km west of Quảng Ngãi.

From 11 to 28 August, the 1st Marine Division and 2nd Division conducted Operation Cochise/Lien Ket 112 in the Que Son Valley. The operation resulted in 362 PAVN killed and 25 captured for the loss of 10 USMC killed and 83 ARVN killed and three missing.

From 13 to 29 August, the 1st Brigade, 101st Airborne Division conducted Operation Benton against Base Area 117 west of Chu Lai.

In an attempt to reduce civilian casualties and to deny peasant support of the PAVN/VC, allied troops relocated more than 30,000 people from rural Quang Ngai between June and September, swelling the refugee lists to over 168,000, or some 20% of the provincial population.

From 4 to 15 September, the 1st Marine Division conducted Operation Swift in the Que Son Valley.

From 5 September to 31 October, the ROK 2nd Marine Brigade conducted Operation Dragon Fire against the VC 48th Battalion on the Batangan Peninsula.

On 6 September, a VC attack on Tam Ky was repulsed by gunships and ARVN forces resulting in over 200 VC killed for the loss of 21 ARVN.

On 10 September, the 3rd Battalion, 26th Marines engaged units of the PAVN 812th Regiment 6.5 km southwest of Con Thien resulting in 140 PAVN and 34 Marines killed.

From 11 September, the 1st Brigade, 101st Airborne Division launched Operation Wheeler against Base Area 116 west of Tam Ky.

In September, the PAVN started a major bombardment of Con Thien, hitting it with at least 200 artillery and mortar rounds daily, peaking on 25 September when a reported 1200 rounds hit the base. The artillery was located in or north of the DMZ

By mid-September, the 3rd Marine Division had only completed the clearing of the Trace from Con Thien to Gio Linh. Faced with mounting casualties, Westmoreland approved a modification to his original plans. In essence, the division was to halt all construction of the Trace until "after the tactical situation had stabilized," and continue only with the work on the strong points and base areas.

On 25 September, Task Force Oregon was redesignated the 23rd Infantry Division (Americal) and given responsibility for all of Quang Ngai and Quang Tin provinces and part of Quang Nam.

On 30 September, the 3rd Brigade, 1st Cavalry Division replaced the 5th Marine Regiment operating in the Quế Sơn valley. On 4 October, the brigade launched Operation Wallowa in the Hiệp Đức District-Quế Sơn Valley.

In October, US engineers opened Sa Huỳnh Base to provide logistical support for Americal operations in southern I Corps.

From 11 to 20 October, three USMC battalions conducted Operation Medina in the Hải Lăng Forest south of Quảng Trị.

In October, MACV and South Vietnamese commands finalized plans for the upcoming year. Although pacification activities occurred in every province in South Vietnam, the Combined Campaign Plan for 1968 (AB 143) continued the previous year's program of concentrating resources on 26 of South Vietnam's 44 provinces. Omitted were areas where the enemy's military forces were strongest—such as the northernmost and southernmost reaches of the country. The 1968 plan called for the greatest effort to be made in areas close to Saigon, with the rest of the country receiving progressively fewer resources the farther north or south one traveled from that location. The MACV and Vietnamese staffs further decided that for 1968 they would focus the pacification effort on two types of areas. First, they wished to solidify control over areas in which the South Vietnamese government already held some sway. Second, they wanted to target areas where a significant number of people could be added to the rolls of those living under government authority without expanding allied resources over a large physical area. Military plans reflected the pacification design. The 1968 Campaign Plan designated most of the pacification priority provinces as priority areas for offensive military operations. Other areas targeted for offensive action were the four northernmost provinces, where the enemy posed a significant threat due to the proximity of North Vietnam. Disrupting the enemy in these areas would both shield pacification efforts in the more populated areas and pave the way for geographical expansion in the future. Since the areas the allies planned to target in 1968 were similar to those of 1967, little movement of forces was needed to execute the AB 143 plan. In I Corps two US Marine divisions and one US Army division would continue to battle heavy PAVN forces that drew support from North Vietnam.

From 20 October to 16 February 1968, four USMC battalions conducted Operation Osceola in the Hải Lăng Forest and around Quang Tri Combat Base.

From 1 November to 20 January 1968, the 3rd Marine Regiment conducted Operation Lancaster in the central DMZ area.

From 1 November to 25 January 1968, four USMC battalions conducted Operation Neosho in northern Thừa Thiên Province.

From 1 November 1967 until 28 February 1969, the 3rd Marine Division conducted Operation Kentucky along the eastern DMZ.

From November, the 1st Amphibian Tractor Battalion at Cửa Việt Base was given responsibility for the Operation Napoleon TAOR.

From 6 to 17 November, the 2nd Battalion, 5th Marines conducted Operation Essex in "Antenna Valley", Hiệp Đức District.

On 11 November, Operations Wheeler and Wallowa were combined to simplify command and control arrangements. Operation Wheeler/Wallowa would continue until 11 November 1968.

From 13 to 30 November, two USMC battalions conducted Operation Foster/Badger Hunt in the Đại Lộc district resulting in 125 PAVN/VC killed and eight captured.

From 18 December to 10 June 1968 the Americal Division conducted Operation Muscatine in Quảng Ngãi province.

From 26 December to 2 January 1968, the 3rd Battalion, 1st Marines conducted Operation Badger Tooth in the Street Without Joy.

From 28 December to 3 January 1968, three USMC battalions conducted Operation Auburn on Go Noi Island, 25 km south of Danang.

By the end of the year, the Americal Division had taken over the ROK Marine Brigade's TAOR south of Chu Lai and the Koreans had moved north to Hoi An replacing the 5th Marine Regiment, which moved further north to Phú Lộc district.

By the end of 1967, US advisers to the Corps reported that Trưởng had whipped the rebellious 1st Division into one of the ARVN's best units and that Lãm, and General Nguyễn Văn Toàn, commanding the 2nd Division, had proven to be competent leaders. The allied troop commitment in the northern zone was also considerable and included two USMC divisions, one South Korean Marine brigade, and three US Army brigades that would later form the 23rd Infantry Division. By year's end, the HES reported that 56.6 percent of I Corps' population was relatively secure—well below the national average of 66.9 percent, but an 8.1 percent increase over the course of the year. The 317,000 people added to the rolls of those living in government-controlled areas represented the largest gain of any corps area in 1967. The USMC assessed that 55 percent of the population lived in secure areas, ranging from a high of 80 percent in the Phu Bai sectors to a low of 34 percent at Duc Pho.

=== 1968 ===
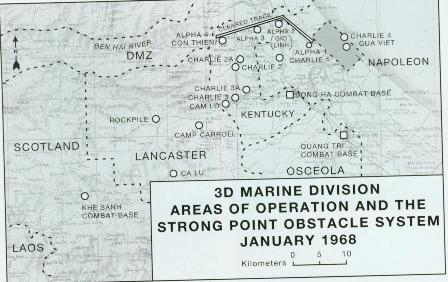
3rd Marine Division's area of operations and the strongpoint obstacle system

On 6 January, Westmoreland initiated Operation Niagara, a two-part plan to find PAVN units around Khe Sanh Combat Base and to eliminate them with superior firepower.

On 15 January, the 3rd Marine Division turned over the responsibility of the Phu Bai TAOR to the 1st Marine Division's Task Force X-Ray and the 3rd Marine Division headquarters was moved north to Dong Ha Combat Base.

On 19 January, the 1st Brigade, 1st Cavalry Division flew from Camp Radcliff in Binh Dinh province to Phu Bai Combat Base with orders to continue on to Quang Tri City as soon as possible to relieve the 3rd Marine Regiment for duty farther north. As Phu Bai could not accommodate the Brigade's over 100 helicopters, they established a base further west that became known as Landing Zone El Paso.

From 20 January to 23 November, the 3rd Marine Division conducted Operation Lancaster II along the western DMZ.

On 21 January, the PAVN began the Battle of Khe Sanh in an attempt to draw US mobile forces and South Vietnamese reserves away from more populated areas. The 37th Ranger Battalion was flown in to join the base garrison. Following a request from Westmoreland, Thieu agreed to cancel the Tết truce in northern I Corps and to reduce it to 36 hours elsewhere in the country.

Also on 21 January, Westmoreland ordered the 1st Cavalry Division commander General John J. Tolson to move the 1st Brigade, 1st Cavalry Division from LZ El Paso to Quảng Trị City to relieve the 3rd Marine Regiment and move the 3rd Brigade, 1st Cavalry Division from the Quế Sơn Valley to Camp Evans, to relieve the 1st Marine Regiment. Tolson was also given operational control of the 2nd Brigade, 101st Airborne Division, which flew into Phu Bai Combat Base from III Corps. Once repositioned, the 1st Cavalry Division was to launch Operation Jeb Stuart against PAVN base areas 101 and 114 to the west of Quảng Trị City and Huế.

From 23 to 26 January, the 3rd Battalion, 1st Marines launched Operation Badger Catch to secure the north bank of the Cua Viet river and prevent PAVN reinforcements from entering the area.

On 26 January, Westmoreland ordered the formation of a new provisional corps headquarters, MACV Forward, under the command of his deputy, General Creighton Abrams at Phu Bai.

From 29 January, the PAVN/VC began their Tet Offensive attacks in I Corps with a series of attacks around Da Nang.

On the early morning of 30 January, the V25 Local Force Battalion and the Q12 Local Force Company assaulting the headquarters of the 51st Regiment at Hoi An. The attack was stopped and at dawn the VC were forced to retreat having lost approximately 343 killed and 195 captured.

On the morning of 31 January, the 406th Sapper Battalion, the 506A Sapper Company and the C19 Local Force Company attacked the 2nd Division headquarters in the citadel of Quang Ngai City. The attack was repulsed by the afternoon with 128 VC and 31 ARVN killed. In the city itself, the 409th Sapper Battalion, the 81st Local Force Battalion, and the C95 Sapper Company overran the hospital and the jail, releasing about 900 prisoners. The ARVN recaptured the city center on the morning of 1 February with the VC losing 161 killed. The 407th Sapper Battalion, the 20th Montagnard Battalion, the 107th Anti-Aircraft Battalion, and eight local force companies attacked the airfield and the headquarters of the 4th Infantry Regiment on the west of the city. The attack was repulsed at dawn with 209 VC and six ARVN killed. An attempt to destroy the Highway bridge over the Tra Khuc River was repulsed with 144 VC and nine ARVN killed.

At Tam Ky on the morning of 31 January, the 72nd and 105th Local Force Battalions and three local force companies attacked from the east. While the 70th and the 74th Main Force Battalions and three local force companies entered the city from the north. At dawn, ARVN troops recaptured the city with help from US helicopter gunships. A search of the battlefield on the morning of 1 February found 486 VC bodies.

On the morning of 31 January, the PAVN 812th Regiment, 324th Division, 808th Main Force Battalion and 814th Main Force Battalion attacked Quang Tri. The attack was repulsed and the city was cleared by 1 February of PAVN/VC by the 1st Regiment, 1st Division, 2nd Troop, 7th Cavalry, 9th Airborne Battalion and the US 1st Brigade, 1st Cavalry Division.

On the morning of 31 January, a division-sized PAVN/VC force attacked Huế seizing most of the city. Eleven South Vietnamese battalions from the 1st Division, Airborne and Marines, four US Marine battalions and four US Army battalions would take over a month to evict the PAVN/VC and secure the city. During their occupation the PAVN/VC conducted the Massacre at Huế.

The Tet attacks had brought widespread destruction to Revolutionary Development areas in Quang Tri and Thua Thien provinces, while Quang Tin province had escaped virtually untouched.

On 6/7 February, the PAVN overran the Lang Vei Special Forces camp in an assault supported by PT-76 light tanks.

On 14 February, the 3rd Brigade, 82nd Airborne Division began arriving by air at Chu Lai Air Base and were then moved north to Phu Bai Combat Base and attached to the 101st Airborne Division.

On 17 February, the 27th Marine Regiment headquarters was established at Da Nang as part of the post-Tet Offensive reinforcements sent from the US.

From 26 February to 12 September, the 1st Marine Division's Task Force X-Ray conducted Operation Houston to reopen and secure Highway 1 between Da Nang and Phu bai Combat Base.

From 18 March to 17 May, the 1st and 2nd Brigades, 101st Airborne Division and the 3rd Brigade, 82nd Airborne Division conducted Operation Carentan in Thừa Thiên province.

From 1–14 April, the 1st Cavalry Division, 2nd Battalion, 1st Marines, 2nd Battalion, 3rd Marines, 1st Battalion, 9th Marines and the 37th Ranger Battalion conducted Operation Pegasus to relieve the siege of Khe Sanh.

From 15 April to 28 February 1969, the 3rd Marine Division conducted Operation Scotland II on the Khe Sanh plateau.

From 19 April to 17 May, the 1st Cavalry Division, 1st Brigade, 101st Airborne Division and Airborne Division conducted Operation Delaware/Lam Son 216 in the A Shau Valley.

On 28 April, the elite Hac Bao Company, 1st Division discovered the PAVN 8th Battalion, 90th Regiment, hiding in the fishing hamlet of Phuoc Yen 6 km northwest of Hue. Elements from the US 1st and 2nd Battalions, 501st Infantry, surrounded the hamlet and then annihilated the enemy unit over the next four days. PAVN losses came to 309 killed and 104 captured. Among the dead were the battalion commander, the executive officer, and three company commanders.

During their May Offensive attacks in I Corps, four PAVN Battalions occupied the area around Dai Do, north of Dong Ha starting the Battle of Dai Do from 30 April to 3 May.

On 2 May, a Regional Forces company reported PAVN soldiers in Bon Tri hamlet 6 km west of Hue, that the PAVN/VC had used as a supply station during the Tet offensive. Several companies from the 1st Battalion, 505th Infantry, helped the Hac Bao Company maul the PAVN 3rd Battalion, 812th Regiment. The PAVN withdrew after two days of fighting, leaving 121 dead. Allied losses totaled four killed.

From 4 May to 24 August, the 1st Marine Division conducted Operation Allen Brook on Go Noi Island.

On 5 May, elements of the 101st Airborne Division guarding Route 547 clashed with the PAVN 7th Battalion, 29th Regiment, near Firebase Bastogne, killing 71, while a second element from the 101st Airborne Division west of Hue drove the PAVN 7th Battalion, 90th Regiment, from the hamlet of Thon La Chu, killing 55.

On 5 May, elements of the PAVN 3rd Division ambushed a unit of the 1st Battalion, 50th Infantry Regiment (Mechanized) near An Bao in Binh Dinh province.

On 8 May, the US 1st Battalion, 6th Infantry was deployed into the hills around Landing Zone Center to destroy PAVN antiaircraft guns around the base and the 1st Squadron, 1st Cavalry, soon joined the hunt. The Battle of Landing Zone Center lasted for three weeks and resulted in 365 PAVN killed.

From 8 to 17 May, the 2nd Brigade, 1st Cavalry Division conducted Operation Concordia Square in the eastern DMZ.

On 10 May, the PAVN attacked Kham Duc and it was decided to evacuate the base, with the evacuation completed by 12 May.

On 11 May, Companies B and C, 1st Battalion, 50th Infantry, and a pair of M42 Dusters engaged the PAVN 2nd Regiment near the hamlet of Trung Hoi (2), west of LZ Uplift, killing an estimated 200 PAVN for the loss of three US killed.

From 17 May to 3 November, the 1st Cavalry Division conducted Operation Jeb Stuart III in Quảng Trị and Thừa Thiên Provinces.

From 17 May to 28 February 1969, the 101st Airborne Division and the 3rd Brigade, 82nd Airborne Division conducted Operation Nevada Eagle around Huế.

On 19 May, the 1st Brigade, 1st Cavalry Division, was in the midst of refueling its helicopters and taking on supplies when twelve 122-mm. rockets slammed into Camp Evans. The incoming rounds hit an open-air ammunition dump, igniting 3,400 tons of ordnance and causing a fire that spread to the nearby airfield, eventually damaging or destroying 124 aircraft, rendering the cavalry brigade ineffective for at least a week.

From 19 May to 23 October, the 1st Marine Division and 9th Cavalry Regiment conducted Operation Mameluke Thrust in Happy Valley southwest of Danang.

From 2 to 19 June, the 3rd Marine Division conducted Operation Robin southeast of Khe Sanh.

On 26 June, the 1st Infantry Regiment engaged the PAVN K4 Battalion, 812th Regiment in woods 8 km east of Quang Tri City, killing a reported 148 PAVN. On 27 June, the 3rd Squadron, 5th Cavalry engaged the VC 814th Local Force Battalion in the Battle of Binh An, 12 km northeast of Quang Tri City killing 225 VC and capturing 44 over the course of two days.

On 28 June, the VC killed 88 civilians in the Sơn Trà massacre.

From 1 to 8 July, the US conducted Operation Thor, a combined arms operation against PAVN positions around Mũi Lay, North Vietnam.

On 5 July, the 3rd Marine Division closed Khe Sanh Combat Base. The new COMUSMACV General Abrams believed allied interests in northern I Corps could best be served by minimizing large, static bases and by using the resources freed by closing such posts for mobile operations.

On 6 July, the Americal Division and the 2nd Division launched Operation Pocahontas Forest in the Quế Sơn Valley to search for the PAVN 1st Regiment and to preempt a possible attack on Hiep Duc.

On 14 July, the Provisional Corps was redesignated as the XXIV Corps, giving the headquarters the status of an official field force headquarters, even though it remained subordinate to III MAF. On 1 August, Lieutenant general Richard G. Stilwell became XXIV Corps commander.

In late July the 1st Brigade, 5th Infantry Division (Mechanized), arrived in northern I Corps. The brigade consisted of the 1st Battalion, 11th Infantry, the 1st Battalion, 61st Infantry (Mechanized), and the 1st Battalion, 77th Armor. Based at Dong Ha, the heavy brigade with its 148 armored personnel carriers and 67 tanks was to operate under the control of the 3rd Marine Division.

From 4–20 August, the 1st Division and the 1st Brigade, 101st Airborne Division conducted Operation Somerset Plain in the A Sầu Valley.

On 15 August, the 2nd Regiment commanded by Lieutenant colonel Vũ Văn Giai, the 11th Armored Cavalry Squadron, and the 3rd Tank Battalion conducted a raid into the southern DMZ killing a reported 421 soldiers of the PAVN 1st Battalion, 138th Regiment.

On the night of 22–23 August, as part of their Phase III Offensive the PAVN/VC attacked 36 bases, towns and cities across the Corps mainly with rocket and mortar fire. An attack at Cam Le, south of Da Nang Air Base was repulsed and the 1st Marine Division launched Operation Sussex Bay to pursue the retreating PAVN/VC. South of Da Nang, the 2nd Division and two Ranger battalions with Marine air support repulsed probing attacks from the PAVN 31st and 38th Regiments, killing almost 300 PAVN before they withdrew to their bases on Go Noi Island.

On the morning of 24 August, patrols from Troop A, 1st Squadron, 1st Cavalry Regiment engaged the PAVN 1st Regiment, 3rd Division 6 km west of Quảng Ngãi. After a four-day battle the PAVN withdrew west leaving 567 dead.

From 4 to 24 September, the 11th Infantry Brigade conducted Operation Champaign Grove in Quảng Ngãi province.

On 10 September, the 27th Marine Regiment redeployed to the US.

From 10 to 20 September, the 2nd Brigade, 101st Airborne Division and the 54th Regiment conducted Operation Vinh Loc on Vinh Loc Island, Phú Vang District.

From 28 to 30 September, the PAVN attempted to overrun the CIDG's Thường Ðức Camp. In response to this, the 1st Marine Division launched Operation Maui Peak from 1 to 19 October.

On 4 October, the 3rd Brigade, 82nd Airborne Division was released from the operation control of the 101st Airborne Division for transfer south to III Corps.

On 22 October, Abrams ordered all construction and planning efforts associated with the strongpoint obstacle system halted.

From 23 October to 6 December, the 1st Marine Division conducted Operation Henderson Hill in Happy Valley.

On 27 October, the first elements of the 1st Cavalry Division began redeploying to Quản Lợi Base Camp in III Corps.

From 20 November to 9 December, the 1st Marine Division conducted Operation Meade River in the Dodge City area south of Danang.

From 6 December to 8 March 1969, the 1st Marine Division and 1st Ranger Group conducted Operation Taylor Common in the An Hoa Basin.

From 10 December to 28 February 1969, the 1st Brigade, 5th Infantry Division (Mechanized) and the 1st Regiment conducted Operation Marshall Mountain in Trieu Phong, Mai Linh and Hai Lang districts and Quang Tri City. The operation resulted in 568 PAVN/VC killed and 397 captured, and 307 suspects captured and 496 individual and 41 crew-served weapons captured.

From 15 December to 28 February 1969, the 196th Infantry Brigade conducted Operation Fayette Canyon in "Antenna Valley", Hiệp Đức District.

On 26 December, South Vietnamese, US and Korean commanders in I Corps issued their Combined Campaign Plan for 1969. ARVN, US and Korean regulars were to focus on destruction of the PAVN/VC main forces, neutralization of base and logistical areas, and prevention of infiltration of population centers. Regional and Popular, People's Self Defense, and National Police forces were to weed out and eliminate VC local force units and infrastructure.

On 29 December, Camp Carroll was deactivated.

=== 1969 ===
Following their severe loses in the Tet, May and Phase III offensives of 1968, the PAVN/VC strategy and tactics changed from attempting to achieve an immediate victory to an attempt to win by prolonging the conflict. Large unit assaults were to be undertaken only if favorable opportunities presented themselves; small unit operations, particularly highly organized hit-and-run or sapper attacks, attacks by fire, harassment, terrorism, and sabotage would be used more extensively. The North hoped to inflict troop losses by cutting allied lines of communication, attacking base, rear service, and storage areas while conserving their military strength, defeating the pacification effort, and strengthening their negotiating position at Paris. Through such actions, the PAVN/VC hoped to maintain an aura of strength and demonstrate to the South Vietnamese populace that its government was incapable of providing security for its people.

Early 1969 saw the 3rd Marine Division assume a more mobile posture with improved helicopter support, the division moved from relatively static positions south of the DMZ and along north-south Route 1 and east-west Route 9, the main lines of communication, into the mountainous regions of Quang Tri province in search of PAVN/VC forces and bases.

From 12 January to 7 February, the 2nd and 3rd Battalions, 26th Marines conducted Operation Bold Mariner on the Batangan Peninsula.

From 22 January to 18 March, the 9th Marine Regiment conducted Operation Dewey Canyon in the A Shau and Song Đa Krông valleys.

From 23 to 27 February, the PAVN/VC conducted their Tet 1969 attacks on Da Nang, losing more than 500 killed.

On the morning of 25 February, PAVN forces attacked Firebase Neville and Firebase Russell killing 43 Marines and Navy corpsmen.

From 28 February to 8 May, the 2nd Brigade, 101st Airborne Division and elements of the 1st Division conducted Operation Massachusetts Striker in the southern A Shau Valley.

From 28 February 1971, the 11th Infantry Brigade conducted Operation Iron Mountain in Quảng Ngãi province.

From 1 March to 2 May, the 3rd Marine Division conducted Operation Purple Martin in northwest Quang Tri province.

From 15 March to 2 May, the 3rd Marine Regiment, elements of the 1st Brigade, 5th Infantry Division (Mechanized) and the 3rd Battalion, 2nd Regiment conducted Operation Maine Crag in northwest Quang Tri province.

From 18 March to 28 February 1971, the 196th Light Infantry Brigade and 5th Regiment conducted Operation Frederick Hill in Quang Tin province.

From 18 March to 28 February 1971, the 198th Light Infantry Brigade and 6th Regiment conducted Operation Geneva Park in Quảng Ngãi province.

From 23 March to 3 April, the 3rd Squadron, 5th Armored Cavalry and the 1st Battalion, 11th Infantry Regiment conducted Operation Montana Mauler north of Firebase Fuller in Quang Tri province.

On 30 March, II MAF engineers completed the construction of Liberty Bridge, which spanned the Song Thu Bon, south of Da Nang.

From 31 March to 29 May, the 1st Marine Division and 51st Regiment conducted Operation Oklahoma Hills in Quang Nam province.

From 2 May to 16 July, the 3rd Marine Regiment conducted Operation Virginia Ridge in northwest Quang Tri province.

From 10 May to 7 June, the 3rd Brigade, 101st Airborne Division and 1st and 3rd Regiments, 1st Division conducted Operation Apache Snow in the A Shau valley. During the operation the Battle of Hamburger Hill took place from 13 to 20 May.

From 15 May to 14 August, the 1st Brigade, 101st Airborne Division conducted Operation Lamar Plain in Quang Tin province.

From 26 May to 7 November, the 1st Marine Division, ROK 2nd Marine Brigade and 51st Regiment conducted Operation Pipestone Canyon on Go Noi island.

From 8 June to 15 August, the 101st Airborne Division conducted Operation Montgomery Rendezvous southwest of Huế.

From 12 June to 6 July, the 1st Battalion, 9th Marines, Companies B and C, 1st Battalion, 61st Infantry Regiment (Mechanized) and Company B 1st Battalion, 77th Armored Regiment and the 2nd Regiment conducted Operation Utah Mesa in northwest Quang Tri province.

From 29 June to 30 August, Operation Keystone Eagle saw the withdrawal of the 9th Marine Regiment, 1st Amphibian Tractor Battalion, HMM-165, VMFA-334 and the 1st Light Antiaircraft Missile Battalion from South Vietnam.

From 13 July to 15 August, the 2nd Brigade, 101st Airborne Division and 54th Regiment conducted Operation Campbell Streamer in the Bạch Mã.

From 21 July to 25 September, the 3rd Marine Regiment and two US Army battalions, conducted Operation Idaho Canyon in north-central Quảng Trị province.

From 23 July 1969 to 10 March 1971, the 198th Light Infantry Brigade conducted Operation Nantucket Beach on the Batangan Peninsula.

In August, the 1st Marine Division TAOR was extended south to cover all of Quang Nam province, which was previously split between the 1st Marine Division and the Americal Division. The 7th Marine Regiment was redeployed south to take responsibility for the Que Son valley and the 26th Marine Regiment took over part of the 7th Marines' former area of operations.

From 30 September to 27 November, Operation Keystone Cardinal saw the withdrawal of the 3rd Marine Division, HMM-265, VMA-533 and HMH-462 from South Vietnam.

From 22 October to 18 January 1970, the 1st Brigade, 5th Infantry Division (Mechanized) and elements of the 101st Airborne Division and 1st Division conducted Operation Fulton Square in the lowlands of Quảng Trị province.

From 7 December to 31 March 1970, the 2nd Brigade, 101st Airborne Division and 1st Division conducted Operation Randolph Glen in Thừa Thiên province.

On 14 December, the US, ARVN and Korean commanders issued their Combined Campaign Plan for 1970, which essentially continued the 1969 plan.

At the end of 1969, Major general Melvin Zais, commanding US XXIV Corps in I Corps, proposed breaking up the 1st Division (with four regiments and about nineteen combat battalions) into two divisions controlled by a "light corps" headquarters responsible for the defense of the DMZ area, but his immediate superior, Lieutenant general Herman Nickerson Jr. (USMC), commanding III MAF (and the I Corps senior adviser) and Lãm, both vetoed the idea, citing the lack of enough experienced Vietnamese officers to staff a new command.

=== 1970 ===
After the redeployment of the 3rd Marine Division in mid-late 1969, USMC ground operations were limited largely to Quang Nam province, where the 1st Marine Division conducted continuous small-scale combat in defense of Da Nang, and parts of Thua Thien and Quang Tin provinces.

A collection of South Vietnamese forces was loosely formed into a roughly division-level organization also tasked to defend the Da Nang TAOR. Known as Quang Da Special Zone (QDSZ), this headquarters, while not staffed sufficiently to perform division-level command and control, did exercise command by the summer 1970 of 12 infantry battalions (including the 51st Regiment) with attendant artillery and armor support. The QDSZ headquarters was at Hill 34 approximately 5 miles (8.0 km) south of Da Nang.

In the early morning of 6 January under the cover of monsoon rains, the VC 409th Battalion attacked Firebase Ross in the Que Son valley with mortars and sappers penetrating the wire. The attack was repulsed by 04:00 resulting in 13 Marines and 38 VC killed.

From 19 January to 22 July, the 1st Brigade, 5th Infantry Division (Mechanized) conducted Operation Green River in northern Quang Tri province.

From 28 January until late March, Operation Keystone Bluejay saw the withdrawal of the 26th Marine Regiment, the 3rd Amtrac Battalion, VMA-223, HMH-361, VMA-211 and MAG-12 from South Vietnam.

On 11 February, the 1st Armored Brigade and the 37th and 39th Ranger Battalions conducted Operation Duong Son 3/70 south of Hoi An which killed more than 140 VC.

On 9 March, XXIV Corps with its headquarters now at Camp Horn assumed command of all US forces in I Corps and III MAF with its headquarters now at Camp Haskins became subordinate to XXIV Corps.

From 1 April to 5 September, the 101st Airborne Division and 1st Division conducted Operation Texas Star in Quảng Trị and Thừa Thiên provinces. The operation included the Battle of Fire Support Base Ripcord from 1 to 23 July.

On the morning of 11 June, the VC 25th Main Force Battalion and the T-89th Sapper Battalion conducted the Thạnh Mỹ massacre, killing 74 civilians and destroying 156 homes.

On 2 July, President Thieu issued decrees redesignating Corps Tactical Zones as Military Regions (MRs). Under the new arrangement, I Corps became Military Region 1 (MR 1). Each corps' commander now received two deputies — a corps' deputy commander and a military region deputy commander. The corps' deputy commander would conduct major offensive operations and furnish artillery, air, and other support to the MR, while the MR deputy commander, in charge of territorial defense and pacification, would command the RFs and PFs and supervise their training and administration.

From 29 June to 1 March 1971, the 198th Light Infantry Brigade conducted Operation Pennsylvania Square in Quảng Tín province.

On 30 June, Naval Support Activity Danang was deactivated and the US Army assumed responsibility for logistics operations.

On 3 July, the Hai Lang PF Platoon, RF group 1/11 and Companies 121 and 122 and CAPs 4-3-2 and 4–1–2, located 9 km southeast of Quang Tri City, were attacked by a PAVN/VC force of unknown size. Supported by gunships and artillery, the allies killed 135 PAVN/VC and captured 74 weapons while losing 16 killed and six missing.

From 9 to 15 July, the 1st Brigade, 101st Airborne Division and 3rd Regiment conducted Operation Clinch Valley on the Khe Sanh plateau.

From 9 July into October, III MAF redeployed units as part of Operation Keystone Robin Alpha. MAG-13, VMCJ-1 and HMM-161 left South Vietnam and by September all USMC aviation units had departed Chu Lai Air Base.

From 12 July to 29 September, the 196th Infantry Brigade conducted Operation Elk Canyon around Kham Duc.

From 16 July to 24 August, the 1st Marine Division conducted Operation Pickens Forest in Quang Nam province.

From 22 July to 30 January 1971, the 1st Battalion, 11th Infantry Regiment and elements of the 1st Division conducted Operation Wolfe Mountain in Quang Tri province.

From 24 July to 11 August, the 1st Brigade, 101st Airborne Division and 3rd Regiment conducted Operation Chicago Peak in the A Shau valley.

From 9 August to 7 October, the PAVN laid siege to Firebase O'Reilly south of Quang Tri.

In August, XXIV Corps commander Lieutenant General James W. Sutherland reported that the ARVN leaders from Corps and battalion were good to excellent but "still not ready to stand on their own," and were hampered by the " lack of competent small unit leaders." Other continuing problem areas were the inability of existing engineer units to maintain roads and bases, a shortage of aerial resupply support, poor equipment maintenance, and a sluggish resupply system that still made units reluctant to turn in inoperative equipment.

From 1 September to 7 May 1971, the 1st Marine Division and ROK 2nd Marine Brigade conducted Operation Imperial Lake in the Quế Sơn District.

From 5 September, the 5th Marine Regiment took over the 7th Marine Regiment's area of operations and the ARVN and ROKMC in turn expanded their areas of operations.

From 5 September to 8 October 1971, the 101st Airborne Division and 1st Division conducted Operation Jefferson Glenn in Thua Thien province.

On 1 October, the 7th Marine Regiment formally departed South Vietnam. On 13 October, all Keystone Robin Alpha redeployments were completed, reducing III MAF's strength to 24,527.

On 15 October, the ARVN assumed control of An Hoa Combat Base.

On 29 December, XXIV Corps and MR 1 issued their Combined Campaign Plan. It placed great emphasis on continuing US redeployments and on improvement and modernization of the South Vietnamese forces so that they could "become self-sufficient and capable of assuming the entire responsibility for the conduct of the war." The plan called for increased allied efforts to protect the people and control resources, "particularly at night"; continued training of ARVN, RFs, and PFs; and the provision of "responsive" support to province chiefs in their struggle to wipe out the VC infrastructure. The most significant change was the role of US units from conducting operations on their own to supporting and assisting South Vietnamese forces.

=== 1971 ===
On 1 January, the JGS redesignated the QDSZ as the 1st Mobile Brigade Task Force under the command of Colonel Nguyễn Trọng Luật, former assistant division commander of the 2nd Division and gave it operational control of the 51st Infantry Regiment, the three-battalion 1st Ranger Group, a squadron from the 1st Armored Brigade, and the 78th and 79th Border Ranger Defense Battalions.

On 7 January, under direction from MACV, small planning groups from I Corps and XXIV Corps, working in tight secrecy, began developing a detailed concept for a raid into Laos.

On 30 January, the 1st Brigade, 5th Infantry Division (Mechanized) began Operation Dewey Canyon II to reopen Route 9 and Khe Sanh Combat Base to support future operations in Laos.

In early February, Operation Lam Sơn 719, an attack into Laos along Route 9 to sever the Ho Chi Minh Trail and destroy PAVN supply caches was launched. While the advance was initially successful, stiffening PAVN resistance, poor planning and execution and dysfunctional command and control resulted in a near-disaster. Abrams reported gloomily that the operation confirmed that Saigon "cannot sustain large scale major cross border operations... without external support."

From 3 February to 10 March in Operation Hoang Dien 103, units of III MAF, 2nd ROKMC, 51st ARVN Regiment, 146th PF Platoon, 39th RF Company, and PSDF combed the Da Nang TAOR lowlands and lowland fringes, killing 330 PAVN/VC, while losing 46 killed.

From mid to late February as part of Operation Keystone Robin Charlie, the 3rd Battalion, 5th Marines, HMM-364 and VMFA-115 departed South Vietnam.

From 10 March to 1 July, the Americal Division conducted Operation Finney Hill in Quảng Ngãi province.

From 10 March to 1 July, the Americal Division conducted Operation Middlesex Peak in Quang Tin and Quảng Ngãi provinces.

On the night of 28 March, VC sappers attacked Firebase Mary Ann, which was being transferred by the 1st Battalion, 46th Infantry Regiment to the ARVN, resulting in 33 US/ARVN killed

On the night of 29 March, PAVN/VC forces attacked Đức Dục, killing 103 civilians and kidnapping 37. PAVN/VC losses were 57 killed and three captured, while 20 RF/PF were killed.

By the end of March, the 5th Marine Regiment had departed South Vietnam and the 1st Marine Regiment had taken over its area of operations.

From April, two Vietnamese Marine brigades operated in Quang Tri province, under the operational control of the 1st Division headquarters.

On 14 April, the 3rd Marine Amphibious Brigade was activated and it assumed control of all III MAF units remaining in South Vietnam.

From 29 April to 1 July, the 196th Light Infantry Brigade conducted Operation Caroline Hill in Quảng Nam province.

On 7 May, the 3rd Marine Amphibious Brigade began standing down and all of its assigned units, including the 1st Marine Regiment, MAG-11 and MAG-16 departed South Vietnam by late June. After their departure, only 542 USMC officers and men remained in South Vietnam, most were members of Sub-Unit 1, 1st Air Naval Gunfire Liaison Company (ANGLICO). The 196th Light Infantry Brigade took over responsibility for the 1st Marine Regiment's area of operations.

On 30 May, three PAVN/VC battalions, including elements of the 38th Regiment and 91st Sapper Battalion, attacked a religious ceremony in Duy Xuyên district. The battle raged throughout the day and into the following night before the PAVN/VC fell back, leaving behind over 200 dead for allied losses of five killed.

By mid-summer, both MACV and XXIV Corps were convinced that Quang Nam was becoming militarily less secure. Abrams attributed this regression primarily to the reduction in US forces in the area, especially the removal of the Marines from Quang Nam. He also cited poor coordination between the ARVN and local forces, a lack of mobile Regional Forces in many districts, and the divisive effects of the South Vietnamese elections.

In July rather than move one of the Mekong Delta based ARVN divisions north, as recommended by General Robert E. Cushman Jr., the IV Corps senior adviser, COMUSMACV Abrams went along with JGS chief General Viên's decision to create the new 3rd Infantry Division from existing regular and territorial elements in I Corps.

On 27 August, the 1st Brigade, 5th Infantry Division (Mechanized) departed South Vietnam.

On 29 November, the Americal Division departed South Vietnam.

In December, the ROK 2nd Marine Brigade departed South Vietnam.

The 20th Tank Regiment, the first tank regiment in the ARVN, was formed at Quảng Trị equipped with the M48 Patton.

=== 1972 ===
On 27 January, a USAF gunship flying at 5,000 feet (1,500 m) above the former Khe Sanh Combat Base was shot down by an SA-2 missile.

On 10 March, the 101st Airborne Division departed South Vietnam.

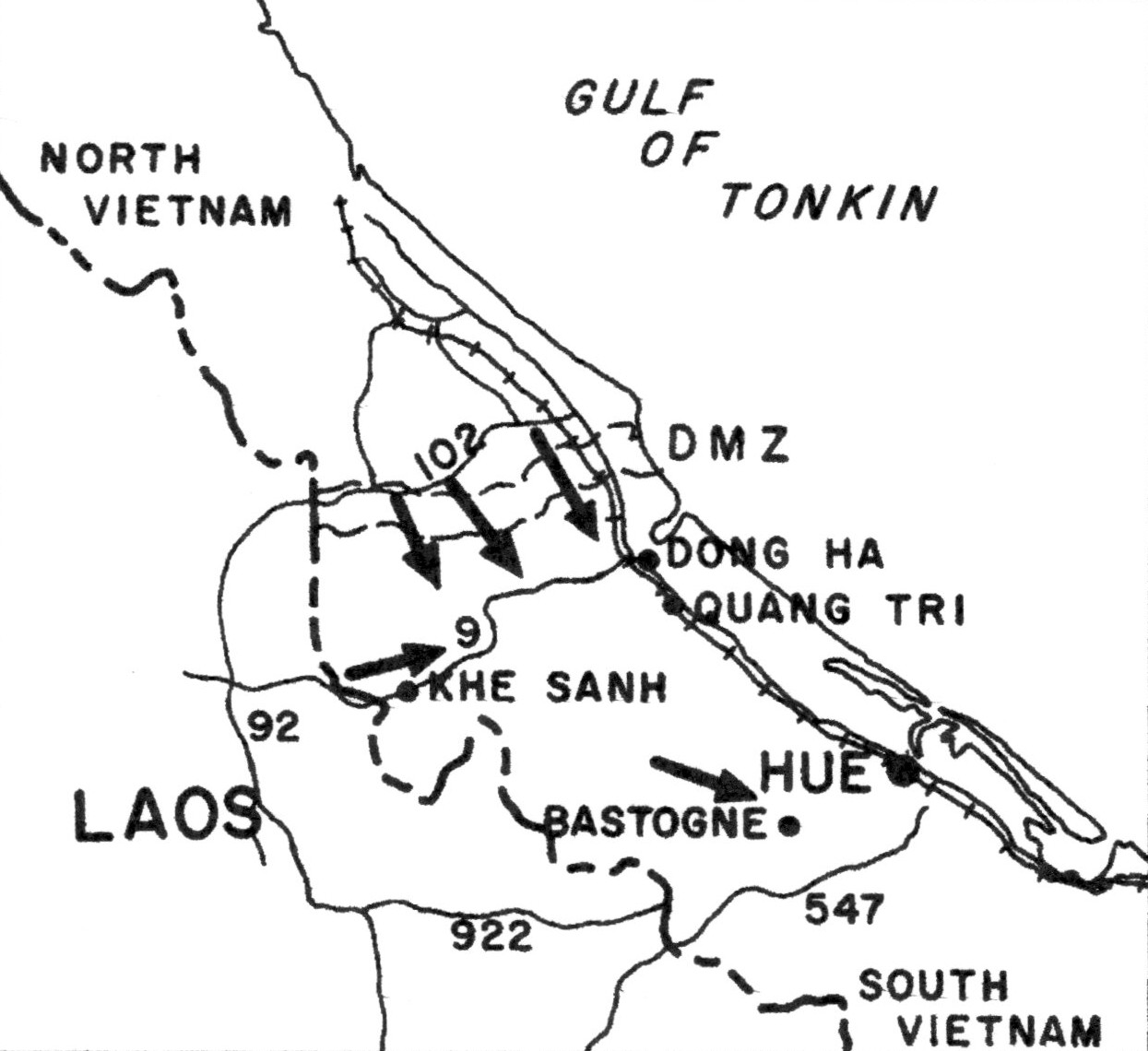
Easter Offensive in I Corps

On 30 March, the PAVN launched the Easter Offensive sending two divisions across the DMZ and one heading east from Laos, quickly overrunning several 3rd Division bases in northwest Quang Tri province and forcing the ARVN to withdraw to the Cửa Việt/Thạch Hãn River.

On 1 April, the PAVN attacked out of the A Sầu Valley heading east towards Huế.

On 2 April, during the Rescue of Bat 21 Bravo the US imposed a no-fire zone within a 27 km radius of the shootdown, restricting supporting fire to 3rd Division forces.

In early April, the Marine Division headquarters and 369th Marine Brigade were flown into Phu Bai to reinforce the 3rd Division. Marine commander Lieutenant General Le Nguyen Khang, was put in command of the defense of Huế, while his three brigades were under 3rd Division control. In addition, ARVN Ranger Command, which consisted of three groups of three battalions each, supplemented by another Ranger group from Quang Nam were also sent to Quang Tri province.

On 6 April, MAG-15 deployed to Da Nang Air Base. On 25 May, the 3rd Battalion, 9th Marines was deployed to Da Nang to provide security for the air base. MAG-15 flew combat missions from there until 20 June when they moved to Royal Thai Air Base Nam Phong, Thailand.

The 3rd Division held onto Quang Tri city until 27 April when a new PAVN thrust, confusion and conflicting orders forced 3rd Division commander Giai on 29 April to order a withdrawal to a new line on the Mỹ Chánh River, 13 km to the south.

Giai had been forced to conduct the defense with minimal support from Lãm or the Corps' headquarters. Lãm was recalled to Saigon on 2 May by Thiệu, who relieved him and his deputy Nguyễn Văn Hiếu of command. Lãm was succeeded as commander by Trưởng former commander of the 1st Division and IV Corps. Meanwhile, Giai was made a scapegoat for the debacle, court-martialled and imprisoned.

Trưởng stabilised the situation in the Battle of the Mỹ Chánh Line. In June, he launched Operation Lam Son 72 supported by USMC and US Army helicopters to recapture Quảng Trị province. By mid-September, the ARVN had recaptured Quang Tri city, but the PAVN still held most of the province.

On 30 June, XXIV Corps and I Corps Advisory Group became the First Regional Assistance Command.

From 7 October until December, the Marine Division slowly pushed the PAVN back towards the Thạch Hãn River.

=== 1973 ===
From 23 January in anticipation of the Paris Peace Accords ceasefire, PAVN/VC and South Vietnamese forces attempted to maximize the territory under their control in the War of the flags before the ceasefire came into effect.

In late January 1973 elements of the PAVN 263rd SAM Regiment, equipped with SA-2 missiles, deployed to Khe Sanh. The regiment had four firing battalions and one support battalion, each firing battalion having four to six launchers and occupying one firing site.

From 25 to 31 January, the Marine Division supported by ARVN armored forces fought the Battle of Cửa Việt to try to secure the area up to the Thạch Hãn River and the Cửa Việt Base.

At 08:00 on 28 January, the ceasefire came into effect.

On 17 February, Sub Unit One, 1st ANGLICO which had coordinated naval gunfire support in the Corps was withdrawn from South Vietnam.

On 7 April two International Commission of Control and Supervision (ICCS) helicopters, flown under contract by Air America, were shot down along Route 9 en route to Lao Bảo on the Laos frontier. One was hit by an SA-7 missile and crashed in the forest killing all nine passengers and crew, including a PAVN officer who was supposed to be guiding the flight over an approved course to Lao Bảo. The other helicopter, hit by small arms and machine gun fire, made an emergency landing without casualties.

In late July two 3rd Infantry Regiment positions west of Ngoc Ke Trai stream west of Huế were captured by the PAVN. In late August the 3rd Infantry gave up four more outposts along the Song Bo.

On 6 September the VC attacked An Tinh Hamlet in Son Tinh District destroying 322 houses.

On 12 October the PAVN attacked the RF outpost on the summit of Bạch Mã forcing their withdrawal.

In November the 3rd Infantry Regiment conceded more positions west of Ngoc Ke Trai indicating declining morale within the 1st Division. On 15 December another attack on a 3rd Infantry company caused the unit to flee in panic after taking light casualties.

On the night of 17 December, the VC 95th Sapper Company infiltrated the 68th Ranger Battalion command post in Binh Son District causing over 50 casualties and capturing a large amount of weapons and equipment.

On 25 December PAVN/VC sappers blew up the Tra Can Bridge in Duc Pho District. On 26 December sappers blew up the Sa Bau Bridge south of Tam Ky.

=== 1974 ===
From 18 July to 4 October, the 3rd Division and elements of the 12th and 14th Ranger Groups fought the PAVN 2nd Division in the Battle of Duc Duc.

From 29 July to 11 November, the 3rd Division, Airborne Division and 12th Ranger Group fought five PAVN regiments in the Battle of Thượng Đức.

On 17 August the PAVN 52nd Brigade supported by artillery overran the two RF companies defending Minh Long district. A three battalion ARVN relief force failed to break through.

From 28 August to 10 December, the 1st Division fought five PAVN regiments in the Battle of Phú Lộc.

On 19 September the PAVN began bombarding the 70th Ranger Battalion at Gia Vuc followed shortly by ground assaults. Five outposts fell, but the Rangers moved out quickly and retook three of them. Without artillery support or airstrikes due to bad weather and losing 50 men killed and as many wounded, the battalion was unable to hold. The camp fell on 21 September and only 21 survivors eventually made it back to ARVN lines.

On 21 September, a PAVN battalion attacked the 5th and 8th VNMC Battalions and 61st Ranger Battalion holding the Phong Điền district north of Huế . After a bombardment of 6,600 rounds of mixed artillery and mortar rounds, the PAVN launched their ground attack. The VNMC and Rangers stopped the PAVN infantry killing 247 with artillery and small arms fire, after which they withdrew.

On 1 October the 4th Infantry Regiment, 2nd Division tried to recover terrain lost to the PAVN south of Nghĩa Hành district. Well entrenched, the PAVN had even moved a battery of 37mm antiaircraft guns to within 4 km of the district town, but the guns were soon destroyed by ARVN artillery. The PAVN force blocking the 4th Infantry's advance included three battalions of the PAVN 52nd Brigade. The 4th Infantry took heavy casualties, but made no significant gains.

=== 1975 ===
At the beginning of the year, MR1 fielded three infantry divisions (the 1st, 2nd and 3rd), the elite Airborne and Marine Divisions, four Ranger Groups and the 1st Armored Brigade.

In early January, taking advantage of a lull in fighting, Trưởng adjusted his forces pulling the 2nd Airborne Brigade out of the line west of Huế and placing it in reserve in Phu Loc District. Although the 147th Marine Brigade assumed responsibility for the sector vacated by the 2nd, the defenses west of Huế were dangerously thin. The Marine Division itself pulled two battalions out of forward positions northwest of Huế to constitute a heavier reserve and, further thinning the force, sent one company from each battalion to Saigon to form a new Marine brigade for the JGS reserve. Later in the month, Marine positions in Quang Tri were taken over by RF battalions, and three marine battalions were shifted south to Thua Thien province.

Near the border of Nghia Hanh and Mo Duc Districts a six-week 2nd Division clearing operation against the PAVN 52nd Brigade, the division inflicted serious casualties. In late January, the 3rd Division conducted a successful six-day foray into contested ground in Duy Xuyen and Que Son Districts of Quang Nam province, again causing high casualties.

After Tết the PAVN 324B Division concentrated south of Huế, giving up its positions in the Song Bo corridor. The 325th Division was relieved on the My Chanh line by local units and was apparently moving into Thua Thien province. The 341st Division, having been converted from a territorial and training unit to a line infantry division, crossed the DMZ into South Vietnam.

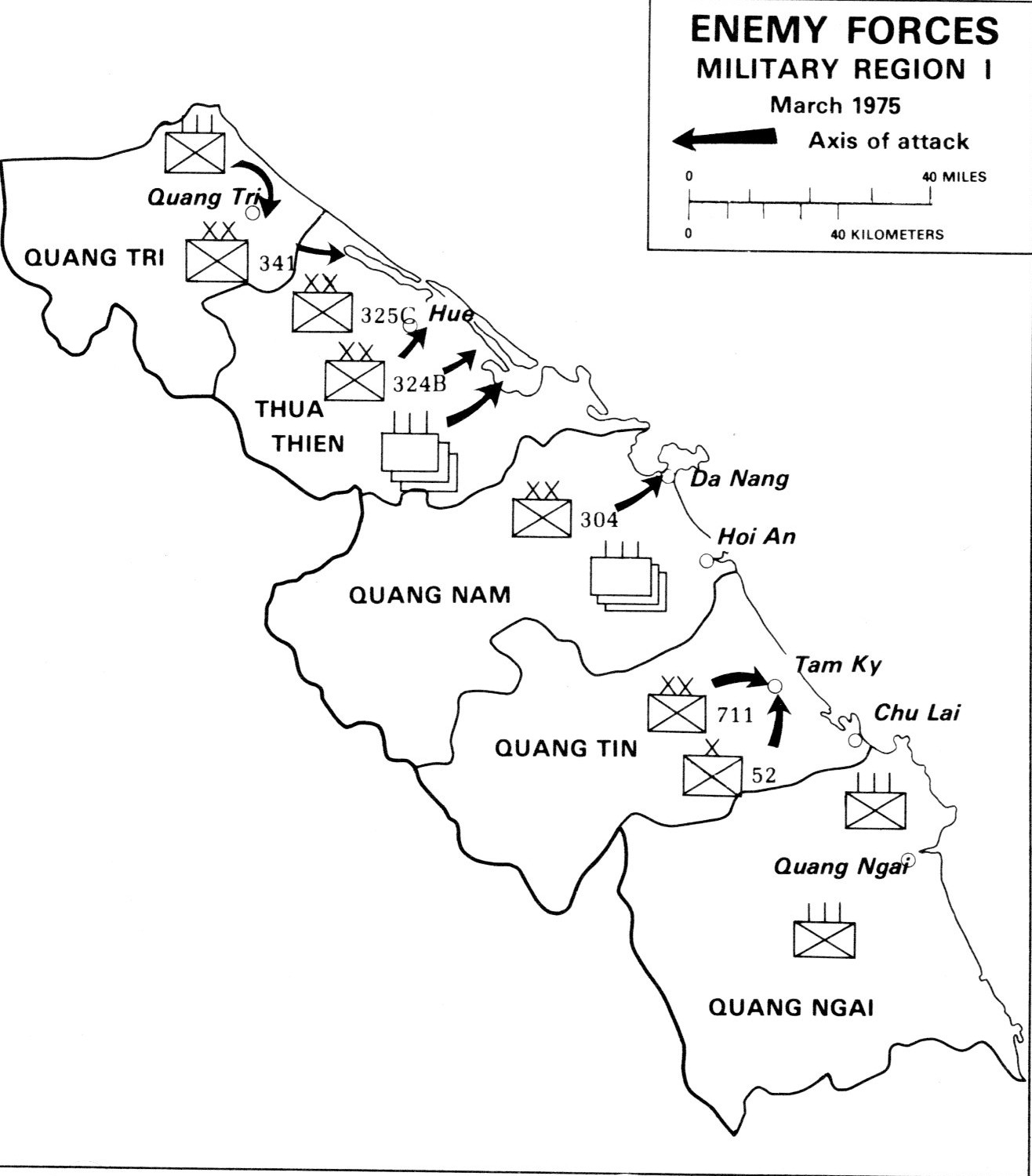
Initial phase of PAVN offensive in I Corps

On 8 March, major fighting erupted when PAVN/VC forces attacked and occupied some 15 hamlets in southern Quang Tri and northern Thua Thien provinces, starting the Hue–Da Nang Campaign of the 1975 Spring Offensive. Over 100,000 refugees, nearly the entire population of Quang Tri province, fled south to Huế.

At least 20 tanks accompanied the PAVN assault in the Song Bo corridor where the Marine Division had its 147th Brigade and the 130th RF Battalion. The attacks continued for two days and one marine position was lost but the 4th Marine Battalion recovered it on 11 March. In two days of heavy fighting, with moderate marine casualties, the 147th Brigade killed more than 200 PAVN, destroyed two tanks and damaged seven, and captured many weapons.

A battalion of the PAVN 6th Regiment infiltrated through Phu Loc to Vinh Loc District. There they attacked Vinh Hien Village on the southern tip of the island and swept north to attack Vinh Giang. Some of the battalion pushed into Phu Thu District east of Huế. The 8th Airborne Battalion, reinforced with two companies of the 1st Battalion, 54th Infantry, and a troop of armored cavalry, moved against the PAVN battalion and badly mauled and dispersed it. On 16 March a unit of the 54th Infantry ambushed a remnant of the battalion south of Huế, killing the battalion commander, his staff, and 20 men.

In southern MR1, the PAVN 2nd Division and 52nd Brigade attacked and overran the district capitals at Hau Duc and Tien Phuoc and threatened Tam Ky. On 12 March, Thieu ordered Trưởng to release the Airborne Division for redeployment from the Da Nang area to Saigon. At the same time, he ordered Trưởng to give top priority within MR1 to the defense of Da Nang. Trưởng strongly opposed the decision to remove the Airborne Division. The next day, he flew to Saigon to argue personally against such a move, but to no avail, gaining only a four-day postponement. The withdrawal would begin on 17 March. On 19 March, Thieu authorized the 1st Airborne Brigade to remain at Da Nang on the condition it not be committed to combat and the defense of MR 1. To replace the departing units, Thieu ordered the newly formed 468th Marine Brigade to Da Nang.

To compensate for the loss of the Airborne brigades, Trưởng ordered the Marine Division to redeploy from its position near Huế to the Da Nang area. In the midst of confusion over the defensive strategy and the growing civilian panic, PAVN forces crossed the Thach Han River, attacked and occupied the ruins of Quang Tri City. The South Vietnamese forces resisted and then fell back on 19 March. Trưởng was recalled to Saigon on 19 March to brief Thiệu on his withdrawal plan. Trưởng had developed two contingency plans: the first was predicated on government control of Highway 1, which would be utilized for two simultaneous withdrawals from Huế and Chu Lai to Da Nang; the second presupposed PAVN interdiction of the highway and called for a withdrawal into three enclaves: Huế, Da Nang, and Chu Lai. This was to be only an interim measure, however, since the forces that withdrew to Huế and Chu Lai would then be sea-lifted to Da Nang by the navy. Thieu then stunned Trưởng by announcing that he had misinterpreted his previous orders, Huế was not to be abandoned, and the Marine Division was to be withdrawn from MR1 to reconstitute the general reserve.

The PAVN halted at the My Chanh Line and then moved the weight of their assault to the west and south of Huế. Early on the morning of 21 March the lead battalions of the 324B and 325th Divisions, together with the independent Tri-Thien Regiment, with heavy artillery support, assaulted South Vietnamese positions from the Bo Corridor to Phu Loc. Heavy artillery fire fell on Huế.

On 22 March, after back and forth fighting over Nui Bong near Phu Loc, the PAVN captured the mountain allowing them to interdict Highway 1. The population of Huế declined to only 50,000, and the Hai Van Pass was clogged with desperate people trying to escape south with more than 100,000 refugees inundating Da Nang.

On 23 March the 913th RF Group started an unauthorized withdrawal from the My Chanh Line causing panic among other forces and a general rout developed.

At 18:00 on 24 March, with the PAVN closing in on Huế, Trưởng decided to abandon Huế and evacuate as many troops as possible along the Phú Vang district a narrow coastal sandspit east of Highway 1, where they could move without restriction until reaching the evacuation column north of Hai Van Pass. The effort proved futile, and as panic grew, the withdrawal, compounded by PAVN pressure became a rout.

On 24 March, Quang Ngai and Tam Ky fell to the PAVN. On 25 March, the PAVN captured Hoi An.

On the night of 25 March the sealift from Chu Lai began. Panic quickly took over as soldiers fought for places on the first boats. Sufficient order was restored, however, to move about 7,000 soldiers up to Da Nang. The remnants of the 4th Infantry and the almost nonexistent 6th Infantry were regrouped on Ly Son Island, while the 12th Ranger Group, down to only 500 men, and the few remaining soldiers of the 5th Infantry, were assembled near Da Nang.

This left Da Nang as the last line of defense. The massive influx of civilian refugees into the Da Nang area precipitated a breakdown in law and order. Attempts to establish a defensive perimeter around the city met with little success, and on 30 March, by now in total chaos, Da Nang collapsed with barely a shot being fired. Trưởng and his staff swam to a boat and were evacuated to Saigon and the PAVN occupied all of MR1 which ceased to exist.

== Divisions ==
1st Infantry Division

2nd Infantry Division

3rd Infantry Division
