= Operation Fulton Square =

Part of the Vietnam War (1969–1970)

- Part of the Vietnam War
Date	22 October 1969 – 18 January 1970
Location	eastern Quảng Trị Province, South Vietnam

Belligerents
United States; South Vietnam	North Vietnam

Commanders and leaders
Melvin Zais	

Units involved
(United States) 1st Brigade, 5th Infantry Division (Mechanized); 101st Airborne Division (South Vietnam) 1st Infantry Division	27th Regiment

Casualties and losses
28 killed	US body count: 384 killed

Operation Fulton Square was a joint U.S. Army and Army of the Republic of Vietnam (ARVN) military operation during the Vietnam War to engage People's Army of Vietnam (PAVN) units in the lowlands of Quảng Trị Province.

== Background ==
On 22 October 1969 control of the 1st Brigade, 5th Infantry Division (Mechanized) passed from the 3rd Marine Division to XXIV Corps and the 1st Brigade assumed responsibility, together with the ARVN 1st Infantry Division for the defense of Quảng Trị Province as the 3rd Marine Division withdrew from South Vietnam in Operation Keystone Cardinal. On that date the 1st Brigade launched Operation Fulton Square into the PAVN base areas of the Triệu Phong, Hải Lăng, Gio Linh and Mai Linh Districts.

== Operation ==
The Brigade's mission was to conduct reconnaissance-in-force, search and clear and rice denial operations in support of the South Vietnamese government's accelerated pacification program.

On 11 November the entire 1st Battalion, 61st Infantry Regiment, reinforced by Company D, 1st Battalion, 11th Infantry Regiment and Company A, 1st Battalion, 77th Armor Regiment, made contact with a large element of the PAVN 27th Regiment. By 13 November, the 2nd Battalion, 501st Infantry Regiment, 101st Airborne Division and the ARVN 5th Battalion, 2nd Regiment were also committed to the battle. On 15 November another ARVN battalion was committed to further exploit the situation. By 20 November 253 PAVN had been killed and the 27th Regiment was in retreat.

On the night of 20 December an element of the 1st Brigade received small arms, automatic weapons and Rocket-propelled grenade (RPG) fire from an estimated PAVN platoon 6 miles (9.7 km) northeast of Dong Ha Combat Base, near the north bank of the Cua Viet River. The troopers returned fire with unit weapons, and a short while later, helicopter gunships and a U.S. Navy Patrol Boat, River (PBR) moved to the area and engaged the PAVN in support of the ground force. The gunships received ground fire from the PAVN during the action. The PAVN eventually withdrew with unknown losses, U.S. casualties were 19 wounded.

On 1 January 1970 an element of the 1st Brigade in night defensive positions 6 miles (9.7 km) northeast of Dong Ha Combat Base was attacked by an estimated 15-30 PAVN using small arms, automatic weapons, RPGs and Satchel charges. The unit fired back with unit weapons and were supported by helicopter gunships and PBRs. At 04:10 the PAVN withdrew without having penetrated the perimeter. The bodies of 16 PAVN were found in the vicinity together with 11 individual weapons, two RPG-7 grenade launchers, two mines, 49 hand grenades and 75 pounds of plastic explosives. U.S. casualties were two wounded.

On 5 January at 10:15 a U.S. Army combat support convoy was ambushed by an unknown size PAVN force while moving on a road 9 miles (14 km) south southeast of Quảng Trị. The PAVN employed small arms, automatic weapons and RPG fire. The troopers fired back with unit weapons and the PAVN withdrew with unknown losses. U.S. casualties were two killed and nine wounded.

== Aftermath ==
PAVN losses were 384 killed. The operation was immediately followed by Operation Green River covering the same area.
