= Vĩnh Định =

- Interactive map of Vĩnh Định
- Coordinates: 16.748624515900897°N 107.27047652504871°E
- Country: Vietnam
- Region: North Central Coast
- Province: Quảng Trị
- Established: 16 June 2025

Area
  - Total: 63.85 km^{2} (24.65 sq mi)

Population (31 December 2024)
  - Total: 26,737
  - Density: 418/km^{2} (1,080/sq mi)

Vĩnh Định is a commune in Quảng Trị province, Vietnam.

== History ==
The area of present-day Vĩnh Định commune was formerly part of Hải Lăng district, Quảng Trị province.

On 17 December 2019, the Standing Committee of the National Assembly of Vietnam issued Resolution No. 832/NQ-UBTVQH14 on the arrangement of commune-level administrative units in Quảng Trị province, which took effect on 1 January 2020. Under the resolution, the entire area and population of Hải Xuân and Hải Vĩnh communes were merged to form Hải Hưng commune.

On 14 November 2024, the Standing Committee of the National Assembly of Vietnam issued Resolution No. 1281/NQ-UBTVQH15 on the arrangement of commune-level administrative units in Quảng Trị province for the 2023–2025 period. Under the resolution, Hải Quế and Hải Ba communes were merged to form Hải Bình commune.

On 16 June 2025, the Standing Committee of the National Assembly of Vietnam issued Resolution No. 1680/NQ-UBTVQH15 on the arrangement of commune-level administrative units in Quảng Trị province in 2025. Under the resolution, the entire area and population of Hải Quy, Hải Hưng, and Hải Bình communes, formerly part of Hải Lăng district, were merged to form a new commune named Vĩnh Định.
