= Operation Green River =

Part of the Vietnam War (1970)

- Part of the Vietnam War
Date	19 January – 22 July 1970
Location	northern Quảng Trị Province, South Vietnam
Result	US operational success

Belligerents
United States	North Vietnam

Units involved
1st Brigade, 5th Infantry Division	

Casualties and losses
37 killed	US body count: 106 killed 24 individual and 9 crew-served weapons recovered

Operation Green River was a security operation during the Vietnam War conducted by the 1st Brigade, 5th Infantry Division in Quảng Trị Province from 19 January to 22 July 1970.

== Background ==
The operation consisted of search and clear, reconnaissance in force and ambush operations throughout the Brigade's tactical area of responsibility (TAOR). The manoeuvre battalions of the Brigade directed their efforts towards strengthening fire support bases and strong points and improving the security of key installations throughout the province. In addition several joint operations wore conducted to the west to increase security and control along the western frontier.

== Operation ==
The 1st Battalion, 11th Infantry Regiment conducted search and clear, reconnaissance in force, firebase defense, rocket suppression and security operations in AO Green, Hải Lăng District and Firebase Fuller. Task Force 1st Battalion, 61st Infantry Regiment performed the mission of providing security for Firebases C2 and A4 and conducted search and clear and reconnaissance in force operations in AO Orange. Task Force 1st Battalion, 77th Armor Regiment provided security of the Cửa Việt Base including patrols and ambushes north of the Cua Viet River until 9 July 1970. Also during the period TF 1/77th conducted reconnaissance in force, rocket suppression and search and clear mission in AO Blue. Joint operations of a similar nature were conducted with nine Popular Force platoons and six Regional Force companies in Hải Lăng and Triệu Phong Districts. Following the completion of that mission the battalion was assigned the mission of securing the engineers in reopening of Route 556 through the Ba Long Valley. This effort reestablished government control in the Ba Long Valley, long one of the major infiltration routes into the populated areas of the central piedmont and coastal lowlands. Task Force 3rd Battalion, 5th Infantry Regiment was responsible for extensive security missions in AO White, Dong Ha Combat Base, Mai Loc Camp and Cam Lộ Combat Base subsectors. These missions were accomplished through extensive reconnaissance in force, and search and clear operations.

On 4 May Company D, 1/11th Infantry, while securing Firebase Fuller, received thirty-two 120 mm mortar rounds, resulting in one US killed. On 10 May Company D, 1/11th handed responsibility for Firebase Fuller to the Army of the Republic of Vietnam (ARVN) 2nd Regiment, 1st Division and departed the base on foot. While approaching Firebase Khe Gio they received sniper and mortar fire and a medevac UH-1H crashed into the column killing the four crewmen and two soldiers from D, 1/11th. From 6 May to 8 May, TF 3/5th provided route and firebase security from Cam Lộ along Route 9 to Ca Lu Combat Base where a joint US/ARVN fire support operation was being conducted in the area of Firebases Langly and Tun Tavern (16.567°N 106.935°E). On 28 May Company A, 1/77th, encountered a PAVN squad and in 45 minutes had killed five PAVN. On 31 May Company A, 1/61st made contact with a PAVN platoon killing three.

Throughout the period until 23 June, TF 3/5th provided security for 59th Land Clearing Company near Mai Loc. From 24 June to 7 July, TF 3/5th provided security for the 14th Engineer Battalion in reconstructing Route 558 from Mai Loc to Firebase Holcomb (16.664°N 106.982°E). This road opened FSB Holcomb to access by self-propelled artillery providing artillery support for units in the Ba Long and Đa Krông Valleys. On 29 June 2 platoons from Company C, 1/61st and Company A, 1/77th were ambushed by a PAVN platoon, the attack was repulsed with three US killed and 2 PAVN killed.

From 7 to 21 July, TF 1/77th provided security for three artillery units at Vandegrift Combat Base while they supported joint US/ARVN ground operations around Khe Sanh in response to air cavalry contacts. On 15 July Company B, 1/77th was escorting a convoy when it received Rocket-propelled grenade (RPG) fire, the firing location was attacked by gunships and artillery and a lone PAVN soldier then attacked the convoys with RPGs before being killed, US losses were one killed. On 19 July while sweeping northwest of Firebase Holcomb, Company D, 1/11th engaged five PAVN killing four including an officer. That evening cooking fires were observed and artillery fire called in resulting in two secondary explosions.

== Aftermath ==
The operation concluded on 22 July 1970. US losses were 37 killed, PAVN losses were 106 killed with 24 individual and 9 crew-served weapons captured.
