= Charlie 2 =

Charlie 2
- Đông Hà, Quảng Trị province in Vietnam
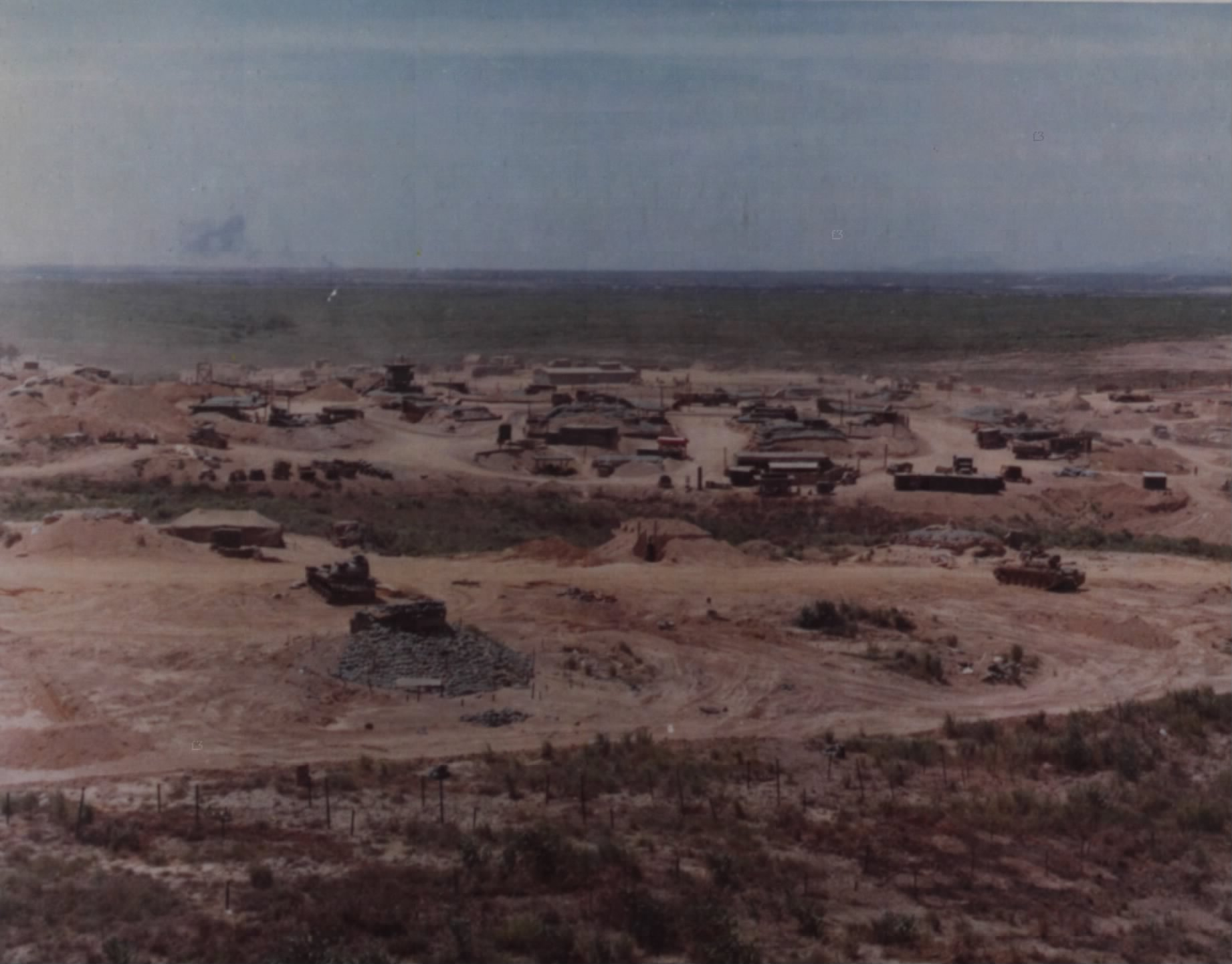
- Charlie 2, 3 June 1970

Site information
- Type: Marines/Army base
- Operator: Army of the Republic of Vietnam (ARVN); United States Marine Corps; United States Army (U.S. Army)
- Condition: Abandoned

Location
- Shown within Vietnam
- Coordinates: 16.855°N 107.005°E

Site history
- Built: 1966
- In use: 1966-1972
- Battles/wars: Vietnam War; Battle of Con Thien; Easter Offensive

Garrison information
- Garrison: 3rd Marine Division; 1st Brigade, 5th Infantry Division (Mechanized)

Charlie 2 (also known as C-2, Combat Base C-2, C-2 Strongpoint and Firebase Charlie 2) is a former U.S. Marine Corps, U.S. Army and Army of the Republic of Vietnam (ARVN) firebase north of Đông Hà in central Vietnam.

== History ==
=== 1966-7 ===
The base was established 12.5 km northwest of Đông Hà and 5 km southeast of Con Thien to protect the land route to Con Thien and particularly the C-2 bridge immediately north of the base.

By December 1967 all bunkers at C-2 had been completed and all minefields laid and perimeter barbed wire emplaced.

The Marines constructed Route 561 linking Con Thien to Route 9.

=== 1968–9 ===
During 1968 further improvements were made to the bunker system at C-2, totalling 81 reinforced bunkers.

In August 1969, responsibility for C-2 passed from the Marines to the 1st Brigade, 5th Infantry Division (Mechanized).

=== 1970-2 ===
On 21 May 1971 30 US infantrymen, many from Company A, 1st Battalion, 61st Infantry Regiment, were killed when a People's Army of Vietnam (PAVN) 122mm rocket hit their bunker at Charlie 2.

On 1 April 1972 in the face of the PAVN's Easter Offensive the base was abandoned by the ARVN.

== Current use ==
The base has been turned over to farmland.
