= Vũ Văn Giai =

- Born: 12 May 1934; Nam Định, Vietnam
- Died: 13 October 2012 (aged 78); Orange, California, United States
- Military career
- Allegiance: State of Vietnam; South Vietnam
- Branch: Vietnamese National Army; Army of the Republic of Vietnam
- Rank: Brigadier general
- Commands: 3rd Division
- Conflicts: Vietnam War: First Battle of Quảng Trị

Brigadier general Vũ Văn Giai (12 May 1934 – 13 October 2012) was a general in the South Vietnamese Army of the Republic of Vietnam (ARVN).

== Military career ==
In January 1968 Giai, then a Major, commanded the 2nd Regiment of the 1st Division. He was described as "an impressive officer with a good command of English." His regiment was responsible for the A-1 and A-2 strongpoints and the C-1 base area of the McNamara Line on the eastern end of the Vietnamese Demilitarized Zone (DMZ) in northern Quảng Trị province.

On 8 August, two battalions of the 2nd Regiment engaged elements of the People's Army of Vietnam (PAVN) 1st Battalion, 138th Regiment, 2 km east of A-2 and 2.5 km south of the DMZ. As the engagement intensified during the afternoon, Giai committed the remaining two battalions of the regiment. Despite receiving more than 150 rounds of mixed artillery and mortar fire, the ARVN battalions pressed the attack, supported by artillery and tactical airstrikes. Suffering more than 100 casualties the PAVN battalion withdrew northward under the cover of darkness after the six-hour battle.

On 15 August Giai planned and coordinated a raid by the 2nd Regiment, the 11th Armored Cavalry Squadron, and the 3rd Tank Battalion into the southern DMZ to attack the PAVN 1st Battalion, 138th Regiment. The task force moved up the beach to the northernmost point of advance without detection and then turned west, moving from the beach into an area composed of abandoned rice paddies. Although a number of tracked vehicles and tanks became mired in the swampy ground, 10 tanks continued to sweep northwest toward the Bến Hải River and then south, where they surprised the PAVN "who were eating breakfast." After preplanned B-52 Arclight strikes and under covering artillery and tank fire, the allied task force eventually overran the well-entrenched PAVN command post, supported by its own 105mm artillery. Marine tankers described the day's action as a "turkey shoot," with 421 PAVN reported killed.

Giai was later promoted to deputy commander of the 1st Division. From 16 April to October 1971 he commanded division elements in Operation Lam Son 720 against PAVN bases in the A Sầu Valley. In June 1971 Giai was responsible for the division’s actions around Firebase Fuller.

Giai was appointed as the original commander of the 3rd Division on its formation in November 1971.

In an interview with The New York Times in early February 1972 Giai and 1st Division commander General Phạm Văn Phú expressed doubts about the widely anticipated PAVN offensive in the northern provinces in mid-February, stating that no major action would take place until March at the earliest due to the need for the PAVN to build up their logistics.

Following the defeat of the 3rd Division in the First Battle of Quảng Trị in April 1972 Giai was made a scapegoat for the loss of Quảng Trị Province. While the new I Corps commander General Ngô Quang Trưởng wanted to keep him as commander of the 3rd Division he was overruled by President Nguyễn Văn Thiệu. On 3 May he was relieved of command and placed under investigation. A U.S. official stated at the time that he "was just overwhelmed by the problems that he faced in the invasion."

On 2 October 1973 Giai was found guilty of abandoning his post by a military court and was sentenced to five years' hard labor.
