= Operation Champaign Grove =

Part of the Vietnam War (1968)

- Part of the Vietnam War
Date	4–24 September 1968
Location	Quảng Ngãi Province, South Vietnam
Result	US operational success

Belligerents
United States	North Vietnam (Provisional Revolutionary Government of the Republic of South Vietnam) Viet Cong

Units involved
11th Infantry Brigade	3rd Division

Casualties and losses
41 killed	378 killed

Operation Champaign Grove was a security operation during the Vietnam War conducted by elements of the 11th Infantry Brigade in Quảng Ngãi Province from 4 to 24 September 1968.

== Background ==
Task Force Galloway was to conduct combat operations to find and destroy elements of the People’s Army of Vietnam (PAVN) 3rd Division, interdict supply routes to Quảng Ngãi and eliminate the threat of attacks on Quảng Ngãi.

== Operation ==
On 4 September 4th Battalion, 3rd Infantry Regiment conducted air assaults into landing zones north of the Trà Khúc River. Company C, 4/3rd Infantry killed one Viet Cong (VC) north of the landing zone and the Battalion’s command and control helicopter killed 3 VC. 3rd Battalion, 1st Infantry Regiment conducted combat assaults and joined up with elements of the 1st Squadron, 1st Cavalry Regiment operating west of Quảng Ngãi. They discovered the graves of four VC killed earlier by helicopters.

On 5 September Company D, 4/3rd Infantry was attacked by PAVN/VC and Aero-scouts were called in to support. The Battalion’s command and control helicopter was shot down as it attempted to evacuate a wounded soldier resulting in one crewman being killed. Artillery fire was called in and the PAVN/VC broke contact.

On 6 September a Company B, 4/3rd Infantry ambush killed one VC. Recon Company engaged a PAVN Company, calling in artillery and gunship support, resulting in 43 PAVN killed and 11 US killed in the two-hour battle at grid reference BS548773 (15.16°N 108.718°E). Aero-scouts engaged 10 VC, killing all 10 and capturing three weapons and later gunships killed a further VC. Company A, 3/1st Infantry killed two VC and captured two AK-47s at a tunnel complex. Company B, 3/1st Infantry killed two VC and Troop E, 1st Cavalry killed one VC. A 174th Aviation Company gunship killed one VC and an Aero-scout helicopter killed another.

On 7 September an Aero-scout supporting 4/3rd Infantry killed two VC. Companies A and B, 3/1st Infantry supported by Aero-scouts engaged VC in a tunnel complex at grid reference BS550758 (15.146°N 108.72°E) in an eight-hour battle, killing 26 VC for the loss of one US killed.

On 8 September the 4/3rd Infantry command and control helicopter observed one dead VC, while supporting gunships killed three VC.

On 9 September Company A, 4/3rd Infantry engaged seven VC killing two, Company B received sniper fire and killed three VC and the Battalion command and control helicopter was shot down. 3/1st Infantry engaged a VC near their perimeter killing him and capturing his AK-47 and Company B later killed another VC.

On 10 September Company C, 4/3rd Infantry found one dead VC later found three weapons. Company A, 3/1st Infantry killed three PAVN in a sweep of a landing zone, Company B found one dead VC and an AK-47, Aero-scouts engaged 15 PAVN, killing eight and a Company C air-assault was fired on resulting in one pilot killed. Aero-scouts later found one PAVN dead in a river.

On 11 September Company B, 4/3rd Infantry found three VC killed by air. A mortar attack on Companies A and B, 3/1st Infantry night defensive positions killed two US personnel.

On 12 September Company B, 4/3rd Infantry located a buried 105mm howitzer. Company A, 3/1st infantry engaged a PAVN force killing three and capturing one AK-47 for the loss of one US killed and later found another AK-47 and an RPG-2. Company C received 122mm rocket fire resulting in one US killed. Aero-scouts engaged several groups of VC killing nine and capturing one.

On 13 September the 1st Squadron, 1st Cavalry with Company B, 1st Battalion, 46th Infantry Regiment attached, came under the operational control of Task Force Galloway with the unit marching west from Quảng Ngãi. Troop A was engaged by a well-entrenched PAVN force and other units moved up to support Troop A in fighting that continued until dusk. Aero-scouts killed five VC and four PAVN.

On 14 September Company A, 4/3rd Infantry killed one VC and found four PAVN graves. Company C found a cave complex containing eight individual and one crew-served weapon and ammunition and equipment. Troops A and C, 1/1st Cavalry and Company B, 1/46th Infantry swept the area of the previous day’s battle and were engaged by PAVN at grid location BS522750 (15.139°N 108.694°E) with cumulative losses for the two days of 112 PAVN killed and 17 individual and 11 crew-served weapons captured for US losses of three killed and one armored vehicle destroyed.

On 15 September 4/3rd Infantry left the operation and was replaced by the 1st Battalion, 20th Infantry Regiment, while other units temporarily stood down.

On 17 September Company C, 3/1st Infantry received heavy automatic weapons fire and returned fire killing five PAVN. A Company A, 1/20th Infantry squad ambush was overrun by a PAVN platoon resulting in four US killed, the rest of Company A pursued the attackers killing three PAVN and capturing an AK-47 and an RPG. Company A then found a tunnel containing two AK-47s and one RPD. Aero-scouts killed two VC and captured one weapon.

On 18 September Company A, 3/1st infantry killed four VC. Company D, 1/20th Infantry killed two PAVN and captured one AK-47, Recon Company grenade a tunnel complex killing two VC and capturing two. Company C killed one PAVN. Company D was ambushed in a valley at grid location BS350695 (15.087°N 108.534°E) and pinned down until dusk when the PAVN/VC broke contact resulting in 10 US killed.

On 19 September Company B, 3/1st Infantry killed one VC. Companies A, B & C 1/20th Infantry swept the scene of the previous day’s battle finding 31 PAVN killed by airstrikes and artillery. Company D found a further 10 dead PAVN.

On 20 September Company D, 3/1st Infantry had one soldier killed by sniper fire. Aero-scouts killed one VC.

On 21 September Company C, 1/20th Infantry killed one VC and Company B killed six VC.

On 22 September 3/1st Infantry left the operation. Three 1/20th Infantry observations posts near Ha Thanh Camp (15.096°N 108.564°E) came under fire and ground attack and Company A was tasked with relieving the observation posts. Company A killed three PAVN and lost one killed. The Battalion command & control helicopter was hit by an RPG and made a forced landing at Ha Thanh Camp. Company A assaulted a hill position killing four PAVN and was then engaged by a heavy fire and killed a further 10 PAVN and captured three AK-47s and two crew-served weapons in a 2.5 hour battle. In the afternoon Company A attacked a PAVN bunker complex killing 15 PAVN and capturing 10 weapons and various ammunition and equipment.

On 23 September 1/20th Infantry left the operation. A gunship supporting the operation was shot down and Aero-scouts sent to cover its recovery killed six VC.

== Aftermath ==
The operation concluded on 24 September 1968, US losses were 41 killed, while PAVN/VC losses were 378 killed.
