= Firebase Neville =

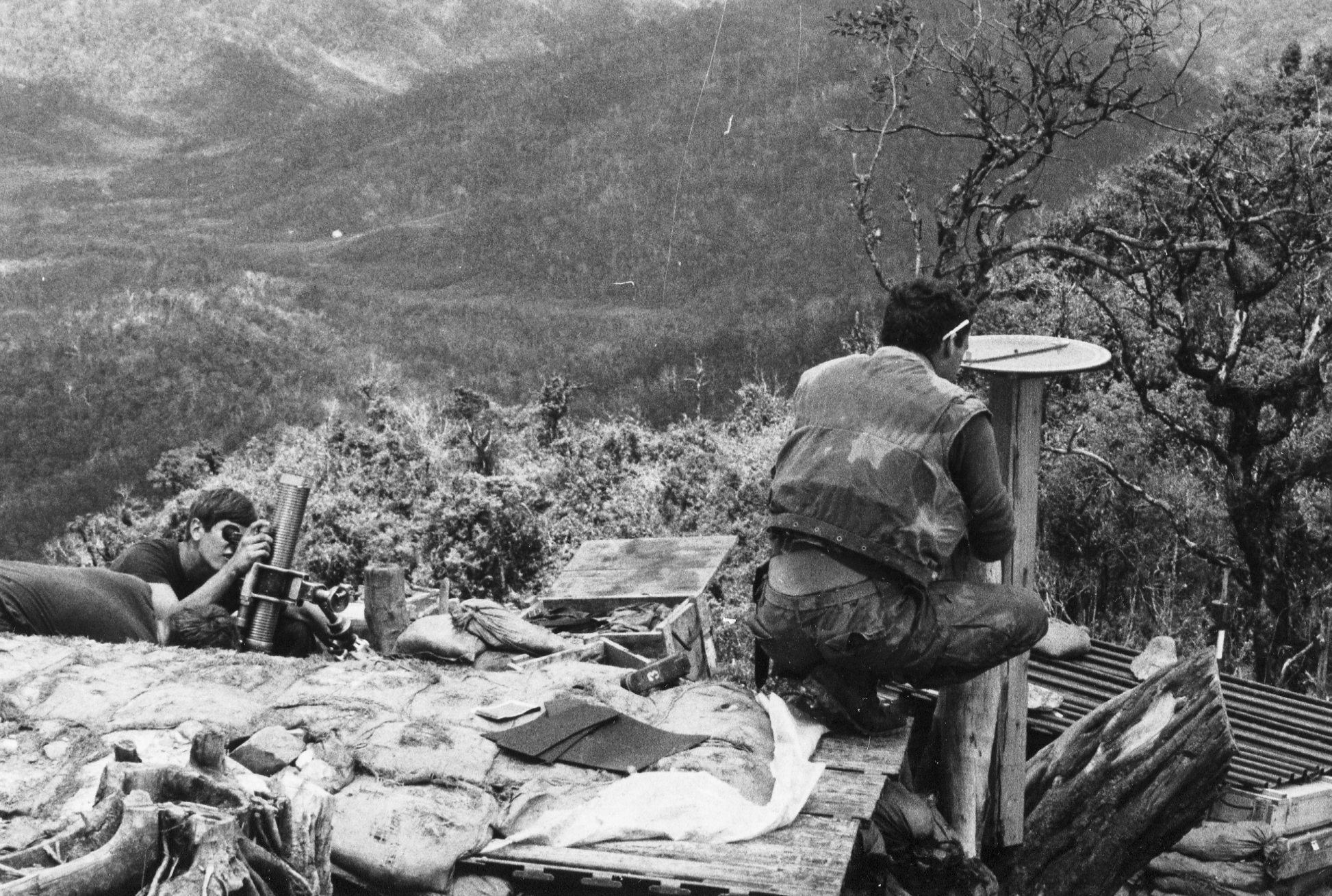
- Marines aim an 81mm mortar at Firebase Neville

Site information
- Type: Marines
- Condition: abandoned

Location
- Coordinates: 16.77°N 106.712°E

Site history
- Built: 1968
- In use: 1968-9
- Battles/wars: Vietnam War

Garrison information
- Occupants: 3rd Marine Division

Firebase Neville (also known as FSB Neville and LZ Neville) is a former U.S. Marine Corps fire support base north of Khe Sanh in Quảng Trị Province, Vietnam.

== History ==
The base was originally established in December 1968 by the 1st Battalion 4th Marines on Hill 1103 approximately 15 km north of Khe Sanh and just south of the DMZ.

In the early morning of 25 February 1969 200 People's Army of Vietnam (PAVN) sappers from the 246th Regiment attacked FSB Neville killing 12 Marines from the 2nd Battalion 4th Marines and 3rd Battalion 12th Marines and 2 Navy corpsmen. On the same morning the PAVN also attacked Firebase Russell 10km east of FSB Neville killing 29 Marines and Corpsmen.

== Current use ==
The base is abandoned and has reverted to jungle.
