= Firebase Russell =

Former US Marine Corps support base in Vietnam

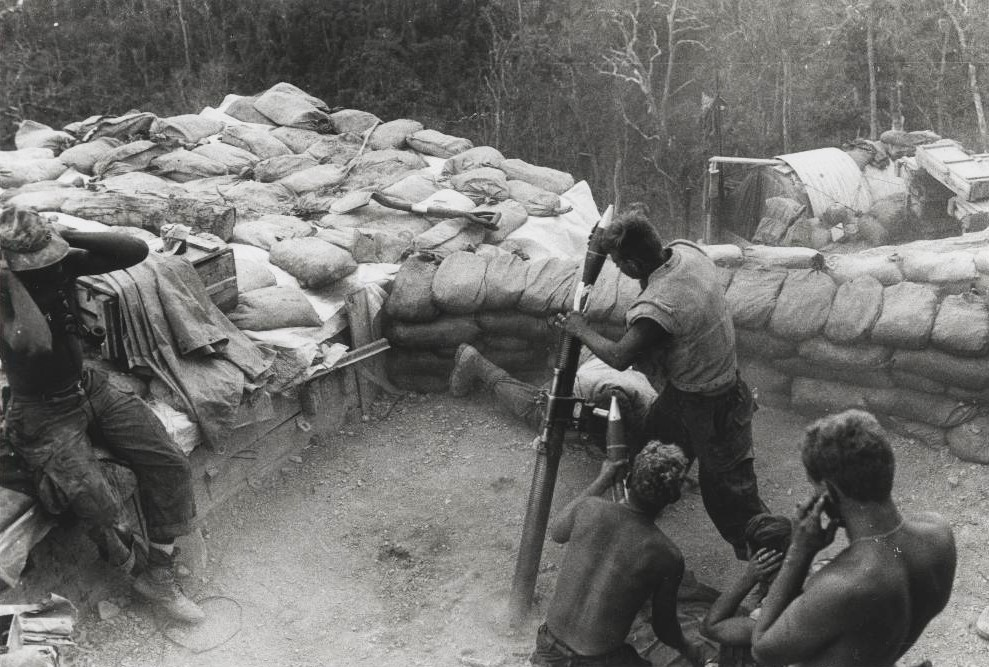
- 2nd Battalion, 4th Marines fire an 81mm mortar in support of Army of the Republic of Vietnam troops

Site information
- Type: Marines
- Condition: abandoned

Location
- Coordinates: 16°48′07″N 106°48′45″E

Site history
- Built: 1968
- In use: 1968-9
- Battles/wars: Vietnam War

Garrison information
- Occupants: 3rd Marine Division

Firebase Russell (also known as FSB Russell and LZ Russell) was a former U.S. Marine Corps fire support base northwest of The Rockpile in Quảng Trị Province, Vietnam.

== History ==
The base was originally established in December 1968 by the 1st Battalion 4th Marines approximately 3 km northwest of The Rockpile and just south of the DMZ.

On the morning of 25 February 1969 People's Army of Vietnam (PAVN) sappers from the 27th Regiment attacked FSB Russell killing 27 Marines from the 2nd Battalion, 4th Marines and 3rd Battalion, 12th Marines and 2 Navy corpsmen. On the same morning the PAVN also attacked Firebase Neville 10 km west of FSB Russell killing 14 Marines and Corpsmen.

On 21 September 1969 as Company L, 3rd Battalion, 4th Marines was dismantling the firebase, an accidental fire spread to a store of artillery rounds forcing the immediate evacuation of the base. On 22 September Company I, 3/4 Marines was landed at Russell to complete the destruction of the base which was done by exploding all remaining bunkers and munitions.

== Current use ==
The base is abandoned and has reverted to jungle.
