= Nông Sơn district =

Coordinates: 15°39′21″N 107°58′37″E

Nông Sơn district Huyện Nông Sơn
- District
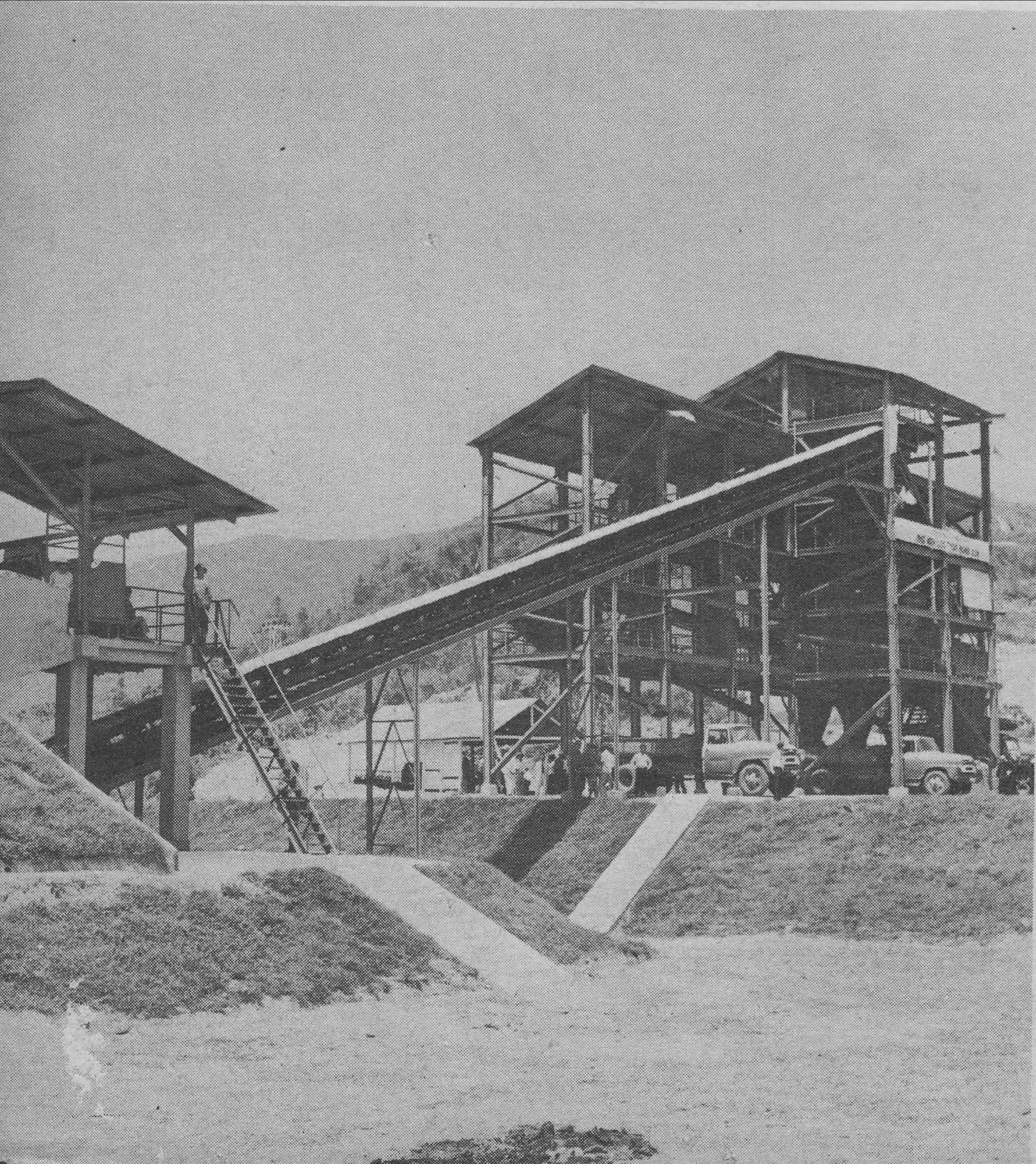
- Construction of a coal mine in the area
- Interactive map of Nông Sơn district
- Country: Vietnam
- Region: South Central Coast
- Province: Quảng Nam
- Capital: None

Area
  - Total: 176.03 sq mi (455.92 km^{2})

Population (2008)
  - Total: 40,360
- Time zone: UTC+7 (Indochina Time)

Nông Sơn is a new rural district of Quảng Nam province in the South Central Coast region of Vietnam. It was established in 2008 when part of Quế Sơn district split to form Nông Sơn District. The district capital is under construction.

== Communes ==
Nông Sơn district is subdivided into 7 communes: Quế Lộc, Quế Trung, Quế Ninh, Quế Phước, Quế Lâm, Sơn Viên and Phước Ninh.
