= Diên Sanh =

Diên Sanh Xã Diên Sanh
- Commune
- Diên Sanh commune
- Location within Vietnam
- Coordinates: 16°41′38″N 107°14′59″E
- Country: Vietnam
- Region: North Central Coast
- Province: Quảng Trị
- Time zone: UTC+7 (UTC + 7)

Diên Sanh is a commune (xã) of Quảng Trị Province, Vietnam.
