= Operation Montana Mauler =

Part of the Vietnam War (1969)

- Part of the Vietnam War
Date	23 March – 3 April 1969
Location	Khe Chua Valley, Quảng Trị Province, South Vietnam 16.827°N 106.890°E
Result	US claims operational success

Belligerents
United States	North Vietnam

Commanders and leaders
James M. Gibson	Unknown

Units involved
3rd Squadron, 5th Armored Cavalry; 1st Battalion, 11th Infantry Regiment; 3rd Battalion, 9th Marines	27th Regiment

Casualties and losses
38 killed	US body count: 271 killed

Operation Montana Mauler was a United States Army and US Marine Corps operation that took place north of Firebase Fuller, Quảng Trị Province, lasting from 23 March to 3 April 1969.

== Background ==
In mid-March U.S. intelligence learnt that the People's Army of Vietnam (PAVN) 27th Regiment was moving south of the DMZ in an attempt to cut Route 9. A counter-infiltration operation was planned whereby the 3rd Squadron, 5th Armored Cavalry and the 1st Battalion, 11th Infantry Regiment would patrol the Khe Chua Valley north of Firebase Fuller.

== Operation ==
The operation commenced on 23 March with the 3/5 Cavalry moving into the Khe Chua Valley meeting limited opposition. On the morning of 24 March the cavalry encountered an estimated battalion-size PAVN force in entrenched positions and pulled back to allow for artillery support; the cavalry called for reinforcements, and Company I, 3rd Battalion, 9th Marines was lifted by helicopter to the scene of the engagement. The following day the cavalry and marines continued patrolling westward into the valley, while Companies A and B, 1/11th Infantry, were deployed by helicopter in the north of the valley. At 03:00 the PAVN attacked the 1/11th Infantry night defensive positions, causing limited damage; at dawn the 1/11th Infantry assaulted in the direction of the PAVN attack, returning to their previous defensive positions at nightfall.

On 27 March the 1/11th Infantry resumed their attack supported by 3/9 Marines, the 1/11th Infantry engaged PAVN in bunkers and fell back to allow for artillery support and Company C, 1/11 Infantry was deployed by helicopter to form a blocking position. The 1/11th Infantry resumed their attack but were hit by PAVN mortar fire and counter-attacks and so withdrew to allow for further artillery and airstrikes before taking the PAVN positions. Total losses for the day were 120 PAVN killed for the loss of 13 U.S. killed, including all of Company B's officers.

On 29 March Company D, 1/11th Infantry overran a PAVN bunker complex, killing 5 PAVN. As Company A advanced west of Company D, it came under attack from an estimated company-size PAVN unit, the day-long battle that followed resulted in 30 PAVN killed.

The cavalry, infantry and marines continued patrolling the Khe Chua Valley for a further 4 days, meeting little resistance.

== Aftermath ==
Operation Montana Mauler concluded on 3 April, with the US claiming the PAVN 27th Regiment had lost approximately 300 killed.
