= 61st Infantry Regiment (United States) =

- Coat of arms
- Active: 1917-1921; 1927-1944; 1950-present
- Country: United States
- Branch: United States Army
- Type: Basic training
- Motto: "The Best Lead the Rest"
- Engagements: World War I Vietnam War; Invasion of Panama

Insignia
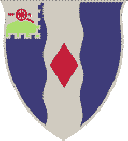
- Distinctive unit insignia

The 61st Infantry Regiment is an infantry regiment of the United States Army traditionally associated with the 5th Infantry Division.

== History ==
=== World War I ===
The 61st Infantry Regiment was organized in June 1917 around a cadre from the 7th Infantry Regiment and assigned to the 5th Division.

=== Interwar period ===
After serving in France, the 61st Infantry arrived at the port of New York on 20 July 1919 on the troopship RMS Aquitania and was transferred on 28 July 1919 to Camp Gordon, Georgia. The regiment was transferred on 13 October 1920 to Camp Jackson, South Carolina, and was inactivated on 2 September 1921 and allotted to the Fifth Corps Area for mobilization responsibility; the 11th Infantry Regiment was previously designated as "Active Associate" on 27 July 1921, from which the personnel would come to reactivate the regiment in the event of war. The personnel of the 61st Infantry were concurrently transferred to the 11th Infantry. The 11th Infantry was relieved as Active Associate on 28 February 1927 with the discontinuation of the program.

The 61st Infantry, less the 3rd Battalion, was subsequently affiliated with the University of Kentucky Reserve Officers Training Corps (ROTC) program and organized about June 1927 as a "Regular Army Inactive" (RAI) unit at Lexington, Kentucky, with Regular Army personnel assigned to the ROTC detachment and Reserve officers commissioned from the program. Concurrently, the 3rd Battalion was organized at Louisville, Kentucky. The 61st Infantry was relieved from the 5th Division on 15 August 1927 and assigned to the 8th Division, and reassigned to the 5th Division on 1 October 1933. The regiment conducted a mobilization test from 13–26 October 1935 at Lexington. On 16 October 1939, the 61st Infantry was relieved from the 5th Division when the division converted from a square division to a triangular division. The regiment usually conducted summer training at Fort Knox, Kentucky, and some years at Fort Benjamin Harrison, Indiana, or Fort Thomas, Kentucky. As an alternate form of summer training, it also conducted infantry Citizens Military Training Camps some years at Fort Benjamin Harrison.

=== World War II ===
The 61st Infantry Regiment was disbanded on 11 November 1944.

=== Cold War ===
The 61st Infantry Regiment was reconstituted and assigned to the 8th Infantry Division on 10 August 1950 and activated on 17 August at Fort Jackson, South Carolina. The regiment's campaign honors include the Vietnam War. Where it took part in Operation Montana Mauler on the Khe Sanh plateau in 1969, and the United States invasion of Panama in 1989.

=== Present ===
The 1st Battalion, 61st Infantry Regiment, is nicknamed the "Roadrunners." There are five companies, Alpha ("Gator"), Bravo ("Bulldogs"), Charlie ("Cobras"), Delta ("Dragons"), and Echo ("War Eagles"), with four platoons in each company. The 61st is a gender-integrated pre-BCT unit and currently the Army's only Future Soldier Preparatory Course battalion.

== Distinctive unit insignia ==
- Description

A silver color metal and enamel device 1 3/32 inches (2.78 cm) in height overall consisting of a shield blazoned: Azure, a pale wavy Argent charged with a fusil Gules, on a canton embattled of the second a field gun of the third on a mount Vert.

- Symbolism

This regiment was organized in June 1917 from the 7th Infantry and participated in World War I in the 5th Division, the insignia of which is carried on the shield. The wavy pale represents the Meuse River, the crossing of which near Dun in November 1918 was the outstanding operation of the regiment.

- Background

The distinctive unit insignia was approved on 10 Jun 1931.

== Coat of arms ==
Blazon

- Shield- Azure, a pale wavy Argent charged with a fusil Gules. On a canton embattled of the second a field gun of the third on a mount Vert.
- Crest- On a wreath of the colors Argent and Azure a lion rampant Sable armed and langued Gules grasping in his dexter paw the shoulder sleeve insignia of the 5th Division Proper.
- Motto- THE BEST LEAD THE REST

Symbolism- This regiment was organized in June 1917 from the 7th Infantry and participated in World War I in the 5th Division, the insignia of which is carried on the shield and also the crest. The wavy pale represents the Meuse River, the crossing of which near Dun in November 1918 was the outstanding operation of the regiment. The lion of the crest is taken from the arms of Montmédy, the nearest place to Dun having a coat of arms.

Background- The coat of arms was originally approved on 9 Jun 1920. It was amended on 16 Jul 1920 to change the wording in the blazon of the shield. On 25 Oct 1965 the coat of arms was amended to add a motto.
