= Hải Lăng district =

Coordinates: 16.667°N 107.250°E

Hải Lăng District Huyện Hải Lăng
- District
- Interactive map of Hải Lăng District
- Country: Vietnam
- Region: North Central Coast
- Province: Quảng Trị
- Capital: Diên Sanh

Area
  - Total: 190 sq mi (491 km^{2})

Population (2003)
  - Total: 100,854
- Time zone: UTC+07:00 (ICT)

Hải Lăng is a former rural district of Quảng Trị province in the North Central Coast region of Vietnam. As of 2003 the district had a population of 100,854. The district covers an area of 291 km^{2} (112 sq mi). The district capital lies at Diên Sanh.
