= 1969 in the Vietnam War =

← 1968 1970 →
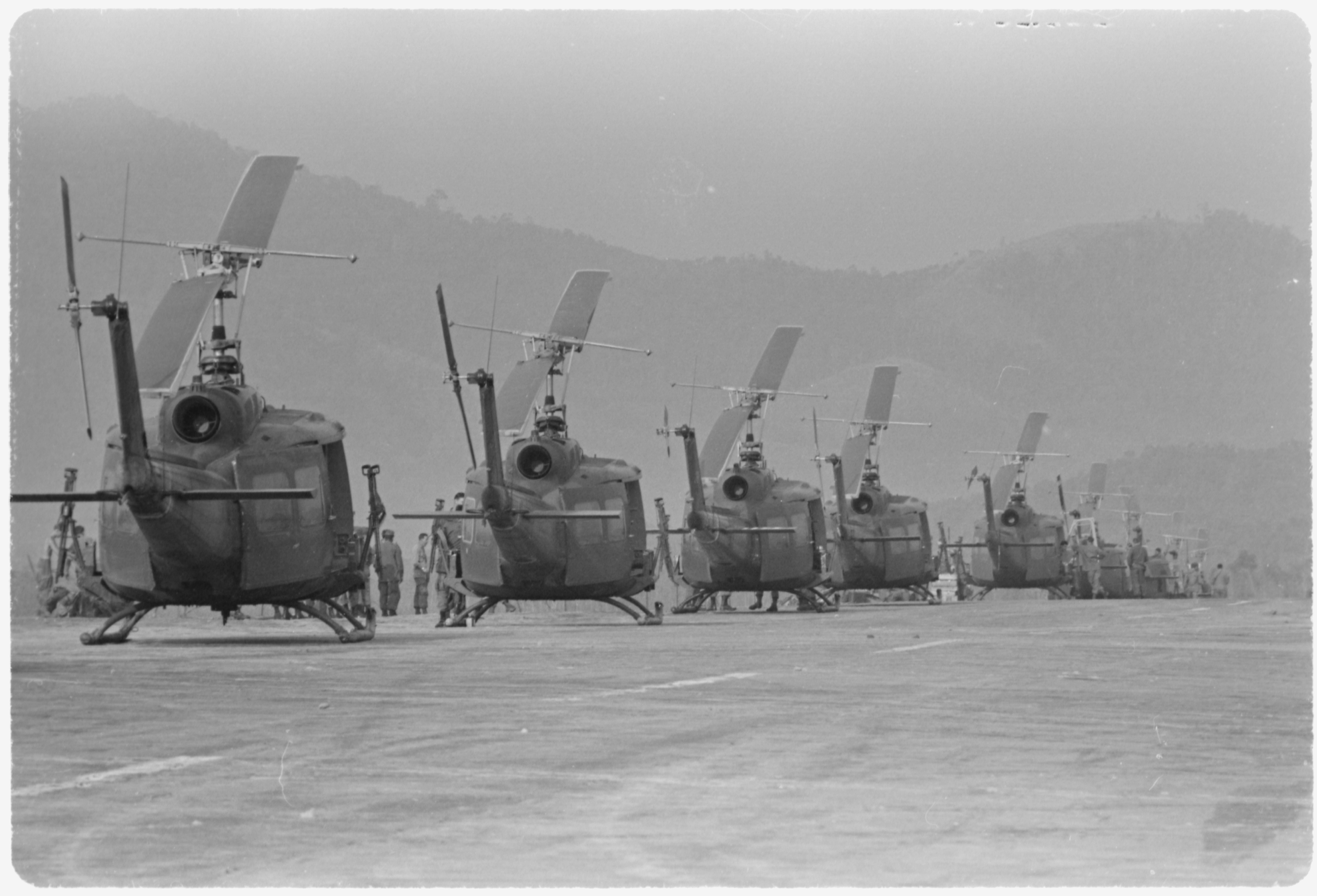
- Helicopters of the 170th and the 189th Helicopter Assault Companies await the loading of troops at Polei Kleng, in the Central Highlands of South Vietnam
| Location | Indochina |

Belligerents
| Anti-Communist forces: South Vietnam; United States; South Korea; Australia; Philippines; New Zealand; Thailand; Kingdom of Laos (Taiwan) Republic of China | Communist forces: North Vietnam (Provisional Revolutionary Government of the Republic of South Vietnam) Viet Cong (Cambodia) Khmer Rouge (Laos) Pathet Lao; People's Republic of China; Soviet Union; North Korea |

Strength
| South Vietnam 897,000; United States: 549,500; South Korea: 48,870; Thailand : 11,570; Australia: 7,670; Philippines: 190 New Zealand: 550 | |

Casualties and losses
| US: 11,780 killed South Vietnam: 21,833 killed | |

The inauguration of Richard Nixon in January led to a reevaluation of the U.S. role in the war. U.S. forces peaked at 543,000 in April. U.S. military strategy remained relatively unchanged from the offensive strategy of 1968 until the Battle of Hamburger Hill in May which led to a change a more reactive approach. The U.S. and South Vietnam agreed on a policy of Vietnamization with South Vietnamese forces being expanded and equipped to take over more of the ground combat from the departing Americans which began to withdraw in late June without any reciprocal commitment by the North Vietnamese. The morale of U.S. ground forces began to fray with increasing racial tensions and the first instances of fragging and combat refusal. The antiwar movement in the U.S. continued to grow and public opinion turned increasingly antiwar when the Mỹ Lai massacre was revealed in November.

== January ==
1 January to 31 August

Operation Rice Farmer was a U.S. 9th Infantry Division and Army of the Republic of Vietnam (ARVN) 5th Division operation in Dinh Tuong, Kien Tuong and Kien Hoa Provinces. The operation resulted in 1,860 PAVN/VC killed.

1 January to 31 December

Operation Quyet Thang II was an ARVN 7th Division, 9th Division and 21st Division clear and search operation in IV Corps. The operation resulted in 37,874 PAVN/VC killed.

3 January

A Vietcong (VC) bomb exploded in a messhall at Củ Chi Base Camp killing 15 Americans mostly from the 554th Engineer Battalion and two Vietnamese kitchen staff.

6 January

The South Vietnamese Minister of Education, Dr. Le Minh Tri, was killed when two VC on a motorcycle threw a hand grenade through the window of the car in which he was riding.

12 January to 7 February

In Operation Bold Mariner the 2nd Battalion, 26th Marines and 3rd Battalion, 26th Marines clear, search and depopulate the Batangan Peninsula a VC stronghold in Quảng Ngãi Province.

14 January

During Operation Toan Thang II a convoy of the 48th Transportation Group was ambushed in Tây Ninh Province, 122 PAVN/VC were killed and three individual and one crew-served weapons were captured; U.S. losses were seven killed.

18 January

The parties to the Paris Peace Talks came to an agreement on the shape of the conference tables and the placement of the representatives who were negotiating an end to the war. After being delayed for nearly six weeks over procedural disagreements raised by South Vietnamese Vice President Nguyễn Cao Kỳ, the parties came to an accord that "The two sides would be 'clearly separated' by two rectangular tables with a round one in the middle" and that the tables would have "no nameplates, no flags and no written minutes of the understanding" on the setup.

20 January

Richard Nixon is inaugurated as 37th President of the United States.

21 January

The White House issues National Security Study Memorandum 1 to the U.S. Ambassador in Saigon, the Joint Chiefs of Staff and Military Assistance Command Vietnam (MACV) "to develop an agreed evaluation of the situation in Vietnam as a basis for making policy decisions."

22 January to 18 March

The U.S. 3rd Marine Division launched Operation Dewey Canyon to attack People's Army of Vietnam (PAVN) base areas in the A Shau and Song Đa Krông Valleys of Quảng Trị Province. The operation results in 1,617 PAVN killed while 130 Marines were killed.

29-30 January

An ambush patrol of Company C, 1st Battalion, 7th Marines observed approximately 300 PAVN cross the Song Ky Lam River, 6 km west of Điện Bàn. The company called in artillery fire and then engaged the unit, with Company D, 5th Marines joining the action. A search of the area at dawn found 72 PAVN dead.

The first M551 Sheridan Armored Reconnaissance Vehicles arrived in South Vietnam and were deployed by the 3rd Squadron, 4th Cavalry Regiment and the 1st Squadron, 11th Armored Cavalry Regiment.

== February ==
4 February to 19 April

Operation Cheyenne Sabre was a 3rd Brigade, 1st Cavalry Division operation in Biên Hòa Province. The operation resulted in 600 PAVN/VC killed.

10 February

Kỳ announced that South Vietnam would negotiate a political settlement with the VC once the PAVN had withdrawn from South Vietnam.

14 February

A Gallup poll showed that 35% of Americans favor an immediate withdrawal from South Vietnam, up from 21%.

17 February to 31 October

U.S. Army and ARVN forces begin the multi-division Operation Toan Thang III to keep pressure on PAVN/VC forces in III Corps. The operation results in 41,803 PAVN/VC killed and 3,299 captured, U.S. losses were 1,533 killed.

19 February

A bicycle bomb exploded in a shop in Truc Giang, Kien Hoa Province, killing six civilians and wounding 16.

22 February

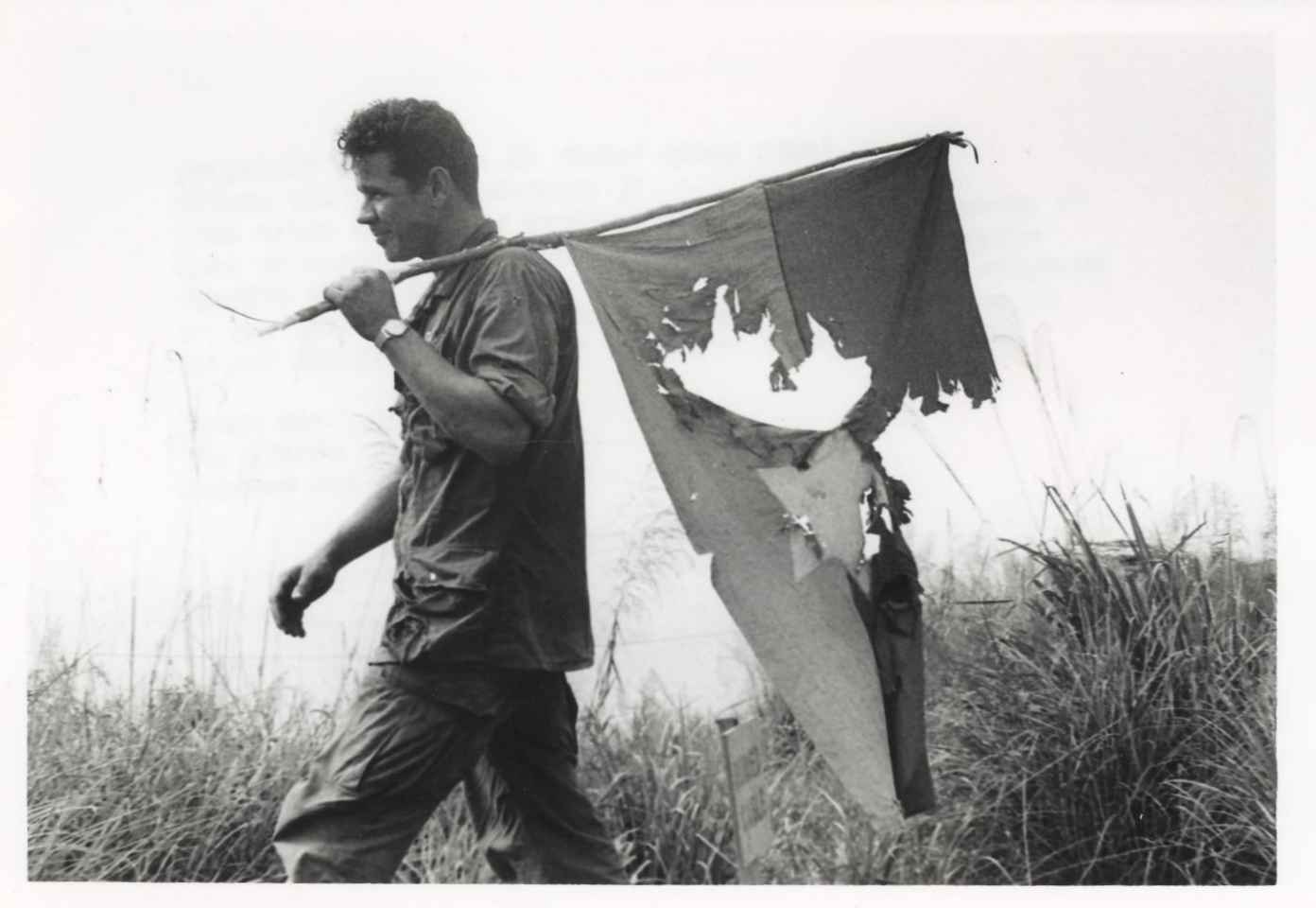
A Marine carries a shredded VC flag near Da Nang

The PAVN launched the Tet 1969 offensive against U.S. military targets near Saigon and Da Nang. The attacks were quickly beaten off. In the attack on Bien Hoa Air Base the PAVN lost 264 killed and 87 captured while ARVN losses were 10 killed and U.S. losses were one killed. Around Da Nang the PAVN/VC lost over 500 killed.

The PAVN attacked Tiên Phước Camp which was defended by the 5th Special Forces Detachment A-102 and Civilian Irregular Defense Group program (CIDG) forces. The base was secured the following morning for a loss of 1 U.S. and 54 CIDG killed.

23 February

A PAVN rocket attack on Da Nang Air Base destroyed a 450,000 gallon fuel tank beside the base and damaged a Marine A-6 Intruder.

PAVN sappers attacked Hill 327 and the positions of the 2nd Battalion 7th Marines northwest of the Hill, both attacks were beaten back with 18 Marines killed and 80 wounded while the PAVN lost 75 killed or captured.

A PAVN sapper attack on Dầu Tiếng Base Camp resulted in 21 U.S. and 73 PAVN killed.

The PAVN 271st and 272nd Regiments attacked Patrol Base Diamond I occupied by the U.S. 2nd Battalion, 27th Infantry Regiment. The attack was repulsed with artillery and gunship fire with an estimated 118 PAVN killed and two captured.

24 February - 10 March

The ARVN 2nd Division conducted Operation Quyet Thang 22 in Quảng Ngãi Province. The operation resulted in 777 PAVN/VC casualties.

25 February

The North Vietnamese Foreign Ministry on Radio Hanoi stated that the "South Vietnamese people" could attack U.S. forces "at any place on Vietnamese territory" and denied that there was any agreement not to conduct such attacks in return for the bombing halt.

26 February

A PAVN sapper attack on Củ Chi Base Camp destroyed nine Boeing CH-47 Chinook helicopters of the 242nd Assault Support Helicopter Company.

27 February

A PAVN rocket hit LCU-1500 while it was loading at the Bridge Ramp in Da Nang killing 13 crewmen.

In Paris the U.S. stated that the Tet 69 attacks, particularly against civilian targets, breached the understanding behind the bombing halt.

27 February - 20 June

Operation Quảng Nam was conducted by the ARVN 1st Ranger Group in Quảng Nam Province. The operation resulted in 688 PAVN/VC killed.

28 February - 2 March

In the Fourth Battle of Nakhang the PAVN 316th Division overran Royal Lao Army (RLA) forces at Lima Site 36 at Na Khang. The PAVN lost an estimated 250 killed and the RLA lost nine killed. The PAVN lost 26 killed while an entire RLA battalion was killed.

28 February to 8 May

The U.S. 101st Airborne Division and ARVN 1st Division launched Operation Massachusetts Striker to keep pressure on the PAVN in the southern A Shau Valley. The operation results in 223 PAVN killed and two captured while U.S. losses were 59 killed.

28 February to 28 February 1971

The 11th Light Infantry Brigade launched Operation Iron Mountain to attack PAVN/VC bases and logistics routes in southeastern Quảng Ngãi Province. The operation resulted in 4,589 PAVN/VC killed and 137 captured while U.S. losses are 440 killed.

== March ==
1 March to 14 April

Operation Wayne Grey was conducted by the 1st Brigade, 4th Infantry Division in the Plei Trap Valley, Kontum Province. The operation resulted in 575 PAVN killed and four captured, U.S. losses were 106 killed and one missing.

1 March to 8 May

The 4th Marine Regiment launched Operation Purple Martin against three PAVN regiments operating near the Vietnamese Demilitarized Zone (DMZ). The operation results in 347 PAVN killed and approximately 100 Marines killed.

1 March to 14 August

Operation Kentucky Jumper was a clear and search operation conducted by the 101st Airborne Division, 9th Infantry Division and ARVN 3rd Regiment, 1st Division in Thừa Thiên Province. The operation resulted in 317 PAVN/VC killed for the loss of 61 U.S. killed.

1 March to August 1971

In the DMZ Campaign (1969-71) the 1st Brigade, 5th Infantry Division (Mechanized) assumed responsibility for the defense of the DMZ from the 3rd Marine Division as it withdrew from South Vietnam.

2 March

Chinese People's Liberation Army troops attacked Soviet border guards on Zhenbao Island, marking a new low in relations between North Vietnam's principal allies.

Village and hamlet elections were held throughout South Vietnam, largely free of PAVN/VC interference.

2-4 March

Nixon met Lodge and Kỳ and Paris and subsequently stated that further attacks would not be tolerated.

3 March

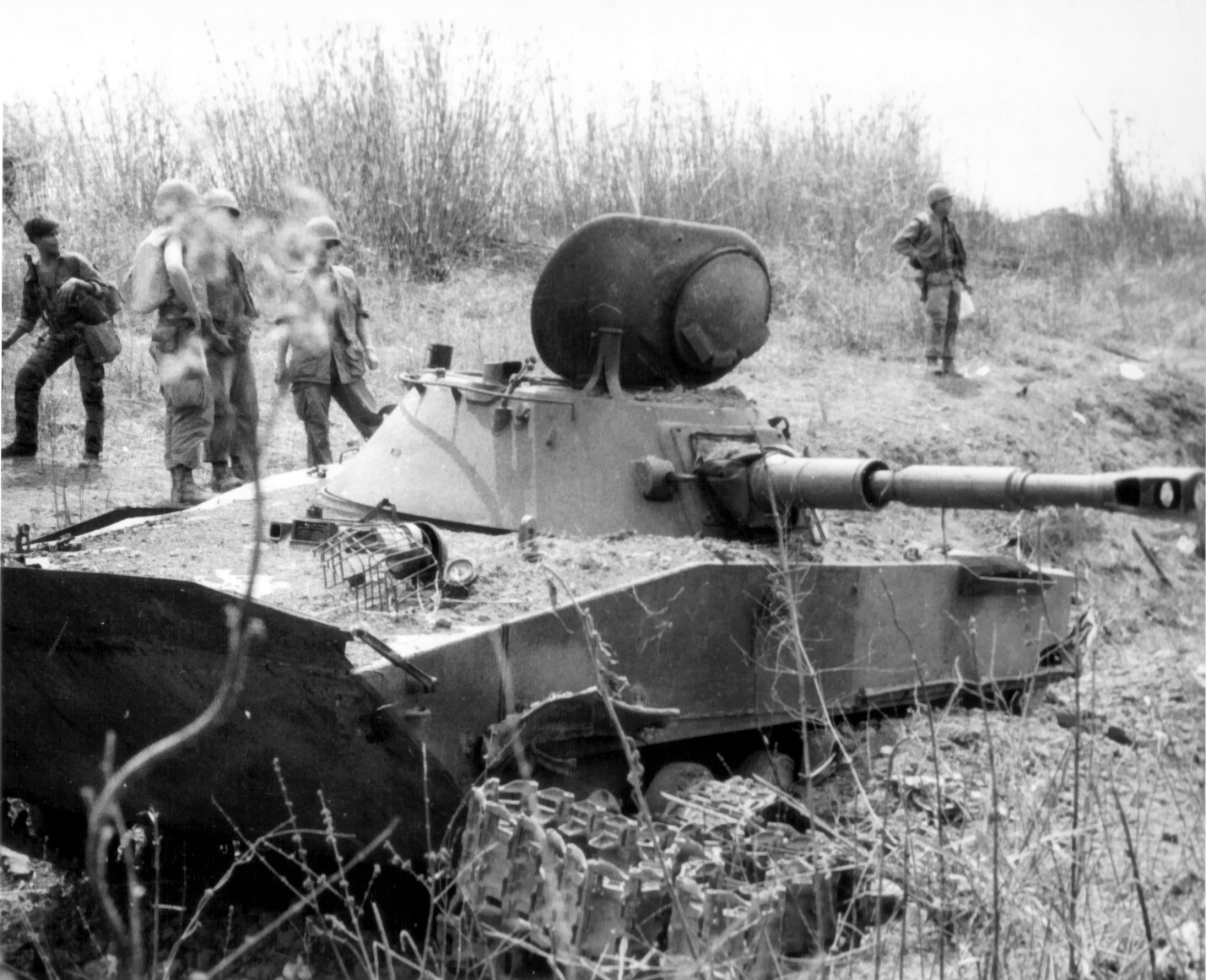
One of two PT-76s destroyed at Ben Het

Ben Het Camp was attacked by the PAVN 66th Regiment, supported by armored vehicles of the 4th Battalion, 202nd Armored Regiment. Two PT-76s and one BTR-50 were destroyed by U.S. M-48s of the 1st Battalion, 69th Armor Regiment in one of the few armored battles of the war.

3-4 March

Company A, 3rd Battalion, 8th Infantry lost 21 killed fighting a PAVN battalion at Landing Zone Brace in the Plei Trap Valley approximately 44 km west of Kontum.

4 March

The Rector of Saigon University, Professor Tran Anh, was shot by VC on a motorcycle; previously he had been notified that he was on the "death list" of the "Suicide Regiment of the Saigon Youth Guard."

5 March

South Vietnamese Prime Minister, Tran Van Huong, narrowly escaped assassination by a four man VC team as he was being driven to his home in Saigon. Huong's car was attacked by the VC who were wearing stolen Ranger uniforms, however Saigon police and ARVN troops opened fire and gave the driver time to accelerate and escape.

The PAVN/VC fired seven rockets into Saigon killing 22 civilians.

6-11 March

Secretary of Defense Melvin Laird and Chairman of the Joint Chiefs of Staff Earle Wheeler visited South Vietnam.

13 March

Kon Sitiu and Kon Bobanh, two Montagnard villages in Kon Tum Province, were raided by VC; 15 persons killed; 23 kidnapped, two of whom were later executed; three long-houses, a church and a school burned. A hamlet chief is beaten to death. Survivors said that the VC explained that: "We are teaching you not to cooperate with the government."

15 March to 2 May

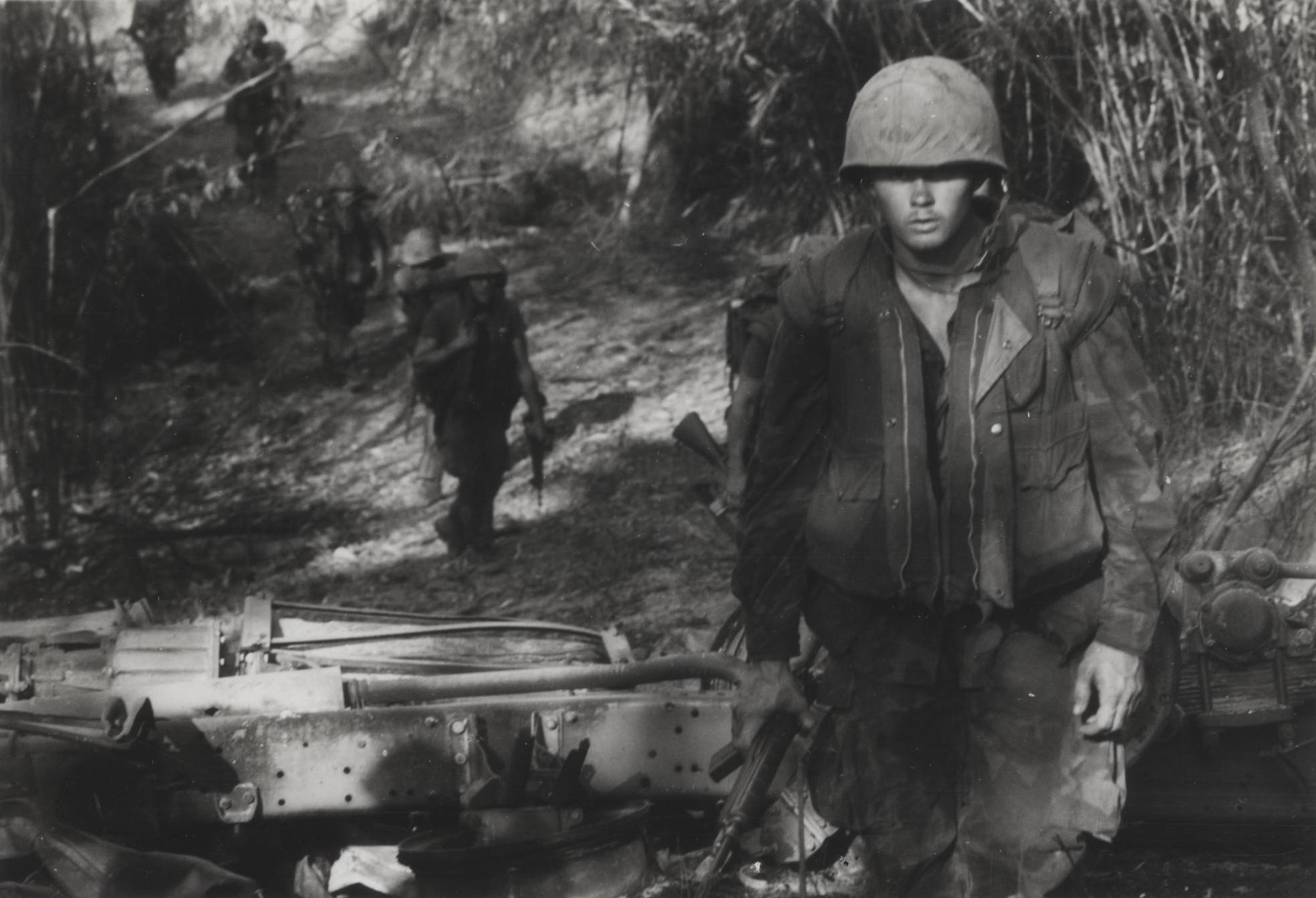
2/3 Marines pass a destroyed PAVN truck during Operation Maine Crag

The 3rd Marine Division and a regiment from the ARVN 1st Division launch Operation Maine Crag in the "Vietnam Salient" of Quảng Trị Province. The operation uncovered large amounts of supplies and resulted in 207 PAVN killed.

17 to 24 March

The 11th Armored Cavalry Regiment conducted Operation Atlas Wedge in the Michelin Rubber Plantation, resulting in 335 PAVN killed and 11 captured for the loss of seven U.S. killed.

17 March - 7 April

Operation Raindance was a USAF interdiction bombing campaign to support RLA forces fighting the PAVN/Pathet Lao on the Plain of Jars.

18 March to 28 May 1970

Operation Menu was the codename of a covert United States Air Force (USAF) Strategic Air Command (SAC) bombing campaign conducted in eastern Cambodia from 18 March 1969 until 26 May 1970. The supposed targets of these attacks were PAVN/VC sanctuaries and base areas used for resupply, training, and resting between campaigns across the border in the South Vietnam.

18 March to 28 February 1971

The 196th Light Infantry Brigade and ARVN 5th Regiment, 2nd Division launched Operation Frederick Hill to pacify the coastal areas of Quảng Tín Province. The operation results in 7,514 PAVN/VC killed and 133 captured, U.S. losses are 572 killed.

18 March to 28 February 1971

The 198th Light Infantry Brigade and ARVN 6th Regiment, 2nd Division launch Operation Geneva Park to pacify Quảng Ngãi Province. the operation results in 2,337 PAVN killed and 67 captured, U.S. losses are 231 killed.

20-31 March

Operation Quyet Thang 25 was conducted by the ARVN 4th Regiment, 2nd Division in Quảng Ngãi Province. The operation resulted in 592 PAVN/VC killed.

21 March

A Kon Tum Province refugee center was attacked for the second time by a PAVN battalion using mortars and B-40 rockets. Seventeen civilians were killed and 36 wounded, many of them women and children. A third of the center was destroyed.

22 March

A Gallup poll showed that 32% of Americans favor escalating the war, 19% favor continuing the current policy, 26% favor withdrawal and 21% had no opinion.

23 March to 3 April

The 3rd Battalion, 9th Marines and elements of the 1st Brigade, 5th Infantry Division launch Operation Montana Mauler against the PAVN 27th Regiment north of Firebase Fuller in Quảng Trị Province. The operation results in 271 PAVN killed, U.S. losses are 38 killed.

24 March

The VC attacked Tam Soc Base in Sóc Trăng Province killing two U.S. advisers from MACV Advisory team 71 and capturing another two, both of whom died in captivity.

25 March

John Lennon and Yoko Ono began their first Bed-In for Peace at the Hilton Amsterdam.

28 March

Mass graves of victims of the VC's Massacre at Huế were uncovered.

31 March to 29 May

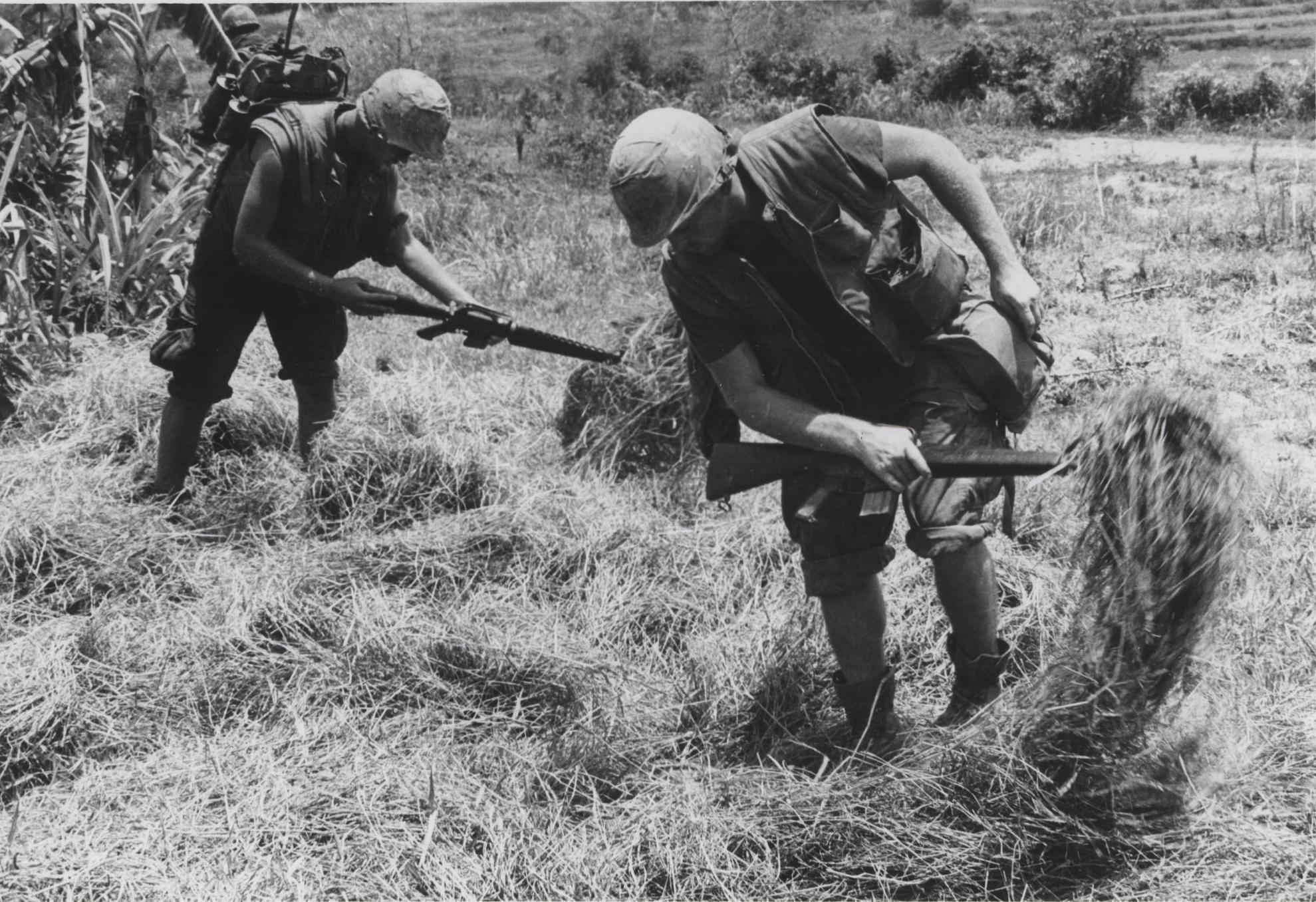
7th Marines search for supply caches during Operation Oklahoma Hills

The 1st Marine Division and ARVN 51st Regiment, 1st Division launched Operation Oklahoma Hills in southwest Quảng Nam Province. The operation resulted in 589 PAVN killed, U.S. losses were 43 killed.

== April ==
The number of American military personnel in Vietnam peaked at 543,000.

1 April

Laird announced that B-52 bombing missions over South Vietnam would be reduced by 10% due to reductions in the defense budget.

3 April

The U.S. Department of Defense announced that the death toll for American soldiers in the war had exceeded the 32,629 who had died in the Korean War, based on 312 additional deaths during the week from March 22 to March 28 to bring the toll to 33,641.

Laird announced that the U.S. sought to "Vietnamize" the war as quickly as possible but that troop withdrawals would not take place while the PAVN/VC was conducting attacks.

4 April

A pagoda in Quảng Nam Province was dynamited by the VC, killing four persons, wounding 14.

5 April

COSVN issued Directive 55 to all of its subordinate units, renouncing the strategy that had led to the Tet Offensive, saying: "Never again and under no circumstances are we going to risk our entire military force for just such an offensive. On the contrary, we should endeavor to preserve our military potential for future campaigns."

6-20 April

Operation Muskogee Meadows was a 5th Marine Regiment clear and search operation in Quảng Nam Province. The operation resulted in 162 PAVN/VC and 16 Marines killed.

7 April

South Vietnamese President Nguyễn Văn Thiệu announced that once PAVN forces were withdrawn from South Vietnam, former VC could participate in the political process but not as part of the VC or any other communist organization. This was rejected the next day by a VC spokesman in Paris.

9 April

VC attacked the Phu Binh refugee center, Quảng Ngãi Province and set fire to 70 houses, leaving 200 homeless. Four persons were kidnaped.

A Gallup poll found that 44% approved of Nixon's handling of the war, 26% disapproved and 30% gave no opinion.

10 April

National Security Study Memorandum 36 required an interagency plan with specific timetables for turning over the war to the South Vietnamese on the basis of four alternative timetables (18, 24, 30 and 42 months), with a starting date of 1 July 1969.

14 April

A PAVN/VC attack on Patrol Base Diamond III was repulsed with 198 PAVN/VC killed and eight captured and 40 individual and 42 crew-served weapons captured; U.S. losses were 13 killed.

15 April

A VC armed propaganda team invaded An Ky refugee center, Quảng Ngãi Province, and attempted to force out the people living there; nine were killed and ten others wounded.

15 April to 1 January 1971

The 173rd Airborne Brigade, ARVN 2nd Division and 22nd Division and Regional Force and Popular Forces launched Operation Washington Green a security and pacification operation in Bình Định Province. The operation results in 1,957 PAVN/VC killed, U.S. losses are 227 killed.

16 April

The Hoa Dai refugee center in Bình Định Province was invaded by a VC armed propaganda team. The refugees were urged to return to their former (VC dominated) village, but refused; the VC burned 146 houses.

After receiving a letter from Nixon affirming U.S. respect for the territory and sovereignty of Cambodia, Prince Norodom Sihanouk announced that he was ready to resume diplomatic relations with the U.S.

18 April

Nixon announced that prospects for peace had improved due to the political stability in Saigon and increased capabilities of the South Vietnamese forces.

18 April to 31 December

Operation Dan Thang 69 was conducted by the ARVN 22nd Division in Bình Định Province. The operation resulted in 507 PAVN/VC killed.

Operation Dan Tien 33D was conducted by the ARVN 23rd Division in Quang Duc Province. The operation resulted in 746 PAVN/VC killed.

19 April

Hieu Duc district refugee center, Quảng Nam Province, was invaded and ten persons kidnapped.

20 April

Nixon announced that he would order the withdrawal of 150,000 U.S. troops from South Vietnam over the next 12 months in a gradual policy of Vietnamization, putting more responsibility on the South Vietnamese.

21 April

In one of the first Fragging incidents of the war, a grenade was thrown into the office of K Company, 9th Marine Regiment, at Quảng Trị Combat Base, killing First Lieutenant Robert T. Rohweller. Private Reginald F. Smith pleaded guilty to the premeditated murder and was sentenced to 40 years' imprisonment; he died in custody on 25 June 1982.

22 April to 20 June

Operation Lam Son 277 was conducted by the ARVN 2nd Regiment, 1st Division in Quảng Trị Province. The operation resulted in 541 PAVN killed.

22 April to 22 September

Operation Putnam Tiger was conducted by the U.S. 4th Infantry Division in western Kon Tum and Pleiku Provinces. The operation resulted in 563 PAVN killed.

23 April

Son Tinh district refugee center, Quảng Ngãi Province, was invaded; two women were shot and 10 persons kidnapped.

25 April

Elements of the PAVN 271st Regiment attacked Patrol Base Frontier City southeast of Tây Ninh. The attack was countered with intensive fire from fixed wing and helicopter gunships and the PAVN lost 214 killed and six captured for no U.S. losses.

26 April

A firebase occupied by a unit of the 1st Brigade, 25th Infantry Division 20 km south of Tây Ninh was hit by 300 rounds of 82mm mortar and 107mm rocket fire and then attacked by an estimated two PAVN/VC battalions. The base was supported by artillery and helicopter and fixed wing gunships and 213 PAVN/VC were killed, six captured and 35 individual and 15 crew-served weapons captured.

27 April

An estimated battalion of PAVN assaulted a night defensive position of a unit of the 2nd Brigade, 25th Infantry Division 10 km northeast of Trảng Bàng. The attack was repulsed with 100 PAVN/VC killed and one captured and 32 individual and 23 crew-served weapons captured; U.S. losses were ten killed.

A grass fire spread to the Marines/Navy ammunition supply point 1 near Hill 327 causing a massive explosion and fire.

== May ==
2 May to 16 July

The 3rd Marine Regiment launches Operation Virginia Ridge to engage the PAVN 27th and 36th Regiments near the central DMZ. The operation results in 560 PAVN killed and 17 captured, Marine losses were 16 killed.

5-20 May

Operation Daring Rebel was conducted by the ARVN 2nd Division, ROK 2nd Marine Brigade and U.S. forces to seek out and destroy VC rest camps on Barrier Island south of Hội An. The operation resulted in 105 VC and two U.S. killed.

6 May

At 00:35 the 2nd Battalion, 8th Cavalry Regiment and 2nd Battalion, 19th Artillery Regiment in a night defensive position at Firebase Carolyn (11.547°N 106.167°E) 7 miles (11 km) south of Katum was attacked. The contact continued until 06:00 when the PAVN withdrew leaving 101 dead and 29 captured and 47 individual and 23 crew-served weapons captured; U.S. losses were nine killed.

A CH-47 carrying 83 persons crashed 3 miles (4.8 km) southwest of Phước Vĩnh Base Camp, killing 40 of those on board.

8 May

VC sappers detonated a charge outside the Saigon Central Post Office, killing an ARVN Captain and three civilians and wounding 19 civilians.

8 May to 2 July

The PAVN began bombarding Ben Het Camp and by early June it was besieged by PAVN forces. The base received extensive air and artillery support On 26 June 180 ARVN soldiers were airlifted into the camp and by 28 June the ARVN were conducting sweeps outside the camp perimeter to push back the PAVN. PAVN losses were estimated to be in excess of 1,000 killed, while Allied losses were approximately 300 killed, including approximately 30 U.S.

9 May

The New York Times carried a front page story titled "Raids in Cambodia By U.S. Unprotested" which was the first report of the secret Operation Menu bombing of Cambodia. The story would lead the Nixon Administration to try to uncover sources within the government who contributed to the article, leading to the wiretapping of journalists and eventually to the Watergate scandal.

10 May

Sappers exploded a charge of plastique in Duong Hong, Quảng Nam Province, killing eight civilians and wounding four.

10 May to 7 June

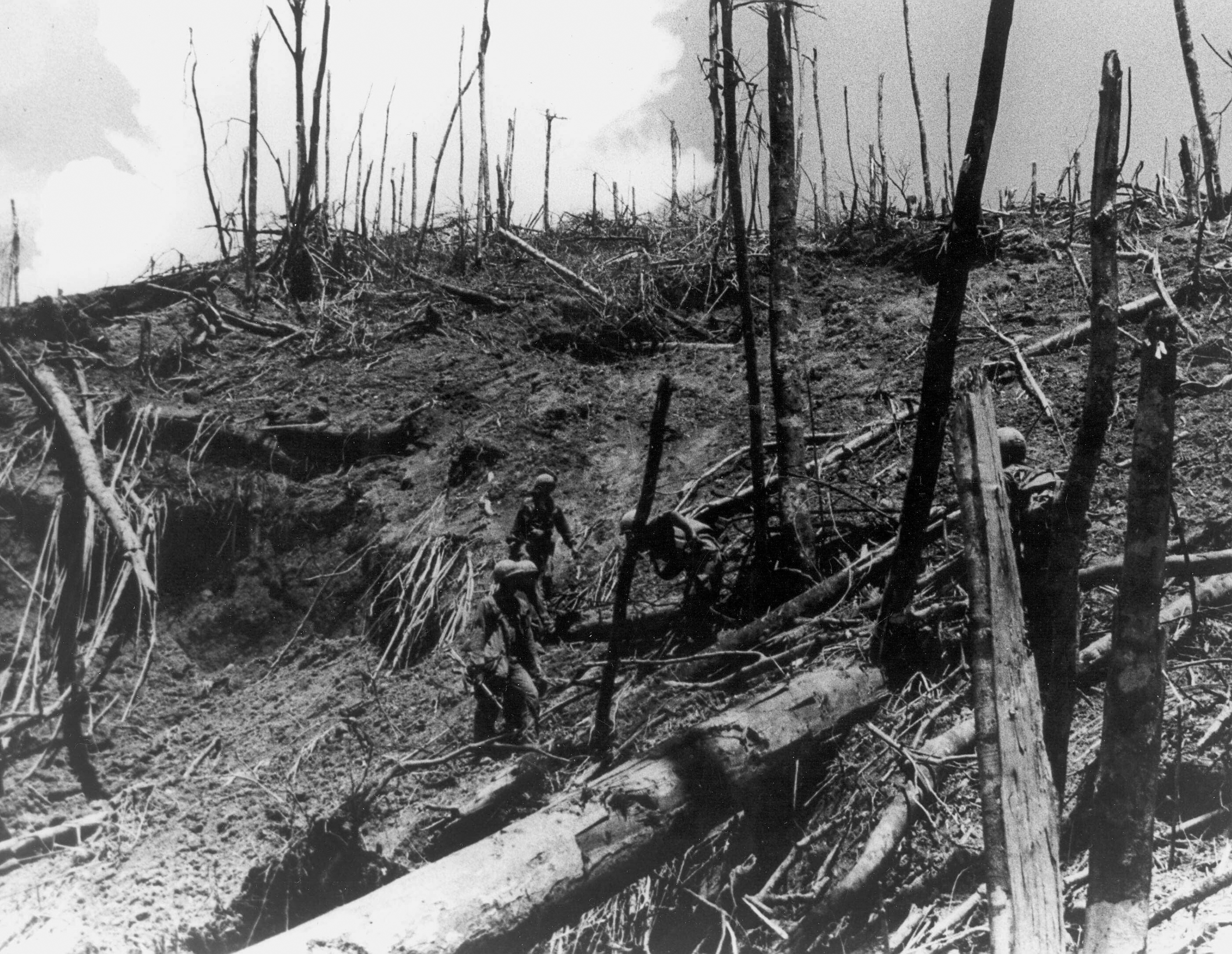
101st Airborne soldiers search near Hamburger Hill

The U.S. 101st Airborne Division and ARVN 1st Division launch Operation Apache Snow in the A Shau Valley. The operation results in 977 PAVN killed and five captured while U.S. losses were 113 killed and ARVN losses were 31 killed. Most of the U.S. casualties were in the Battle of Hamburger Hill from May 13–20 where U.S. forces attacked heavily fortified PAVN positions on Hill 937. 630 PAVN, 72 U.S. and 31 ARVN were killed in the fighting for Hill 937.

11 May

An estimated 600 PAVN troops attacked Landing Zone Oasis resulting in 11 U.S. killed and three captured and over 100 PAVN killed.

11-12 May

The PAVN/VC attacked 159 cities, town and military bases by fire. In Saigon 14 civilians were killed and over 100 wounded.

12 May

A VC sapper squad attacked Phu My, Bình Định Province, with satchel charges, rockets and grenades; 10 civilians were killed, 19 wounded; 87 homes were destroyed.

12-15 May

The PAVN V-16 Sapper Battalion attacked Landing Zone Professional occupied by elements of the 1st Battalion, 46th Infantry Regiment and 1st Battalion, 14th Artillery. The attack was repulsed but the PAVN continued to mortar the base and set up heavy machine guns to prevent helicopter resupply, shooting down a CH-47B on 15 May.

13 May

The PAVN 6th Regiment and K-12 Sapper Battalion attacked the 2nd Battalion, 501st Infantry Regiment, 2nd Battalion, 11th Artillery and 2nd Battalion, 319th Artillery on Firebase Airborne killing 22 U.S. for the loss of 40 PAVN killed.

Units of the PAVN 7th Infantry Division attacked Firebase Gela, the assault was repulsed for the loss of three U.S. and an estimated 39 PAVN soldiers killed.

14 May

Five PAVN 122mm rockets hit the residential area of Da Nang, killing five civilians and wounding 18.

15 May to 7 June

Operation Dan Quyen 38-A was conducted by the ARVN 42nd Regiment, 22nd Division and 22nd Ranger Group in Ben Het–Đắk Tô. The operation resulted in 945 PAVN killed.

15 May to 14 August

The 1st Brigade, 101st Airborne Division conducted Operation Lamar Plain in Quảng Tín Province. The operation resulted in 524 PAVN/VC killed and 21 captured and U.S. losses were 116 killed and one missing.

18 May

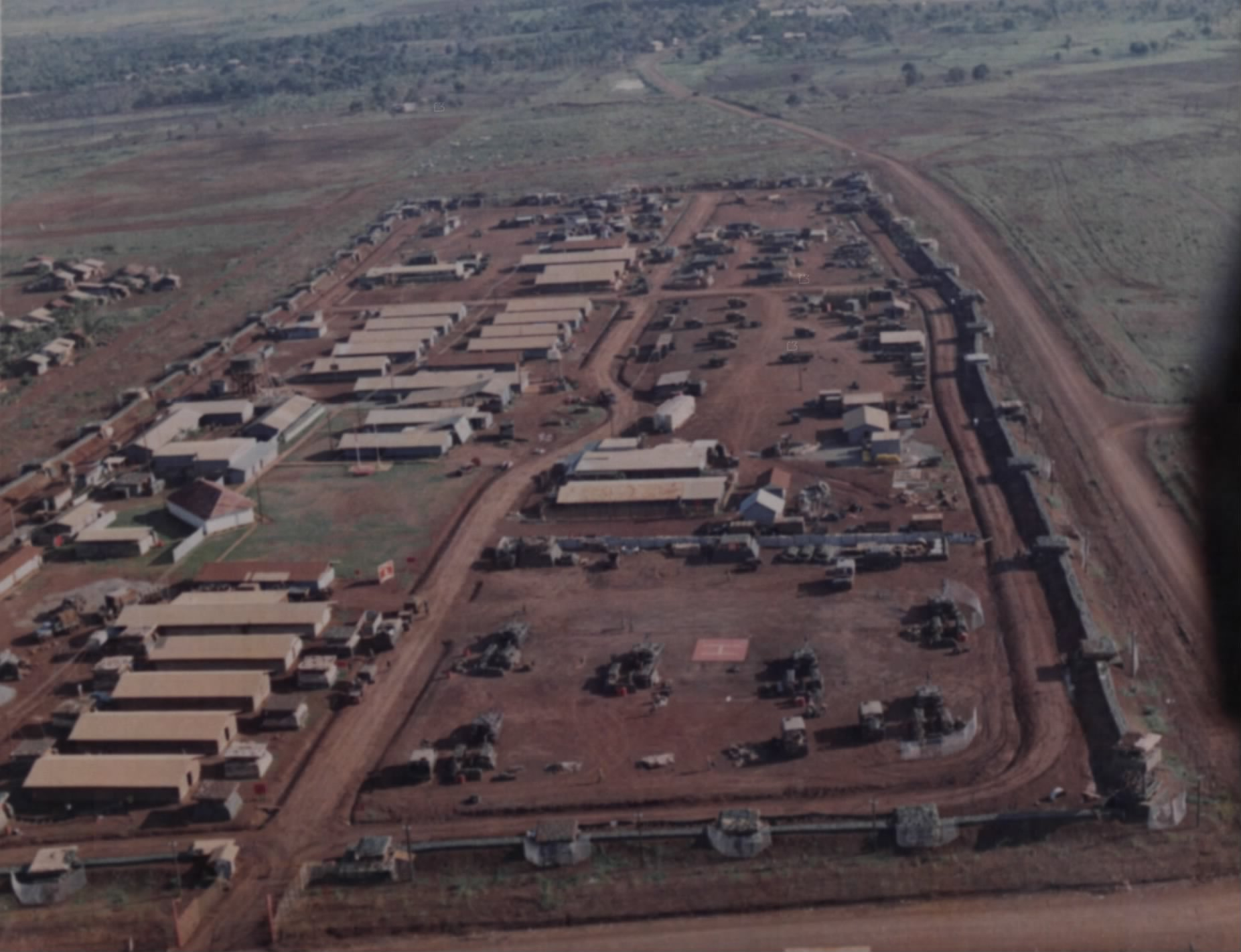
Xuân Lộc Base Camp

Elements of the VC 5th Division attacked Xuân Lộc Base Camp which was defended by the 7th Battalion, 9th Artillery Regiment and the 2nd Battalion, 35th Artillery Regiment, 54th Artillery Group. The VC penetrated the perimeter but were eventually driven out airstrikes and a unit of the 11th Armored Cavalry Regiment. The attack resulted in 24 VC and 14 U.S. killed.

26 May to 7 November

The 1st Marine Division, ARVN 51st Regiment and Republic of Korea Marine Corps 2nd Marine Brigade launch Operation Pipestone Canyon to pacify and clear Go Noi Island, Quảng Nam Province. The operation results in 852 PAVN/VC killed and 58 captured, U.S. Marine losses were 71 killed.

30 May

In a press conference at the end of a four day visit to South Korea, Thiệu declares that he will never accept a coalition government with the VC.

30 May to 1 July

Operation Lavarack was a reconnaissance in force conducted by the 6th Battalion, Royal Australian Regiment/Royal New Zealand Infantry Regiment (ANZAC) north of Nui Dat. The operation resulted in 102 PAVN/VC and 3 ANZACs killed.

== June ==
1 June

During their second Bed-in for Peace at the Queen Elizabeth Hotel, Montreal, John Lennon, Yoko Ono and friends record Give Peace a Chance which is released as a single in July 1969.

3 June

74 U.S. Navy crewmen aboard the USS Frank E. Evans died in a collision with the Royal Australian Navy light aircraft carrier HMAS Melbourne during an exercise in the South China Sea.

5 June

U.S. aircraft bomb North Vietnam for the first time since the bombing halt in retaliation for the shootdown of a U.S. reconnaissance plane.

6-8 June

Aftermath of the Battle of Binh Ba

The Battle of Binh Ba, also known as Operation Hammer, was a hard-fought, but one-sided, battle. Troops from the 5th Battalion, Royal Australian Regiment (5RAR) fought a PAVN/VC force in the village of Binh Ba, 5 kilometres (3.1 mi) north of Nui Dat in Phuoc Tuy Province resulting in 107 PAVN/VC killed and eight captured for the loss of one Australian killed.

7 June

Dan Bullock was the youngest U.S. serviceman to be killed in the war at age 15. Having lied about his age to join the Marine Corps he was killed in a sapper attack at An Hoa Combat Base.

Following a rocket and artillery barrage, at 04:30 two battalions of the PAVN 88th Regiment attacked Firebase Crook, but were forced back by gunship fire. PAVN losses were 323 killed without loss among U.S. forces.

8 June

Following a meeting at Midway Island between Nixon and Thiệu, Nixon announced that 25,000 American troops would be withdrawn from South Vietnam by the end of August, starting the process of Vietnamization.

First Lieutenant Sharon Ann Lane, an army nurse at the 312th Evacuation Hospital at Chu Lai Base Area, was killed in a PAVN rocket attack. She was the only U.S. servicewoman killed by hostile fire during the war.

The PAVN 90th Regiment attacked the night defensive position of the 1st Battalion, 5th Marines in the "Arizona Territory" northeast of An Hoa Combat Base. The Marines repelled the assault and pursued the PAVN throughout the day resulting in more than 185 PAVN killed.

10 June

The VC announced that it had selected leaders for its "Provisional Revolutionary Government of the Republic of South Vietnam" (PRG), a "government in exile" to assume leadership if the VC and North Vietnam were successful in conquering South Vietnam. Former South Vietnamese lawyer and VC president Nguyễn Hữu Thọ was named as chairman of the advisory council to the PRG, and Huỳnh Tấn Phát was named the PRG Council President.

11 June

The PAVN 35th Sapper Battalion attacked the 3rd Battalion, 21st Infantry Regiment and 3rd Battalion, 82nd Artillery on Landing Zone East killing 16 U.S. for the loss of 27 PAVN killed.

12 June to 6 July

The 1st Battalion, 9th Marines, elements of the 1st Brigade, 5th Infantry Division and the ARVN 2nd Regiment launch Operation Utah Mesa against the PAVN 24th Regiment near Khe Sanh. The operation results in 309 PAVN killed and 14 U.S. killed.

13 June

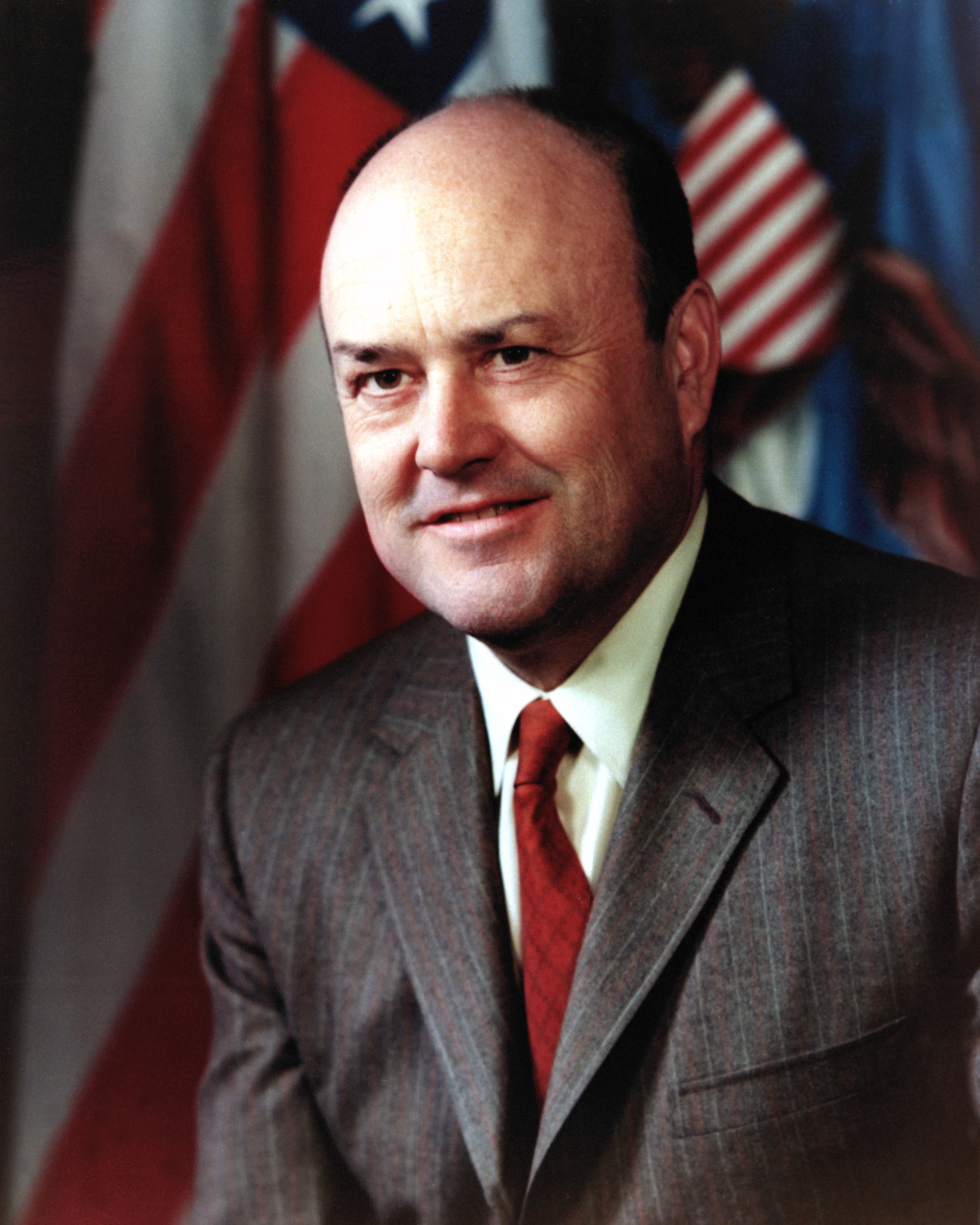
Secretary of Defense Melvin Laird

Laird announced that the first U.S. forces to leave South Vietnam would be 900 infantrymen from the 9th Infantry Division.

Prime Minister of Laos Souvanna Phouma acknowledged that U.S. aircraft regularly carried out bombing missions over Laos.

14-15 June

PAVN forces twice attacked 101st Airborne positions east of Dong Ap Bia losing 81 killed for 18 U.S. killed.

15 June to 25 September

Operation Iroquois Grove was a 1st Brigade, 5th Infantry Division (Mechanized) and 2nd Battalion, 5th Marines clear and search operation against PAVN Base Area 101 southeast of Quảng Trị City. the operation resulted in 134 PAVN and 13 U.S. killed.

16 June

Approximately 500 VC attacked the base of the Royal Thai Army Black Panther Division. The attack was repulsed with artillery and air support, resulting in 212 VC killed and six Thais killed.

18 June to 15 August

The 101st Airborne Division launched Operation Montgomery Rendezvous in western Thừa Thiên Province to interdict PAVN infiltration routes and forestall attacks on Huế. The operation results in 393 PAVN killed and 87 U.S. killed.

18-27 June

Campaign Toan Thang was the first PAVN wet season offensive of the Laotian Civil War. The PAVN 312th Division captured Muang Soui from the RLA.

19 June

The PAVN 4th Regiment attacked Firebase Tomahawk occupied by the 2nd Battalion, 501st Infantry Regiment and 2nd Battalion, 138th Artillery. The assault was repulsed for the loss of 13 U.S. (including 9 National Guardsmen from the 138th Artillery) and 23 PAVN killed.

19-21 June

The PAVN began shelling Tây Ninh Combat Base and then on 21 June launched a ground assault which was repulsed resulting in 194 PAVN and 10 U.S. killed.

20 June - September

The Green Beret Affair began when Chu Van Thai Khac, a South Vietnamese agent suspected of being a double agent, was abducted by three Special Forces soldiers, drugged, shot and his body dumped in Nha Trang bay. On learning of the murder, eight men were arrested including 5th Special Forces Group commander, Colonel Robert B. Rheault. Army defense lawyers for the eight soldiers called General Abrams and CIA officials to the witness stand. Both declined to get involved in the proceedings and testify. Finally in September 1969, Secretary of the Army Stanley Resor announced that all charges would be dropped against the eight soldiers since the CIA, in the interests of national security, had refused to make its personnel available as witnesses, making a fair trial impossible.

21-6 June

Operation Left Jab was an RLA operation to interdict the Sihanouk Trail in southern Laos. The operation succeeded in temporarily disrupting PAVN logistics routes into Cambodia.

25 June

The U.S. Navy transferred 64 Riverine Assault Craft to the Republic of Vietnam Navy.

27 June

Life magazine published the photographs of 242 Americans killed in one week in Vietnam; this is now considered a watershed event of negative public opinion toward the war.

28 June

A Gallup poll showed that 61% of Americans opposed a total withdrawal from South Vietnam, 29% favored total withdrawal and 10% were undecided.

29 June to 30 August

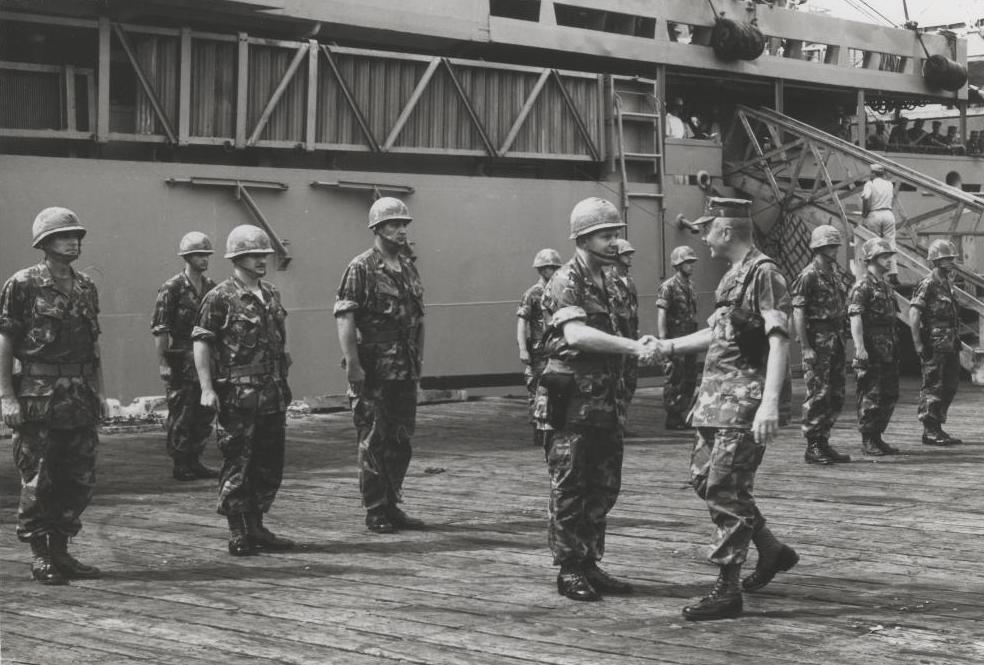
3rd Marine Division commander MG William K. Jones farewell 2/9 Marines commander at Da Nang

In Operation Keystone Eagle the initial units of the 3rd Marine Division withdrew from South Vietnam.

30 June

PAVN/VC mortar shells destroyed the Phuoc Long pagoda in Chanh Hiep, Bình Dương Province; one Buddhist monk was killed and ten persons wounded. Three members of the People's Self-Defense Force were kidnapped from Phu My, Biên Hòa Province.

Two U.S. military policemen were shot and killed by an ARVN Lieutenant colonel during a conflict at a nightclub in Saigon.

== July ==
1-15 July

Operation Off Balance was an unsuccessful RLA offensive to recapture Muang Soui.

2 July

Democratic senator George McGovern stated that he met with North Vietnamese and VC negotiators in Paris in May and that productive negotiations would not occur without the start of unconditional U.S. withdrawal and distancing from the South Vietnamese government.

2 July

Laird asked the Joint Chiefs of Staff for "a broad and deep reassessment of our military strategy and the employment of our land, sea and air forces in SEA," noting the nation was confronted with a series of unique and important trends which make such a reassessment desirable, "perhaps even mandatory."

3 July to 21 September

Operation Arlington Canyon was a 2nd Battalion 4th Marines and 3rd Battalion 4th Marines clear and search and security operation around Vandegrift Combat Base. The operation resulted in 23 PAVN and ten Marines killed.

8 July

An infantry battalion numbering 814 men from the US Army's 9th Infantry Division, the first of 25,000 American troops to be withdrawn from South Vietnam, arrived at McChord Air Force Base at 18:30 in a C-141 transport plane.

11 July

In a televised speech Thiệu challenged the VC to participate in elections organized by a joint electoral commission and subject to international supervision. Foreign Minister Trần Chánh Thành subsequently stated that communists could not participate in the elections or their organization.

12 July

Royal Lao Air Force Major Lee Lue was killed by PAVN/Pathet Lao antiaircraft fire in his T-28D near Muang Soui. At the time of his death he had flown over 5,000 combat sorties.

13 July to 15 August

The 2nd Brigade, 101st Airborne Division and ARVN 54th Regiment, 1st Division launched Operation Campbell Streamer in the Bạch Mã area near Huế. The operation results in 51 PAVN killed and one captured.

15 July

Kỳ criticized Thiệu's 11 July offer to the VC to participate in elections as contrary to the government's anti-communist stance.

16 July to 25 September

Operation Georgia Tar was a 4th Marine Regiment and 3rd Battalion, 9th Marines clear and search operation northeast of Khe Sanh. the operation resulted in 40 PAVN and one Marine killed.

19 July

A VC unit attacked the Chieu Hoi center in Vĩnh Bình Province killing five persons, including two women and a youth, and wounding 11 civilians.

20 July

A race riot at Marine Corps Base Camp Lejeune resulted in the death of one Marine.

The Navy issued the plan for Operation Duck Hook a program of massive bombing of North Vietnam commissioned by National Security Advisor Henry Kissinger.

21 July to 21 September

Operation Strangle was conducted by the U.S. 1st Infantry Division and the ARVN 8th Regiment, 5th Division in Bình Dương Province. The operation resulted in 365 PAVN/VC killed and 35 captured.

21 July to 25 September

The 3rd Marine Division and elements of the 1st Brigade, 5th Infantry Division launch Operation Idaho Canyon in north-central Quảng Trị Province. The operation results in 563 PAVN killed.

23 July to 10 March 1971

The 198th Light Infantry Brigade launches Operation Nantucket Beach on the Batangan Peninsula. The operation results in 630 PAVN/VC killed, U.S. losses are 51 killed.

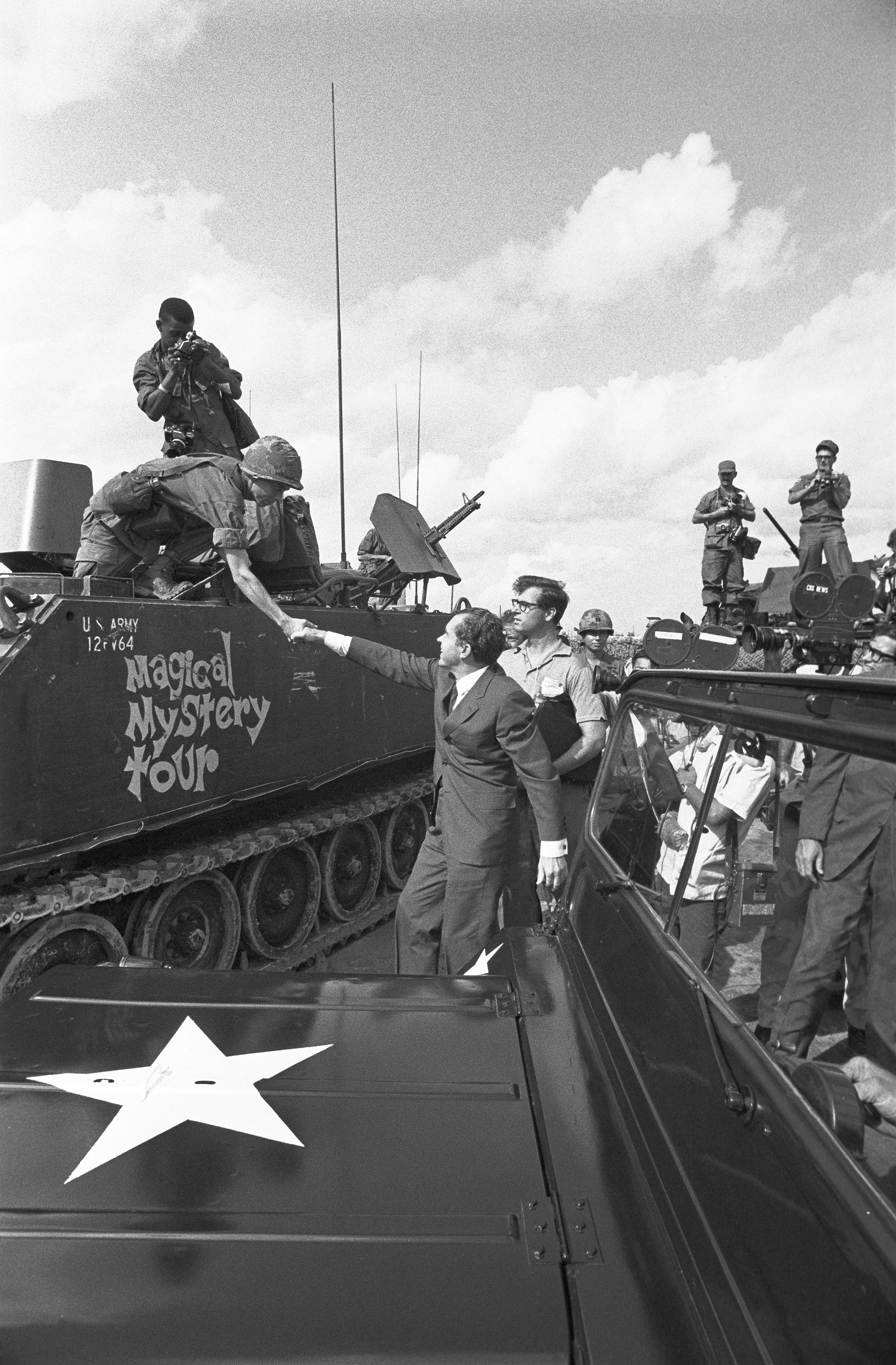
President Nixon greets U.S. troops at Dĩ An Base Camp

25 July

What would become known as the "Nixon Doctrine" was outlined for the first time in an informal press conference with reporters who had accompanied Nixon to Guam during his Asian tour. In remarks later published, but given at the time "for attribution but not direct quotation", Nixon said, "I believe that the time has come when the United States, in our relations with all of our Asian friends, be quite emphatic on two points: One, that we will keep our treaty commitments... but, two, that as far as the problems of internal security are concerned, as far as the problems of military defense... that the United States is going to encourage and has a right to expect that... the responsibility for it taken by, the Asian nations themselves."

28 July - 17 October

Operation Junction City Jr. was mounted by the RLA in an attempt to neutralize the PAVN logistics hub at Tchepone. The PAVN lost material and an estimated 500 killed but managed to withdraw most of their forces from the area.

30 July

Nixon made his only presidential visit to South Vietnam, meeting U.S. personnel at Dĩ An Base Camp.

The PAVN/VC rocketed the refugee center of Hung My, Bình Dương, wounding 76 persons.

== August ==
4 August

Kissinger secretly met with North Vietnam's former foreign minister, Xuan Thuy, to bypass the deadlocked Paris Peace Talks.

5 August

North Vietnam released three American prisoners of war to peace activist Rennie Davis, among them was U.S. Navy seaman Doug Hegdahl who had memorized the names of other prisoners.

6 August - 30 September

Operation Kou Kiet was an RLA offensive with extensive U.S. air support that succeeded in capturing the Plain of Jars from PAVN/Pathet Lao forces.

7 August

A VC sapper attack on Cam Ranh Bay penetrated the north perimeter and the sappers threw Satchel charges into the 6th Convalescent Center killing two Americans and wounding 98 and damaging 19 buildings for no VC losses.

A series of explosions was detonated outside an adult education school for Vietnamese military in Chợ Lớn, killing eight and wounding 60.

12-14 August

On the 12th the 1st Battalion, 7th Marines were attacked by the PAVN 8th and 9th Battalions, 90th Regiment and 1st Battalion, 368E Artillery (Rocket) Regiment in the "Arizona Territory". The Marines repelled the attack and killed 203 PAVN and captured two and 72 weapons in a daylong battle. On the 13th the Marines engaged a 100 strong PAVN force in a seven hour battle, killing 73 for the loss of five Marines killed. On the 14th the PAVN attacked again losing 13 killed and ten weapons.

13 August

Officials in Saigon reported a total of 17 PAVN/VC terror attacks on refugee centers in Quảng Nam and Thừa Thiên Provinces, leaving 23 persons dead, 75 injured and a large number of homes destroyed or damaged.

17-26 August

The 196th Light Infantry Brigade, 23rd Infantry Division (Americal) and ARVN 5th Regiment, 2nd Division killed more than 650 PAVN/VC from the 1st Regiment and 3rd Regiment, 2nd Division, in an operation in the Quế Sơn Valley for the loss of 60 U.S. killed. The 7th Marines conducted supporting operations in the Hiệp Đức District.

18 August

HMM-362, the last Marine squadron to operate the UH-34 helicopter held a decommissioning ceremony for the type at Phu Bai Combat Base.

21 August

Operation Camden was a 1 ATF military operation in support of the 501 Land Clearing Company, United States Army Corps of Engineers who were undertaking land clearing operations in the Hat Dich Area.

The VC infiltrated Ho Phong, Bạc Liêu Province, and killed three People's Self-Defense Force members and wounded two others.

22 August

Tran Van Huong was fired as prime minister by President Thiệu. ARVN General Tran Thien Khiem was appointed in his place the next day to head a new government.

24 August

The first publicized combat refusal of American soldiers in the war took place when "A" Company of the 196th Light Infantry Brigade, 23rd Infantry Division refused to obey the orders of their lieutenant. The battalion commander, Lieutenant Colonel Robert C. Bacon, traveled to the area the next day and reassigned the Lieutenant to another position.

25 August to 25 December

Operation Lien Ket 414 was conducted by the ARVN 4th Regiment, 2nd Division in Quảng Ngãi Province. The operation resulted in 710 PAVN/VC killed.

Operation Lien Ket 531 was conducted by the ARVN 5th Regiment, 2nd Division in Quảng Tín Province. The operation resulted in 542 PAVN/VC killed.

26 August

The VC attacked Hoa Phat, Quảng Nam Province; a nine-month-old baby, three children between ages six and ten, two men and a woman, a total of seven, were all shot at least once in the back of the head.

== September ==
2 September

With the outcome of the war still in question, Chairman of the Workers' Party of Vietnam Hồ Chí Minh died on the morning of 2 September 1969, at his home in Hanoi at age 79 from heart failure.

3 September

Commandant of the Marine Corps General Leonard F. Chapman, Jr., authorized Afro haircuts and the use of the raised fist as a greeting among black Marines.

5 September

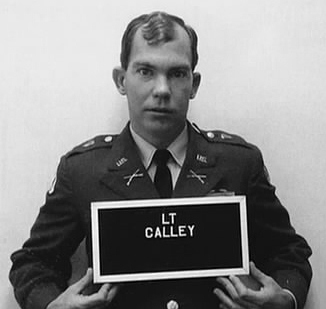
William Calley

U.S. Army Lieutenant William Calley was charged with six counts of premeditated murder for the 1968 My Lai Massacre.

6 September

PAVN/VC rocket and mortar hit the training center of the National Police Field Force in Dalat, killing five trainees and wounding 26.

North Vietnam announced that Ho Chi Minh would be succeeded by a committee consisting of Lê Duẩn, Trường Chinh, Võ Nguyên Giáp and Phạm Văn Đồng, in fact Lê Duẩn had effectively led the North Vietnamese government since 1964 with Ho being largely a figurehead.

9 September

South Vietnamese officials reported that nearly 5,000 South Vietnamese civilians have been killed by PAVN/VC terror during 1969.

Funeral services for Ho Chi Minh were held in Ba Đình Square, Hanoi attended by more than 250,000 mourners. Foreign dignitaries in attendance included Alexei Kosygin, Premier of the Soviet Union, Li Xiannian, Vice Premier of China, Gustáv Husák, General Secretary of the Communist Party of Czechoslovakia, Ignacy Loga-Sowiński, Deputy Premier of Poland, Ion Gheorghe Maurer, Prime Minister of Romania, Sihanouk and Souvanna Phouma.

14 September

A shaped charge on the perimeter of Firebase Gela accidentally discharged killing eight U.S. soldiers.

14 September - 25 April 1970

Campaign 139 was a PAVN combined arms rainy season offensive to recapture the Plain of Jars. The PAVN were eventually forced back with extensive air support but they had succeeded in inflicting heavy losses on the RLA.

15 September

The PAVN 18th Regiment attacked a South Vietnamese training center 6 miles (9.7 km) north of Tri Tôn. The attack was repulsed with the PAVN losing 83 killed.

16 September

Nixon announced plans to withdraw a further 35,000 U.S. troops.

19 September

Nixon cancelled the November and December Draft calls.

20 September

74 of 75 persons on an Air Vietnam Douglas DC-4 were killed after a mid-air collision with a USAF F-4 Phantom. Both aircraft were approaching Da Nang Air Base when the F-4 clipped the wing of the DC-4 causing it to crash into a field, killing two farmers on the ground.

The PAVN/VC attacked Tu Van refugee center in Quảng Ngãi Province, killing 8 persons and wounding two, all families of local People's Self-Defense Force members. In nearby Bình Sơn District, eight members of a police official's family were killed.

20 September - 9 March 1970

Operation Diamond Arrow was an RLA operation to retain control of the strategic road intersection of Routes 16 and 23 at Thatheng in southern Laos. The RLA successfully defended Thatheng and killed an estimated 500 PAVN/Pathet Lao for the loss of 40 killed and 30 missing but ultimately abandoned the position on 4 April.

24 September

A bus hit a mine on Highway 1, north of Đức Thọ, Quảng Ngãi Province killing 12 passengers.

The trial of the Chicago Seven began.

25 September

Republican senator Charles Goodell proposed legislation requiring all U.S. forces to withdraw from South Vietnam by the end of 1970. Nixon described this attitude as defeatist.

27 September

Thiệu stated that with proper funding and equipment, South Vietnamese forces could largely take over from U.S. forces by the end of 1970.

29 September

Merle Haggard and The Strangers release Okie from Muskogee, a response to antiwar protests.

29 September to 31 December

Operation Quyet Thang 21/38 was conducted by the ARVN 32nd Regiment, 21st Division in An Xuyên Province. The operation resulted in 721 PAVN/VC killed.

30 September

The U.S. and Thai governments announced that 6,000 USAF personnel would be withdrawn from Thailand by 10 July 1970.

30 September to 27 November

In Operation Keystone Cardinal the remaining units of the 3rd Marine Division withdrew from South Vietnam.

== October ==
Air Force Magazine published the story "The forgotten Americans of the Vietnam War" about U.S. POWs. The story was read into the Congressional Record and republished in the November issue of Reader's Digest raising the profile of U.S. POWs and MIAs.

2 October

A U.S. Navy C-2A Greyhound crashed into the Gulf of Tonkin on a flight from Naval Air Station Cubi Point to the aircraft carrier USS Constellation killing all 27 on board.

Hanna E. Crews a Donut Dolly died of head injuries after a vehicle accident near Bien Hoa, becoming the first of three Donut Dollies to die in the war.

8-11 October

The Weatherman faction of the Students for a Democratic Society launch the Days of Rage protests in Chicago to "bring the war home".

10 October

On the advice of Kissinger, Nixon issued secret orders to the Joint Chiefs of Staff to commence Operation Giant Lance, the sending of bombers armed with nuclear weapons toward Moscow in an effort to convince the Soviet leaders that he was not reluctant to launch a nuclear war in an effort to end the ongoing war. A squadron of 18 B-52 bombers, each carrying nuclear bombs, would be sent out on 27 October.

12 October

Anti-war protesters invaded a U.S. Army base for the first time, as an estimated 5,000 anti-war demonstrators crossed into the boundaries of the base at Fort Dix, New Jersey. The group was driven back by about 1,000 military policemen with tear gas, and there were no arrests and no injuries.

13 October

A grenade was thrown in the Vi Thanh District Chieu Hoi center, killing three civilians and wounding 46. The VC kidnapped a Catholic priest and a lay assistant, from the church at Phu Hoi, Biên Hòa Province.

15 October

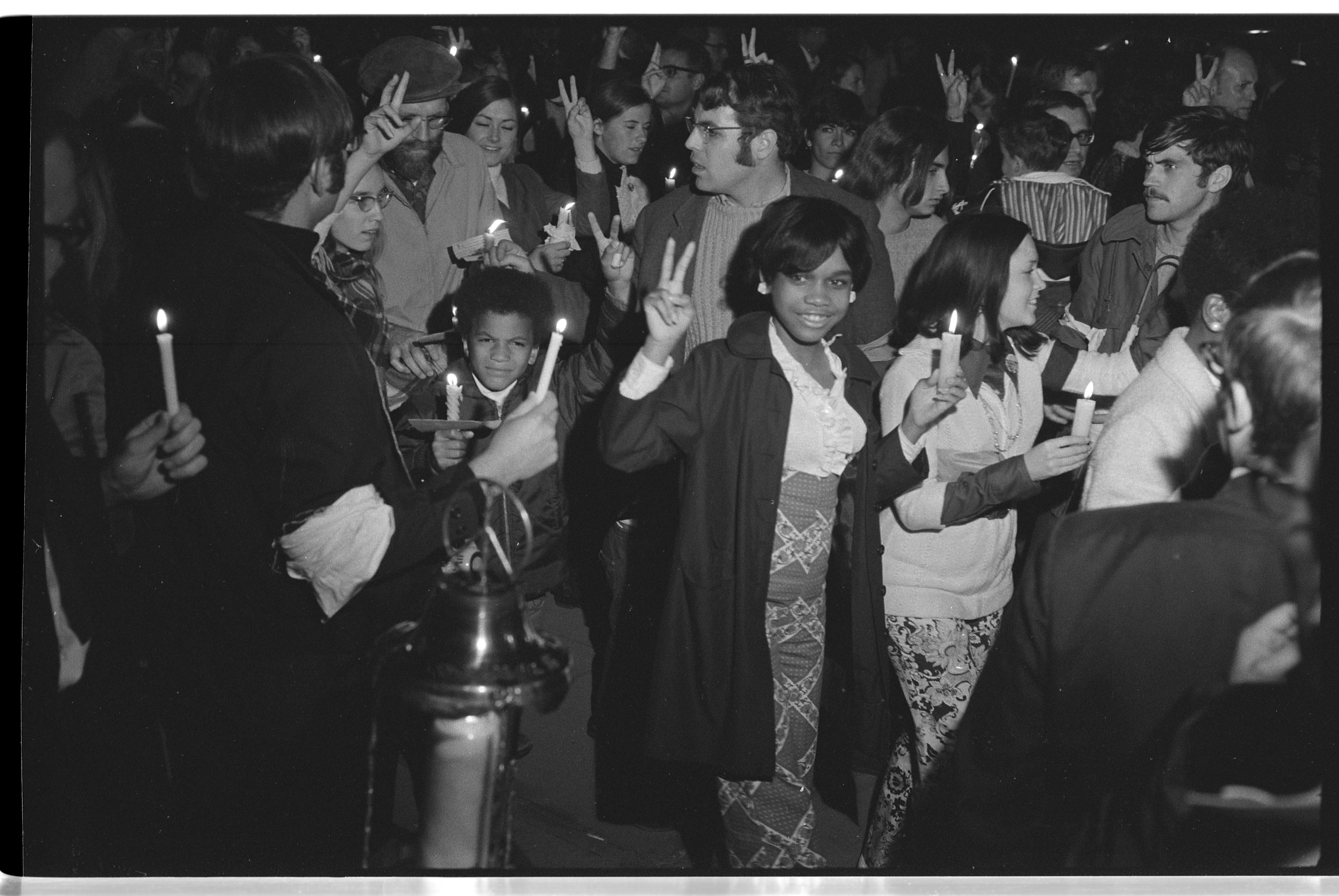
Moratorium protestors

Hundreds of thousands of people took part in the Moratorium to End the War in Vietnam demonstrations across the U.S. on a regular workday. Estimates of turnouts were 250,000 in Washington DC and 100,000 in Boston.

16 October

Laird announced that a residual force of 6-7,000 U.S. troops would remain in South Vietnam after the end of hostilities.

16 October to 6 January 1970

Operation Cramer White was a 1st Squadron, 10th Cavalry Regiment security operation along Route 14. The operation resulted in 52 PAVN/VC and two U.S. killed.

22 October to 18 January 1970

The 1st Brigade, 5th Infantry Division, 101st Airborne Division and ARVN 1st Division launched Operation Fulton Square in the lowlands of Quảng Trị Province. The operation resulted in 384 PAVN killed and 28 U.S. killed.

23 October

U.S. field commanders denied that there had been any changes in strategy and tactics, other than not making ground assaults on fortified PAVN/VC base areas which would be bombed instead. Many claimed to have been unaware of the concept of "protective reaction" and while the battlefield situation had reduced in intensity, it was nowhere near a ceasefire.

27 October

The PAVN/VC booby-trapped the body of a People's Self-Defense Force member whom they'd killed. When relatives came to retrieve the body the subsequent explosion killed four of them.

27 October - 1 November

The PAVN besieged Landing Zone Kate occupied by the 5th Special Forces Detachments A-233 and A-236 and their Montagnard forces and elements of the 5th Battalion, 22nd Artillery and 1st Battalion, 92nd Artillery. The base was abandoned on the night of 1 November and the US and Montagnard forces evacuated towards the nearby Bu Prang Camp.

October–December

The PAVN besiege Duc Lap Camp.

== November ==
1 November to 28 December

Operation Dan Tien 33D was conducted by the ARVN 23rd Division in Quang Duc Province. The operation resulted in 746 PAVN/VC killed.

1 November to 1 May 1970

Following the conclusion of Operation Toan Thang III, U.S. and ARVN forces begin Operation Toan Thang IV with largely the same forces and objectives. When the operation concludes on May 1, 1970 14,479 PAVN/VC have been killed for the loss of 685 U.S. killed.

3 November

Nixon addressed the nation on television and radio at 9:30 p.m., Washington time, to announce his plans to end American involvement in the war. Nixon gave his reasons for rejecting immediately removing all troops, framing that option as the "first defeat in our Nation's history" that "would result in a collapse of confidence in American leadership, not only in Asia but throughout the world." Nixon instead reiterated his plan for Vietnamization, "the complete withdrawal of all U.S. combat ground forces and their replacement by South Vietnamese forces on an orderly scheduled timetable" but added that he did not intend to announce details of the timetable. In closing, he described the people who would support his plan for a drawdown as "the great silent majority of my fellow Americans", in contrast to a "vocal minority" of protesters which, if their will prevailed "over reason and the will of the majority", would mean that the United States would have "no future as a free society." A Gallup poll the next day showed that 77% of Americans supported Nixon's Vietnam policy.

6 November

A PAVN sapper attack on Firebase St. George occupied by the 1st Battalion, 14th Infantry and 1st Battalion, 9th Artillery resulted in nine U.S. killed.

MACV announced that it was holding back on sending U.S. ground forces to reinforce Duc Lap Camp as a test of the ARVN's abilities to handle higher intensity combat.

The House Foreign Affairs Committee approved a resolution supporting Nixon's Vietnam policy.

7 November

Senior U.S. commanders in South Vietnam said that all ground combat forces could be pulled out by mid-1971.

Five VC platoons numbering some 200 men attacked Saigon's District 7 but were repulsed by National Police.

The PAVN attacked an ARVN riverine base 138 miles (222 km) southwest of Saigon killing 25 defenders.

12 November to 28 December

Operation Dan Tien 40 was conducted by the ARVN 23rd Division in Quang Duc Province. The operation resulted in 1,012 PAVN/VC killed.

13 November

The story of the 1968 My Lai Massacre was revealed to the public by freelance American investigative reporter Seymour Hersh, who was contributing to the Dispatch News Service. The New York Times published a similar report at the same time.

14 November

RVNAF fighter-bombers supporting ARVN forces at Bu Prang Camp hit both ARVN and PAVN forces in an airstrike killing 20 ARVN and an estimated 95 PAVN.

Police used tear gas against protesters marching on the South Vietnamese embassy in Washington D.C. and arrested 30 protesters.

15 November

In Washington, D.C., more than 500,000 protesters staged "the largest peace march on Washington in American history" for the second "Moratorium to End the War in Vietnam". The event, which was also held on a smaller scale in other American cities, included a symbolic "March Against Death".

16 November

A PAVN sapper attack on Camp Radcliff destroyed or damaged 20 U.S. helicopters.

18 November

The ARVN killed 82 PAVN/VC in a sweep 15 miles (24 km) south of Da Nang. U.S. helicopter gunships killed a further 124 PAVN/VC.

20 November

The Plain Dealer published Ronald L. Haeberle's photos of the My Lai massacre.

24 November

Lieutenant General William R. Peers was appointed by the Secretary of the Army and the Army Chief of Staff to conduct a thorough review of the My Lai Massacre.

26 November

A PAVN sapper attack on a U.S. armored cavalry unit near the Cambodian border destroyed more than 12 tanks in a munitions explosion.

28-9 November

The PAVN/VC ambushed a 300 man ARVN force 72 miles (116 km) southwest of Saigon, killing 36 ARVN. The ARVN then pursued the PAVN/VC killing 45.

29 November

Huynh Van Trong, a former aide to Thiệu and 42 others went on trial for spying for the VC in South Vietnam's largest espionage trial.

== December ==
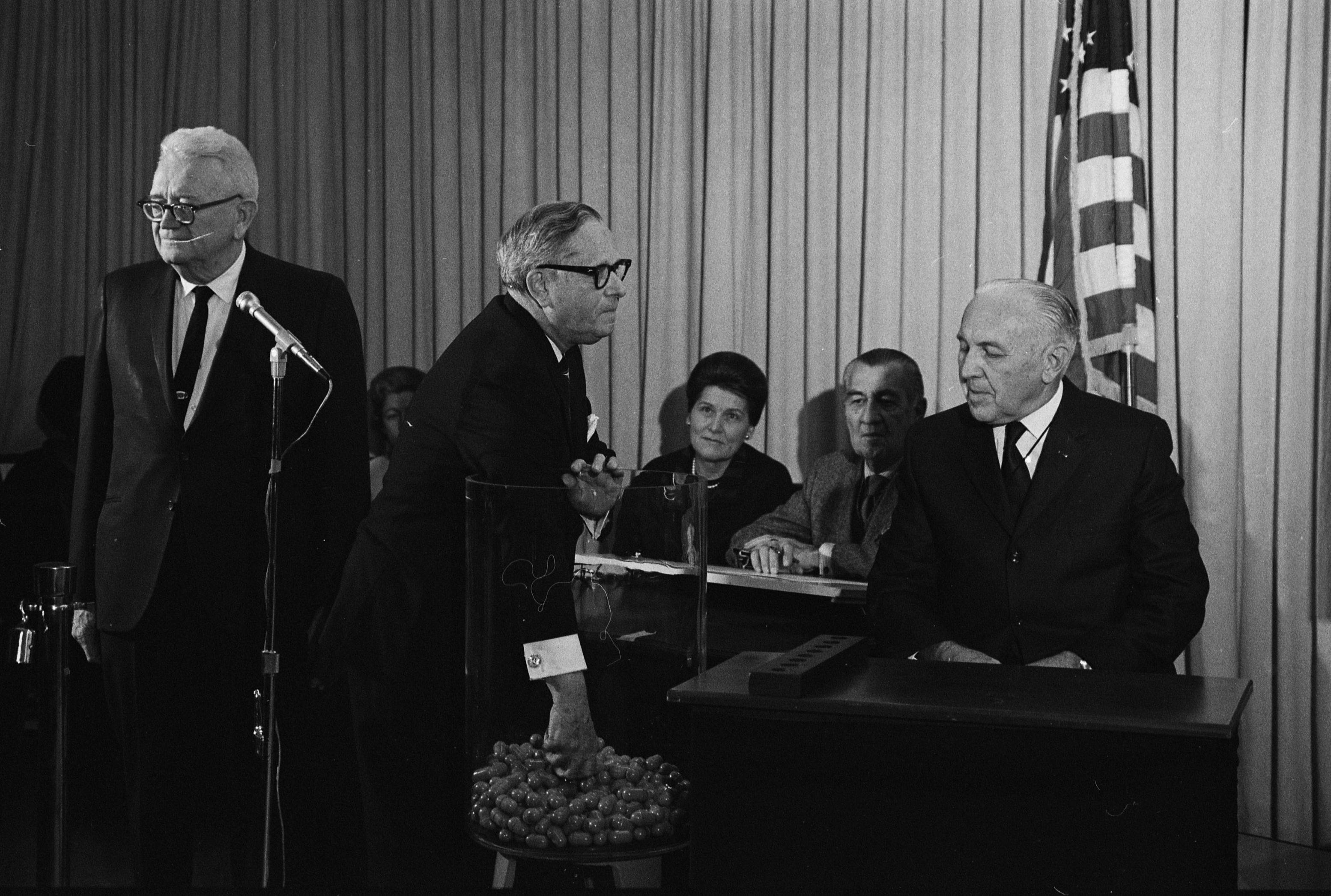
Congressman Alexander Pirnie (R-NY) drawing the first capsule for the Selective Service draft, Dec 1, 1969

1 December

The first draft lottery in the United States since 1942 (and the first in peacetime) was held, and September 14 was the first of the 366 days of the year selected, with Congressman Alexander Pirnie of New York making the first selection.

3 December

The PAVN/VC attacked Tuyen Binh in the Mekong Delta, the attack was repulsed with 108 PAVN/VC and 15 civilians killed.

7 December to 31 March 1970

Operation Randolph Glen was conducted by the 2nd Brigade, 101st Airborne Division and ARVN 1st Division to engage PAVN/VC units and interdict supply lines into the lowlands of Thừa Thiên Province. The operation results in 670 PAVN killed, U.S. losses are 123 killed and four missing.

12-20 December

The Philippines Civic Action Group withdrew from South Vietnam.

13 December

The South Vietnamese released a captured PAVN/VC strategy document, COSVN Directive No 55, that outlined a return to traditional guerilla warfare and propaganda.

14 December

The U.S. 23rd Infantry Division killed 53 PAVN/VC in a six hour long battle 2 miles (3.2 km) southeast of My Lai.

15 November

Nixon announced a third phase of U.S. troop withdrawals to withdraw a further 50,000 U.S. troops by 15 April 1970.

16 December

The ARVN 21st Division supported by airstrikes killed 46 PAVN/VC in the U Minh Forest.

20 December

VPAF pilot Nguyễn Văn Cốc made his ninth kill becoming the highest-scoring VPAF ace of the war.

22 December

A bomb exploded on an Air Vietnam DC-6 descending into Nha Trang. The plane crashed into a school killing 24 at the school (most of them schoolchildren) and 10 of the 70 passengers.

24-6 December

The VC announced a three day Christmas truce, however Allied forces only observed a 24 hour truce starting at 18:00 on Christmas Day.

26 December - 5 January 1970

The SS Badger State under contract to Military Sea Transportation Service and carrying a load of munitions bound for Da Nang had a bomb explode onboard causing a fire. The crew abandoned ship with 29 crewmen killed and the ship drifted before sinking on 5 January.

28 December

The New York Times published an analysis of a series of articles by Võ Nguyên Giáp published from 14 to 20 December in Nhân Dân where he outlined a move to better trained, highly mobile forces. This was seen as being a response to North Vietnamese manpower shortages and losses during the Tet Offensive.

30 December to 1 January

The VC announced a three day New Year truce, however Allied forces only observed a 24 hour truce starting at 18:00 on 31 December.

== Year in numbers ==
| Armed Force | Strength | KIA | Reference | Military costs - 1968 | Military costs in 2020 US$ | Reference |
|---|---|---|---|---|---|---|
| South Vietnam | 897,000 | 21,833 |
| United States US Forces | 549,500 (January), 474,400 (December) | 11,780 |
| South Korea | 48,869 |
| Thailand | 11,568 |
| Australia | 7,672 |
| Philippines | 189 |
| New Zealand | 552 |
| North Vietnam | | 45,000+ |

== See also ==
List of allied military operations of the Vietnam War (1969)
