= Firebase (U.S.-Vietnam War) =

Firebases in the U.S.-involvement Vietnam War, were a type of military base, usually fire bases.

It may refer to:

- Firebase 6, Central Highlands
- Firebase Airborne, central South Vietnam
- Firebase Argonne, Quảng Trị Province
- Firebase Atkinson, southwest South Vietnam
- Firebase Bastogne, Thua Thien Province
- Firebase Berchtesgaden (Firebase Eagle's Nest) Thừa Thiên–Huế
- Firebase Betty, Bình Thuận Province
- Firebase Bird, southern South Vietnam
- Firebase Birmingham, Thừa Thiên–Huế Province
- Firebase Checkmate, central South Vietnam
- Firebase Crook, southwest South Vietnam
- Firebase Cunningham, central South Vietnam
- Firebase Currahee, central South Vietnam
- Firebase Delta, Central Highlands
- Firebase Fuller, central South Vietnam
- Firebase Gela, southern South Vietnam
- Firebase Gio Linh, central South Vietnam
- Firebase Granite, central South Vietnam
- Firebase Hawk Hill, central South Vietnam
- Firebase Henderson, Quảng Trị Province
- Firebase Illingworth, southwest South Vietnam
- Firebase Jaeger, Dinh Tuong Province; involved in Operation Hop Tac I
- Firebase Jay, southwest South Vietnam
- Firebase Kate (Firebase White) Quang Duc Province; a.k.a. Landing Zone Kate
- Firebase Maureen, central South Vietnam
- Firebase Mile High, Central Highlands
- Firebase Neville, Quảng Trị Province
- Firebase Pedro, central South Vietnam
- Firebase Ripcord, Thua Thien Province
- Firebase Ross, Quảng Nam Province
- Firebase Russell, Quảng Trị Province
- Firebase Sarge (Firebase Dong Toan) central South Vietnam
- Firebase St. George, Central Highlands
- Firebase Thunder III, southern South Vietnam
- Firebase Tomahawk, central South Vietnam
- Firebase Veghel, central South Vietnam
- Firebase Vera, central South Vietnam

== See also ==
- The Siege of Firebase Gloria (1989 film) Australian film
