= Landing Zone East =

Former U.S. Army base in Vietnam

Site information
- Type: Army
- Condition: abandoned

Location
- Coordinates: 15.543°N 108.319°E

Site history
- Built: 1967
- In use: 1967-69
- Battles/wars: Vietnam War

Garrison information
- Occupants: 196th Infantry Brigade

Landing Zone East (also known as FSB East, LZ Mary Lou, Hill 488 or Howard's Hill) is a former U.S. Army base west of Tam Kỳ, Quảng Nam Province, Vietnam.

== History ==
The base was established in 1967 by the 196th Infantry Brigade and was located approximately 17 km west of Tam Kỳ and 7 km northeast of Tiên Phước Camp.

The base was occupied by elements of the 3rd Battalion, 21st Infantry Regiment and 3rd Battalion, 82nd Artillery when it was attacked by the People's Army of Vietnam (PAVN) 35th Sapper Battalion on the morning of 11 June 1969, resulting in 16 U.S. and 27 PAVN killed.

== Current use ==
The base is abandoned and has returned to jungle.
