= Firebase Mile High =

US Army firebase

Site information
- Type: Army
- Condition: abandoned

Location
- Coordinates: 14.398°N 107.719°E

Site history
- Built: 1968
- In use: 1968-70
- Battles/wars: Vietnam War

Garrison information
- Occupants: 1st Battalion, 35th Infantry

Firebase Mile High (also known as LZ Mile High or Hill 1198) was a U.S. Army firebase located northwest of Kontum in the Central Highlands of Vietnam.

== History ==
Mile High was established by the 1st Battalion, 35th Infantry in March 1968 approximately 32 km northwest of Kontum.

Other units based at Mile High included:

- 1st Battalion, 12th Infantry
- 4th Battalion, 4th Artillery

== Current use ==
The base has reverted to jungle.

== See also ==
- Landing Zone Brillo Pad
- Landing Zone Virgin
