= Operation Campbell Streamer =

Part of the Vietnam War (1969)

- Part of the Vietnam War
Date	13 July – 15 August 1969
Location	Bạch Mã, Thừa Thiên-Huế Province, South Vietnam

Belligerents
United States; South Vietnam	North Vietnam

Commanders and leaders
John M. Wright	

Units involved
(United States) 2nd Brigade, 101st Airborne Division (South Vietnam) 54th Regiment, 1st Infantry Division	4th Regiment

Casualties and losses
	US body count: 51 killed 1 captured 27 individual and 11 crew-served weapons recovered

Operation Campbell Streamer was a joint U.S. Army and Army of the Republic of Vietnam (ARVN) military operation during the Vietnam War to engage People's Army of Vietnam (PAVN) units in the Bạch Mã.

== Background ==
The PAVN 4th Regiment's base areas in the Bạch Mã posed an ongoing threat to Highway 1.

== Operation ==
The operation began with the combat assault of the 2nd Battalion, 502nd Infantry Regiment into Firebase Sledge (16.199°N 107.857°E) followed by the ARVN 1st and 3rd Battalions of the 54th Regiment into their respective landing zones. In the first phase a reconnaissance was mounted by the three assaulting elements to locate and destroy the PAVN forces on the north side of the Bạch Mã. Contact was very light during this phase. The second phase commenced on 27 June with the deployment of the 1st Battalion, 327th Infantry Regiment to a screening position south of the Bạch Mã in Elephant Valley and the three maneuver battalions reoriented to the south. On 28 July elements of the ARVN 1/54th made the first significant contact by killing 27 PAVN and capturing 22 individual and 9 crew-served weapons.

== Aftermath ==
Results as of 31 July 1969 were 51 PAVN/VC killed, 1 captured and 27 individual and 11 crew-served weapons captured.
