= Patrol Base Frontier City =

US Army base in Vietnam

Site information
- Type: Army Base

Location
- Coordinates: 11.117°N 106.098°E

Site history
- Built: 1969
- In use: 1969
- Battles/wars: Vietnam War

Garrison information
- Occupants: 4th Battalion, 9th Infantry

Patrol Base Frontier City is a former U.S. Army base southeast of Tây Ninh in southern Vietnam.

== History ==
The base was established on 24 April 1969 by the 4th Battalion, 9th Infantry 25 km southeast of Tây Ninh and 3 km east of the Parrot's Beak, Cambodia.

On the night of 25 April 1969 the base was attacked by elements of the People's Army of Vietnam (PAVN) 271st Regiment. The attack was countered with intensive fire from Douglas AC-47 Spooky and Fairchild AC-119 gunships and helicopter gunships. The PAVN charged across open ground to the base defensive wire where they were engaged by Claymore mines and direct fire. The PAVN retreated with the loss of 214 killed and 6 captured, only 1 U.S. defender was wounded.

The base was abandoned on 15 May 1969.

== Current use ==
The base has reverted to farmland.
