= Patrol Base Diamond I =

Site information
- Type: Army Base

Location
- Coordinates: 11.025°N 106.219°E

Site history
- Built: 1969
- In use: 1969
- Battles/wars: Vietnam War

Garrison information
- Occupants: 2nd Battalion, 27th Infantry Regiment

Patrol Base Diamond I (also known as Firebase Diamond I) is a former U.S. Army base southeast of Tây Ninh in southern Vietnam.

== History ==
The base was established in 1969 25 km southeast of Tây Ninh and 3 km east of the Parrot's Beak, Cambodia during Operation Toan Thang III.

In the early morning of 23 February 1969 the base was occupied by the 2nd Battalion, 27th Infantry Regiment when it was attacked by elements of the People's Army of Vietnam (PAVN) 271st and 272nd Regiments. The attack began at 01:15 with the PAVN infiltrating the perimeter and taking over three bunkers on the southeast corner. The attack was countered with gunship fire and 1,435 rounds of artillery fire. The PAVN withdrew at approximately 05:15 and a sweep of the area found 109 PAVN dead, 12 AK-47 rifles, five RPG-2 launchers, two RPG-7 launchers, two K-54 pistols, one 60mm mortar and assorted weapons and munitions. U.S. losses were 15 killed. At 20:50 on 24 February artillery at the base fired Killer Junior rounds at a PAVN force gathering for an attack on the base. At approximately 00:15 the PAVN attacked the base again killing one U.S. and destroying one howitzer with RPG fire.

== Current use ==
The base has reverted to farmland.
