= Operation Iron Mountain =

Part of the Vietnam War (1969–1971)

- Part of the Vietnam War
Date	28 February 1969 – 28 February 1971
Location	Quảng Ngãi Province, South Vietnam
Result	US operational success

Belligerents
United States	North Vietnam; Viet Cong

Units involved
11th Light Infantry Brigade	21st Regiment; 403rd Sapper Battalion; 40th Sapper Battalion; 38th Local Force Battalion

Casualties and losses
440 killed	4,589 killed 137 captured

Operation Iron Mountain was a security operation during the Vietnam War in Quảng Ngãi Province, that took place from 28 February 1969 to 28 February 1971.

== Background ==
The 11th Light Infantry Brigade was tasked with conducting search and clear operations in the area of operations in southeastern Quảng Ngãi Province to destroy People's Army of Vietnam (PAVN) and Vietcong (VC) bases and forces, interdict PAVN/VC supply routes from the Central Highlands to the populated coastal areas and maintain liaison with Army of the Republic of Vietnam (ARVN) Ranger camps in the highlands.

== Operation ==
=== 1969 ===
On 29 March at 11:55, an element of the brigade engaged an unknown size PAVN force 5 miles (8.0 km) west of Đức Phổ Base Camp. The troops, supported by helicopter gunships and airstrikes killed 3 PAVN for the loss of 4 US killed. At 14:00, helicopter gunship crews of the 16th Combat Aviation Group observed an unknown-size PAVN/VC force 8 miles (13 km) northeast of Quảng Ngãi. The force was engaged with rocket and machine gun fire and the bodies of 26 PAVN/VC soldiers were observed lying in the strike area.

On 12 May at 02:20, a firebase 6 miles (9.7 km) southeast of Quảng Ngãi received mortar fire followed by a ground attack from an unknown-size PAVN/VC force. The attack was repulsed and 23 PAVN/VC killed for no US losses. At 09:00, an element of the brigade while sweeping an area about 4 miles (6.4 km) southeast of Đức Phổ engaged an estimated PAVN/VC company. The troops attacked supported by tanks and armored personnel carriers until the PAVN/VC broke contact at 16:00, leaving 18 dead and 1 crew-served weapon. US casualties were 7 killed.

On 4 June at 11:00 the brigade engaged a PAVN/VC force of unknown size 6 miles (9.7 km) southeast of Đức Phổ. Elements of the division's armored cavalry squadron (in tanks and armored personnel carriers) joined the fight while additional support came from helicopter gunships and artil1ery fire. At 16:00 the PAVN/VC withdrew, leaving 6 dead and 1 crew-served and 2 individual weapons, US casualties were 2 killed. On 7 June at 23:30 an element of the brigade in night defensive positions 4 miles (6.4 km) northwest of Đức Phổ observed an unknown-size PAVN/VC force moving outside their perimeter. The troopers defended their position and were supported by a USAF AC-47 Spooky gunship. At 00:30 the PAVN/VC withdrew, leaving 11 dead, and two individual and three crew-served weapons. On 9 June at 14:55 a reconnaissance element of the brigade, and a unit of the division's armored cavalry squadron engaged a PAVN/VC force 2 miles (3.2 km) west of Đức Phổ. In an exchange of heavy small arms and automatic weapons fire, the troopers attacked. At 17:45 the PAVN/VC withdrew. A sweep of the area by elements of the brigade and the ARVN 4th Regiment, 2nd Division found 61 PAVN/VC dead and 9 individual weapons and 4 crew-served weapons. US losses were 3 killed. On 10 June at 02:10 an element of the brigade in night defensive positions 4 miles (6.4 km) northwest of Đức Phổ received a round of mortar fire, followed by a stand-off attack of small arms and rocket-propelled grenade fire. The troopers defended and directed artillery fire onto the firing positions. In a sweep made later, 14 dead PAVN/VC soldiers were found, and one crew-served and three individual weapons captured. US casualties were 1 killed. On 13 June at 08:40 troopers of the brigade engaged an unknown-size PAVN/VC force 8 miles (13 km) south of Đức Phổ in an exchange of heavy small arms and automatic weapons fire. The PAVN/VC withdrew leaving 16 dead and 5 individual weapons, US losses were 1 killed.

On 19 July at 11:20 an element of the brigade, engaged an estimated PAVN/VC company 6 miles (9.7 km) northwest of Đức Phổ in an exchange of heavy small arms and automatic weapons fire. At 13:30, another element of the brigade enforced the action, and additional support came from U.S. artillery and helicopter gunships. At 19:30, the PAVN/VC withdrew, leaving 11 dead, along with 2 crew-served and 4 individual weapons. US casualties were 4 killed. On 22 July a brigade reconnaissance element discovered 5 PAVN/VC bodies in freshly-dug graves 3 miles (4.8 km) west southwest of Đức Phổ, all killed the previous day by artillery fire. On 23 July a Br1gade unit discovered a PAVN/VC tunnel complex 2 miles (3.2 km) southeast of Đức Phổ containing 12 PAVN/VC dead.

On 3 August brigade infantrymen discovered the bodies of 9 PAVN/VC in graves 11 miles (18 km) northwest of Đức Phổ; all appeared to have been killed by air strikes. On 8 August at 20:20 an element of the brigade patrolling 4 miles (6.4 km) north northwest of Đức Phổ, received small arms, automatic weapons and RPG fire from an unknown-size PAVN/VC force. The infantrymen fired back and the PAVN/VC withdrew, leaving 2 dead and an individual weapon, 2 US soldiers were killed. On 11 August at 12:15 an armored cavalry element received small arms, automatic weapons and RPG fire from an unknown-size PAVN/VC force 6 miles (9.7 km) west northwest of Quảng Ngãi. The troopers fired back with unit weapons, including tank guns and the heavy machine guns. At 15:15 the PAVN/VC withdrew, leaving 9 dead, US losses were 1 killed. On 12 August at 1530 the armored cavalry element of the brigade 6 miles (9.7 km) west northwest of Quảng Ngai engaged and killed 7 PAVN/VC. On 13 August at 11:45 elements of the brigade 5 miles (8.0 km) west northwest of Quảng Ngãi, engaged an unknown-size PAVN/VC force. Sporadic fighting continued throughout the day as the troopers fought back with unit weapons and were supported by helicopter gunships. The PAVN/VC withdrew leaving 8 dead, 8 individual weapons and 4 crew-served weapons. US losses were 5 dead.

On 1 September at 11:30 brigade air cavalry troopers engaged a PAVN/VC platoon 4 miles (6.4 km) southeast of Đức Phổ forcing them to withdraw leaving 6 dead for 1 US killed. A later search of the area found a further 14 PAVN/VC bodies. On 2 September at 1600 elements of the armored cavalry squadron engaged PAVN/VC 4 miles (6.4 km) south of Đức Phổ. Fighting continued until 19:30 when the PAVN/VC withdrew, leaving 22 dead and 9 individual and 2 crew-served weapons, US losses were 4 killed. On 3 September at 14:05 an air cavalry killed 7 PAVN/VC 2 miles (3.2 km) south of Đức Phổ. On 16 September at 09:10 an element of the brigade engaged an unknown-size PAVN/VC force 7 miles (11 km) west northwest of Đức Phổ, US losses were three killed. On 21 September at 19:10 a brigade night defensive position 14 miles (23 km) west of Đức Phổ was attacked by an unknown-size PAVN/VC force using small arms and about 45 rounds of mortar fire. The troopers fired back with unit weapons, and were supported by helicopter gunships and a USAF AC-119 gunship. US casualties were 11 killed. On 26 September at 12:00 a brigade reconnaissance element engaged an unknown-size PAVN/VC force 4 miles (6.4 km) east southeast of Đức Phổ, the PAVN/VC withdrew leaving 6 dead.

On 3 October at 11:00 12 miles (19 km) west northwest of Đức Phổ an element of the brigade, engaged 5 PAVN/VC soldiers with small arms, killing all of them. On 13 October at 05:20 a PAVN/VC force attacked a brigade night defensive position 10 miles (16 km) northwest of Đức Phổ killing 1 US soldier.

=== 1970 ===
On 2 January a brigade night defensive position 5 miles (8.0 km) south of Đức Phổ received about 60 rounds of mixed 60mm and 82mm mortar fire along with heavy small arms and automatic weapons fire from an unknown-size enemy force. The defenders returned fire and were supported by helicopter gunships and artillery. At 03:50 on 3 January the PAVN/VC withdrew leaving 29 dead and 9 individual weapons on the perimeter, US losses were 7 killed. On 28 January at 12:00 a brigade unit engaged 6 PAVN/VC 16 miles (26 km) west of Đức Phổ killing all six and capturing one individual weapon. On 31 January at 01:10 an estimated PAVN/VC platoon attacked an 11th Brigade night defensive position 1 mile (1.6 km) southeast of Đức Phổ with small arms, automatic weapons and RPGs. The defenders returned fire and at about 02:00 the PAVN/VC withdrew, leaving 7 dead, 3 individual weapons and one RPG launcher.

On 8 February at 07:30 an element of the brigade observed 8 PAVN/VC soldiers 7 miles (11 km) west northwest of Quảng Ngai and engaged them killing 7 for no US losses. At 08:30 an element of the 11th Brigade engaged 5 PAVN/VC 2 miles (3.2 km) southeast of Đức Phổ killing all 5 for no US losses. At 13:00 helicopter crewmen from the 16th Combat Aviation Group sighted one soldier entering a tunnel 12 miles (19 km) northwest of Đức Phổ, Troopers from the group were air-assaulted into the area and engaged an unknown-size PAVN/VC force. Contact continued until 14:40 when the remaining enemy withdrew, 5 PAVN/VC were killed and 7 suspects detained. On 18 February 1970 at 11:45 US artillery observers saw an unknown-size PAVN/VC force in several small groups moving south in an area 11 miles (18 km) west of Quảng Ngai, artillery fire was directed onto the enemy location and the bodies of 13 PAVN/VC soldiers were counted. At 20:30 a forward observer sighted an unknown-size PAVN/VC force moving in an area 11 miles west of Quảng Ngai. Artillery fire was directed onto the enemy location and the bodies of 21 PAVN/VC soldiers were observed lying in the area. On 19 February at 11:00 helicopter crewmen sighted 5 PAVN/VC soldiers 7 miles north of Đức Phổ, they were engaged and all 5 were killed and 3 weapons captured.

On 1 March at 19:05 an artillery forward observer saw 6-8 PAVN/VC soldiers 11 miles (18 km) west of Quảng Ngai and called in artillery fire killing 5 of them. On 5 March at 22:20 a brigade element ambushed an undetermined number of PAVN/VC 13 miles (21 km) west southwest of Quảng Ngai, the PAVN/VC withdrew leaving 2 dead and 2 individual weapons. At 21:30 a brigade night defensive position 16 miles (26 km) south of Quảng Ngai, received heavy small arms and automatic weapons fire from an undetermined size PAVN/VC force. The unit returned fire and were supported by helicopter gunships and a USAF AC-119 gunship. At 22:45 the PAVN/VC withdrew, US losses were 1 killed. On 9 March at 1315 helicopter gunship crewmen engaged an undetermined size enemy PAVN/VC 4 miles (6.4 km) south of Đức Phổ, the PAVN/VC withdrew leaving 5 dead. On 12 March between 12:10 and 17:50 artillery forward observers saw a total of 47 PAVN/VC 11 miles (18 km) west northwest of Quảng Ngai, all were killed by artillery fire.

On 1 April at 02:00 a PAVN/VC force attacked a brigade outpost 0.5 miles (0.80 km) north of Đức Phổ, US losses were 1 killed. On 2 April at 18:00 a PAVN/VC boobytrap killed 10 Allied soldiers operating in an area 13 miles (21 km) northwest of Đức Phổ. On 15 April at 13:00 a 105mm artillery round, rigged as a booby-trap, was detonated by an element of the brigade 2 miles (3.2 km) south of Đức Phổ killing 11 US soldiers.

On 16 September at 02:15, helicopter crewmen from an aviation element of the brigade engaged an estimated 10 PAVN/VC 21 miles (34 km) south southeast of Quảng Ngai. The bodies of the 10 soldiers were observed in the area after the strikes.

In the first week of November the brigade reported 8 PAVN/VC killed. On 8 November Company D, 4th Battalion, 3rd Infantry Regiment found 11 graves of PAVN/VC killed by artillery. On 10 November in a series of minor engagements 10 PAVN/VC were reported killed. On 12 November at 12:30, a 2.5 ton truck detonated a mine 4 miles (6.4 km) west of Quảng Ngai, 6 US personnel were killed and the truck was destroyed. On 22 November Company C, 4/3rd had three mechanical ambushes detonate which resulted in a total of 10 VC killed and the capture of assorted clothing, equipment and documents. Later the same day Recon Company, 3rd Battalion, 1st Infantry Regiment, while searching bunkers detonated an 82mm mortar round resulting in 4 US killed.

There were light and scattered contacts reported by the brigade from 7-10 December. On 11 December, Company C, 4/3rd uncovered a weapons cache containing 3 81mm mortars, 11 individual weapons and 2 PRC-10 radios. Company A, 3/1st found another cache containing 5 weapons. On 16 December elements of Troop F, 8th Cavalry Regiment engaged 5 VC which resulted in 5 VC killing all 5. Activity was light throughout the area of operations and was characterized by small scattered contacts until 24 December 1970 when Recon Company, 4th Battalion 21st Infantry Regiment, came under sniper fire losing 2 killed. At 18:00 on 24 December, Division units assumed a defensive role for the twenty-four hour Christmas Truce period and resumed offensive operations at 18:00 on 25 December. On 26 December a mechanical ambush set by Company C, 4/21st was triggered killing 3 VC. From 18:00 on 31 December until 18:00 on 1 January 1971 Division units observed the New Years truce period.

=== 1971 ===
On 4 January Company C, 1st Battalion, 20th Infantry Regiment, engaged 2 VC killing 1 and capturing 2 weapons. On 5 January Recon Company, 1/20th supported by aviation and artillery killed 7 PAVN and captured 1 weapon. On 8 January Company C, 4/21st detonated 2 105mm artillery rounds resulting in 2 killed. On 10 January in the late afternoon Recon Company, 1/20th killed 5 PAVN. On 12 January 174th Aviation Company gunships killed 4 PAVN and captured 4 individual weapons. On 14 January Company A, 4/3rd found 5 weapons. On 14 January Company D, 4/3rd found 5 weapons and Company C, 4/3rd engaged 4 VC killing 3. On 16 January Troop B, 123rd Aviation Company in two contacts killed 13 VC. The same day a USAF air strike killed 5 VC. On 17 January a vehicle from 723rd Maintenance Company was ambushed resulting in 2 US killed. On 23 January, Troop B 123rd Aviation Company engaged 8 VC killing all of them. On 25 January Troop B, 123rd Aviation in 3 contacts killed 20 PAVN/VC. That same day Company A, 4/21st triggered a mechanical ambush killing 5 PAVN/VC and an air strike killed a further 5 PAVN. For the period from 21 to 31 January the brigade reported 65 PAVN/VC killed and 6 weapons captured.

On 3 February Troop B, 123rd Aviation killed 12 VC and captured 2 weapons and 2 suspects. On 19 February Troop B, 123rd Aviation engaged 7 PAVN/VC killing all of them. While on a search and clear mission on 21 February Company B, 1/20th detonated a booby trap resulting in 2 US killed. On 22 February Troop D, 1/1st Cavalry killed 13 PAVN/VC. On 28 February Troop D, 1/1st Cavalry and Company B, 1/29th engaged 6 PAVN/VC killing 5 of them.

== Aftermath ==
The operation concluded on 28 February 1971. US losses were 440 killed, PAVN/VC losses were 4589 killed and 137 captured.
