= Firebase Vera =

Site information
- Type: Army
- Condition: abandoned

Location
- Coordinates: 13.713°N 107.617°E

Site history
- Built: October 1968
- In use: October- December 1968
- Battles/wars: Vietnam War

Garrison information
- Occupants: 35th Infantry Regiment

Firebase Vera was a U.S. Army firebase located near the Cambodian border southwest of Pleiku in the central highlands of Vietnam.

== History ==
Vera was constructed in October 1968 by the 1st Battalion, 35th Infantry approximately 6 km from the Cambodian border, 8 km south of Đức Cơ Camp and 50 km southwest of Pleiku.

Vera was assaulted by People's Army of Vietnam (PAVN) sappers under cover of mortar fire on the early morning of 14 November 1968. The assault was repulsed for the loss of six U.S. and six PAVN killed.

Units based at Vera included:

- B Co 3rd Battalion, 8th Infantry
- 1st Battalion, 22nd Infantry
- 2nd Battalion, 9th Artillery
- 1st Battalion, 92nd Artillery

== Current use ==
The base has been turned over to farmland.
