= Tam Soc Base =

Site information
- Type: Army

Location
- Coordinates: 9.564°N 105.825°E

Site history
- Battles/wars: Vietnam War

Garrison information
- Occupants: Army of the Republic of Vietnam

Tam Soc Base was an Army of the Republic of Vietnam (ARVN) base located southwest of Sóc Trăng, Sóc Trăng Province in southern Vietnam.

== History ==
The base was located approximately 14 km southwest of Sóc Trăng.

The base was attacked by a Vietcong unit on the early morning of 24 March 1969. Two U.S. military advisers from Advisory Team 71, Military Assistance Command, Vietnam, were killed in the attack, while a further two, First Lieutenant Richard Bowers and Staff Sergeant Gerasimo Arroyo-Baez were taken prisoner and subsequently died in captivity.

== Current use ==
The base has reverted to housing and farmland.
