= Patrol Base Diamond III =

Site information
- Type: Army Base

Location
- Coordinates: 11.047°N 106.215°E

Site history
- Built: 14 April 1969
- In use: April 1969
- Battles/wars: Vietnam War

Garrison information
- Occupants: 25th Infantry Division

Patrol Base Diamond III (also known as Firebase Diamond III) is a former U.S. Army base southeast of Tây Ninh in southern Vietnam.

== History ==
The base was established on 14 April 1969 by the 2nd Battalion, 27th Infantry Regiment during Operation Toan Thang III 10 km southwest of Go Dau Ha and 2 km east of the Parrot's Beak, Cambodia.

At 03:00 on 15 April 1969 the base was attacked by People's Army of Vietnam (PAVN)/Vietcong (VC) forces. The base was hit by over 350 Rocket-propelled grenades and over 150 82mm mortar rounds followed by a ground attack. Two howitzer sections at the base fired over 350 high-explosive and 12 Beehive rounds while nearby artillery units fired a further 500 high-explosive and 40 Firecracker rounds in support of the base. The attack was repulsed with 198 PAVN/VC killed and eight captured and 40 individual and 42 crew-served weapons captured; U.S. losses were 13 killed.

== Current use ==
The base has reverted to farmland.
