= Landing Zone Virgin =

Former U.S. Army base in Vietnam

Site information
- Type: Army

Location
- Coordinates: 14.451°N 107.721°E

Site history
- Built: 1968
- In use: 1968-9
- Battles/wars: Vietnam War

Garrison information
- Occupants: 2nd Battalion, 35th Infantry Regiment

Landing Zone Virgin is a former U.S. Army base northwest of Kon Tum, in the Central Highlands of Vietnam.

== History ==
The base was established in April/May 1968 by the 2nd Battalion, 35th Infantry Regiment and was located approximately 33 km northwest of Kontum overlooking the northern Plei Trap Valley.

The 2nd Brigade, 4th Infantry Division operated here in April 1969.

== Current use ==
The base is abandoned and has returned to jungle.
