= Xuân Lộc Base Camp =

Xuân Lộc Camp
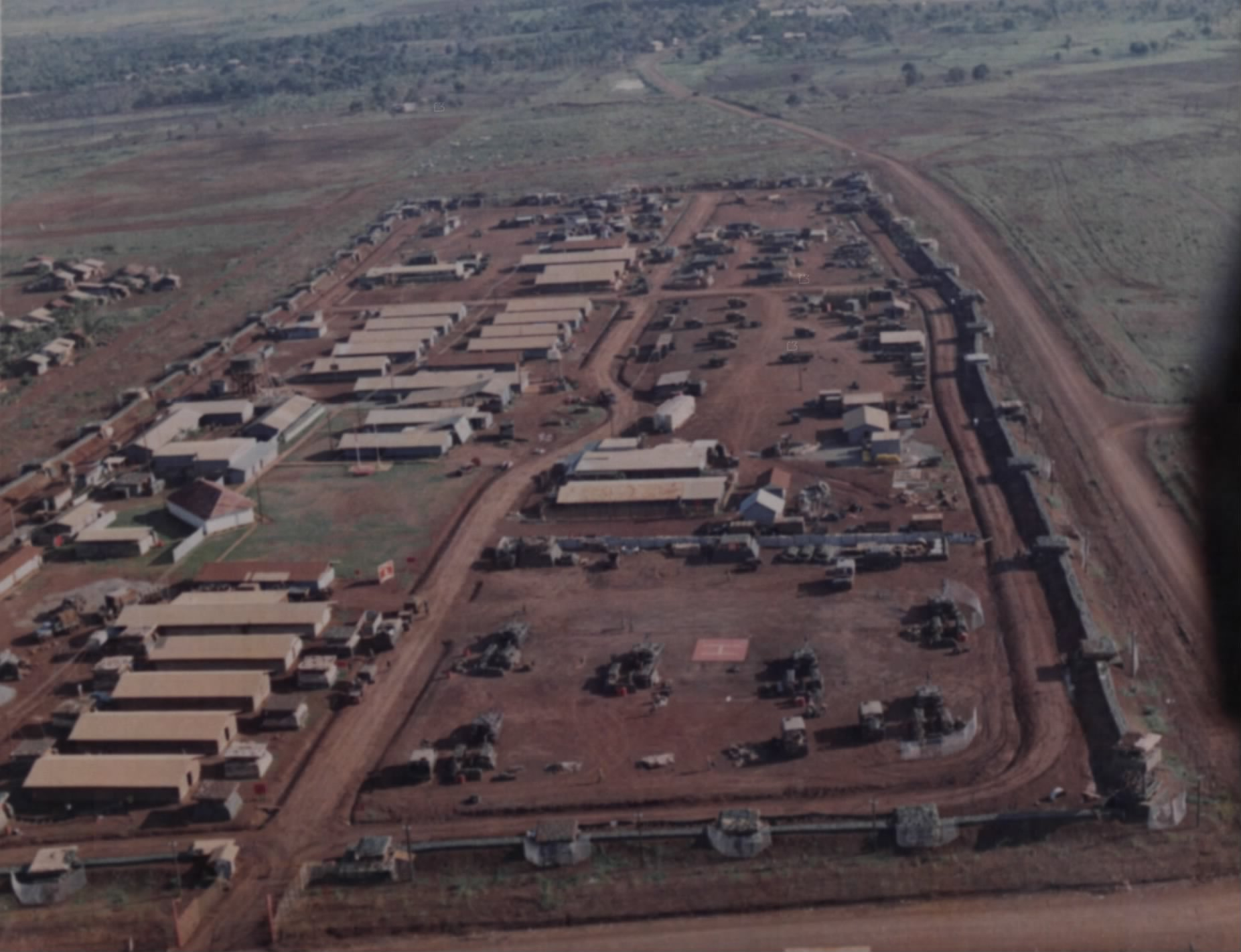
- Xuân Lộc Base Camp, 22 May 1969

Site information
- Type: Army Base

Location
- Coordinates: 10°55′17″N 107°15′20″E

Site history
- Built: 1966
- In use: 1966–75
- Battles/wars: Vietnam War; Battle of Xuân Lộc

Garrison information
- Occupants: 5th Special Forces; 18th Infantry Division

Xuân Lộc Airfield
- IATA: none; ICAO: none

Summary
- Elevation AMSL: 525 ft (160 m)
- Interactive map of Xuân Lộc Airfield

Runways
Direction	Length		Surface
Direction	ft	m	Surface
	3,500	1,067	asphalt

Xuân Lộc Base Camp (also known as Xuân Lộc Airfield or Firebase Husky) is a former U.S. Army and Army of the Republic of Vietnam (ARVN) base in the town of Xuân Lộc in Đồng Nai Province in southern Vietnam.

== History ==
The base was established in late 1966 by the 5th Special Forces Detachment AB-31. The camp was located in Xuân Lộc and 28 km north of Nui Dat.

On 18 May 1969 at 01:00 the 7th Battalion, 9th Artillery Regiment and the 2nd Battalion, 35th Artillery Regiment, 54th Artillery Group at the base were attacked by elements of the Viet Cong (VC) 5th Division. Some VC penetrated the perimeter, but were driven back by the artillerymen. The defenders were supported by helicopter gunships, air strikes and AC-47 Spooky gunships. As the action continued a unit of the 11th Armored Cavalry Regiment arrived and engaged the VC. Fighting continued until 06:00 resulting in 24 VC killed and 14 U.S. killed.

The ARVN 18th Infantry Division had its headquarters here and the base and airfield were at the centre of the Battle of Xuân Lộc in April 1975.

== Current use ==
The base is abandoned and turned over to housing and farmland.
