= Firebase Crook =

US Army firebase in Vietnam (1969)

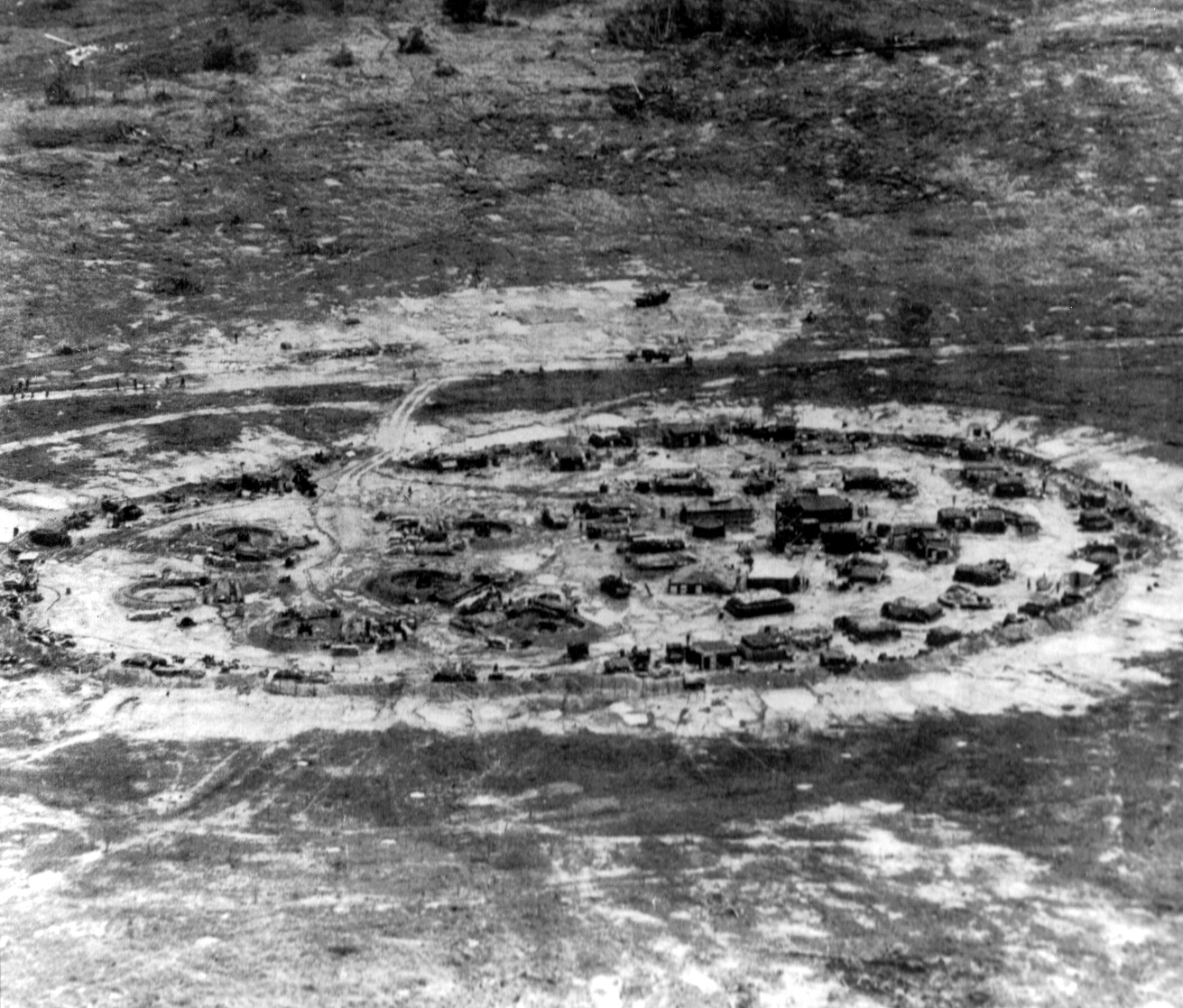
- Firebase Crook in June 1969

Site information
- Type: Army

Location
- Location within Vietnam
- Coordinates: 11.39°N 105.971°E

Site history
- Built: 1969
- In use: 1969
- Battles/wars: Vietnam War

Firebase Crook is a former U.S. Army firebase northwest of Tây Ninh in southwest Vietnam.

== History ==
The firebase was located 18 km northwest of Tây Ninh and approximately 10 km from the Cambodian border.

The base was occupied by the 3rd Battalion, 22nd Infantry Regiment and the 7th Battalion, 11th Field Artillery Regiment in June 1969 when it was attacked by units of the People's Army of Vietnam (PAVN). On the night of 5 June, sensors detected movements outside the base wire. At 03:00 on 6 June PAVN mortar fire hit the base followed by an assault on the southern and eastern perimeters by elements of the PAVN 272nd Regiment with 16 managing to penetrate the perimeter before being forced out. AC-47 Spooky and AC-119 gunships were called in and forced the attackers to retreat.

At 02:00 on 7 June a Night Hawk helicopter detected movement near the base and artillery fire was directed against the suspected PAVN positions. At 03:00 a PAVN rocket and artillery barrage began to hit the base and then at 04:30 2 battalions of the PAVN 88th Regiment attacked the northern perimeter but were forced back by gunship fire. PAVN losses in this attack were 323 killed without loss among U.S. forces.

On the night of 7/8 June a third weak assault was made against the base and quickly repulsed.

United States Air Force forward air controller Major John R. Bode was awarded the Air Force Cross for flying six missions totaling 17 hours coordinating air support in defense of the base.

== Current use ==
The base has reverted to farmland.
