= Firebase St. George =

Site information
- Type: Army
- Condition: abandoned

Location
- Coordinates: 13.688°N 108.08°E

Site history
- Built: 1969
- In use: 1969-70
- Battles/wars: Vietnam War

Garrison information
- Occupants: 4th Infantry Division

Firebase St. George (also known as LZ St. George or LZ Pierson) was a U.S. Army firebase located southeast of Pleiku in the Central Highlands of Vietnam.

== History ==
St. George was located at the intersection of Route 14 (now Route 17) and Route 7B (now Route 25) approximately 20 km southeast of Camp Enari and 33 km southeast of Pleiku.

St. George was occupied by the 1st Battalion, 14th Infantry and 1st Battalion, 9th Artillery when it was assaulted by People's Army of Vietnam (PAVN) sappers on the early morning of 6 November 1969 resulting in 9 U.S. killed.

Other units based at St. George included:

- 10th Cavalry Regiment
- 15th Artillery
- 1st Battalion, 92nd Artillery

== Current use ==
The base has been turned over to housing.
