= Firebase Gela =

Site information
- Type: U.S. Army
- Condition: abandoned

Location
- Coordinates: 11.233°N 106.469°E

Site history
- Built: 1969
- In use: 1969
- Battles/wars: Vietnam War

Garrison information
- Occupants: 1st Infantry Division

Firebase Gela (also known as FSB Ge La) was a U.S. Army firebase located northwest of Lai Khê and southeast of Dầu Tiếng District in southern Vietnam.

== History ==
Gela was constructed in 1969 by the 1st Infantry Division approximately 17 km northwest of Lai Khê.

The base was assaulted by units of the People's Army of Vietnam (PAVN) 7th Infantry Division on the morning of 13 May 1969, the assault was repulsed for the loss of three U.S. and an estimated 39 PAVN soldiers killed.

On 14 September 1969 a shaped charge on the base perimeter accidentally discharged killing eight U.S. soldiers.

Units based at Gela included:

- 1st Battalion, 28th Infantry
- 8th Battalion, 6th Artillery

== Current use ==
The base has reverted to jungle.
