= Tiên Phước Camp =

Site information
- Type: Army Base

Location
- Coordinates: 15.486°N 108.316°E

Site history
- Built: 1966
- In use: 1966-70
- Battles/wars: Vietnam War

Garrison information
- Occupants: 5th Special Forces Group

Tiên Phước Airfield
- IATA: none; ICAO: none

Summary
- Elevation AMSL: 197 ft (60 m)

Runways
Direction	Length		Surface
Direction	ft	m	Surface
	2,000	610	PSP

Tiên Phước Camp (also known as Tiên Phước Special Forces Camp) is a former U.S. Army and Army of the Republic of Vietnam (ARVN) base southwest of Tam Kỳ in central Vietnam.

== History ==
The 5th Special Forces Group Detachment A-102 first established a base here in March 1966 to monitor communist infiltration into the Song Chang Valley.The base was located on QL-585 approximately 20 km southwest of Tam Kỳ and 43 km northwest of Chu Lai.

On the night of 22 February 1969 the People's Army of Vietnam (PAVN) attacked the camp which was defended by the 5th Special Forces Detachment A-102 and CIDG forces. The base was secured the following morning for a loss of 1 U.S. and 54 CIDG killed.

In 1970 the units based at Tiên Phước averaged 50 to 60 PAVN killed each month for a period of 2–3 months.

In October 1970 the base was transferred to the Vietnamese Rangers.

In September 1972 Tiên Phước was attacked by a PAVN force numbering more than 1000 supported by tanks. The town and airfield were defended by more than 3000 ARVN troops.

In May 1974 Tiên Phước was attacked again by the PAVN, reserve forces from the 2nd Division were moved from Quảng Ngãi to Tiên Phước which invited further PAVN attacks in Quảng Ngãi Province resulting in serious losses to both sides.

== Current use ==
The base has been turned over to farmland and jungle.
