= 196th Infantry Brigade (United States) =

196th Infantry Brigade Joint Pacific Multinational Readiness Center (JPMRC)
- Shoulder sleeve insignia
- Active: 24 June 1921–16 February 1946 (various designations); 26 February 1947–1 May 1959 (various designations); 10 September 1965–30 June 1972 (196th Infantry Bge.); 16 October 1999–present
- Country: United States
- Branch: United States Army Reserve
- Role: Combat Training Center
- Part of: United States Army Pacific
- Garrison/HQ: Fort Shafter
- Nicknames: Chargers (special designation); Burning artillery slow-match
- Engagements: World War II; Asiatic-Pacific Theater; Vietnam; Counteroffensive, Phase II; Counteroffensive, Phase Ill; Tet Counteroffensive; Counteroffensive, Phase lV; Counteroffensive, Phase V; Counteroffensive, Phase VI; Tet 69/Counteroffensive; Summer- Fall 1969; Winter- Spring 1970; Sanctuary Counteroffensive; Counteroffensive, Phase VII; Consolidation I; Consolidation II; Cease-Fire
- Decorations: Valorous Unit Award; Army Superior Unit Award; Republic of Vietnam Cross of Gallantry with Palm with three oak leaf clusters

Commanders
- Current commander: Colonel Matthew P. Leclair
- Notable commanders: Joseph C. McDonough; Thomas Tackaberry; Richard T. Knowles; Frederick Kroesen; Frank H. Linnell

Insignia
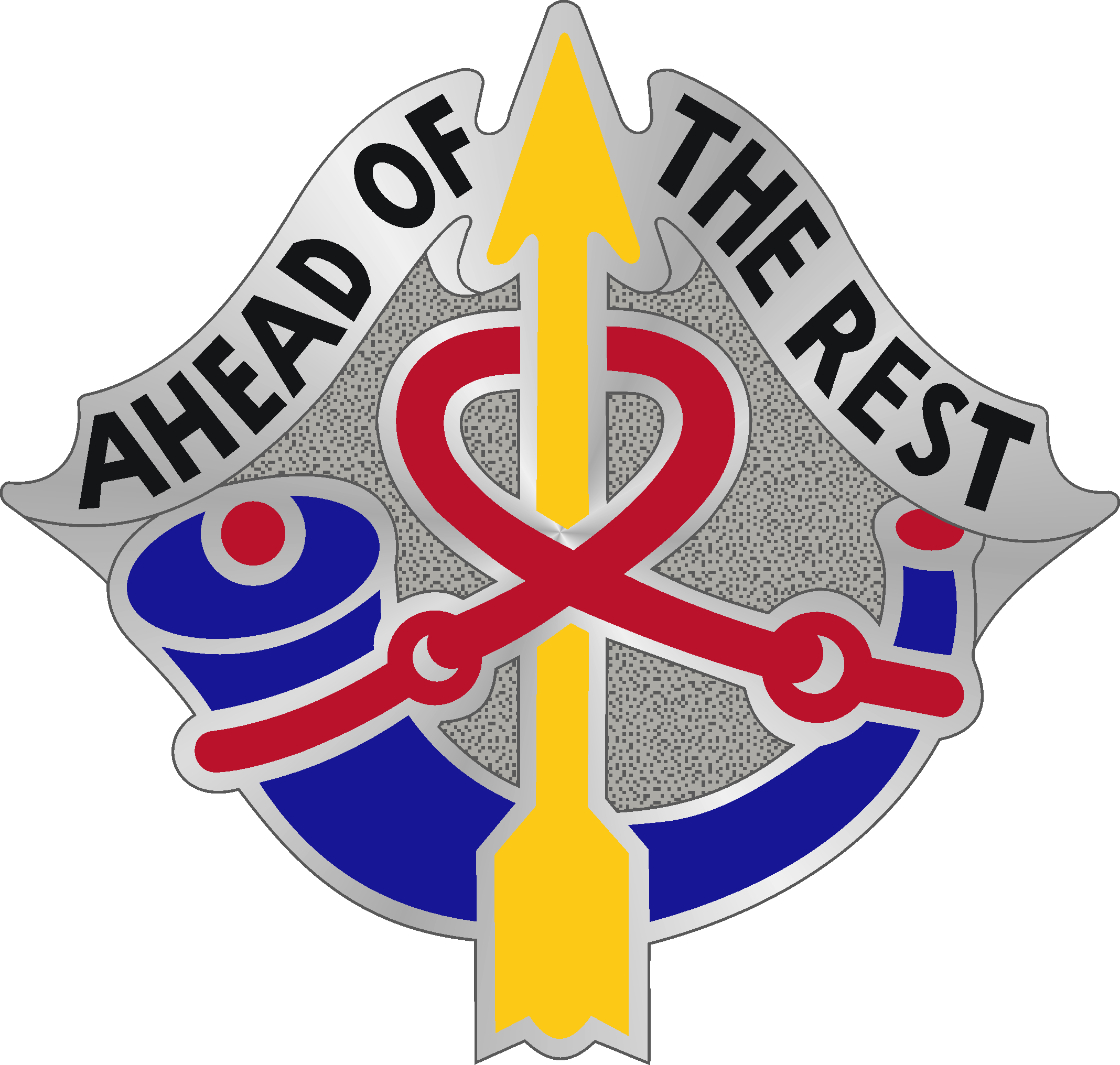
- Distinctive unit insignia

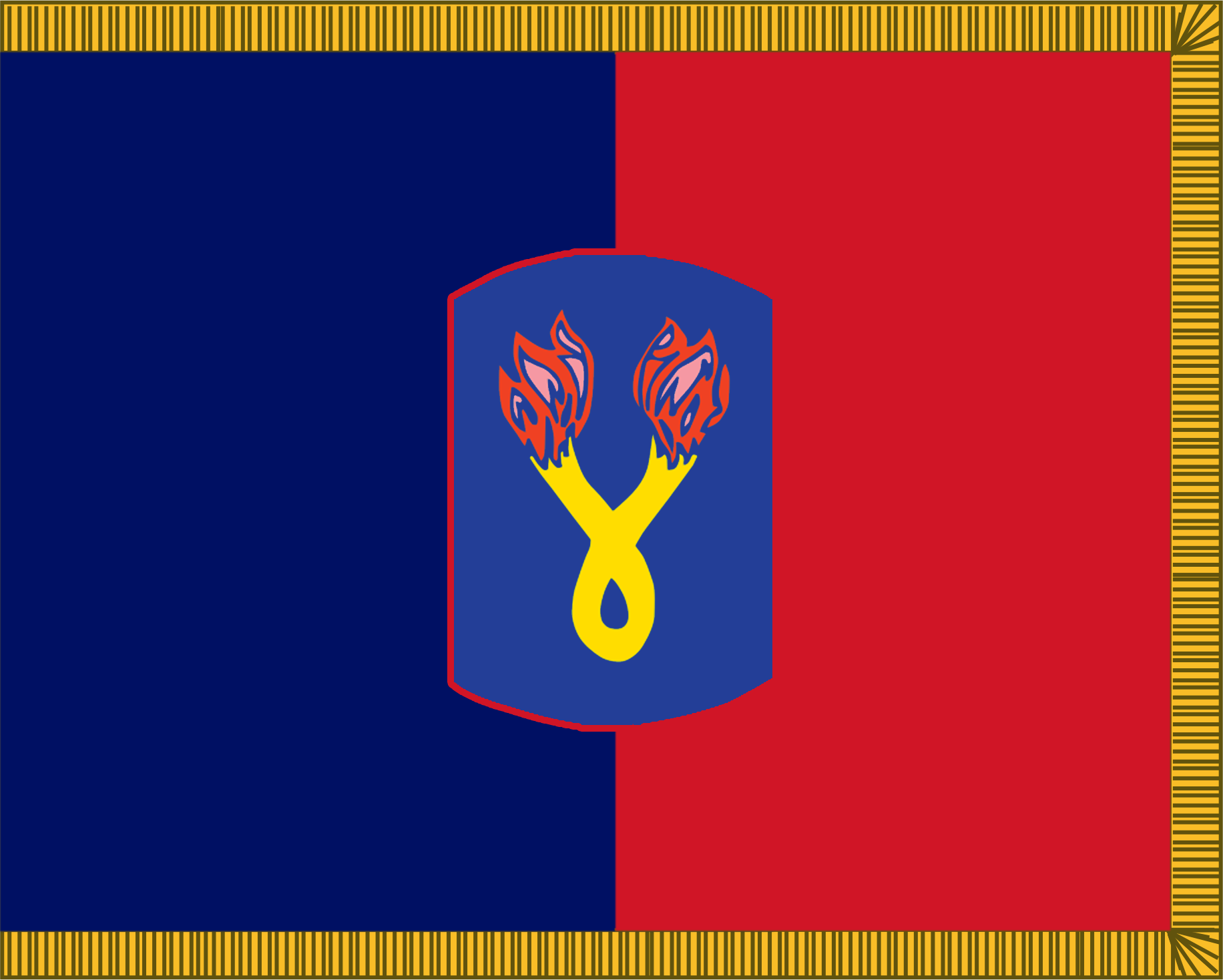
- 196th Infantry Brigade Flag

The 196th Infantry Brigade ("Chargers"), also known as the Charger Brigade, was first formed on 24 June 1921 as part of the United States Army Reserve's 98th Division with the responsibility of training soldiers.

== World War II ==
During World War II, the 98th initially defended Kauai, Hawaii and Maui, Hawaii, and finally responsible for defending Oahu, Hawaii later in the war. The Division began intensive training in May 1945 to prepare for the invasion of Japan, but the war ended before they could depart Hawaii. However, the unit arrived in Japan for occupation duty as the 3rd Platoon, 98th Reconnaissance Troop Mechanized, of the 98th Infantry Division, where it eventually was inactivated on 16 February 1946, in Charlotte, NC.

== Service in the Vietnam War ==
The brigade was reactivated in September 1965 at Fort Devens Massachusetts, where it was originally scheduled to be sent to the Dominican Republic. Instead, the Army rushed it to South Vietnam, the Brigade departing on 15 July 1966 via transport ships and arriving on 14 August 1966 at Tây Ninh Combat Base. It began operations almost immediately in the western area of III Corps Tactical Zone. The brigade conducted Operation Cedar Falls, Gadsden, Lancaster, Junction City, Benton, and Attleboro (in War Zone C of Tay Ninh Province). Attleboro turned into a major action after a large enemy base camp was found on 19 October 1966.

In April 1967, COMUSMACV General William Westmoreland ordered the formation of a division sized Army task force to reinforce American forces in I Corps Tactical Zone. The 196th was selected to form a part of the task force. Task Force Oregon became operational on 20 April 1967, when troops from the 196th landed at Chu Lai Base Area in I Corps. Over the next month, it was joined by the 1st Brigade, 101st Airborne Division and the 3rd Brigade, 25th Infantry Division (later redesignated the 3rd Brigade, 4th Infantry Division). In September 1967 Task Force Oregon was redesignated the 23rd Infantry Division (Americal) and an official change of colors ceremony was held on 26 October 1967. Later, the 1st Brigade, 101st Airborne and the 3rd Brigade, 25th Infantry Division were replaced by the 11th Light Infantry and 198th Brigades.

As part of the 23rd, the 196th participated in Operations Wheeler/Wallowa, Golden Fleece, Fayette Canyon, Frederick Hill, Lamar Plain, Elk Canyon I and Elk Canyon II. In early May 1968, the Brigade's 2nd Battalion, 1st Infantry Regiment was flown in to assist other US forces at the Battle of Kham Duc. On 29 November 1971, the 196th became a separate temporary entity to safeguard this same area of operations. An entire company of the 196th was also involved in opposing the war by famously sitting down on the battlefield.

In April 1971, the 196th moved to Da Nang to assist in port security duties. Units of the brigade were rotated through Phu Bai Combat Base to provide base security. The brigade finally left South Vietnam on 29 June 1972 as the last combat brigade to leave Vietnam. The 196th served in Vietnam from 15 July 1966 through 29 June 1972. The brigade suffered 1,188 killed-in-action, and 5,591 wounded-in-action during its service in Vietnam.

Operations as a separate Brigade (15 July 1966 – 25 September 1967)

- Cedar Falls
- Gadsden
- Lancaster
- Attleboro
- Junction City
- Benton

Operations as a part of the Americal Division (25 September 1967 – June 1972)

- Wheeler/Wallowa
- Golden Fleece
- Fayette Canyon
- Frederick Hill
- Lamar Plain
- Elk Canyon I
- Elk Canyon II

Headquarters locations during the Vietnam War

- Tay Ninh, August 1966 to May 1967
- Chu Lai, June 1967 to October 1967
- Tam Kỳ, November 1967 to March 1968
- Phong Dien, April 1968 to June 1968
- Chu Lai, June 1968 to March 1971
- Da Nang, April 1971 to June 1972

ORDER OF BATTLE

Brigade Infantry & Brigade Artillery

- 2nd Battalion, 1st Infantry
- 3rd Battalion, 21st Infantry
- 1st Battalion, 46th Infantry
- 4th Battalion, 31st Infantry
- 3rd Battalion, 82nd Artillery

Brigade Reconnaissance

- Troop F, 8th Cavalry (Air)
- Troop F, 17th Cavalry (Armored)
- 1st Squadron, 1st Cavalry (Armored)
- 64th Infantry Platoon (Combat Tracker)
- 48th Infantry Platoon (Scout Dog)
- LRRP, 196th Infantry Brigade (later reflagged as Co E, 51st Infantry)

Brigade Support

- 8th Support Battalion
- 175th Engineer Company
- 23rd Military Police Company
- 408th Radio Research Detachment (ASA)
- 635th Military Intelligence Detachment, Team 2
- 544th Military Police Platoon
- 687th Signal Company
- 196th Signal Company (Prov)
- 27th Chemical Detachment
- 10th Public Information Detachment
- HHD & Band, 196th Support Battalion (Prov)
- 569th Military Intelligence Detachment
- Company C, 37th Signal Battalion, 1st Signal Brigade (62nd. Co.)

== Post Vietnam ==
On 26 May 1998, the 196th Infantry Brigade was reactivated during a ceremony at Fort Shafter, Hawaii. The newly reflagged brigade, previously designated as the Training Support Brigade Pacific, is organized as a Training Support Brigade, and is assigned to United States Army Pacific (USARPAC). The 196th Infantry Brigade provides National Defense Authorization Act Title XI pre-mobilization, post-mobilization and demobilization support to Army Reserve Component (RC) units in Alaska, American Samoa, Arizona, the Commonwealth of Mariana Islands (CNMI), Guam, the Hawaiian Islands, Japan and the Republic of Korea. The 196th Infantry Brigade executes its mobilization operations at Mobilization Force Generation Installation (MFGI) Hawaii at Schofield Barracks and at Joint Base Elmendorf-Richardson (JBER), and at three Mobilization Sites, located in Guam, Japan and the Republic of Korea. The Brigade is also designated by USARPAC as the Validation Authority for RC forces mobilized onto Title 10 United States Code, Active Duty. Since 2001, the 196th Infantry Brigade has trained more than 10,000 Soldiers that deployed to support combat operations in Iraq, Afghanistan, Horn of Africa, and the Southern Philippines.

From 1998 to the early 2020s, the 196th Infantry Brigade supported annual USARPAC and United States Indo-Pacific Command (USINDOPACOM) Theater Security Cooperation Program (TSCP) exercises such as Balikatan, Cobra Gold, Yama Sakura, Talisman Saber, Hamel, and Terminal Fury.

The brigade continues to serve as the USARPAC executive agent for Training and Readiness Oversight (TRO) over the Alaska, Guam and Hawaii National Guard Weapons of Mass Destruction (WMD) Civil Support Teams (CSTs), and the Hawaii Army National Guard Chemical, Biological, Radiological, Nuclear and High Explosive (CBRNE) Enhanced Force Package (CERFP).

In 2007, the 196th Infantry Brigade was awarded the Army Superior Unit Award for its support to the War on Terror in preparing RC units and Soldiers for combat duty.

== JPMRC ==
In 2013, USARPAC assigned the Joint Pacific Multinational Readiness Center (JPMRC) to the 196th Infantry Brigade, which serves as the core of an Operations Group (OPSGROUP) for the capability. JPMRC provide enhanced live, virtual, constructive collective training opportunities to USARPAC Battalion Task Forces and Brigade Combat Teams at their home station and at sites throughout the Indo-Pacific.

In 2024, the 196th Infantry Brigade was formally recognized as the U.S. Army's fourth Combat Training Center - the Joint Multinational Readiness Training Center. JPMRC executes rotations for units and leaders in the Theater Army’s complex operating environment designed to replicate combat by stressing every warfighting function and generating readiness in theater.

- Vision - JPMRC is a continuously maturing, agile, and innovative Combat Training Center (CTC) and U.S. Army Pacific's (USARPAC) premier training and readiness capability for Army, Joint, and Multinational forces in the Indo-Pacific Theater
- Purpose - JPMRC supports the Theater Army Campaign plan by building readiness; strengthening partnerships; and enhancing partner capacity and interoperability to prevail in crisis and conflict when called upon
- Mission - JPMRC executes Regional Combat Training Center exercises to build combat-ready Army, Joint, and Multinational forces prepared to fight and win in jungle, archipelagic, littoral, mountainous, high-altitude, and arctic environments

As of 2025, the 196th Infantry Brigade consists of:

- Joint Pacific Multinational Readiness Center, located at Fort Shafter, Oahu, Hawaii
- HQ & HHC, 196th Infantry Brigade, Fort Shafter, Oahu, Hawaii
- 1st Battalion, 196th Infantry Brigade, "Mavericks" located at Fort Shafter, Oahu, Hawaii
- 2nd Battalion, 196th Infantry Brigade, "Nanook" located at Joint Base Elmendorf-Richardson, AK
- 3rd Battalion, 196th Infantry Brigade, "Taga" located at Barrigada, Guam
- Support Battalion, 196th Infantry Brigade, "Cobras" located at Fort Shafter, Oahu, Hawaii

== Medal of Honor ==
The 196th Infantry Brigade has six Medal of Honor Recipients. All six recipients earned their Medal of Honor during the Vietnam War. The Medal of Honor is the United States' highest award for military valor in action.

Recipients of the Medal of Honor include:

- Corporal Michael J. Crescenz; A Company, 4th Battalion, 31st Infantry
  - 20 November 1968
- Specialist 4 Thomas J. McMahon; A Company, 2nd Battalion, 1st Infantry
  - 19 March 1969
- Specialist 5 James McCloughan; C Company, 3rd Battalion, 21st Infantry
  - 13-15 May 1969
- Private First Class Daniel J. Shea; HHC 3rd Battalion, 21st Infantry
  - 14 May 1969
- Specialist Donald Sloat; D Company, 2nd Battalion, 1st Infantry
  - 17 January 1970
- Staff Sergeant Robert C. Murray; B Company, 4th Battalion, 31st Infantry
  - 7 June 1970

== In popular culture ==
The dramatic TV series Tour of Duty, which ran on CBS from 1987 to 1990, depicted a platoon of infantrymen serving in Vietnam from the 196th during the show's first season.

In Season 2, episode 4 of the TV series Prison Break, Theodore "T-Bag" Bagwell pretends to be a soldier from the 196th Brigade to a police officer.

== Notable members ==
- Rocky Bleier, Vietnam War
- Jim Byrnes, Vietnam War
- Richard Chaves, Vietnam War
