= Operation Lamar Plain =

Part of the Vietnam War (1969)

- Part of the Vietnam War
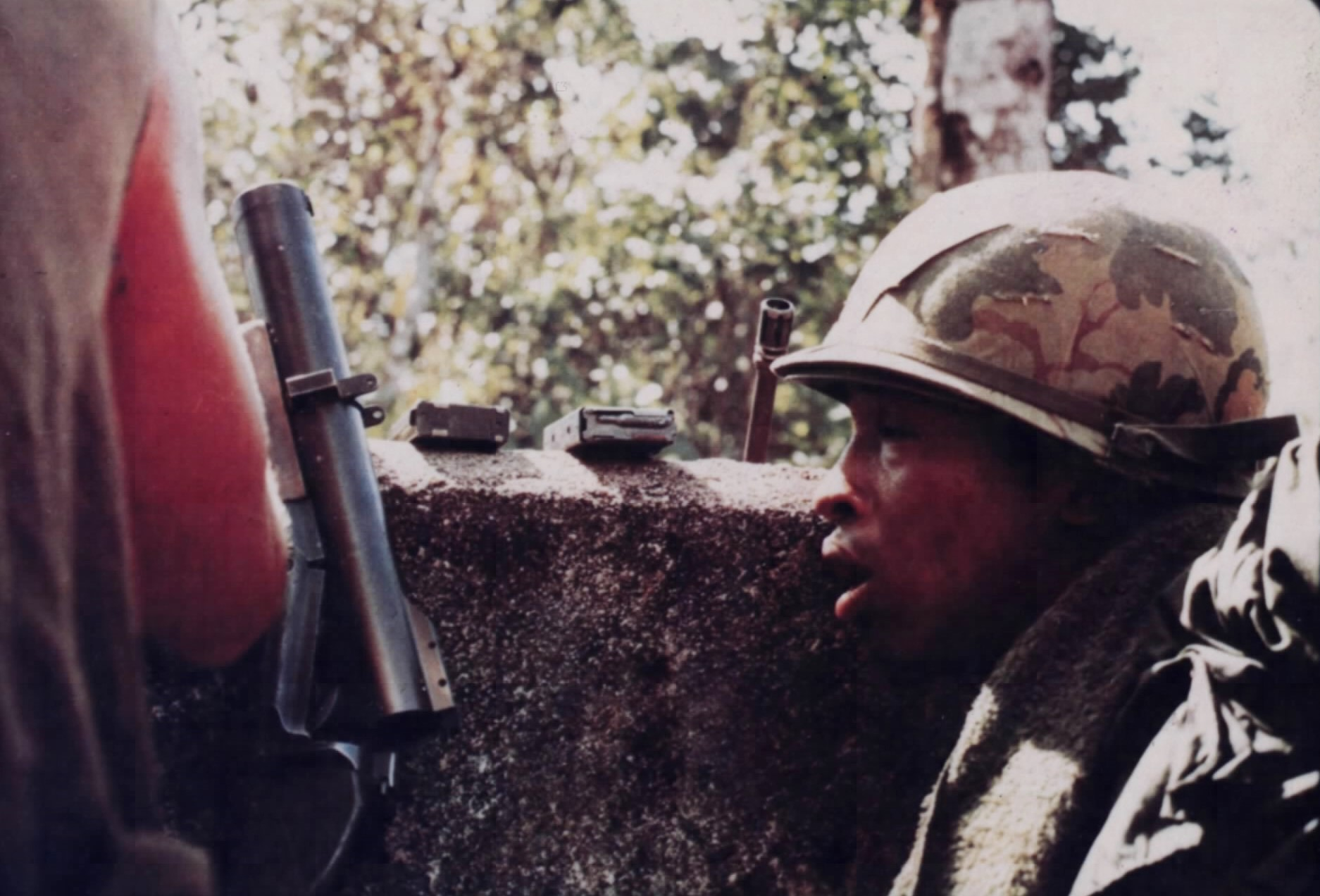
- Company B, 1st Battalion, 501st Infantry soldier shelters behind a stone wall
Date	15 May – 14 August 1969
Location	Quảng Tín Province, South Vietnam
Result	US operational success

Belligerents
United States	North Vietnam; Viet Cong

Units involved
1st Brigade, 101st Airborne Division	2nd Division

Casualties and losses
116 killed 1 missing	US body count: 524 killed 21 captured 256 individual and 62 crew-served weapons recovered

Operation Lamar Plain was a security operation during the Vietnam War in Quảng Tín Province, that took place from 15 May to 14 August 1969.

== Background ==
The 1st Brigade, 101st Airborne Division was placed under the operational control of the 23rd Infantry Division (Americal) to relieve People's Army of Vietnam (PAVN) and Vietcong (VC) pressure on Tam Kỳ. The 1st Brigade conducted extensive airmobile and reconnaissance in force operations with three maneuver battalions, supported by one direct support artillery battalion and one air cavalry troop providing aerial and ground reconnaissance.

== Operation ==
The operation began on 15 May with the 1st Brigade moving from Phu Bai Combat Base to Tam Kỳ.

On 17 May at 17:25 an OH-6 light observation helicopter of Troop B, 2nd Squadron, 17th Cavalry Regiment engaged six to eight PAVN/VC, killing one. Throughout the area of operations support aircraft received PAVN/VC antiaircraft machine gun fire. On 18 May at 07:00 fire from Battery B, 3rd Battalion, 16th Field Artillery Regiment killed six PAVN. At 07:10 Company B, 1st Battalion 501st Infantry Regiment was fired on by a PAVN soldier who was shot and captured. At 11:27 Company C, 1/501st was engaged by PAVN in bunkers, the position was captured that afternoon with six PAVN killed and six weapons captured, US losses were three killed. At 12:40 Company B 1/501st received 82mm mortar fire resulting in four killed. At 16:05 Company C, 1/501st called in artillery fire on four PAVN killing all of them. At 17:35 Troop B, 2/17th Cavalry attacked a PAVN mortar position killing four.

On 19 May at 11:25 an LOH of Company C, 2/17th Cavalry was hit by anti-aircraft fire and crashed. That afternoon Company B, 1st Battalion, 46th Infantry Regiment captured two PAVN. On 20 May at 08:00 the command post of 1/46th Infantry was hit by mortar fire resulting in two killed. At 12:45 scouts from Troop B 2/17th Cavalry directed an airstrike on a PAVN 12.7mm machine gun.

On 21 May at 05:00 Company C, 1/501st detected movement outside their night defensive position and opened fire, a sweep of the area at dawn found two dead PAVN. At 06:42 near grid reference BT 165108 (15.458°N 108.358°E) Company B, 1/501st was hit by small arms and machine gun fire, they were soon joined by Companies C and D and the reconnaissance Company in a daylong fight against PAVN in reinforced concrete bunkers. After finally overrunning the position, 25 PAVN dead were found in the area, while US losses were 12 killed. In March 2014 Santiago J. Erevia who served as a radio-telephone operator with the 1/501st was awarded the Medal of Honor for his actions on 21 May 1969. At 09:00 an LOH observed four VC dead. At 12:10 a medevac helicopter of the 54th Medical Battalion was hit by anti-aircraft fire and crashed near grid reference BT 136128 (15.476°N 108.33°E).

On 22 May at 05:30 Company D, 1/501st killed one PAVN outside their night defensive position. At 06:15 a mortar attack on 1/46th Infantry resulted in two U.S. killed. At 08:35 a UH-1 medevac helicopter of the 54th Medical Battalion was hit by anti-aircraft fire and crashed with no survivors. At 09:25 Company B, 1st Battalion, 502nd Infantry Regiment received small arms fire and responded killing two PAVN. At 09:45 near grid reference BT 132078 (15.431°N 108.327°E) Company C, 1/46th recovered the bodies of 12 US personnel killed during Operation Frederick Hill. At 10:25 Brigade Forward Air Controllers called in an airstrike destroying a 12.7mm machine gun. At 11:00 Company B, 1/502nd received machine gun fire resulting in one U.S. killed. At 13:15 Company B, 1/502nd found the bodies of five PAVN killed by airstrikes the previous day. At 14:07 Company B, 1/501st found one PAVN body. Between 14:55 and 14:57 an LOH and a UH-1 were hit by anti-aircraft fire. At 15:45 Troop B, 2/17th Cavalry killed one VC. At 19:10 Company B, 1/501st engaged two PAVN, killing one. At 20:16 Recon Company 1/501st killed two PAVN.

On 23 May at 11:00 Company B, 1/501st engaged PAVN in bunkers resulting in one PAVN killed. At 11:15 the Recon Company, 1/502nd captured one PAVN and found the body of one VC. At 13:53 Company B, 1/501st received mortar and M79 grenade fire resulting in three U.S. killed. Between 18:55 and 19:25 Company B, 2/17th Cavalry engaged two targets resulting in two PAVN killed. On 24 May at 08:30 a Brigade LOH engaged two VC killing all of them. At 16:15 Company B. 1/501st received small arms fire resulting in one U.S. killed.

On 25 May at 07:20 an LOH was hit by small arms fire and crashed, other air cavalry units moved to the scene and another LOH was hit by ground fire. An airstrike was called in which destroyed a 12.7mm machine gun. At 09:50 another airstrike killed one VC. At 13:09 Recon Company, 1/502nd found two PAVN killed by air strikes. At 14:10 an air observer called artillery fire on five VC, killing three. At 16:20 Company A, 1/501st was hit by small arms fire, they then overran a PAVN 82mm mortar position, killing six PAVN and capturing one. At 18:50 Recon Company, 1/502nd killed one PAVN and found one VC killed earlier. On 26 May at 09:25 Company B, 1/501st received heavy fire resulting in two U.S. killed. At 14:30 and 16:30 two B-52 strikes were directed against the suspected locations of the PAVN 2nd Division headquarters at grid references BT 160101 (15.452°N 108.353°E) and BT 170015 (15.373°N 108.363°E). At 17:25 PAVN sniper fire killed one soldier from Company B, 1/501st.

On 27 May bomb damage assessments were conducted of the B-52 strike areas, at 07:35 Troop B, 2/17th Cavalry observed one PAVN killed in the strike. At 08:40 Company A, 1/46th killed two PAVN. At 10:05 Company D, 1/502nd found four PAVN killed by airstrikes. At 12:25 the Troop B, 2/17th Cavalry aero-rifle platoon was inserted at grid reference BT 185005 (15.366°N 108.378°E) to check the B-52 strike area, they were engaged by a PAVN sniper who they killed, the platoon found extensive damaged bunkers, but no dead. At 14:30 Troop B, 2/17th Cavalry killed one PAVN. At 17:25 Company A, 1/46th called in artillery fire on a PAVN platoon, killing five.

On 28 May at 12:30 Troop B, 2/17th Cavalry killed two PAVN. At 12:50 Recon Company, 1/502nd killed one PAVN at a river crossing. On 29 May at 11:35 Company D, 1/501st found two PAVN killed by airstrikes. At 16:20 Recon Company, 1/46th killed two PAVN. At 17:00 Company A, 1/501st found one PAVN killed by airstrikes. On 30 May despite a 24 hour ceasefire for Buddha's birthday, at 08:15 PAVN fired on a Troop B, 2/17th Cavalry LOH, which returned fire killing two. At 13:55 another LOH was fired on and it returned fire killing one PAVN. That afternoon the Brigade was ordered to prepare for an operation against the VC 1st Main Force Regiment in the Song Tham Valley commencing on 1 June. On 31 May at 10:25 Company D, 1/501st was fired on and it engaged killing six PAVN for two U.S. killed.

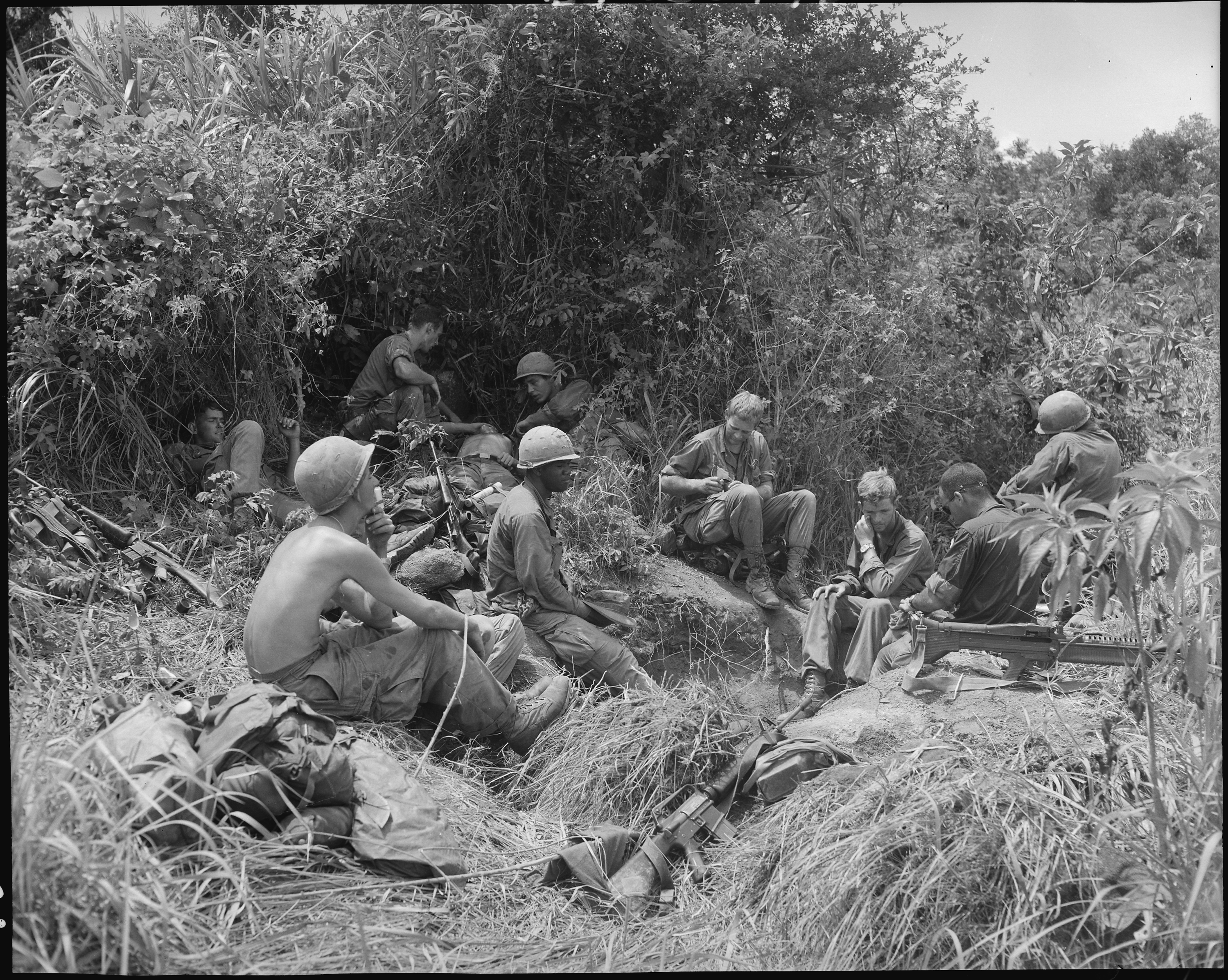
Members of Companies B and D, 1st Battalion, 501st Infantry Regiment take a break, 2 June 1969

On 1 June the PAVN/VC generally avoided contact. The graves of two PAVN were found. The air assault into the Song Tham Valley by 1/502nd was uneventful. At 12:15 Company B 1/501st attacked a bunker killing one VC. On 2 June at 07:40 Company B, 1/502nd captured one PAVN. At 08:55 Troop B, 2/17th Cavalry received ground fire and killed one VC. Graves containing two PAVN/VC were located. At 12:30 the aero-rifle platoon was landed at grid reference BT 210128 (15.477°N 108.4°E) to suppress antiaircraft fire, it came under fire and air and artillery support was called in resulting in one VC killed. At 15:30 Company D, 1/501st found the body of a U.S. soldier killed the previous day, as they prepared to evacuate it a command detonated mine was triggered and they were hit by small arms fire resulting in five U.S. killed. Medic Joseph G. LaPointe Jr. was posthumously awarded the Medal of Honor for his actions during the engagement. On 5 June at 11:10 helicopter gunships of the Division's air cavalry element sighted and engaged 24 PAVN/VC 9 miles (14 km) southeast of Tam Kỳ killing 10. On 6 June the grave of one PAVN was found. At 10:20 1/502nd engaged two PAVN killing one and capturing the other. At 14:50 an aerial observer directed artillery that destroyed a 12.7mm machine gun. At 16:50 Company D, 1/502nd engaged two VC killing one. On 7 June at 08:00 units of the Brigade drew small arms and mortar fire from PAVN/VC in bunkers and hedgegrows 8 miles (13 km) southwest of Tam Kỳ, the troops engaged and remained in contact until 13:20, when the PAVN/VC withdrew leaving seven dead and one crew-served and three individual weapons were captured, U.S. casualties were seven killed.

On 8 June at 03:45 Company A, 1/501st detected movement outside its night defensive position and triggered Claymore mines, causing the VC to respond with RPGs, a search of the perimeter found one dead VC and one weapon. At 12:10 Troop B, 2/17th Cavalry took ground fire and attacked a group of huts supported by artillery, killing four VC. At the same time Company D, 1/501st was hit by fire and responded with unit weapons, artillery and air support, resulting in two PAVN killed for one U.S. missing.

On 9 June heavy fighting took place at Hill 376 as 1/501st engaged PAVN/VC forces there. At 09:00 Company B, 1/46th received sniper fire resulting in two U.S. killed, the Company engaged killing three PAVN. Between 09:35 and 10:35 Troop B, 2/17th Cavalry killed two PAVN/VC. At 11:55 Company D, 1/502nd killed one PAVN. At 11:55 Recon Company, 1/502nd captured a sleeping VC. At 13:00 Company A, 1/501st received mortar fire resulting in one killed. At 13:00 Company D, 1/501st received mortar and small arms fire and engaged a PAVN force killing seven for one U.S. killed. At 14:45 Company C, 1/501st received fire resulting in two killed. At 15:20 Recon Company 1/501st was pinned down by fire, losing two killed. At 16:05 Company C, 1/46th directed artillery fire onto a hut resulting in one PAVN killed.

On 10 June activity around Hill 376 subsided. At 06:20 Recon Company 1/502nd killed three PAVN. The bodies of four PAVN/VC were located. At 16:10 Troop B, 2/17th Cavalry destroyed an 82mm mortar, during this time they took ground fire and called in an airstrike killing two PAVN. At 16:20 Company D, 1/501st directed artillery fire to kill a PAVN sniper. On 11 June small groups of PAVN/VC were engaged around Hill 376 with eight killed. On 12 June Company C, 1/46th engaged several small groups of PAVN/VC killing seven. On 13 June at 08:00 Company B, 1/46th received fire and killed one PAVN. At 10:00 in the same area the Company received mortar fire resulting in three U.S. killed, the Company returned fire killing six PAVN. At 10:45 a helicopter gunship crashed after being hit by ground fire killing one crewman. Company A, 1/502nd killed one PAVN and captured two weapons, Troop B, 2/17th Cavalry killed one PAVN and Company B, 1/502nd engaged a PAVN/VC force losing one dead. At 18:30 a Brigade LOH killed three VC with rocket fire. At 21:30 a PAVN soldier surrendered to Company A, 1/502nd. On 14 June Company B, 1/502nd engaged 10–15 PAVN, capturing one and at 21:05 a mortar attack on Landing Zone Professional killed one U.S.

15 June saw only light contact with one arms cache found and three VC killed. At 13:15 the ARVN 5th Regiment found 10 PAVN dead killed by artillery in the fighting around Hill 376. 16 June saw light contact with only two PAVN killed. On 17 June at 11:40 company A, 1/46th received small arms fire killing one U.S., the unit returned fire and with gunship support killed eight PAVN. A further two PAVN killed in earlier fighting were found. At 18:00 an LOH killed two PAVN with machine gun fire. On 18 June at 12:30 Company D, 1/502nd killed one VC. On 19 June Brigade units killed four VC.

On 21 June activity increased with Troop B, 2/17th Cavalry making numerous sightings and contacts, killing five VC. At 12:05 Company A, 1/502nd engaged five PAVN killing one. In the afternoon a Brigade LOH killed three PAVN/VC in two separate engagements. On 22 June Troop B, 2/17th Cavalry killed two VC in the morning. At 17:30 Company D, 1/502nd found a hospital complex and 10 PAVN graves. At 18:00 a Brigade LOH killed one VC. At 18:17 Company A, 1/46th found three VC graves. On 23 June Company C, 1/502nd lost one killed in a friendly fire incident and found one PAVN grave. On 24 June four PAVN/VC were killed in three separate engagements.

On 25 June Company, C 1/46th found five PAVN graves. At 17:45 a Brigade LOH engaged two PAVN/VC in a bunker killing one. On 26 June two B-52 strikes took place but bomb damage assessment showed little evidence of damage or casualties. On 27 June air assaults were conducted into the site of the B-52 strikes resulting in two PAVN killed and one VC grave located. On 28 June activity increased with four ralliers, three PAVN bodies found, one VC killed and one Kit Carson Scout killed by PAVN/VC fire. On 29 June at 08:35 Company D, 502nd was hit by small arms, machine gun and RPG fire, the unit supported by helicopter gunships engaged killing four PAVN. However, while fleeing the PAVN left two pressure type mines resulting in four U.S. wounded.

On 1 July a unit of the Brigade found two weapons and munitions caches totaling 9.5 tons 28 miles (45 km) southwest of Tam Kỳ. On 5 July at 11:30 Company A, 1/502nd captured one VC. At 12:20 Company D, 1/46th captured four VC and one M-79. On 6 July between 04:40 and 06:49 two B-52 strikes took place, troops were air-assaulted in for bomb damage assessment and six VC and one U.S. soldier were killed in search operations. On 7 July Troop B, 2/17th Cavalry killed one VC.

On 8 July at 08:00 Company C, 1/46th engaged six PAVN, killing one. At 12:10 a Brigade unit was ambushed by an estimated PAVN/VC company 14 miles (23 km) southwest of Tam Kỳ, the troops fought back with small arms and automatic weapons fire and were then supported by a USAF AC-47 Spooky gunship, tactical air strikes and artillery. The PAVN/VC withdrew at 19:00, leaving two dead, U.S. casualties were nine killed. On 9 July at 09:08 Company C, 1/46th killed one PAVN. On 10 July at 10:40 a Brigade LOH killed one PAVN. At 11:10 Company B, 1/502nd captured one PAVN. On 11 July the body of one PAVN was located. On 13 July at 08:00 a Brigade LOH engaged 10 VC killing three with its minigun. That afternoon Company B, 1/50st killed one VC and found the grave of one VC. On 14 July Troop B, 2/17 Cavalry helicopters killed five PAVN. At 10:00 a Brigade LOH called in rocket fire on a group of PAVN killing one. At 10:20 Company B, 1/501st found 10 PAVN graves. At 10:30 Troop B, 2/17th Cavalry killed two VC. On 15 July two PAVN graves were located and a further five PAVN/VC killed.

On 16 July at 14:40 Company B, 1/501st found a PAVN base camp and one dead soldier. At 19:05 Company A, 1/502nd engaged three PAVN, killing one. On 17 July Brigade LOHs killed two PAVN/VC, Company D, 1/501st killed one PAVN. Company B, 2/17th Cavalry killed two VC and Company A, 1/46th found two VC graves. On 18 July Brigade LOHs killed two VC. At 10:30 a Troop B, 2/17th Cavalry LOH was shot down and aero-rifle platoon landed to support its recovery found four individual weapons in the area. At 14:00 Company B, 1/501st found a base and hospital complex with 15 graves. On 19 July helicopter crews killed two PAVN and two VC in three separate engagements. On 20 July in a series of small engagements three PAVN/VC and one U.S. soldier were killed.

On 21 July at 11:30 Company C, 1/46th engaged five PAVN, killing three, Recon Company, 1/46th located two PAVN graves and a Brigade LOH killed one VC. On 22 July Company D, 1/501st found one grave, Company B, 2/17th Cavalry killed one PAVN and Company A, 1/46th observed 60 PAVN and called in artillery strikes killing six. On 23 July Recon Company, 1/46th found one VC grave. On 24 July 1/502nd returned to Hill 376 finding two dead PAVN, Company B, 2/17th Cavalry reported two dead PAVN from an airstrike and Company B, 1/502nd killed two VC in a brief skirmish. On 25 July at 11:00 Company B, 1/46th engaged a PAVN/VC unit capturing seven weapons. At 13:00 Company A, 1/502nd found two VC killed by airstrikes. At 14:03 a Marine F-4C suffered a mechanical failure, the crew ejected and were rescued by Troop B, 2/17th Cavalry. On 26 July Company A, 1/502nd found a PAVN grave, the Provisional Reserve Company, 1/46th killed one PAVN, Company B, 1/502nd killed one PAVN. A Brigade UH-1 was hit by ground fire which forced it to land. At 15:30 Troop B, 2/17th Cavalry killed one PAVN and later that day Brigade units found six dead PAVN.

On 27 July a USAF FAC directed artillery fire onto four VC killing one. On 28 July Brigade reconnaissance teams killed two PAVN/VC outside bunkers and captured two female VC. On 30 July 3 Troop B, 2/17th Cavalry LOHs were damaged by ground fire. At 11:56 the aero-rifle platoon engaged PAVN in bunkers killing five and a later airstrike killed another. At 17:05 Recon Company, 1/502nd fired on 10 VC killing one. On 31 July a large bunker complex was located and searched and 42 Vietnamese were detained, an airstrike destroyed nine bunkers and killed two PAVN.

On 1 August Recon Company, 1/502nd killed one VC, a Brigade LOH killed one VC and Troop B, 2/17th Cavalry killed one VC. A new plan for operations in the Song Than and Song Vang Valleys was formulated with operations to begin the following day. On 2 August two companies from 1/501st air assaulted into the Song Than Valley, at 14:00 Company B, 1/501st was hit by heavy machine gun fire losing five killed. Company A 1/501st found two VC graves and a Brigade LOH killed one VC.

On 3 August Company D, 1/501st killed three VC, Company B, 1/501st found two graves and Company B, 1/502nd killed one PAVN. On 4 August three PAVN/VC were killed in several skirmishes and two graves found. On 5 August helicopter units killed five PAVN/VC and an LOH was forced to crash-land. On 6 August 1/502nd killed three PAVN and Troop B, 2/17th Cavalry found two graves. On 7 August Company A, 1/502nd killed one PAVN, Recon Company, 1/46th captured a VC medic and Company A, 1/502nd found a hut complex and two weapons. At 13:10 a Troop B, 2/17th Cavalry LOH received ground fire and crash-landed, the aero-rifle platoon was inserted to secure the area and found two weapons. At 15:30 Company B, 1/502nd captured two 12.7mm machine guns and found three PAVN graves. A Brigade LOH killed one PAVN. At 17:00 Troop B, 2/17th Cavalry LOH was shot down and the aero-rifle platoon landed and was engaged by three PAVN in a bunker losing two killed, while one PAVN was killed.

On 8 August Company D, 1/501st found five VC bodies killed by artillery fire. On 9 August Company B, 1/502nd found one PAVN grave. Also this day plans were issued to begin the withdrawal of the 1st Brigade by air to Camp Eagle. On 10 August Company A, 1/502nd found one PAVN grave and 1/46th units killed two PAVN/VC in two separate engagements. On 11 August Brigade units began withdrawing from the operational area. A USAF forward air controller directed fire killing one VC. On 12 August Company B, 1/46th engaged four VC capturing one weapon.

== Aftermath ==
The operation terminated on 14 August 1969. US losses were 116 killed and one missing while PAVN losses were 524 killed and 21 captured and 256 individual and 62 crew-served weapons captured.
