= Operation Fayette Canyon =

Part of the Vietnam War (1968)

- Part of the Vietnam War
Date	15 December 1968 – 28 February 1969
Location	Quảng Nam Province, South Vietnam
Result	US operational success

Belligerents
United States	North Vietnam; Viet Cong

Units involved
196th Infantry Brigade	1st Regiment, 2nd Division

Casualties and losses
2 killed 6 missing	US body count: 327 killed 4 captured

Operation Fayette Canyon was a security operation during the Vietnam War in Quảng Nam Province, that took place from 15 December 1968 to 28 February 1969.

== Background ==
The operation was launched by elements of the 196th Infantry Brigade in "Antenna Valley", Hiệp Đức District and in the Nui Mat Rang mountains northwest of Tam Kỳ as a series of reconnaissance in force and search operations to disrupt enemy training and refitting operations, destroy base camps and capture supply caches. The operation was launched to complement the 1st Marine Division's Operation Taylor Common against Base Area 112.

== Operation ==
The operation began on 15 December 1968 with the 2nd Battalion, 1st Infantry Regiment, 4th Battalion, 31st Infantry Regiment and 1st Battalion, 46th Infantry Regiment combat air assaulting to pre-planned locations in the area of operations.

On 18 December in the vicinity of grid reference AT 971411 (15.73°N 108.173°E), Company B, 2/1 Infantry engaged an unknown number of People's Army of Vietnam (PAVN) soldiers with artillery and airstrikes. At 16:05 Company B engaged 3 more PAVN killing them all and capturing an AK-47. At 17:50 Company B found 58 PAVN killed, 8 in fresh graves in the vicinity of grid reference AT 970405 (15.7246°N 108.173°E). Total results of this contact were 61 PAVN killed.

On 19 December Company B returned to the scene of the previous day's contact and found an additional 9 PAVN dead who had been killed by small arms fire. At 12:00 Company C, 2/1 Infantry in the vicinity of grid reference AT 956385 (15.706°N 108.16°E) found a total of 11 PAVN bodies in graves. Two thousands pounds of rice were found in the same area in a small cave. Company A, 26th Engineers found 20 PAVN killed by artillery along with one crew served and two individual weapons and miscellaneous equipment. Prisoners and documents captured in the locations of the contact identified the unit engaged as the 1st Main Force Regiment, 2nd Division.

Also on 19 December, in the vicinity of grid reference AT 990436 (15.753°N 108.19°E), Company C, l/46th Infantry found a PAVN/VC base camp that had recently been used. In the vicinity of grid reference AT 964385 (15.706°N 108.167°E) Company B, 2/1 Infantry found a base camp hospital complete with a surgical ward, recovery ward, and five mess halls and 50 graves containing decomposed bodies. 80 to 90 PAVN bunkers were found and the area had taken heavy hits from airstrikes which resulted in 5 to 10 bunkers destroyed. Sixty bunkers were destroyed that day and the remainder were destroyed the next morning.

On 20 December in the vicinity of grid reference AT 957385 (15.706°N 108.161°E), Company C, 2/1 Infantry found a base camp consisting of 50 to 75 bunkers. Later the same day, 125 more bunkers were found making a total of 200. A large quantity of miscellaneous equipment was found including 1 AK-47 and one dead PAVN soldier.

On 3 January 1969 in the vicinity of grid references BT 345312 (15.644°N 108.523°E), a total of 150 villagers rallied to the 1st CAG Psychological Operations. VC attempted to ambush the ralliers but were unsuccessful and lost 1 killed. The ralliers stated that several VC units moved into the area and were taking all their food.

On 4 January, Company A, 3rd Battalion, 21st Infantry Regiment in the vicinity of grid reference BT 108327 (15.656°N 108.3°E) found and evacuated 1,200 pounds of rice located under the floors of several huts and a further 4,000 pounds of rice at grid reference BT 081304 (15.634°N 108.277°E) later the same day. Also that day the 1/46th Infantry moved from the Fayette Canyon area of operations to the Oregon area of operations.

From 5-11 January, Landing Zone Professional received a total of 39-49 rounds of 60mm and 81/82mm mortar fire. On 11 January, five US soldiers were wounded by one satchel charge.

On 13 January, in the vicinity of grid reference BT 152272 (15.606°N 108.344°E), Company B, 2/1 Infantry found and evacuated 20,000 pounds of rice located within two huts.

On 14 January, LZ Professional received 46 rounds of mixed 60mm and 81/2 mortar and RPG fire. Company B, 1st Battalion, 52nd Infantry Regiment detected an unknown number of VC near the wire on the west side of the perimeter. The VC were engaged and lost 7 killed.

On 15 January, in the vicinity of grid reference BT 149275 (15.609°N 108.34°E), Company B, 3/21 Infantry found 1200 pounds of rice.

== Aftermath ==
The operation terminated on 28 February 1969. US casualties were 2 killed and 6 missing, while PAVN casualties were 327 killed and 4 captured.
