= Battle of Tam Kỳ =

Part of the Vietnam War (1968)

Battle of Tam Ky
- Part of the Vietnam War
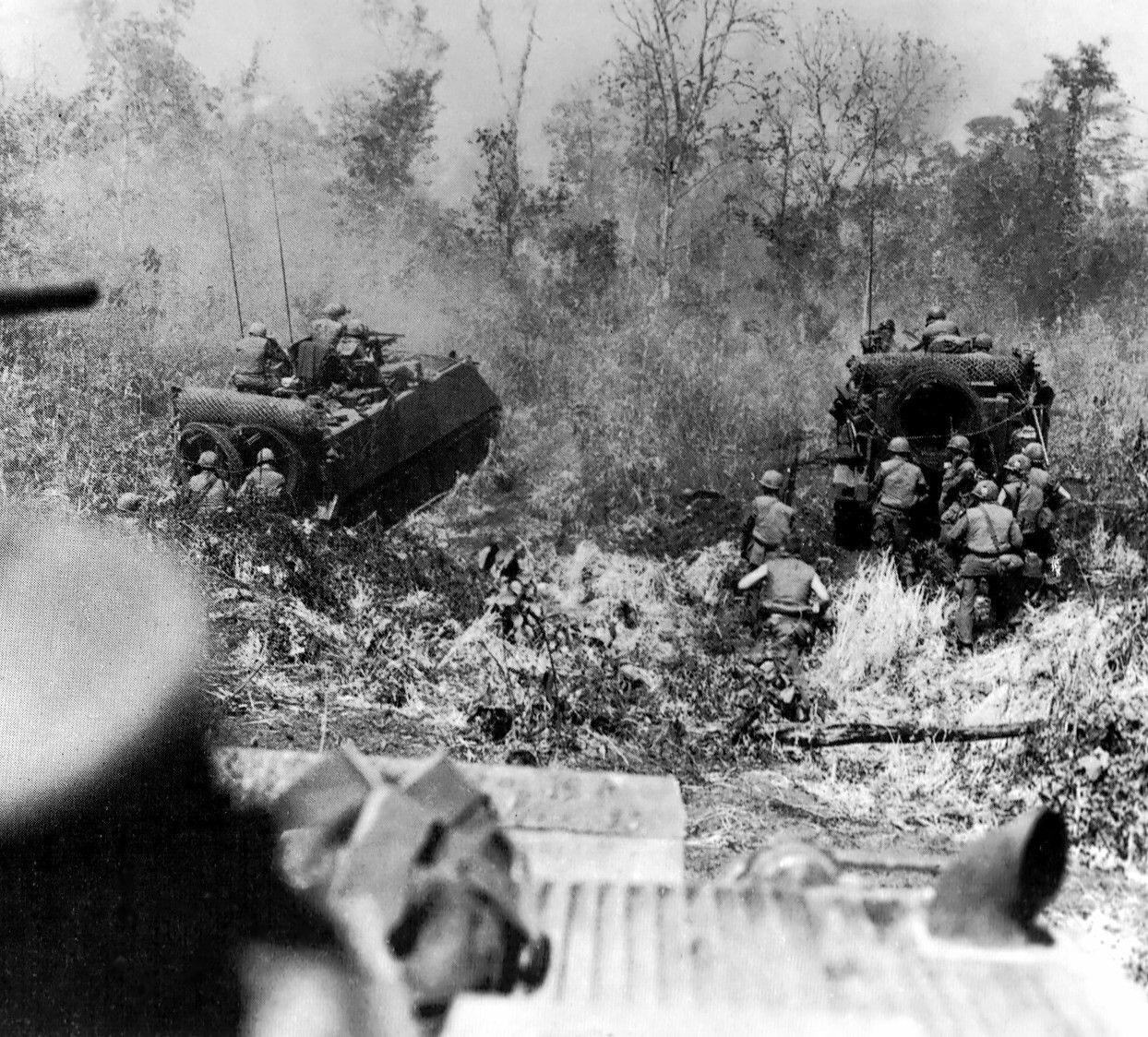
- M113s clear the way for infantry
Date	3–6 March 1968
Location	near Tam Kỳ Base Camp, South Vietnam 10.2364°N 106.374°E
Result	US victory

Belligerents
United States	Viet Cong

Commanders and leaders
Walter C. Cousland	

Units involved
1st Squadron, 1st Cavalry Regiment; 3rd Battalion, 23rd Infantry Regiment	3rd Regiment, 3rd Division

Casualties and losses
	US body count: 436 killed

The Battle of Tam Kỳ took place during the Vietnam War from 3–6 March 1968. After a night-time rocket attack on their base camp by the People’s Army of Vietnam (PAVN) 3rd Regiment, 3rd Division. The 1st Squadron, 1st Cavalry Regiment and Company A, 3rd Battalion, 23rd Infantry Regiment engaged the PAVN killing 436.

== Background ==
In early March 1968 the 23rd Infantry Division was using Lieutenant colonel Walter C. Cousland's 1st Squadron, 1st Cavalry Regiment as a separate maneuver battalion in his own area of operations against the Vietcong (VC) 72nd Local Force Battalion, the 70th Main Force Battalion and the V-13 and V-15 Local Force Companies. On 26 February, they searched a wooded area some 3 km southwest of Tam Kỳ known as the Pineapple Forest, a well-known enemy base area and flushed from cover around 500 VC who had been hiding in a forward staging area, apparently intent on attacking Tam Kỳ at some point in the near future. The cavalry killed an estimated 201 VC over the next three days and thus removed an incipient threat to the Provincial capital.

== Battle ==
On the evening of 3 March 1968, the 1/1st Cavalry was at its base camp at Hawk Hill (15.645°N 108.40°E). The 1st Platoon of Troop A was on Hill 10, securing a sector of Highway 1 and the 2nd Platoon of Troop A was at Tam Kỳ Base Camp prepared to assist in the defense of the Province headquarters. That evening Hawk Hill was hit by a heavy bombardment of 45 122mm rockets and 50 rounds of mortar fire. At first light Troop C, 7th Squadron, 17th Cavalry Regiment, the squadron’s air cavalry troop, discovered the rocket-firing positions on Hill 34 (15.647°N 108.36°E) to the west of the base camp. 23rd Division commander General Samuel W. Koster extended the cavalry's area of operations to the west and attached one company of infantry. The squadron was again to be committed as a maneuver battalion to eliminate the enemy force that had fired on it.

Troop C was ordered to move to the west to link up with Company A, 3rd Battalion, 23rd Infantry Regiment. About that time, 15 PAVN soldiers were sighted in bunkers and the operations officer requested an immediate air strike. At 09:38, Troop C started moving toward the area of contact as the air cavalry discovered more and more enemy positions. Some small arms fire was being received by the aircraft and one UH-1 was hit but continued to fly. A Forward Air Controller arrived on station and asked the air cavalry to mark the target area. Fighters completed the first air strike at 11:00. The linkup of the infantry company and Troop C was completed shortly after noon. The PAVN were defending from well-fortified positions. Throughout the afternoon the cavalry-infantry team tested the PAVN's positions, pulling back periodically to let the fighters strike. Finally, the PAVN began to withdraw, pursued by air strikes and artillery strikes.

At 19:20 Troop C and Company A, 3/21st Infantry, moved to establish a night defensive position on Hill 34. The hill was triangular in shape, with rice paddies and streams on two of its three sides; it was an excellent defensive position. The field of fire over the rice paddies was well suited to the long-range, direct fire weapons on the tanks and armored cavalry assault vehicles. This position guarded the Phu Xuan River, a known infiltration route and prevented the PAVN from using the same firing data against Hawk Hill as was used the previous night. Except for a few rounds which landed about 100 meters outside the perimeter at 22:55 hours, the PAVN, identified as the 3rd Regiment, 3rd Division did not threaten the position overnight. On the morning of 5 March Cousland sent Troop C and Company A back into the area of contact to attack the suspected PAVN positions from the rear. Two air strikes were made on the area shortly after first light, followed by an artillery preparation. After an aerial resupply of ammunition, the cavalry-infantry team moved out with air cavalry elements on either flank. At 13:05 the team received small arms and automatic weapons fire at a range of 50m. This attack soon developed into a heavy fight which lasted until 18:30 when the unit withdrew to its night defensive positions.

On 6 March Cousland committed Troop B, Troop C, Company A, 3/21st Infantry and the air cavalry troop.

== Aftermath ==
The battle resulted in 436 PAVN soldiers killed and many weapons captured.
