= Kern W. Dunagan =

U.S.Army officer and Medal of Honor recipient (1934–1991)

- Medal of Honor
- Born: February 20, 1934; Superior, Arizona, US
- Died: December 27, 1991 (aged 57); Nevada City, California, US
- Burial place: San Francisco National Cemetery; San Francisco, California
- Military career
- Allegiance: United States
- Branch: United States Army
- Rank: Colonel
- Units: Company A, 1st Battalion, 46th Infantry Regiment, 198th Infantry Brigade, Americal Division
- Conflicts: Vietnam War
- Awards: Medal of Honor

Kern Wayne Dunagan (February 20, 1934 – December 27, 1991) was a United States Army officer and a recipient of the United States military's highest decoration—the Medal of Honor—for his actions in the Vietnam War.

== Biography ==
Dunagan joined the Army from Los Angeles, California, and by May 13, 1969, was serving as a captain in Company A, 1st Battalion, 46th Infantry Regiment, Americal Division. During a firefight starting on May 12 and finally ending on May 14, 1969, in Quang Tin Province, South Vietnam, Dunagan showed conspicuous leadership as he organized his men and rescued wounded soldiers despite his own serious wounds.

Dunagan was wounded on two occasions during this ferocious battle, fought four kilometers west of his battalion's firebase at LZ Professional. Still, with his company of soldiers, along with the Reconnaissance Platoon, of Echo Company, 1/46th, commanded by 1Lt David Waltz, they successfully fought off wave after wave from a battalion of People's Army of Vietnam (PAVN) regulars (V-16 Sapper Battalion) in near, hand-to-hand combat conditions. Dunagan was first severely wounded in the face in the early evening of May 13 during a mortar attack. With the lack of line officers in Alpha Company a primary consideration, he refused to be evacuated and thus, separated from his men. Dunagan was the only line officer with Alpha at the time. Echo Company's Waltz was the only other infantry officer present. The Alpha platoons were led by enlisted men.

Throughout the ensuing night of May 13 and morning of May 14, the attack was unrelenting and Dunagan was again seriously wounded for a second time with two gunshot wounds he received while he was rescuing a pinned down recon soldier. Again, he refused to be evacuated. Company C of the 1/46th, commanded by 1Lt Walt Brownlee, maneuvered to within shouting distance of Alpha Company, but two attempts to link the units failed, with many killed and severely wounded in each company. In the end, after losing many of his men during those two days, Dunagan was finally able to maneuver his remaining 42 men by way of a plan struck in the final hours of daylight of May 14, 1969.

Dunagan and the base commander, Lieutenant Colonel G. R. Underhill, decided to have the base artillery units attempt to throw up as much smoke – in as many ways they could muster – to conceal Dunagan and his men as they made their final attempt to escape an extremely aggressive enemy. Had the plan not worked, it was considered doubtful that Dunagan and the men of Company A would have survived the enemy onslaught.

The barrage of incendiary artillery rounds seemed to make the difference as Dunagan and his remaining 42 troops were afforded a blanket of smoke in which to make their way across a wet, soggy, open field to where Charlie Company had formed a perimeter. Charlie Company massed it's M-60 machine guns on either side of the corridor through which Dunagan's men would pass and laid down a withering base of fire as Alpha and Echo-Recon maneuvered through the smoke screen to safety.

Eventually, most of the surviving men made their way back. Yet, not all was secured, as the PAVN battalion was aggressively following the men of Company A. After Dunagan insisted on going back to look for surviving soldiers, he finally located one wounded soldier, Sgt Bob Tullos of Echo-Recon, who had a foot amputated by one of the white phosphorus rounds. Five other men of the team Tullos was with were alive, but stunned, wounded and disoriented. They would be Missing In Action for two days until walking into the perimeter of Bravo Company, 1/46 about three kilometers east of the battle. Placing Tullos on his shoulders, Dunagan made his way back to the Charlie Company perimeter.

Dunagan spent the next weeks of May and June 1969, in Tokyo, Japan with a shattered cheek bone, two broken molars, two gunshot wounds resulting in two broken arm bones, a broken foot and several other cuts and bruises. After surgeries to repair his wounds and recuperation, he was sent stateside to resume his career.

Dunagan was subsequently promoted to major and awarded the Medal of Honor for his actions.

Dunagan reached the rank of colonel before leaving the Army. In 1985, a skin cancer melanoma was found in a mole on Dunagan's neck. The cancer would eventually metastasize in his inner organs and he died in 1991 at age 57 and was buried in San Francisco National Cemetery, San Francisco, California.

== Medal of Honor citation ==
Major Dunagan's official Medal of Honor citation reads:

For conspicuous gallantry and intrepidity in action at the risk of his life above and beyond the call of duty. Maj. (then Capt.) Dunagan distinguished himself during the period May 13 and 14, 1969, while serving as commanding officer, Company A. On May 13, 1969, Maj. Dunagan was leading an attack to relieve pressure on the battalion's forward support base when his company came under intense fire from a well-entrenched enemy battalion. Despite continuous hostile fire from a numerically superior force, Maj. Dunagan repeatedly and fearlessly exposed himself in order to locate enemy positions, direct friendly supporting artillery, and position the men of his company. In the early evening, while directing an element of his unit into perimeter guard, he was seriously wounded during an enemy mortar attack, but he refused to leave the battlefield and continued to supervise the evacuation of dead and wounded and to lead his command in the difficult task of disengaging from an aggressive enemy. In spite of painful wounds and extreme fatigue, Maj. Dunagan risked heavy fire on 2 occasions to rescue critically wounded men. He was again seriously wounded. Undaunted, he continued to display outstanding courage, professional competence, and leadership and successfully extricated his command from its untenable position on the evening of May 14. Having maneuvered his command into contact with an adjacent friendly unit, he learned that a 6-man party from his company was under fire and had not reached the new perimeter. Maj. Dunagan unhesitatingly went back and searched for his men. Finding 1 soldier critically wounded, Maj. Dunagan, ignoring his wounds, lifted the man to his shoulders and carried him to the comparative safety of the friendly perimeter. Before permitting himself to be evacuated, he insured all of his wounded received emergency treatment and were removed from the area. Throughout the engagement, Maj. Dunagan's actions gave great inspiration to his men and were directly responsible for saving the lives of many of his fellow soldiers. Maj. Dunagan's extraordinary heroism above and beyond the call of duty, are in the highest traditions of the U.S. Army and reflect great credit on him, his unit, and the U.S. Army.

== See also ==
- List of Medal of Honor recipients for the Vietnam War
