= 82nd Field Artillery Regiment =

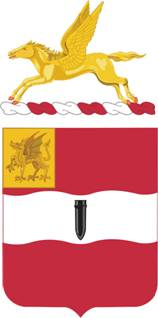
- 82nd Field Artillery coat of arms
- Active: 1917—present
- Country: United States
- Branch: United States Army
- Type: Field artillery
- Part of: 1st Cavalry Division
- Garrison/HQ: Fort Hood, Fort Bliss
- Nickname: Dragons
- Mottos: "Can and Will"
- Colors: Crimson, Obsidian, White
- Engagements: Mexican Border War; Third Battle of Ciudad Juárez; World War II; Pacific War; Korean War; Vietnam War; Persian Gulf War; Operation Joint Forge; War on terrorism; Iraq War; Afghanistan War

Commanders
- Notable commanders: Ernest J. Dawley

Insignia
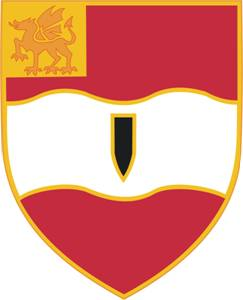
- Distinctive unit insignia

82nd Field Artillery Regiment is a field artillery regiment of the United States Army. The regiment has been involved in American conflicts dating back to the Mexican Civil War, as well as modern operations such as the war on terrorism. There are two active and three inactive battalions in the regiment. Traditionally, the regiment has been aligned with the 1st Cavalry Division at Fort Hood, Texas and Fort Bliss, Texas.

== Vietnam War ==
The 1st Battalion, 82nd Artillery was reactivated on 10 January 1968 and arrived in Vietnam on 24 July 1968 with three 155 mm towed howitzer batteries and one 8-inch self-propelled battery. The 1st Battalion, 82nd Artillery was assigned to the 23rd Infantry Division (Americal) based in Chu Lai, Vietnam. Its assigned batteries were placed at various fire bases located in the Americal Division's area of operations (AO) below Da Nang in Southern I Corps. During its first full year in Vietnam, the battalion's firebases were subject to frequent NVA attacks while supporting a number of operations within the Americal Division's AO. A Battery participated in the July–August 1970 Operation Elk Canyon at Kham Duc where they suffered several casualties. Fifteen unit members were awarded medals for valor in this action including three silver stars. C Battery was located in the Duc Pho area with four guns on the hillside of LZ Liz and two further guns on LZ Thunder, just south west of Duc Pho.

In spring 1971, 1st Battalion, 82nd Artillery was deployed along the Vietnam Demilitarized Zone (DMZ) in support of Operation Lam Son 719, the ARVN invasion of Laos. The battalion made one of the longest nighttime road marches of the Vietnam War, driving 192 miles in only 12 hours. 1st Battalion, 82nd Artillery units manned several critical fire bases right on the border of North Vietnam to support Vietnamese and U.S. forces operating in these areas. At the height of this fighting in a 10-hour period, 1st Battalion, 82nd Artillery guns fired between 7,000 and 9,000 rounds at an NVA Division that was trying to mount an attack against Fire Support Base Vandegrift the battalion's headquarters. During the 69 days of Operation Lam Son 719, the 1st Battalion, four men from the 82nd Artillery were killed and twenty were wounded, with three more fatalities due to non-hostile causes. The battalion returned to the United States at the end of 1971 and was inactivated soon thereafter.

The 3rd Battalion, 82nd Artillery arrived in Vietnam on 15 August 1966 as part of the 196th Light Infantry Brigade from Fort Devens, Massachusetts. The battalion was equipped as a towed 105mm howitzer unit and first operated in the Tây Ninh area of Vietnam, supporting large operations like Attleboro, Cedar Falls, Gadsden, and Junction City. In 1967 the battalion moved to its new Base (AOO) Area Of Operation in Chu Lai. within the southern portion of the I Corps area of responsibility (AOR). The 3rd Battalion, 82nd Artillery continued operations in the Chu Lai and Hiep Duc Valley areas. A Btry. 3rd/82nd supported several operations IE, including Ashaw Valley, Hill 62, and Hill 880.

A Btry. came under intense rocket and mortar attacks in March 1968. The most notable operation was on 11 & 12 May 1968 in the battle of Kham Duc. A Btry. lost a 1 gun chief from mortar fragments and several others badly wounded, including Sgt. John Thomas, 1st section Gun Chief. The 3rd Battalion, 82nd Artillery continued support in the area until April, 1971 when the battalion transitioned north to defend Da Nang and bases south of the DMZ. Due to an enemy sapper attack on LZ East on 11 June 1969, eight members of the 3rd Battalion, 82nd Artillery were killed-in-action (KIA).

The 3rd Battalion, 82nd Artillery participated in many 23rd Infantry Division (Americal) operations, such as Operation Frederick Hill. The battalion's C Battery withstood many sieges by the enemy on LZ Siberia from 1968 to 1969. The 3rd Battalion, 82nd Artillery departed from Vietnam on 29 June 1972 after firing the last fire mission in support of an American patrol operating in Vietnam.

== Persian Gulf War ==
In September 1990, the 1st and 3rd Battalions of the 82nd Field Artillery Regiment deployed to Southwest Asia in support of Operation Desert Shield. Along with other elements of the First Cavalry Division (United States), the helped to create the illusion that the main force of the coalition forces would enter Iraq by coming up the Wadi al-Batin. This feint was part of General Norman Schwarzkopf's Hail Mary plan.

The 4th Battalion, 82d Field Artillery, organic to the 3d Armored Division, deployed from Hanau, Germany as the Direct Support artillery battalion for 2d Brigade. The battalion was equipped with M109A2/3 howitzers and M981 Fire Support Team Vehicles (FISTV). The main body of the battalion arrived in Saudi Arabia on or about 1 January 1991, and remained in theater until 18 May 1991. Upon returning to Germany, the battalion started to inactivate, but was later transferred to Fort Polk, LA where it served as part of the 42d FA Brigade until inactivated in June 1995.

The 2d Battalion, 82d Field Artillery, in support of 3d Armored Division, deployed from Friedberg, Germany as the Direct Support artillery battalion for 3d Brigade. The battalion was equipped with M109A2/3 howitzers and M981 Fire Support Team Vehicles (FISTV). The main body of the battalion arrived in Saudi Arabia on or about 3 January 1991, and remained in theater until 20 May 1991. Upon returning to Germany, the battalion started to inactivate, but returned to Fort Hood, TX under 1st Cavalry Division.

== Global war on terrorism era ==
=== Regiment-wide actions ===
==== Transition to Force XXI ====
The 1st Cavalry Division transitioned to Force XXI following the redeployment to Fort Hood after OIF II. Each brigade of the division gained many assets that were traditionally reserved at the division or echelon above corps level.

Each field artillery battalion gained greater depth in the staff sections of the headquarters, multiple automated battle command systems (ABCS), greater depth in intelligence sections, and a small gain in medical support. The battalions lost organic Forward Observers and their accompanying Bradley Fighting Vehicles. Largely due to restrictions on female soldiers in front-line combat, a tailored Forward Support Company (Golf) was task organized from the brigade support battalion to support the fires battalions. Women were effectively assigned to the battalions for the first time.

=== 1st Battalion ===
In July 2012, 1st Battalion, 82nd Field Artillery Regiment deployed forward to Iraq in support of Operation Enduring Freedom and then to Kuwait in support of Operation Spartan Shield.

==== OAR ====
In 2018, 1st Battalion, 82nd Field Artillery Regiment deployed with the rest of the 1st Armored Brigade Combat Team, 1st Cavalry Division to Toruń, Poland and Germany in support of Operation Atlantic Resolve under the Command of LTC Matthew Dennis and CSM Jonathon Ballard. The Ironhorse Brigade earned the Army Superior Unit Award for its contributions, to include 1-82. Upon redeployment, the Battalion relinquished their mission to the 1st Battalion, 5th Field Artillery Regiment.

=== 2nd Battalion ===
Elements of the 82nd Field Artillery Regiment deployed to Iraq. To support the 2nd Battalion, 5th Cavalry Regiment of the 1st Cavalry Division in the Al Thawra District of Baghdad, C Battery began conducting dismounted foot patrols in an area the soldiers called "Squaretown". From Squaretown, insurgent forces launched mortar attacks and the soldiers were concerned about weapons being transported through the area near the outskirts of Camp War Eagle.

Most of the soldiers of 2-82 Field Artillery were located on Camp Steel Dragon in the Green Zone. Many of the fire supporters were in different camps. The 2-82 Field Artillery fire supporters attached within the Grey Wolf Brigade Combat Team served at 3rd Brigade Headquarters, with Task Force 3-8 Cavalry, and with Task Force 1-9 Cavalry. Task Force 2-7 Cavalry and their fire supporters served with the 39th Brigade Combat Team at Camp Cooke in Taji. The soldiers of C Battery and the COLT Platoon were attached to Colonel Lanza's 5th BCT, located on Camp Falcon on the south side of Baghdad. The rest of the 2-82 Field Artillery soldiers, along with nearly 100 soldiers of B Company, 1-160 Infantry, belonged to Task Force Steel Dragon.

=== 3rd Battalion ===
| Battalion HQ Location | From | To | Commander | Command Sergeant Major |
|---|---|---|---|---|
| Baghdad International Airport | January 2004 | February 2005 | LTC Timothy Vuono | CSM Gary Bess |
| FOB Union III, Baghdad International Zone | October 2006 | February 2008 | LTC Michael A. Tarsa | CSM Calvin Mormon |
| FOB Warrior, Kirkuk | January 2009 | December 2009 | LTC Terry P. Cook | CSM Carlos Sotobonilla |
| Joint Base Balad | May 2011 | November 2011 | LTC Nathan E. Cook II | CSM Carlos Sotobonilla |
| Baghram Airbase | June 2013 | March 2014 | LTC Winston Brooks | CSM Theodore Durand |

==== OIF II ====
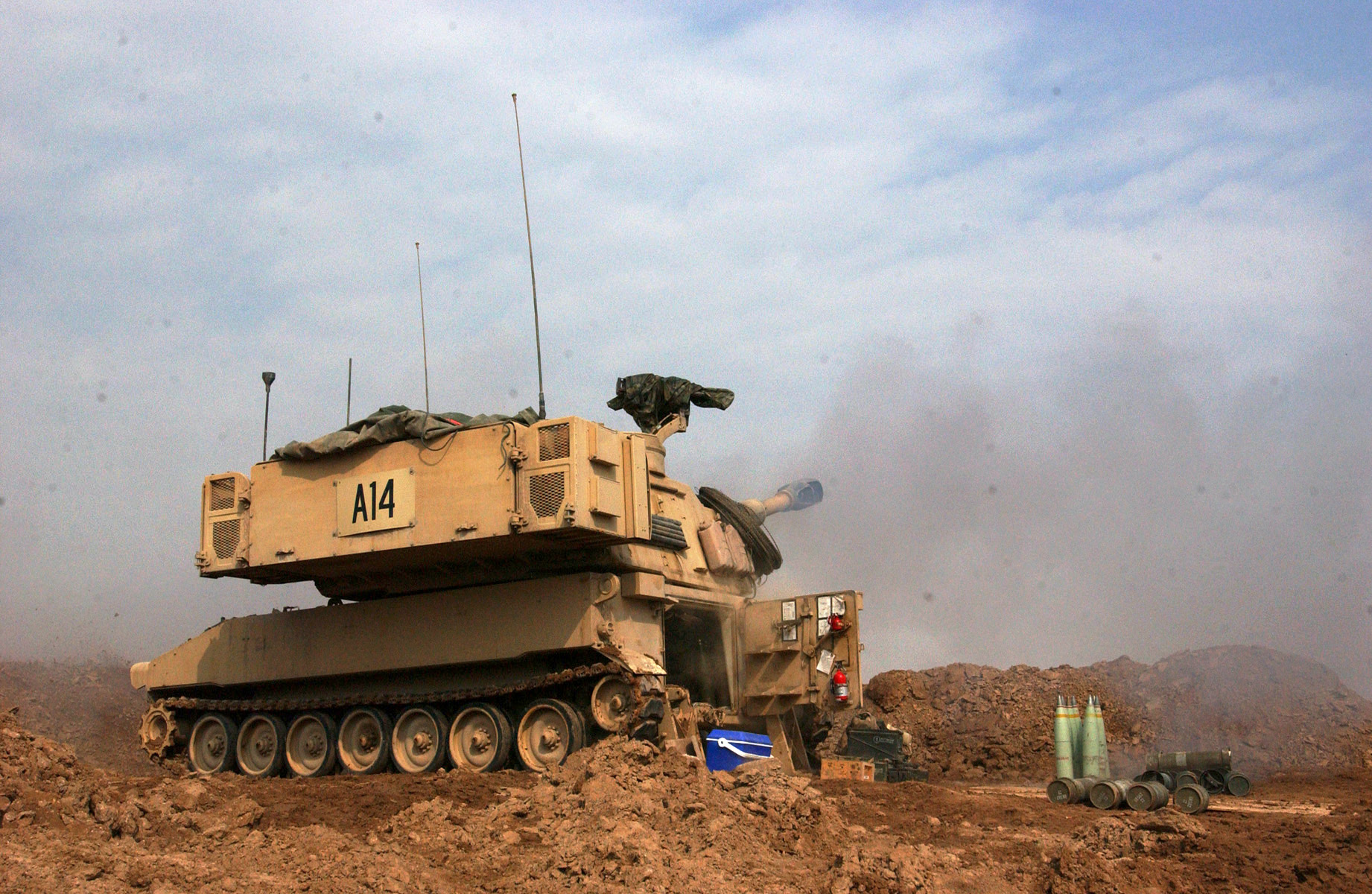
An M109A6 Paladin from A Battery from 3rd Battalion, 82nd Field Artillery Regiment sits ready to fire during the 2nd Battle of Fallujah

A typical day for 3–82 at Thunder involved anywhere from 1 to 2 daytime patrols and 1 to 2 nighttime patrols in its sector. These patrols could have any number of focuses, from checking on projects in sector to searching for new projects to start or gathering intelligence. The main focus in the sector is helping to rebuild the neighborhood and helping the Iraqi Security Forces to take ownership in the areas. They have started two school projects that are approximately $100,000.00 each and several others in smaller amounts.

In October 2003, 3rd Battalion, 82nd Field Artillery formed Fox (F) Battery, a hybrid mechanized/motorized battery composed of 2nd Brigade (Black Jack) fire supporters. The first platoon consisted of six M7A2 Bradley Fire Support Vehicles taken from Task Force 1-5 Cavalry and Task Force 2-12 Cavalry. The second platoon's composition was six M707 Striker HMMWVs belonging to the COLT platoon of D/9 Cavalry. The battery's existence proved to be vital during the Mahdi Army's uprisings in April 2004 with the mechanized platoon filling the gaps in Black Jack's armor shortage. The second platoon ran counter Improvised Explosive Device (IED) and main supply route (MSR) security during that time. Fire supporters from F/3-82 Field Artillery were called upon in August 2004 to go with Task Force 1-5 Cavalry (Black Knights) to retake the southern city of Najaf, with the rest of the battery relieving Task Force 1-5 Cavalry in Area of Operations Black Knight. In November 2004, Fox Battery soldiers were sent with Task Force 1-5 Cavalry and Task Force 2-12 Cavalry to provide outer cordon for operations in Fallujah. The battery then accompanied 3-82 Field Artillery to Forward Operating Base Kalsu in December 2004 to run heavy counter-insurgency operations prior to the January 2005 elections. The COLT platoon is credited for smashing an insurgent operation to kill voters on Election Day, without firing a shot. Fox Battery was inactivated in May 2005, with the entire battery receiving the Combat Action Badge for their efforts.

During the second battle of Fallujah (Operation Phantom Fury), Alpha "Gators" Battery was task organized to the brigade-task force assigned under the 1st Marine Division. Alpha Battery fired over 1,800 155MM, primarily HE but also RAP and Copper Head rounds in support of 1st Marine Division.

==== Operation New Dawn ====
The 3rd Battalion deployed to Joint Base Balad in May 2011. Bravo Battery was tasked with securing the Samarrah mosque in conjunction with U.S. Army Special Forces. Golf Forward Support Company providing weekly logistics support while concurrently patrolling the immediate area surrounding the base in conjunction with the U.S. Air Force.

After the main body of the battalion redeployed to Fort Hood in November 2011, Bravo Battery remained in Kuwait as part of the CENTCOM strategic reserve task organized under 1-8 Cav. The entire battalion was redeployed to Fort Hood by the end of January 2012.

==== Operation Enduring Freedom ====
In June 2013, 3rd Battalion, 82nd Field Artillery Regiment deployed again to Afghanistan for combat and stability operations in Operation Enduring Freedom. The battalion redeployed in its entirety on 1 March 2014 after leading the largest Joint Coalition Task Force in Regional Command East. The battalion provided mission command to almost 2700 soldiers and airmen from the US, Jordanian, Korean, and Czech Republic armies. In June 2014, the battalion activated C battery from within its organization and converted the Forward Support Company (FSC) from Golf Company to Foxtrot Company.

=== 5th Battalion ===
The GWOT saw the continued association of the 82nd Field Artillery Regiment with the 1st Cavalry Division at Fort Hood as well as the 5th Battalion's return of the regiment to Fort Bliss.

=== GWOT deaths ===
| Name | Rank | Location | Battalion | Unit | Date | Circumstances | Age |
|---|---|---|---|---|---|---|---|
| Skipper Soram | SGT | Baghdad, Iraq | 3rd | Bravo | 22 September 2004 | VBIED | 23 |
| Marisol Heredia | SPC | Baghdad, Iraq | 3rd | Golf | 7 September 2007 | Accidental Explosion | 19 |
| Leroy O. Webster | SSG | Kirkuk, Iraq | 3rd | Bravo | 25 April 2009 | Small Arms Fire | 28 |
| Johnny Polk | SFC | Kirkuk, Iraq | 3rd | HHB | 25 July 2009 | Explosion | 39 |
| Christopher Kurth | SGT | Kirkuk, Iraq | 3rd | Golf | 4 June 2009 | Explosion | 23 |

== Transformation and inactivations ==
=== 3rd Battalion ===
On 5 May 2015, 3-82 FA was inactivated and reflagged as 3-16 FA at Fort Hood, Texas.

=== 5th Battalion ===
In October 2013, 5th Battalion was inactivated after a final tour in Afghanistan as part of the 4th Brigade Combat Team. A Battery was reflagged as C Battery 2-82 FA and B Battery was reflagged as C Battery 1-82 FA.
