= Robert C. Murray =

Robert Charles Murray
- Army Medal of Honor
- Born: December 10, 1946; Bronx, New York, US
- Died: June 7, 1970 (aged 23); Hiep Duc District, Republic of Vietnam
- Burial place: Cemetery of the Gate of Heaven, Hawthorne, New York
- Military career
- Allegiance: United States
- Branch: United States Army
- Service years: 1969–1970
- Rank: Staff Sergeant
- Units: Company B, 4th Battalion, 31st Infantry Regiment, 196th Infantry Brigade, 23d Infantry Division
- Conflicts: Vietnam War †
- Awards: Medal of Honor; Purple Heart

Robert Charles Murray (December 10, 1946 – June 7, 1970) was a United States Army soldier and a recipient of the United States military's highest decoration—the Medal of Honor—for his actions in the Vietnam War.

== Biography ==
Murray was born in New York City to James and Frances Murray and grew up in the Bronx. He entered Fordham University Preparatory School in 1960 and graduated with honors in 1964. He then attended Fordham University, graduating summa cum laude in 1968.

Murray was studying at Harvard Business School (MBA 1970 Section F) but left early when was drafted into the U.S. Army. Murray was inducted into the Army in 1969. Given his educational background, Murry could have attended Officer Candidate School but, apparently, chose to serve as an enlisted soldier. He was trained as an Infantryman and graduated from Ranger school. He arrived in Vietnam on November 7, 1969.

By June 7, 1970, he had been promoted to the rank of Staff Sergeant and was serving as a squad leader in Company B, 4th Battalion, 31st Infantry Regiment, 196th Infantry Brigade, 23d Infantry Division. On that day, in Hiep Duc District of the Republic of Vietnam, Murray smothered the blast of a booby trapped grenade with his body, sacrificing his life to protect the soldiers around him.

Murray, aged 23 at his death, was buried in Cemetery of the Gate of Heaven, Hawthorne, New York. His Medal of Honor was presented to his family by Vice President Gerald Ford at Blair House in Washington, D.C. in August 1974.

Murray is one of 18 attendees of Harvard University who received the Medal of Honor.

== Military awards ==
- Combat Infantryman Badge
- Ranger Tab
- Medal of Honor
- Purple Heart
- Good Conduct Medal
- National Defense Service Medal
- Vietnam Service Medal with two campaign stars
- Vietnam Cross of Gallantry with palm
- Republic of Vietnam Campaign Medal

=== Medal of Honor citation ===
Staff Sergeant Murray's official Medal of Honor citation reads:

S/Sgt. Murray distinguished himself while serving as a squad leader with Company B. S/Sgt. Murray's squad was searching for an enemy mortar that had been threatening friendly positions when a member of the squad tripped an enemy grenade rigged as a booby trap. Realizing that he had activated the enemy booby trap, the soldier shouted for everybody to take cover. Instantly assessing the danger to the men of his squad, S/Sgt. Murray unhesitatingly and with complete disregard for his own safety, threw himself on the grenade absorbing the full and fatal impact of the explosion. By his gallant action and self sacrifice, he prevented the death or injury of the other members of his squad. S/Sgt. Murray's extraordinary courage and gallantry, at the cost of his life above and beyond the call of duty, are in keeping with the highest traditions of the military service and reflect great credit on him, his unit, and the U.S. Army.

== See also ==
- List of Medal of Honor recipients
- List of Medal of Honor recipients for the Vietnam War
