= Thomas J. McMahon =

American soldier and Medal of Honor recipient

Thomas Joseph McMahon
- Specialist Four Thomas McMahon
- Born: June 24, 1948; Washington, D.C., US
- Died: March 19, 1969 (aged 20); Quang Tin Province, Republic of Vietnam
- Burial place: Mount Hope Cemetery, Lewiston, Maine
- Military career
- Allegiance: United States
- Branch: United States Army
- Service years: 1967–1969
- Rank: Specialist Four
- Units: Company A, 2nd Battalion, 1st Infantry Regiment, 196th Infantry Brigade, Americal Division
- Conflicts: Vietnam War †
- Awards: Medal of Honor; Purple Heart

Thomas Joseph McMahon (June 24, 1948 – March 19, 1969) was a United States Army soldier and a recipient of the United States military's highest decoration—the Medal of Honor—for his actions in the Vietnam War.

== Biography ==
McMahon joined the Army from Portland, Maine in 1967, and by March 19, 1969, was a Specialist Four serving as a combat medic in Company A, 2nd Battalion, 1st Infantry Regiment, 196th Infantry Brigade, Americal Division. On that day, in Quang Tin Province, Republic of Vietnam, he attempted to rescue three wounded soldiers despite heavy enemy fire. He was able to carry two of the men to safety but was mortally wounded while trying to rescue the third.

McMahon, aged 20 at his death, was buried in Mount Hope Cemetery, Lewiston, Maine. A Lewiston elementary school is currently named in his honor.

== Medal of Honor citation ==
Specialist McMahon's official Medal of Honor citation reads:

For conspicuous gallantry and intrepidity in action at the risk of his life above and beyond the call of duty. Specialist McMahon distinguished himself while serving as medical aid man with Company A. When the lead elements of his company came under heavy fire from well-fortified enemy positions, 3 soldiers fell seriously wounded. Specialist McMahon, with complete disregard for his safety, left his covered position and ran through intense enemy fire to the side of 1 of the wounded, administered first aid and then carried him to safety. He returned through the hail of fire to the side of a second wounded man. Although painfully wounded by an exploding mortar round while returning the wounded man to a secure position, Specialist McMahon refused medical attention and heroically ran back through the heavy enemy fire toward his remaining wounded comrade. He fell mortally wounded before he could rescue the last man. Specialist McMahon's undaunted concern for the welfare of his comrades at the cost of his life are in keeping with the highest traditions of the military service and reflect great credit on himself, his unit, and the U.S. Army.

== See also ==
- List of Medal of Honor recipients for the Vietnam War
