= Tây Ninh Combat Base =

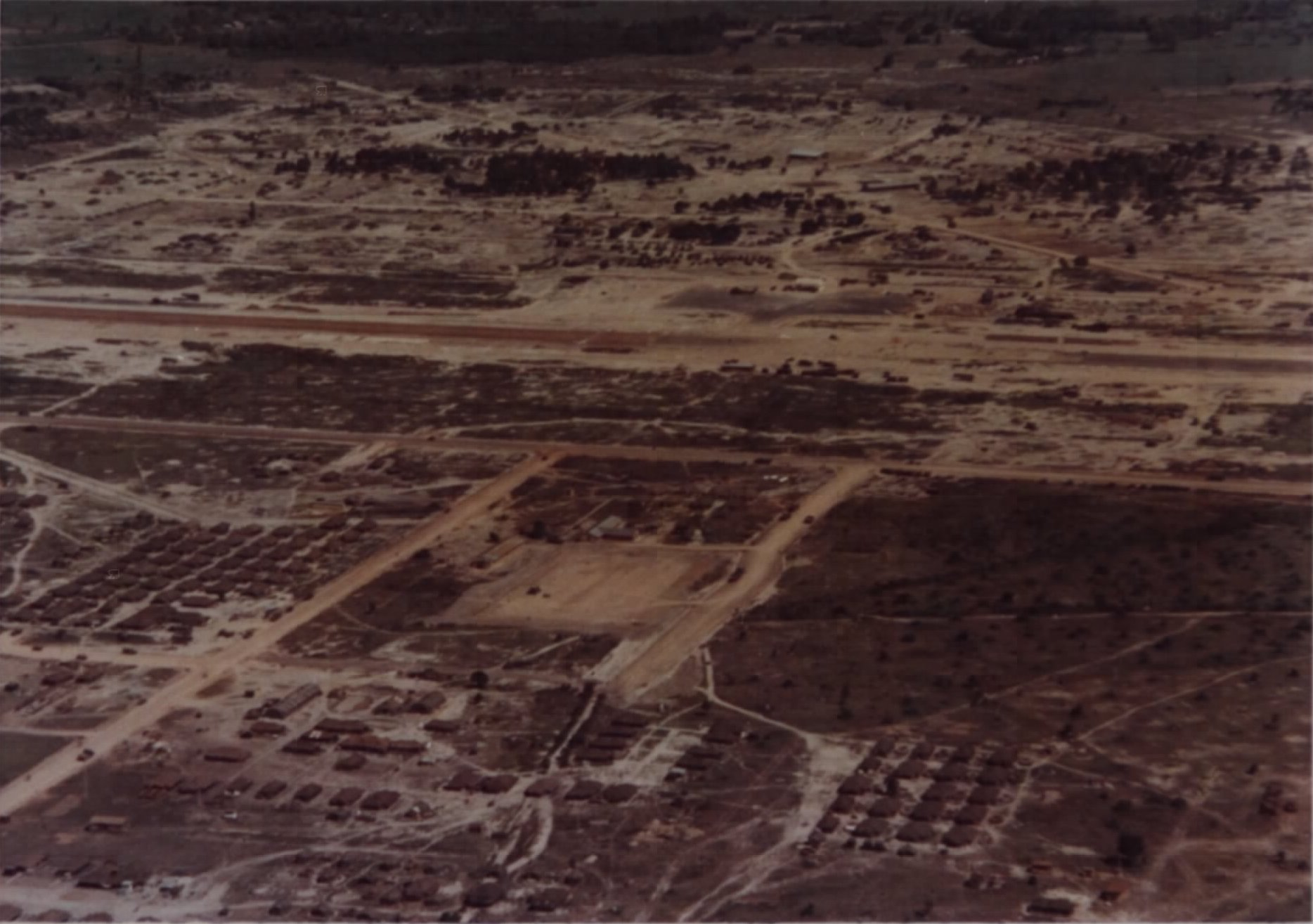
- Tay Ninh Combat Base in 1966, showing the Philippine Civil Action Group cantonment north of the runway and that of the 196th Infantry Brigade south of the runway

Site information
- Type: Army
- Controlled by: People's Army of Vietnam

Location
- Coordinates: 11.325°N 106.05°E

Site history
- Built: 1966
- In use: 1966–present
- Battles/wars: Vietnam War

Garrison information
- Occupants: 196th Light Infantry Brigade; 25th Infantry Division; 1st Brigade, 1st Cavalry

Tây Ninh West Airfield
- IATA: none; ICAO: none

Summary
- Elevation AMSL: 300 ft (91 m)

Runways
Direction	Length		Surface
Direction	ft	m	Surface
	3,800	1,158	asphalt

Tây Ninh Combat Base (also known as Tây Ninh Base Camp and Tây Ninh West) is a former U.S. Army and Army of the Republic of Vietnam (ARVN) and current People's Army of Vietnam (PAVN) base west of Tây Ninh in southern Vietnam.

== History ==
=== 1966–1970 ===
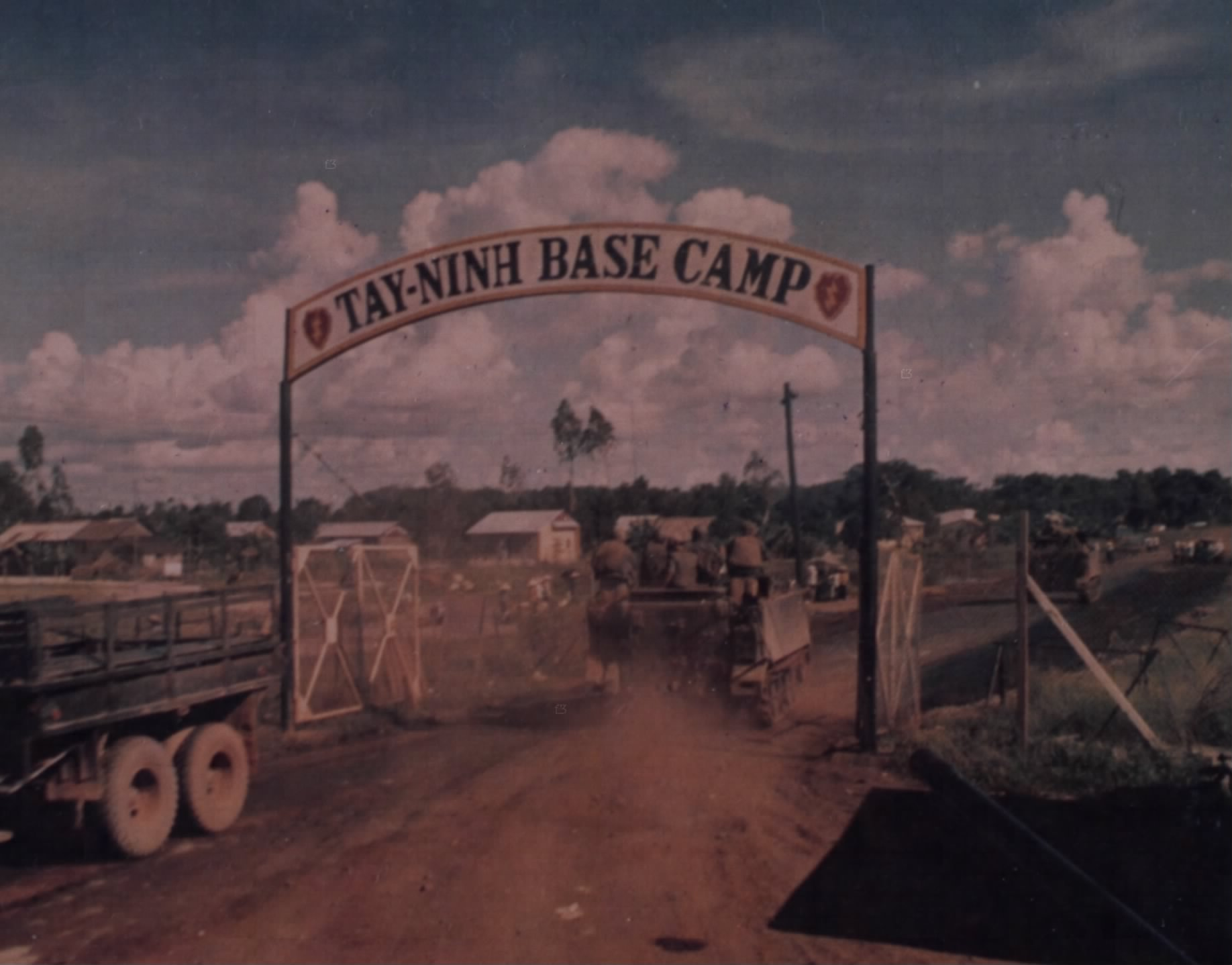
A scout platoon of M113s from the 2nd Battalion, 34th Armor enters the base, 9 August 1970

Tây Ninh Combat Base was established approximately 5 km west of the city of Tây Ninh and 12 km from the Vietnam-Cambodia border.

Tây Ninh served as the base for the 196th Light Infantry Brigade from August 1966 until August 1967.

Other units stationed at Tây Ninh included:

- 7th Battalion, 9th Artillery (August 1969 – April 1970)
- 2nd Battalion, 32nd Artillery (April 1967 – October 1969)
- 3rd Battalion, 82nd Artillery (August 1966 – February 1969)
- 1st Brigade, 25th Infantry Division (March–May 1968, July 1968 – April 1970) comprising:
  - 1st Battalion, 5th Infantry Regiment
  - 4th Battalion, 9th Infantry Regiment
  - 2nd Battalion, 14th Infantry Regiment
- 2nd Brigade, 25th Infantry Division (April 1968, July 1968 – April 1970) comprising:
  - 4th Battalion, 9th Infantry Regiment
  - 2nd Battalion, 14th Infantry Regiment
  - 1st Battalion, 27th Infantry Regiment
- 3rd Brigade, 25th Infantry Division (August 1967 – February 1968, February–April 1970) comprising:
  - 1st Battalion, 14th Infantry Regiment
  - 2nd Battalion, 22nd Infantry Regiment
  - 3rd Battalion, 22nd Infantry Regiment
  - 1st Battalion, 35th Infantry Regiment
  - 2nd Battalion, 35th Infantry Regiment
- 1st Brigade, 1st Cavalry (November 1968 – May 1970) comprising:
  - 1st Battalion, 5th Cavalry
  - 2nd Battalion, 5th Cavalry
  - 2nd Battalion, 7th Cavalry
  - 1st Battalion, 8th Cavalry
  - 2nd Battalion, 8th Cavalry
  - 1st Battalion, 12th Cavalry
  - 2nd Battalion, 12th Cavalry
- 187th Assault Helicopter Company
- 1st Squadron, 9th Cavalry
  - Alpha Troop
- 229th Aviation Battalion
- 588th Engineer Battalion (April 1967 – May 1970)
- 45th Surgical Hospital (October 1966 – October 1970)

The US Air Force 619th Tactical Control Squadron Detachment 7 provided air traffic control from August 1965 until May 1968. 362nd Aviation Support Detachment provided Air Traffic Control from May 1968 through June 1970. On 21 June 1969 after two days of shelling, the PAVN attacked the base and Tây Ninh City but were repulsed, suffering 194 dead for the loss of 10 Americans.

In April 1970 the base was used as a staging area for U.S. units participating in the Cambodian Campaign for attacks west into the Parrot's Beak and north into the Fish Hook.

=== 1970–1975 ===
The base was handed over to the ARVN in September 1970 and was used by the ARVN 25th Division.

On the night of 21 March 1972 PAVN/VC sappers attacked the base killing 13 ARVN, while 16 of the attackers were killed.

== Current use ==
The base remains in use by the PAVN as part of the 7th Military Region.

The airfield is no longer in use but remains clearly visible on satellite images.
