= Operation Gadsden =

Part of the Vietnam War (1967)

- Part of the Vietnam War
Date	2–21 February 1967
Location	Tây Ninh Province, South Vietnam 11.577°N 105.898°E
Result	Inconclusive

Belligerents
United States	North Vietnam

Commanders and leaders
MG Frederick C. Weyand	

Units involved
25th Infantry Division; 196th Infantry Brigade; 3rd Brigade, 4th Infantry Division	271st Regiment

Casualties and losses
29 killed	160 killed (per US)

Operation Gadsden was an operation conducted by the 25th Infantry Division in Tây Ninh Province, lasting from 2 to 21 February 1967.

== Prelude ==
Operation Gadsden was planned as a deception operation ahead of Operation Junction City. The 25th Infantry Division would seek to engage the People's Army of Vietnam (PAVN) 271st Regiment in Base Area 354.

== Operation ==
The operation commenced on 2 February with the 196th Infantry Brigade and the 3rd Brigade, 4th Infantry Division, each reinforced by an additional battalion deploying into western War Zone C. Following B-52 strikes against suspected base areas of the 271st Regiment, the eight infantry battalions seized two abandoned border villages, Lo Go (11.577°N 105.898°E) and Xom Giua, which served as supply depots from the Sihanouk Trail in Cambodia.

Subsequent sweeps confirmed the presence of the PAVN 271st Regiment, 70th Guard Regiment and 680th Training Regiments in the Lo Go area, although they failed to engage them.

== Aftermath ==
Operation Gadsden officially concluded on 21 February, the US claiming that PAVN losses were 160 killed, U.S. losses were 29 killed.

The 196th Infantry Brigade returned to Tây Ninh Combat Base, while the 3rd Brigade, 4th Infantry Division deployed to blocking positions along Highway 22 for Operation Junction City.

Contrasting the official view of the operation, internal reports by the Pentagon Papers indicate that the operation insignificant results, failing to dislodge or drive out the 271st Regiment.
