= Operation Elk Canyon =

Part of the Vietnam War (1970)

- Part of the Vietnam War
Date	12 July – 29 September 1970
Location	Khâm Đức, Quảng Tín Province (now Quảng Nam Province), South Vietnam 15°26′17.50″N 107°47′48.85″E
Result	Inconclusive

Belligerents
United States	North Vietnam

Units involved
196th Infantry Brigade	

Casualties and losses
6 killed in action 31 killed in CH-47 crash	US body count: 107 killed 1 captured

Operation Elk Canyon was a search and clear operation during the Vietnam War near Khâm Đức, Quảng Tín Province, that took place from 12 July to 29 September 1970.

== Background ==
Since the loss of Khâm Đức to the People's Army of Vietnam (PAVN) during the Battle of Kham Duc from 10 to 12 May 1968, the PAVN had used the area as a base for operations in Quảng Tín Province. It was decided that US forces should sweep the area to disrupt the PAVN logistics buildup and forestall a PAVN offensive in the autumn and winter.

== Operation ==
On 12 July 1970 elements of the 196th Infantry Brigade launched the operation by securing Khâm Đức airfield. After securing the airfield and establishing a firebase for A Battery, 1st Battalion, 82nd Artillery there, the 196th Infantry proceeded to patrol the surrounding area meeting limited opposition, while suffering several casualties in small skirmishes and mortar attacks. While they occupied Khâm Đức U.S. forces conducted searches for the remains of the Americans missing in the battle two years earlier.

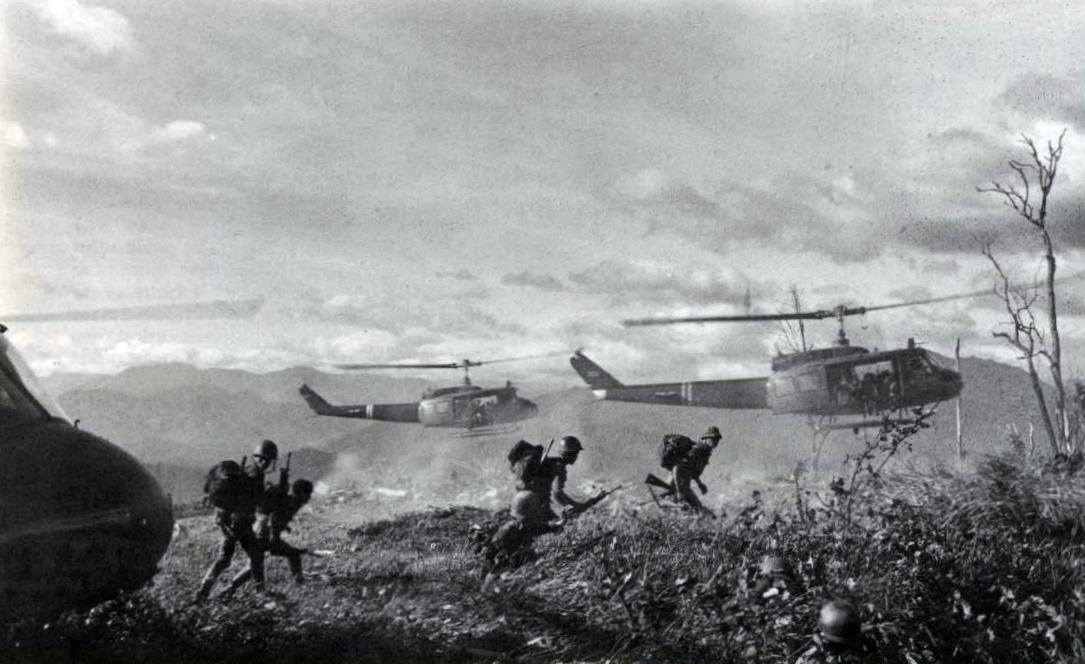
ARVN troops at LZ Kala, 12 July 1970.

The operation concluded on 26 August with the US forces evacuated by helicopter to Landing Zone Judy (15.37°N 108.08°E), 32km to the southeast. As one of the CH-47s (#67-18445) carrying personnel and munitions came in for landing at Judy it was hit by PAVN fire and crashed in flames killing 30 onboard and 1 soldier on the ground.

Operation Elk Canyon II began on 26 August and continued until 19 September. Its objective was to disrupt the PAVN's Dak Rose supply route.

== Aftermath ==
US losses were 37 killed while PAVN losses were 107 killed and 1 captured.
