= CBRNE Enhanced Response Force Package =

United States National Guard initiative

Members of the Oregon National Guard conducting decontamination operations as part of a training exercise in 2014

CBRNE Enhanced Response Force Packages (CERFP) are an initiative of the United States National Guard designed to integrate existing national guard units into the broader federal and local civilian emergency response personnel in instances of chemical, biological, radiological, nuclear and explosive (CBRNE) disasters. The creation of CERFPs by the US Congress in 2004, initially provided for the creation of 12 teams corresponding to the 10 region designations of the Federal Emergency Management Agency, and two teams for regions three and nine, on the US east and west coasts respectively. This was later expanded in 2006 for a total of 17 teams nationwide.

A CERFP consists of four to five elements:

- Command and control, which directs the overall mission and reports to the incident commander
- Search and rescue or extraction, which conducts rescue operations and the stabilization of damaged structures
- Decontamination, which conducts mass casualty decontamination
- Medical, which provides triage and medical support for victims and military personnel
- Fatalities search and recovery, which recovers human remains

CERFPs have an expected response time of between six and 12 hours. They may consist of 200 or more personnel, who are trained to civilian standards set forth by the Occupational Safety and Health Administration and the National Fire Protection Association.

== See also ==
- Emergency management
- Disaster response
