= Operation Frederick Hill =

Part of the Vietnam War (1969–1971)

- Part of the Vietnam War
Date	18 March 1969 – 28 February 1971
Location	Quang Tin Province (now Quang Nam Province), South Vietnam
Result	US operational success

Belligerents
United States	North Vietnam

Units involved
196th Light Infantry Brigade	2nd Division

Casualties and losses
572 killed	7,514 killed 133 captured

Operation Frederick Hill was a security operation during the Vietnam War in Quang Tin Province, that took place from 18 March 1969 to 28 February 1971.

== Background ==
The operation was conducted by the 196th Light Infantry Brigade, 23rd Infantry Division in cooperation and coordination with the Army of the Republic of Vietnam (ARVN) 5th Regiment to secure pacification operations near the coastal areas and the destruction of People's Army of Vietnam (PAVN) and Vietcong (VC) units operating in the area.

== Operation ==
=== 1969 ===
On 31 March at 15:00, troops from the Brigade's armored cavalry squadron engaged PAVN/VC soldiers 9 miles (14 km) north northwest of Tam Kỳ. The PAVN/VC withdrew leaving 10 dead and 1 weapon.

On 7 May an element of the brigade found two weapons caches totaling 4.5 tons 16 miles (26 km) southwest of Tam Kỳ. At 01:24 on 12 May a PAVN/VC force attacked a brigade night defensive position 8 miles (13 km) south of Hoi An, the attack was repulsed and 36 PAVN/VC killed and 11 individual and 7 crew-served weapons were captured, US losses were 4 killed. On 12 May while sweeping a landing zone 13 miles (21 km) southwest of Tam Kỳ, US forces discovered 20 PAVN/VC bodies and 11 individual and 2 crew-served weapons. On 13 May at 19:00 a brigade night defensive position 12 miles (19 km) southwest of Tam Kỳ was attacked by PAVN/VC, the attack was repulsed and 22 PAVN/VC were killed. On 14 May at 06:45 a PAVN/VC force attacked a brigade element 9 miles (14 km) southwest of Tam Kỳ, the contact continued until 13:00, US losses were 1 killed. On 15 May at 02:00 PAVN/VC attacked a brigade night defensive position 4 miles (6.4 km) southeast of Tam Kỳ, the assault continued until 07:00 following which five PAVN/VC bodies were found. At 09:50 a further 10 PAVN/VC were engaged and killed around the perimeter and at 10:15 a further 17 bodies were found together with 3 individual and 1 crew-served weapon, US losses were five killed. On 16 May a brigade unit discovered the bodies of 25 PAVN/VC 11 miles (18 km) southwest of Tam Kỳ they had apparently been killed by artillery and airstrikes. At 16:50, armored cavalry discovered the bodies of a further 16 PAVN 4 miles (6.4 km) southwest of Tam Kỳ, also killed by artillery and airstrikes. The dead were identified as being from the PAVN 2nd Division.

On 10 June at 16:15 brigade units engaged a PAVN/VC force 13 miles (21 km) west of Tam Kỳ, 1 PAVN/VC was killed in the brief engagement and then the bodies of 10 other PAVN/VC killed by an air strike the previous day were found. On 11 June at 02:20 the PAVN/VC attacked a brigade fire support base using a flamethrower, hand grenades, Rocket-propelled grenades (RPG), satchel charges, and small-arms fi and automatic weapons fire. About 30 PAVN/VC penetrated the perimeter, and close-in fighting ensued while they were either killed or driven out of the perimeter. During the action, a USAF AC-47 Spooky gunship and helicopter gunships supported the base. PAVN/VC losses were 27 killed, 1 flamethrower and 12 individual weapons were captured, US losses were 14 killed.

On 14 July at 14:15 an aerial observer reconnoitering for the brigade sighted 10 PAVN/VC 4 miles (6.4 km) southeast of Hoi An and directed tactical air strikes onto the location, killing all 10. On 17 July at 08:00 a Combined Action Platoon received small-arms fire from an estimated two PAVN/VC squads 5 miles (8.0 km) north of Tam Kỳ; they fought back with unit weapons and directed artillery fire onto the enemy location. The PAVN/VC withdrew leaving 13 dead and 5 individual weapons. On 23 July at 07:30 brigade infantry engaged in a short small-arms fire with a PAVN/VC force 13 miles (21 km) west northwest of Tam Kỳ. The PAVN/VC withdrew, and the troopers continued to sweep, and made contact two hours later, in the same general area, killing 7 PAVN/VC.

On 4 August at 17:15 a brigade unit received small-arms fire 14 miles (23 km) northwest of Tam Kỳ, they fired back and the PAVN/VC withdrew leaving 6 dead. On 10 August at 07:30 7 miles (11 km) southeast of An Hoa Combat Base a brigade unit engaged an estimated PAVN/VC platoon, killing 5, US losses were 1 killed. That same day at 10:15 12 miles (19 km) northwest of Tam Kỳ, a brigade air cavalry element supported by helicopter gunships engaged an estimated PAVN/VC company, the PAVN/VC withdrew leaving 20 dead, and ten weapons (one crew-served). On 12 August at 02:10 PAVN/VC attacked a brigade night defensive position 19 miles (31 km) west of Tam Kỳ with 82 mm mortar fire followed by a ground attack. The unit fought back with small arms and automatic weapons and artillery support. The PAVN/VC withdrew at daylight, leaving 50 dead and 2 PAVN/VC were captured. At 02:45 on 12 August a brigade fire support base 6 miles (9.7 km) northwest of Tam Kỳ was attacked by PAVN/VC who penetrated the perimeter but were repulsed by the defenders. US losses were 12 killed while only 1 PAVN/VC body was found.

On 8 September at 10:50 a brigade unit received rocket-propelled grenade fire and fire from a command-detonated mine from an unknown number of PAVN/VC while operating 4 miles (6.4 km) west of Tam Kỳ, the troopers returned fire supported by artillery fire. US losses were 2 killed. At 14:00 on the same day a brigade unit 14 miles (23 km) north northwest of Tam Kỳ received small-arms fire from an estimated PAVN/VC squad, the troops returned fire and were supported by artillery and the PAVN/VC disengaged. On 9 September at 18:00 a brigade unit operating 10 miles (16 km) southwest of Tam Kỳ received small-arms fire, a search of the area found a weapons cache containing 8 individual and 2 crew-served weapons. At 19:15 that evening a brigade unit received rocket-propelled grenade fire 4 miles (6.4 km) west of Tam Kỳ, US losses were 1 killed. On 17 September a brigade unit found a mass grave containing the bodies of 17 PAVN/VC 24 miles (39 km) west of Tam Kỳ. On 21 September at 16:35 a brigade reconnaissance element directed mortar fire onto 7 PAVN/VC they had sighted 12 miles (19 km) west of Tam Kỳ killing 5 of them. On 22 September at 09:45 a brigade unit air-assaulted into an area 16 miles (26 km) west of Tam Kỳ. Three UH-1 helicopters were hit by PAVN/VC ground fire and made forced landings in the vicinity, destroying two of the helicopters and damaging the third. The infantrymen contacted and engaged a PAVN/VC force in the area of the landing zone. Heavy small-arms fi and automatic weapons fire was exchanged and the PAVN/VC employed RPGs. Another element of the brigade reinforced, and fighting continued into the early afternoon with helicopter gunships and artillery supporting the ground troops. At 13:10 the PAVN/VC withdrew, leaving 15 dead and one crew-served weapon, US losses were 5 killed. On 30 September helicopter gunships from the 212th Combat Aviation Battalion observed and engaged PAVN/VC 17 miles (27 km) north of Tam Kỳ killing 26 PAVN/VC and destroying two sampans and two structures.

On 2 October a brigade unit found 8 PAVN/VC bodies 9 miles (14 km) southwest of Tam Kỳ, they had apparently been killed in air strikes several weeks previously.

On 6 December at 10:30 a brigade unit engaged a PAVN/VC force 22 miles (35 km) southwest of Tam Kỳ. The PAVN/VC employed small-arms fi, automatic weapons and mortars. The infantrymen returned fire supported by artillery and helicopter gunships. One PAVN/VC was killed and 2 US were killed. On 26 December at 07:15 a brigade armored cavalry unit received RPG fire 12 miles (19 km) northwest of Tam Kỳ, the troops returned fire with unit weapons, including tank guns and heavy machine guns, and at 07:30 the PAVN/VC withdrew. The unit pursued and reestablished contact in the same general area at 09:25. At 11:00 the PAVN/VC withdrew, leaving 2 dead. US losses were 2 killed.

=== 1970 ===
On 6 January at 12:00 elements of the armored cavalry squadron and ARVN Regional Force troops engaged a PAVN/VC force 4 miles (6.4 km) west of Tam Kỳ. Heavy small-arms fi and automatic weapons fire was exchanged and the combined ground force was supported by helicopter gunships and artillery. At 12:15 a UH-1 helicopter was hit by PAVN/VC ground fire and crashed in the vicinity. At 12:30, an AH-1 Cobra helicopter gunship was hit by ground fire and crashed. As fighting continued, at about 16:00, in the same general area, another AH-l was hit by 12.7mm anti-aircraft machinegun fire and crashed. At 18:25 the PAVN/VC withdrew leaving 45 dead and two individual weapons. On 7 January at 08:30 armored cavalry troops received small-arms fi, automatic weapons and RPG fire from an unknown size 12 miles (19 km) northwest of Tam Kỳ. The troops fired back supported by helicopter gunships and artillery. At 15:00 the PAVN/VC withdrew, leaving 39 dead, 16 individual and 7 crew-served weapons, US losses were 5 killed. On 11 January at 02:15 a brigade reconnaissance unit received small-arms fi and automatic weapons fire along with hand grenades 14 miles (23 km) west of Tam Kỳ. The unit fought back supported by artillery fire. The PAVN/VC withdrew, leaving 8 dead and 1 individual weapon, US casualties were 2 killed. At 10:20 the same day a brigade unit engaged an estimated 8-12 PAVN 13 miles (21 km) west northwest of Tam Kỳ, killing 5 PAVN and capturing 1 individual weapon. At 16:10 the same day a brigade unit engaged an estimated PAVN/VC company 5 miles (8.0 km) west of Tam Kỳ. The PAVN/VC used small-arms fi and automatic weapons fire from fortified positions and were supported by 60 mm and 82 mm mortar fire. Fighting continued until 19:00 when the PAVN/VC withdrew. US losses were 2 killed. On 12 January at 09:45 a brigade unit received small-arms fi and automatic weapons fire from 15-20 PAVN/VC 6 miles (9.7 km) west of Tam Kỳ. The infantrymen fired back supported by artillery and the PAVN/VC withdrew, leaving behind 5 dead. At 13:00 1 mile (1.6 km) to the northwest, other infantrymen of the brigade, reinforced by the division's armored cavalry squadron, received heavy small-arms fi, automatic weapons and RPG fire. The troops fired back with unit weapons and were supported by artillery and helicopter gunships. Fighting continued until 15:00 when the PAVN/VC withdrew, leaving 19 dead and 5 individual weapons, US casualties were 1 killed. At 15:15 800 meters to the southwest another Brigade unit reinforced with armored cavalry troops, received heavy small-arms fi, automatic weapons and RPG fire. The troops returned fire with unit weapons, and were supported by helicopter gunships and artillery. Fighting continued for about two hours until the PAVN/VC withdrew. The bodies of 31 PAVN/VC were found together with 4 individual weapons and two 12.7mm heavy machine guns. On 29 January at 10:15 a brigade unit observed an estimated 45-50 PAVN/VC with packs and weapons 13 miles (21 km) west of Tam Kỳ, artillery fire was directed onto the location and they were also hit by helicopter gunships and tactical aircraft. The PAVN/VC withdrew leaving behind 6 dead, 1 individual weapon and 9 packs. On 30 January at 12:00 brigade armored cavalry troops received heavy small-arms fi, automatic weapons and RPG fire 6 miles (9.7 km) southwest of Tam Kỳ. The troops returned fire supported by artillery, helicopter gunships and USAF F-4's from the 37th Tactical Fighter Wing. The PAVN/VC withdrew two hours later, leaving 5 dead. On 31 January at 18:10 a brigade unit observed 20 PAVN/VC 11 miles (18 km) west of Tam Kỳ, artillery fire was directed onto the location and the bodies of 10 PAVN/VC were observed in the strike area.

On 10 February at 06:15 10-12 PAVN/VC attacked a brigade night defensive position 8 miles (13 km) west of Tam Kỳ with 82 mm mortar fire, rocket-propelled grenades and small-arms fire, US losses were 1 killed. On 18 February at 18:00 brigade forward observers saw 15 PAVN/VC with packs and weapons moving on a trail 11 miles (18 km) west northwest of Tam Kỳ, artillery fire was directed onto the location and the bodies of PAVN/VC were sighted in the strike area. On 20 February at 15:00 a brigade armored cavalry unit received heavy small-arms fi and automatic weapons fire, along with RPGs 12 miles (19 km) northwest of Tam Kỳ. The troops returned fire with unit weapons, including tank guns and heavy machine guns, and were supported by artillery and helicopter gunships. As the fighting continued, an infantry element of the brigade was air-assaulted into the vicinity to reinforce the troops in contact. A USAF AC-119 gunship later reinforced the ground elements. At 19:50 the PAVN/VC withdrew, leaving behind 4 dead and 3 individual weapons, US losses were 14 killed. On 22 February at 07:35 a brigade fire support base 23 miles (37 km) southwest of Tam Kỳ received small-arms fi, automatic weapons, 57 mm recoilless rifle and 60 mm mortar fire. The defenders returned fire supported by artillery, helicopter gunships, and tactical aircraft. US losses were 1 killed. The same day at 09:50 a brigade unit, reinforced by the Division's armored cavalry squadron, received small-arms, automatic weapons and RPG fire 14 miles (23 km) northwest of Tam Kỳ. The troops fired back with unit weapons and were supported by helicopter gunships and artillery. Sporadic fighting continued until 18:50 when the PAVN/VC withdrew under cover of darkness leaving 23 dead, 12 individual and 1 crew-served weapon. US losses were 2 killed.

On 5 March at 15:15 brigade troops were air-assaulted into an area 15 miles (24 km) northwest of Tam Kỳ where they engaged an estimated 30-40 PAVN/VC. The troops were supported by helicopter aerial machinegun fire during the action. The helicopters received 12.7mm anti-aircraft machinegun fire from the area. Contact was lost at about 16:20 when the PAVN/VC withdrew. 7 PAVN/VC were killed and 1 captured, US losses were 1 killed. Ten minutes later in the same area, helicopter gunship crewmen engaged 6 PAVN/VC with aerial machinegun fire, killing all 6. On 6 March at 13:55 a brigade unit received heavy small-arms fire 14 miles (23 km) northwest of Tam Kỳ, the unit returned fire and at 15:55 the PAVN/VC withdrew, leaving 7 dead and 3 individual weapons. On 19 March at 07:25 13 miles (21 km) an armored personnel carrier detonated a PAVN/VC mine believed to have been made from a 250-pound bomb. 9 US soldiers were killed in the explosion and the armored personnel carrier was destroyed.

On 17 April at 12:20 a brigade unit observed 20-25 PAVN/VC soldiers 15 miles (24 km) southwest of Tam Kỳ. The PAVN/VC opened fire with small-arms fi and automatic weapons and the troops returned fire supported by helicopter gunships and artillery. The PAVN/VC withdrew leaving 4 dead, 4 individual weapons and 10 PAVN uniforms.

On 15 September at 13:15 a brigade unit supported by helicopter gunships engaged a PAVN/VC force 8 miles (13 km) west southwest of Tam Kỳ, 20 PAVN/VC were killed, 10 by the gunships, 4 individual weapons, one radio and one telephone were captured. At 16:50 the same unit engaged further PAVN/VC 200 meters south of the original contact, killing 10 PAVN/VC.

On 2 November at 13:22, a brigade unit engaged PAVN/VC 27 miles (43 km) southwest of Tam Kỳ. Helicopter gunships supported the action in which 4 PAVN/VC were killed and 3 individual weapons captured.

On 3 November a Forward Air Controller called in an air strike resulting in 5 PAVN killed. On 6 November Company C, 1st Battalion, 46th Infantry Regiment found 7 graves of PAVN/VC killed by airstrikes. On 10 November Company D, 1/46th killed 3 PAVN. On 18 November Company B, 3rd Battalion, 21st Infantry Regiment engaged 5 PAVN, killing 1. Company A, 4th Battalion, 31st Infantry Regiment found an 82 mm mortar tube with base plate, three 7.62mm light machine guns and one RPG launcher. On 25 November Company C, 1/46th found a weapons cache consisting of 23 individual weapons and 6 crew served weapon. On the afternoon of 26 November a Troop D 1st Squadron 1st Cavalry Regiment LOH received small-arms fire from 5-10 PAVN. They unit then engaged them, killing 5. In light and scattered contacts on 27 November the brigade reported 1 PAVN killed with 1 weapon captured. On 28 November Company C 1/46th found 3 VC graves and a 75 mm recoilless rifle. In a series of small unit engagements on 30 November 7 PAVN were killed.

During the first six days of December light activity prevailed. On 11 December elements of Company B, 2nd Battalion, 1st Infantry Regiment encountered a PAVN unit, killing 1. Scattered contacts on the 12th and 13 December resulted in 11 VC killed and 13 weapons captured. On 23 December a booby-trap killed 1 soldier of Company A, 1/46th. On 24 December Company D, 2/1st engaged a PAVN/VC force. Offensive operations ended at 18:00 on 24 December for a 24-hour Christmas truce. On 29 December the 116th Aviation Regiment killed 8 PAVN and Troop F, 8th Cavalry engaged 7 PAVN, killing 1. On 31 December Company A, 4/31st detonated a booby trap, resulting in 1 US killed. At 18:00 on 31 December the division assumed a defensive posture for the New Year's truce with only defensive patrolling and defensive ambushes were employed.

=== 1971 ===
Division units resumed offensive operations at 18:01 on 1 January 1971. Brigade soldiers engaged 4 VC, killing all 4 and capturing 2 weapons. There was light and scattered action until 9 January when Company B 2/1st was ambushed by 10 PAVN; in the resulting firefight 5 PAVN were killed and 4 weapons captured. At 12:45 Company C, 1/46th engaged 5 PAVN, killing all 5 and capturing 6 weapons. At 18:30 Company C, 1/46th engaged 6 PAVN. On the 11th and 12 January Company C, 2/1st in 4 engagements killed 4 PAVN/VC and captured 2 weapons for the loss of 2 US killed. On the 13th and 14th, in 4 engagements Company C, 1/46th killed 4 PAVN/VC, captured 4 and captured 2 weapons. On 15 January, Battery C, 3rd Battalion, 16th Field Artillery Regiment killed 10 PAVN/VC. Action was light until 18 January when an airstrike killed 5 PAVN.

On 1 February Company C, 1/46th found a weapons cache consisting of 222 individual and 18 crew-served weapons. On 9 February, Company A, 3/21st engaged a 10 man VC patrol resulting in 3 VC killed and 4 weapons captured. On the morning of 11 February, Company C, 1/46th was ambushed losing 2 killed. Later the same day they uncovered another weapons cache containing 50 individual weapons. On 12 February Company C, 1/46th was fired on, resulting in 2 US killed. On 20 February Company A, 3/21st were attacked by grenades and small-arms fire, killing 1 US. On the same day Company D, 1/46th Infantry detonated a booby-trap resulting in 3 US killed.

== Aftermath ==
The operation terminated on 28 February 1971. US losses were 572 killed while PAVN losses were 7,514 killed and 133 captured.
