= Landing Zone Professional =

Site information
- Type: Army
- Condition: abandoned

Location
- Coordinates: 15.466°N 108.361°E

Site history
- Built: 1968
- In use: 1968-71
- Battles/wars: Vietnam War

Garrison information
- Occupants: 23rd Infantry Division

Landing Zone Professional (also known as FSB Professional or Hill 185) is a former U.S. Army base northwest of Chu Lai, Quang Tin Province, Vietnam.

== History ==
The base was established in 1968 by the 23rd Infantry Division and was located approximately 32 km northwest of Chu Lai and 16 km southwest of Landing Zone East.

The base was occupied by elements of the 1st Battalion, 46th Infantry Regiment and 1st Battalion, 14th Artillery when it was attacked by the People's Army of Vietnam (PAVN) V-16 Sapper Battalion on the early morning of 12 May 1969. Following the sapper attack the PAVN continued to mortar the base and set up heavy machine guns to prevent helicopter support. On 13 May the PAVN 3rd Regiment 2nd Division engaged Company A 1/46th Infantry near the base, the Company commander Captain Kern W. Dunagan would be awarded the Medal of Honor for his actions near the base from 12-14 May 1969. On 15 May elements of the 1st Brigade, 101st Airborne were deployed to the area near Professional to lift the siege. CH-47B Chinook #67-18458 was hit by PAVN fire and crashed with no fatalities.

Other units based at Professional included:

- 1st Battalion, 52nd Infantry Regiment
