= Tam Kỳ Base Camp =

Site information
- Type: Army

Location
- Coordinates: 15.535°N 108.485°E

Site history
- Built: 1968
- In use: 1968-present
- Battles/wars: Vietnam War

Garrison information
- Occupants: 1st Cavalry Regiment; 3rd Brigade, 23rd Infantry Division

Tam Kỳ Airfield
- IATA: none; ICAO: none

Summary
- Elevation AMSL: 33 ft (10 m)

Runways
Direction	Length		Surface
Direction	ft	m	Surface
	4,000	1,219	asphalt

Tam Kỳ Base Camp (also known as Tam Kỳ Airfield) is a former U.S. Army base near the city of Tam Kỳ, Quảng Nam Province Vietnam.

== History ==
The base was located south of Highway 1 approximately 1.5 km south of the city of Tam Kỳ.

The 2nd Battalion, 1st Infantry was based at Tam Kỳ from March–April 1968 and August–November 1968.

The 198th Infantry Brigade, comprising:

- 1st Battalion, 46th Infantry
- 5th Battalion, 46th Infantry

was based at Tam Kỳ in November 1968.

The 1st Cavalry Regiment was based at Tam Kỳ from February–September 1969, August–September 1970 and November 1970-May 1972.

The 1st Brigade, 101st Airborne Division, comprising:

- 1st Battalion, 327th Infantry
- 2nd Battalion, 327th Infantry

was based at Tam Kỳ from June–August 1969

Elements of the 3rd Brigade, 23rd Infantry Division were based at Tam Kỳ from August 1970 to April 1971.

== Current use ==
The base appears to remain in use by the People's Army of Vietnam.
