= 46th Infantry Regiment (United States) =

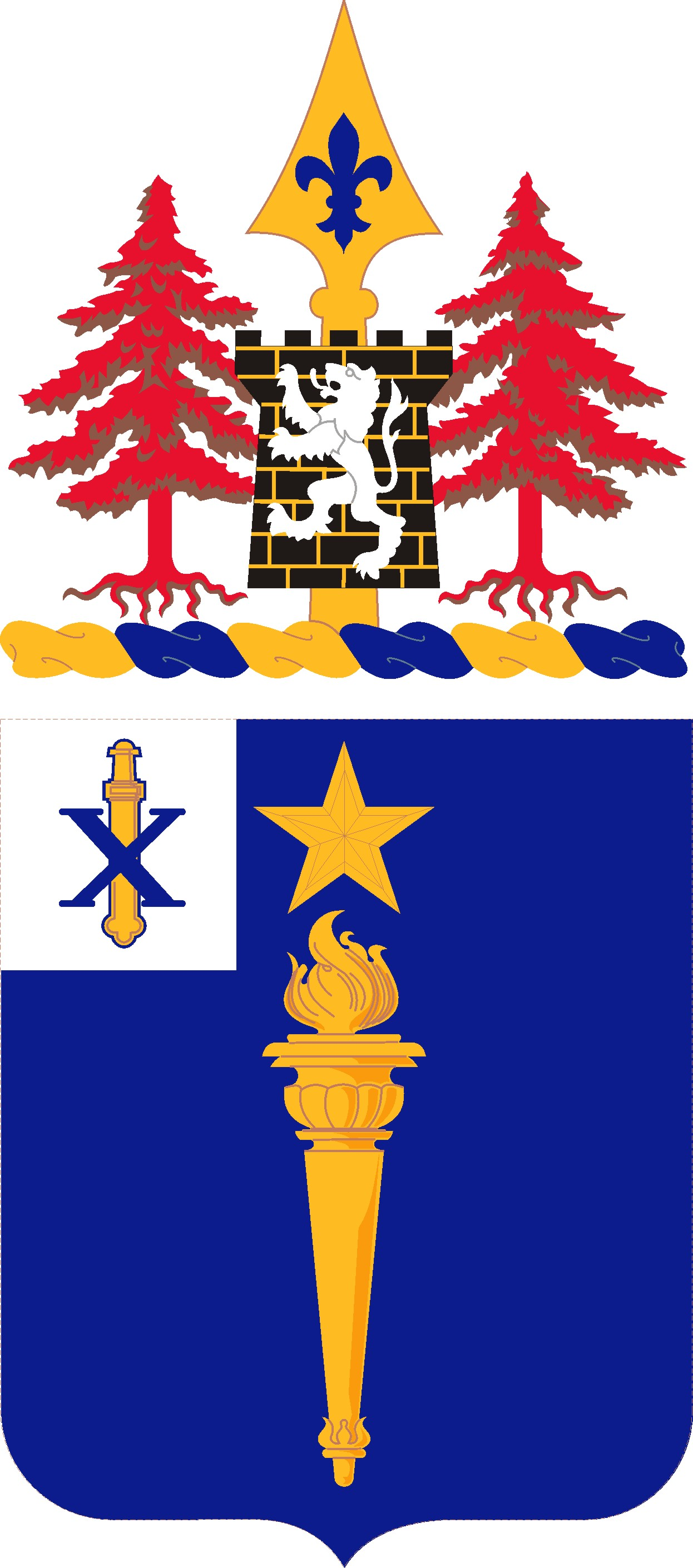
- Coat of arms
- Active: 1917–present
- Country: United States
- Branch: United States Army
- Type: Infantry
- Nickname: "The Professionals" (special designation)
- Motto: Lead to Victory

Insignia
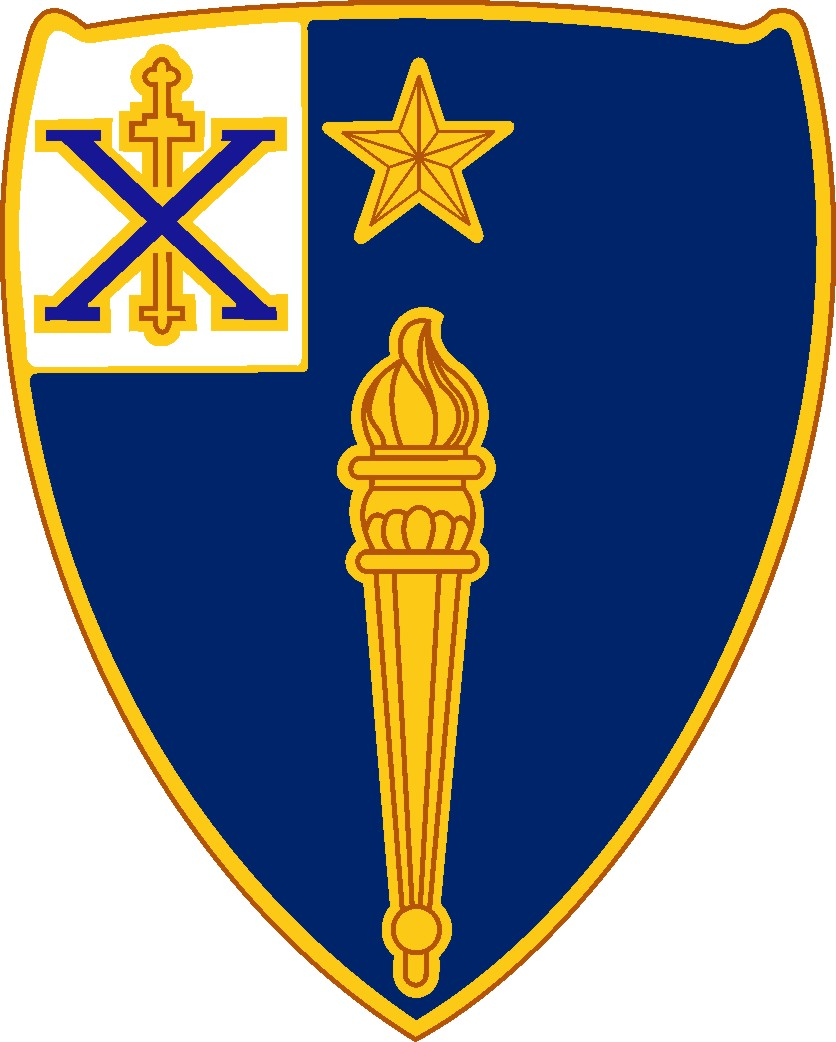
- Distinctive unit insignia

The 46th Infantry Regiment ("The Professionals") is a unit in the United States Army that served in World War II and Vietnam. The 1st Battalion, 46th Infantry Regiment currently conducts Infantry One Station Unit Training under the 197th Infantry Brigade.

== History ==
=== World War I ===
The 46th Infantry Regiment was organized and commanded by Colonel Charles Carr Clark around a cadre from the 10th Infantry Regiment and was assigned to the 9th Division. The war ended before the division could be deployed overseas and it was disbanded on 15 February 1919 at Camp Sheridan, Alabama.

=== Interwar period ===
The 46th Infantry was stationed at Fort Oglethorpe, Georgia, as of June 1919 as a separate regiment. It was transferred in 1920 to Eagle Pass, Texas, and transferred in September 1921, less the 2nd Battalion, to Camp Travis, Texas. The 2nd Battalion was transferred on 4 November 1921 to Fort Sam Houston, Texas. The regiment was inactivated on 16 November 1921 at Camp Travis, with the personnel concurrently transferred to units of the 2nd Division, and was demobilized (disbanded) on 31 July 1922. It was reconstituted on 28 August 1941 as the 46th Infantry (Armored) and activated on 1 October 1941 at Fort Knox, Kentucky.

=== World War II ===
During World War II, the 46th Infantry Regiment was assigned to the 5th Armored Division. Landing at Normandy in 1944, the 46th Infantry led the 5th Armored Division in five campaigns earning the nickname "Victory’s Spearpoint".

For their repeated courage under fire, the 2nd Battalion, 46th Infantry, was awarded two Presidential Unit Citations, the French Croix de Guerre, and the Luxembourg Croix de Guerre, those nation's highest awards for gallantry in action.

=== Cold War ===
The 4th Battalion, 46th Infantry was deployed to help suppress the April 1968 Chicago riots.

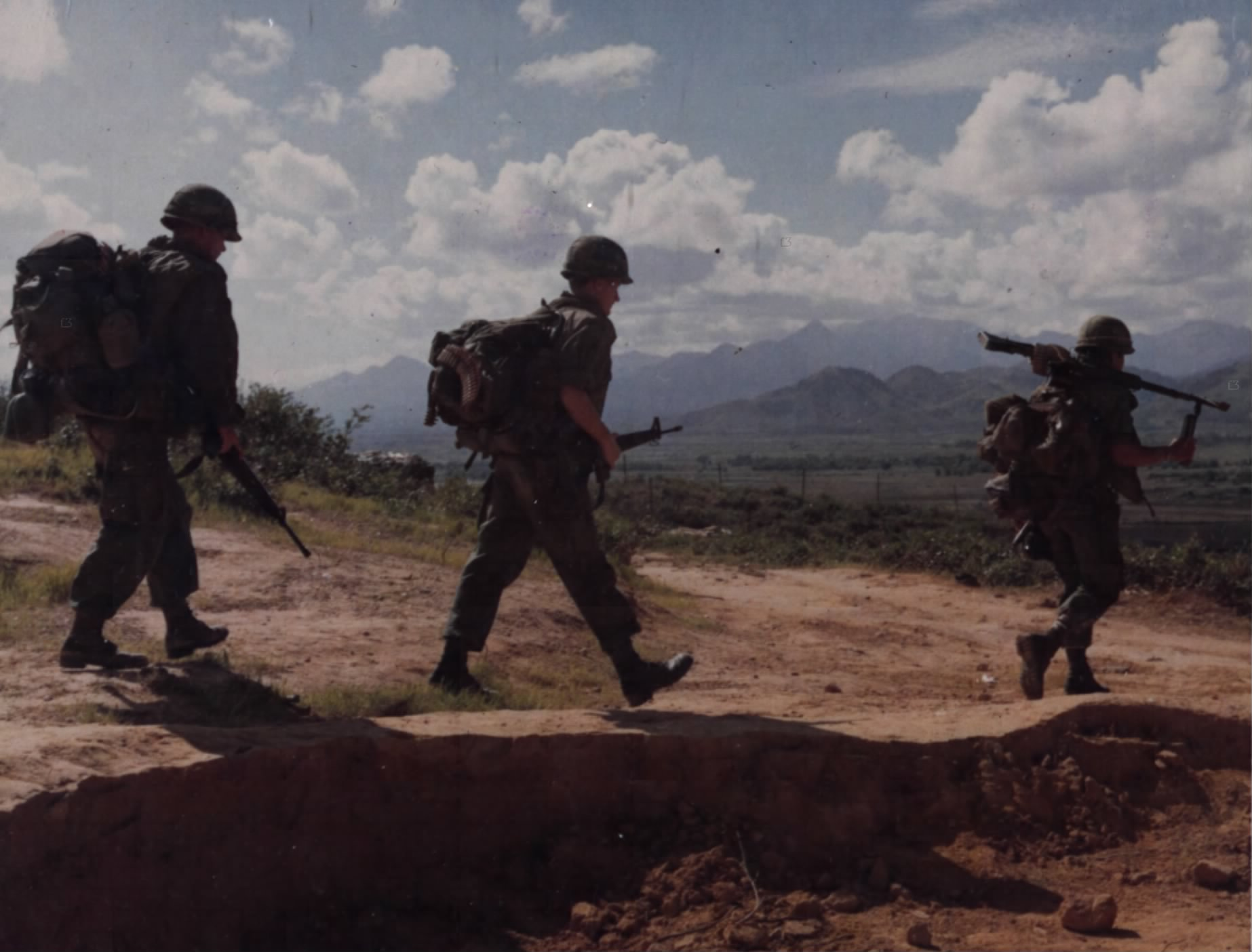
Men of Company "D", 5th Battalion, 46th Infantry, move out from Landing Zone Buff at the start of a short range recon patrol, 9 December 1968

During the Vietnam War, the 1st Battalion, 46th Infantry and the 5th Battalion, 46th Infantry were part of the Americal Division. Both initially deployed to Vietnam with the 198th Infantry Brigade from Fort Hood, Texas. But the 1-46th was placed under operational control of the 196th Infantry Brigade (Light) and later became fully a part of the 196th Brigade. Though the 5-46th left Vietnam when the Americal Division cased its colors in the fall of 1971, the 1-46th deployed to Da Nang with the rest of the 196th. The 1-46th left Vietnam in June 1972.

The 1st Battalion, 46th Infantry subsequently was assigned to 2nd Brigade, 1st Armored Division at Ferris Barracks, Erlangen, Germany. It continued in this assignment until late 1984. The battalion was organized as a mechanized infantry battalion. By 1981, as VII Corps flank battalion on the movement to the General Defense Position (GDP), the battalion's initial mission had flanking units of the West German Corps to the southeast. As a result, the battalion maintained an active partnership with a panzer and a panzer grenadier battalion that had the German corps' flank mission, initially Panzerbatallion 104, Pfreimd, and later Panzergrenadierbatallion 122, Oberviechtach. Throughout 1982–4, the battalion was in the process of reorganizing to become a Bradley Infantry Fighting Vehicle equipped unit. The maintenance sections were consolidated into headquarters company, the infantry company anti-tank sections were consolidated into an anti-tank company, additional 2 1/2-ton trucks were received, a fourth infantry company was formed, and the M578 Light Recovery Vehicles were replaced by the heavier M88 Recovery Vehicles among other changes in preparation. LTC Werner Banisch commanded for much of this period of reorganization preparation with Major Thomas Rozman commanding as acting commander for several months.

The 2nd Battalion, 46th Infantry, was a garrison unit in Europe until September 1972 when it was inactivated.

In October 1987, the 2nd Battalion, 46th Infantry, was reactivated at Fort Knox as a basic training battalion, (assets derived from the 13th Training Battalion), charged with providing the force with disciplined, highly motivated and physically conditioned soldiers. Note: the entire 4th Training Brigade during this time consisted of the 1st, 2nd, 3rd, and 4th battalions of the 46th Infantry. Later the 3rd and 4th were deactivated leaving only the 1st Battalion ("Professionals") and the 2nd Battalion ("Lead to Victory") as the last two basic training battalions at Fort Knox.

=== Modern ===
In 2011, the 1st Battalion became part of the 192d Infantry Brigade at Fort Benning, Georgia, where it continued to serve as a basic training battalion. The 1st Battalion, 46th Infantry Regiment served as a Basic Combat Training battalion on Sand Hill at Fort Benning, Georgia, organized under the 194th Armored Brigade. In 2020 it transitioned to Infantry One Station Unit Training under the 197th Infantry Brigade.

== Distinctive unit insignia ==
- Description

A Gold color metal and enamel device 1 5/32 inches (2.9 cm) in height overall consisting of a shield blazoned: Azure, in pale a mullet and a flaming torch Or. On a canton Argent a Roman numeral "X" of the first superimposed on a Roman sword in scabbard palewise point down Or.

- Symbolism

This Regiment was organized in 1917 at Fort Benjamin Harrison, Indiana, from the 10th Infantry. The field is blue, the Infantry color. The charge, a gold torch and star, is taken from the flag of the State of Indiana while the badge of the 10th Infantry is shown on the canton.

- Background

The distinctive unit insignia was originally approved for the 46th Armored Infantry Regiment on 24 February 1942. It was redesignated for the 46th Armored Infantry Battalion on 30 November 1943. The insignia was redesignated for the 46th Infantry Regiment on 2 January 1959.

== Coat of arms ==
- Blazon
  - Shield: Azure, in pale a mullet and a flaming torch Or. On a canton Argent a Roman numeral "X" of the first superimposed on a Roman sword in scabbard palewise point down Or fimbriated of the field.
  - Crest: On a wreath Or and Azure between two pine trees eradicated Gules a spear issuant from the base of the first charged on the point with a fleur-de-lis of the second and enfiled by a castle tower Sable masoned of the first charged with a lion rampant Argent.
  - Motto: VICTORY’S POINT.
- Symbolism
  - Shield: This Regiment was organized in 1917 at Fort Benjamin Harrison, Indiana, from the 10th Infantry. The field is blue, the Infantry color. The charge, a gold torch, and a star is taken from the flag of the State of Indiana, while the badge of the 10th Infantry is shown on the canton.
  - Crest: The spearhead bearing a fleur-de-lis represents the unit's participation in the drive from the Normandy Peninsula through Northern France. The black castle signifies the penetration of the Siegfried Line and the campaign in Luxembourg, for which the unit received the Croix de Guerre, is noted by the white lion rampant (adopted from the arms of the town of Diekirch). The red pine trees represent the bitter, arduous fighting in the area of the Hurtgen Forest of Germany.
- Background: The coat of arms was originally approved for the 46th Infantry Regiment on 27 January 1921. It was redesignated for the 46th Infantry (Armored) Regiment on 29 December 1941. It was redesignated for the 46th Armored Infantry Regiment on 9 March 1942. The insignia was redesignated for the 46th Armored Infantry Battalion on 1 December 1943. It was amended to add a crest on 15 December 1965. It was amended to add a motto on 8 March 1988.

== In popular culture ==
Tim O'Brien described his tour in Vietnam with the regiment's Alpha Company, 5th Battalion in his book If I Die in a Combat Zone, Box Me Up and Ship Me Home.
