= 1971 in the Vietnam War =

← 1970 1972 →
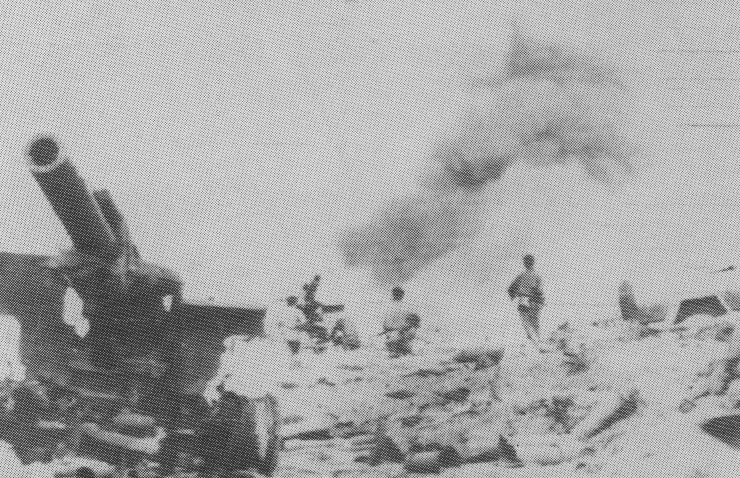
- Fire Support Base Lolo falls to PAVN forces during Operation Lam Son 719
Location	Vietnam

Belligerents
Anti-Communist forces: South Vietnam; United States; South Korea; Australia; New Zealand (Cambodia) Khmer Republic; Thailand; Kingdom of Laos	Communist forces: North Vietnam (Provisional Revolutionary Government of the Republic of South Vietnam) Viet Cong (Cambodia) Khmer Rouge (Laos) Pathet Lao; Soviet Union

Strength
South Vietnam: 1,046,250; United States: 156,800 (end of year); South Korea: 45,700; Thailand: 6,000; Australia: 2,000; Philippines: 50; New Zealand: 100	

Casualties and losses
US: 2,414 killed South Vietnam: 22,738 killed	

At the start of 1971 South Vietnamese troops continued operations against the North Vietnamese People's Army of Vietnam (PAVN) and Vietcong (VC) base areas in eastern Cambodia. The ill-conceived and poorly executed Operation Lam Son 719 against PAVN supply lines in eastern Laos showed the weaknesses within the South Vietnamese military command and the limited ability of South Vietnam's armed forces to conduct large-scale combined arms operations. The U.S. continued its unilateral withdrawal from South Vietnam despite the lack of any progress in the Paris Peace Talks and by November U.S. forces had ceased offensive operations. The U.S. withdrawal and antiwar sentiment within the military led to an ongoing decline in morale and discipline within the U.S. forces and growing drug use, particularly of heroin. As U.S. combat units withdrew, security in their former operational areas deteriorated and the PAVN/VC began a series of attacks on ARVN positions in Quảng Trị province and the Central Highlands. In Cambodia the Cambodian government continued to lose ground to the PAVN despite extensive U.S. air support and training and periodic attacks into Cambodia by the ARVN. While the bombing of North Vietnam had ceased in November 1968, U.S. aircraft continued to conduct reconnaissance flights over the North and responded to radar-tracking and antiaircraft fire with "protective reaction" strikes which numbered more than 100 by the year-end and culminated in a five-day bombing campaign in late December.

== January ==
1 January

U.S. military personnel in South Vietnam totaled 334,600 on 31 December 1970.

1 January - May 1971

Project Copper was an unsuccessful operation to use three Central Intelligence Agency (CIA)-trained Cambodian irregular force battalions to interdict the Sihanouk Trail. One battalion deserted, one mutinied during training and the third suffered extensive casualties and had to be withdrawn to assist in the defense of Phnom Penh.

5 January

The United States Congress adopted the revised Cooper-Church Amendment which prohibited the introduction of U.S. ground troops or advisers into Cambodia and declared that U.S. aid to Cambodia should not be considered a commitment to the defense of Cambodia.

5 January - 11 February

Operation Silver Buckle was a Royal Lao Army (RLA) offensive staged in Military Region 4 of Laos and was the deepest RLA penetration to date of the Ho Chi Minh Trail. Reaching the Trailside village of Moung Nong, the forward two companies attacked the rear of the 50,000 man People's Army of Vietnam (PAVN) garrison on 8 February 1971, just as Operation Lam Son 719 was launched by the Army of the Republic of Vietnam (ARVN) and diverted at least six PAVN battalions away from the ARVN assault.

5 January - 30 May

The ARVN launched Operation Toàn Thắng TT02 which culminated in the Battle of Snuol against PAVN and Viet Cong (VC) forces in the Snuol District of Cambodia. The PAVN/VC lost 1,043 killed while the ARVN lost 37 killed, 74 missing and more than 300 captured. The operation rendered the ARVN 5th Division combat ineffective.

6 January

U.S. Secretary of Defense Melvin Laird said that the "Vietnamization" of the war was running ahead of schedule and that the combat mission of the U.S. troops would end in summer 1971.

Military Assistance Command Vietnam (MACV) announced a program to combat drug abuse among U.S. servicemen in South Vietnam with some 65,000 servicemen estimated to be drug abusers in 1970.

7 January

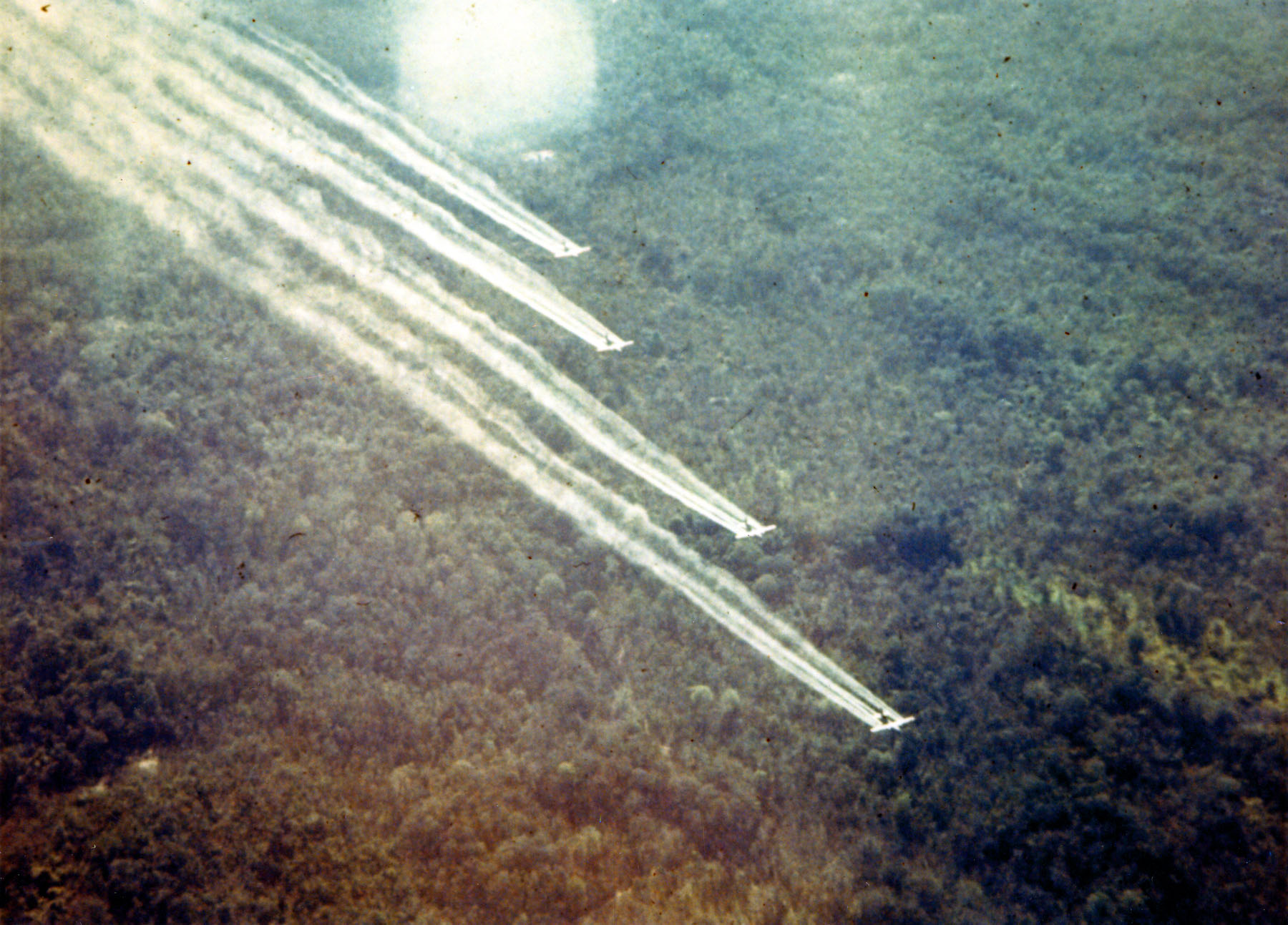
Operation Ranch Hand mission

The last herbicide spraying by the United States to defoliate forests in South Vietnam and kill crops used to feed communist soldiers and supporters was carried out in Ninh Thuan province. Operation Ranch Hand was finished.

8 January

U.S. jets carried out "protective reaction" strikes attacking two North Vietnamese Surface to air missile sites north of the Vietnamese Demilitarized Zone (DMZ).

11 January - 29 March

The 1st Battalion 1st Marines conducted Operation Upshur Stream, continuous reconnaissance and infantry patrolling and concentrated air and artillery attacks in an effort to prevent the PAVN/VC from using the Charlie Ridge base area for attacks against Da Nang.

12 January

A group of religious anti-war activists, led by Philip Berrigan, who became known as the Harrisburg Seven, were indicted on charges of planning to kidnap National Security Advisor Henry Kissinger and blow up steam tunnels under federal buildings in Washington D.C.

The Concerned Officers Movement held a press conference where they called for an investigation into the "responsibility for war crimes of key military figures", including Generals William Westmoreland and Creighton Abrams and Admiral Elmo Zumwalt.

13 January

President Richard Nixon signed legislation repealing the Gulf of Tonkin Resolution which had been used as the legal basis for U.S., involvement in the war.

13 to 25 January

The ARVN 4th Armor Brigade and 4th Ranger Group and the 2nd Marine Brigade together with Khmer National Armed Forces (FANK) forces launched Operation Cuu Long 44-02 to reopen Route 4 in Cambodia. The operation resulted in 211 PAVN and 16 ARVN killed.

17 January

300 ARVN paratroopers with U.S. air support and advisers raided a suspected camp holding American prisoners of war in Cambodia. No POWs were in the camp, but 30 PAVN soldiers were captured.

Joint U.S., South Vietnamese and Cambodian convoys begin up the Mekong River to supply Phnom Penh after Khmer Rouge attacks had cut off overland supply from Cambodia's seaports.

21-2 January

PAVN sappers attacked Pochentong Airfield near Phnom Penh and destroyed or damaged 69 Khmer National Aviation (AVNK) aircraft and killed 39 AVNK personnel, effectively destroying the AVNK.

24 January

NBC reported that soldiers of the 173rd Airborne Brigade stationed at Landing Zone English were buying heroin from a Vietnamese house on the base and the South Vietnamese then proceeded to demolish the house.

30 January

U.S. forces launch Operation Dewey Canyon II to reopen Route 9 to the abandoned Khe Sanh Combat Base as the initial phase of Operation Lam Son 719.

== February ==
2 February - 30 April

Campaign 74B was a PAVN combined arms operation that recaptured the strategic Plain of Jars and brought the PAVN 316th Division within artillery range of the major RLA base at Long Tieng. The assault was stopped by Thai mercenary forces and U.S. air support and the PAVN withdrew as they exhausted their supplies.

3 February - 10 March

In Operation Hoang Dien 103, units of III Marine Amphibious Force, Republic of Korea Marine Corps 2nd Marine Brigade, ARVN 51st Regiment, 146th Popular Force (PF) Platoon, 39th Regional Force (RF) Company and People's Self-Defense Force (PSDF) units combed the Da Nang lowlands and lowland fringes, killing 330 PAVN/VC, while losing 46 killed, including two Americans.

8 February

President of the Khmer Republic (Cambodia) Lon Nol suffered a stroke and passed control to Prince Sisowath Sirik Matak.

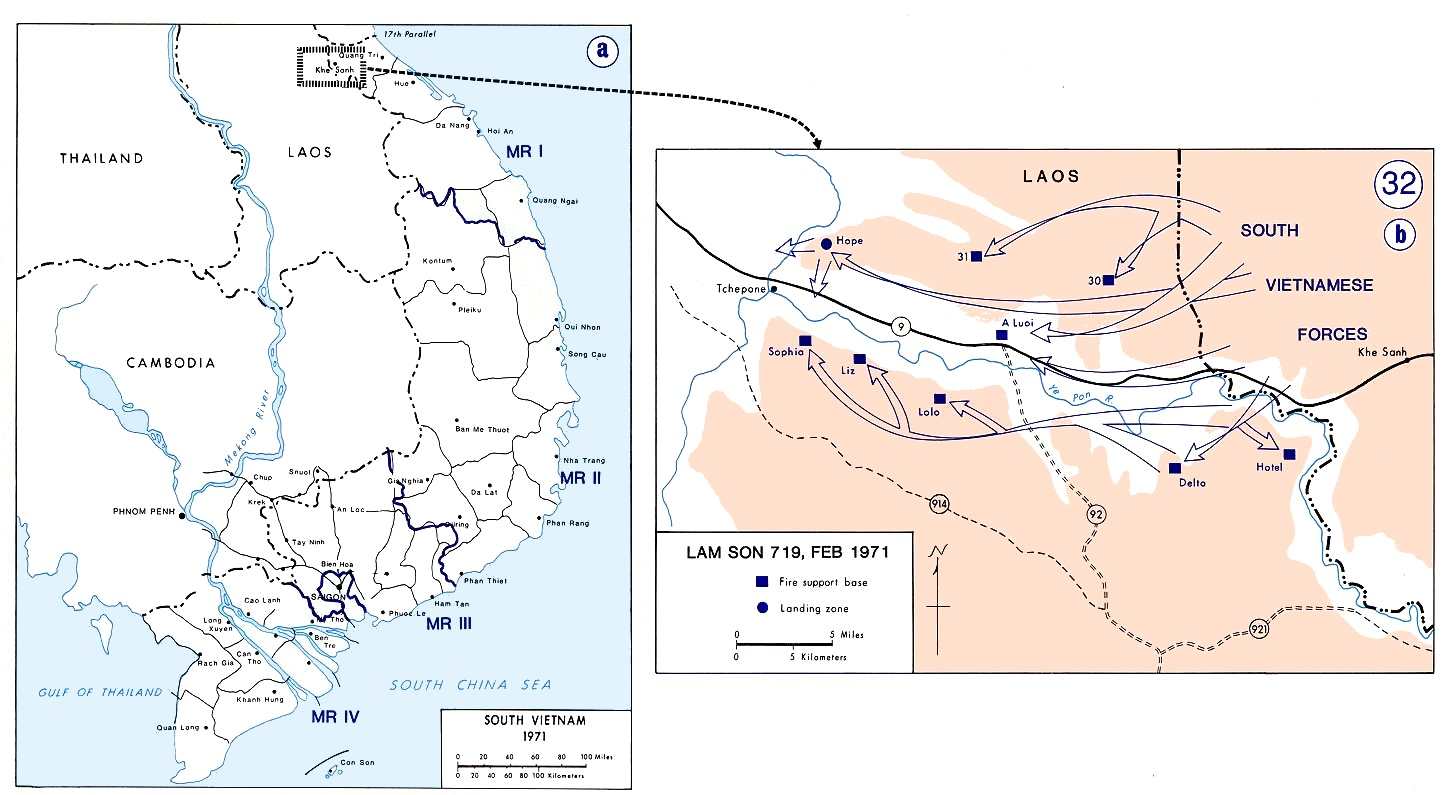
South Vietnam and Operation Lam Son 719.

8 February- 25 March

Operation Lam Son 719 (Vietnamese: Chiến dịch Lam Sơn 719 or Chiến dịch đường 9 – Nam Lào) was an invasion by 20,000 soldiers of the armed forces of South Vietnam of southeastern Laos. The objective of the operation was the disruption of the Ho Chi Minh Trail which supplied PAVN and VC forces in South Vietnam. Although claiming victory, the ARVN withdrew from Laos in disorder and suffered 9,000 casualties. U.S. forces were prohibited from entering Laos but provided air support for the operation and had 253 soldiers killed and many helicopters destroyed.

10 February

In Operation Lam Son 719, an armoured column of the ARVN reached Ban Dong, 20 kilometers inside Laos and one half the distance to Tchepone, the objective of the invasion. The route, Highway 9, was only barely passable and the advance stalled. The PAVN concentrated their resistance against a number of small bases established in Laos to support the operation.

A Republic of Vietnam Air Force (RVNAF) UH-1 helicopter carrying photojournalists Larry Burrows, Henri Huet, Kent Potter and Keizaburo Shimamoto and seven others was shot down over Laos killing all on board.

12 February

Armée Nationale Khmère (ANK) Brigadier General Neak Sam was killed along with 14 of his men during operations against the PAVN off Highway 2 10 miles (16 km) south of Takéo.

13 February

Lon Nol was flown to Hawaii aboard a United States Air Force (USAF) jet and taken to Tripler Army Medical Center for treatment.

15-17 February

U.S. jets hit North Vietnamese SAM sites around Vinh over three consecutive days in "protective reaction" strikes.

16 February

USAF Colonel Gerald V. Kehrli, the highest-ranking U.S. officer court-martialled in South Vietnam, was found guilty of seven marijuana offenses and sentenced to three years in prison and a $15,000 fine.

16 February - 3 April

Operation Desert Rat was an RLA operation intended to harass the PAVN as they fought off the ARVN in Operation Lam Son 719. The operation resulted in 121 PAVN killed and 39 trucks destroyed.

17 February

In his first press conference since the start of Lam Son 719, Nixon refused to put any limits on the use of U.S. airpower in Indochina other on than the use of tactical nuclear weapons. Nixon warned of stiffening PAVN resistance in Laos as the PAVN sought to defend their supply lines into South Vietnam and fuelled speculation that the South might attack into North Vietnam.

18 February

North Vietnam said that the U.S. was threatening to expand the war into North Vietnam and that this also threatened China.

20 February

ARVN forces abandoned Landing Zone (LZ) Ranger North (16.744°N 106.493°E) in Laos after two days of artillery bombardment and then armor-infantry assaults. ARVN losses were 178 dead or missing while an estimated 639 PAVN troops were killed during the battle.

22 February

A story in The New York Times titled "Saigon's Rangers driven from an outpost in Laos" depicted the fight at Ranger North as a panicked debacle for the ARVN with able-bodied Rangers pushing their way onto medevac helicopters.

23 February

New ARVN I Corps commander Lieutenant General Đỗ Cao Trí died in a helicopter crash near Bien Hoa Air Base. Photojournalist François Sully leapt 75 feet (23 m) from the burning helicopter but later died of his injuries.

25 February

ARVN Airborne forces abandoned Fire Support Base (FSB) 31 (16.715°N 106.426°E) in Laos after two days of artillery bombardment and then armor-infantry assaults. PAVN losses were approximately 250 killed and 11 PT-76 and T-54 tanks destroyed. The Airborne had 155 killed and over 100 captured.

28 February

The U.S. moved armored units to the Laos border to prevent any PAVN armored thrust eastwards after the loss of FSB 31.

== March ==
1 March

A bomb exploded in the United States Capitol building at 1:32 a.m., injuring nobody but causing $300,000 in damage. The Weather Underground took credit for the bombing which was in protest of the invasion of Laos.

2 March

The ARVN abandoned FSB 30 (16.696°N 106.486°E) in Laos after heavy PAVN artillery fire and ground assaults.

A PAVN mortar and sapper attack on Cambodia's only oil refinery at Kompong Som killed five Cambodians and destroyed 80% of the facility, four PAVN were killed.

Eleven ARVN were killed in an ambush near Suong, Cambodia.

3 March

The 5th Special Forces Group departed South Vietnam.

4 March

North Vietnam fired three SA-2 missiles at U.S. jets flying over northern South Vietnam.

A U.S. Army U-21 on a radio research mission was shot down by a SAM near the DMZ killing all five crewmen on board.

In a press conference Nixon said that Operation Lam Son 719 had seriously damaged North Vietnam's military capabilities and would aid the U.S. withdrawal of forces.

5 March

The 11th Armored Cavalry Regiment, less its 2nd Squadron departed South Vietnam.

6 March

In the largest airborne assault of the war, 276 UH-1 helicopters transported two ARVN battalions to capture Tchepone without major resistance.

9 March

President Nguyễn Văn Thiệu of South Vietnam ordered the withdrawal of South Vietnamese troops from Laos. He ignored the recommendation of Abrams that South Vietnam reinforce its troops in Laos and hold its position. The withdrawal became a rout with South Vietnam suffering heavy casualties.

U.S. jets and helicopter gunships accidentally attacked ARVN forces near Tchepone killing nine.

10 March

Following a visit to Hanoi, Chinese Premier Zhou Enlai issued a communique pledging Chinese support for the North Vietnamese in its fight against the U.S.

Australian Defense Minister Malcolm Fraser resigned claiming that Prime Minister John Gorton was interfering with his ministerial responsibilities and that Gorton was "not fit to hold the great office of Prime Minister." Gorton then resigned as Prime Minister and was replaced by William McMahon.

FANK High Command claimed that 51,505 PAVN/VC had been killed in fighting over the previous year in Cambodia while FANK losses were 4,496 killed. Sources said the FANK losses were largely accurate while the PAVN/VC losses were highly exaggerated.

10 March to 1 July

The 198th Light Infantry Brigade launched Operation Finney Hill to secure lines of communication and pacification operations in the coastal area of Quảng Ngãi Province. The operation resulted in 454 PAVN/VC killed and eight captured, U.S. losses were 32 killed.

10 March to 1 July

The 196th Light Infantry Brigade launched Operation Middlesex Peak a security operation to prevent PAVN/VC infiltration into the coastal lowlands of Quảng Tín and Quảng Ngãi Provinces. The operation resulted in 463 PAVN/VC killed and 22 captured and U.S. losses of 50 killed.

13 March

Hanoi described the assault on Tchepone as a "seven act farce".

14 March

Two USMC A-4 Skyhawks accidentally bombed an ARVN 1st Division position in Laos killing 9 ARVN.

15 March

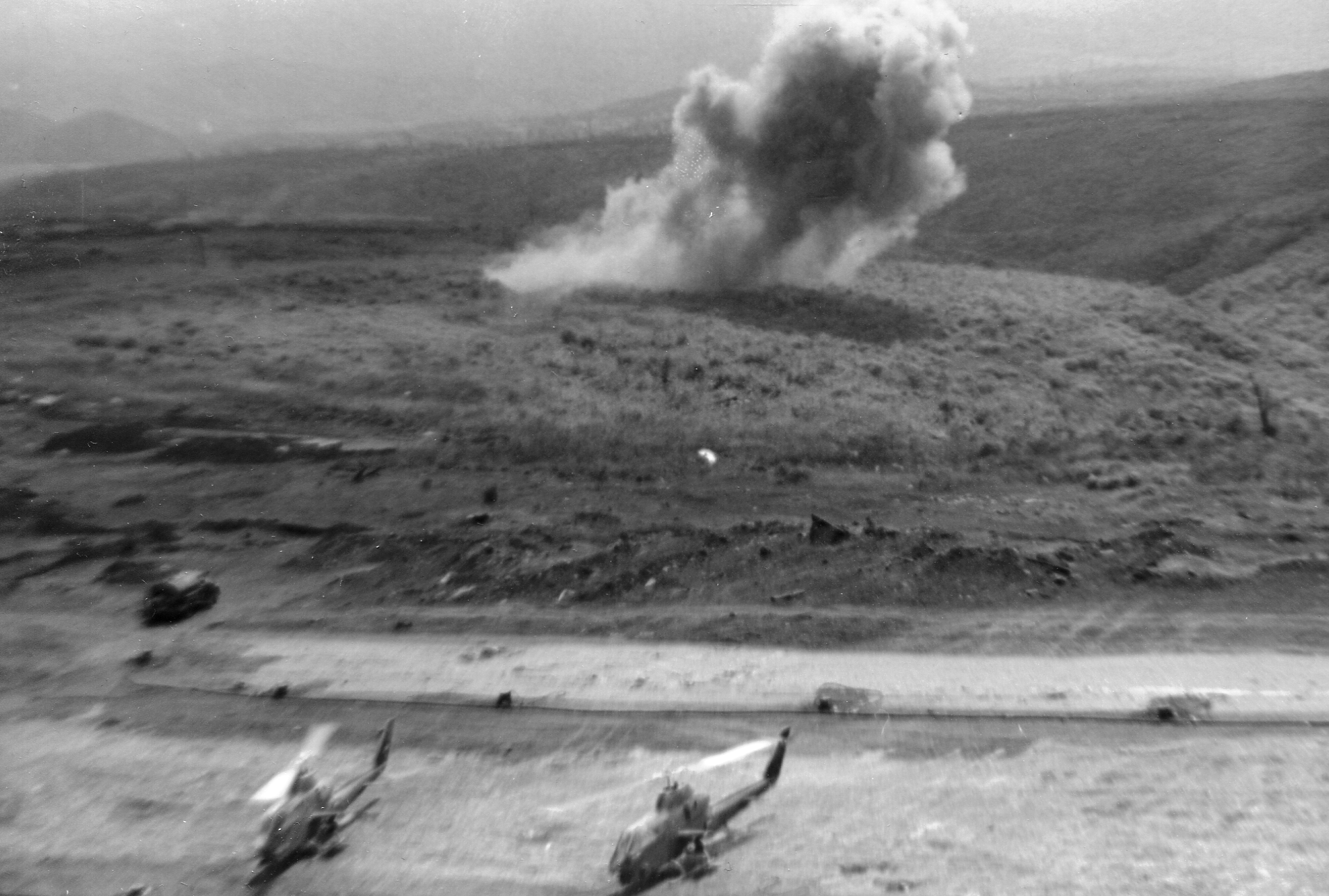
PAVN fire hits near Khe Sanh Combat Base

PAVN artillery began to shell Khe Sanh Combat Base, the main base supporting Operation Lam Son 719.

Newsweek magazine's cover story was titled "The Helicopter War" and described the intensity of U.S. helicopter operations and PAVN antiaircraft fire over Laos.

17 March

MACV advised Washington that budget and manpower restraints were driving the U.S. withdrawal more than the progress of Vietnamization and PAVN/VC battlefield actions.

21 March

Two platoons from Bravo Company, 1st Squadron, 1st Cavalry Regiment refused orders to retrieve a downed helicopter and damaged vehicles on Route 9 between Lang Vei and the Laos border. The unit was withdrawn and the mission completed by another unit and the captain was relieved of command.

The Nixon Administration claimed that the South Vietnamese withdrawal from Laos was an "orderly retreat" and not a rout.

21-3 March

The PAVN fired rockets at Luang Prabang Airport killing six civilians and damaging five aircraft and carried out sapper attacks on six RLA outposts around the airport.

22-3 March

U.S. jets attacked North Vietnamese SAM and antiaircraft sites between the DMZ and the 19th parallel, losing one F-4 Phantom II shot down.

23 March

Kissinger admitted to Nixon that Lam Son 719 "comes out as clearly not a success". The failure of Lam Son 719 was called by one scholar "the military turning point of the war".

NBC News reported the evacuation of an ARVN regiment on Route 9 where soldiers clung to the skids of helicopters rather than waiting for more helicopters that might not come.

A PAVN sapper attack on Khe Sanh Combat Base resulted in three Americans killed and several aircraft and two ammunition dumps destroyed, PAVN losses were 14 killed and one captured.

The Pentagon admitted that Operation Lam Son 719 had been cut short due to the strong PAVN response.

24 March

U.S. air cavalry sighted PAVN armored vehicles at five different locations near Route 9 within 1 mile (1.6 km) of the Laotian side of the border. Helicopter gunships and tactical airstrikes destroyed ten PT-76s.

25 March

In Operation Lam Son 719, most South Vietnamese soldiers had crossed the border back into South Vietnam and fighting in Laos ceased. The New York Times reported that Pentagon sources said that Thiệu had limited the offensive to reduce South Vietnamese losses.

The North Vietnamese and VC delegates to the Paris Peace Talks boycotted the session in protest at the recent U.S. bombing of North Vietnam.

27 March

Three Americans were killed in PAVN shelling of Khe Sanh Combat Base. One American was killed by PAVN artillery fire at Lang Vei and three Americans from the 1st Brigade, 5th Infantry Division (Mechanized) were killed in a clash with PAVN forces north of Route 9.

The New York Times reported that the morale of South Vietnamese units that had fought in Laos had been shattered by the fighting there.

28 March

Several dozen PAVN sappers infiltrated Fire Support Base Mary Ann in Quảng Tín Province and killed 30 American soldiers. Mary Ann was scheduled to be turned over to the ARVN and the U.S. forces withdrawn. Several American officers were demoted or reprimanded for "substandard performance".

29 March

The jury at a military court-martial convicted Lieutenant William Calley of the premeditated murder of 22 Vietnamese civilians during the My Lai massacre of 1968. Calley was the only soldier convicted for his role in the massacre.

PAVN/VC forces killed 103 South Vietnamese civilians and destroyed 1,500 homes in the Duc Duc massacre in Duc Duc District, Quảng Nam Province.

29-30 March

The PAVN captured a 10 miles (16 km) stretch of Route 4 in Cambodia.

30 March

A confidential U.S. Army directive ordered the interception and confiscation of anti-Vietnam War and other dissident material being sent to U.S. military personnel in South Vietnam.

31 March

Calley was sentenced to life imprisonment and hard labor at Fort Leavenworth for his role in the My Lai massacre. The Battle Hymn of Lt. Calley was released by Terry Nelson around this date protesting Calley's innocence.

At Đông Hà Combat Base, Thiệu addressed the survivors of the incursion and claimed that the operation in Laos was "the biggest victory ever".

House Democrats voted 138:62 to call for an end to U.S. involvement in Indochina by the start of 1973.

31 March to 2 April

Following B-52 strikes and tactical airstrikes on the PAVN Base Area 611 in the Laotian Salient, the ARVN Hac Bao Reconnaissance Company of the 1st Division supported by the 2nd Squadron, 17th Air Cavalry was landed in the area. The Hac Bao found 85 PAVN dead and 18 destroyed weapons. That night vehicles were heard moving to the south and airstrikes destroyed five vehicles. On the morning of 1 April the Hac Bao found a destroyed fuel dump and tunnel complex housing armored vehicles before being extracted on the afternoon of 2 April.

31 March to 16 April

The PAVN 66th Regiment attacked Firebase 6 overrunning the base. Lieutenant Brian Thacker team leader of an Integrated Observation System would be awarded the Medal of Honor for his actions during the battle. ARVN reinforcements were flown in and recaptured the base although PAVN units remained in force in the surrounding area. More than 280 PAVN were killed, mostly by airstrikes. The PAVN attacked the base again on 3 April with the ARVN reporting a further 900 PAVN killed and a total of 68 ARVN killed, though sources in Saigon expressed skepticism over these figures. By 11 April approximately 1,000 ARVN were defending the base, opposed by an estimated 7,000 PAVN. The PAVN were pounded with B-52 strikes and BLU-82 Fuel Air Explosive bombs. On 14 April a ground relief force reached the base encountering minimal opposition to lift the siege. On 15 April in a skirmish 1.5 miles (2.4 km) southeast of the base the ARVN killed 38 PAVN for the loss of four killed.

== April ==
3 April

Nixon ordered Calley to be transferred from Fort Leavenworth prison to house arrest.

6 April

The Hac Bao conducted a further raid into the Laotian Salient finding 15 PAVN dead and a destroyed tunnel complex, during the operation USAF airstrikes destroyed three anti-aircraft gun positions. This raid marked the official end of Operation Lam Son 719.

7 April

Khe Sanh Combat Base, reactivated to support Operation Lam Son 719, was abandoned once again.

In a press conference, Nixon claimed that "Tonight I can report that Vietnamization has succeeded." and announced the withdrawal of a further 100,000 troops from South Vietnam between May and November 1971. Senior military planners said that the withdrawals would make 1972 a risky year for U.S. forces as the changing military balance could tempt Hanoi to mount a major offensive to demoralize or topple the South Vietnamese government and undermine the Nixon Administration in a U.S. presidential election year.

The U.S. Table Tennis Association announced that it had accepted a Chinese invitation to send a team to make a ten-day tour of China following the world championships in Nagoya, Japan. This marked the beginning of the U.S.-China Ping-pong diplomacy.

UPI correspondent Kate Webb, Japanese photojournalist Toshiichi Suzuki and Cambodian journalists Tea Kim Heang, Chhim Sarath, Vorn and Charoon were captured by PAVN troops fighting ANK forces on Highway 4.

7 April to 5 June

Operation Xieng Dong was a successful RLA operation to defend the capital Luang Prabang against a PAVN attack. RLA forces from across the country converged on the capital and forced the PAVN 335th Regiment to withdraw.

8-10 April

The PAVN attacked Firebase Lonely (13.44°N 108.089°E) in the Central Highlands, losing 68 killed. They then laid siege to the base losing a further 25 killed for the loss of three ARVN.

8 April to 11 July

Operation Montana Mustang was a 1st Brigade, 5th Infantry Division (Mechanized) operation intended to locate and destroy enemy forces, eliminate VC infrastructure, conduct reaction/exploitation operations and assist in pacification and Vietnamization in Quảng Trị Province. The operation resulted in 91 PAVN and 57 U.S. killed.

14 April

The 3rd Marine Amphibious Brigade was activated at Camp Jay K. Brooks and III Marine Amphibious Force transferred all remaining Marine forces to it.

Nixon announced a relaxation of the 20 year old trade embargo with China, allowing the export of non-strategic goods.

16 April to October

Elements of the ARVN 1st Division commanded by Brigadier General Vũ Văn Giai and a battalion from the U.S. 101st Airborne Division (Airmobile) began Operation Lam Son 720 against PAVN bases in the A Sầu Valley meeting minimal resistance. Abrams stated that a new South Vietnamese incursion into Laos could not be ruled out.

17 April

The South Vietnamese held a victory parade and award ceremony for participants in Lam Son 719 outside the Huế Citadel. Thiệu repeated his "Four nos": no coalition, no neutralization, no territorial concessions and no Communists operating openly in South Vietnam.

18 April

Kỳ stated that it would take 15 to 20 years before South Vietnam was able to defend itself, but that the pace of the U.S. withdrawal was reasonable.

20 April

Lon Nol resigned as President of the Khmer Republic, however he would rescind the resignation a week later and stay on as figurehead leader with Sisowath Sirk Matak exercising power.

The Pentagon stated that 209 Fragging incidents had occurred in South Vietnam in 1970, up from 96 in 1969.

21 April

Testifying before the Senate Foreign Relations Committee, Republican Representative Pete McCloskey said that the Nixon Administration had hidden the extent of U.S. bombing in northern Laos. Democratic Senator Edward Kennedy described the unrestricted air war there as a "bloodbath".

The New York Times published an article on refugees in Indochina which it said numbered five million in South Vietnam, one million in Cambodia and 750,000 in Laos.

22 April

John Kerry of Vietnam Veterans Against the War testified before the Senate Foreign Relations Committee stating: "Someone has to die so that President Nixon won't be - and these are his words - 'the first president to lose a war.' How do you ask a man to be the last man to die in Vietnam? How do you ask a man to be the last man to die for a mistake?"

23-4 April

Members of Vietnam Veterans Against the War threw away over 700 medals on the west steps of the Capitol building in Washington to protest the war in what they called Operation Dewey Canyon III. The next day, antiwar organizers claimed that 500,000 marched, making this the largest demonstration since the November 1969 march, while officials claimed the number was 200,000.

24 April

Seven soldiers from the 11th Infantry Brigade were killed by a VC booby-trap while on patrol 26 miles (42 km) southeast of Quảng Ngai.

26 April

The PAVN attacked the ARVN base at Hoang Anh 15 miles (24 km) northwest of Quảng Ngai killing 22 ARVN, while losing 21 PAVN. Six Americans were killed in two PAVN/VC attacks on a land-clearing unit 20 miles (32 km) northwest of Saigon. A PAVN mortar attack on an ammunition dump near Quy Nhon caused a huge explosion and killed ten ARVN and two civilians and wounded a further 18 civilians. PF forces killed 42 PAVN in clashes 30 miles (48 km) south of Da Nang.

27 April

The Senate Armed Service Committee unveiled proposed legislation limiting the annual draft to 150,000 men for the next two years, more than the Nixon Administration's current draft plans of 10,000 per month.

The South Vietnamese Government ordered Don Luce to leave the country by 16 May. This was in retaliation for his role in revealing the "Tiger cages" on Côn Sơn Island in 1970.

29 April

ANK troops killed 57 PAVN for the loss of 12 killed in an action to relieve ANK forces besieged on the Pich Nil Pass (11.195°N 104.074°E) on Route 4.

The U.S. 1st Cavalry Division (Airmobile) less its 3rd Brigade departed South Vietnam.

29 April to 1 July

The 196th Light Infantry Brigade launched Operation Caroline Hill to locate and engage PAVN/VC forces, lines of communications and base areas and provide security for pacification programs in the area west and south of Da Nang following the departure of the III Marine Amphibious Force. The operation resulted in 161 PAVN/VC killed and 11 captured and U.S. losses of 15 killed.

30 April

Nixon welcomed the 1st Marine Division back from South Vietnam at a ceremony at Camp Pendleton.

I Field Force, Vietnam was disestablished and its assets formed the basis for its successor, the Second Regional Assistance Command (SRAC).

American Forces Vietnam Network was instructed by MACV to stop playing The Battle Hymn of Lt. Calley.

Five Americans were killed when UH-1H #68-16303 was shot down in Operation Lam Son 720 in the A Sầu Valley.

Medal of Honor recipient Dwight H. Johnson was shot dead as he attempted to rob a convenience store in Detroit.

== May ==
1 May

UPI correspondent Kate Webb, missing since 7 April and presumed dead, was released from PAVN captivity in Kampong Speu, Cambodia.

2 May

II Field Force, Vietnam was disestablished with its assets providing the basis for its successor, Third Regional Assistance Command (TRAC).

2-4 May

A reinforced company of VC infantry and sappers stormed Đại Lộc District Headquarters behind a mortar and rocket barrage. RF/PF forces killed 95 VC and captured 43 individual and crew-served weapons, at a cost of 15 dead and 43 wounded.

3 May

15,000 soldiers and police arrested more than 7,000 persons in the 1971 May Day Protests in Washington D.C.

The State Department acknowledged that B-52s had been bombing targets in northern Laos for the past two years.

4 May

North Vietnam effectively rejected a U.S. proposal that U.S. prisoners of war be held in Sweden until a peace settlement was agreed.

5 May

1,146 protesters against the war were arrested on the U.S. Capitol grounds trying to shut down the U.S. Congress. This brought the total arrested during 1971 May Day Protests to over 12,000.

6 May

A PAVN artillery attack on Da Nang killed six civilians and destroyed three houses.

An ARVN mechanized force killed 72 PAVN in fighting near Snuol, Cambodia and U.S. helicopter gunships killed five PAVN 52 miles (84 km) southeast of Phnom Penh.

U.S. negotiators at the Paris Peace Talks said that there could be no discussion of a full withdrawal of U.S. forces unless North Vietnamese forces were also withdrawn. The North Vietnamese continued to deny that it had any troops in South Vietnam, Cambodia or Laos.

8-9 May

A 24-hour truce to mark Buddha's birthday saw 51 ceasefire violations resulting in 43 civilians, 19 PAVN/VC, 11 ARVN and two U.S. killed. 36 of the civilians were killed when a ferry hit a mine in Quảng Trị Province.

11 May

It was reported that FANK artillery had caused severe damage to the Angkor Wat temple complex and killed ten civilians there three months previously. The area had been occupied by the PAVN since June 1970.

Democratic Senator John C. Stennis introduced war powers legislation to limit the power of the President to commit the U.S. to war without congressional approval.

11-15 May

A 5,000 strong ARVN force conducted operations in Kandol Chrum and Kompong Trach, Cambodia killing at least 60 PAVN.

12 May

U.S. jets destroyed 13 PAVN antiaircraft guns around the Mụ Giạ Pass.

In Operation Lam Son 720 the PAVN attacked a South Vietnamese Marine battalion twice, losing more than 200 killed while ARVN casualties were 90 killed and wounded.

13 May

The Paris Peace Talks between North Vietnam, South Vietnam, the VC and the U.S. entered their fourth year. Little or no progress had been made.

15 May

MACV acknowledged that heroin addiction amongst U.S. forces had reached epidemic proportions. It was estimated that 10-25% (24,500 to 60,000) of lower-ranking enlisted men in South Vietnam were heroin users.

15 May - September

Operation Phoutah was an RLA defensive operation against a PAVN strike from Tchepone. The RLA failed in its attempts to capture Moung Phalane.

16 May

The ARVN launched a new operation in the Parrot's Beak region of Cambodia killing 14 PAVN on the first day.

Five U.S. soldiers from the Americal Division were killed when their armored personnel carrier hit a landmine 20 miles (32 km) from Da Nang.

The PAVN fired two SA-2 missiles at a USAF AC-130 gunship operating west of the Ban Karai Pass, both missed.

17 May

The PAVN captured Paksong, the last RLA held position on the Bolaven Plateau.

18 May

The PAVN captured Don Hene, Laos after destroying much of the town in a rocket barrage.

19 May

Former commander of the Americal Division Samuel W. Koster was demoted from major general to brigadier general for his role in covering up the Mỹ Lai massacre.

20 May

A report in The New York Times stated that the U.S. was limiting the tactical and strategic capabilities of the RVNAF on the assumption that the war was winding down. The RVNAF was unable to conduct large airlifts or conduct cross-border interdiction operations necessitating a large ongoing U.S. air presence.

In Operation Lam Son 720 the ARVN reported killing 38 PAVN at the southeastern end of the A Sầu Valley.

21 May

30 U.S. infantrymen, many from Company A, 1st Battalion, 61st Infantry Regiment, were killed when a PAVN 122mm rocket hit their bunker at Charlie 2.

22 May

In Paris, North Vietnamese negotiator Xuân Thủy said the issue of U.S. POWs could be resolved quickly once the U.S. set a date for full withdrawal of its forces.

23 May

Senior U.S. military and civilian pacification advisers reported that the VC in the Mekong Delta were consolidating their position and waiting for the U.S. withdrawal.

24 May

PAVN sappers penetrated Cam Ranh Base and blew up storage tanks containing 1.5 million gallons of aviation fuel.

25 May

Republican Senator Jacob Javits on a visit to Saigon said that South Vietnam would need $2 billion in annual economic and military aid after a U.S. withdrawal.

27 May

Abrams said that a "herculean effort" was required to overcome laxness amongst U.S. forces as they withdrew from South Vietnam. He was reported to have been angered by the deaths of U.S. troops at Fire Base Mary Ann and Charlie 2 which he blamed on a lack of discipline and security precautions.

In Operation Lam Son 720 the ARVN reported killing 47 PAVN just east of the A Sầu Valley for the loss of three ARVN. 26 VC and seven RF/PF were killed in a convoy ambush on Highway 1.

28-9 May

A PAVN battalion attacked ARVN forces near Snuol losing 56 killed. A further PAVN attack resulted in 120 PAVN and eight ARVN killed.

29-30 May

Elements of the 38th Regiment and 91st Sapper Battalion attacked Dai Xuyen District, south of Da Nang, where over 80,000 South Vietnamese civilians, including high government officials, had gathered for a religious ceremony. The battle raged throughout the day and into the following night before the PAVN/VC fell back, leaving behind over 200 dead while Allied losses were five killed. 20 civilians died in the fighting and homes in the area suffered extensive damage.

30 May

Chief of Naval Operations Admiral Elmo R. Zumwalt gave sailors in South Vietnam a 30-day amnesty to seek drug treatment.

Twelve civilians were killed and 11 wounded in a PAVN/VC rocket attack on Da Nang.

31 May

Kissinger in secret peace negotiations with North Vietnam in Paris introduced a new proposal for a U.S. withdrawal from South Vietnam, a ceasefire in place and an exchange of prisoners. The ceasefire in place was a key concession because it would allow PAVN soldiers to remain in South Vietnam at least temporarily.

RF/PF forces supported by armor killed 154 PAVN/VC for the loss of four killed in fighting at Điện Bàn.

The PAVN ejected ARVN forces from Snuol in heavy fighting after PAVN antiaircraft fire and monsoon rains prevented resupply. The ARVN denied they had been routed and claimed to have killed over 700 PAVN during the withdrawal.

A bomb explosion in a government tax building in Saigon killed five civilians and wounded 12.

Only 13 of 570 disabled PAVN/VC prisoners accepted an offer of repatriation to North Vietnam.

1,000 U.S. servicemen based in the United Kingdom held an antiwar protest outside the U.S. Embassy in London.

The Cambodian Government called for peace talks with North Vietnam once North Vietnamese and VC forces left Cambodia. The North Vietnamese negotiators in Paris rejected the proposal as "nonsense" and called for the restoration of Sihanouk.

U.S. Army commanders acknowledged that troops withdrawals had made some base areas more vulnerable but that it had not led to increased vulnerability for troops in the field.

== June ==
2 June

Brigadier General John W. Donaldson was charged with the murder of six Vietnamese civilians during operations in November 1968-January 1969 while flying in his helicopter over Quảng Ngãi Province. A colonel at the time of the alleged crimes, he was the first U.S. general charged with war crimes since 1902 and the highest ranking American to be accused of war crimes during the war. The charges were eventually dismissed due to lack of evidence.

A U.S. helicopter crashed 24 miles (39 km) northwest of Saigon killing seven Americans.

3 June

U.S. aircraft carried out large bombing raids against three PAVN divisions around Snuol.

PAVN mortars hit South Vietnamese Marines at Firebase Fuller killing six while the Marines claimed nine PAVN killed.

A PAVN attack on Firebase 5 southwest of Đắk Tô killed four ARVN.

Hanoi announced that it would not accept the return of disabled POWs even though a ship carrying the 13 PAVN/VC prisoners for the exchange had already set sail. The prisoners were returned to Da Nang.

4 June

ANK forces fought three PAVN/VC regiments for control of the Vihear Suor marshes 15 miles (24 km) east of Phnom Penh with Allied airstrikes killing at least 15 PAVN/VC.

4-5 June

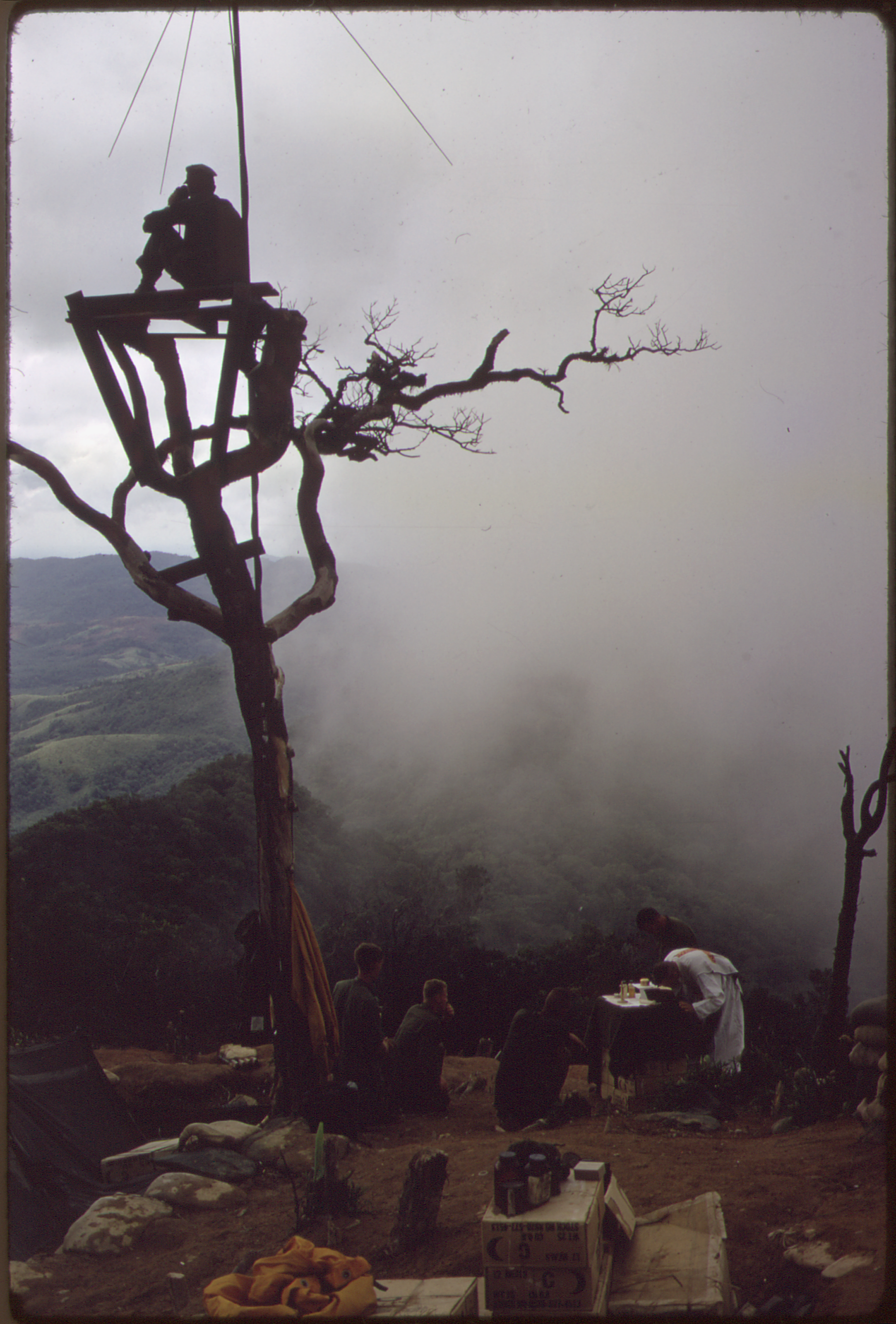
Hill 950 in 1967

The PAVN attack Hill 950, a U.S. Military Assistance Command, Vietnam – Studies and Observations Group (MACV-SOG) operations base and United States Army Security Agency radio relay site overlooking the Khe Sanh plateau. Many of the personnel at the base were evacuated by helicopter, but approximately 22 remained to defend the base and destroy its secret communications system and were either captured or evaded into the surrounding area.

5 June

The CIA identified at least 21 opium refineries in the Golden Triangle that supplied heroin to U.S. forces in South Vietnam.

6 June

In heavy fighting around Khe Sanh, South Vietnamese Marines reported killing 174 PAVN for the loss of ten Marines, with U.S. helicopter gunships accounting for 58 of the PAVN. At 02:00 the PAVN attacked Marines 1.5 miles (2.4 km) northwest of Firebase Sarge losing 83 killed for the loss of two Marines.

A PAVN rocket attack on Da Nang killed seven civilians and three ARVN.

Democratic Senator Stuart Symington said that the U.S. was spending hundreds of millions of dollars on a clandestine war in Laos, while Senator Edward Kennedy accused the Nixon Administration of whitewashing U.S. involvement there.

6-7 June

In the Battle of Long Khánh the 3rd Battalion, Royal Australian Regiment attacked a PAVN/VC base camp in Long Khánh Province. The battle resulted in five VC and three Australians killed.

7 June

U.S. helicopter gunships sank 11 sampans in the Mekong Delta killing 22 VC.

A PAVN rocket attack on Da Nang killed three civilians and wounded ten.

The Pentagon reported that the PAVN were upgrading and expanding their road network in Laos despite the onset of the monsoon which would normally halt construction and repair work.

The State Department acknowledged that the U.S. was financing approximately 4,500 Thai "volunteers" in Laos, saying that it predated a 1970 congressional ban on the use of mercenaries.

7-10 June

A 2,000 strong ARVN Ranger force conducted a sweep of southeastern Cambodia killing 90 PAVN/VC for 11 Rangers killed.

9 June

PAVN forces attacked the U.S. trained 1st and 7th ANK Regiments at Prey Thom in the Vihear Suor marshes 12 miles (19 km) east of Phnom Penh killing more than 80 ANK. PAVN forces captured Sráng 25 miles (40 km) southeast of Phnom Penh, inflicting heavy losses on ANK forces.

ARVN General Nguyễn Văn Hiếu was relieved of command of the 5th Division on the recommendation of Abrams and Nguyễn Văn Minh due to his mishandling of the Battle of Snuol.

The Senate approved 67:11 a draft ceiling of 130,000 for Fiscal Year 1972 and 140,000 for Fiscal Year 1973.

9-11 June

Operation Phiboonpol was an offensive by four RLA battalions to capture the Bolaven Plateau. Faced with strong opposition from the PAVN the RLA only managed to secure a tenuous position on the edge of the plateau after suffering heavy losses.

10 June

The South Vietnamese Ministry of Economy announced that it would open bidding for oil exploration concessions of its continental shelf within the year.

11 June

The Nixon Administration ordered that U.S. forces could no longer participate in reconnaissance missions into Laos, ending MACV-SOG's role in such operations.

The Cambodian Government ordered a news blackout of the fighting in the Vihear Suor marshes with intense fighting and antiaircraft fire reported around the ANK stronghold at Kompong Ampil. Two ANK generals were reported to have flown to Saigon to seek South Vietnamese military assistance.

12 June

Thiệu reshuffled his cabinet ahead of the presidential election later in the year, moving or removing several key allies of his rival Kỳ, most notably Economy Minister Nguyễn Bích Hue.

The Cambodian Government claimed that 350 PAVN/VC had been killed in the Vihear Suor fighting.

PAVN forces supported by tanks overran Ban Nhik and moved to within 17 miles (27 km) of the regional capital, Pakse.

A VC ambush of a convoy on Highway 19 resulted in nine VC, three ARVN and three South Vietnamese construction workers killed.

Eleven civilians were killed and nine wounded when a bus hit a VC land mine on Highway 14.

13 June

The New York Times began publishing the Pentagon Papers.

14-15 June

In fighting near Firebase 5 ARVN Airborne forces killed 92 PAVN for the loss of one killed.

15 June

PAVN ambushed a patrol of the U.S. 3rd Brigade, 1st Cavalry Division near Xuân Lộc District killing four U.S. for the loss of nine PAVN killed.

The Nixon Administration obtained an interim court ruling to stop the publication of the Pentagon Papers.

The Nixon Administration was reported to be conducting a review on how to counter any new PAVN offensive in 1972.

MACV announced that U.S. battalion advisory teams to the ARVN would be phased out within the next two weeks, with advisors now at the regiment level.

ARVN forces killed 11 VC in the Rung Sat Special Zone.

16 June

Twenty PAVN attacked four Khmer National Navy guardposts in Phnom Penh, killing four sailors.

The Senate voted 55:42 to reject the McGovern–Hatfield plan that would have withdrawn all U.S. forces by the end of 1971. The United States Conference of Mayors voted 54:49 to urge Nixon to withdraw all U.S. forces by the end of 1971.

17 June

More than 10,000 ARVN troops conducted security sweeps around Saigon ahead of an Armed Services Day parade on 19 June.

The U.S. and Japan signed a treaty to return Okinawa to Japanese control. Under the treaty U.S. bases on Okinawa could no longer be used for military operations without Japanese government approval.

18 June

Approximately 400 PAVN attacked Firebase Sarge, they were forced back by the 200 Marine defenders with U.S. air support with 95 PAVN and 13 Marines killed.

19 June

At the Armed Forces Day parade in Saigon Thiệu repeated his Four Nos. In Phú Yên Province 18 RF/PF were killed in a VC attack on their outpost, while 155 VC were claimed killed.

20-1 June

B-52s bombed PAVN fortifications, storage areas and infiltration routes on the Khe Sanh plateau and around Firebase Fuller.

22 June

Congress by a 57:42 vote adopted an amendment authored by Senator Mike Mansfield urging the withdrawal of U.S. forces from South Vietnam within nine months of the release of all U.S. POWs. The Nixon Administration said the resolution was non-binding. The amendment was rejected in the House 219:176 in a vote on 28 June.

23 June

The ANK claimed that its forces had overrun the headquarters of the PAVN 272nd Regiment, 9th Division in the Vihear Suor marshes and killed 120 PAVN.

The ARVN killed 31 PAVN at Firebase Fuller while losing eight killed. U.S. helicopter gunships killed a further seven PAVN in the area.

24 June

Private Ken Harding died of wounds becoming the last of 37 New Zealand soldiers to die in the war.

24-8 June

The PAVN overran Firebase Fuller and were then subjected to an intense aerial bombardment before three ARVN battalions were flown in by helicopters of the U.S. 101st Airborne to recapture the area around the base. On 28 June ARVN troops reoccupied the base but it was soon abandoned due to the damage sustained in the fighting. The South Vietnamese claimed that 496 PAVN had been killed at Fuller for the loss of 29 Marines/ARVN.

26 June

The last units of the 3rd Marine Amphibious Brigade left Da Nang.

27 June

North Vietnam negotiators Le Duc Tho and Xuân Thủy responded to Kissinger's 31 May proposal with a nine-point "bargaining proposal". This was the first time that the North Vietnamese had indicated a willingness to negotiate rather than presenting unilateral demands.

Colonel David Hackworth appeared on ABC's Issues and Answers where he strongly criticized U.S. commanders in Vietnam, said the war could not be won, and called for U.S. withdrawal.

MACV reported that at least two PAVN regiments had infiltrated across the DMZ in the preceding weeks for operations before the rainy season began in August. In response the U.S. had increased B-52 missions against infiltration routes.

30 June

The United States Supreme Court ruled 6:3 that The New York Times could resume publication of the Pentagon Papers.

Fighting intensified below the DMZ with the ARVN killing 92 PAVN for the loss of 15 killed near Firebase Gio Linh. ARVN troops engaged PAVN west of Firebase Fuller killing 38 PAVN for the loss of three killed. B-52s and other U.S. jets conducted airstrikes throughout the area in support of the ARVN.

William Colby resigned as head of Civil Operations and Revolutionary Development Support (CORDS) and returned to the U.S.

== July ==
Kissinger made the first of two secret visits to China that paved the way for Richard Nixon's 1972 visit to China. Following this meeting Zhou Enlai travelled to Hanoi to advise the North Vietnamese leadership of the change in Sino-American relations. The North Vietnamese were outraged by this change which they correctly perceived as an attempt by the U.S. to undermine Chinese support for North Vietnam in return for a change in U.S. policy towards Taiwan.

1 July

In Paris the VC offered to return all U.S. POWs if all U.S. forces were withdrawn by the end of 1971 and Vietnamization was halted.

The Twenty-sixth Amendment to the United States Constitution came into effect, lowering the voting age from 21 to 18. The amendment was driven in part by the draft which conscripted men between the ages of 18 and 21.

1 July to 4 October

The ARVN 23rd Division conducted an unnamed operation in Quảng Ngãi Province resulting in 324 PAVN/VC killed.

3 July

Kissinger arrived in Saigon for meetings with senior U.S. and South Vietnamese commanders.

MACV stated that the recent attacks below the DMZ were intended to demoralize South Vietnamese forces. MACV said that most of the airstrikes and helicopter support for ARVN operations were carried out by U.S. forces and that once U.S. forces left the area, airstrikes would become "problematical" and the ARVN would become more reliant on ground transport.

5 July

A PAVN mortar attack on Da Nang Air Base killed three U.S. servicemen.

6-7 July

Typhoon Harriet (Neneng) hit near the DMZ causing significant disruption to military operations on both sides. All U.S. helicopters grounded and ground movement was severely limited. Despite the intensity of the storm, damage was relatively light, with Camp Eagle reporting some roofs blown off from 120 km/h (75 mph) winds. In Da Nang, between 8 and 10 in (200 and 250 mm) of rain fell and strong winds knocked out power to the area. A 24‑hour maximum rainfall of 10.16 in (258 mm) was measured in Camp Evans. Throughout Vietnam, four people were killed and fourteen others were reported missing. Thừa Thiên Province sustained the most significant damage, with 2,500 homes damaged or destroyed.

7 July

In testimony before the House Foreign Affairs subcommittee Republican Representative Robert H. Steele identified II Corps commander Major general Ngô Du and RLA commander Ouane Rattikone as heroin traffickers.

8 July

The U.S. rejected the VC 1 July peace proposal.

8-9 July

The U.S. 1st Brigade, 5th Infantry Division (Mechanized) turned over control of the DMZ to the ARVN 1st Division.

8-15 July

U.S. helicopters transported 1,500 ARVN troops into the Parrot's Beak, Cambodia, meeting minimal opposition. The operation ended on 15 July with no significant contact made.

11 July

U.S. Phantom jets destroyed PAVN antiaircraft guns in the Mụ Giạ Pass in the 46th "protective reaction" strike of the year after the guns fired on U.S. jets bombing the Ho Chi Minh Trail in Laos.

13 July

A USAF court-martial found Captain Thomas S. Culver guilty of participating in 31 May antiwar demonstration in London, in breach of military regulations. He was reprimanded and fined $1,000.

RLA forces with U.S. air support recaptured the Plain of Jars meeting minimal opposition.

14 July

Kỳ accused Thiệu of rigging the vote so that he would win the presidential election.

U.S. forces began land-clearing operations in the Iron Triangle to convert the PAVN/VC base area into farmland.

The ARVN killed 22 PAVN/VC in two actions in Quảng Ngãi Province and killed 19 PAVN/VC in the U Minh forest.

15 July

Nixon announced that he had accepted an invitation to visit China and would do so before May 1972.

The House Government Operations subcommittee disclosed that 26,843 South Vietnamese had been "neutralized" over a 14-month period under the Phoenix Program with 9,820 killed, 7,751 sentenced and 9,161 rallied.

17 July

The Politburo of North Vietnam instructed its negotiators in Paris not to make any further concessions to the United States.

The departure of U.S. forces was reported to be contributing to a decline in population security in the provinces around Saigon. Meanwhile, the departure of the USMC from Da Nang had led to increased unemployment in the area.

19 July

The South Vietnamese Government proposed a ceasefire and reunification of North and South Vietnam through internationally supervised elections.

The North Vietnamese Government accused the U.S. of dividing socialist countries without specifically referring to Nixon's planned visit to China.

Testifying before the House Foreign Operations and Government Information Subcommittee, William Colby acknowledged that the Phoenix Program had resulted in "occasional" political assassinations.

20 July

Thai forces constructed a series of bases along the border in Sayaboury Province, northwestern Laos.

21 July

The U.S. Embassy in Saigon released an assessment of the security situation in South Vietnam showing that the PAVN/VC had made gains in areas evacuated by U.S. forces, particularly Quảng Trị, Quảng Nam and Bình Định provinces and the Mekong Delta.

The Soviet Union implicitly accused the U.S. and China of anti-Soviet maneuvering by republishing a Bulgarian editorial critical of Nixon's planned China visit.

21 July to 9 August

ARVN forces conducted a series of large sweeps of southeastern Cambodia targeting the PAVN 7th Division. A clash on 22 July killed 37 PAVN. A clash on 28 July 9 miles (14 km) southeast of Neak Loeung killed 36 PAVN and six ARVN. A clash on 29 July in the Parrot's Beak killed 72 PAVN. On 2 August the ARVN killed 21 PAVN south of Route 1. On 7 August ARVN forces killed 79 PAVN in two clashes for the loss of 14 killed. On 9 August ARVN forces killed 24 PAVN.

22 July

A U.S. CH-47 crashed in Quảng Tín Province killing 21 ARVN Rangers.

Xuân Thủy accused the U.S. of "perfidious maneuvers" to divide the communist bloc in a "false offensive" for peace in Vietnam. The statement was viewed by U.S. officials as showing that the North Vietnamese had been rattled by the announcement of Nixon's China visit.

23 July

PAVN/VC sappers attacked the command post of the ARVN 18th Division near Tây Ninh, killing four ARVN for the loss of two PAVN/VC. In the Mekong Delta, VC attacked an ARVN outpost killing seven RF/PF.

25 July

The U.S. Embassy reported "serious concern" regarding the welfare of children fathered by U.S. servicemen, particularly Black servicemen. The Embassy estimated that the number of children in South Vietnamese orphanages was between 350 and 400, while the South Vietnamese Ministry of Social Welfare estimated that a further 10–15,000 mixed race children were living with their families.

26 July

Kissinger announced that the United States was prepared to provide $7.5 billion in aid to Vietnam, of which $2.5 billion could go to North Vietnam, and to withdraw all American forces within nine months.

The court-martial began of Captain Ernest Medina for his role in the Mỹ Lai massacre.

The New York Times reported that U.S. analysts believed that China would have limited ability to push North Vietnam towards a peace agreement.

26 July - 31 October

Operation Sayasila was an RLA operation to capture Salavan and Paksong. The RLA succeeded at heavy cost with eight battalions rendered combat ineffective.

28 July

A PAVN/VC sapper attack on Lai Khê destroyed four U.S. helicopters and damaged a fifth.

The South Vietnamese Government announced the resumption of a controversial plan to resettle Montagnard people away from PAVN/VC-controlled areas in the Central Highlands. The U.S. opposed the plan.

The Nixon Administration announced the suspension of manned and unmanned reconnaissance flights over China to avoid any incidents before Nixon's visit to China.

It was announced that U.S., South Vietnamese and Thai narcotics agents had seized heroin and opium worth $4m in raids in Saigon and on the Gulf of Thailand.

U.S. Ambassador to South Korea William J. Porter was named to succeed David K. E. Bruce as head of the U.S. delegation at the Paris Peace Talks after Bruce resigned due to ill-heath.

30 July

The PAVN attacked a Ranger camp 30 miles (48 km) south of Pleiku resulting in 40 PAVN and three Rangers killed. A PAVN rocket attack on an ARVN base 9 miles (14 km) southwest of Da Nang killed Colonel Edward J. Cavanaugh who was visiting the base.

31 July

The VC said they would provide a list of all U.S. POWs as soon as the U.S. set a firm date for withdrawal of all its forces.

PAVN forces ambushed an Americal Division patrol south of Da Nang killing three U.S.. Meanwhile, U.S. helicopter gunships operating in the area killed 30 PAVN/VC.

== August ==
1 August

The U.S. and South Vietnam announced bounties of up to $11,000 for information leading to the capture of key VC leaders.

2 August

The U.S. announced its support for China joining the United Nations but opposed the ousting of Taiwan.

The Nixon Administration acknowledged that the CIA was maintaining a 30,000 man irregular force of the RLA in Laos. The report also described Chinese road construction around Muong Sai and the buildup of antiaircraft artillery in northern Laos, making the area one of the most highly defended places in the world.

3 August

International Voluntary Services announced that it would end its 15-year presence in South Vietnam by the end of August as its funding from the U.S. Government was withdrawn.

The New York Times reported increased drug use among South Vietnamese youths.

4 August

The court-martial began of Colonel Oran Henderson for his role in the Mỹ Lai massacre.

5 August - 21 September

Operation Phou Khao Kham was an RLA operation to clear PAVN/Pathet Lao forces from Routes 13 and 7 north of Vientiane and capture Muang Soui. The RLA succeeded in recapturing Muang Soui but fails to clear the approach routes.

6 August

The 4th Battalion, 503rd Infantry Regiment, the last remaining unit of the 173rd Airborne Brigade redeployed from South Vietnam. The 173rd Airborne Brigade was the first U.S. Army combat unit to deploy to the war.

7 August

ANK forces recaptured the town of Prey Kry after an 11-day battle.

9 August

U.S. jets attacked PAVN antiaircraft guns in North Vietnam in the 48th "protective reaction" strike of the year. ARVN forces killed 48 PAVN/VC in four separate clashes in South Vietnam, losing four killed.

11 August

Marine Sergeant Jon M. Sweeney was found not guilty of desertion and aiding the enemy at his court-martial. Sweeney was captured in South Vietnam and held in the North for 18 months before being released in August 1970. While captive he had made propaganda broadcasts for the North.

12 August

ARVN General Duong Van Minh submitted evidence to the U.S. Embassy that Thiệu was rigging the presidential election scheduled for October.

PAVN attacked Cam Lộ District headquarters killing ten ARVN while also losing ten killed.

14 August

PAVN artillery and rocket fire hit eight ARVN bases just south of the DMZ and antiaircraft fire shot down a U.S. UH-1 6 miles (9.7 km) northwest of Cam Lộ killing seven Americans on board.

15 August

PAVN attacked Firebase Sarge losing 29 killed for the loss of four Marines. After four days of attacks on South Vietnamese bases below the DMZ, the U.S. warned the North Vietnamese that it would retaliate against PAVN positions north of the DMZ.

The Cambodian Government announced that it was negotiating with South Vietnam to assume control of Neak Loeung from South Vietnamese forces. The Cambodians were said to be keen to assert authority in the area amid reports of atrocities conducted by the South Vietnamese.

In order to counter inflation Nixon ordered a 90-day wage-price freeze and announced that the U.S. would end international convertibility of the U.S. dollar to gold in what became known as the Nixon shock.

16 August

PAVN overran Baho, a Vietnamese Marine position 4 miles (6.4 km) from Firebase Sarge and 9 miles (14 km) south of the DMZ. An estimated 200 PAVN were killed in the attack, while Marine losses were described as heavy. In response the U.S. moved heavy artillery units to Mai Loc Camp to support South Vietnamese forces.

17 August

The U.S. Embassy informed Washington that if Thiệu persisted in his efforts to make the upcoming presidential election a charade, it might cause "growing political instability in South Vietnam."

VC sappers sank the SS Green Bay at port in Qui Nhơn, it was the largest merchant ship sunk during the war and ultimately had to be scrapped.

The USAF acknowledged that B-52s had been carrying out raids in the southern half of the DMZ.

17-8 August

An ARVN battalion from the 2nd Regiment, 1st Division engaged a PAVN battalion 2 miles (3.2 km) southwest of Camp Carroll, killing 142 PAVN for the loss of 22 ARVN. Meanwhile, the PAVN continued to bombard Firebases Fuller and Sarge causing ARVN losses of five killed, while nine PAVN were killed. U.S. jets, including B-52s provided air support to the ARVN.

18 August

Australia and New Zealand announced that they would withdraw their combat forces from South Vietnam.

19 August

The U.S. Navy acknowledged that its ships were firing into the southern half of the DMZ. The Vietnamese Marines killed 11 PAVN in an ambush near Firebase Sarge.

20 August

Minh withdrew as a candidate for president in the upcoming presidential election in South Vietnam. Minh said "I cannot put up with a disgusting farce that strips away all the people's hope of a democratic regime."

Calley's life sentence for his role in the My Lai massacre was reduced to 20 years. Calley served three and one-half years of his sentence before being paroled.

20 August - 3 December

Operation Chenla II was a major FANK military operation. The FANK failed to dislodge the PAVN/VC from Cambodian territory and suffered heavy casualties.

21 August

The South Vietnamese withdrew all artillery and most of the Marines from Firebase Sarge, leaving only approximately 200 Marines at the base.

MACV ordered U.S. observation helicopters away from the DMZ after intense PAVN antiaircraft fire shot down four helicopters.

22 August

The Federal Bureau of Investigation foiled attacks by members of the Catholic Left on two draft offices in Camden, New Jersey and Buffalo, New York, arresting 25 people.

U.S. jets carried out the 51st "protective reaction" strike of the year against a SAM site 9 miles (14 km) from the Laos border which had been tracking a U.S. Navy jet.

23 August

Kỳ withdrew his candidacy for president in the upcoming election. Incumbent Thiệu was the only candidate remaining in the election.

ANK forces killed 60 PAVN on Route 6 60 miles (97 km) from Phnom Penh.

24 August

ARVN infantry found 76 PAVN dead during a bomb damage assessment after a B-52 strike 15 miles (24 km) south of the DMZ. An ARVN armored unit engaged a PAVN force 1 mile (1.6 km) outside a firebase near the DMZ, killing 37 for the loss of four killed.

U.S. forces were placed on alert ahead of possible attacks before the South Vietnamese ahead of lower house elections on 29 August.

25 August

A PAVN/VC sapper attack on the Cam Ranh Base tri-service ammunition storage area destroyed over 6000 tons of munitions with a value of more than US$10 million. This was part of a surge of attacks across South Vietnam ahead of the South Vietnamese elections.

The 173rd Airborne Brigade redeployed from South Vietnam, it was the longest continuously serving allied military unit of the war.

26 August

ARVN forces killed 46 PAVN/VC in a sweep 35 miles (56 km) south of Da Nang. Five civilians were killed and 11 homes destroyed when PAVN/VC shelled Tanlap on the southern outskirts of Da Nang.

27 August

The 1st Brigade, 5th Infantry Division (Mechanized) redeployed from South Vietnam.

Five Americal Division soldiers were killed during an attack on their night defensive position 16 miles (26 km) south-southwest of Da Nang.

In fighting on the DMZ 15 PAVN and two ARVN were killed.

29 August

The South Vietnamese lower house elections took place with Thiệu retaining a majority, despite gains by opposition groups particularly in Da Nang.

30 August

The New York Times reported that despite anti-narcotics programs, heroin remained widely available to U.S. servicemen.

MACV and South Vietnamese command reported that the PAVN/VC had conducted 96 artillery attacks on the 29th and 30th in attempts to disrupt elections, killing 41 South Vietnamese soldiers and eight civilians, while 347 PAVN/VC were killed.

31 August

PAVN/VC attacks tapered off but three soldiers of the Americal Division were killed in two ambushes south of Da Nang. On Phú Quốc eight ARVN MPs and nine ARVN/VC POWs were killed in an apparent attempt to free prisoners from the Phú Quốc Prison.

== September ==
3 September

ANK forces claimed to have killed more than 100 soldiers of the PAVN 205th Regiment 65 miles (105 km) northeast of Phnom Penh.

4 September

The New York Times reported on the worsening morale and discipline within the U.S. Army.

5 September 1970 - 8 October 1971

Operation Jefferson Glenn was the last major ground operation in which U.S. troops participated in the Vietnam War. Three battalions of the 101st Airborne Division patrolled the area west of the city of Huế, called the "rocket belt", to try to prevent PAVN/VC rocket attacks. The Americans were gradually replaced by ARVN forces. The Americans and South Vietnamese claimed to have inflicted 2,026 casualties on the PAVN/VC.

6 September

The New York Times reported that South Vietnamese forces were resorting to murder, looting and highway robbery in response to low pay and inactivity.

6-25 September

Operation Lam Son 810 was conducted by the ARVN 1st Division in northwestern Quảng Trị Province, with U.S. air support. The operation resulted in 175 PAVN and 75 ARVN killed.

7 September

Saigon offered food and $50,000 to Hanoi in response to severe flooding in the Hanoi area.

10 September

24 ANK troops were killed in two separate PAVN attacks northwest of Phnom Penh.

13 September

Lin Biao, China's Minister of National Defense and Mao Zedong's designated successor was killed with his family in an aircraft crash after a botched coup against Mao.

14 September

A U.S. serviceman shot and killed a 16 year old South Vietnamese who tried to steal his watch and wounded a 14 year old in Huế, sparking anti-U.S. demonstrations in the city.

Senator George McGovern on a visit to Saigon was trapped by rioters in a Saigon church and had to be rescued by South Vietnamese police and U.S. Military Police.

14-21 September

The ARVN conducted an operation against PAVN/VC bases in the U Minh Forest. The operation resulted in more than 400 PAVN/VC and 113 ARVN killed. Eleven U.S. helicopters supporting the operation were shot down, with four shot down in the initial assault.

15 September

A bomb exploded in the Tu Do Nightclub in Saigon killing 14 Vietnamese and one American and wounding 57 others.

A South Vietnamese student group called the Movement Struggling for the People's Right to Life claimed to have burnt 32 U.S. vehicles since 23 August in an effort to force all Americans to leave South Vietnam immediately.

15-6 September

RLA forces recaptured Paksong on the Bolaven Plateau. PAVN/Pathet Lao losses were 279 killed while RLA losses were 302 killed and 195 missing.

16 September

Thiệu stated that he saw no real chance for peace until after a major battle with the North, which he predicted would take place in 1973.

PAVN/VC ambushed a 75-man ARVN patrol on Route 14 in the Michelin Rubber Plantation killing 15 ARVN and three U.S. advisers for the loss of eight PAVN/VC killed.

20 September

PAVN artillery and rockets hit oil storage tanks in Phnom Penh starting large fires that destroyed 40% of Cambodia's civilian fuel supplies.

The New York Times reported on the expanded U.S. military support presence in Cambodia with a 50-man Military Equipment Delivery Team commanded by Brigadier general Theodore C. Mataxis. Diplomats within the U.S. Embassy were said to be unsuccessful in their attempts to limit the military's influence.

Approximately 600 PAVN attacked Tây Ninh Combat Base with 52 PAVN killed and seven captured, ARVN losses were 21 killed.

21 September

In the Battle of Nui Le the 4RAR/NZ (ANZAC) Battalion engaged PAVN/VC forces at Núi Lé, Chau Duc District. The battle resulted in 14 PAVN/VC and five Australians killed.

U.S. jets flew more than 200 sorties over eight hours attacking PAVN positions up to 35 miles (56 km) north of the DMZ in response to the increased threat from PAVN artillery fire into South Vietnam and antiaircraft and SAM fire against U.S. aircraft.

The U.S. Senate voted 55:30 to approve the Selective Service Bill, allowing the Nixon Administration to continue the draft until June 1973.

22 September

Captain Ernest Medina was acquitted of all charges relating to the Mỹ Lai massacre.

23 September

The Cambodian Government reported that 11 soldiers and 19 civilians had been killed in PAVN attacks on two villages near Prasat, 60 miles (97 km) southeast of Phnom Penh, 29 PAVN were reported killed.

The North Vietnamese delegation refused to attend the Paris Peace Talks in response to the U.S. bombing raids of 21 September.

U.S. officials warned Saigon's generals that any coup d'état against Thiệu due to the crisis over the coming presidential election would lead to an immediate end to U.S. aid.

25 September

U.S. deputy assistant for National Security Affairs Brigadier general Alexander Haig met with Thiệu and Kỳ, reportedly to try to end the crisis surrounding the presidential election and address growing anti-Americanism.

26 September

Marine Security Guard Sergeant Charles "Wayne" Turberville was one of two Americans killed in a Khmer Rouge grenade attack in Phnom Penh.

26-9 September

PAVN forces conducted rocket and sapper attacks against South Vietnamese and ANK forces near Krek and ten South Vietnamese bases and the U.S. Firebase Pace all near the Cambodian border. 230 PAVN and 27 ARVN were killed in the attacks.

28 September

Nixon attended the second annual meeting of the National League of Families of American Prisoners and Missing in Southeast Asia and assured them that the U.S. would "eventually succeed" in securing their release.

China and North Vietnam signed a new aid treaty providing for increased economic assistance to the North.

29 September

The ARVN began an operation to reopen Route 22 between Tây Ninh and Krek. U.S. forces took over ARVN positions near the border to allow ARVN units to advance into Cambodia.

30 September

The U.S. Senate voted 57:38 to approve an amendment proposed by Mike Mansfield calling for a full withdrawal within six months of the release of all U.S. POWs.

September - 22 June 1972

Operation Sourisak Montry VIII was a Thai offensive against Pathet Lao forces along the Mekong River near Xieng Lom, Laos. The operation was indecisive with the Pathet Lao retaining control of the area.

== October ==
1 October

Kỳ attending an anti-Thiệu rally called for a boycott of the vote.

2 October

ARVN forces relieved Firebase Tran Hung Dao which had been under siege by the PAVN for five days, while the PAVN continued to besiege Firebase Alpha 5 miles (8.0 km) east of Krek.

In fighting near Kien Thien in the Mekong Delta, 18 ARVN and 16 PAVN were killed.

3 October

The 1971 South Vietnamese presidential election was held. Incumbent President Thiệu garnered 94.3 percent of the vote. All of Thiệu's opponents had dropped out of the race.

PAVN rockets fired into Saigon killed three civilians and wounded five. 34 other standoff attacks took place across South Vietnam ahead of the presidential election.

Soviet head of state Nikolai Podgorny on a visit to Hanoi pledged ongoing Soviet support for the North's war effort.

6 October

The ARVN claimed that the PAVN were retreating in southwestern Cambodia with the PAVN 141st and 209th Regiments, 7th Division and the 174th Regiment, 5th Division having lost over 450 soldiers in the recent fighting.

7 October

At the UN, Cambodian Foreign Minister Koun Wick called for the area around Angkor Wat to be declared a demilitarized zone, to prevent further destruction to the temples there.

8-9 October

ARVN reported killing 50 PAVN in fighting between Krek and Firebase Alpha. An ARVN force of 1,200 Rangers supported by armor relieved Firebase Alpha on the 9th killing 97 PAVN for the loss of one killed.

8-11 October

The VC released U.S. Sergeant John C. Sexton Jr. in Cambodia, he had been captured on 12 August 1969. In exchange the South Vietnamese released a PAVN lieutenant. Sexton was the 31st POW released by the PAVN/VC.

9 October

Five U.S. soldiers at Firebase Pace near the Cambodian border refused to undertake a patrol outside the perimeter of the firebase. The combat refusal was widely reported by the media as was a letter signed by 65 American soldiers at Firebase Pace to Senator Edward Kennedy protesting that they were being ordered to participate in offensive combat operations despite U.S. policy to the contrary.

10 October

ARVN forces killed 46 PAVN for the loss of seven ARVN in fighting on Route 1 7 miles (11 km) northeast of Kompong Trabek, Cambodia.

12 October

The New York Times reported that the Joint Chiefs had provided Laird with a draft pacification plan for Cambodia which would see military aid there increase to $500m per year by 1977.

South Vietnamese war veterans captured an Americal Division convoy on Route 2, 9 miles (14 km) south of Da Nang after one of the U.S. vehicles crashed into a funeral procession vehicle. The convoy with 14 U.S. soldiers onboard was held for eight hours until a ransom of $720 and foodstuffs was paid to the veterans in "an expression of sorrow".

13 October

PAVN/VC sappers destroyed two U.S. helicopters at Dĩ An Base Camp. A U.S. AH-1 Cobra gunship was shot down near Firebase Pace.

14 October

An ARVN armored task force clashed with PAVN forces near Krek killing 52 PAVN for the loss of five killed. Meanwhile, the PAVN/VC bombardment of Firebase Pace continued for its 19th consecutive day.

15 October

Governor Ronald Reagan on a stopover in Saigon met with Thiệu and praised his reelection as a "referendum" saying "I am unable to understand why so many people in our country, especially the communications media, are so charged up by this one-man election."

16 October

Lon Nol suspended the Cambodian national assembly and announced that he would rule by executive decree.

In his memoirs published in The New York Times, former President Lyndon Johnson described U.S. support for the 1963 South Vietnamese coup that overthrew Ngo Dinh Diem as a "serious blunder" that created political chaos in South Vietnam which became the principal factor in Johnson committing U.S. ground forces to the war.

19 October

In fighting near Thien Ngon on the Cambodian border, ARVN Airborne forces killed 29 PAVN for the loss of seven killed. Meanwhile, in two actions near Xuân Lộc VC killed 12 ARVN for the loss of 11 killed.

20 October

A USAF A-37 jet accidentally bombed ARVN forces near Thien Ngon killing 18 ARVN. In fighting in the U Minh Forest the ARVN killed 60 PAVN/VC for the loss of five killed.

Lon Nol declared a state of emergency in Cambodia and said that he would run the country by "ordinance". He said that he would no longer "play the game of democracy and freedom" as this was hindering the Cambodian government's fight against the communist forces.

22 October

U.S. forces withdrew from Firebase Pace, leaving the base and its four guns to an ARVN Airborne battalion which took over the base. In four separate actions around Pace the ARVN reported killing 47 PAVN.

23 October

In two actions along the Cambodian border ARVN Rangers killed 23 PAVN. ARVN troops found the bodies of 53 PAVN killed by airstrikes 3 miles (4.8 km) south of Firebase Pace.

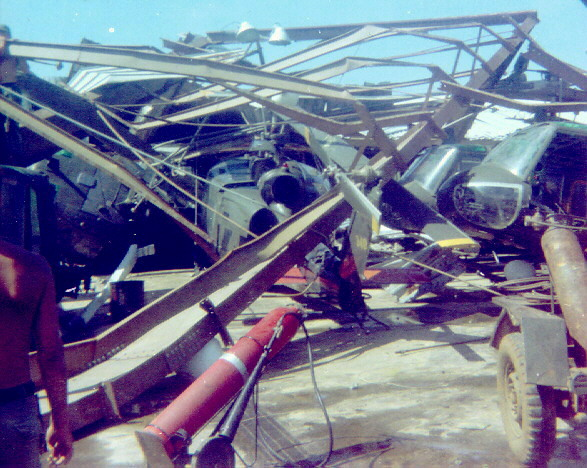
Damaged hangar of the 174th Assault Helicopter Company at Chu Lai

23-5 October

Typhoon Hester made landfall over South Vietnam causing severe damage. At Chu Lai Base Area, Hester damaged or destroyed 75 percent of the structures in the base. Sustained winds and gusts in the base were estimated to have reached 130 km/h (80 mph) and 160 km/h (105 mph) respectively. Four hangars collapsed in the Chu Lai Air Base, with total aircraft losses amounting to 36 destroyed and 87 damaged. The 91st Evacuation Hospital was mostly destroyed and was forced to transfer patients to Qui Nhơn. Nearly 50 percent of the structures at the Marble Mountain Air Facility were damaged by the storm's high winds. Heavy rains accompanying the storm caused considerable flooding in the country, approximately 370 km (230 mi) of coastline between Quảng Trị and Da Nang were inundated. About 90 percent of homes in Da Nang were damaged. Twenty-two people were killed when an RVNAF C-47 transport crashed 5 miles (8.0 km) west Qui Nhơn. Thee Americans were killed due to flying debris during the storm and twenty-one others were injured. On 25 October, thunderstorms associated with Hester were blamed for a CH-47 crash near Nha Trang that killed 10 Americans.

24 October

In his memoirs Johnson stated that he regretted not saying more about Vietnam in his 17 January 1968 State of the Union address, saying "I did not go into details concerning the build-up of enemy forces or warn of the early major combat I believed was in the offing...This was one of those delicate situations in which we had to try to inform our own people without alerting the enemy to our knowledge of its plans. In retrospect, I think I was too cautious. If I had forecast the possibilities, the American people would have been better prepared for what was to come."

26 October

The United Nations General Assembly voted 76:35 to seat China and expel Taiwan in a diplomatic defeat for the U.S.

In two actions in the Mekong Delta ARVN forces killed 23 PAVN/VC.

PAVN/VC ambushed a convoy 50 miles (80 km) northeast of Saigon killing 18 ARVN and one American for the loss of one killed.

300 antiwar protestors were arrested after sitting down in Pennsylvania Avenue, Washington D.C. in the evening rush-hour.

27-9 October

PAVN frogmen destroyed a bridge used to supply ANK forces northeast of Phnom Penh and besiege the ANK garrisons at Kompong Thom and Rumlong killing approximately 400 ANK soldiers.

28 October

The U.S. Senate voted 47:44 to reject the Cooper-Church amendment that would have restricted the administration to only using funds to withdraw U.S. forces from Indochina.

31 October

Thiệu was inaugurated for a new term as president, to mark the occasion the South Vietnamese amnestied 2,938 low-ranking VC POWs.

A VC battalion attacked an ARVN position 40 miles (64 km) northwest of Saigon killing ten ARVN for the loss of 31 VC.

== November ==
1-9 November

Operation Bedrock was an RLA offensive against the PAVN 46th Battalion near Salavan. The operation succeeded in securing the rice growing area near Salavan.

2 November

A U.S. Senate sub-committee issued a 300-page report "corruption, criminality, and moral compromise" at U.S. Post Exchanges in South Vietnam.

ANK forces relieved Prakham which had been under siege by the PAVN for a week, killing 291 PAVN.

A U.S. Navy jet attacked a PAVN antiaircraft site in North Vietnam in the 70th "protective reaction" strike of the year. U.S. helicopter gunships killed 24 PAVN/VC in the Mekong Delta.

4 November

MACV announced that two Americans had been killed in action in the previous week, the lowest death toll since U.S. combat forces were first deployed in 1965.

5 November

VC ambushed an RF/PF company on the Cà Mau peninsula killing 17.

The U.S. State Department said that the Senate's proposed cuts to U.S. aid would cripple the South Vietnamese economy and undermine Cambodia's ability to defend itself.

6 November

Laird concluded a three-day visit to South Vietnam and indicated that the U.S. was ready to accelerate troop withdrawals. The New York Times reported that both the U.S. military and civil advisory effort in South Vietnam was winding down.

7 November

A report by Cornell University showed that while the Nixon Administration had reduced ground combat in South Vietnam it had maintained the use of air power in South Vietnam and increased it in Cambodia and Laos.

7-8 November

PAVN forces killed 10 ANK soldiers at Bamnal, 70 miles (110 km) northwest of Phnom Penh.

9 November

U.S. jets attacked Quang Lang Air Base in their deepest strike in North Vietnam of the year and also attacked antiaircraft positions around Vinh in the 73rd "protective reaction" strike of the year.

10 November

Professor Nguyen Van Bong, leader of the Progressive Nationalist Movement and an aide were killed in a grenade attack on their car in Saigon.

The PAVN conducted a rocket and sapper attack on Pochentong Airport in Phnom Penh killing 19 people and destroying two Khmer Air Force helicopters. A communications facility nearby was also hit and put out of service for several hours.

A U.S. helicopter crashed 17 miles (27 km) east of Saigon killing five Americans and one South Vietnamese.

11 November

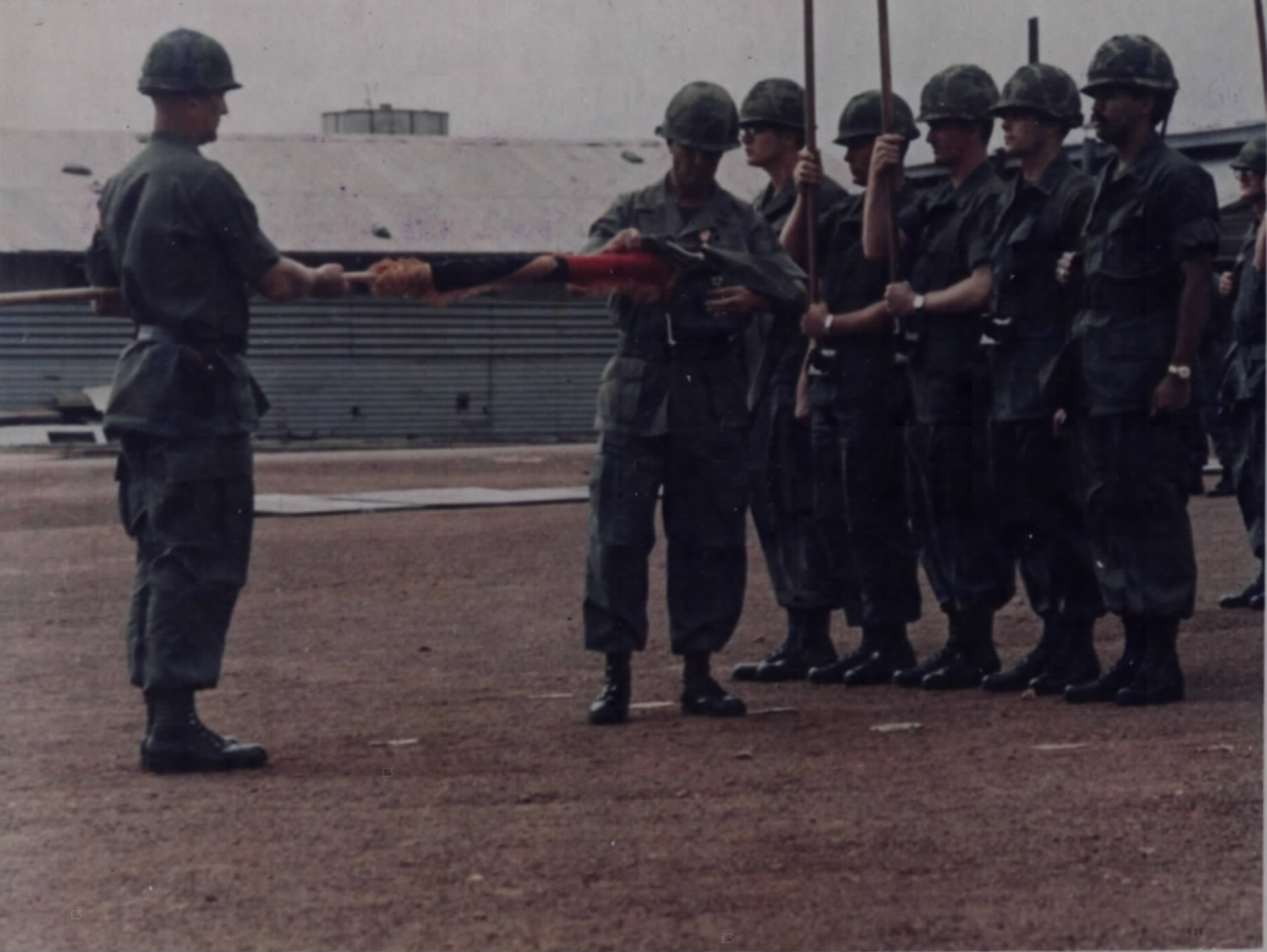
MG Frederick J. Kroesen, Jr., holds the 23rd Infantry Division (Americal) colors as they are cased, Chu Lai Base Area, 11 November 1971

The Americal Division was inactivated in a ceremony at Chu Lai Base Area. The Division's 196th Light Infantry Brigade was reconstituted as a separate brigade and remained in South Vietnam.

12 November

Nixon announced that a further 45,000 U.S. troops would be withdrawn from South Vietnam by 1 February 1972 and that "American troops are now in a defensive position...the offensive activities of search and destroy are now being undertaken by the South Vietnamese"

13 November

MACV reported that North Vietnam was massing supplies near the Ban Karai and Mụ Giạ Passes in preparation for a major offensive in 1972. Nixon warned the North that increased infiltration would lead to increased U.S. bombing.

ANK forces abandoned Rumlong 52 miles (84 km) northeast of Phnom Penh after a 19-day siege by the PAVN with only 30 of the 1,000 man garrison making it back to ANK lines.

The ARVN repelled a PAVN attack of a firebase near Pleiku killing 163 PAVN for the loss of 29 ARVN.

15 November

Thiệu outlined an economic reform program that included devaluation of the South Vietnamese đồng. Saigon food prices rose 50% as a result of the devaluation of the đồng.

Ernest Medina, testifying at the trial of Oran Henderson, said that he had lied to Henderson about the civilian death toll at Mỹ Lai and had "not been completely candid" in sworn statements to Army investigators.

16 November

Two U.S. helicopters collided 70 miles (110 km) northwest of Saigon killing all four crewmen, while another helicopter crashed 21 miles (34 km) west of Saigon killing three ARVN.

The New York Times reported on the poor conditions in South Vietnam's largest military hospital at Cong Hoa in Saigon with 1,800 beds for nearly 4,000 patients and weekly average casualties in October of 764.

16-8 November

U.S. helicopter gunships flew attack missions in support of ANK forces trying to regain Tuol Leap 10 miles (16 km) southwest of Phnom Penh which had been captured by the PAVN and USAF airstrikes increased across the country in support of the ANK.

17 November

Prime Minister of Thailand Thanom Kittikachorn seized complete power and imposed martial law. He pledged ongoing support for U.S. policy in Indochina.

19 November

The American Bishops of the Roman Catholic Church passed a resolution calling for an end to the war "with no further delay".

Cambodian officials flew to Saigon to request the dispatch of ARVN engineers and artillery forces to relieve a 20,000 man ANK task force that had been cut off on Route 6 northeast of Phnom Penh.

20 November

A VPAF MiG fired a missile at a cell of B-52s attacking the Ban Karai Pass.

21 November

Operation Thao La was an RLA dry season offensive to capture the Bolaven Plateau. The RLA secured Tha Theng and Ban Phong but lost Salavan and Paksong. The operation resulted in 1,204 PAVN and 399 RLA killed.

22 November

U.S. Navy jets attacked antiaircraft positions near Vinh in the 80th "protective reaction" strike of the year.

22 November to 30 December

Approximately 25,000 ARVN and 2,500 ANK conduct operations against PAVN forces near Chup initially meeting minimal resistance, while killing 36 PAVN on the first day. The PAVN 5th and 7th Divisions withdrew further into Cambodia to avoid the slow ARVN attack. The operation resulted in 1,336 PAVN and 86 ARVN killed, most of the PAVN casualties resulted from airstrikes.

23 November

As U.S. forces continued to leave South Vietnam it was reported that a major Northern offensive was expected in early 1972 as the PAVN built up its forces north of the DMZ.

28 November

A US Army CH-47 carrying five crew and 28 soldiers from the 327th Infantry Regiment on a flight from Da Nang to Phu Bai Combat Base crashed into high ground killing all on board.

The U.S. Navy announced that the United States Navy SEALs had ended their combat role in the war and would be withdrawn in the next month. The SEALs had been kept in South Vietnam as a contingency force for Bright Light POW recovery operations.

30 November

86 PAVN were killed in fighting northwest of Kontum and two U.S. observation helicopters were shot down in the fighting.

== December ==
1-2 December

The PAVN renewed its attacks north and northeast of Phnom Penh forcing ANK units to withdraw from Baray and Kompong Thmar.

2 December

ANK forces trying to reopen Route 6 were routed by the PAVN with approximately 10,000 ANK troops fleeing in disarray leaving 25 miles (40 km) of Route 6 under PAVN control.

Two U.S. helicopters collided while returning from an operation in the U Minh Forest killing four Americans.

3 December

PAVN forces attacked an RF/PF unit 48 miles (77 km) northwest of Saigon killing 24 while losing 32 PAVN.

The VC announced that they would observe three day ceasefires for Christmas and New Year and a four-day truce for Tết.

RVNAF UH-1 transports and helicopter gunships began flying support missions to the ANK forces under siege on Route 6.

4 December

A General Accounting Office report largely attributed the growing refugee problem in Cambodia to U.S. bombing.

The South Korean 2nd Marine Brigade departed South Vietnam.

4-6 December

The PAVN attacked Bat Doeng 16 miles (26 km) northwest of Phnom Penh killing approximately 50 ANK troops.

5 December

The USAF turned over Phù Cát Air Base to the RVNAF.

6 December

ANK forces abandoned Bat Doeng and withdrew to a nearby base.

PAVN forces captured Saravane on the Boloven Plateau.

The South Vietnamese government began a program to close girlie-bars that had catered to U.S. servicemen in central Saigon.

7 December - May 1973

The Vinh wiretap was a CIA espionage operation to intercept North Vietnamese military telephone lines.

8 December

PAVN forces from the 52nd Regiment attacked the hamlets of Srei Ngei and Kleah Sanday on Route south of Phnom Penh. The PAVN also attacked Phnombaset 8 miles (13 km) northwest of Phnom Penh and the Kambal training center 10 miles (16 km) west of the city.

The main body of the 4th Battalion, Royal Australian Regiment departed South Vietnam, ending Australia's combat participation in the war.

9 December

The 138th session of the Paris Peace Talks ended without the parties agreeing the next meeting date.

11 December

A USAF F-105G escorting a B-52 mission over Laos was shot down by a SAM near the Mụ Giạ Pass.

ARVN units killed 127 PAVN for the loss of 22 ARVN in fighting near Dam Be, Cambodia in the largest battle of its latest Cambodian operation. 200 civilians were reported killed in Suong in a misguided airstrike.

ANK forces abandoned Phnombaset after the hill position was encircled by PAVN forces.

13-14 December

ARVN Airborne and Rangers supported by armor began an offensive to capture the Chup rubber plantation, a base area for the PAVN 7th and 9th Divisions. ARVN and ANK forces captured Chup on the 14th after PAVN forces abandoned the area.

14 December

ANK forces fought with PAVN at Taing Kauk, 48 miles (77 km) north of Phnom Penh.

A U.S. Army U-21 #67-18041 with six Americans onboard disappeared on a flight between Phu Bai and Da Nang, the wreckage was later found in Da Nang Bay.

16 December

A USAF F-4 was hit by antiaircraft fire while bombing Phnom Baset and attempted to make an emergency landing at Pochentong Airport, but the crew was forced to eject on approach.

PAVN forces attacked the ANK at Taing Kauk and Prakham north-northeast of Phnom Penh.

Secretary of the Air Force Robert Seamans said that reconnaissance showed a buildup of trucks in Hanoi and Haiphong indicated a coming PAVN offensive. He also provided statistics to counter the charge that the air war in Indochina was expanding.

17 December

Oran Henderson was acquitted on all charges relating to his role in the Mỹ Lai massacre.

The ARVN withdrew from Chup and Suong.

PAVN forces attacked Vihta Suor 10 miles (16 km) north of Phnom Penh while continuing their attacks on Taing Kauk and Prakham, blowing up a bridge between the two towns. The Cambodian government issued a new security decree prohibiting political gatherings and protests. Senior U.S., South Vietnamese and Cambodian officials met in Phnom Penh to discuss the deteriorating security situation around the capital.

A USAF F-4 was shot down by a SAM near the Mụ Giạ Pass.

17 December - 30 January 1972

Campaign Z was a PAVN combined arms operation against the RLA base at Long Tieng. The PAVN used T-34 tanks and 130mm field guns for the first time supported by VPAF fighter jets. The PAVN were able to temporarily seize high ground and shell Long Tieng before being pushed back.

18 December

The New York Times reported that the U.S. Army in Vietnam was discharging between 1,000 and 2,000 soldiers for heroin usage despite the Nixon Administration pledging that heroin users would be retained in the Army where they would be treated.

A VPAF MiG-21 downed the first U.S. aircraft since June 1968, a USAF F-4D flying a combat air patrol approximately 70 miles (110 km) west/northwest of Bái Thượng Air Base. Two USAF F-4s searching for the crew of the downed aircraft were engaged by two MiG-21s, ultimately resulting in the ejection of the two F-4 crews for lack of fuel and loss of their aircraft. Another F-4 was shot down by anti-aircraft fire near Long Tieng. Four U.S. crewmen were captured.

20 December

The South Vietnamese government announced 24 hour ceasefires for Christmas, New Year and Tết and said that the longer ceasefires announced by the VC were intended to allow for their recuperation and resupply.

21 December

An ANK task force reached Prakham relieving the garrison there.

The New York Times reported on the declining morale within the ANK in the face of the hardened PAVN opposition.

22 December

U.S. jets attacked a North Vietnamese antiaircraft radar site in the 101st "protective reaction" strike of the war.

The New York Times reported that information about the war was becoming increasingly difficult to obtain, particularly since MACV had stopped briefings on South Vietnamese operations earlier in the year.

The Soviet Union accused China of backing U.S. policy in Vietnam.

23 December

Secretary of State Rogers said that the U.S. would continue to conduct airstrikes in Laos and Cambodia into 1972 in order to disrupt North Vietnamese offensives.

Bob Hope met with a North Vietnamese diplomat in Vientiane and offered US$10 million to a North Vietnamese children's charity to secure the release of U.S. POWs.

25 December

South Vietnam reported 26 PAVN/VC ceasefire breaches with 13 ARVN and 11 PAVN/VC killed. U.S. jets conducted their 106th "protective reaction" strike of the year against a SAM radar site 5 miles (8.0 km) from the Laos border.

26-8 December

Sixteen members of Vietnam Veterans Against the War occupied the Statue of Liberty before eventually leaving after a court order.

26-30 December

In response to the recent attacks on U.S. aircraft, Nixon ordered Operation Proud Deep Alpha, an intensive five-day bombing campaign against airfields, antiaircraft sites and other military targets in North Vietnam just north of the DMZ above the 17th parallel north.

27 December

The New York Times reported on growing campaigns within the U.S. for an amnesty for deserters and draft evaders.

28 December

ARVN units killed 28 PAVN in a skirmish in the Central Highlands.

80 members of Vietnam Veterans Against the War were arrested on the steps of the Lincoln Memorial.

28-9 December

PAVN and Pathet Lao forces captured Paksong securing control of the Boloven Plateau but they abandon it to the RLA on the 29th.

30 December

Daniel Ellsberg was again indicted on Federal criminal charges relating to the release of the Pentagon Papers.

30 December - 16 March 1972

Operation Maharat was the RLA defense of the Route 7 and 13 intersection at Sala Phoun Khoun. After being initially pushed out the RLA counterattacked and seized the area.

31 December

The number of U.S. military personnel in South Vietnam totaled 156,800.

== Year in numbers ==
Armed Force	Strength	KIA	Reference	Military costs - 1971	Military costs in 2026 US$	Reference
South Vietnam	1,048,000	22,738
United States	250,900	2,414
South Korea	45,700
Thailand	6,000
Australia	2,000
Philippines	50
New Zealand	100
Vietnam

== See also ==
List of allied military operations of the Vietnam War (1971)
