= List of allied military operations of the Vietnam War (1971) =

This article is a list of known military operations of the Vietnam War in 1971, conducted by the armed forces of the Republic of Vietnam, the Khmer Republic, the United States and their allies.

Date Duration	Operation Name	Unit(s) – Description	Location	VC–PAVN KIAs	Allied KIAs
Jan 1 – Mar 13	Operation Greene Storm	173rd Airborne Brigade operation	Bình Định, Phu Bon and Pleiku Provinces		
Jan 1 – Mar 31	Operation Greene Lightning	173rd Airborne Brigade operation	Bình Định Province		
Jan 1 – Apr 31	Operation Keystone Robin (Charlie)	Redeployment of the 1st Cavalry Division, 2nd Brigade, 25th Infantry Division and 11th Armored Cavalry Regiment from South Vietnam to the United States			
Jan 4 – 21	Operation Golden Dragon II	ROK 2nd Marine Brigade clear and search operation	Quảng Nam Province	1	
Jan 11 – Mar 29	Operation Upshur Stream	1st Reconnaissance Battalion, 1st Battalion, 1st Marines and 1st Battalion, 11th Marines search and destroy operation	Quảng Nam Province		
Jan 30 – Feb 5	Operation Dewey Canyon II	1st Brigade, 5th Infantry Division, 101st Airborne Division and 2nd Squadron, 17th Cavalry Regiment operation to support the ARVN Operation Lam Son 719 effort to open Route 9 through Khe Sanh to the Laotian border and to reestablish Khe Sanh as a major combat support base	Route 9		estimated 75
Feb 2 – Mar 8	Operation Ivy	173rd Airborne Brigade reconnaissance operation			
Feb 3 – Mar 10	Operation Hoang Dieu 103	III MAF, ROK 2nd Marine Brigade and ARVN 51st Regiment operation	Quảng Nam Province		
Feb 8 – Mar 25	Operation Lam Son 719	ARVN armored and airborne invasion of Laos with US airlift and air support along Route 9 to Tchepone to sever the Ho Chi Minh Trail	Route 9	2163	1529 ARVN KIA, 625 MIA, 215 US KIA, 38 MIA
Mar 1 – Jul 1	Operation Finney Hill	11th Infantry Brigade and 198th Infantry Brigade operation	Quảng Ngãi Province	781	93
Mar 1 – Jul 1	Operation Middlesex Peak	196th Infantry Brigade, 198th Infantry Brigade and ARVN 2nd Division operation	Quang Tin and Quảng Ngãi Provinces	463	
Mar 9	Operation Bright Light	198th Infantry Brigade POW recovery operation	Quảng Ngãi Province		
Mar 13 – 27	Operation Wasco Rapids	198th Infantry Brigade and ARVN 2nd Division clear and search operation in	Song Ve river valley, Quảng Ngãi Province		
Mar 14 – Apr 21	Operation Greene Sure	173rd Airborne Brigade operation	Bình Định Province		
Apr 8 – Jul 11	Operation Montana Mustang	1st Brigade, 5th Infantry Division operation intended to locate and destroy enemy forces, eliminate VC infrastructure, conduct reaction/exploitation operations and assist in pacification and Vietnamization	Quảng Trị Province	91	57
Apr 29 – Jul 1	Operation Caroline Hill	196th Infantry Brigade operation	Quảng Nam Province		
May 1 – June 30	Operation Keystone Oriole (Alpha)	Redeployment of three infantry battalions and one air cavalry squadron from South Vietnam to the United States			
May 4 – 31	Operation Toan Thang TT02	ARVN III Corps operation to lure the VC with a regiment placed in Snoul	north of Lộc Ninh on Route 13		
May 4 – June 29	Operation Quyet Thang 208	ARVN 2nd Division and 71st Assault Helicopter Company operation	Quang Tin, Quảng Ngãi and Kon Tum Provinces		
June 6–7	Operation Overlord	6–7 June 1971	3rd Battalion, Royal Australian Regiment pacification operation in Long Khánh Province		
Jul	Operation Iron Fox	2nd Squadron SAS, 3rd Battalion, Royal Australian Regiment and 4th Battalion, Royal Australian Regiment/Royal New Zealand Infantry Regiment (ANZAC) operation against the VC 274th Regiment		12	1
Jul 1 – Aug 31	Operation Keystone Oriole (Bravo)	Redeployment of the 173rd Airborne Brigade from South Vietnam to the United States			
Jul 1 – Oct 4	Unnamed	23rd Infantry Division operation	Quảng Ngãi Province	324	
Aug 20 – Dec 3	Operation Chenla II	FANK operation against NVA to reopen Route 6	Route 6	3500+ claimed	4500+ claimed
Sep 1 – Nov 30	Operation Keystone Oriole (Charlie)	Redeployment of the 23rd Infantry Division, 11th Infantry Brigade and 198th Infantry Brigade from South Vietnam to the United States			
Sep 6 – 25	Operation Lam Son 810	ARVN operation with US support to disrupt the flow of PAVN supplies	northern Quảng Trị Province	175	75
Sep 18 – Oct 2	Operation Ivanhoe	4th Battalion, Royal Australian Regiment/Royal New Zealand Infantry Regiment (ANZAC) security operation in northern Phước Tuy Province		5	
Sep 28 – Oct 2	Operation Katum	3/1 Cavalry and 2nd Squadron, 11th Armored Cavalry Regiment security operation for the withdrawal of US personnel	FSB Katum, Tây Ninh Province		
Dec 1 – Jan 31 72	Operation Keystone Mallard	101st Airborne Division redeployment from South Vietnam to the United States			
Dec 26 – 30	Operation Proud Deep Alpha	USAF and USN bombing operations	Route Package 1 south of the 20th Parallel		7

== See also ==
- List of allied military operations of the Vietnam War (1972)
