= Operation Middlesex Peak =

Part of the Vietnam War (1971)

- Part of the Vietnam War
Date	10 March – 1 July 1971
Location	Quảng Tín and Quảng Ngãi Provinces, South Vietnam
Result	US operational success

Belligerents
United States	North Vietnam; Viet Cong

Units involved
196th Light Infantry Brigade; 198th Light Infantry Brigade	2nd Division

Casualties and losses
50 killed	462 killed 22 captured

Operation Middlesex Peak was a security operation during the Vietnam War conducted by the 196th Light Infantry Brigade later joined by the 198th Light Infantry Brigade, 23rd Infantry Division in Quảng Tín and Quảng Ngãi Provinces from 10 March to 1 July 1971.

== Background ==
The operation was an ongoing security operation to prevent People's Army of Vietnam (PAVN) and Vietcong (VC) infiltration into the populated coastal lowlands. The operation entailed the 196th Brigade patrolling a broad swath of plains and foothills totalling more than 1,000 square kilometres.

== Operation ==
Cumulative results of all contacts for the period 1 March through 20 March were 68 PAVN/VC killed, 15 individual and two crew-served weapons captured and one US killed. On 21 March Company A, 5th Battalion, 46th Infantry Regiment killed five PAVN/VC and detained six suspects. On 28 March in the Battle of FSB Mary Ann, VC overran the base killing 33 US for the loss of 13 VC killed. On the morning of 31 March Troop F, 17th Cavalry Regiment engaged a PAVN/VC force killing 11.

On 1 April Company D, 1/46th found an arms cache containing six weapons. On 5 April Troop F, 17th Cavalry found seven graves of PAVN/VC killed by artillery. On 7 April troops of Troop F, 17th Cavalry detonated a mine killing one US. On 11 April the 198th Light Infantry Brigade ended its involvement in Operation Finney Hill and joined the operation. For the period 8 through 15 April there were 21 PAVN/VC killed and eight weapons captured. On 16 April a Company C, 5/46th mechanical ambush detonated killing three PAVN/VC and leaving two weapons. A 198th Brigade unit detonated a booby-trapped 105mm artillery round resulting in one US killed. On 21 April Troop H, 17th Cavalry in night laager position was hit by two explosions at 00:15 resulting in one US killed and one M113A1 destroyed. On 23 April Troop E, 1st Battalion, 1st Cavalry Regiment killed four PAVN/VC and captured one weapon and Company A, 1st Battalion, 6th Infantry Regiment killed four PAVN/VC. On 25 April the two Brigades reported 15 PAVN/VC killed and three weapons captured for US losses of two killed. On 27 April Troop F, 17th cavalry detonated a land mine resulting in two US killed and one M113 destroyed. On 28 April Company D, 1st Battalion, 52nd Infantry Regiment killed four PAVN and captured one weapon. Cumulative results of the operation until the end of April 1971 were 45 US killed and 274 PAVN/VC killed, 13 captured and 90 weapons captured.

On 5 May Company D, 1/52nd killed five PAVN and 3rd Battalion, 16th Field Artillery regiment killed three VC. On 10 May Company B, 26th Engineers detonated a mine resulting in two US killed. On 12 May Company E, 1/6th killed four VC. On 15 May an aerial observer found four VC dead. On 16 May Company D, 1/52nd killed three VC and detained two suspects. On 17 May Company B, 1/6th killed one VC, Company A, 1/52nd killed one VC and Company G, 75th Rangers killed one VC and captured one weapon and one suspect. On 19 May Company D 1/52nd engaged three PAVN killing two and capturing two weapons. On 20 May Company B, 1/52nd killed one VC and Company A 4/3rd killed two VC. On 23 May Recon Company 1/6th and Troop D, 1/1st Cavalry killed three VC. On 24 May gunships of Troop D, 1/1st cavalry and the 71st Aviation Company killed four VC. On 26 May Recon Company, 1/52nd ambushed three VC, killed two and captured six weapons and Company C, 1/52nd and the 116th Aviation Company killed six VC and captured one weapon. On 27 May Troop D, 1/1st Cavalry killed four PAVN. On 29 May Company D, 4/3rd Infantry killed one VC and captured two weapons, a patrol from Company A, 4/3rd captured eight crew-served weapons, Company C, 1/52nd killed one VC and a gunship from Troop D 1/1st Cavalry killed one VC. On 30 May gunships from Troop D, 1/1st Cavalry and Troop B, 123rd Aviation killed 10 VC.

On 1 June Company C, 4/3rd killed one VC in a mechanical ambush, Company A 4/3rd killed one VC and detained two suspects, Company A, 1/52nd killed one VC and detained two suspects and Battery B, 3/16th Artillery killed five VC. On 3 June Company B, 4/3rd killed one VC, Company A, 1/6th killed one VC and captured two weapons and one suspect and gunships from Troop D, 1/1st Cavalry killed one VC. On 4 June a patrol of Company B, 1/52nd received small arms fire resulting in one US killed and gunships from Troop B, 123rd Aviation killed two VC. On 7 June Company C, 1/52nd killed one VC. On 8 June Company E, 1/6th Infantry and Troop D, 1/1st Cavalry engaged 25 VC killing nine, in a sweep of the area the next day a further six bodies were found. On 11 June Company C, 4/3rd killed one VC in a mechanical ambush. On 12 June Company C, 4/3rd killed one VC, Company A, 1/52nd killed one PAVN and captured one weapon. On 13 June Troop D, 1/1st Cavalry killed three VC. On 14 June 116th Aviation killed three VC. On 17 June Company A, 4/3rd engaged four VC capturing two and one weapon, Company A, 1/52nd killed one VC and captured one weapon and gunships from 116th Aviation killed two VC. On 18 June Company B, 1/52nd and Battery D, 1/14th Artillery received mortar fire losing one killed and Company D, 4/3rd killed one VC in a mechanical ambush. On 20 June Company B, 1/52nd killed one VC, Company D, 1/52nd killed six PAVN/VC and captured three weapons, Company D, 1/1st killed one VC and lost one US and 176th Aviation killed three VC. On 21 June Company D, 4/3rd killed one VC, Company A, 4/3rd killed one VC, Company D, 1/52nd detonated a booby-trap losing one killed, Company E, 1/52nd snipers killed one VC and Troop D, 1/1st Cavalry killed one PAVN. On 22 June Company A, 4/3rd mechanical ambushes killed two VC. On 24 June Recon Company, 4/3rd killed one VC, captured two and two weapons, Troop D. 1/1st killed three VC. On 26 June Company A, 4/3rd found a PAVN grave. On 27 June Company C, 1/52nd found two VC graves. On 28 June Company C, 4/3rd detonated a booby-trap losing two killed. On 29 June Company A, 4/3rd killed one VC in a mechanical ambush. On 30 June Company D, 1/6th killed one VC and captured a weapon, 1/52nd snipers killed one VC and captured one weapon, Battery A, 3/18th Artillery received mortar fire losing one US killed and Troop B, 123rd Aviation killed one VC.

== Aftermath ==
The operation concluded on 1 July 1971. US losses were 50 killed, 463 PAVN/VC were killed and 22 captured and 122 individual and 16 crew-served weapons captured.
