= Firebase Pace =

Former U.S. Army firebase

Site information
- Type: Army
- Condition: abandoned

Location
- Coordinates: 11.653°N 105.978°E

Site history
- Built: 1971
- In use: 1971
- Battles/wars: Vietnam War

Garrison information
- Occupants: 1st Battalion, 12th Cavalry Regiment; 2nd Battalion, 32nd Field Artillery Regiment

Firebase Pace is a former U.S. Army firebase near the Vietnam-Cambodia border north-northwest of Tây Ninh, Vietnam.

== History ==
Pace was located approximately 1 kilometre (0.62 mi) from the Cambodian border and 4 kilometres (2.5 mi) northwest of Thien Ngon.

On 26 September 1971, People's Army of Vietnam (PAVN) forces conducted rocket and sapper attacks against ten Army of the Republic of Vietnam (ARVN) bases and Pace, all near the Cambodian border. 230 PAVN and 27 ARVN were killed in the attacks.

On 9 October, five U.S. soldiers at the base refused to undertake a patrol outside the perimeter of the firebase. The combat refusal was widely reported by the media, as was a letter signed by 65 American soldiers at Pace to Senator Edward Kennedy, protesting that they were being ordered to participate in offensive combat operations despite U.S. policy to the contrary.

On 13 October, a U.S. AH-1 Cobra gunship was shot down near Pace. By 18 October, the PAVN bombardment of Pace had continued for its 23rd consecutive day. On 22 October, U.S. forces withdrew from Pace, leaving the base and its four guns to an ARVN Airborne battalion which took over the base. In four separate actions around Pace, the ARVN reported killing 47 PAVN. On 23 October, ARVN troops found the bodies of 53 PAVN killed by airstrikes 3 miles (4.8 km) south of Pace.
