= Bat Doeng =

Town in Cambodia

Coordinates: 11°41′00″N 104°42′00″E

Bat Doeng (Khmer: បាត់ដឹង) is a town in Kampong Speu province in central Cambodia.

== Transport ==
It is served by a station on the national railway network.

Bat Doeng is the proposed site for the junction of a new railway connecting Cambodia with Vietnam at Lộc Ninh.

== See also ==
- Transport in Cambodia
  - Petroleum Station in Oudongkmae Chhey Province **

1. TELA STOCK Batdeng 2. CHE PHALLA PETROLEUM STATION 3. RAKSEY DEPO TELA
