= Operation Xieng Dong =

- Part of Laotian Civil War; Vietnam War
Date	7 April – 5 July 1971
Location	Luang Prabang Province, Laos
Result	Royal Lao Army and allies successfully defend the royal capital. People's Army of Vietnam retreats.

Belligerents
North Vietnam (Laos) Pathet Lao	Kingdom of Laos; Forces Armées Neutralistes; Special Guerilla Units Supported by CIA of the United States

Units involved
335th Independent Regiment	Bataillon Parachutistes 101; Bataillon Commando 205; Bataillon Guerrier 121; Two more MR 1 Bataillon Guerrier; Bataillon Guerrier 227; Two MR 5 battalions Groupement Mobile 32 Half regiment of two battalions Irregulars

Operation Xieng Dong (7 April – 5 June 1971) was a successful defensive strike by the Royal Lao Army (RLA) against an invasion by the People's Army of Vietnam (PAVN). In early February 1971, PAVN forces swept RLA defenders from a line of hilltop positions guarding the royal capital of Luang Prabang. The city's perceived invulnerability to attack was shattered. King Sisavang Vatthana refused to leave his capital. Other Military Regions of Laos hastily forwarded to Luang Prabang's Military Region 1 any troops that could be spared from the rest of the Laotian Civil War. On 7 April, the resulting patchwork force of RLA battalions, Forces Armee Neutraliste half regiment, and Central Intelligence Agency-backed Special Guerrilla Units managed a three-pronged offensive supported by tactical aviation that surrounded and defeated the invading PAVN 335th Independent Regiment, which had gotten within eight kilometers of Luang Prabang. By 5 June 1971, the 335th was in full retreat.

== Overview ==
As early as April 1953, during the First Indochina War, Vietnamese communist forces under General Võ Nguyên Giáp invaded northern Laos with four divisions. With four to one odds in their favor, the Vietnamese did not complete their capture of the royal capital of Luang Prabang. The Viet Minh contented themselves with establishing a base area in Houaphanh Province, adjacent to the set piece Battle of Dien Ben Phu that would decide the war.

When personally asked by General Raoul Salan on 23 April 1953 if he would evacuate Luang Prabang, King Sisavang Vong elected to remain, thus committing the French to defense of the royal capital. The king's decision was at least partially responsible for the French commitment to Dien Ben Phu the following year. On 24 April, the Blind Bonze Pho Sathou predicted, without leaving his temple, that the North Vietnamese invasion would recede back northward. On the 30th, still in his wat, the Blind Bonze predicted that the communists were not en route to conquer the administrative capital of Vientiane; the latter fact was verified within a few days by French military intelligence.

On 9 May, the Vietnamese began to withdraw from their positions outside Luang Prabang, as foreseen by Sathou. Later, French intelligence discovered that a French unit had destroyed a crucial logistics center along the communist supply route to Luang Prabang; the Vietnamese invasion had been starved out. However, the Vietnamese once again attacked Luang Prabang, beginning 27 January 1954. Despite having committed the 308th Division, 148th Independent Regiment, and some additional troops to the effort, the invasion was blunted, with French defense forces taking heavy casualties. On 20 February 1954, the communists once again began to retreat to North Vietnam; however, they left behind a shadow administration of Pathet Lao (PL). The "blind bonze" incident established a legend of Luang Prabang's invulnerability that would influence its defense during the Laotian Civil War.

== Background ==
In February 1971, North Vietnamese troops attacked and captured a string of hilltop positions forming a defensive line northeast of Luang Prabang. The communists had previously struck at the Royal Lao Air Force (RLAF) and the Lima 54 airfield in Military Region 1 (MR 1) without touching the city. Now they seemed poised to overrun it. The general belief that Pathet Lao respect for King Savang Vatthana protected Luang Prabang from assault suddenly seemed questionable. To guarantee the monarchy's succession, the crown prince was moved south to Vientiane. The threat to the monarchy energized the Royal Lao Armed Forces. In contrast to their usual parsimonious ways, commands of other Military Regions readily provided troops to protect King Sisavang Vatthana.

Reinforcements for Luang Prabang were rushed in from the other Military Regions. Bataillon Parachutistes 101 was immediately diverted from a pending offensive on the Bolovens Plateau in Military Region 4 (MR 4). Military Region 5 (MR 5) forwarded Bataillon Commando 205 from Vientiane. Both battalions were forwarded to a position 14 kilometers northeast of the capital, at the juncture of the Nam Soung and Mekong Rivers. On 22 March, the communists drove the Royalist infantry from their position on the King's farm and took it over.

A Royal Lao Army (RLA) artillery battalion joined the retreat, resetting its guns on the Luang Prabang airfield. Dawn 23 March 1971 found the 335th Independent Regiment of the People's Army of Vietnam (PAVN) just eight kilometers from Luang Prabang, tasked with capturing it. They were faced by several understrength RLA battalions and a single 105mm artillery battery. Bataillon Guerrier 121 (BG 121) was ordered to push back the communists, but had no success.

The other two Battalion Guerriers assigned to MR 1 were recalled from the field and placed into defensive locations. Meanwhile, reinforcements poured in from across the nation. MR 3 forwarded two battalions from Savannakhet. Military Region 2 (MR 2) shifted Bataillon Guerrier 227 (BG 227) from its recruitment drive, across the Regional border into MR 1. Forces Armées Neutralistes also dispatched half a regiment consisting of two of its battalions from MR 2. Military Region 5 supplied a battalion from Vientiane, and another from Sayaboury Province. MR 5 also came up with other reinforcements—a gunboat squadron on the Mekong River, five M-706 armored cars, and both 105mm and 155mm howitzers.

== Activities ==
With three monarchist commands involved—Royal Lao Army, Neutralists, CIA-backed guerrillas—coordination became essential. Even as they consulted, the communists pushed BG 121 and some allied military irregulars back towards the capital. Meanwhile, the conference planned a three part counterattack with air support from both the RLAF and the U.S. Air Force.

On 7 April 1971, Operation Xieng Dong began with the two MR 3 battalions being airlifted to a spot 17 kilometers east of Luang Prabang. On the 9th, they were strengthened by an added battalion and a heavy weapons company. They then swept westward to dislodge a PAVN battalion occupying the village of Ban Nathan. On 17 April, they captured Ban Nathan after a three-day fight. On the 20th, a fourth Royalist battalion was airlifted in. The Groupement Mobile 32 (GM 32) regiment was complete for its pursuit northward after the communists.

While that sweep worked its way back toward Luang Prabang, MR 1's own local battalions began to move northward against little resistance. By 24 April 1971, they had reached the south bank of the Nam Soung where it ran into the Mekong. On 15 May, they were helilifted over the Nam Soung to its northern bank. The 335th PAVN Regiment was now penned against the Mekong by the eastern and southern monarchist movements. In late May, the third prong of the Xieng Dong offensive finally moved east, with its two RLA battalions crossing the Mekong north of the communists. The 335th was surrounded and cut off, briefly tried a breakout on 5 June 1971, then retreated back towards North Vietnam to be reconstituted.

== Result ==
Operation Xieng Dong successfully defended the royal capital.

== Aftermath ==
The 335th PAVN Regiment, having been withdrawn from its usual station in Military Region 1, was replaced by the 8th Independent Regiment so the PAVN could maintain their presence.

The heavy weapons company committed to Operation Xieng Dong was not relinquished to form the 324th Heavy Weapons Battalion. As a result, all MR 3's GM regiments had a heavy weapons company parceled out to them because the 324th could not be formed.
