= Operation Caroline Hill =

Part of the Vietnam War (1971)

- Part of the Vietnam War
Date	29 April – 1 July 1971
Location	Quảng Ngãi Province, South Vietnam

Belligerents
United States	North Vietnam; Viet Cong

Units involved
196th Light Infantry Brigade	2nd Division

Casualties and losses
15 killed	161 killed 11 captured

Operation Caroline Hill was a security operation during the Vietnam War conducted by the 196th Light Infantry Brigade, 23rd Infantry Division in Quảng Nam Province from 29 April to 1 July 1971. It was the 23rd Division’s last named operation of the war.

== Background ==
The brigade’s mission was to locate and engage People’s Army of Vietnam (PAVN) and Viet Cong (VC) forces, lines of communications and base areas and provide security for pacification programs in the area west and south of Da Nang following the departure of the III Marine Amphibious Force.

== Operation ==
- On 1 May a Troop A, 1st Battalion, 1st Cavalry Regiment ACAV hit a 155mm artillery round rigged as a mine, destroying the ACAV.
- On 2 May Headquarters Company, 1/1st Cavalry detonated a mine resulting in 1 US killed.
- On 12 May Troop C, 1/1st Cavalry hit a mine resulting in 1 US killed and Troop A, 1/1st Cavalry killed 2 PAVN and captured 3 weapons.
- On 14 May a Forward Air Controller (FAC) directed fire killing15 PAVN and Troop F, 17th Cavalry Regiment detonated a mine resulting in 5 US killed.
- On 15 May a patrol from Company A, 2nd Battalion, 1st Infantry Regiment was ambushed resulting in 2 US killed and 4 PAVN/VC killed.
- On 17 May Company A, 2/1st killed 2 PAVN.
- On 19 May Company B, 3rd Battalion, 21st Infantry Regiment killed 1 VC.
- On 20 May Troop A, 1/1st Cavalry found 4 VC graves and Battery A, 3rd Battalion, 16th Field Artillery Regiment fire killed 1 VC.
- On 21 May Company D, 2/1st Infantry killed 2 VC, Troop A, 1/1st Cavalry found 1 VC killed by artillery fire and a Company B, 2/1st mechanical ambush killed 1 PAVN and 1 weapon was captured.
- On 22 May Recon Company, 2/1st killed 1 VC and Troop C, 1/1st Cavalry killed 2 VC and captured 1 weapon.
- On 23 May a Company B, 2/1st mechanical ambush killed 1 VC and 1 weapon was captured, Company B, 3/21st killed 2 VC, Troop C, 1/1st Cavalry killed 2 VC and gunships from Troop F, 8th Cavalry Regiment killed 2 VC.
- On 24 May Company B, 2/1st found 2 dead VC killed by air and Troop C, 1/1st Cavalry killed 6 VC and captured 3 individual and 1 crew-served weapon.
- On 25 May Troop C, 1/1st Cavalry killed 4 VC.
- On 26 May a Recon Company, 2/1st mechanical ambush killed 1 VC.
- On 27 May Recon Company, 2/1st killed 2 VC and Battery A, 3/16th Artillery fire killed 4 VC.
- On 28 May a 173rd Aviation Company UH-1H was shot down.
- On 29 May a FAC observed 3 VC killed by artillery, Troop F, 8th Cavalry attacked a bunker killing 1 VC, capturing 3 weapons and detaining 5 suspects and Company A, 1st Battalion, 46th Infantry Regiment attacked a bunker complex killing 4 VC.
- On 31 May a Recon Company 3/21st ambush killed 1 VC and Company C, 3/21st killed 2 VC.
- On 1 June Recon Company, 2/1st killed 1 PAVN.
- On 2 June a Company D, 2/1st soldier was killed by a booby-trap, Troop F, 8th Cavalry engaged a PAVN/VC force capturing1 weapon and detaining 1 suspected VC and Troop D, 1/1st Cavalry killed 3 VC.
- On 3 June Company D, 3/21st detained 1 suspect and captured 1 weapon, Troop A, 1/1st Cavalry killed 1 VC and captured 1 weapon and Troop C, 1/1st Cavalry found 1 crew-served weapon.
- On 4 June 3 VC were killed by artillery fire.
- On 5 June a Recon Company, 3/21st mechanical ambush killed 2 PAVN and 1 weapon was captured, Troop C, 1/1st Cavalry killed 1 VC and captured 1 weapon and Troop F, 8th Cavalry killed 2 PAVN and detained 1 suspect.
- On 6 June Company B, 1/46th ambushed 10 VC killing 4 and capturing 1 weapon.
- On 8 June Troop B, 1/1st cavalry killed 5 PAVN and detained 3 suspects. Between 9 and 11 June Company C, 3//21st killed 2 PAVN and captured 2 weapons and a Company D, 1/46th mechanical ambush killed 2 PAVN and 2 weapons were captured.
- On 12 June Troop F, 17th Cavalry Regiment detonated a mine resulting in 1 US killed.
- On 19 June Troop F, 8th Cavalry killed 2 PPAVN and captured 1 weapon.
- On 20 June Recon Company, 2/1st killed 2 VC and captured 1 weapon and a Company A, 1/46th mechanical ambush killed 1 PAVN and 1 weapon was captured.
- On 22 June Troop F, 8th Cavalry killed 2 VC.
- On 23 June Troop F, 8th Cavalry killed 1 PAVN.
- On 25 June Troop F, 8th Cavalry’s aero-rifle platoon killed 5 VC.
- On 27 June Company C, 3/21st killed 1 VC.
- On 28 June Troop A, 1/1st Cavalry found 2 weapons, a Brigade LOH was shot down with 1 crewmember killed and 3 VC killed.
- On 30 June Company C, 3/21st killed 5 PAVN/VC and detained 1 suspect and Troop D, 1/1st Cavalry killed 1 PAVN.

== Aftermath ==
The operation ended on 1 July 1971. US losses were 15 killed, PAVN/VC losses were 161 killed, 11 captured and 81 individual and 10 crew-served weapons captured.
