= Operation Finney Hill =

Part of the Vietnam War (1971)

- Part of the Vietnam War
Date	10 March – 1 July 1971
Location	Quảng Ngãi Province, South Vietnam
Result	US operational success

Belligerents
United States	North Vietnam; Viet Cong

Units involved
198th Light Infantry Brigade; 11th Infantry Brigade	2nd Division

Casualties and losses
32 killed	454 killed 8 captured

Operation Finney Hill was a security operation during the Vietnam War conducted by the 198th Light Infantry Brigade and later the 11th Infantry Brigade, 23rd Infantry Division in Quảng Ngãi Province from 10 March to 1 July 1971.

== Background ==
The operation’s objective was to ensure the security of lines of communication and pacification operations in the coastal area of Quảng Ngãi Province.

== Operation ==
On 4 March Company D, 1st Battalion, 52nd Infantry Regiment engaged a People’s Army of Vietnam (PAVN) squad killing 4 and capturing 2 weapons. On 6 March Company C, 3rd Battalion, 1st Infantry Regiment detonated a booby-trap killing 2 US soldiers. On 8 March Troop B, 123rd Aviation Company killed 5 Vietcong (VC). On 11 March Company B, 26th Engineers detonated a mine killing 2 US. On 20 March Company C, 1/52nd killed 12 PAVN and captured 2 weapons. On 24 March Company C, 1/52nd engaged a VC squad killing 5. On 28 March Company C, 1/52nd killed 3 PAVN and found a further 12 dead killed by airstrikes.

On 2 April Company D, 1st Battalion, 20th Infantry Regiment received mortar and small arms fire killing 1 US. On 3 April Company D, 1/52nd killed 3 PAVN. On 7 April Company D, 1/52nd received small arms and B-40 fire and killed 6 PAVN. On 11 April a UH-1H on a resupply mission to Company A, 1/20th was hit by ground fire and exploded killing 6 US. An attack on Company A, 1/20th resulted in 2 PAVN killed and 1 captured while US losses were 5 killed. On 11 April the 11th Infantry Brigade assumed control of the operation. On 23 April a booby-trap killed 7 soldiers of Company C, 4th Battalion, 21st Infantry Regiment. On 29 April Company D, 3/1st found a weapons cache containing 100 individual and 27 crew-served weapons. On 30 April Company D, 1/20th killed 4 VC. The cumulative totals for the operation to the end of April were 31 US killed and 327 PAVN/VC killed and 5 captured.

On 8 May gunships from Troop B, 123rd Aviation killed 6 PAVN. On 12 May Troop B, 123rd Aviation killed 2 PAVN and captured 5 weapons. On 16 May Troop B, 123rd Aviation killed 4 PAVN and captured 3 suspects. On 17 May Recon Company, 1/20th killed 2 VC and captured 1 weapon. On 18 May gunships from Troop B, 123rd Aviation killed 4 PAVN. On 19 May gunships from Troop B, 123rd Aviation killed 5 VC. On 20 May Company B, 1/20th killed 1 PAVN. On 21 May gunships from Troop B, 123rd Aviation killed 1 VC. On 22 May gunships from Troop B, 123rd Aviation killed 1 PAVN, Company B, 1/20th triggered a mechanical ambush killing 2 PAVN and capturing 2 weapons and troop D, 1/1st Cavalry killed 1 VC. On 23 May Company C, 3/1st found 1 dead PAVN. On 25 May Company C, 1/20th engaged 4 VC capturing 1 weapon. On 27 May a Company B, 1/20th mechanical ambush killed 2 PAVN and 2 weapons were captured. On 28 May Troop B, 123rd Aviation killed 4 PAVN/VC and 174th Assault killed 13 VC. On 29 may Troop B, 123rd Aviation’s aero-rifle platoon killed 2 VC and captured 1 weapon. On 30 May Troop B, 12rd Aviation gunships killed 1 PAVN. On 31 May Company B, 4/21st found 1 dead PAVN.

On 1 June a Troop H, 17th Cavalry mechanical ambush killed 1 VC. On 3 June Company C, 1/20th engaged 18 VC, killing 1 and capturing 1 weapon. On 18 June a Company D, 3/1st mechanical ambush killed 3 PAVN and 3 weapons were captured. On 19 June Troop B, 123rd Aviation gunships killed 14 PAVN/VC and snipers of 3/1st killed 2 VC. On 22 June gunships from Troop B, 123rd Aviation killed 7 VC. On 23 June Troop E, 1st cavalry killed 2 VC, captured 2 weapons and 7 suspects. On 25 June Recon Company, 1/20th killed 2 PAVN. On 30 June a Troop E, 1st Cavalry mechanical ambush killed 1 VC. On 31 June Troop H, 17th cavalry detonated a mine killing 1 US.

== Aftermath ==
The operation ended on 1 July 1971. US losses were 32 killed, PAVN/VC losses were 454 killed, 8 captured and 241 individual and 33 crew-served weapons captured.
