= 198th Infantry Brigade (United States) =

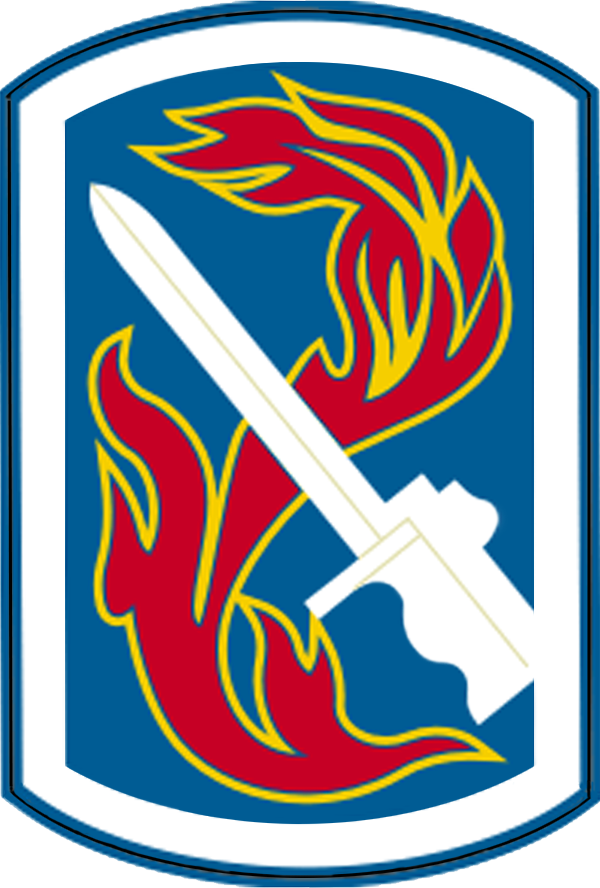
- Shoulder sleeve insignia
- Active: 24 June 1921–29 September 1945 (various designations); 25 March 1948–1 August 1962 (99th Recon. Troop, Mech.); 10 May 1967–30 November 1971 (198th Infantry Bge.); 9 November 2006–present
- Country: United States
- Branch: United States Army
- Role: Infantry One Station Unit Training (OSUT)
- Size: 5 Battalions + HHC
- Part of: United States Army Infantry School
- Garrison/HQ: Fort Benning, GA
- Mottos: "Brave and Bold"
- Engagements: World War II; Rhineland; Ardennes-Alsace; Central Europe; Vietnam; Counteroffensive, Phase Ill; Tet Counteroffensive; Counteroffensive, Phase lV; Counteroffensive, Phase V; Counteroffensive, Phase VI; Tet 69/Counteroffensive; Summer- Fall 1969; Winter- Spring 1970; Sanctuary Counteroffensive; Counteroffensive, Phase VII; Consolidation I
- Decorations: Belgian Fourragere; Republic of Vietnam Cross of Gallantry with Palm with oak leaf cluster
- Battle honours: Vietnam Service Medal
- Website: https://www.benning.army.mil/Infantry/198th/

Commanders
- Current commander: COL Jimmy L Hathaway
- Command Sergeant Major: CSM Lamont L Holmes
- Notable commanders: LTC Norman H Schwartzkopf; COL Joseph G. Clemons

Insignia
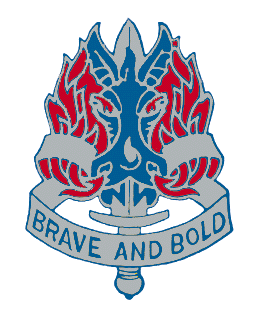
- Distinctive unit insignia

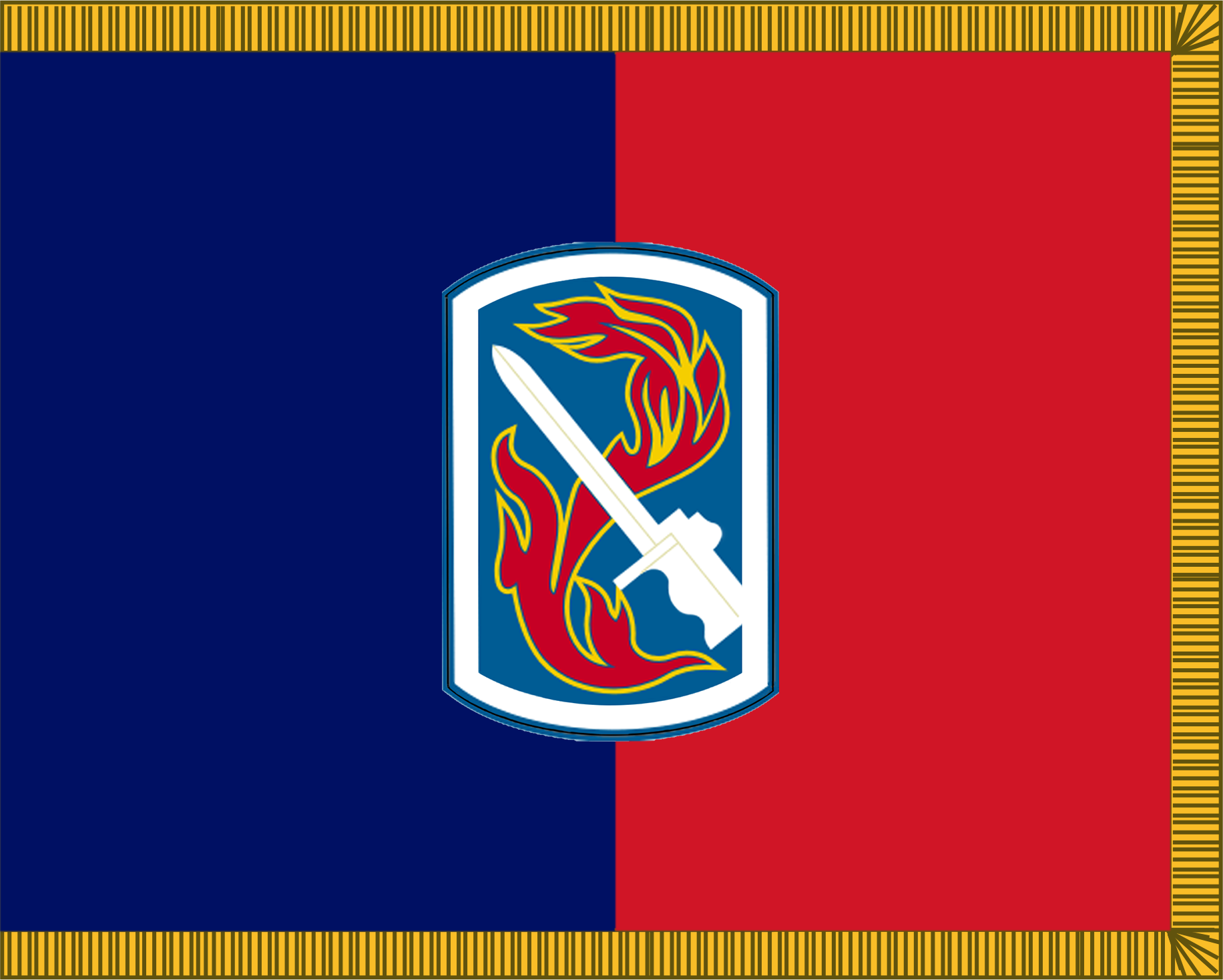
- 198th Infantry Brigade Flag

The 198th Infantry Brigade, was first formed as part of the United States Army Reserve's 99th Division. It was active from 1967 through 1971 and has been active since 2007 as an Infantry Training Brigade as part of the US Army Infantry School at Fort Benning, Georgia.

== Operational history ==
=== Vietnam War ===
During the years of 1967–1971 as part of the Vietnam War the 198th was part of the United States Army's 23rd "Americal" Infantry Division. In 1968, elements of the 198th Infantry Brigade, under the leadership of Lieutenant Colonel Robert B. Nelson, participated in the Battle of Kham Duc. On 21 November 1969, Colonel Joseph G. Clemons, (of Pork Chop Hill fame), assumed command of the 198th Infantry Brigade.

==== Order of battle ====
- Headquarters & Headquarters Company
- 1st Battalion, 6th Infantry
- 1st Battalion, 46th Infantry
- 5th Battalion, 46th Infantry
- 1st Battalion, 52nd Infantry
- 4th Battalion, 3rd Infantry (1971)
- 1st Battalion, 14th Artillery
- 9th Support Battalion
- 155th Engineer Company
- Troop H, 17th Cavalry

=== Post Vietnam ===
The 198th Infantry Brigade was reactivated on 15 May 2007 at Fort Benning, Georgia to serve as an Infantry Training Brigade.

- Headquarters & Support Company
  - 1st Battalion, 19th Infantry
  - 2nd Battalion, 19th Infantry
  - 1st Battalion, 46th Infantry
  - 2nd Battalion, 47th Infantry
  - 1st Battalion, 50th Infantry
  - 2nd Battalion, 54th Infantry
  - 2nd Battalion, 58th Infantry

== See also ==
- Battle of Kham Duc
