= Herbert L. Wilkerson =

U.S. Marine Corps Major General (1919–2021)

H. Lloyd Wilkerson
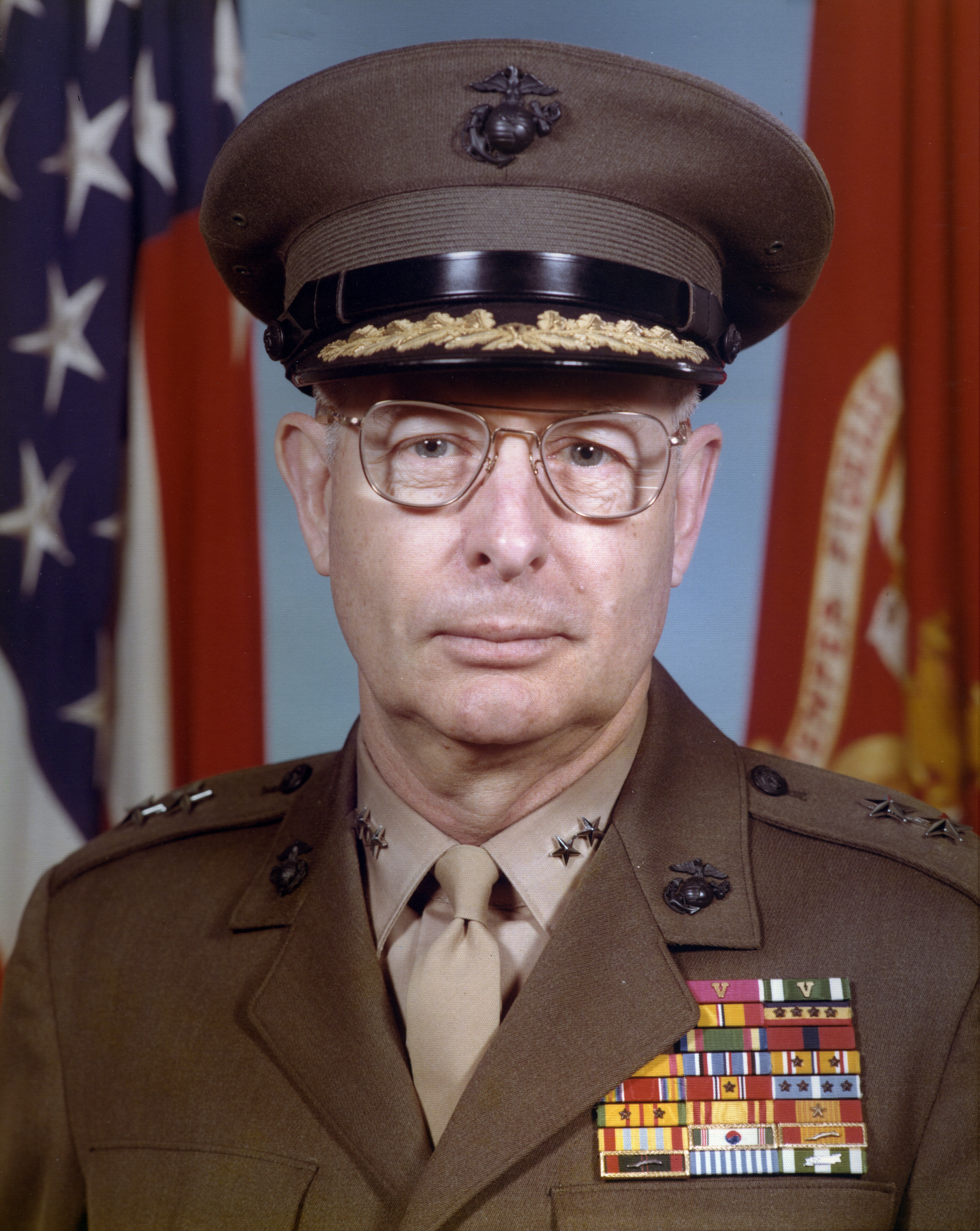
- Wilkerson in 1975
- Born: Herbert Lloyd Wilkerson; October 31, 1919; Troy, Tennessee, U.S.
- Died: October 11, 2021 (aged 101); Greensboro, North Carolina, U.S.
- Burial place: Arlington National Cemetery
- Relatives: MG Thomas L. Wilkerson (son); Thomas C. Coffin (father-in-law)
- Military career
- Allegiance: United States of America
- Branch: United States Marine Corps
- Service years: 1942–1978
- Rank: Major general
- Nickname: "Lloyd"
- Service number: 0-45163
- Commands: 3rd Marine Division; MCB Camp Lejeune; 1st Marine Regiment
- Conflicts: World War II: Guadalcanal Campaign; Chinese Civil War; Korean War: Battle of Inchon; Second Battle of Seoul; Battle of Chosin Reservoir; Vietnam War: Operation Pipestone Canyon
- Awards: Legion of Merit (2); Commendation Medal

Herbert Lloyd Wilkerson (31 October 1919 – 11 October 2021) was a United States Marine Corps major general. A veteran of three wars, he was most noted for his service as commanding officer, 1st Marine Regiment during Vietnam War and later as commanding general, 3rd Marine Division.

== Early career and World War II ==
Herbert L. Wilkerson was born on 31 October 1919, in Troy, Tennessee, as the son of local farmer Fred C. and Susan Ethel Wilkerson. His father died, when he was only 14 years of age and the 67-acre family farm was lost. Herbert's mother resorted to domestic work to keep the family afloat. Together with the support and assistance of Masonic Brothers of his father, Herbert and his younger sister were able to complete the Erskine College in Due West, South Carolina.

During his time at the college, Wilkerson served as editor-in-chief of the Erskine Mirror, which was awarded journalistic honors during his tenure. He graduated in June 1941 with Bachelor of Arts degree in English and Mathematics and accepted a job as an inspector for the Retail Credit Company in Columbia and Charleston, South Carolina.

Following the United States' entry into World War II in December 1941, he enlisted in the United States Marine Corps Reserve as private on 28 January 1942, and was ordered to the boot camp at Parris Island, South Carolina. After five weeks of intensive training, Wilkerson was ordered to Camp Lejeune, North Carolina, where he was attached to the Headquarters and Service Company, 7th Marine Regiment, 1st Marine Division.

He was promoted to the rank of private first class and served as orderly and driver for regimental commander, Colonel James W. Webb. Wilkerson sailed in that capacity to Pacific area at the end of March 1942 and was then stationed in Apia, British Samoa and subsequently went ashore on Guadalcanal in September of that year. Following the relieving of Webb on 20 September 1942, Wilkerson was transferred to the regiment's 1st Battalion under famous Lieutenant Colonel Chesty Puller and participated as a rifleman in the actions along the Matanikau River. He quickly reached the rank of corporal and served as a squad leader on Guadalcanal until January 1943, when he sailed with the rest of the regiment to Melbourne, Australia for rest and refit.

Wilkerson returned to the United States in mid-1943 and assumed duty with the Marine Recruiting Station in Pocatello, Idaho. During his service there, he met his wife, Jeane Coffin, a daughter of deceased Congressman Thomas C. Coffin. He returned to Camp Lejeune, North Carolina in July 1944, where he was promoted to the rank of platoon sergeant and received Marine Corps Good Conduct Medal for his enlisted service.

He was selected for the Non-Commissioned Officer Screening Course to determine whether he was suitable for officer training. After five months of screening, Wilkerson was ordered to the Platoon Leaders Course at Marine Corps Schools, Quantico, Virginia, which he completed on 25 April 1945, and was commissioned as a second lieutenant in the Reserves.

== Postwar career ==
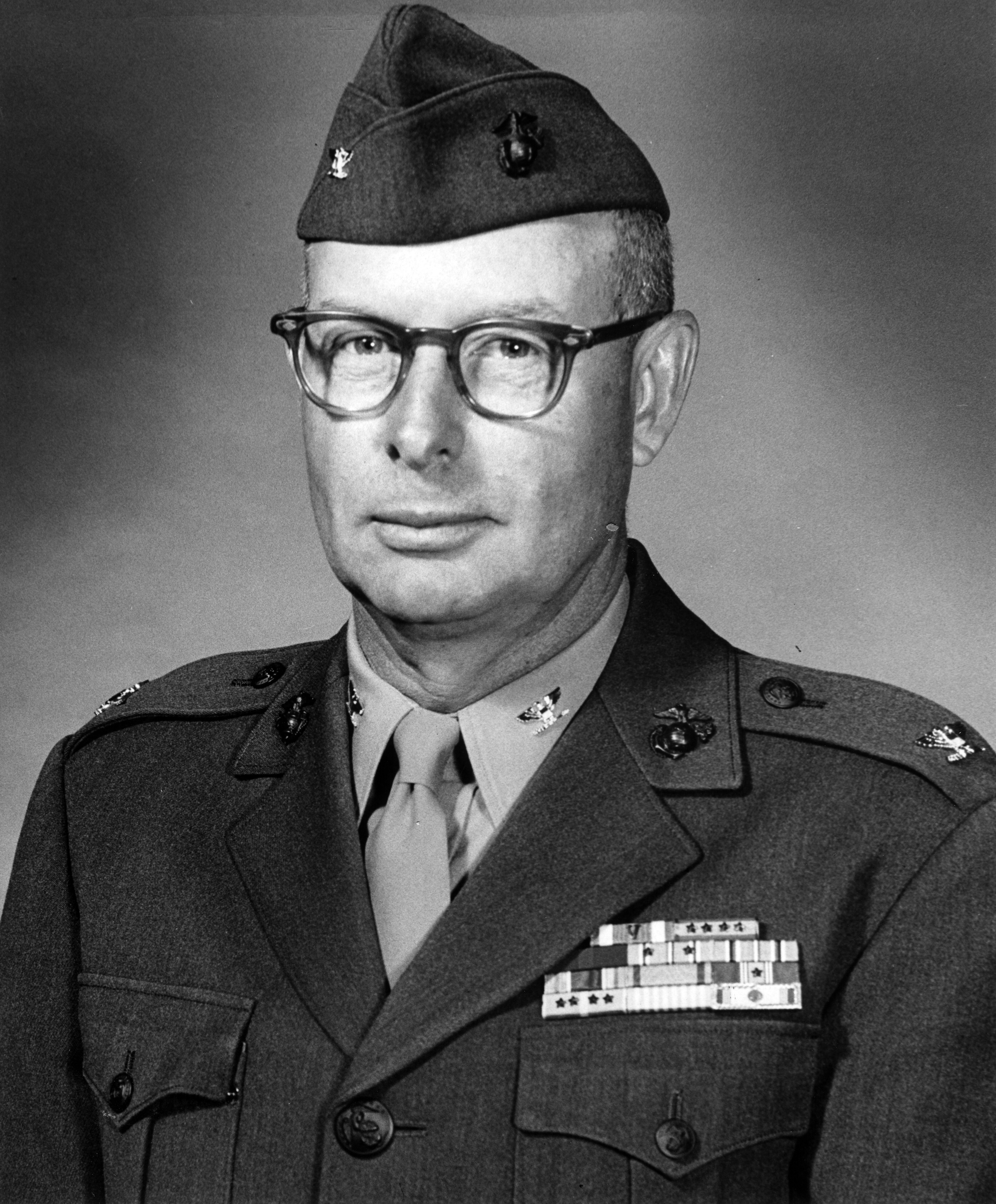
Wilkerson as Colonel in December 1967.

Following the war, Wilkerson returned to the Pacific theater and took part in the occupation of North China during Chinese Civil War. He was later integrated into the regular Marine Corps and promoted to first lieutenant. Wilkerson served with the Marine detachments on Guam and San Francisco, before he rejoined the 1st Marine Division at Camp Pendleton, California.

Following the start of the Korean War, Wilkerson was attached to the 5th Marine Regiment under Colonel Raymond Murray and embarked for overseas service. He served as a rifle company executive officer and participated in the Inchon Landing, Recapture of Seoul and Battle of Chosin Reservoir. Wilkerson was later transferred to the headquarters staff of 5th Marine Regiment and remained in Korea until the summer of 1951. For his service in that country, Wilkerson was decorated with the Navy Commendation Medal with Combat "V".

Upon his return to the United States, he was ordered to the Junior Course at the Amphibious Warfare School, Marine Corps Schools, Quantico, which he completed in November 1951. He then served at the Headquarters Marine Corps in Washington, D.C., and was promoted to captain on 25 June 1952.

He was ordered back to Camp Lejeune, North Carolina, in early 1955 and assumed command of Company A, 1st Battalion, 8th Marines, 2nd Marine Division. Upon his promotion to major on 1 July 1955, Wilkerson was appointed 1st Battalion operations officer and later assumed command of 2nd Division Non-commissioned Officer School. He departed Camp Lejeune in 1957 and traveled back to Korea, where he served as the intelligence and operations advisor to the commandant of the Korean Marine Corps. During that tour he assisted in establishing an Armed Forces Staff College for the Republic of Korea and prepared the curricular guidance for the ground and naval forces instruction.

Wilkerson was later ordered to the staff of the commander-in-chief, Pacific Fleet under Admiral Herbert G. Hopwood as an intelligence officer and remained in that capacity until he was appointed head, Regular Officer Procurement Section at Headquarters Marine Corps.

In August 1961, Wilkerson was ordered to the academic staff of Duke University and served as the Marine officer instructor with the Naval ROTC unit until his promotion to lieutenant colonel on 1 July 1962. He was subsequently ordered to the Armed Forces Staff College in Norfolk, Virginia, where he graduated in January 1963. Wilkerson then served as the commanding officer, 1st Recruit Training Battalion until the summer of 1966, when he was appointed executive officer, Recruit Training Regiment at Parris Island, South Carolina.

Wilkerson rejoined the staff of 2nd Marine Division at Camp Lejeune in summer 1967 and served under Major General Ormond R. Simpson as assistant chief of staff for operations (G-3) until June 1968. While in this capacity, he participated in the amphibious exercises at Vieques, Puerto Rico, and Roosevelt Roads Naval Station. He was promoted to colonel in December 1967 and departed the 2nd Division in June 1968. He then entered the Army War College in Washington, D.C., and graduated in June 1969.

== Vietnam War ==
Wilkerson received his orders for combat deployment to South Vietnam in August 1969 and assumed command of the 1st Marine Regiment. He succeeded Colonel Charles S. Robertson during the ongoing Operation Pipestone Canyon with main goal to clear the Go Noi Island in Quảng Nam Province. The operation lasted until the end of October and Wilkerson's regiment launched vigorous patrol, ambush, and cordon and search operations in the area.

He remained in the command of the 1st Marines until 9 February 1970, when he was relieved by Colonel Edward A. Wilcox and transferred to the headquarters, III Marine Amphibious Force in Da Nang. Wilkerson then served as deputy assistant chief of staff for operations (G-3) until 16 June 1970, when he was appointed assistant chief of staff for operations. In this capacity, he was responsible for the planning of III MAF combat operations.

He completed his tour of duty in Vietnam on 8 July 1970, and departed for the United States under the military's rotation policy. For his service in South Vietnam, Wilkerson was decorated Legion of Merit with Combat "V" and also received Vietnam Gallantry Cross with Star and Vietnam Armed Forces Honor Medal, 1st Class.

== Later career ==
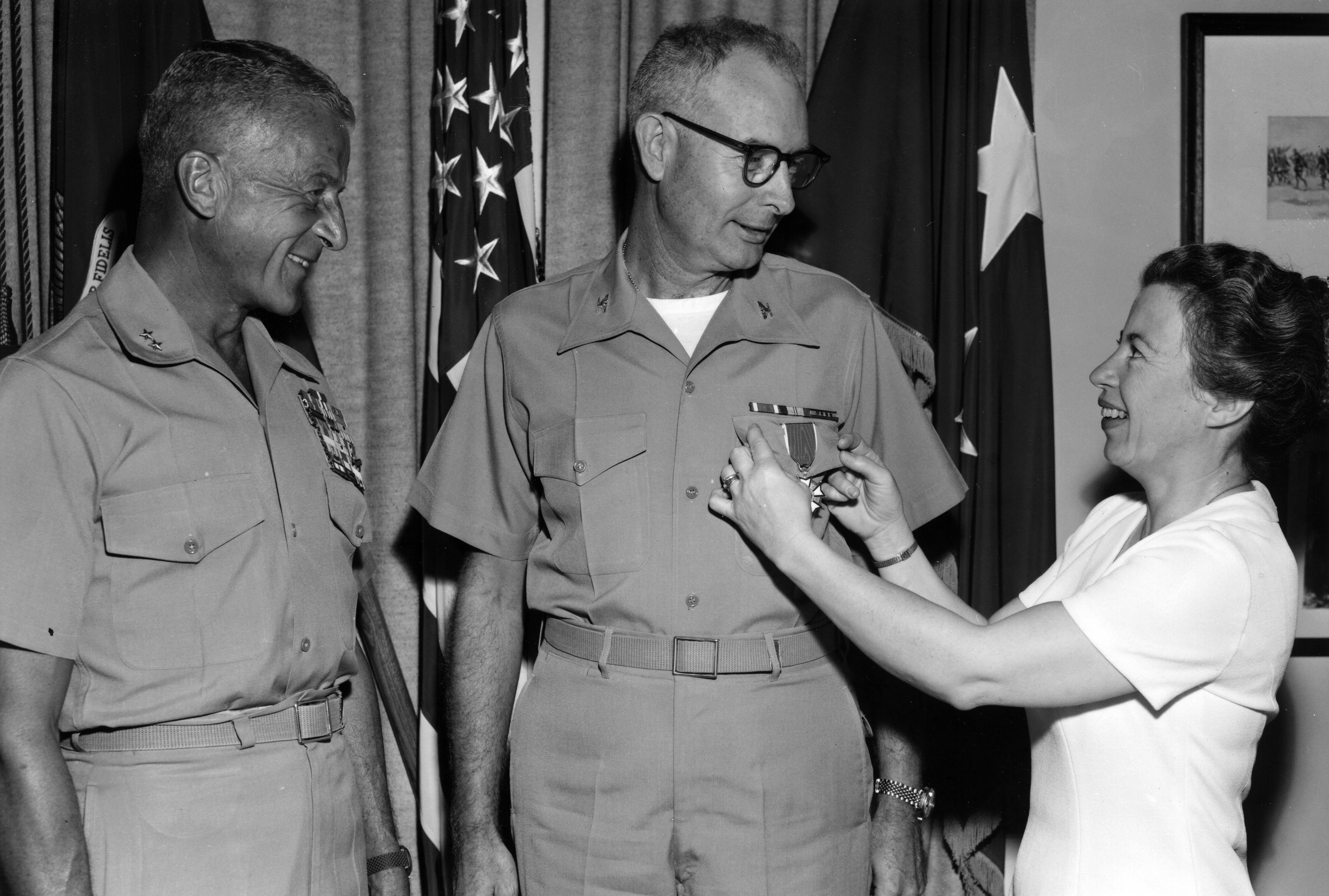
Wilkerson's award ceremony of Legion of Merit for his service in Vietnam. Commanding general, Camp Lejeune, Major General Rathvon M. Tompkins (left) and Wilkerson's wife Jeanne looks on.

Upon his return to the United States, Wilkerson was ordered again to Camp Lejeune, where he assumed duty as Base Deputy Chief of Staff for Personnel under Major General Rathvon M. Tompkins. He remained in that capacity until Christmas, when he was appointed chief of staff of the base.

Wilkerson continued in that capacity under Major General Carl A. Youngdale and following Youngdale's retirement in June 1972, Wilkerson was appointed interim commander of the base. He was promoted to the rank of brigadier general on 1 July 1972, and held command of Camp Lejeune until the end of August 1973. During his tenure there, Wilkerson faced several difficulties like black/white problems or the overall quality of personnel, which he described as the lowest in his career.

He also faced the problem of racial segregation while at Marine Corps Camp Lejeune. The City of Jacksonville, where the Marine base is located, constructed the Beacham Apartments in 1972–73 over on the other side of the city near Camp Geiger and the Marine Corps Air Station New River. A black Marine would go in and be refused because of "no vacancies." A white Marine would follow the black and ask for and be approved to rent the same accommodations the black had asked for five minutes earlier.

Wilkerson reported the situation to the Commandant of the Marine Corps, Robert E. Cushman Jr., and following the investigation, he issued the order to place Beacham out of bounds to all military personnel not already living there. The managers of Beacham Apartments were afraid of bankruptcy and sought an audience with Wilkerson. They were all ready to comply and Wilkerson established a set of monitoring conditions for Beacham to demonstrate good faith before the off limits could be lifted. However, he was succeeded by Major General Robert D. Bohn on 22 August 1973, who completed lifting the off limits.

Lloyd Wilkerson was subsequently ordered to the Headquarters Marine Corps in Washington, D.C., for duty as deputy chief of staff for research, development and studies. While in this capacity, he was promoted to the rank of major general on 20 March 1975. He was ordered to Okinawa, Japan, in August 1975 and assumed command of 3rd Marine Division. Wilkerson also concurrently commanded III Marine Amphibious Force.

He was ordered back to the United States in July 1976 and assumed his final assignment as director, Personnel Management Division/assistant deputy chief of staff for manpower. Wilkerson remained in that assignment until his retirement on 31 May 1978, and received his second Legion of Merit.

== Retirement ==
During the last years of his Marine career, Wilkerson served as a member of the board of directors of the Erskine College alumni association between 1974 and 1977. Upon his retirement from the military in 1978, he served as a member of the board of counselors from 1977 until 1981 when he was appointed to the Erskine Board of trustees to fill the last year of an unexpired term. Wilkerson then held a variety of positions including a full term with the Erskine College board of trustees and was later elected as chairman of the board in 1985. He held that position until the summer of 1987 and received the Algernon Sydney Sullivan Award on 18 May 1985, the Alumni Distinguished Service Award in 1988 and an honorary Doctor of Laws degree in 1996.

Due to his military experiences, Wilkerson was appointed by the governor of North Carolina, Jim Hunt, to the newly formed Governor's Commission for Military Affairs. He held this position between April 1982 and October 1991.

Wilkerson later served on the board of directors of the Jacksonville Rotary Club, on the board of the Coastal Carolina Community College Foundation, Inc., as a trustee of Onslow County Public Library, and as a member of the Jacksonville Board of Realtors.

== Personal life and death ==
Wilkerson married Jeanne Coffin on 25 April 1945, at the Post Chapel, Marine Corps Schools, Quantico, Virginia, on the day of his commissioning. Their children are: Major General Thomas Lloyd Wilkerson, USMC (Ret.), Naval Academy graduate and CEO of The U. S. Naval Institute; Richard Nathan Wilkerson, chairman and president of Michelin North America; and Fred C. Wilkerson, a graduate of the New England Culinary Institute. They have two grandchildren; Ashley Wilkerson and Richard Wilkerson, the children of Richard Nathan Wilkerson and two great-grandchildren; Benjamin Reich and Emily Reich who are the children of Ashley.

Wilkerson died on 11 October 2021, in Greensboro, North Carolina, at the age of 101.

== Decorations ==
Below is the ribbon bar of Major General Herbert L. Wilkerson:

| 1st Row | Legion of Merit with Combat "V" and one 5/16" Gold Star | | | |
| 2nd Row | Navy Commendation Medal with Combat "V" | Combat Action Ribbon | Navy Presidential Unit Citation with four stars | Navy Unit Commendation |
| 3rd Row | Marine Corps Good Conduct Medal | China Service Medal | American Campaign Medal | Asiatic-Pacific Campaign Medal with two 3/16 inch service stars |
| 4th Row | World War II Victory Medal | National Defense Service Medal with one star | Korean Service Medal with four 3/16 inch service stars | Vietnam Service Medal with two 3/16 inch service stars |
| 5th Row | Korean Order of Military Merit, 4th Class | Vietnam Gallantry Cross with Star | Vietnam Armed Forces Honor Medal, 1st Class | Republic of Korea Presidential Unit Citation |
| 6th Row | Vietnam Gallantry Cross Unit Citation | Vietnam Civil Actions Medal Unit Citation | United Nations Korea Medal | Vietnam Campaign Medal |

== See also ==
- List of 3rd Marine Division Commanders

Military offices
| Preceded by Kenneth J. Houghton | Commanding General, 3rd Marine Division; 14 August 1975 – 19 July 1976 | Succeeded by George W. Smith |
| Preceded by Carl A. Youngdale | Commanding General, Camp Lejeune; 1 July 1972 – 22 August 1973 | Succeeded by Robert D. Bohn |
