= Carl A. Youngdale =

United States Marine Corps general (1912–1993)

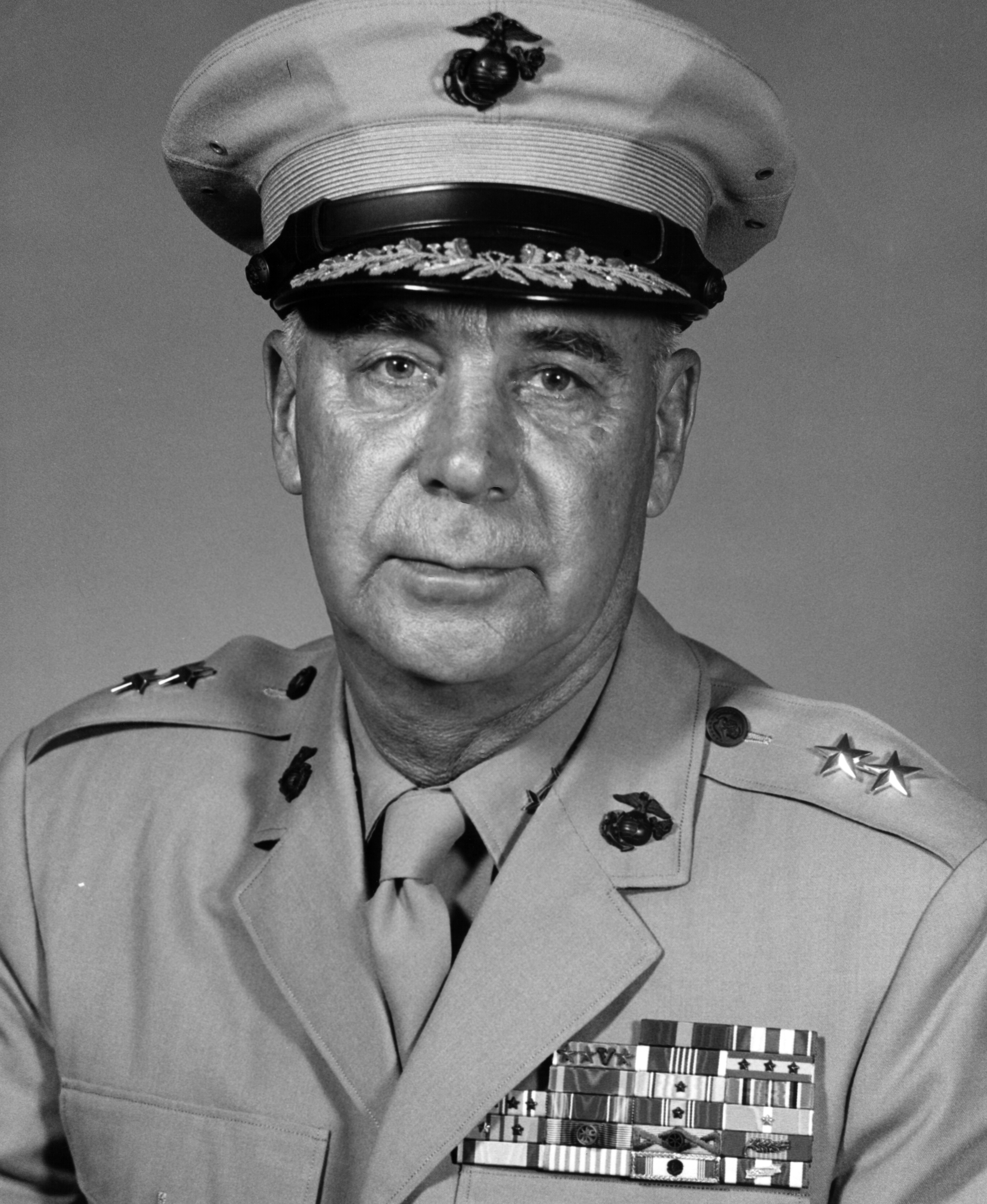
- MG Carl A. Youngdale, USMC
- Born: June 23, 1912; Gowrie, Iowa, US
- Died: March 8, 1993 (aged 80); Virginia Beach, Virginia, US
- Burial place: Arlington National Cemetery
- Military career
- Allegiance: United States of America
- Branch: United States Marine Corps
- Service years: 1936–1972
- Rank: Major general
- Service number: 0-5454
- Commands: Camp Lejeune; 1st Marine Division; 1st Marine Brigade; 11th Marine Regiment; 10th Marine Regiment
- Conflicts: World War II; Battle of Kwajalein; Battle of Saipan; Battle of Tinian; Battle of Iwo Jima; Korean War; Battle of Inchon; Second Battle of Seoul; Battle of Chosin Reservoir; Battles of Wonju; Vietnam War; Operation Mameluke Thrust; Operation Allen Brook; Tet Offensive; Operation Maui Peak; Operation Meade River; Operation Taylor Common
- Awards: Distinguished Service Medal (2); Silver Star; Legion of Merit (6); Army Commendation Medal

Carl Albert Youngdale (June 23, 1912 – March 8, 1993) was a highly decorated officer of the United States Marine Corps with the rank of major general. As an artillery officer, he took part in the three major conflicts of the 20th century and completed his 36 years career as commanding general of Camp Lejeune.

== Early career ==
Youngdale was born on June 23, 1912, in Gowrie, Iowa, and attended the consolidated high school in near Harcourt, Iowa. He then attended Iowa State University in Ames, Iowa, and graduated in June 1936 with a Bachelor of Science degree. While at university, Youngdale was a member of Reserve Officers' Training Corps unit and trained as a field artillery officer. He resigned his commission in order to accept an appointment as a second lieutenant in the Marine Corps on July 10, 1936.

Youngdale was then ordered to the Basic School at the Philadelphia Navy Yard for further officer training and completed the instruction in March 1937. He was subsequently attached to the Marine detachment at Portsmouth Naval Prison, New Hampshire. Youngdale served as a detachment officer until June 1938, when he was transferred to the 1st Marine Brigade at Quantico, Virginia. He was appointed an infantry platoon leader for "D" Company, 1st Battalion, 5th Marines.

He later served as an artillery officer with "A" Battery, 1st Battalion, 10th Marines and received a promotion to the rank of first lieutenant in July 1939. A tour of sea duties was ordered in July 1940, when Youngdale was appointed commanding officer of Marine detachment aboard the transport ship, USS Henderson and took part in the transporting of men and cargo between California, Hawaii and China.

== World War II ==
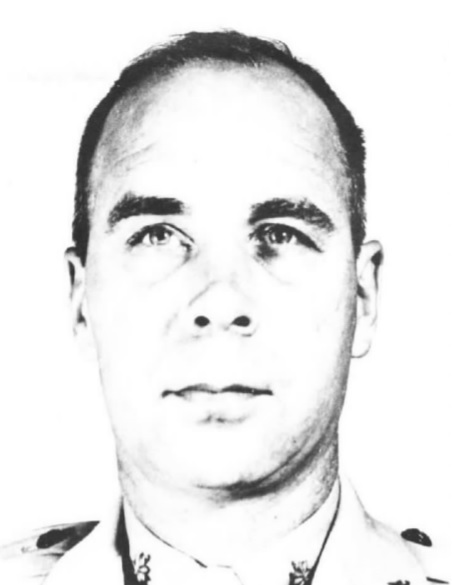
Youngdale as Lieutenant colonel during World War II

When the Japanese Attack on Pearl Harbor occurred on December 7, 1941, the Henderson was outbound from Pearl Harbor. The skipper of Henderson, Charles F. Martin feared a Japanese air or submarine attack to his vulnerable vessel, so he ordered radio silence and sailed via Alaska to California in order to avoid contact with the enemy. Upon the arrival of the Henderson at San Francisco a few weeks later, Youngdale was promoted to the rank of captain in January 1942 and participated in the several voyages with troops and supplies to South Pacific.

Youngdale was ordered to the Marine training center at Camp Elliott, California in August 1942 and was promoted to the rank of major. He served first as officer in charge of the local Artillery School and subsequently as operations officer under Brigadier General Matthew H. Kingman. To improve his knowledge of artillery warfare, Youngdale was ordered for instruction to the Army Field Artillery School at Fort Sill, Oklahoma in April 1943 and graduated three months later.

He was subsequently ordered to Camp Pendleton, California, where he supervised the activation of the 4th Battalion, 14th Marine Artillery Regiment. The 14th Marines were designated the main artillery component of the 4th Marine Division under Major General Harry Schmidt and later relocated to Camp Dunlap for further training. During training there, Youngdale got word of his upcoming combat deployment to the Pacific area – Marshall Islands.

=== Roi Namur ===
The main goal of the landing for 4th Marine Division, was to secure the Roi Namur atoll, center of air activity in the Marshall Islands. With the securing of that atoll, allied forces get a new base for future offensives in the Pacific. Youngdale and his 4th battalion was ordered to deploy his 75mm Howitzers on the island of Melu, once it was secured by 25th Marines under Colonel Samuel C. Cumming.

Youngale made it ashore without losing any guns, but arrived too late to support Lieutenant Colonel Justice M. Chambers' 3d Battalion, 25th Marines landing on the far side of the lagoon as originally planned. The 4th Battalion then provided support fire for advancing units of 1st Battalion, 23rd Marines and after the island was declared secured, it was transported to Maui, Hawaii for rest and refit. Youngdale was promoted to the rank of lieutenant colonel in March 1944.

=== Saipan and Tinian ===
Lieutenant Colonel Youngdale landed under heavy enemy fire on late June 15, 1944 on Blue Beach 2 and formed a small group consisted from battalion reconnaissance party, which landed earlier that day. He led his group to the outskirts of village Chalan Kanoa and deployed battalion command post there. Youngdale regrouped the battalion and although not completely dug in, 4th battalion began shooting that evening. His unit later provided support fire during the attack on Aslito Airfield and helped repelled several Japanese counterattacks.

Saipan was declared secured on 9 July and 4th Battalion, 14th Marines remained there until the beginning of August 1944. During the subsequent amphibious landing on Tinian, Youngdale and his battalion landed on the island on the last day of the campaign and saw a little action. For his leadership of the 4th battalion, Youngdale was decorated with the Legion of Merit with Combat "V".

=== Iwo Jima ===
After almost six months of training and preparation for future combat deployment on Maui, 4th Marine Division sailed back to the Pacific area for the Battle of Iwo Jima at the beginning of January 1945. Youngdale led reconnaissance party ashore on February 19, 1945, but his advance was halted by heavy artillery and mortars which continued to place heavy concentrations on the party when it hit the beach. He exposed himself to the intense and accurate fire and subsequently reorganized and dispersed his group in order to present smaller targets to the enemy and, although several of his men sustained wounds, undoubtedly saved several lives by his action. Crawling forward in the face of machine-gun fire, he located a position with a better defilade, returned to the original location and led his men forward. He then made a reconnaissance of the designated battalion position area through heavy mine fields to determine the locations for his firing batteries.

When the commander 3rd Battalion, Lt.Col. Robert E. MacFarlane, was hit by enemy fire on February 23, Youngdale was appointed temporary commander of that battalion. He remained in that capacity until March 10 of that year and subsequently resumed his duties with 4th Battalion. For his service on Iwo Jima, Youngdale was decorated with the Silver Star for bravery.

== Postwar service ==
Youngdale was appointed 14th Marines Executive officer under Colonel Randall M. Victory in May 1945 and spent next five months on Maui, Hawaii. The regiment was subsequently ordered to the United States and completely deactivated on November 20, 1945, at Camp Pendleton, California. After almost two years overseas, Youngdale got one-month leave for Christmas and then reported for duty as executive officer of Field Artillery School within Marine Corps Schools, Quantico.

He served in that capacity until September 1947 and then attended Senior Course, from which he graduated in May 1948. Youngdale was then appointed Instructor-Inspector of 2nd Marine Reserve Artillery Battalion (105mm Howitzers) in Los Angeles, California and spent next two years with peacetime service there.

=== Korea ===
His peacetime duties ended in August 1950, when he was ordered to South Korea as executive officer of 11th Marine Regiment under Colonel James H. Brower. Youngdale subsequently commanded regimental fire direction center during the landing at Inchon, recapture of Seoul and Chosin Reservoir campaign. He was decorated with the Legion of Merit with Combat "V" for his service during these campaigns.

Following the liver infection of Colonel Brower at the beginning of December 1950, Youngdale replaced him as commanding officer of 11th Marines and 1st Marine Division Artillery Officer. His first duty as regimental commanding officer, was to train and reorganize the regiment after the withdrawal from Hungnam.

At the beginning of January 1951, Youngdale led his regiment to the vicinity of Pohang and coordinated the support fire for 1st Marine Division units during the blocking of communists attacks. The 11th Marines later took part in the fighting around Andong and Yongdok and this action continued until mid-February. Youngdale later commanded his regiment during Wonju campaign. He was succeeded by Joseph L. Winecoff at the beginning of March 1951 and also received his second Legion of Merit with Combat "V" for his service as regimental commander.

=== Stateside duty ===
Youngdale was then transferred to the staff of commander in chief, Pacific Fleet under Admiral Arthur W. Radford, where he served at the headquarters on Hawaii until July 1953. When President Eisenhower appointed admiral Radford to the capacity of Chairman of the Joint Chiefs of Staff in August 1953, Youngdale followed him as Marine Corps liaison officer to the secretariat of that staff.

While in Washington, Youngdale was ordered for senior course at National War College in July 1955 and graduated in June of the following year. His next duty took him to Paris, France where he served as Chief of Operations Branch, Operations Division within United States European Command under General Lauris Norstad. During his two-year assignment there, Youngdale demonstrated great skills and received Army Commendation Medal.

Following his return stateside in August 1958, Youngdale was ordered to Camp Lejeune, North Carolina and attached to the 2nd Marine Division under Major General Joseph C. Burger. He served as Division Chief of Staff until the beginning of December 1959, when assumed command of 10th Marine Regiment. Youngdale also served as assistant division commander from February to June 1961 and during his whole tenure with 2nd Division, he was stationed at Camp Lejeune. He was promoted to the rank of brigadier general in August 1961.

He was subsequently appointed Assistant Chief of Staff for Intelligence at Headquarters Marine Corps in Washington, D.C. and served in that capacity until May 1962, when he was appointed assistant chief of staff for operations for a brief period before he was appointed assistant to the deputy chief of staff for plans and programs (joint matters) in July 1962.

=== Vietnam war era ===
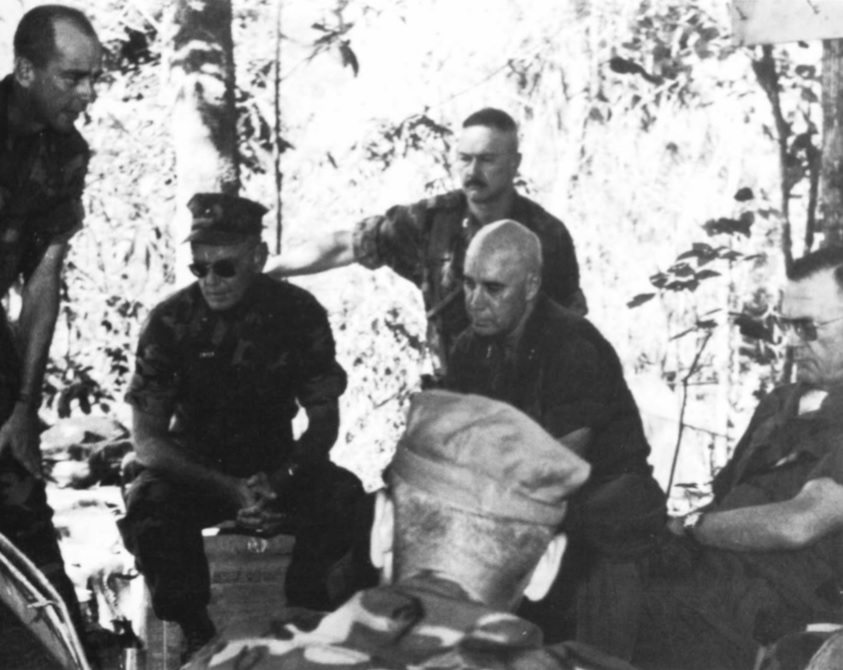
MG Youngdale (seated center without cap) during briefing on use of Scout Dogs during Operation Taylor Common with Commandant Leonard F. Chapman Jr. (extreme right) and BG Ross T. Dwyer (seated with sunglasses), Vietnam, 1968

Youngdale was transferred to Marine Corps Air Station Kaneohe Bay, Hawaii, in mid-February 1963 and relieved Brigadier general Keith B. McCutcheon as commanding general of 1st Marine Brigade. His brigade served as the "middleweight" global crisis response force and was able to "operate independently, as a service component, or to lead a Joint Task Force.

With the worsening situation in South Vietnam, Youngdale was transferred to Saigon, South Vietnam, and appointed assistant chief of staff for intelligence within Military Assistance Command, Vietnam under General William Westmoreland. Youngdale's presence on the Westmoreland's staff ensured a Marine voice in U.S. military planning at the Saigon level. He served in that capacity until the end of July 1965 and was promoted to the rank of major general at the same time. Youngdale was also decorated with Navy Distinguished Service Medal for his staff work.

Upon his return to the United States, Youngdale was appointed deputy chief of staff for administration at Headquarters Marine Corps. He then served as inspector general of the Marine Corps from August 1966 until May 1968 and received his fourth Legion of Merit for his service during this period.

His second tour of duty in Vietnam began at the end of June 1968, when he was ordered to Da Nang to succeed Major General Donn J. Robertson as commanding general of 1st Marine Division. One of his first orders was to review defense plans for Da Nang TAOR and then finished the ongoing search and destroy operations Mameluke Thrust and Allen Brook.

In mid-August 1968, Viet Cong (VC) began attacking forward Combined Action Platoons and Youngdale quickly recognized this as the 3rd phase of the Tet Offensive and ordered the reinforcing of the sectors which appeared to be most in danger. He subsequently launched the Operation Sussex Bay, which blocked the withdrawal of VC forces from Da Nang area.

During the end of September 1968, People's Army of Vietnam (PAVN) 2nd Infantry Division launched attack on the Thường Ðức Camp, southwest of Da Nang and overran two camps outposts. Youngdale subsequently launched Operation Maui Peak in order to relieve the siege around Thường Ðức and declared the area secured on October 19.

In November 1968, Youngdale also coordinated the Operation Meade River – search and destroy mission, before he was appointed Deputy Commander of III Marine Amphibious Force (III MAF) under Lieutenant General Robert E. Cushman.

Because of the lack of helicopters for Marine operations, new III MAF commander, Lieutenant General Herman Nickerson Jr. ordered Youngdale to establish a special board, which was tasked with the examination of use and command and control of Marine Corps helicopter assets. Youngdale was relieved by Major General George S. Bowman Jr. in July 1969 and ordered back to the States. For his service with 1st Marine Division and III MAF, he was decorated with his second Navy Distinguished Service Medal. He also received several decorations by the Government of South Vietnam.

Youngdale then assumed duties as deputy commander of Fleet Marine Force, Atlantic under Lieutenant General Frederick E. Leek and spent next two years at the headquarters at Naval Station Norfolk, Virginia. He received his fifth Legion of Merit for his service in this capacity.

His final assignment was the commanding general of Camp Lejeune from June 1971, when he was responsible for the amphibious training of Marine units on the east coast. Youngdale retired from the Marine Corps on June 30, 1972, after 36 years of active service and received his sixth Legion of Merit during the retirement ceremony.

== Retirement ==
Following his retirement from the Marine Corps, Youngdale settled in Virginia Beach, Virginia, and died there on March 8, 1993. He is buried at Arlington National Cemetery together with his wife Jessica McElroy Youngdale. They had together two daughters Patricia Jean Chesney and Susan Jane Paulson and one son, Carl A. Youngdale Jr.

== Decorations ==
A complete list of the general's medals and decorations include:

1st Row	Navy Distinguished Service Medal with one 5/16" Gold Star	Silver Star	Legion of Merit with Combat "V" with one 5/16" Silver Star (six awards)	Army Commendation Medal
2nd Row	Navy Presidential Unit Citation with three stars	Navy Unit Commendation	American Defense Service Medal with Fleet Clasp	American Campaign Medal
3rd Row	Asiatic-Pacific Campaign Medal with four 3/16 inch service stars	World War II Victory Medal	National Defense Service Medal with one star	Korean Service Medal with one 3/16 inch silver service star
4th Row	Vietnam Service Medal with one 3/16 inch silver and one bronze service stars	Vietnam National Order of Vietnam, Officer	Vietnam Army Distinguished Service Order, 1st Class	Vietnam Gallantry Cross with Palm
5th Row	Korean Order of Military Merit Chung Mu	United Nations Korea Medal	Republic of Korea Presidential Unit Citation	Vietnam Campaign Medal

== See also ==
- Battle of Iwo Jima
- 1st Marine Division
- List of 1st Marine Division Commanders

Military offices
Preceded by Rathvon M. Tompkins	Commanding General of the Camp Lejeune; June 30, 1971 - June 30, 1972	Succeeded by Herbert L. Wilkerson
Preceded by Donn J. Robertson	Commanding General of the 1st Marine Division; June 27, 1968 - December 20, 1968	Succeeded by Ormond R. Simpson
Preceded by Keith B. McCutcheon	Commanding General of the 1st Marine Brigade; February 15, 1963 - January 24, 1964	Succeeded by Marion E. Carl
