= 2nd Battalion, 25th Marines =

US reserve infantry unit

1st Marine Corps District
- Part of United States Marine Corps

Location
- Coordinates: 40°43′48.4536″N 73°36′52.29″W

2nd Battalion, 25th Marines
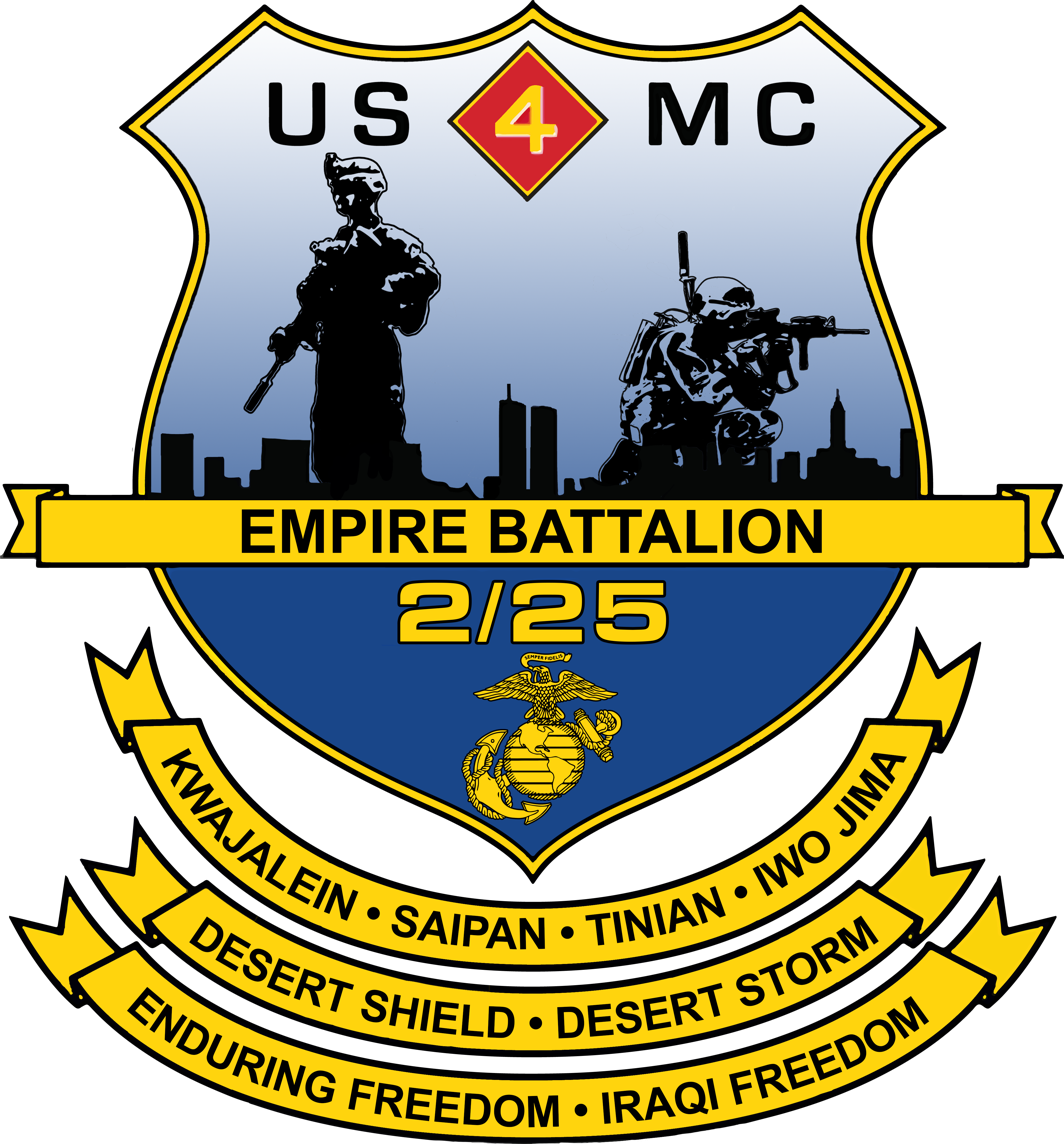
- 2d Battalion, 25th Marines insignia
- Active: 1 May 1943 – 31 October 1945; 1 July 1962 – present
- Country: United States of America
- Branch: United States Marine Corps
- Type: Infantry battalion
- Role: Locate, close with and destroy the enemy with fire and maneuver
- Size: 1,000
- Part of: 25th Marine Regiment; 4th Marine Division
- Garrison/HQ: Brooklyn, New York
- Nickname: "Empire Battalion"
- Mottos: Vis Pugnare, Constantia Vincere "Power to Fight - Always to Triumph"
- Engagements: World War II; Pacific Theater; Battle of Kwajalein; Battle of Saipan; Battle of Tinian; Battle of Iwo Jima; Operation Desert Storm; War on terror; Operation Enduring Freedom; Operation Iraqi Freedom

Commanders
- Current commander: Lt.Col. David A. Kelm Jr.
- Notable commanders: Lewis C. Hudson

The 2nd Battalion, 25th Marines (2/25) is a reserve infantry battalion in the United States Marine Corps.

Headquartered in Brooklyn, New York, it has units located throughout the Mid-Atlantic States. It consists of approximately 1,000 Marines and sailors under the command of the 25th Marine Regiment and the 4th Marine Division.

== Current units ==
Name	Location
Headquarters and Services Company	Brooklyn, New York
Echo Company	Harrisburg, Pennsylvania
Fox Company	Plainville, Connecticut
Golf Company	Picatinny Arsenal, New Jersey
Weapons Company	Brooklyn, New York

== Mission ==
The 2nd Battalion, 25th Marines, trains qualified units or individuals that reinforce the active components of the Marine Corps in the event of war, as well as a national emergency or any other threat to national security.

== History ==
=== World War II ===
The battalion was first activated on 1 May 1943, at Marine Corps Base Camp Lejeune, North Carolina, as the 2nd Battalion, 25th Marines. It was relocated during August–September 1943 to Camp Pendleton, California. In September 1943, 2/25 was assigned to the 4th Marine Division. The battalion was deployed to combat during January 1944 to Kwajalein Atoll, Marshall Islands. It participated in the following World War II campaigns: Kwajalein, Saipan, Tinian and Iwo Jima while under the command of Lieutenant Colonel Lewis C. Hudson. In October 1945, it relocated to Camp Pendleton, California and was deactivated on 31 October 1945.

==== Roi Namur ====
The 25th Marines were transferred to the West Coast in August 1943 the 2nd battalion sailed for San Diego via Panama Canal. They arrived on September 10 and marched to the newest marine base, Camp Pendleton and joined 4th Marine Division. All division's units began preparing for the first combat deployment in Pacific – Kwajalein Operation.

The 25th Marines took part in the landing exercise on San Clemente Island at the beginning of January 1944 subsequently left San Diego on January 13. They reached Hawaii on January 22 and then sailed to Kwajalein Atoll in the Marshall Islands. The main goal was to secure the Atoll and get that a new base for future offensives. The 25th Marine Regiment was designated a part of the Northern Landing Force, which took part in the capturing of Roi (Roi has the Runway, Namur {note before the Americans took the two islands from the Japanese it was two islands, Roi to the East, Namur to the West} Namur had the Ammunition bunkers). Roi was the center of air activity in the Marshall Islands.

The main objective for 25th Marines was the capturing of the small off-shore islands, which should served as artillery sites for fire support of advancing units. The 2nd battalion were tasked the capturing of Ennubir Island, site of the main Japanese radio transmitter, and power plant for the islands of Roi and Namur (now Roi-Namur) The battalion at the dawn of January 31 and captured the Island almost without resistance. The 2nd Battalion, 25th Marines later secured all eight islands, but all without resistance. The Kwajalein operation ended with success on February 3, 1944, and 25th Marines sailed for Maui, Hawaii for rest and refit at the end of February of that year.

==== Saipan and Tinian ====
2nd battalion then took part in the landing maneuvers and preparations for the next campaign, Saipan. They finally sailed back to the war zone on May 25 and after brief stay on Eniwetok, 25th Marines reached Saipan on June 15. The main objective of 4th Marine Division was the capture of Aslito airfield in the southern end of the island and advance north along the east coast.

Lieutenant Colonel Hudson landed with 2nd Battalion on left flank of Yellow Beach 1 in the morning of that day and half of the battalion successfully advanced inland almost 500 yards while taking cover behind the moving LVTs. The second half of 2nd battalion was pinned down on the beach by enemy mortar and machine gun fire, until allied fighter planes wiped these enemy emplacements out. The Second Battalion led the way of the regiment and took part in the attack on Aslito Airfield on June 17.

After mopping-up operations in the southern part of the Island, 2nd Battalion, 25th Marines went to the reserve on June 26 and remained there until the beginning of July. 2nd battalion were subsequently ordered to Mt. Petosukara, where repelled a furious assault of Japanese rifle company. The repeated attack on the morning of the next day was so intense that even personnel from the battalion aid station took part in the defense. An island was finally declared secured on July 9, 1944.

For general success in Marianas, an island of Tinian had to be secured, which was located southward of Saipan. Tinian was a little bit smaller than previous island, but higher quality garrison. The landing itself was commenced on July 24 2nd Battalion landed on White Beach 1 in the North of the island during the morning of that day. Hudson subsequently led his battalion in attack on enemy positions on Mt. Maga and then attacked enemy fortifications on near Mt. Lasso on July 26.

On July 28, Japanese resistance on the island fell apart except some individuals, who denied to surrender. 2nd battalion took up in the mopping-up operations and Tinian was declared secured on August 1, 1944

==== Iwo Jima ====
The right-most landing area was dominated by Japanese positions at the Quarry. The 25th Marine Regiment undertook a two-pronged attack to silence these guns. 2nd battalion on Blue beach 2 on February 19 with the orders to seize high ground located 500 yards inland. The advance of the battalion was halted by the enemy's machine gun and mortar fire, and casualties began increasing. On February 20, when the battalion was subsequently pinned down again, Lieutenant Colonel Hudson repeatedly exposed himself to enemy fire in order to supervise and coordinate the attack. Although suffering painful wounds, he refused medical aid until all other casualties had been given treatment, continuing to supervise the attack until replaced by a new battalion commander, Lt.Col. James Taul. The most arduous task left to the 25th Marines was the taking of the Motoyama Plateau with its distinctive Hill 382 and Turkey knob and the area in between referred to as the Amphitheater. This formed the basis of what came to be known as the "meatgrinder". During this time the 25th Marines experienced some of the worst fighting of the whole pacific war suffering heavy losses. They used flamethrowers, Grenades, and tanks to flush the Japanese out of the caves and bunkers from which they fought. The 25th Marines were relieved in late March 1945 and sent back to Maui, Hawaii.

=== Post-war years ===
The battalion was reactivated on 1 July 1962, at Garden City, New York, and assigned to the 4th Marine Division, Marine Forces Reserve.

The battalion was mobilized piecemeal between November 1990 and January 1991, in support of Operation Desert Shield and Operation Desert Storm. The majority of the battalion trained at Camp Pendleton and 29 Palms, CA for possible deployment overseas, while Fox Company 2/25 deployed to the Persian Gulf and participated directly in Operations Desert Shield and Desert Storm. 2nd Platoon of Fox Company deployed as part of 5th Marine Regiment, on the 5th Marine expeditionary brigade participating in combat operations in Saudi Arabia and Kuwait, while the remainder of the company supported 2nd Marine Division operations with the 2nd Light Armored Infantry Battalion. With the cessation of hostilities in the Persian Gulf, the 2nd platoon of Fox Company was subsequently diverted to Bangladesh for participation in Operation Sea Angel, in May 1991. The battalion demobilized during March/April 1991 and returned to Garden City, New York. The elements of Fox Company that remained active returned to the Bronx, NY on 3 July 1991, just before the 4th of July weekend of 1991. These Marines were subsequently assigned to other 2/25 elements as the Fox Company headquarters was moved from its former home in New Rochelle, NY to Albany, NY during their deployment.

In September/October 1994, 2/25 participated in Operation Sea Signal in Guantanamo Bay, Cuba. In the summers of 1995 and 1996, they participated in JTF-6 Counter-drug missions in the Southwest United States. In 1997, they participated in a CAX at 29 Palms, CA. In July 1998, parts of the battalion deployed to Lithuania to participate in a CJT known as "Baltic Challenge 98". In February 1999, the battalion deployed to Norway for Operation Battle Griffin. They also participated in Operation Rescue Eagle, Romania in July 2000.

=== Global war on terror ===
The battalion was mobilized from January 2002 to January 2003 in support of Operation Enduring Freedom. It was demobilized in January 2003 and returned to Garden City, New York. In March 2003, it mobilized again in support of Operation Iraqi Freedom briefly, before demobilizing in August 2003. During the summer of 2004, the battalion was deployed to Mount Fuji, Japan for Annual Training. During the winter of 2005, it was deployed to Norway for Annual Training in support of Battle Griffin '05. In March 2005, 75 members of the battalion were deployed to Iraq as individual augments with 3rd Battalion, 25th Marines. In December of that year, more than 250 individual members of the battalion were mobilized to augment the 1st Battalion 25th Marines for deployment in Iraq.

During the summer of 2007, the battalion was joined by medical and veterinary civil affairs units and traveled to Senegal for Operation Shared Accord. The battalion split its time between training with Senegalese commandos and fire support companies and providing veterinary and medical care to the towns surrounding the training area.

In September 2008, 2/25, with individual augments from 1/25 and 3/25, the battalion was deployed to Al Anbar Province in support of Operation Iraqi Freedom. It was split into two 500 Marines "half-battalion" units to pursue separate missions: Force protection of Al Asad Air Base and counterinsurgency operations in the area around Camp Korean Village, Iraq. The battalion demobilized and returned to Garden City, New York, on 10 April 2009, after turning over the security of Al Asad Air Base to 1st Battalion, 8th Marines; the operations neighboring Camp Korean Village were turned over to elements of the 4th Assault Amphibian Battalion.

In the summer of 2010, over 400 Marines from the battalion were stationed in Mozambique to train with the local military and conducted humanitarian medical Civil Affairs in towns near the capital. The 2nd Battalion, 25th Marine regiment's partner-based training concentrated on small arms tactics and hasty mine clearing in one of the most heavily mined countries in the world.

== Members ==
- Matthew Bogdanos – former CO of Weapons Company
- Raymond W. Kelly – former operations officer
- Robert Wertz – a member of the New York State Assembly

== See also ==
- List of United States Marine Corps battalions
- Organization of the United States Marine Corps
