= Lewis C. Hudson =

U.S. Marine Corps Brigadier General

Lewis Cheatham Hudson
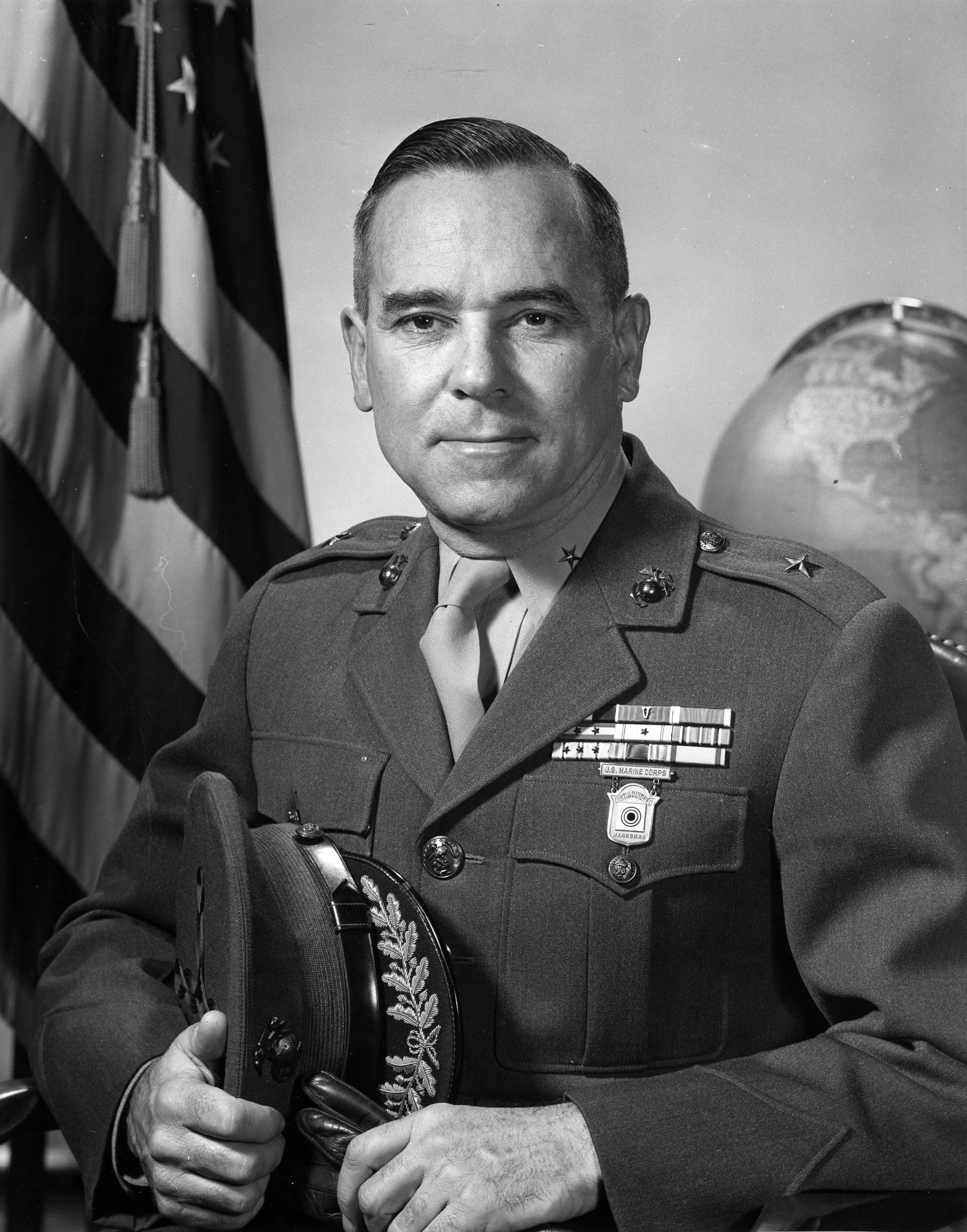
- BG Lewis C. Hudson, USMC
- Born: July 29, 1910; Memphis, Tennessee, U.S.
- Died: July 24, 2001 (aged 90); Memphis, Tennessee, U.S.
- Burial place: West Tennessee State Veterans Cemetery
- Military career
- Allegiance: United States of America
- Branch: United States Marine Corps
- Service years: 1931–1961
- Rank: Brigadier general
- Service number: 0-4641
- Commands: Troop Training Unit, Atlantic Fleet; 3rd Marine Division; 2nd Battalion, 25th Marines; 2nd Battalion, 23rd Marines
- Conflicts: World War II: Battle of Kwajalein; Battle of Saipan; Battle of Tinian; Battle of Iwo Jima; Chinese Civil War
- Awards: Navy Cross; Legion of Merit; Purple Heart

Lewis Cheatham Hudson (July 29, 1910 – July 24, 2001) was a highly decorated officer of the United States Marine Corps with the rank of brigadier general. Hudson received the Navy Cross, the United States military's second-highest decoration awarded for valor in combat, while leading 2nd Battalion, 25th Marines during Battle of Iwo Jima in February 1945. He later commanded Troop Training Unit, Atlantic Fleet or 3rd Marine Division and retired in 1961.

== Early career ==
Lewis C. Hudson was born on July 29, 1910, in Memphis, Tennessee, but his family later moved to Sherard, Mississippi, where he attended grammar school. Hudsons later moved to White Haven, Tennessee, and young Lewis attended high school there. Following the graduation in 1927, Hudson received appointment to the United States Naval Academy at Annapolis, Maryland. While at the academy, he was active in boxing, wrestling and track or captained the cross country running team. Hudson finally graduated on June 4, 1931, with bachelor's degree and was commissioned second lieutenant in the Marine Corps on the same date.

He was ordered for his officer training to the Basic School at Philadelphia Navy Yard, and following the graduation in June 1932, as an excellent shooter, Hudson was assigned to the Marine Corps Rifle and Pistol Team Squad at Marine Barracks Quantico, Virginia. In February 1933, he was ordered to the Marine barracks at Naval Station Guam and remained there until May 1935. During his time in Pacific, he was promoted to the rank of first lieutenant in December 1934. His next assignment was with Rifle and Pistol Team at Marine Corps Recruit Depot Parris Island, South Carolina, but returned to the Quantico Pistol Team in May 1936 and took part in the Quantico Rifle and Pistol Matches. Hudson later served with Wakefield Rifle and Pistol Team and also commanded Wakefield Marine Detachment.

In November 1936, Hudson was appointed commanding officer of the Marine Corps Institute at Marine Barracks, Washington, D.C., and again was involved in the pistol matches. He captained Elliott Trophy team during that competition and his team later WON the Wirgman Trophy in 1938. Hudson received promotion to the rank of captain in January 1938.

During June 1938, Hudson attended Gunnery School aboard the cruiser USS Minneapolis, and, after the finishing of the course in August of that year, he was appointed commanding officer of the Marine detachment aboard the cruiser USS Quincy. He then took part in battle practice off Hawaii with the Pacific Fleet in Fleet Problem XIX.

== World War II ==
Hudson was ordered to the staff of Marine Corps School, Quantico in September 1940 and appointed an instructor within first Officer Candidates Class. In May 1941, he was appointed Plans and Training for all Officer Candidate classes. Within this command, he was promoted to the rank of major in January 1942 and to the temporary rank of lieutenant colonel in August of that year.

During the summer of 1942, Department of the Navy with the cooperation of Headquarters Marine Corps presented the concept of future Marine division and ordered the activation of 3rd Marine Division in September 1942. Hudson was transferred to Camp Lejeune, North Carolina one month later and assumed command of 2nd Battalion, 23rd Marine Regiment under Colonel Louis R. Jones. Hudson supervised the initial training of his battalion and with the plans for activation of 4th Marine Division, cadre of his battalion was detached from the 23rd Marine Regiment and used for the build-up of 25th Marine Regiment under Colonel Samuel C. Cumming.

=== Roi Namur ===
Hudson assumed command of 2nd Battalion, 25th Marines and coordinated the further unit's training in North Carolina. The 25th Marines were transferred to the West Coast in August 1943 and Hudson and his battalion sailed for San Diego via Panama Canal. They arrived on September 10 and marched to the newest marine base, Camp Pendleton and joined 4th Marine Division. All division's units began preparing for the first combat deployment in Pacific – Kwajalein Operation.

The 25th Marines took part in the landing exercise on San Clemente Island at the beginning of January 1944 subsequently left San Diego on January 13. They reached Hawaii on January 22 and then sailed to Kwajalein Atoll in the Marshall Islands. The main goal was to secure the Atoll and get that a new base for future offensives. The 25th Marine Regiment was designated a part of the Northern Landing Force, which took part in the capturing of Roi-Namur, the center of air activity in the Marshall Islands.

The main objective for 25th Marines was the capturing of the small off-shore islands, which should serve as artillery sites for fire support of advancing units. Hudson and his battalion were tasked the capturing of Ennubir Island, site of the main Japanese radio transmitter. Hudson landed with the battalion at the dawn of January 31 and captured the Island almost without resistance. He later secured all eight islands, but all without resistance. The Kwajalein operation ended with success on February 3, 1944, and 25th Marines sailed for Maui, Hawaii for rest and refit at the end of February of that year.

=== Saipan and Tinian ===
Hudson and his battalion then took part in the landing maneuvers and preparations for the next campaign, Saipan. They finally sailed back to the war zone on May 25 and after brief stay on Eniwetok, 25th Marines reached Saipan on June 15. The main objective of 4th Marine Division was the capture of Aslito airfield in the southern end of the island and advance north along the east coast.

Lieutenant Colonel Hudson landed with 2nd Battalion on left flank of Yellow Beach 1 in the morning of that day and half of the battalion successfully advanced inland almost 500 yards while taking cover behind the moving LVTs. The second half of his battalion was pinned down on the beach by enemy mortar and machine gun fire, until allied fighter planes wiped these enemy emplacements out. The Second Battalion led the way of the regiment and took part in the attack on Aslito Airfield on June 17.

After mopping-up operations in the southern part of the Island, Hudson and his battalion were attached to 2nd Battalion, 25th Marines went to the reserve on June 26 and remained there until the beginning of July. Hudson and his battalion were subsequently ordered to Mt. Petosukara, where repelled a furious assault of Japanese rifle company. The repeated attack on the morning of the next day was so intense that even personnel from the battalion aid station took part in the defense. An island was finally declared secured on July 9, 1944.

For general success in Marianas, an island of Tinian had to be secured, which was located southward of Saipan. Tinian was a little bit smaller than previous island, but higher quality garrison. The landing itself was commenced on July 24 and Hudson and 2nd Battalion landed on White Beach 1 in the North of the island during the morning of that day. Hudson subsequently led his battalion in attack on enemy positions on Mt. Maga and then attacked enemy fortifications on near Mt. Lasso on July 26.

On July 28, Japanese resistance on the island fell apart except some individuals, who denied to surrender. Hudson and his battalion took up in the mopping-up operations and Tinian was declared secured on August 1, 1944. For his service during the capturing of Saipan and Tinian, Hudson was decorated with the Legion of Merit with Combat "V".

=== Iwo Jima ===
The 25th Marines were ordered back to Maui, Hawaii, on August 5 and spent the next five months with training and preparations for future combat deployment. Hudson took part in the landing exercise in Ma‘alaea Bay on January 18, 1945, and then sailed with his unit for new mission – Iwo Jima.

Hudson landed with his 2nd battalion on Blue beach 2 on February 19 with the orders to seize high ground located 500 yards inland. The advance of the battalion was halted by the enemy's machine gun and mortar fire, and casualties began increasing. Hudson continuously exposed himself in the forward areas of the beachhead to encourage and direct his subordinates in the attack. By his personal example of fearlessness, he inspired his men to move forward in the attack despite heavy mortar, artillery, machine-gun and rifle fire, and to seize its sector of the initial beachhead, which consisted of the high ground adjacent to an airfield and a considerable area of a heavily fortified cliff line.

On February 20, when his battalion was subsequently pinned down again, Lieutenant Colonel Hudson repeatedly exposed himself to enemy fire in order to supervise and coordinate the attack. Although suffering painful wounds, he refused medical aid until all other casualties had been given treatment, continuing to supervise the attack until replaced by a new battalion commander, Lt.Col. James Taul.

His wounds were so serious that Hudson was evacuated to the United States for treatment. For his bravery in action, Hudson was decorated with the Navy Cross, the United States military's second-highest decoration awarded for valor in combat. He also received the Purple Heart for his wounds received on Iwo Jima.

== Postwar career ==
Hudson returned to the States in June 1945 and attached to the Troop Training Unit, Training Command, Amphibious Forces Pacific Fleet at Coronado, California. He served under Brigadier General Harry K. Pickett as Chief of Planning section and later as Assistant Team Chief, School Team. Hudson took part in the amphibious training for Pacific Fleet units until his departure in August 1947, when he was ordered for study to Army General and Staff College at Fort Leavenworth, Kansas. He graduated in June 1948 and received promotion to the rank of colonel at the same time.

His next assignment was Assistant Plans Officer on the staff of the commander, U.S. Naval Forces, Western Pacific under Vice Admiral Oscar C. Badger. Within this command, he participated in the actions in China during the Chinese Civil War until June 1949.

Hudson was then transferred to the Middle East and appointed military observer within the U.N. Palestine Mission in Jerusalem. While in this capacity, he was appointed president of the Mixed Armistice Commission of the United Nations and took part in the monitoring of ceasefire following the Syrian-Israeli and later Jordan-Israeli conflicts.

He returned stateside in March 1950 and served on the Marine Corps Military Equipment Policy Panel at Marine Corps Schools, Quantico until August of that year. Hudson was ordered to the instruction at National War College in Washington, D.C., and also completed Special Weapons Project Orientation Course at Sandia Base, New Mexico. Upon the graduation from the War college in June 1951, he was appointed assistant to the representative of the Joint Chiefs of Staff on the Senior Staff, National Security Council.

After two years in Washington, Hudson was transferred back to Quantico in July 1953 and appointed president of the Marine Corps Tactics and Techniques Board. He was appointed director of the Marine Corps Development Center later and remained at Quantico until the end of June 1956.

A highlight of his career came on July 1, 1956, when he was promoted to the rank of brigadier general and appointed commanding general of Landing Force Training Unit, Amphibious Training Command, Atlantic Fleet at Little Creek, Virginia. For next two years, Hudson was responsible for the amphibious Training of units within U.S. Atlantic Fleet and other units on the East Coast.

In June 1958, Hudson was ordered to Okinawa, Japan and assumed temporary command of 3rd Marine Division. He was originally ordered to Okinawa for the duties as assistant division commander, but divisional commander was ordered to the States a few weeks earlier and the chief of staff, Colonel Rathvon M. Tompkins, assumed temporary command of the division. Hudson served with the 3rd Division as the defense force of Far Eastern Area until August 1959, when he was ordered stateside. Following a brief leave with family, he was ordered to Washington, D.C., and appointed assistant chief of staff for operations and training at Headquarters Marine Corps under Commandant Randolph M. Pate.

His final assignment came in October 1960, when he was appointed deputy assistant chief of staff for G-3 Operations at Headquarters Marine Corps and served in this capacity until his retirement. Hudson retired from the Marine Corps on June 30, 1961, after 30 years of active service.

Hudson died on July 24, 2001, and is buried at West Tennessee State Veterans Cemetery in Memphis together with his wife, Anna Marie Marking (1912–1997). They had together five children: Lewis, Robert, John, Anne and Michael.

== Decorations ==
Here is the ribbon bar of Brigadier General Lewis C. Hudson:

1st Row	Navy Cross		Legion of Merit with Combat "V"
2nd Row	Purple Heart	Navy Presidential Unit Citation with two stars	American Defense Service Medal with Fleet Clasp
3rd Row	American Campaign Medal	Asiatic-Pacific Campaign Medal with three 3/16 inch service stars	World War II Victory Medal
4th Row	Navy Occupation Service Medal	China Service Medal	National Defense Service Medal with one service star

Military offices
Preceded by Rathvon M. Tompkins	Commanding General of 3rd Marine Division; May 9, 1959 - June 19, 1959	Succeeded by Robert B. Luckey

== See also ==
- 25th Marine Regiment
- Joint Expeditionary Base–Little Creek
- Naval Amphibious Base Coronado
