= Operation Pipestone Canyon =

Part of the Vietnam War (1969)

- Part of the Vietnam War
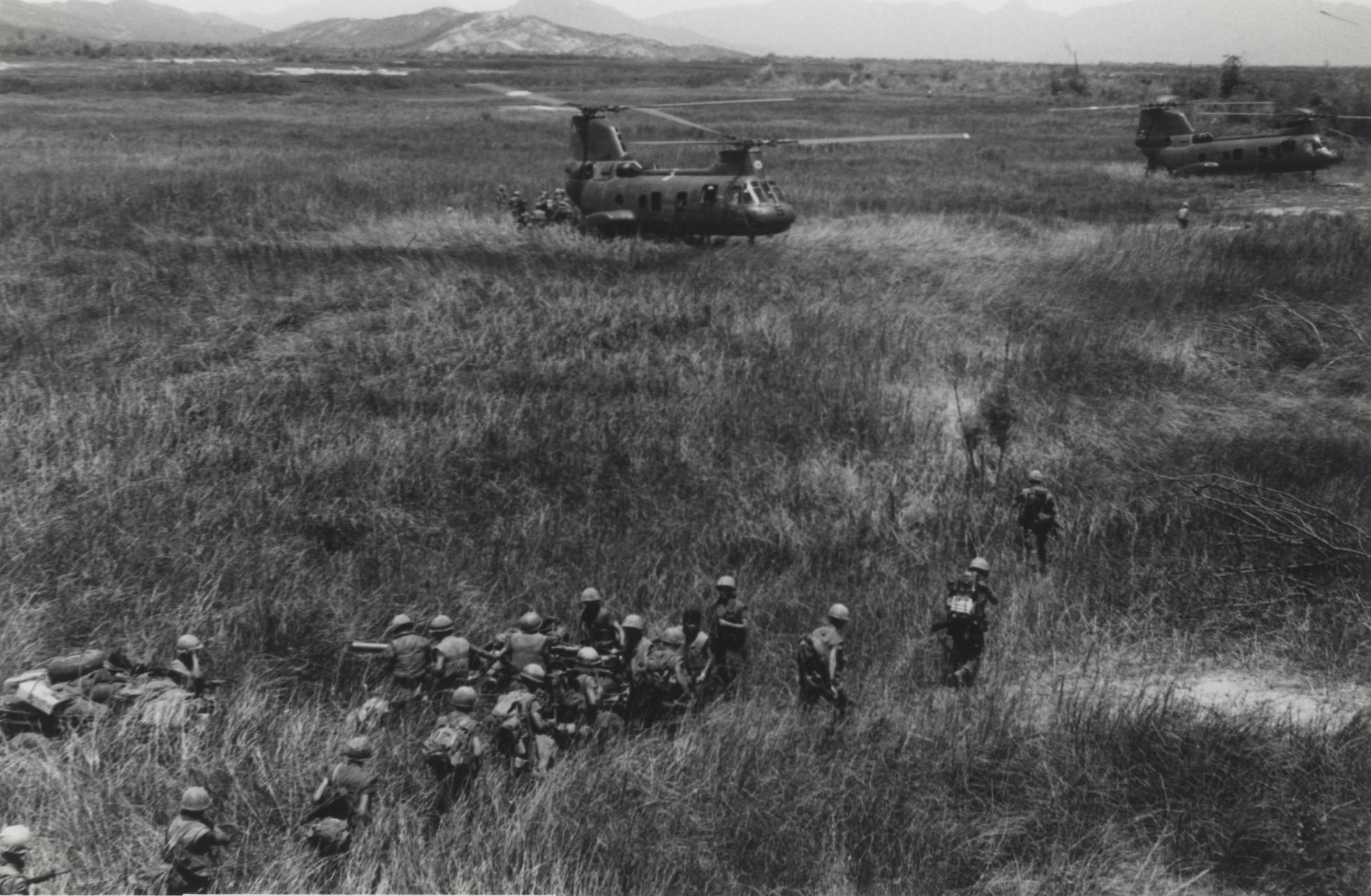
- HMM-263 CH-46s deploy Marines in Dodge City
Date	26 May – 7 November 1969
Location	Go Noi Island, Quảng Nam Province, South Vietnam, now Da Nang, Vietnam 15.85°N 108.2°E
Result	Allied operational success PAVN/VC forces driven from Go Noi Island and "Dodge City"

Belligerents
United States; South Vietnam; South Korea	Viet Cong; North Vietnam

Commanders and leaders
(United States) MG Ormond R. Simpson; Col. Charles S. Robertson; Col. Herbert L. Wilkerson	Vương Thừa Vũ

Units involved
(United States) 1st Battalion, 1st Marines; 2nd Battalion, 1st Marines; 3rd Battalion, 5th Marines; 1st Battalion, 26th Marines (South Vietnam) 1st Battalion, 51st Regiment; 2nd Battalion, 51st Regiment; 37th Ranger Battalion (South Korea) 2nd Marine Brigade	36th Regiment

Casualties and losses
(United States) 71 killed	852 killed 58 captured

Operation Pipestone Canyon was a US Marine Corps, Army of the Republic of Vietnam (ARVN) and Republic of Korea Marine Corps (ROKMC) operation that took place on Go Noi Island, Quảng Nam Province, lasting from 26 May to 7 November 1969.

== Background ==
Go Noi Island was located approximately 25 km south of Danang to the west of Highway 1, together with the area directly north of the island, nicknamed Dodge City by the Marines due to frequent ambushes and firefights there, it was a Vietcong (VC) and People's Army of Vietnam (PAVN) stronghold and base area. While the island was relatively flat, the small hamlets on the island were linked by hedges and concealed paths providing a strong defensive network. Go Noi was the base for the VC's Group 44 headquarters for Quảng Nam Province, the R-20 and V-25 Battalions and the T-3 Sapper Battalion and, it was believed, elements of the PAVN 2nd Division. The Marines had conducted Operation Jasper Square on the island during April 1968 with minimal results and then Operation Allen Brook from May to August 1968 severely disrupting the VC/PAVN infrastructure. In late November the Marines had launched Operation Meade River against the Dodge City area inflicting serious losses on the VC/PAVN.

Despite the earlier operations the VC/PAVN returned to the area and by mid-1969 it was believed to be the base area for the PAVN 36th Regiment comprising the R-20, D-3 Sapper, T-3 Sapper and T-89th Sapper Battalions and elements of the disbanded 38th Regiment.

In mid-May 1st Marine Division commander MG Ormond R. Simpson briefed the 1st Marine Regiment commander Col. Charles S. Robertson on the operational plan to completely clear and neutralize Go Noi Island and Dodge City and reopen Route 4 from Đại Lộc District to Điện Bàn District. A combined force of ten Marine, ROKMC and ARVN infantry battalions supported by engineers would take part in the operation which was scheduled to commence on or about 27 May.

== Operation ==
The operation began on 26 May with Special Landing Force Alpha 1st Battalion, 26th Marines advancing east from Hill 37 towards Dodge City and 3rd Battalion, 5th Marines advancing east from Liberty Bridge (15.841°N 108.121°E) towards Go Noi Island initially meeting little resistance but encountering more PAVN/VC fire and booby-traps as they penetrated further into the base areas. By 30 May the two battalions had secured their blocking positions west of the railway berm (15.851°N 108.1938°E) having killed 16 PAVN/VC for the loss of ten Marines killed.

On 31 May the second phase began with the ARVN 37th Ranger Battalion to the west, the 1st Battalion, 1st Marines and 2nd Battalion, 1st Marines in the middle and the ARVN 1st Battalion, 51st Regiment and 2nd Battalion, 51st Regiment to the east, crossing the Song La Tho river to attack south through Dodge City while the ROKMC 2nd Marine Brigade occupied blocking positions to the east. The five battalions located numerous recently abandoned bunkers and fighting positions which were protected by mines and booby-traps which were methodically cleared, but at least initially their advance was unopposed. Due to the extreme temperatures (up to 115 °F (46 °C)) and the need to methodically search the area, progress was relatively slow. On 2 June Company G was engaged by PAVN in a bunker complex and with tank support they overran this position killing seven PAVN and capturing one. Later that day a PAVN unit attempted to escape to the west, but was unable to penetrate the 1/26 Marines and Ranger blocking positions and instead retreated south towards Go Noi Island. By 5 June the five Battalions had reached the Song Ky Lam river which separated Dodge City from Go Noi Island.

With Dodge City now secured, Company A, 1st Engineer Battalion began repairs on Route 4. Meanwhile, an intensive bombardment of Go Noi Island began with 750,000 lbs of bombs dropped on the area. Special Landing Force Alpha was withdrawn from the operation and 1/1 Marines were moved by helicopter to the Liberty Bridge area.

On 10 June the third phase began with an intensive artillery and air bombardment of eastern Go Noi Island following which the 1/1 Marine advanced east from the railroad berm and 22 CH-46s deployed the 2/1 Marines and the ROKMC 1st Battalion into landing zones on the southeast of Go Noi Island and they began to sweep north. On 11 June the ROKMC 1st Battalion located a large bunker complex filled with supplies and PAVN dead, similar discoveries were made by 1/1 Marines and 2/1 Marines as they continued their sweeps. PAVN resistance was light as they broke into small groups and attempted to escape to the south.

On 13 June the Provisional Land-Clearing Company, comprising ten Marine Eimco M64 tractors and 7 Army D7E bulldozers and with security provided by Company M 3/5 Marines began moving east across Go Noi Island, however its progress was delayed when two tractors were disabled by land mines. Once it began moving again the company methodically removed all vegetation, destroying 97 tunnels, over 2000 bunkers and fighting positions and 3.2 km of trenches and flattening 8000 acres of land. On 15 June 3/5 Marines left the operation and 1/1 Marine took over security responsibility for the land clearing operation, while the ARVN 1st and 2nd Battalions moved east of Dodge City to sweep the area around Route 1.

On 19 June Companies B and C 1/1 Marines began a sweep of western Go Noi Island, but their advance was soon delayed by numerous mines and booby-traps. On 21 June 1/1 Marines left the operation and the sweep was taken over by the 2/1 Marines who suffered a steady toll of dead and wounded from mines and booby-traps. On 27 June 1/1 Marines conducted a sweep of northern Dodge City finding some PAVN/VC killed in the earlier operation but meeting minimal opposition. At the end of June Route 4 was reopened to traffic. Simpson decided that eastern Go Noi Island should be permanently occupied and construction began on two firebases, one for the ARVN 3rd Battalion, 51st Regiment and one for the ROKMC 1st Battalion.

In early July US intelligence indicated that a PAVN/VC unit had returned to Dodge City and a battalion sized cordon of the village of Tay Bang An (15.895°N 108.210°E) was planned. On 14 July as CH-46s inserted the 2/1 Marines into four landing zones around Tay Bang An they came under fire damaging seven helicopters. The Marines gradually tightened the cordon around Tay Bang An, engaging in small skirmishes with PAVN/VC, eventually killing 20 and capturing 14 by the end of the operation on 17 July. On 20 July the land-clearing operations on western Go Noi Island were completed. PAVN/VC losses to this point were 734 killed and 55 captured while Marine losses were 57 killed. In response to renewed PAVN/VC activity in the Dodge City area a fourth phase began on 21 July with 1/1 Marines searching the southwest of Dodge City triggering numerous mines and boob-traps but encountering no PAVN/VC in the 3 day sweep. On 25 July a patrol by Company L mounted on LVT-5s in western Go Noi Island hit a land mine killing three Marines.

Throughout August and September the Marines, ARVN and ROKMC continued their sweeps of Go Noi Island and Dodge City encountering few PAVN/VC. On 11 October the final phase of the operation began with 1/1 Marines again sweeping Dodge City encountering only scattered pockets of PAVN/VC.

== Aftermath ==
Operation Pipestone Canyon concluded on 7 November, the Marines had lost 71 killed and the PAVN/VC 852 killed and 58 captured. The operation was regarded as a success as the PAVN/VC had been driven from Dodge City and Go Noi Island (which had been completely transformed during the operation) and Route 4 had been successfully reopened.
