= Joseph O. Butcher =

U.S. Marine Corps Major General

Joseph Orville Butcher
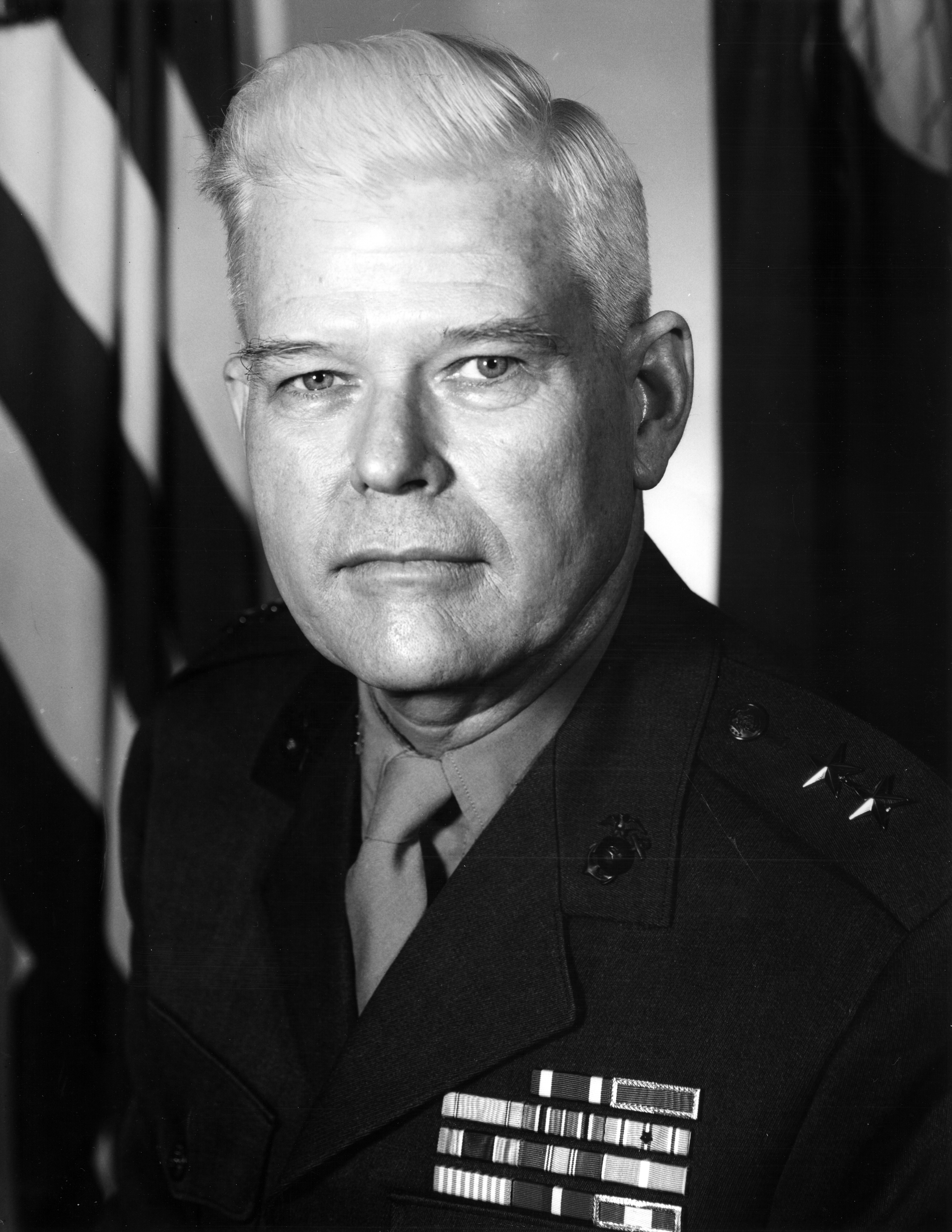
- MG Joseph O. Butcher, USMC
- Born: September 16, 1912; Bloomington, Indiana, US
- Died: February 15, 1988 (aged 75); Indianapolis, Indiana, US
- Burial place: Rose Hill Cemetery, Indiana
- Military career
- Allegiance: United States
- Branch: United States Marine Corps
- Service years: 1935–1968
- Rank: Major general
- Service number: 0-5320
- Commands: Camp Lejeune; Marine Supply Center Albany; Marine Corps Institute
- Conflicts: World War II: Battle of Iwo Jima; Battle of Okinawa; Korean War
- Awards: Legion of Merit; Joint Service Commendation Medal; Navy Commendation Medal

Joseph Orville Butcher (September 16, 1912 – February 15, 1988) was decorated officer of the United States Marine Corps who reached the rank of major general. He spent his career mostly in Quartermaster Department of the Marine Corps beginning in the field assignments during World War II. Butcher later served as commanding general, Marine Corps Supply Center Albany and also Assistant Quartermaster General of the Marine Corps and deputy to Major General Chester R. Allen.

== Early years ==
Joseph O. Butcher was born on September 16, 1912, in Bloomington, Indiana, as the son of Orville and Ella Butcher. Upon the graduation from the high school, he enrolled the Indiana University in Bloomington and graduated with Bachelor of Arts degree in June 1936. While at the university, Butcher completed the advanced training with the Army Reserve Officers' Training Corps unit and was commissioned Reserve Second lieutenant in June 1935.

However Butcher resigned his reserve commission in order to accept appointment as second lieutenant in the Marine Corps on July 7, 1936, and was subsequently ordered to the Basic School at Philadelphia Navy Yard for further officer training. He completed the school in April 1937 and was attached to the Marine detachment aboard the battleship USS Arkansas which participated in the midshipmen training cruises in the Western Atlantic.

His tour of sea duty ended in September 1938 and Butcher was transferred to Washington, D.C., for duties with local Marine Barracks. During his time there, he also served as editor and publisher for Leatherneck Magazine. Butcher spent almost three years there and served also as Post Exchange officer and commanding officer of the Marine Corps Institute. He was promoted to the rank of first lieutenant in July 1939 and took part in the temporary duty with the Marine Guard Detachment at Little White House in Warm Springs, Georgia – the personal retreat of President Franklin D. Roosevelt.

== World War II ==
In June 1941, Butcher was transferred to the Marine Corps Air Station, Quantico for duty as station quartermaster. While in this capacity, he was promoted to the rank of captain in June 1942 and to major in August of that year.

Butcher was transferred to Camp Lejeune, North Carolina in October 1942 and appointed adjutant and executive officer of Quartermaster School, Fleet Marine Force Training Center. He received promotion to lieutenant colonel in March 1944 and subsequently was ordered overseas in October of that year.

He was ordered to Pearl Harbor, Hawaii and appointed officer in charge of General Supply Section, Supply Division of Service Command, Fleet Marine Force, Pacific under Major General Earl C. Long. In this capacity, he was co-responsible for the supply, salvage, evacuation, construction, personnel management, quartering and sanitation needs of all FMFPac units and others marine units in its area.

While in this capacity, Butcher took part in the Iwo Jima and Okinawa operations and received Navy Commendation Medal for his service. He was transferred to the staff of United States Army Forces, Western Pacific under General Douglas MacArthur and assumed duty as Marine logistics officer of the Provisional Marine detachment. His unit participated in the preparation for the Invasion to Japan, but it was cancelled following the surrender of Japan in August 1945.

== Later service ==
Butcher then returned to Pearl Harbor for service with Service Command and served as assistant operations officer until February 1946. He subsequently assumed duty as editor-in-chief of Leatherneck Magazine in Washington, D.C., and remained in this capacity until August of that year.

He was then appointed executive officer, Division of Public Information at Headquarters Marine Corps and served under Brigadier General William E. Riley until August 1947, when he was ordered for the instruction at Industrial College of the Armed Forces. Butcher graduated in June 1948 and served as supply officer and assistant head, Material Section, Division of Aviation at Headquarters Marine Corps.

In July 1951, Butcher was transferred to California and assumed duty as depot supply officer, Marine Corps Recruit Depot San Diego under Major General William T. Clement. For his new assignment, he was promoted to the rank of colonel in November of that year.

However, due to his previous experiences with supplying of Marine Aviation units, Butcher was transferred to Korea in May 1954 and served as wing supply officer, 1st Marine Aircraft Wing under Major General Verne J. McCaul. The truce was already in effect and Butcher saw no combat while in Far East. He returned to the United States in May 1955 and following a brief leave at home, he assumed duty as director, Material Division within Marine Corps Supply Center, Barstow, California.

In August 1957, Butcher served as chief of staff of the center under Brigadier General Ralph B. DeWitt until he was ordered to Camp Lejeune in September 1958 as commanding officer, Marine Corps Supply Schools. After two years there, Butcher was transferred to the Pentagon and served in the Office of Supply Management Policy, Office of the Assistant Secretary of Defense (Supply and Logistics).

Upon his promotion to the rank of brigadier general in July 1961, he was appointed assistant to Quartermaster General of the Marine Corps, Chester R. Allen. In this capacity, Butcher was co-responsible for the support of development, production, acquisition, and sustainment of general supply, Mortuary Affairs, subsistences, petroleum and water, material and distribution management during peace and war to provide combat power to the U.S. Marine Corps units. He left Washington in September 1962 and assumed command of Marine Corps Supply Center Albany, Georgia.

In January 1964, Butcher assumed command of Marine Corps Supply Activity in Philadelphia and served in this capacity until his promotion to the rank of major general on February 28, 1966. He was then ordered back to Korea and participated in the peace negotiations with Chinese and North Koreans at Panmunjom as senior member, Military Armistice Commission. For his service during the supervision of Korean Armistice Agreement and other duties, Butcher was decorated with Joint Service Commendation Medal.

Butcher returned to the United States in November 1966 and assumed his final duties as commanding general, Camp Lejeune, North Carolina. He commanded the base during the early phase of Vietnam War and was responsible for the training of new marine recruits and other units, which was later deployed in Vietnam. Butcher served in this capacity until September 30, 1968, when he was relieved by Major General Rathvon M. Tompkins and subsequently retired from active service. He was decorated with the Legion of Merit for his service at Camp Lejeune.

== Retirement ==
Following his retirement from the Marine Corps after 33 years of commissioned service, Butcher settled in Indiana and worked in executive position within Indiana University Foundation. He served as director of Indiana University Sesquicentennial Campaign and received the university's Distinguished Alumni Service Award. Butcher later served as special projects coordinator and president of alumni association and remained in this capacities until his death on February 15, 1988, in Indianapolis.

He was buried at Rose Hill Cemetery in Bloomington, Indiana, together with his wife, former Jane Bayer of Indianapolis. They had one son, John O. Butcher who served in the Marine Corps as Reserve Officer. In 1992, Joseph O. Butcher was inducted to the Monroe County Hall of fame.

== Decorations ==
Here is the ribbon bar of Major General Joseph O. Butcher:

1st Row	Legion of Merit		
2nd Row	Joint Service Commendation Medal	Navy Commendation Medal	Army Presidential Unit Citation
3rd Row	American Defense Service Medal	American Campaign Medal	Asiatic-Pacific Campaign Medal with one 3/16 inch service star
4th Row	World War II Victory Medal	National Defense Service Medal with one star	Korean Service Medal
5th Row	United Nations Korea Medal	Philippine Liberation Medal	Philippine Republic Presidential Unit Citation

Military offices
Preceded by Ormond R. Simpson	Commanding General of the Camp Lejeune; December 12, 1966 - September 30, 1968	Succeeded by Rathvon M. Tompkins
Preceded by William P. Battell	Commanding General of the Marine Corps Supply Center Albany; September 1, 1962 - December 31, 1963	Succeeded by Paul R. Tyler
