= Ormond R. Simpson =

United States Marine Corps general (1915–1998)

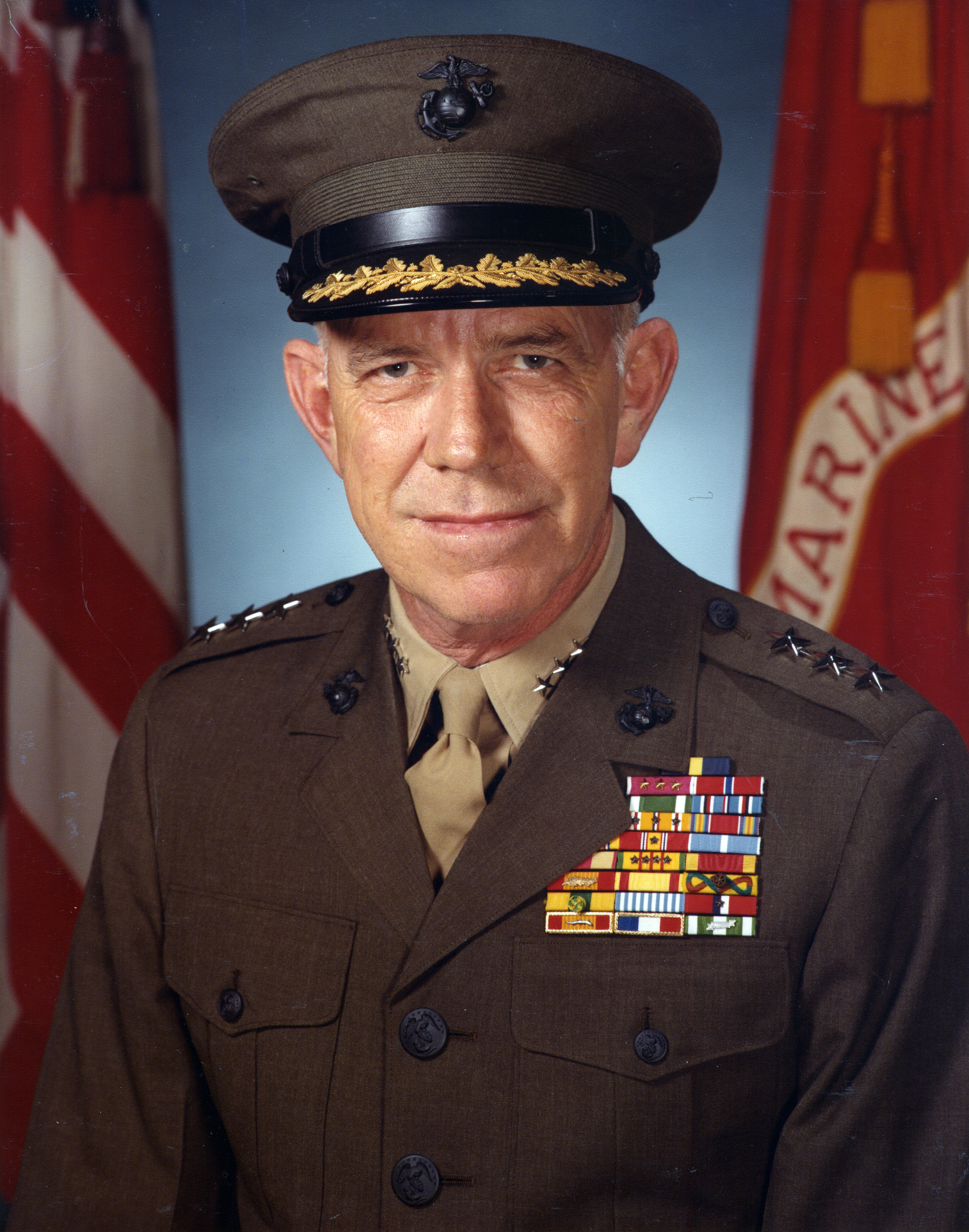
- LTG Ormond R. Simpson, USMC
- Born: 16 March 1915; Corpus Christi, Texas, US
- Died: 21 November 1998 (aged 83); College Station, Texas, US
- Burial place: College Station Cemetery
- Military career
- Allegiance: United States
- Branch: United States Marine Corps
- Service years: 1936–1973
- Rank: Lieutenant general
- Service number: 0-5422
- Commands: Director of Personnel; Marine Supply Center, Albany; 1st Marine Division; MCRD Parris Island; 2nd Marine Division; 3rd Marine Expeditionary Brigade; Secretary to the Commandant; 1st Marine Regiment; 6th Marine Regiment
- Conflicts: World War II; Operation Cartwheel; Landing on Emirau; Philippines Campaign; Battle of Leyte; Battle of Manila; Occupation of Japan; Korean War; Dominican Civil War; Vietnam War; Laotian Civil War; Operation Oklahoma Hills; Operation Pipestone Canyon
- Awards: Distinguished Service Medal (2); Legion of Merit (4); Bronze Star Medal; Navy Commendation Medal

Ormond Ralph Simpson (16 March 1915 – 21 November 1998) was a highly decorated officer of the United States Marine Corps with the rank of lieutenant general, who held a number of important assignments throughout his career. He is most noted as commanding general of 1st Marine Division during Vietnam War and later as director of personnel and deputy chief of staff for manpower at Headquarters Marine Corps.

== Early career and World War II ==
Ormond R. Simpson was born on 16 March 1915, in Corpus Christi, Texas, and graduated from high school there in 1931. He then attended Texas A&M University in College Station, Texas, and graduated with Bachelor of Science degree in mechanical engineering in June 1936. While at University, he was a member of ROTC unit and received army reserve commission at the end of May 1936. However he resigned his reserve commission in order to accept appointment as second lieutenant on 1 July of that year.

He was ordered to the Basic School at Philadelphia Navy Yard for further officer training and completed the school one year later. Simpson then served as platoon leader with 1st Marine Brigade in Guantánamo, Cuba, before he was ordered to San Diego and attached to the newly activated 8th Marine Regiment in April 1940. He was promoted to the rank of first lieutenant in November 1940 and appointed company commander.

Following the promotion to the rank of captain in December 1941, Simpson was appointed regimental adjutant and sailed with 8th Marines to the Pacific area in mid June 1942. He was then stationed at American Samoa as a part of the Samoan Group Defense Force under Major General Charles F. B. Price. Simpson was appointed regimental assistant operations officer in August 1942 and promoted to the rank of major for his new billet.

In March 1944, Simpson was attached to the Landing force within 3rd Marine Division and took part in Landing on Emirau, which met no resistance. He was promoted to the rank of lieutenant colonel in April 1944 and ordered back to the States one month later. Upon his return stateside, Simpson was ordered to the Infantry course at Command and Staff College at Fort Leavenworth, Kansas and graduated in November of that year.

Simpson was subsequently ordered back to the Pacific area and attached to the headquarters of South West Pacific Area under General Douglas MacArthur. He served as assistant logistics officer during Philippines Campaign and took part in the Battles of Leyte and Manila. Simpson remained in that capacity until January 1946 and also participated in the Occupation of Japan. For his service on MacArthur's staff, Simpson was decorated with the Legion of Merit.

== Postwar career ==
Upon his return from Japan in March 1946, Simpson was attached to the staff of Marine Corps Schools, Quantico under Brigadier General Oliver P. Smith and served for next three years as an instructor within Logistics section. He was detached from Quantico in June 1949 and ordered to the Headquarters Marine Corps in Washington, D.C., as special assistant to the director of plans and policies under Brigadier General Edwin A. Pollock. While in this capacity, Simpson was promoted to the rank of colonel in November 1951.

General Pollock subsequently assumed command of 2nd Marine Division at Camp Lejeune and Simpson followed him in January 1952 as commanding officer of the 6th Marine Regiment. Second Marine Division did not deployed overseas during Korean War and Simpson supervised regiment's Combat readiness until April 1953, when he was appointed Divisional logistics officer by new division commander, General Randolph M. Pate.

Simpson proved to be outstanding officer and when General Pate was ordered to South Korea in June 1953, he requested Simpson as new commanding officer of 1st Marine Regiment. While the Armistice was already in effect, Simpson and 1st Marines were tasked with the guarding of Demilitarized Zone and repatriation of prisoners-of-war.

In February 1954, he was relieved by Colonel William K. Jones and transferred to the 1st Marine Division staff as assistant chief of staff and operations officer. Simpson left Korea in July 1954 and received the Bronze Star Medal for his service in that country.

Following his return to the States, Simpson attended Army War College at Carlisle, Pennsylvania, and graduated in June 1955. He was then ordered to the Headquarters Marine Corps and attached to the Policy Analysis Division, before he was appointed secretary to the General Staff in October of that year.

At the beginning of January 1956, Simpson's old superior, General Pate was appointed Commandant of the Marine Corps and Simpson was appointed his Military Secretary. In this capacity, he served as the senior advisor and task manager and ran the day-to-day operations of the Office of the Commandant, supervised the schedule of the commandant, and performed other duties as the commandant may direct.

Simpson was succeeded by Colonel Roy L. Kline in July 1958 and then was ordered to the staff of Marine Corps Schools, Quantico under Brigadier General Merrill B. Twining. He spent next two years in this assignment, before he was appointed commanding officer of the Naval Reserve Officers Training Corps unit and Professor of Naval Science at Duke University in Durham, North Carolina, in July 1960.

Upon the promotion to the rank of brigadier general on 1 July 1961; Simpson was transferred to Okinawa, Japan and appointed assistant commander of 3rd Marine Division under Major General Robert E. Cushman. In May 1962, the Government of Thailand requested military assistance from the United States during the ongoing Laotian Civil War, when Soviet Union aided the communist Pathet Lao Army in Laos and there was a threat of expansion to Thailand. Simpson was appointed commander of 3rd Marine Expeditionary Brigade (detached from the 3rd Marine Division) and landed with 3,000 Marines as a show of force in Thailand.

He resumed his duties with 3rd Marine Division on Okinawa at the beginning of August 1962 and left for the United States in November of that year. Simpson was subsequently appointed assistant director of personnel at Headquarters Marine Corps and served as deputy to Major General Lewis J. Fields until April 1965. He demonstrated great administrative skills while in this capacity and received Navy Commendation Medal.

Simpson assumed command of 2nd Marine Division at Camp Lejeune on 12 April 1965, and shortly thereafter was tasked with the handling of the situation in Dominican Republic during the Communist-attempted coup. He authorized the activation of 6th Marine Expeditionary Unit in size of 1,700 Marines and this unit was tasked with the securing of International Security Zone in Santo Domingo. Simpson was later decorated with his second Legion of Merit for his part during Dominican crisis and promoted to the rank of major general in January 1966.

During the period September – December 1966, he also concurrently served as commanding general of Marine Corps Base Camp Lejeune, before new base commander, Major General Joseph O. Butcher was designated. Simpson was succeeded in command of 2nd Division on 21 November 1967, and assumed command of Marine Corps Recruit Depot Parris Island one day later. In this capacity, he was responsible for the training of new recruits for units serving overseas, primarily in South Vietnam and received third Legion of Merit.

== Vietnam War ==
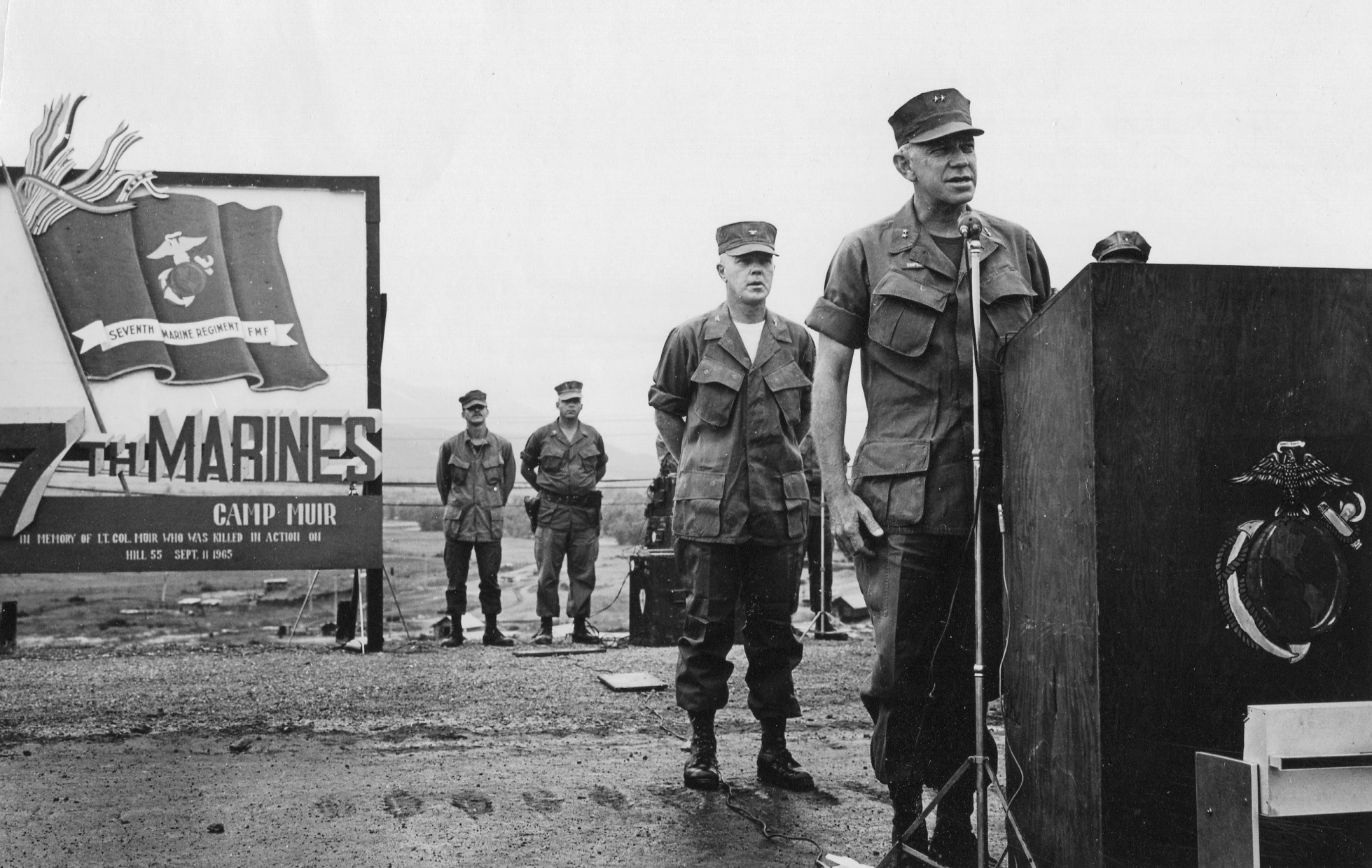
MG Ormond R. Simpson, CG 1st Marine Division during the ceremony at Camp Muir, COL Herbert L. Beckington (7th Marines) stands behind him in 1969.

Simpson received orders for deployment to Vietnam shortly before Christmas 1968 and arrived at Da Nang, where he relieved Major General Carl A. Youngdale on 21 December. The First Marine Division was tasked with the defense of Da Nang area at the time.

Simpson later commented:

"The 1st Marine Division was, far beyond all else, tied to the defense of the Da Nang Vital Area. This was exactly as it should have been. Da Nang was clearly a textbook example of a 'Vital Area'. Here were military headquarters, political headquarters and officials, a great seaport, a splendid airfield, a vast array of logistical support apparatus including supplies of every variety, equipment, medical establishments, to say nothing of nearly one million Vietnamese. U.S. Forces could not have operated in I Corps Tactical Zone without Da Nang." Therefore, the division's infantry units and supporting arms were to be "disposed to provide maximum security for the Da Nang vital area, installations and Lines of communications of greatest political, economic and military importance."

The large mountainous area west of Da Nang was suspected as a region of major enemy base camps and infiltration routes, which were threat to the Da Nang Vital Area. Simpson subsequently ordered the search and destroy Operation Oklahoma Hills, to eliminate People's Army of Vietnam (PAVN) and Viet Cong (VC) forces in the area. The operation took place in March 1969 and Simpson designated 7th Marines under Colonel Robert L. Nichols as main force for the entire operation. The combat lasted until the end of May 1969 and although the PAVN/VC avoided major confrontation, Marine units drove them from their base camps and inflicted a total of 589 casualties.

Simpson then commanded the 1st Marine Division during Operation Pipestone Canyon, which was planned for the destruction of Go Noi Island area, south of Da Nang. Go Noi Island was site of PAVN/VC base camps and infiltration routes, which was assaulted by Marine forces several times in 1968, but PAVN/VC forces always returned to the area following the U.S. withdrawal. General Simpson chose 3rd Battalion, 5th Marines and 1st Battalion, 26th Marines for the first phase of the assault and launched the operation on 26 May. They met only little resistance and subsequently secured blocking positions on 30 May.

On 31 May, Simpson launched the second phase of the operation and ordered the 1st Marine Regiment under Colonel Charles S. Robertson to attack Go Noi Island. During the subsequent months of fighting, they destroyed numerous bunkers and fighting positions which were protected by mines and booby-traps. The operations ended on 7 November with the PAVN/VC losing nearly 900 men.

General Simpson was succeeded by Edwin B. Wheeler on 14 December 1969, and returned to the United States at the end of the month. For his service in Vietnam, he was decorated with Navy Distinguished Service Medal and also received several decorations for merits by the Government of South Vietnam.

== Later service and retirement ==
Following his return stateside, Simpson was appointed commanding general of Marine Corps Supply Center, Albany, Georgia and held this command until summer of 1971. He received his fourth Legion of Merit for his service at Albany.

He was then ordered to the Headquarters Marine Corps in Washington, D.C., and appointed director of personnel under Commandant Robert E. Cushman. Following the redesignation of that assignment in 1972, Simpson was promoted to the rank of lieutenant general and appointed deputy chief of staff for manpower. He served in this capacity until his retirement on 1 May 1973, after 37 years of active service. Simpson also received his second Navy Distinguished Service Medal during his retirement ceremony.

Simpson then returned to Texas and settled in College Station, with his wife Marjorie E. Simpson with who they had two children. He then worked at his alma mater, Texas A&M University, as assistant vice president for student services and the head of the School of Military Sciences until his second retirement.

Lieutenant General Ormond R. Simpson died on 21 November 1998. He is honoured by the Texas A&M Corps of Cadets through the Simpson Drill Field, the O. R. Simpson Award for Most Outstanding Color Guard and the O.R. Simpson Honor Society.

== Decorations ==
Here is the ribbon bar of Lieutenant General Ormond R. Simpson:

1st Row	Navy Distinguished Service Medal with one 5/16" Gold Star		Legion of Merit with three 5/16" Gold Stars	Bronze Star Medal
2nd Row	Navy Commendation Medal	Marine Corps Expeditionary Medal	American Defense Service Medal	American Campaign Medal
3rd Row	Asiatic-Pacific Campaign Medal with three 3/16 inch service stars	World War II Victory Medal	Navy Occupation Service Medal	National Defense Service Medal with one star
4th Row	Korean Service Medal	Vietnam Service Medal with four 3/16 inch service stars	Vietnam National Order of Vietnam, Knight	Vietnam Army Distinguished Service Order, 1st Class
5th Row	Vietnam Gallantry Cross with Palm	Armed Forces Honor Medal 1st Class	Vietnam Choung My Medal, 1st class	Philippine Liberation Medal with one star
6th Row	Philippine Republic Presidential Unit Citation	Vietnam Gallantry Cross Unit Citation	United Nations Korea Medal	Vietnam Campaign Medal

== See also ==
- 1st Marine Division
- 2nd Marine Division
- Operation Pipestone Canyon

Military offices
Preceded by Carl A. Youngdale	Commanding General of the 1st Marine Division; 21 December 1968 – 14 December 1969	Succeeded by Edwin B. Wheeler
Preceded by Rathvon M. Tompkins	Commanding General of the Marine Corps Recruit Depot Parris Island; 22 November 1967 – 16 November 1968	Succeeded by Oscar F. Peatross
Preceded by Herman Nickerson Jr.	Commanding General of the Camp Lejeune; 9 September 1966 – 11 December 1966	Succeeded by Joseph O. Butcher
Preceded by William J. Van Ryzin	Commanding General of the 2nd Marine Division; 12 April 1965 – 21 November 1967	Succeeded by Edwin B. Wheeler
