= Rathvon M. Tompkins =

U.S. Marine Corps Major General

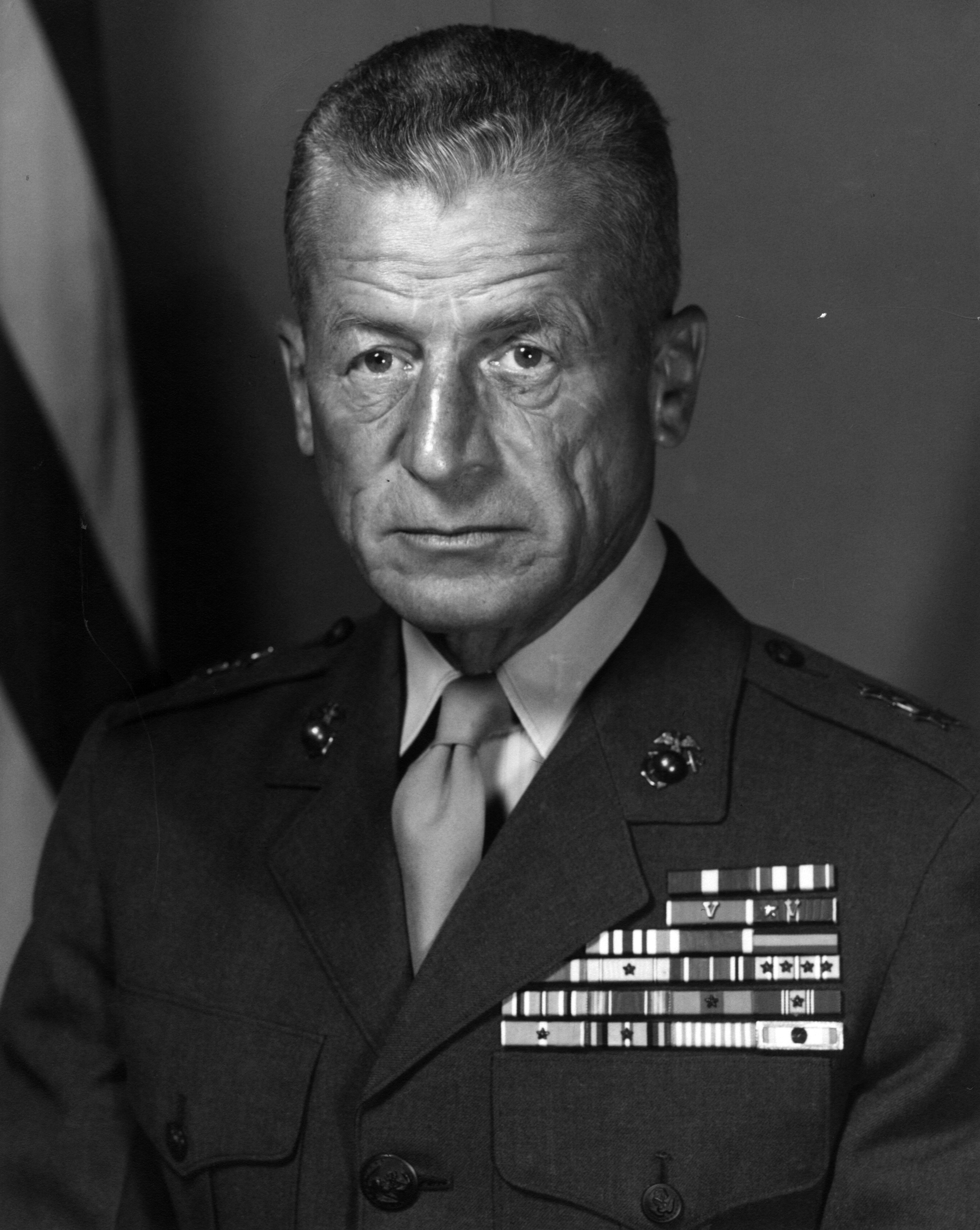
- Tompkins in 1966
- Born: August 23, 1912; Boulder, Colorado, U.S.
- Died: September 17, 1999 (aged 87); Lexington, South Carolina, U.S.
- Burial place: Arlington National Cemetery
- Relatives: Major General Clayton B. Vogel (father-in-law)
- Military career
- Allegiance: United States
- Branch: United States Marine Corps
- Service years: 1935–1971
- Rank: Major General
- Service number: 0-5269
- Commands: Camp Lejeune; 3rd Marine Division; MCRD Parris Island; 2nd Marine Division; 5th Marine Regiment; 1st Battalion, 29th Marines
- Conflicts: World War II; Occupation of Iceland; Battle of Guadalcanal; Battle of Gifu; Battle of Tarawa; Battle of Saipan; Korean War; Dominican Civil War; Vietnam War; Con Thien; Battle of Khe Sanh; Tet Offensive
- Awards: Navy Cross; Navy Distinguished Service Medal (2); Silver Star; Legion of Merit (2); Bronze Star Medal (2); Purple Heart

Rathvon McClure Tompkins (August 23, 1912 – September 17, 1999) was a highly decorated United States Marine Corps major general. He saw combat in World War II, the Korean War, the Vietnam War and led Marine units during the Dominican Civil War. Tompkins is well known for his part as commander of the 3rd Marine Division during the Battle of Khe Sanh in Vietnam.

During his 36 years of Marine Corps service, Tompkins was awarded the Navy Cross, the United States military's second highest decoration awarded for valor in combat, for his actions during the Battle of Saipan and the Silver Star for actions during the Battle of Tarawa.

== Early years ==
Rathvon M. Tompkins was born on August 23, 1912, in Boulder, Colorado,. He was the son of Anne Cochran Rathvon (1887–1924) and Howard Richard Kelsey Tompkins (1882–1945). His father served in the 89th Division during World War I, commanding a battery of field artillery and rising to the rank of major.

In the fall of 1925, Tompkins was sent to a private boarding school for boys in South Kent, Connecticut, where he lettered in football and hockey. He planned to attend Yale but subsequently enrolled at the University of Colorado. Tompkins graduated with a Bachelor of Arts degree in the summer of 1935 and subsequently enlisted in the Marine Corps Reserve on June 5 of that year. He was subsequently selected for the Reserve Platoon leaders' course at Marine Corps Base San Diego, California during July and August 1935 and commissioned a second lieutenant in the Marine Corps Reserve on March 25, 1936.

== World War II ==
Tompkins worked three years in a private sector, before he was recalled to active service in October 1939. He was attached to the Reserve Officers Class within the Marine Corps Schools Quantico, Virginia, and graduated during the following month of that year. Tompkins was subsequently sent to San Diego, California, and attached to the 2nd Battalion, 6th Marines, under Lieutenant Colonel John Thomason, as a platoon leader.

Tompkins was promoted to first lieutenant in February 1940 and later appointed 2nd Battalion Personnel officer (Bn-1). During May 1941, his regiment was attached to the 1st Provisional Marine Brigade under Brigadier General John Marston and sailed for Iceland to prevent Germans from occupying the island. Tompkins spent almost eight months with occupation duties in Reykjavík and returned to the United States in March 1942 as a captain.

Upon his return, the 6th Marines was attached to the 2nd Marine Division at San Diego and began preparations for combat deployment. Tompkins was promoted to major in August 1942 and appointed regimental operations officer. He sailed to the Pacific area one month later under the command of World War I hero Colonel Gilder D. Jackson. Tompkins and his unit arrived in Wellington, New Zealand, at the end of October 1942 and began training.

The Marine units from the 1st Marine Division had already fought on Guadalcanal and the 6th Marines, together with the forward echelon of the 2nd Marine Division under Brigadier General Alphonse DeCarre, were ordered to reinforce them on December 26, 1942. They arrived on Guadalcanal at the beginning of January 1943 and took part in the final attack inland and in the Battle of Gifu.

The 6th and 8th Marines encircled the remnants of two Japanese regiments from the 2nd Imperial Japanese Army Division and subsequently killed 642 Japanese troops, capturing only two. After the island was declared secured at the beginning of February 1943, the 6th Marines were ordered to the rear area near the beach for hot showers and some rest. For his service at Guadalcanal, he was decorated with the Bronze Star Medal with Combat "V".

The 6th Marines subsequently returned to New Zealand on February 19, 1943, for rest and refit. Besides wounded men from combat, many of Tompkins' men suffered from malaria. It took almost several months to transform them back into an effective combat force. While in New Zealand, Tompkins was transferred to the 2nd Marine Division staff and appointed assistant operations officer. He then took part in the preparing of the division for a new mission, Tarawa Atoll in the Gilbert Islands. The Japanese had built a large air base there, and the Allies needed to secure that island for the next advance toward the Marshall Islands.

On November 20, units of the 2nd Marine Division landed on Betio Island in South Tarawa under heavy enemy machine gun and mortar fire. Tompkins landed on Red beach on D-Day and was informed that:

elements of a Marine battalion were pinned under Betio Pier by continuous Japanese machine gun, sniper and intermittent cannon fire and that numerous casualties were helpless in the water, Major Tompkins unhesitatingly braved the savage bombardment to swim to a native skiff and returning under the blasting salvos of deadly fire rescued three wounded men from the treacherous waters under the pier and transported them to a Higgins boat, subsequently proceeding to a reef off the beach where he evacuated four additional casualties from a damaged landing craft. By his daring initiative resolute fortitude and persevering efforts in the face of overwhelming odds, Major Tompkins saved seven Marines from almost certain death.

Tompkins was decorated with the Silver Star for his acts of valor at Tarawa and also received promotion to the rank of lieutenant colonel in December 1943. The 2nd Marine Division suffered heavy casualties, with 1,009 dead and another 2,101 wounded and was ordered to Hawaii for rest and refit. Tompkins remained in the capacity of assistant operations officer under new division commander Thomas E. Watson, who joined the 2nd Division in April 1944.

The 2nd Division conducted intensive training in order to prepare for an upcoming operation in the Marianas Islands. The capture of the Marianas could provide a new air base that could be used for attacks on Japan.

The main assault on the island of Saipan began on June 15, 1944, and Tompkins landed on the same day. On June 17, Lieutenant Colonel Guy E. Tannyhill, commanding officer of the 1st Battalion, 29th Marines, which was attached to the 2nd Marine Division, was wounded by an enemy sniper and evacuated. Tompkins subsequently assumed command of the battalion on the same day and promptly reorganized the heavily depleted unit. His new battalion was located in a swamp area and pinned down by enemy snipers and gun emplacements. Tompkins made a hasty reconnaissance of the front lines and subsequently ordered his men and several tanks to the attack. During the attack, his troops captured vital objectives and overrun Japanese strongpoints according to plan.

During the fierce fighting on July 3, Tompkins was hit by the fragments of enemy shell and subsequently evacuated to the United States. For his heroism in combat on Saipan, Tompkins was decorated with the Navy Cross, the United States military's second highest decoration awarded for valor in combat. He also received the Purple Heart for his wounds.

Tompkins' wounds were so serious that he spent next five months in the Naval Hospital in San Diego, California. Tompkins was released from the hospital at the beginning of February 1945 and after the brief vacation at home, he was attached to the Division of Plans and Policies at Headquarters Marine Corps under Brigadier General Gerald C. Thomas.

== Postwar career ==
In January 1947, Tompkins was ordered to London, England, and assigned to instruction at Joint Services Staff College. Upon the graduation, Tompkins served as naval observer within the Office of the U.S. Naval Attaché in London and later as an instructor at School of Combined Operations. His tenure in Europe ended in April 1948, when he was ordered to the staff of Marine Corps Schools, Quantico as Chief of Infantry Section at Amphibious Warfare School. While at Quantico, Tompkins was appointed an instructor within the Tactical Operations Group, Combined Arms section, and received promotion to the rank of colonel in February 1951.

In August 1951, Tompkins was ordered to Washington, D.C., and attached to the War Plans section, Joint Strategic and Operations Group within Joint Chiefs of Staff under General Omar Bradley. Within this assignment was responsibility for the coordination of communication and interaction between the various United States armed forces.

Tompkins was transferred to Korea in June 1953 and attached to the staff of the 1st Marine Division under Major General Randolph M. Pate. At the time of his arrival, the 1st Division was stationed along the U.N. lines and was tasked with the fortifying the outposts cities in the defensive line.

During the night on July 24, Chinese forces launched a massive attack in the Outpost Esther sector and broke through the lines. The 5th Marines subsequently repelled the enemy attack. Tompkins was then appointed commanding officer of the 5th Marine Regiment on August 2, but the Korean Armistice Agreement was already in effect. His regiment then served as the defense force of the Korean Demilitarized Zone and took part in several training and athletic programs in order to improve morale and combat preparedness.

Tompkins was relieved by Colonel Elby D. Martin on February 1, 1954, and transferred to the division staff as an intelligence officer. Tompkins was ordered back to the States in July and received his second Bronze Star Medal with Combat "V" for his service in Korea.

Upon his return stateside, Tompkins took the Senior Course at Naval War College in Newport, Rhode Island, beginning August 1954. He graduated in June 1955 and was appointed to the staff of the Naval War College as assistant head of Strategy and Tactics Department. Tompkins later promoted to the head of this department and also served as senior Marine member on the staff of the college.

In July 1957, Tompkins was ordered to Camp Pendleton, California, to assume command of 1st Marine Service Battalion (Reinforced), 1st Marine Division. His battalion consisted of an engineer company, signal company, military police company, ordnance company, supply company, transport company and several Marine ammo platoons. Tompkins was then appointed the division's operations officer in December 1957 and served in this capacity until March 1958.

Tompkins was subsequently ordered to Okinawa, Japan, and appointed chief of staff, 3rd Marine Division under Major General David M. Shoup. An unusual situation came up when General Shoup was ordered to the United States for new assignment and there was no assistant division commander at the same time. Tompkins, although only a colonel, assumed temporary command of the division on April 2, 1959. He was relieved by Brigadier Lewis C. Hudson on May 8 and resumed his duties as chief of staff.

Although Tompkins was not promoted to general's rank immediately, he had drawn attention to himself. He was ordered stateside in June 1959 and subsequently appointed head of Military Personnel Procurement Branch, Personnel Division at Headquarters Marine Corps under Major General August Larson, director of personnel. In June 1960, Tompkins was appointed assistant director to General Larson and finally promoted to the rank of brigadier general one month later.

Tompkins left Washington in September 1962 for an appointment as assistant division commander, 2nd Marine Division at Camp Lejeune, North Carolina. Tompkins served under Major General Frederick L. Wieseman, and when the Cuban Missile Crisis occurred in October 1962, he was deployed with the division to Guantanamo Bay, Cuba. He returned with the division to the United States in December.

Tompkins was appointed temporary 2nd Division commander in June 1963, when General Wieseman was ordered to Quantico for a new assignment. He was relieved by Major General William J. Van Ryzin on September 27, 1963. Tompkins then resumed his duties as assistant division commander until March 1964. For his service with the 2nd Division, Tompkins was decorated with the Joint Service Commendation Medal.

== Dominican Crisis ==
Tompkins' promotion to major general came on March 1, 1964, and Tompkins became deputy chief of staff, United States Atlantic Fleet, under Admiral Harold P. Smith. He was serving with the Atlantic Fleet at the headquarters in Norfolk, Virginia, when the Dominican Civil War broke out in April 1965. Joint Task Force 122 (JTF-122) was activated on April 28, 1964, to protect Americans in the Dominican Republic, with Vice Admiral Kleber S. Masterson in command and Major General Tompkins as his deputy.

The command staff of JTF-122 departed Norfolk by air early on April 29 and, after a short briefing by Rear Admiral Henry H. Caldwell, Commander of Caribbean Sea Frontier, at Ramey Air Force Base, Puerto Rico, they sailed for the Dominican Republic aboard the destroyer USS Leahy. Masterson, Tompkins and the staff of JTF-122 began planning the operation. The mission was to secure airfield with the 3rd Army Brigade and advance east and north to search for rebel forces. Then they would establish a roadblock and cooperate with loyal Dominican Republic forces. Tompkins participated in the negotiating between U.S. Ambassador William T. Bennett and Colonel Pedro Bartolomé Benoit, president of the junta. On May 7, Tompkins was ordered back to the United States and decorated with the Legion of Merit with Combat "V" for his service in Dominican Republic. He then resumed his duties in Norfolk, Virginia, until June 1966.

== Vietnam War ==
Tompkins was appointed commanding general of the Marine Corps Recruit Depot Parris Island, South Carolina. In this capacity, he was responsible for the training of new marine recruits for the units deployed in South Vietnam. Under his command, approximately over 20,000 recruits were trained. Tompkins received his second Legion of Merit for his service at Parris Island.

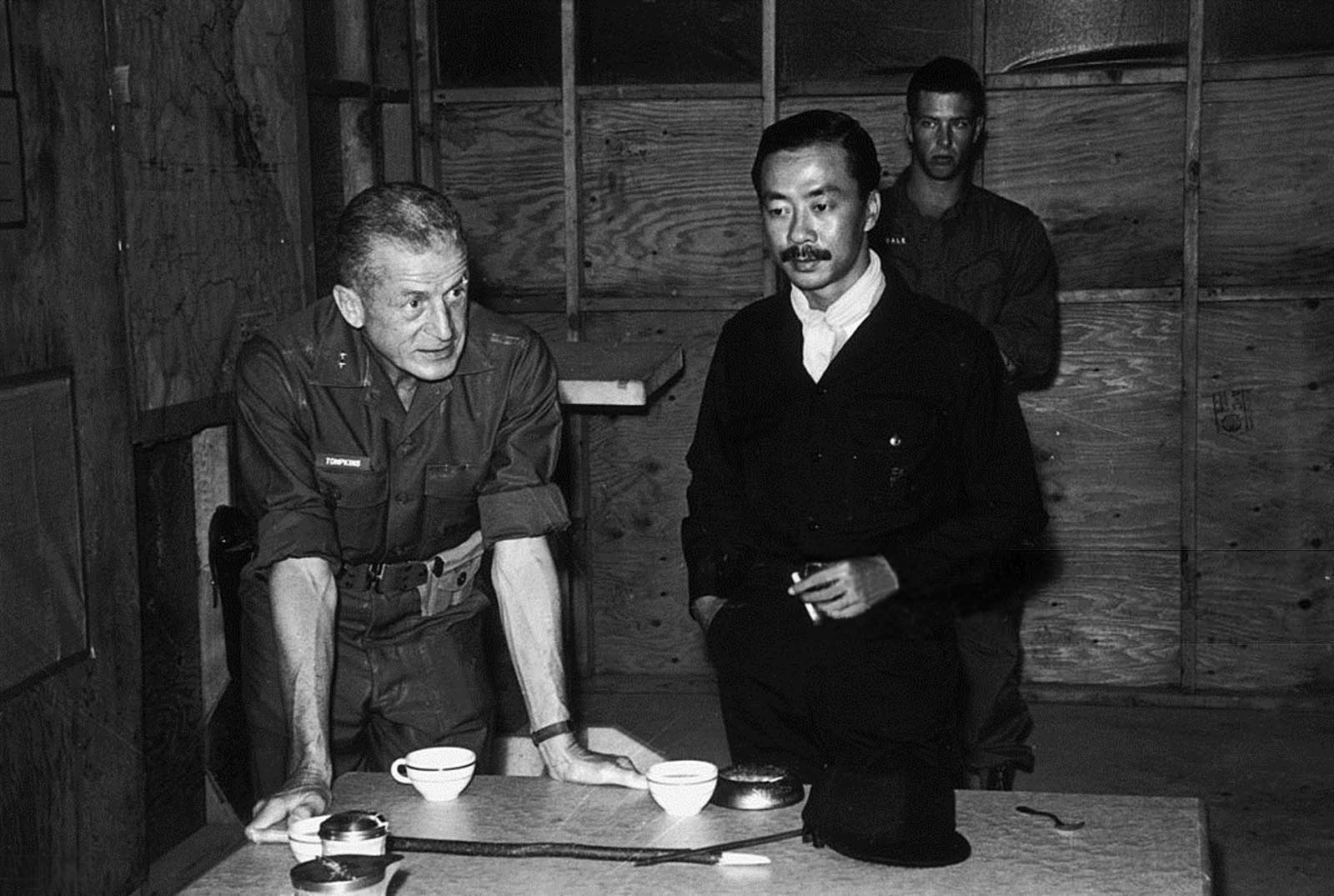
Tompkins and South Vietnamese Vice president Nguyễn Cao Kỳ during a briefing at Đông Hà Combat Base, 24 December 1967

On November 14, 1967, Major General Bruno Hochmuth, commander of the 3rd Marine Division, died when his helicopter crashed 5 miles (8.0 km) northwest of Huế. When Chief of Staff, Headquarters Marine Corps Lieutenant General Henry W. Buse Jr. called from Washington one week later to ask Tompkins how soon he could leave for Vietnam, the new 3rd Marine Division commander replied: "Tomorrow."

Tompkins arrived at Da Nang on November 28 and relieved Brigadier General Louis Metzger, division assistant commander, who had assumed temporary command of the division. After familiarizing himself with the situation, Tompkins ordered the units of the 3rd Division to take part in the clearing operation around Con Thien and Gio Linh. It was small unit fighting which lasted until December; the Marines killed almost 200 People's Army of Vietnam (PAVN) soldiers and destroyed three extensive bunker systems.

=== Khe Sanh ===
At the end of December 1967, Tompkins received intelligence reports that the forward echelon of the PAVN 304th Division had crossed the border with Laos and the 325th Division was advancing southward from the Vietnamese Demilitarized Zone. Both divisions moved to the Khe Sanh region and Tompkins began to strengthen the Khe Sanh Combat Base with another battalion and prepared it for deployment of more reinforcements.

With the beginning of new year, PAVN troops increased their activity in the region and all indications pointed to the beginning of an offensive similar to the one in 1967, only on a much larger scale. The intelligence reports pointed to the influx of individual regiments, division headquarters and other support units. The PAVN switched from reconnaissance to attacks on Marine outposts and began shelling them with artillery. Tompkins, who had 24,000 men under his command, placed a high priority to on the construction of base fortifications.

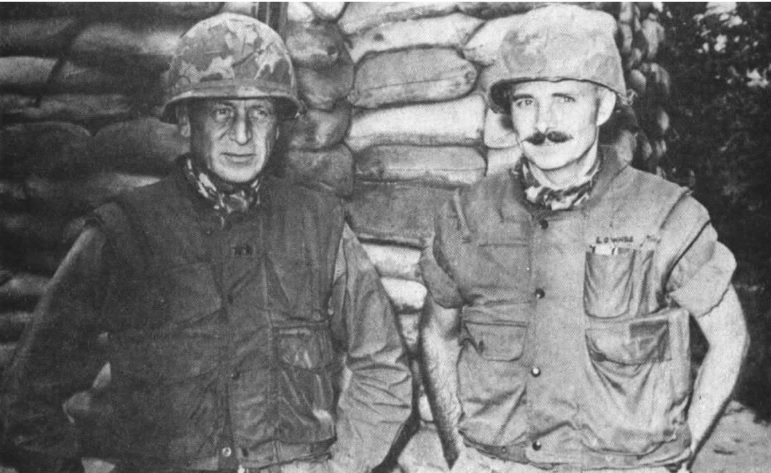
Tompkins and David E. Lownds (26th Marine Regiment) at Khe Sanh Combat Base.

PAVN commander General Võ Nguyên Giáp ordered the capture of the base at the end of January 1968, and the Khe Sanh base was quickly encircled. PAVN troops tried to penetrate the base, but every attack was repelled. The only possible way to bring in reinforcements and supplies was by air. PAVN sappers penetrated the perimeter at night to place mines and traps in the target zone. Marine combat engineers were tasked every morning with the cleaning of the zone. Moreover, the weather was very bad, and the northeast monsoon hit the whole Khe Sanh Valley. Despite all these factors, Tompkins did not hesitate to make daily inspection trips of the frontline units, even the most isolated ones, which provided him first-hand knowledge of the tactical situation in the area.

The 3rd Marine Division, under his command, successfully defended the Khe Sanh base until the beginning of April 1968, when the PAVN encirclement was broken. Tompkins was subsequently decorated with the Navy Distinguished Service Medal for his defense of Khe Sanh. He also received numerous decorations from South Vietnamese government.

=== Later service in Vietnam ===
Historian Max Hastings, in his analysis of the Battle of Dai Do (27 April to 2 May 1968) where Marines were repeatedly ordered to attack dug in PAVN positions, states that Tompkins and Colonel Milton Hull were guilty of "sustained folly of Crimean proportions". The 2/4th Marine battalion sustained 378 casualties, of which 81 were killed, one platoon started off with 48 Marines and ended up with three. Hastings found it extraordinary that Tompkins and Hull insisted on continuing the frontal assaults when they had little idea what enemy were present and despite repeated requests to break off the action by the commanders on the spot.

In May 1968, Deputy Commander of the III Marine Amphibious Force Major General William J. Van Ryzin was transferred back to Washington, D.C., and appointed Chief of Staff, Headquarters Marine Corps. The commanding general of the III MAF, Lieutenant General Robert E. Cushman, selected Tompkins as Van Ryzin's successor. Tompkins served in this capacity until he was ordered back to the United States in December 1968 under the rotation policy.

=== Stateside duty ===
Tompkins returned to the United States at the beginning of January 1969 and relieved Major General Joseph O. Butcher as commanding general of Camp Lejeune, North Carolina. In this capacity, he was responsible for the training of Marine personnel in amphibious warfare. Men trained under his command were usually ordered to Vietnam to reinforce Marine units. Tompkins remained in this capacity until June 30, 1971, when he was relieved by another Vietnam War veteran, Major General Carl A. Youngdale.

Tompkins retired after more than 36 years of Marine Corps service and received his second Navy Distinguished Service Medal for his excellent service at Camp Lejeune during his retirement ceremony.

== Retirement ==
Following his retirement, Tompkins settled in Beaufort, South Carolina, where he lived until his death. In his retirement, he was a member of the commandant's advisory committee on Marine Corps History. Tompkins participated in the annual sessions, together with Louis H. Wilson Jr., Alpha L. Bowser, Norman J. Anderson and Richard C. Mangrum and Edwin H. Simmons.

Major General Rathvon M. Tompkins died on September 17, 1999, following a stroke. He is buried at Arlington National Cemetery, Virginia, together with his wife, Julia Lindsly Vogel Tompkins (1920–2013), daughter of Major General Clayton B. Vogel.

== Decorations ==
Tompkins was decorated with the Navy Cross, the United States military's second highest decoration awarded for valor in combat for his heroism during the Battle of Saipan on June 17, 1944. He was then a lieutenant colonel serving as commanding officer of the 1st Battalion, 29th Marine Regiment, attached to the 2nd Marine Division. His citation states in part:

Summoned from a distant section of the front when the commanding officer of a hard-pressed battalion became a casualty, Lieutenant Colonel Tompkins found that the unit's advance had been held up by a swamp heavily infested with Japanese snipers, a cliff honeycombed with powerful hostile gun emplacements, and an elaborate trench system in a coconut grove. Determined to seize these terrain features before dusk, he unhesitatingly risked his life to make a hasty reconnaissance of the front lines. Rallying the weary troops who had fought bitterly all day with but slight gain, he skillfully disposed his tanks for maximum combat efficiency and led his men in a brilliantly executed attack against these vital objectives, waging battle with relentless fury and reducing the Japanese strongpoints according to plan. An inspiring leader, Lieutenant Colonel Tompkins, by his bold tactics, decisive judgment and indomitable fighting spirit in the face of overwhelming opposition, contributed essentially to the ultimate conquest of this important enemy base, and his great personal valor and constant devotion to duty throughout a period of fierce hostilities reflect the highest credit upon himself and the United States Naval Service.

Here is the ribbon bar of Major General Rathvon M. Tompkins:

1st Row	Navy Cross		Navy Distinguished Service Medal with one 5/16" Gold Star	Silver Star
2nd Row	Legion of Merit with one 5/16" Gold Star and Combat "V"	Bronze Star Medal with one 5/16" Gold Star and Combat "V"	Purple Heart	Joint Service Commendation Medal
3rd Row	Reserve Good Conduct Medal	Navy Presidential Unit Citation with one star	Navy Unit Commendation with one star	Marine Corps Expeditionary Medal with one star
4th Row	American Defense Service Medal with Base Clasp	European–African–Middle Eastern Campaign Medal	Asiatic-Pacific Campaign Medal with four 3/16 inch service stars	American Campaign Medal
5th Row	World War II Victory Medal	National Defense Service Medal with one star	Korean Service Medal with one 3/16 inch service star	Armed Forces Expeditionary Medal
6th Row	Vietnam Service Medal with one silver and two bronze 3/16 inch service stars	National Order of Vietnam, 5th Class	Vietnam Distinguished Service Order, 1st Class	Vietnam Gallantry Cross with Palm
7th Row	United Nations Korea Medal	Republic of Korea Presidential Unit Citation	Vietnam Gallantry Cross Unit Citation	Vietnam Campaign Medal

== Publications ==
- Tompkins, Rathvon M. Ubique. Marine Corps Gazette 49, no. 9 (Sept. 1965): 32–39.

Military offices
Preceded by Joseph O. Butcher	Commanding General of the Camp Lejeune; January 1, 1969 – June 30, 1971	Succeeded by Carl A. Youngdale
Preceded by Louis Metzger	Commanding General of the 3rd Marine Division; November 28, 1967 – May 20, 1968	Succeeded by Raymond G. Davis
Preceded by James M. Masters Sr.	Commanding General of the Marine Corps Recruit Depot Parris Island; June 16, 1966 – November 22, 1967	Succeeded by Ormond R. Simpson
Preceded by Frederick L. Wieseman	Commanding General of the 2nd Marine Division; June 24 – September 26, 1963	Succeeded by William J. Van Ryzin
