= 1st Marine Division =

USMC infantry division

- Founded: 1 February 1941
- Country: United States
- Branch: United States Marine Corps
- Type: Ground combat element
- Size: Division (approximately 22,000)
- Part of: I Marine Expeditionary Force
- Garrison/HQ: Marine Corps Base Camp Pendleton
- Nicknames: The Old Breed; Blue Diamond
- Mottos: No Better Friend, No Worse Enemy
- March: "Waltzing Matilda"
- Engagements: See battles: World War II; Solomon Islands campaign; Guadalcanal campaign; New Britain campaign; Battle of Cape Gloucester; Battle of Talasea; Mariana and Palau Islands campaign; Battle of Peleliu; Volcano and Ryukyu Islands campaign; Battle of Okinawa; Chinese Civil War; Operation Beleaguer; Korean War; Battle of Inchon; Second Battle of Seoul; Battle of Chosin Reservoir; First and Second Battles of Wonju; Battle of Hwacheon; Battle of the Punchbowl; Battle of Bunker Hill (1952); First Battle of the Hook; Battle for Outpost Vegas; Battle of the Samichon River; Vietnam War; Operation Starlite; Operation Piranha; Operation Oregon; Operation Union; Operation Union II; Operation Swift; Operation Allen Brook; Tet Offensive; Battle of Khe Sanh; Operation Auburn; Battle of Huế; Operation Mameluke Thrust; Operation Imperial Lake; Gulf War; Operation Desert Storm; War on terror; Afghanistan; Iraq; Operation Inherent Resolve

Commanders
- Commander: Brig. Gen. Andrew Priddy
- Notable commanders: Holland Smith; Alexander Vandegrift; William H. Rupertus; Oliver P. Smith; James M. Masters, Sr.; Edwin A. Pollock; Herman Nickerson Jr.; James Mattis; Pedro Del Valle; Robert O. Bare; Edward W. Snedeker; Frank Libutti; Lawrence D. Nicholson

The 1st Marine Division (1st MARDIV) is a Marine division of the United States Marine Corps headquartered at Marine Corps Base Camp Pendleton, California. It is the ground combat element of the I Marine Expeditionary Force (I MEF).

It is the oldest and largest active duty division in the United States Marine Corps, representing a combat-ready force of 22,000 personnel. It is one of three active duty divisions in the Marine Corps today and is a multi-role, expeditionary ground combat force. It is nicknamed "The Old Breed".

== Mission ==
The division is employed as the ground combat element (GCE) of the I Marine Expeditionary Force or may provide task-organized forces for assault operations and such operations as may be directed. The 1st Marine Division must be able to provide the ground amphibious forcible entry capability to the naval expeditionary force (NEF) and to conduct subsequent land operations in any operational environment.

== Organization ==
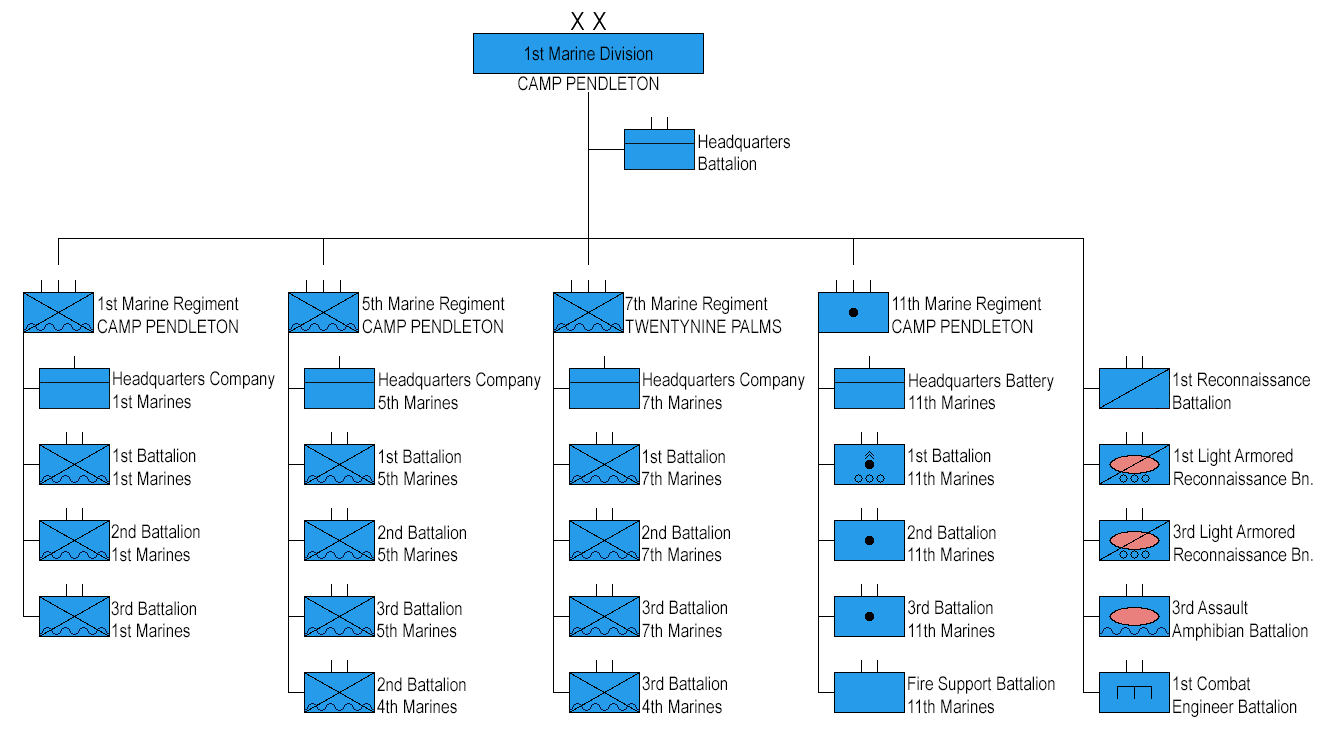
1st Marine Division organization as of May 2026 (click to enlarge)

As of May 2026 the 1st Marine Division consists of the following units:

- Headquarters Battalion
- 1st Marine Regiment
- 5th Marine Regiment
- 7th Marine Regiment
- 11th Marine Regiment (Artillery)
- 1st Reconnaissance Battalion
- 1st Light Armored Reconnaissance Battalion
- 3rd Light Armored Reconnaissance Battalion
- 1st Combat Engineer Battalion
- 3rd Assault Amphibian Battalion

== History ==
=== Inter-war years ===
The lineal forebear of the 1st Marine Division is the 1st Advance Base Brigade, which was activated on 23 December 1913 at Philadelphia, Pennsylvania. (Subsequently, the brigade was redesignated on 1 April 1914, as the 1st Brigade, and on 16 September 1935, as the 1st Marine Brigade). The brigade consisted of the Fixed Defense Regiment and the Mobile Defense Regiment, later designated as the 1st and 2nd Regiments, 1st Brigade, respectively. In 1916, while deployed in Haiti, the two regiments were again redesignated, exchanging numerals, to then become the 2nd and 1st Regiments, 1st Brigade. Between April 1914 and August 1934, elements of the 1st Brigade participated in operations in Mexico, Haiti, the Dominican Republic, and Cuba, receiving campaign credit for service in each nation. While the 1st Brigade did not serve ashore in the European theater during the First World War, the brigade was awarded the World War I Victory Medal Streamer, with one bronze star, in recognition of the brigade's service during that conflict. On 16 September 1935, the brigade was redesignated as the 1st Marine Brigade and deployed to Guantanamo Bay, Cuba in October 1940.

=== World War II ===
1st Marine Division Battle of Okinawa order of battle (click to enlarge)

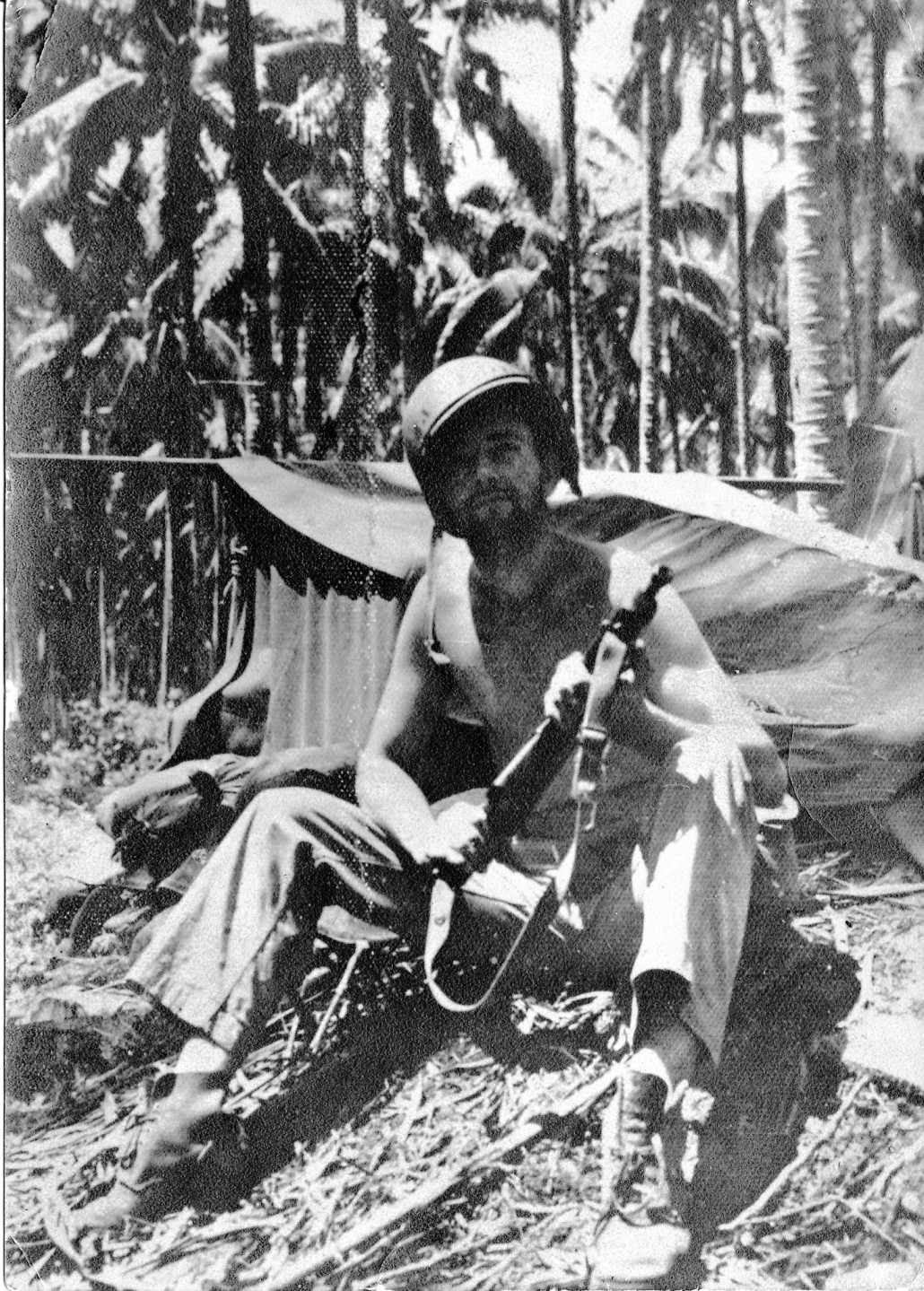
A Marine of the 1st Marine Regiment on Guadalcanal.

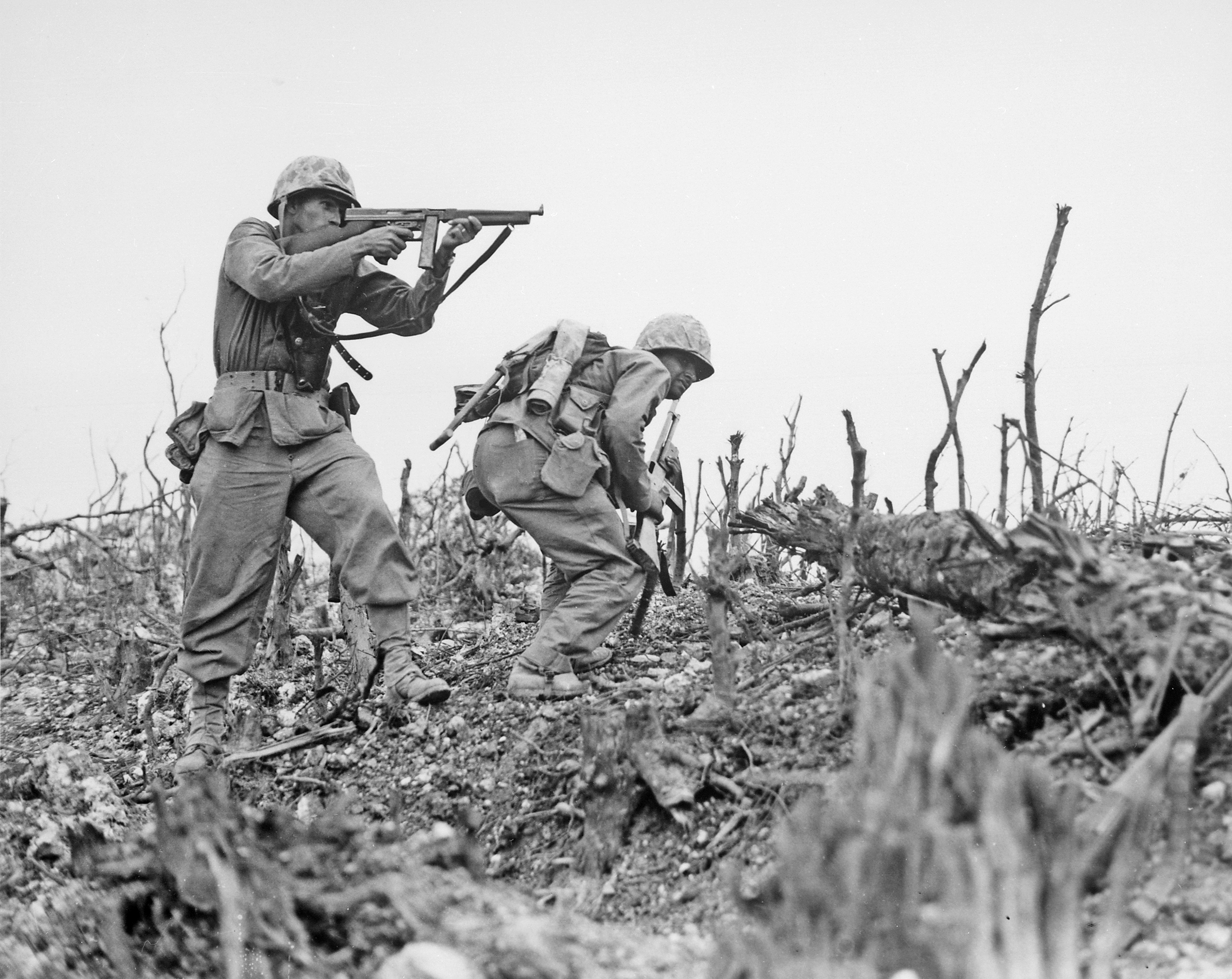
Marines of 1st Marine Division fighting on Okinawa, 1945.

The 1st Marine Division was activated aboard the USS Texas on 1 February 1941. In May 1941, the 1st MARDIV relocated to Quantico, Virginia and Parris Island, South Carolina and in April 1942, the division began deploying to the Samoan Islands and Wellington, New Zealand. The division's units were scattered over the Pacific Ocean with the support elements and the 1st Marine Regiment transported en route to New Zealand on three ships, the USATs Ericsson, Barnett and Elliott from Naval Reserve Air Base Oakland to New Zealand, and later were landed on the island of Guadalcanal, part of the Japanese-occupied Solomon Islands, on 7 August 1942.

Initially, only the 7th Marine Regiment was in garrison on Western Samoa, with the 5th Marine Regiment having just encamped at Wellington after disembarking from USAT Wakefield, and the 1st Marine Regiment not scheduled to arrive in New Zealand until 11 July. The 1st Raider Battalion was on New Caledonia, and the 3rd Defense Battalion was in Pearl Harbor. All of the division's units, with the 11th Marines (artillery) and 75mm howitzer armed 10th Marines battalion would rendezvous at British Fiji.

Due to the change in orders and shortage of attack and combat cargo vessels, all of the division's 2.5-ton trucks, M1918 155-mm howitzers and the sound and flash-ranging equipment needed for counter-battery fire had to be left in Wellington. Also, because the Wellington dock workers were on strike at the time, the Marines had to do all the load reconfiguration from administrative to combat configuration.

After eleven days of logistical challenges, the division, with 16,000 Marines, departed Wellington in eighty-nine ships embarked for the Solomon Islands with a sixty-day combat load which did not include tents, spare clothing or bedrolls, office equipment, unit muster rolls, or pay clerks. Other things not yet available to this first wave of Marine deployments were insect repellent and mosquito netting. Attached to the division was the 1st Parachute Battalion, which along with the rest of the division, conducted landing rehearsals from 28 to 30 July on Koro Island, which Major General Alexander Vandegrift described as a "disaster".

On 31 July the Marine task force was placed under the command of Vice Admiral Frank J. Fletcher's Task Force 61. The division as a whole would fight in the Guadalcanal campaign until relieved at 14:00 on 9 December 1942 by the Army's Americal Division commanded by Lieutenant General Alexander Patch. This operation won the division its first of three World War II Presidential Unit Citations (PUC). The battle would cost the division 650 killed in action, 1,278 wounded in action with a further 8,580 contracting malaria and 31 missing in action. Others were awarded for the battles of Peleliu and Okinawa.

Following the Guadalcanal campaign, the division's Marines were sent to Melbourne, Australia for rest and refit. It was during this time that the division took the traditional Australian folk song "Waltzing Matilda" as its battle hymn. To this day, 1st Division Marines still ship out to this song being played.

The division would next see action during Operation Cartwheel which was the codename for the campaigns in Eastern New Guinea and New Britain. They came ashore at the Battle of Cape Gloucester on 26 December 1943 and fought on New Britain until March 1944 at such places as Suicide Creek and Ajar Ridge. During the course of the battle the division had 310 killed and 1,083 wounded. Following the battle they were sent to Pavuvu in the Russell Islands for rest and refitting.

The next battle for the 1st Marine Division would be the bloodiest yet at the Battle of Peleliu. They landed on 15 September 1944 as part of the III Amphibious Corps assault on the island. The division's commanding general, Major General William H. Rupertus had predicted the fighting would be, "...tough but short. It'll be over in three or four days – a fight like Tarawa. Rough but fast. Then we can go back to the rest area." Making a mockery of the prediction, the first week of the battle alone cost the division 3,946 casualties, during which time they secured the key airfield sites. The division fought on Peleliu for one month before being relieved. Some of the most severe fighting of the war took place in places such as Bloody Nose Ridge and the central ridges of the island that made up the Umurbrogol Pocket. The month of fighting against the 14th Division on Peleliu cost the 1st Marine Division 1,252 dead and 5,274 wounded.

The final campaign the division would take part in during World War II would be the Battle of Okinawa. The strategic importance of Okinawa was that it provided a fleet anchorage, troop staging areas, and airfields in close proximity to Japan. The division landed on 1 April 1945 as part of the III Amphibious Corps. Its initial mission was, fighting alongside the 6th Marine Division, to clear the northern half of the island – that they were able to do expeditiously. The Army's XXIV Corps met much stiffer resistance in the south, and on 1 May 1945 the Marine division was moved south where it relieved the Army 27th Infantry Division. The division was in heavy fighting on Okinawa until 22 June 1945, when the island was declared secure. The 1st Marine Division fought the Japanese 32nd Army at such places as Dakeshi Ridge, Wana Ridge, "Sugarloaf Hill" and Shuri Castle. Fighting on Okinawa cost the division 1,655 killed in action.

During the war, the division had five Seabee Battalions posted to it. The 6th Naval Construction Battalion (NCB) was attached to the 1st Marine Division on Guadalcanal. They were followed by the 19th NCB which was assigned to the 17th Marines as the third battalion of the regiment. They landed at Cape Gloucester with the division. The 17th Marines were inactivated with the 19th NCB being reassigned. After that, the 33rd NCB was posted to the 1st for the assault on Peleliu and they were replaced by the 145th NCB for the invasion of Okinawa. (see:Seabees) On Peleliu, the 17th Special NCB (segregated) was assigned to the 1st Pioneers as shore party. Together with the 16th Marines Field Depot (segregated) they helped evacuate wounded and bury the dead for the 7th Marines. On the first night of the assault, nearly all of the 17th Seabees volunteered to hump ammo to the frontlines. They also reinforced the Marines in sections where directed, were used to crew a 37 mm, and were used for several days. For their efforts, they received an official "well done". The 33rd NCB also had 202 men assigned to the shore party.

Following the surrender of Japan, the division was sent to Northern China as the lead combat element of the III Amphibious Corps with the primary mission of preventing the People's Liberation Army from accepting the surrender of Japanese soldiers there, and to secure the region for the Nationalist Government. They landed at Taku on 30 September 1945 and were based in Hebei Province in the cities of Tianjin and Beijing, and also on the Shandong Peninsula, with the Chinese Civil War between the Kuomintang and Chinese Communist Party raging around them. Most Marines in the division would be charged with guarding supply trains, bridges, and depots to keep food and coal moving into the cities. During this time they increasingly fought skirmishes with soldiers from the People's Liberation Army who raided ambushed, and harassed the railways and other infrastructure.

By the summer of 1946 the division was suffering the effects of demobilization and its combat efficiency had dropped below wartime standards, yet its commitments in China remained. As it became clear that a complete collapse of truce negotiations among the Chinese factions was apparent, plans were laid for the withdrawal of all Marine units from Hebei. The last elements of the division finally left China on 1 September 1947.

=== Korean War ===
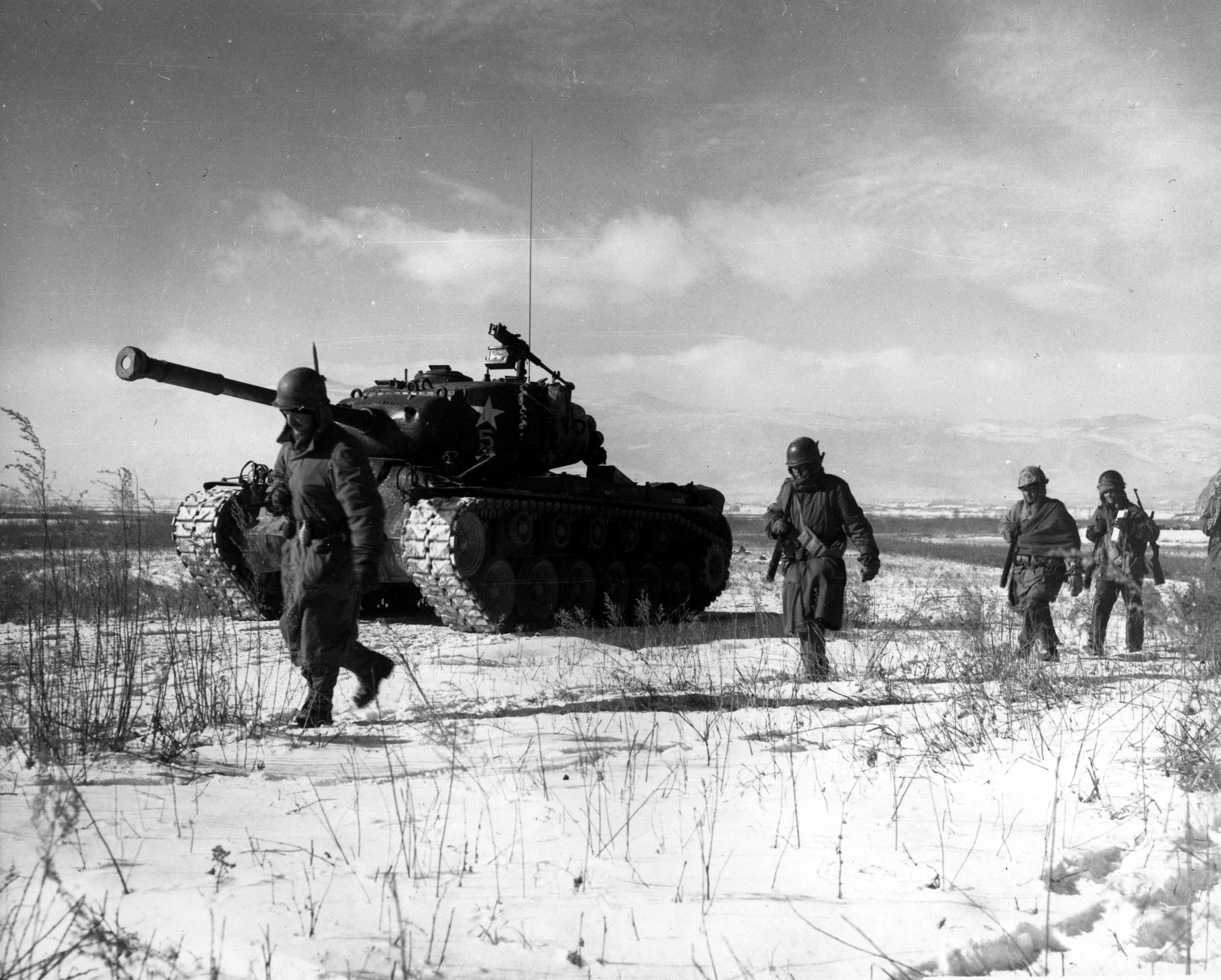
Marines of 1st Marine Division at the Battle of Chosin Reservoir.

Following the end of World War II and the postwar drawdown of forces, by 1950 the division only possessed the strength of a reinforced regimental combat team. The division would be assembled on the battle field and would participate in the amphibious assault at Inchon under the orders of United Nations Command (UN) commander General MacArthur. The division was the unit chosen to lead the Inchon landing on 15 September 1950. At Inchon, the division faced one of its most daunting challenges, deploying so hurriedly it still lacked its third infantry regiment and ordered to execute an amphibious assault under the worst tidal conditions they had ever faced. After the landing they moved north and after heavy fighting in Seoul they liberated the city.

After the liberation of Seoul, the division was put back on ships and taken to the eastern side of the Korean peninsula and landed at Wonsan on 26 October. As part of X Corps commanded by Army Major General Edward Almond the division was ordered to push north towards the Yalu River as fast as possible. The then commanding officer of the division, Major General O.P. Smith, did not agree with his superiors and had become convinced that they were stretched thin and that the Chinese Forces had entered the war. He purposely slowed his advance and consolidated along the way at every opportunity. The 1st Marine Division was attacked by ten Chinese People's Volunteer Army (PVA) infantry divisions on 27 November 1950. They fought their way out of the Chosin Reservoir against seven PVA divisions suffering over 900 killed and missing, over 3,500 wounded and more than 6,500 non-battle casualties mostly from frostbite during the battle. The greater part of the PVA 9th Army was rendered ineffective as they suffered an estimated 37,500 casualties trying to stop the Marines' march out of the "Frozen Chosin". The division was evacuated from Hungnam in mid-December and then landed in Pusan.

Beginning in early 1951 the division participated in several UN offensives in east-central Korea. This was followed by defending against the Chinese Spring Offensive. By June 1951 the 1st Marine Division had pushed northward and secured the Punchbowl and then settled into a defensive line 11 miles (18 km) long.

In mid-March 1952 the 8th Army, to whom the Marines were attached, instituted Operation Bootdrop. The operation was a massive redeployment of UN forces designed to put more Republic of Korea Army units on the Jamestown Line, the UN's Main line of resistance (MLR). The 1st Marine Division was reassigned to the far western end of the MLR defending a 35 miles (56 km) line that encompassed the Pyongyang to Seoul corridor. For much of the next year, in what would be termed the "Outpost War", action along this line consisted of small, localized actions because much of the fighting revolved around the holding and retaking of various combat outposts along the MLR, including the Battles of Bunker Hill, First Hook and Outpost Vegas. Fighting continued until the Armistice took effect on 27 July 1953. During the Korean War the division suffered combat casualties of 4,004 dead and 25,864 wounded.

In 1953 the division command post was established at Tonggu. The site was later named Camp Howze by the US Army. A memorial to—US and ROK—Marine participation in the war is located at the adjoining district of Bongilcheon-ri (봉일천리) (37°43′52″N 126°49′59″E).

==== Republic of Korea Marines ====
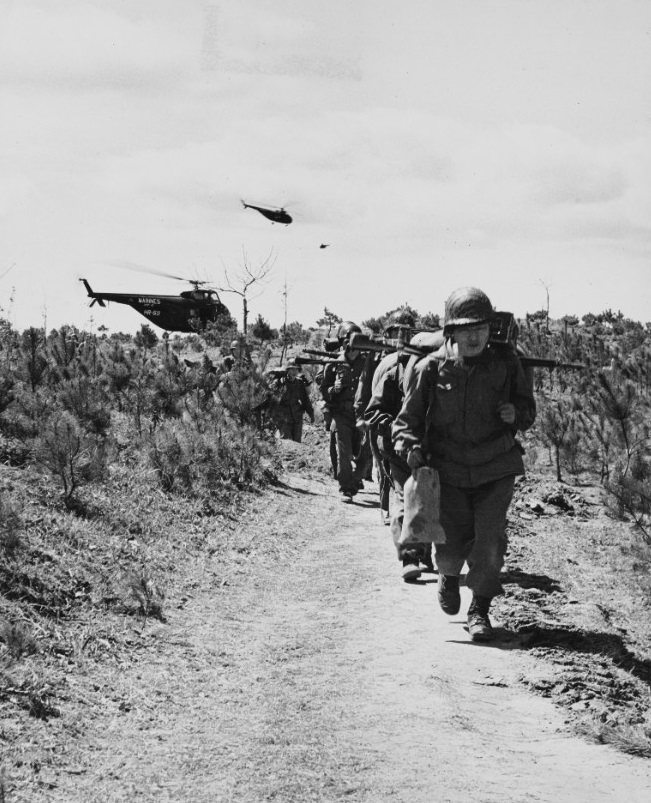
U.S. Marine Sikorsky HRS helicopters disembarking South Korean marines in April 1952

In the spring of 1952, the 1st Marine Division, along with the ROKMC 1st Regiment, received orders to move across the peninsula to western Korea. The regiment was the first unit to move to its new positions along the extreme left flank of the Eighth Army, where it was given the mission of guarding the approaches to Seoul along the Jamestown Line. By 24 March, the 1st Marine Division and ROKMC 1st Regiment had relieved elements of the ROK 1st Division along the left sector of the main line of resistance, adjacent to the 1st Commonwealth Division, and were in position to continue sector outpost security and ground defense in what had become a war of attrition.

On 20 March 1952 the ROKMC 1st Regiment assumed responsibility for its portion of the Jamestown Line between the Kimpo Provisional Regiment and the 1st Marines (replaced by the 5th Marines on 29 March. From 25 to 31 March the PVA made five separate probing attacks against the ROKMC 1st Regiment. On 1 April the KPA launched an attack on the ROKMC 1st Regiment positions in an attempt to capture the Freedom Gate Bridge over the Imjin River but were pushed back by dawn on 2 April. On 12–13 April the PVA increased their attacks by fire and infantry probes of the 1st Marine Division sector and on the night of 17 April launched an attack on the ROKMC 1st Regiment positions but this was beaten back with small arms and artillery fire with the ROKMC 1st Regiment losing two dead while the PVA lost 36 killed. On 23 and 24 April the 1st Marine Division withdrew from most of its outpost line reducing the vulnerability of these isolated positions and strengthening the main line of resistance.

=== Vietnam War ===
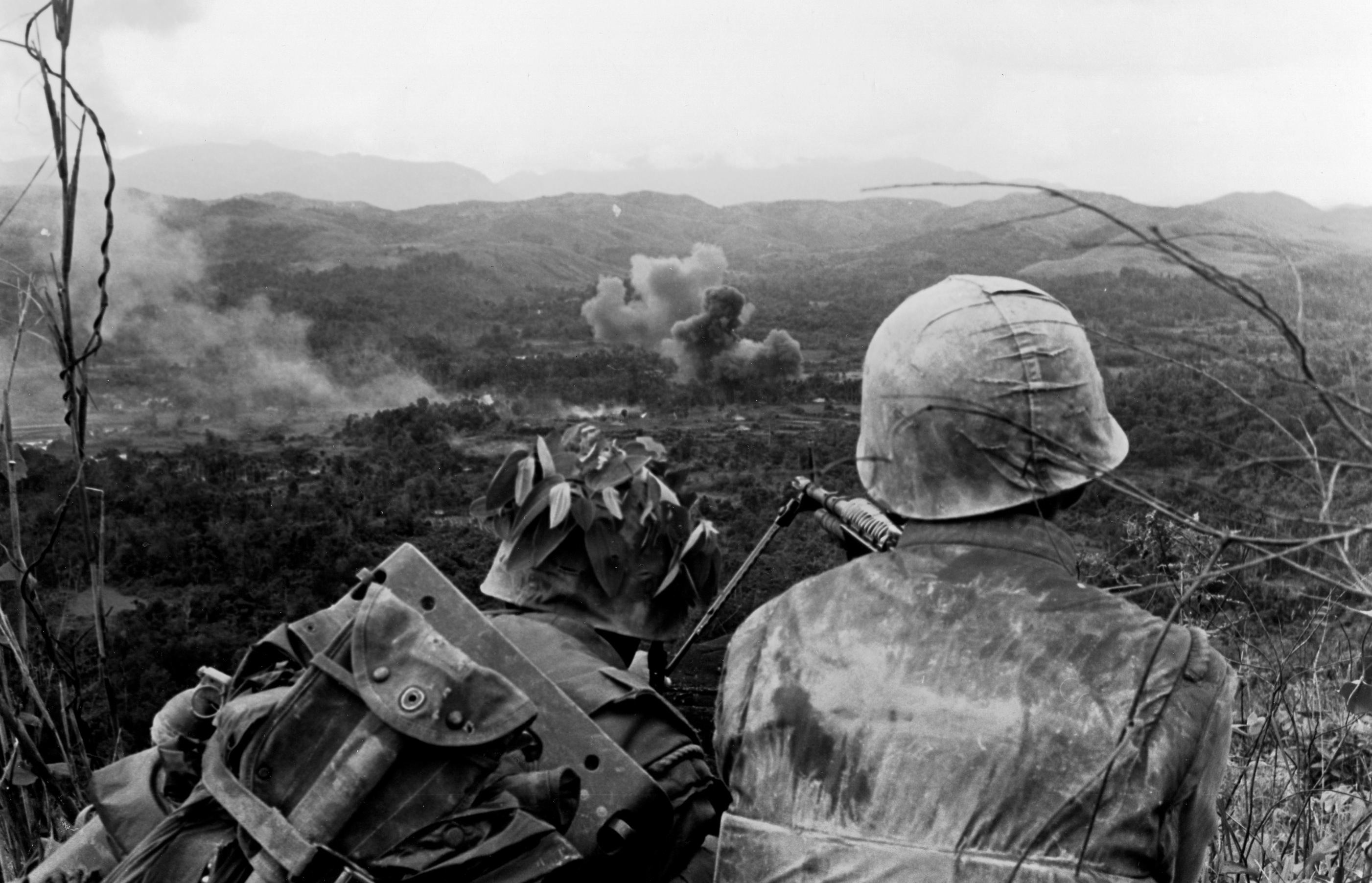
3/3 Marines observe an airstrike during Operation Harvest Moon

In August 1965, the division's 7th Marine Regiment participated in Operation Starlite, the first major engagement against the Vietcong (VC) for American ground troops in South Vietnam. This was followed in September by Operation Piranha. In December Division elements conducted Operation Harvest Moon.

In March 1966, division elements conducted Operations Utah, Oregon and Texas. March also saw the 1st Marine Division Headquarters established at Chu Lai. By June, the entire division was in South Vietnam, its Tactical Area of Responsibility (TAOR) was the southern two provinces of I Corps — Quang Tin and Quang Ngai. In August the division conducted Operation Colorado. In October the 3rd Marine Division was moved north from Da Nang and the division assumed the responsibility for the Da Nang TAOR in addition to the Chu Lai TAOR. The division headquarters was moved from Chu Lai to Da Nang on 10 October. Between March and October 1966 to May 1967, the division conducted 44 named operations. The division received its 7th Presidential Unit Citation for service from 29 March 1966 to 15 September 1967.

From January to April 1967, the 7th Marines conducted Operation Desoto. In early April 1967 under Operation Oregon the division moved north to Da Nang to support the 3rd Marine Division and Task Force Oregon took over the division's former TAOR. From April to May Division units conducted Operations Union and Beaver Cage. From May to June the 5th Marine Regiment conducted Operation Union II with Army of the Republic of Vietnam (ARVN) forces. In September Division units and ARVN forces conducted Operation Swift. In November the 5th Marines conducted Operation Essex. On 4 December 1967 Task Force X-Ray was activated to implement Operation Checkers, the movement of the 1st Marine Division north into Thừa Thiên Province to support the 3rd Marine Division which was engaged in heavy combat along the Vietnamese Demilitarized Zone. From 28 December 1967 to 3 January 1968 Division units conducted Operation Auburn on Go Noi Island south of Da Nang.

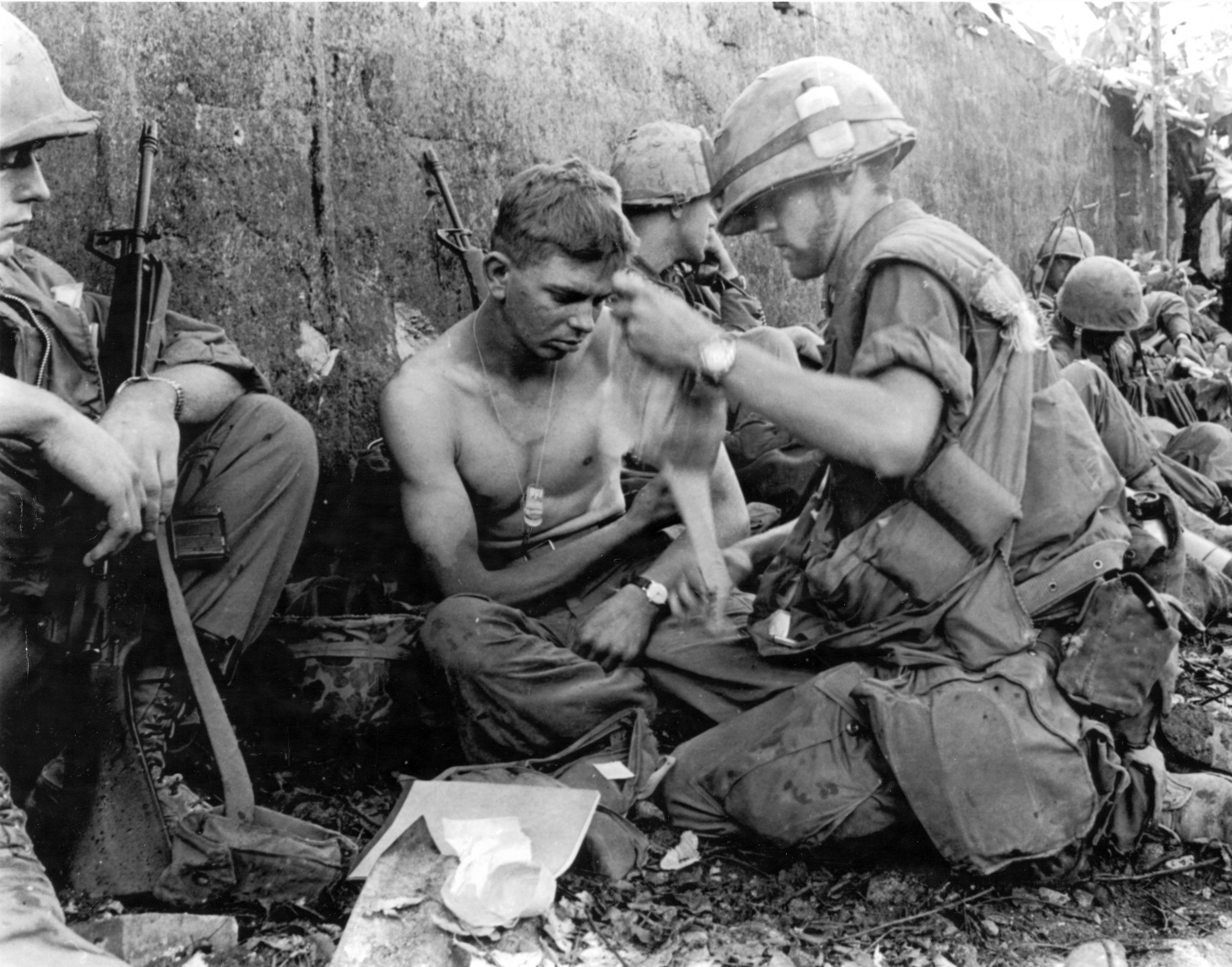
A wounded 2/5 Marine receives treatment during the Battle of Huế

On 11 January 1968, Task Force X-Ray headquarters was established at Phu Bai Combat Base and assumed operational control of the 5th Marine Regiment which moved north from Da Nang and the 1st Marine Regiment already based at Phu Bai. When the 1968 Tet Offensive began at the end of January, the division was involved in fierce fighting with PAVN/VC throughout its TAOR and together with ARVN units would defend Da Nang and fight the Battle of Huế. The 1st Marines would receive a Presidential Unit Citation for its actions at Huế. From May to August Division units conducted Operation Allen Brook on Go Noi Island. From May to October Division units conducted Operation Mameluke Thrust in Happy Valley southwest of Da Nang. From 1 to 19 October Division units conducted Operation Maui Peak to relieve Thường Ðức Camp. From late October to early December the 5th Marines conducted Operation Henderson Hill in Happy Valley. From 20 November to 9 December Division units conducted Operation Meade River south of Da Nang. From 6 December to 8 March 1969 Division units conducted Operation Taylor Common in the An Hoa Basin west of Hội An.

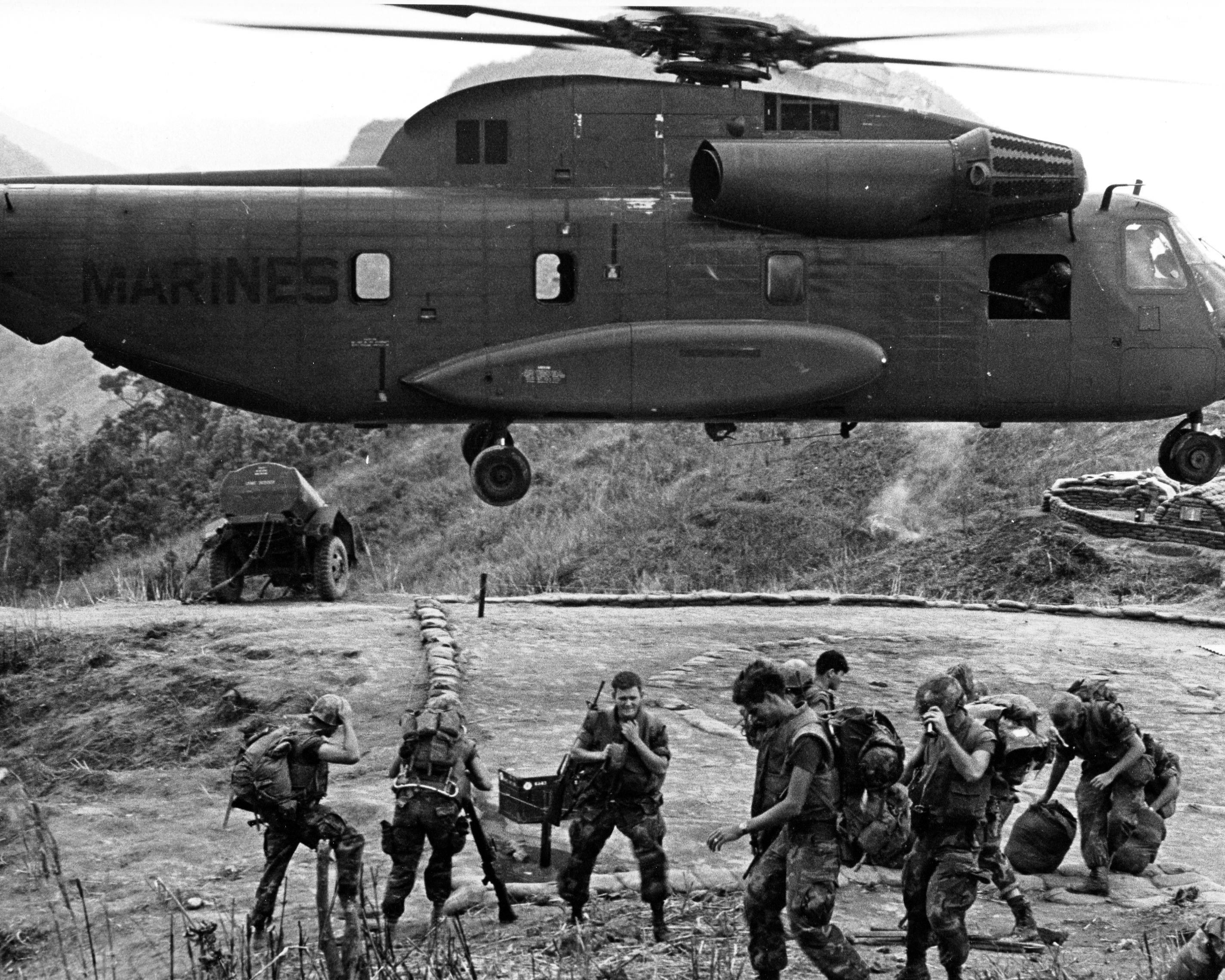
1/5 Marines await a helicopter during Operation Imperial Lake

From 31 March to 29 May 1969, Division and ARVN units conducted Operation Oklahoma Hills southwest of Da Nang. From 26 May to 7 November Division, ARVN and Republic of Korea Marine Corps (ROKMC) units conducted Operation Pipestone Canyon on Go Noi Island. On 7 June PFC Dan Bullock of 2/5 Marines was killed in a PAVN sapper attack on An Hoa Combat Base, having lied about his age to enlist, he was, at 15 years old, the youngest American killed in the war.

From July to August 1970, Division units conducted Operation Pickens Forest southwest of An Hoa Combat Base. From 1 September to 7 May 1971 Division and ROKMC units conducted Operation Imperial Lake in the Quế Sơn District south of Da Nang.

On 13 January 1971, Operation Keystone Robin Charlie began with the standing down of the initial units supporting the division. The redeployment accelerated in mid-February but then slowed when HMH-463, HML-167, HMM-263 and MASS-3 were retained to support Operation Lam Son 719. Throughout April the remaining Division units transferred bases and tactical areas of responsibility to the Americal Division. On 14 April 1971 the 3rd Marine Amphibious Brigade was activated at Camp Jay K. Brooks and III Marine Amphibious Force transferred all remaining Marine forces to it. On 30 April President Richard Nixon welcomed the division back to Camp Pendleton and awarded it a second Presidential Unit Citation for its service in South Vietnam.

The division lost 7,012 men killed in action in South Vietnam.

In 1975, the division supported the resettlement of South Vietnamese refugees by providing food and temporary shelter at Camp Pendleton for Vietnamese refugees as they arrived in the United States.

=== Desert Shield and Desert Storm ===
In 1990, the 1st Marine Division formed the nucleus of the massive force sent to the Middle East in response to Ba'athist Iraq's invasion of Kuwait. During Operation Desert Shield, the division supported I Marine Expeditionary Force (I MEF) in the defense of Saudi Arabia from the Iraqi threat. In 1991, the division went on the offensive as part of U.S. Marine Forces Central Command (MARCENT) with the rest of Coalition Forces in Operation Desert Storm. The 1st Marine Division destroyed around 60 Iraqi tanks near the Burgan oil field without suffering any losses. These efforts were instrumental in the liberation of Kuwait from Iraqi forces.

=== 1992 Los Angeles riots ===
On 2 May 1992, the 1st Marine Division took part of Operation Garden Plot to help local and state law enforcement as well as the California Army National Guard in quelling the Rodney King riots in Los Angeles County, California. It was part of the 3,500 federal military force sent to Los Angeles. The Marine Corps contingent included the 1st Light Armored Reconnaissance Battalion, commanded by Marine Corps General John F. Kelly. As part of the Joint Special Purpose Marine Air Ground Task Force Los Angeles, Marines took up positions in Compton and Long Beach to prevent further rioting and disorder. No rioters or civilians were killed or injured by the Marines, nor did the Marines themselves suffer any casualties. On 10 May, six days after the riots ended, Marines formally withdrew from the city and returned to Camp Pendleton.

=== 1990s humanitarian relief ===
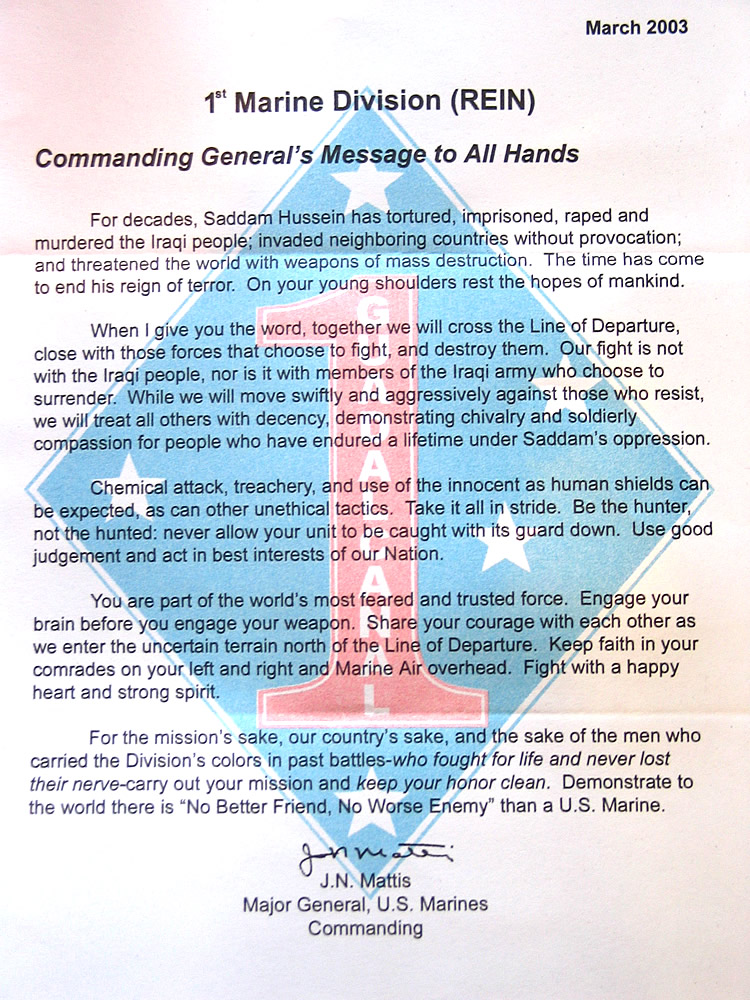
Letter by Gen Mattis distributed throughout division before the 2003 invasion of Iraq

Immediately following the Gulf War, the division sent units to assist in relief efforts following a typhoon in Bangladesh (Operation Sea Angel) and the eruption of volcano Mount Pinatubo in the Philippines (Operation Fiery Vigil). In December 1992, Operation Restore Hope, bringing relief to famine-stricken Somalia, kicked off with the early morning amphibious landing of Marines from the 15th Marine Expeditionary Unit, which was supported by 2nd Battalion, 9th Marines. More than 15,000 metric tons of food was successfully distributed from 398 different food sites in the city during the operation. The final phase of the operation involved the transition from a U.S. peacemaking force to a United Nations peacekeeping force. U.S. Marine involvement in Operation Restore Hope officially ended on 27 April 1993, when the humanitarian relief sector of Mogadishu was handed over to Pakistani Armed Forces.

=== Iraq War ===
The 1st Marine Division, then under the command of Major General James Mattis, was one of the two major U.S. land forces that participated in the 2003 invasion of Iraq as the land component of the 1st Marine Expeditionary Force. In December 2002, Mattis was quoted as saying, "The President, the National Command Authority and the American people need speed. The sooner we get it over with the better. Our overriding principle will be speed, speed, speed." Initially, the division fought through the Rumaila oil fields, feinted an attack towards Basrah then moved north on Iraq Highway 1 to An Nasariyah – a moderate-sized, Shi'ite dominated city with important strategic significance as a major road junction and proximity to nearby Talil Airfield. The division then fought its way to Baghdad and pushed further to secure Tikrit by forming Task Force Tripoli after the fall of Baghdad. The division covered 808 kilometers in 17 days of sustained combat, the deepest penetrating ground operation in Marine Corps history. After the invasion the division settled in to conduct security and stabilization operations in Baghdad, Tikrit, and then in south-central Iraq from May to October 2003. For actions during the war as part of I MEF the division was awarded its 9th Presidential Unit Citation.

The division returned to Iraq in February 2004 and took control of the Al Anbar province in western Iraq; it was the lead unit in Operation Vigilant Resolve and Operation Phantom Fury in 2004. During February and March 2005, the division was relieved by the 2nd Marine Division concluding the largest relief in place in the history of the Marine Corps. In 2006, the division again deployed to Iraq as the ground combat element for I MEF in the Al Anbar province. It returned to MCB Camp Pendleton in early 2007.

=== War in Afghanistan ===
Battalions from the 1st Marine Division were regularly deployed to Afghanistan from 2008. In 2010, 1st Marine Division (Forward) deployed to the Helmand province campaign, as part of the more than 30,000 troops into the country. While in Afghanistan, the Division served as the ground combat element for Task Force Leatherneck, leading a multinational coalition and working alongside Afghan National Security Forces.

== Insignia ==
Originally termed a battle blaze, the shoulder sleeve insignia of the 1st Marine Division was designed by Lt. Col Merrill Twining, Division D-3 in February 1943 while the division was stationed in Victoria, Australia. The blue diamond with the Southern Cross is similar to the Flag of Victoria. The red numeral one in the middle denotes the division's first action on Guadalcanal. A commercial firm in Melbourne first produced the shoulder patch; each Marine was issued two, to be sewn onto his battle jacket.

The 2nd Marine Division originally had a similar battle blaze of the same design with a red snake in the shape of a "2" also reading GUADALCANAL.

Marine Corps shoulder sleeve insignia were officially authorized on 15 March 1943.

== Unit awards ==
A unit citation or commendation is an award bestowed upon an organization for the action cited. Members of the unit who participated in said actions are allowed to wear on their uniforms the awarded unit citation. The 1st Marine Division has been presented with the following awards:

| Streamer | Award | Year(s) | Additional Info |
|---|---|---|---|
| | Presidential Unit Citation Streamer with one Silver and three Bronze Stars | 1942, 1944, 1945, 1950, 1950, 1951, 1966–1967, 1967–1968, 2003 | Guadalcanal, Peleliu-Ngesebus, Okinawa, Korea, Vietnam, Iraq |
| | Joint Meritorious Unit Award Streamer | 1992–1993 | Somalia |
| | Navy Unit Commendation Streamer with one Bronze Star | 1952–1953, 1990–1991 | Korea, Southwest Asia |
| | Mexican Service Streamer | April–November 1914 | Vera Cruz |
| | Dominican Campaign Streamer | June–December 1916 | |
| | Haitian Campaign Streamer with one Bronze Star | August 1915 – August 1934 | |
| | Marine Corps Expeditionary Streamer | | |
| | World War I Victory Streamer with one Bronze Star | | |
| | American Defense Service Streamer with one Bronze Star | 1941 | World War II |
| | Asiatic-Pacific Campaign Streamer with one Silver and one Bronze Star | | Guadalcanal, Eastern New Guinea, New Britain, Peleliu, Okinawa |
| | World War II Victory Streamer | 1941–1945 | Pacific War |
| | Navy Occupation Service Streamer with "ASIA" | | |
| | China Service Streamer with one Bronze Star | September 1946 – June 1947 | North China |
| | National Defense Service Streamer with three Bronze Stars | 1950–1954, 1961–1974, 1990–1995, 2001–present | Korean War, Vietnam War, Gulf War, war on terrorism |
| | Korean Service Streamer with two Silver Stars | 1950–1953 | Inchon-Seoul, Chosin Reservoir, East-Central Front, Western Front |
| | Armed Forces Expeditionary Streamer | 1992–1993 | Somalia |
| | Vietnam Service Streamer with two Silver and three Bronze Stars | July 1965 – April 1971, April–December 1975 | Chu Lai, Da Nang, Dong Ha, Qui Nhon, Huế, Phu Bai, Quang Tri, Operation New Arrival |
| | Southwest Asia Service Streamer with two Bronze Stars | September 1990 – February 1991 | Desert Shield, Desert Storm |
| | Iraq Campaign Streamer | | March 2004 – March 2005, March 2006 – February 2007 |
| | Global War on Terrorism Expeditionary Streamer | | March–May 2003 |
| | Global War on Terrorism Service Streamer | 2001–present | |
| | Korea Presidential Unit Citation Streamer | | |
| | Vietnam Gallantry Cross with Palm Streamer | | |
| | Vietnam Meritorious Unit Citation Civil Actions Streamer | | |

== See also ==
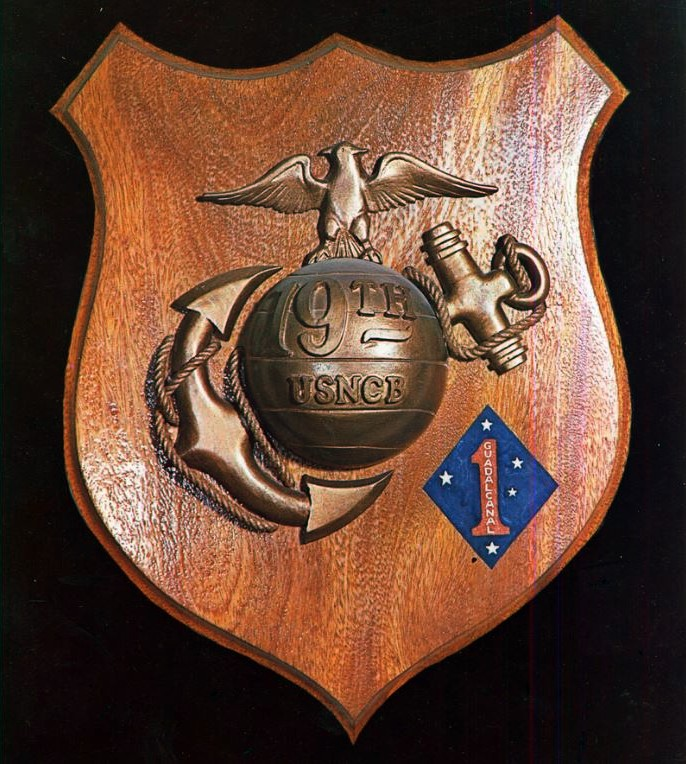
19th Naval Construction Battalion Plaque as the third Battalion 17th Marines with the 1st Marine Division Seabee Museum Archives

- History of the United States Marine Corps
- List of 1st Marine Division Commanders
- List of United States Marine Corps divisions
- Organization of the United States Marine Corps
- 17th Marine Regiment 19th Naval Construction Battalion
- With the Old Breed
- The Pacific (miniseries)
- Generation Kill
