= Operation Mameluke Thrust =

1968 military operation in the Vietnam War

- Part of the Vietnam War
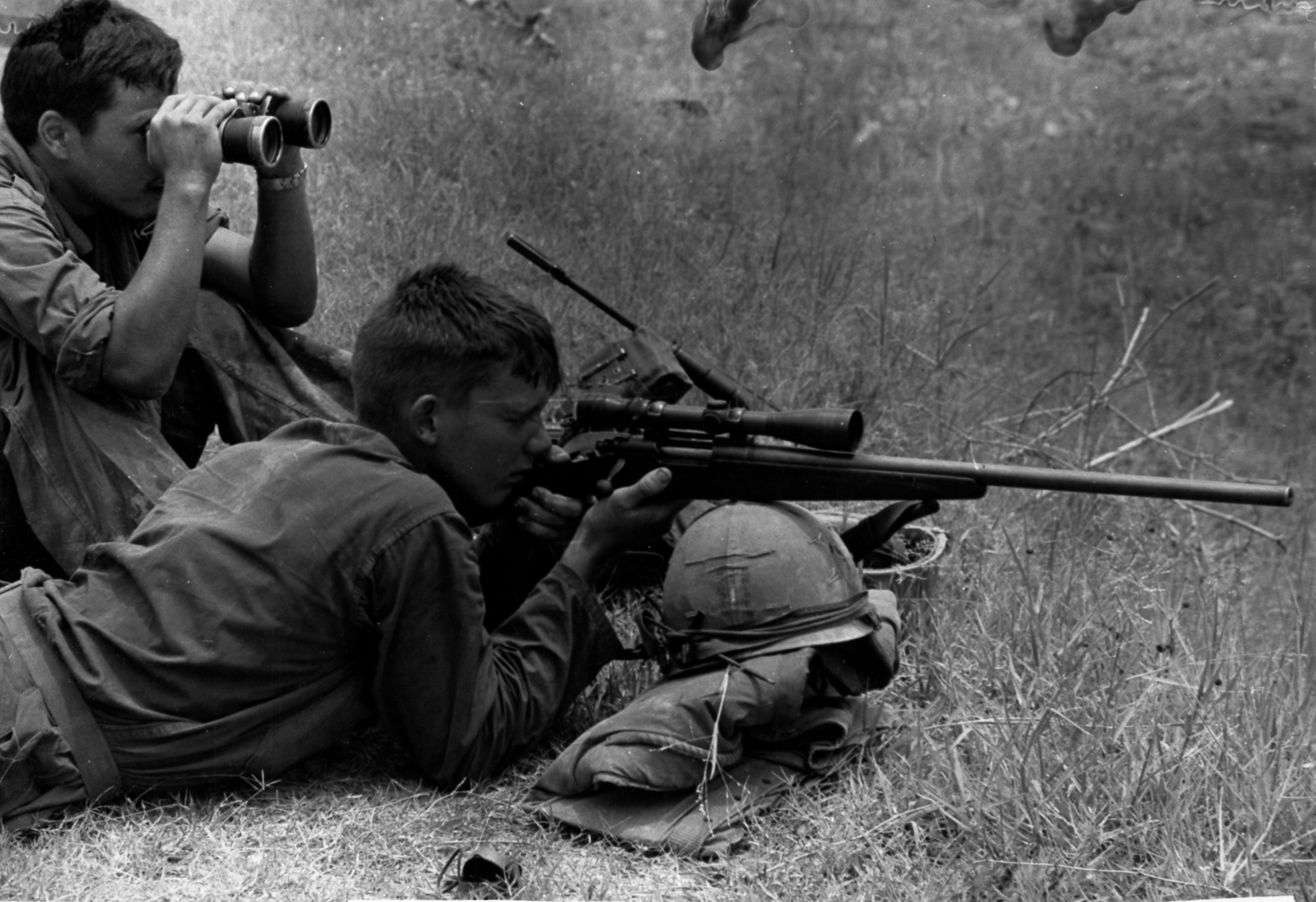
- Seventh Marine Regiment sniper team during Operation Mameluke Thrust
Date	19 May – 23 October 1968
Location	Happy Valley, Quảng Nam Province, South Vietnam 15.85°N 108.2°E

Belligerents
United States	North Vietnam

Commanders and leaders
MG Donn J. Robertson; MG Carl A. Youngdale	

Units involved
1st Marine Division: 7th Marine Regiment; 3rd Battalion 5th Marines; 26th Marine Regiment; 9th Cavalry Regiment: A Troop, 1st Squadron	308th Division: 36th Regiment

Casualties and losses
269 killed	Per US body count: 2,728 killed 47 captured

Operation Mameluke Thrust was a US Marine Corps operation that took place in Happy Valley southwest of Danang, lasting from 19 May to 23 October 1968.

== Background ==
On 9 May the 1st Marine Division commander MG Donn J. Robertson was ordered to conduct a spoiling attack into the valleys west of Danang and around Thường Ðức Camp. The loss of Kham Duc on 12 May raised the concern that the People's Army of Vietnam (PAVN) would next seek to overrun Thường Ðức. PAVN units in the area were believed to include the 31st Regiment, 341st Division and the 368B Rocket Regiment.

== Operation ==
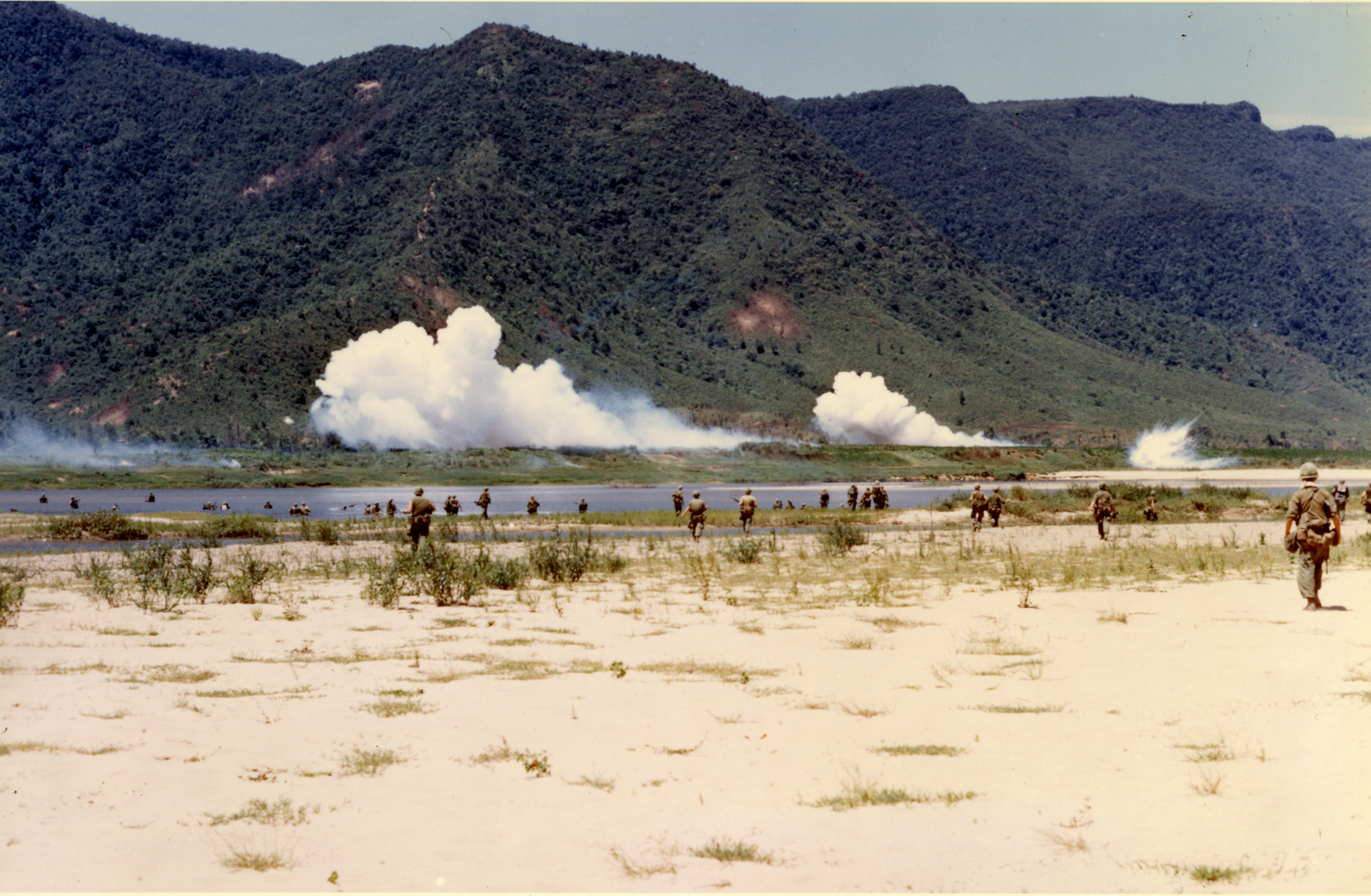
D Company, 1st Battalion 7th Marines crossing a river

On 19 May the 1st Battalion 7th Marines attacked west from Danang along the Vu Gia River towards Thường Ðức, while the 3rd Battalion 26th Marines attacked into Happy Valley. By the end of May both units had discovered PAVN base areas but had minimal contact.

On 3 June the area of operations was expanded east into the "Arizona Territory" near the An Hoa Combat Base and the 1st Battalion, 26th Marines was added to the operation.

At 07:30 on 7 June while moving south of the Liberty Bridge (15.856°N 108.192°E) Company B 1/26 Marine came under fire from a PAVN force dug in on a low hill, the battle continued for 9 hours until the PAVN retreated. Marine losses were 17 dead and 46 wounded while PAVN losses were 64 dead.

On 9 June Company L 3/26 Marines discovered a recently abandoned 125 bed PAVN field hospital. On 11 June Company I 3/26 Marines discovered the headquarters of the PAVN 368B Rocket Regiment and large quantities of rockets and targeting equipment.

On 13 June near the village of Ky Chau 1/26 Marines cornered a PAVN force against the Song Ky Lam and a Republic of Korea Marines force. The 9 hours long battle resulted in 3 Marines killed and 24 wounded while the PAVN lost 44 killed. That night Company B 1/26 Marines ambushed a retreating PAVN unit killing 13 for no Marine losses.

On 14 June 3rd Battalion 5th Marines deployed from the An Hoa Combat Base into the Arizona Territory. As Company I advanced it was hit by PAVN mortar fire which killed most of the command, the Company Executive Officer 1LT Joseph Campbell though seriously wounded himself took command and arranged for defensive fire and medevac helicopters before dying of his wounds.

On 15 June southeast of Hill 55 1/26 Marines located and overran a PAVN bunker system killing 84 PAVN for the loss of 7 Marines.

The operation continued throughout June and July with minimal contact and it appeared that the PAVN had abandoned the area. On 28 July a Marine Stingray patrol spotted 4 PT-76 light tanks 3.5 km northwest of An Hoa Combat Base, artillery and airstrikes were called in and 4 secondary explosions were seen. An agent reported that 2 PT-76s had been destroyed but no wreckage was located.

At 04:00 on 1 August a PAVN force attacked a Marine Stingray patrol in the Arizona Territory killing 5 Marines and wounding 11 for the loss of 3 PAVN.

From 1–2 August A Troop, 1st Squadron, 9th Cavalry under the operational control of the 5th Marine Regiment killed 96 PAVN in the Arizona Territory.

On 6 June Companies E and F 5th Marines engaged a PAVN Company near the village of Cu Ban overrunning the position and killing 23 PAVN for the loss of 1 Marine.

On the morning of 17 August 3/5 Marines and BLT 2nd Battalion 7th Marines attacked a suspected PAVN base near Chau Phong southeast of the Liberty Bridge killing 53 PAVN for no losses. The following morning the Marines engaged more PAVN units near Chau Phong resulting in 13 Marines killed and 49 PAVN killed.

On 29 August a PAVN Platoon ambushed Company D 1st Battalion 5th Marines killing 12 Marines and wounding 18 while the PAVN lost 25 dead.

On 14 September Company L, 3rd Battalion 7th Marines was ambushed 4 km south of Hill 55 resulting in 1 dead and 4 missing. The following day the bodies of the missing Marines were recovered and 72 bunkers were destroyed in the ambush area.

On 18 September BLT 2/7 Marines were deployed onto Route 4. The following morning as the Marines patrolled west they were hit by fire from entrenched PAVN positions. The battle continued all day and 2 Companies from 3/7 Marine were helicoptered in to support the assault. Marine losses for the day were 14 dead and 54 wounded. On the morning of 20 September the Marines overran the position finding only 3 dead PAVN from the 2nd Battalion, 36th Regiment. Company G 2/7 Marines then encountered a PAVN force near Nong Son (2) losing 5 dead and 19 wounded before withdrawing to allow supporting fire to engage the PAVN. On 21 September the Marines overran the PAVN bunkers which turn out to be the command post of the 36th Regiment, PAVN losses were 69 killed.

== Aftermath ==
Operation Mameluke Thrust concluded on 23 October, the Marines had suffered 269 dead and 1,730 wounded while the PAVN had 2,730 killed and 47 captured. Operation Henderson Hill began immediately in the same area of operations.
