= Operation Maui Peak =

Part of the Vietnam War (1968)

- Part of the Vietnam War
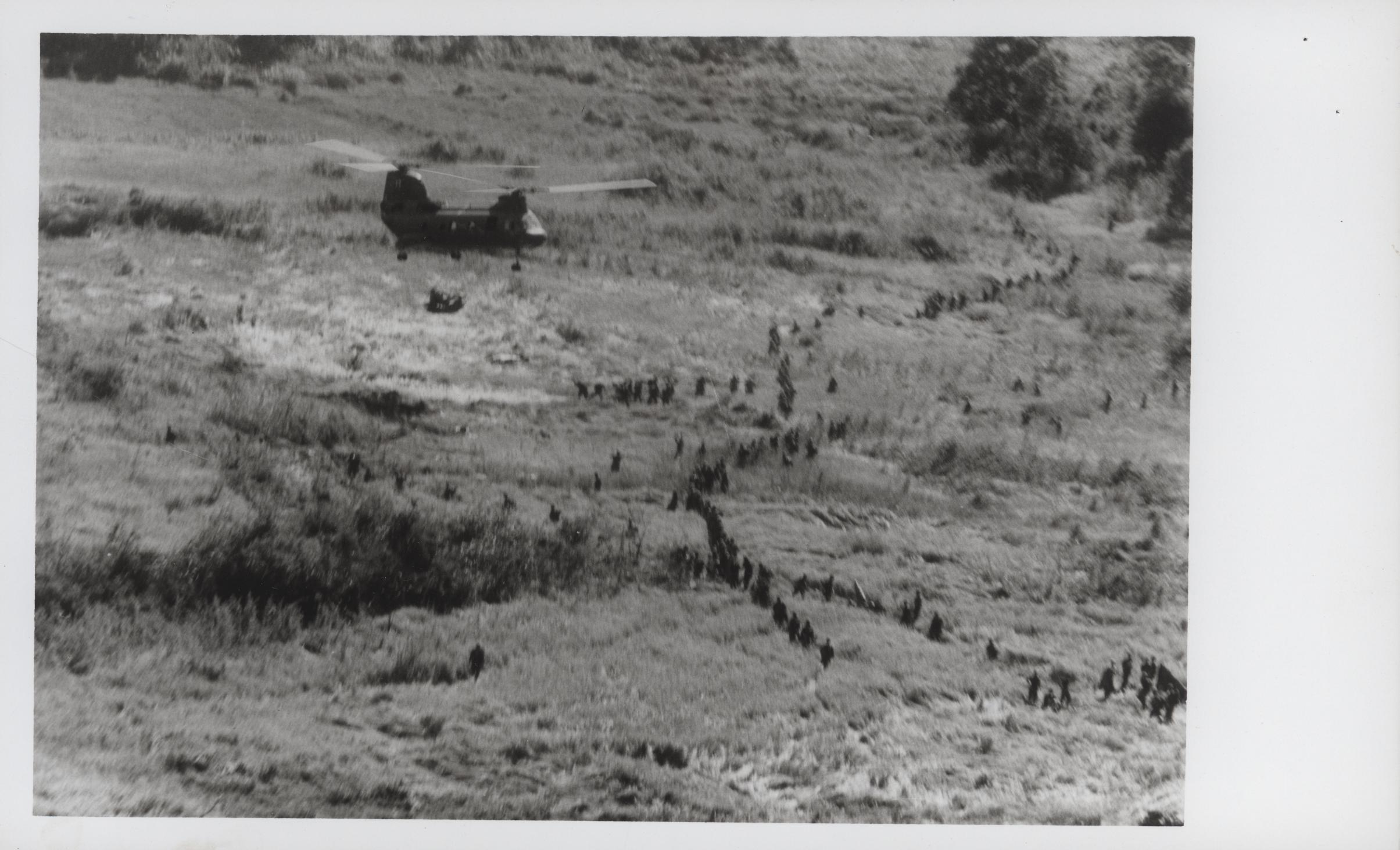
- MAG-16 CH-46 lands supplies
Date	1–19 October 1968
Location	Thường Ðức Camp, Quảng Nam Province, South Vietnam 15.84°N 107.931°E
Result	U.S. victory

Belligerents
United States	North Vietnam

Commanders and leaders
MG Carl A. Youngdale; COL Herbert Beckington	

Units involved
1st Marine Division 1st Battalion, 1st Marines; 2nd Battalion, 5th Marines; 3rd Battalion, 5th Marines; 2nd Battalion, 7th Marines	2nd Division; 21st Regiment; 141st Regiment; 368B Rocket Regiment

Casualties and losses
28 killed	US body count: 202 killed

Operation Maui Peak was a US Marine Corps operation that took place near the Thường Ðức Camp southwest of Danang, during the Vietnam War. It lasted from 1 to 19 October 1968.

== Background ==
In late September 1968 1st Marine Division intelligence detected the presence of the People's Army of Vietnam (PAVN) 21st Regiment, 2nd Division, 141st Regiment and the 368B Rocket Regiment near the Thường Ðức Camp. In an early morning attack on 28 September the PAVN overran two of the Camp's outposts. As bad weather made tactical air support impossible a Marine tactical air control group flew into the camp with a radar beacon which was used to guide Marine A-6s to make precision bombing attacks on the PAVN positions forcing them to abandon them on 29 September.

The 7th Marine Regiment supported by the 2nd Battalion, 5th Marines and 3rd Battalion, 5th Marines were tasked with relieving the siege around Thường Ðức.

== Operation ==
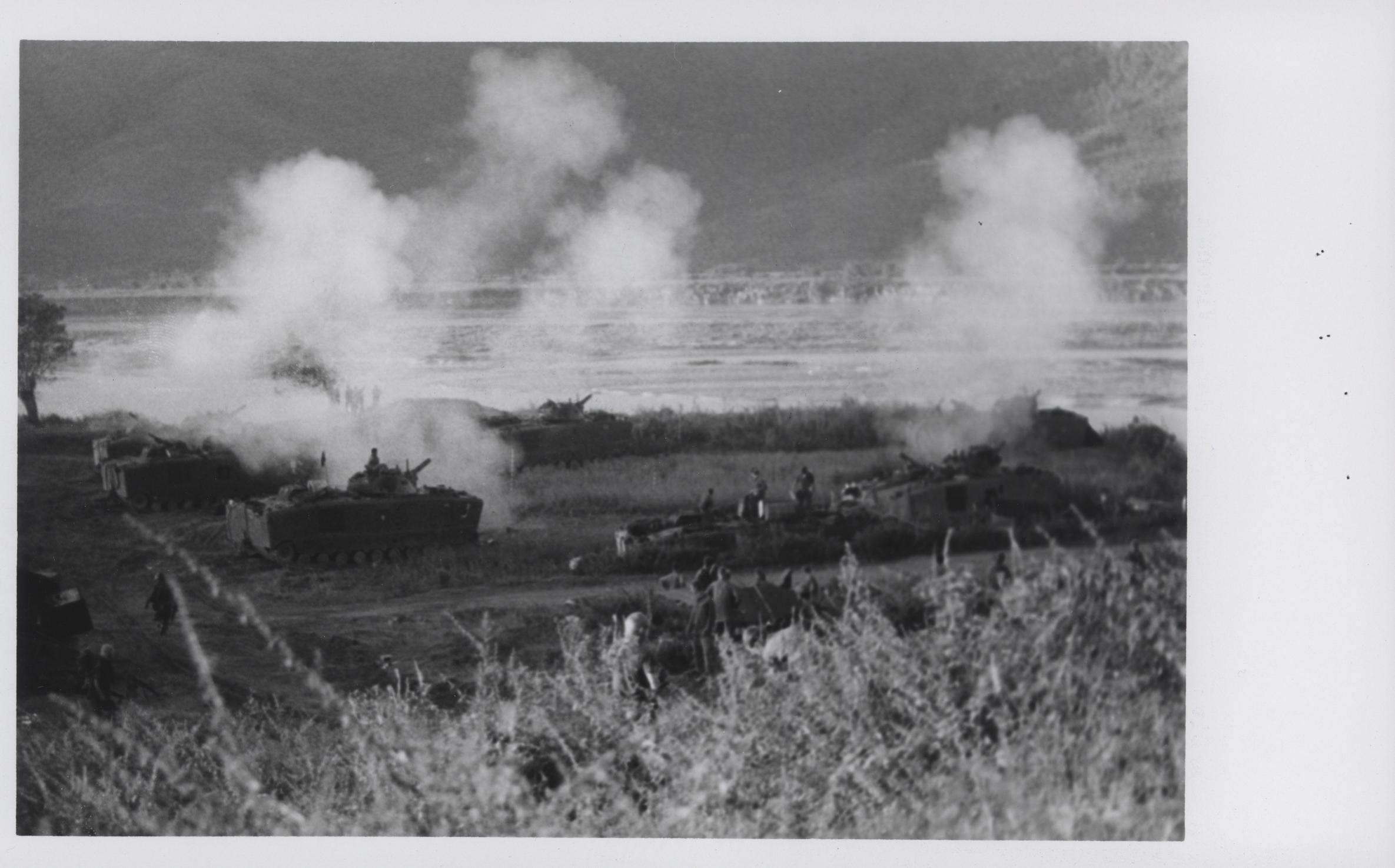
Marine LVTH-6s fire their 105mm guns

On 6 October B-52s and tactical aircraft began bombing the intended landing zones in the hills around Thường Ðức while the 2/5 Marines moved west along Route 4 towards the Camp. As they advanced the Marines were engaged by the PAVN 1st Battalion, 141st Regiment in a battle that lasted all day.

At 07:30 the helicopters carrying the 3/5 Marines approaching Landing Zone Sparrow 4 km south of Thường Ðức were met with intense antiaircraft fire forcing the helicopters to return to An Hoa Combat Base. At 11:00 BLT 2nd Battalion, 7th Marines was landed at Landing Zone Vulture and two ARVN Battalions were landed at Landing Zone Hawk 7 km northwest of Thường Ðức. Two Companies from 2/7 Marines began traversing the hills towards Thường Ðức. At 17:40 3/5 Marines were landed at Landing Zone Kiwi southeast of Thường Ðức.

On 7 October the Marine units began to close in on Thường Ðức. Landing Zone Sparrow was hit again by tactical aircraft dropping 750 lb and fuel-air bombs in preparation for a landing by the 1st Battalion, 1st Marines however as the helicopters approached at 09:10 they were once again forced back by intense anti-aircraft fire.

On Route 4 2/5 Marines encountered another well entrenched PAVN position 200m west of the site of the previous day's battle and were forced to withdraw with 12 wounded.

On the afternoon of 8 October after artillery and airstrikes, 2/5 Marines renewed their attack supported by 4 M-48 tanks quickly overrunning the PAVN position and killing 37 PAVN for 1 Marine killed.

At 04:00 on 12 October following a preparatory mortar attack the PAVN attacked the 2/5 Marines on Route 4. The Marines called in extensive artillery and gunship support killing 46 PAVN and capturing 1 for the loss of 8 marines killed

On 14 October Company F 2/7 Marines arrived at Thường Ðức officially ending the siege.

== Aftermath ==
By the time Operation Maui Peak concluded on 19 October, the Marines had suffered 28 dead and 143 wounded and claimed that the PAVN had suffered 202 killed.
