= Battle of Thượng Đức (1968) =

Part of the Vietnam War (1968)

Battle of Thượng Ðức (1968)
- Part of the Vietnam War
Date	28–30 September 1968
Location	15.852°N 107.948°E; Quảng Nam Province, South Vietnam
Result	Allied victory

Belligerents
South Vietnam; United States	North Vietnam

Strength
(South Vietnam) Civilian Irregular Defense Group (United States) 5th Special Forces Group Detachment A-109	2nd Division; 21st Regiment; 141st Regiment; 368B Rocket Regiment

Casualties and losses
(United States) 28 killed	70+

The Battle of Thượng Ðức took place during the Vietnam War where North Vietnamese forces attempted to overrun the Civilian Irregular Defense Group (CIDG) Thường Ðức Camp between 28 and 30 September 1968.

== Battle ==
One month after the Battle of Duc Lap the People's Army of Vietnam (PAVN) began a similar attempt to overrun Thường Ðức Camp southwest of Da Nang in Quảng Nam Province, central Vietnam. The camp came under attack in the early morning darkness of 28 September, with the PAVN overrunning the outposts manned by CIDG troops, firing into the camp itself, and seizing the airfield and most of the nearby village. The battle remained deadlocked until 13:00, when a forward air controller (FAC) directed four sorties against the captured outposts, in preparation for a successful counterattack. The force that advanced from the main camp found grisly proof of the effectiveness of the air strikes. Scattered about one outpost were parts of 8-10 PAVN bodies, while similar remains indicated that about 20 PAVN died at another. By dusk, some 40 fighter-bombers had hit targets in PAVN-held territory. Night found the PAVN in control of most of the high ground around the camp. To help keep the PAVN at bay, a Marine airborne controller flying an airplane fitted with a radar transponder established an aerial checkpoint over the battlefield. Marine A–6 Intruders, normally flown on night-time armed reconnaissance missions over Laos or southern North Vietnam, homed on this beacon and then followed instructions from Marine radar operators on the ground to bomb the PAVN without endangering friendly forces. Along with the Marine A–6s, United States Air Force (USAF) AC-47 Spooky gunships also took part in the nighttime defense of Thuong Duc. Air strikes proved essential in expelling the PAVN holding out in the village, fighting from new concrete-walled houses, many of them built by the families of Thuong Duc's defenders.

On 28 September, after the South Vietnamese district chief reported that all noncombatants had departed, a CIDG force attacked the village, but became pinned down in the marketplace because their supporting 106-mm recoilless rifles could not penetrate the sturdy buildings nearby. A 5th Special Forces Group Detachment A-109 officer called for air strikes that annihilated both the structures and the troops that had fortified them. In the vicinity of the marketplace, the advancing CIDGs found 40 to 50 bodies, with other corpses half-buried in collapsed trenches or houses. Shortly afterward, a FAC called in F–4 Phantoms against a suspected mortar position across a river from the camp. Dust from the first rounds had barely settled when yellow smoke billowed upward, a signal sometimes used to indicate the presence of friendly troops. The ruse failed, however, since the FAC had received word that neither Americans nor South Vietnamese had crossed the stream. Fighter-bombers repeatedly swept low over the target, and frantic messages crackled over a captured PAVN radio being monitored by members of the Thuong Duc Special Forces detachment. The radio traffic indicated that American bombs had fallen squarely upon a PAVN unit, wounding a high-ranking officer and causing momentary panic. The struggle for Thuong Duc lasted until the morning of 30 September, when a MIKE Force, landed from Army helicopters the previous day, helped drive off the PAVN. The aerial firepower unleashed near the camp had proved overwhelming. Besides the night-time activity of the slowly circling AC–47s and the more modern AC–130A, the PAVN had to contend each night with as many as ten radar-directed A–6 strikes. In addition, B–52s bombed suspected troop concentrations some distance from the battlefield.

== Aftermath ==
On 6 October a combined U.S. Marine-South Vietnamese operation, Operation Maui Peak was launched to clear the hills around the base. The forces involved included the 1st Battalion, 1st Marines, 2nd Battalion, 5th Marines, 3rd Battalion, 5th Marines, 2nd Battalion, 7th Marines and 3rd Battalion, 7th Marines and resulted in an estimated 353 PAVN killed for the loss of 28 Marines.
