= Operation Macon =

Part of the Vietnam War (1966)

- Part of the Vietnam War
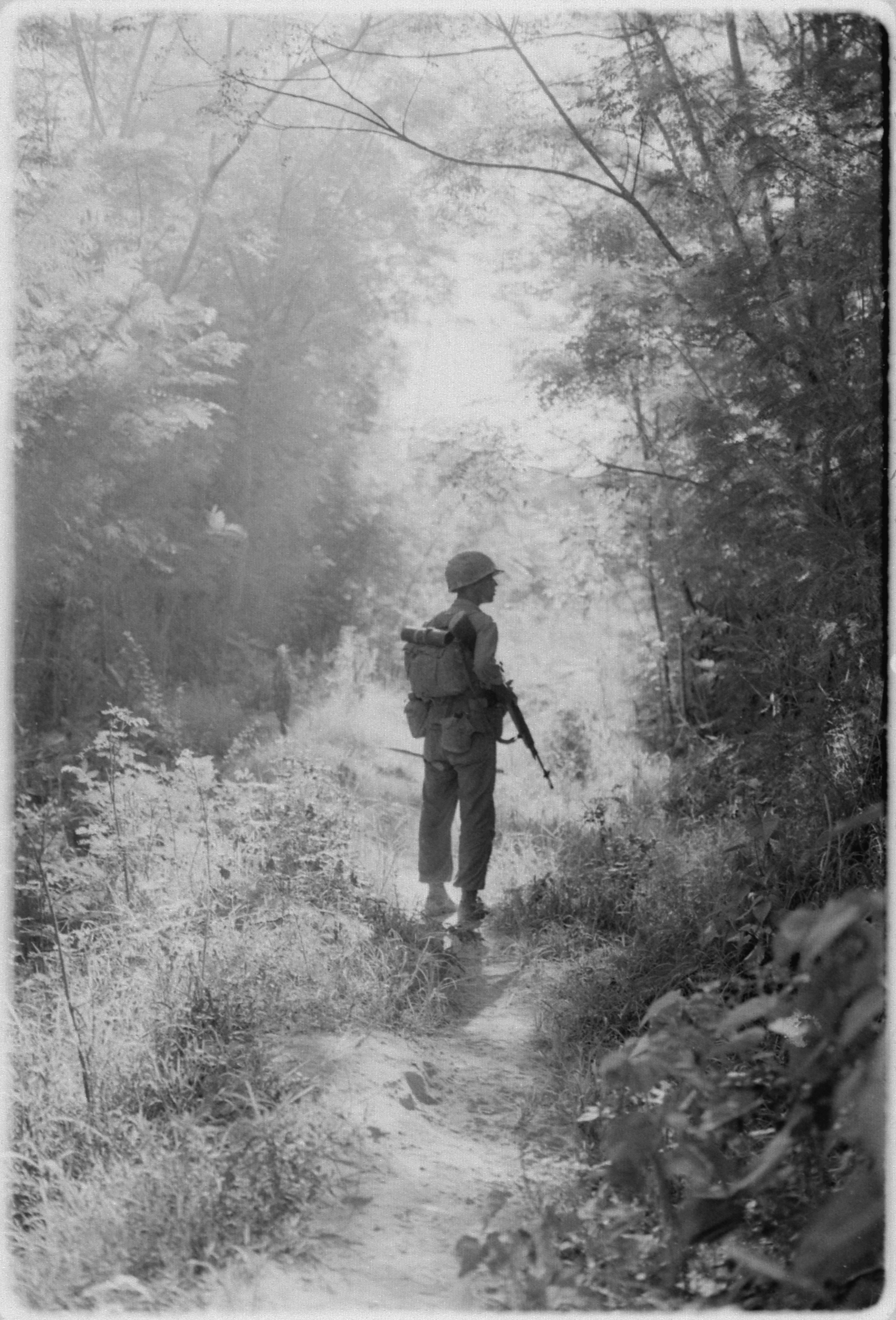
- A Marine on patrol during Operation Macon
Date	4 July – 28 October 1966
Location	western Quảng Nam Province, South Vietnam 15.785°N 108.073°E
Result	U.S. claims operational success

Belligerents
United States	Viet Cong

Commanders and leaders
Col. Drew J. Barrett; Maj. George H. Grimes	

Units involved
3rd Battalion, 9th Marines; 1st Battalion, 3rd Marines; 3rd Battalion, 3rd Marines	R-20 Battalion

Casualties and losses
24 killed	380 killed

Operation Macon was a US Marine Corps search and destroy operation in western Quảng Nam Province, lasting from 4 July to 28 October 1966.

== Prelude ==
Following the conclusion of Operation Georgia on 10 May, the 3rd Battalion, 9th Marines remained at An Hoa Combat Base to provide security for the An Hoa Industrial Complex. On 1 July a squad leader from the Viet Cong (VC) 1st Company, R-20 Doc Lap Battalion, surrendered to Marine forces and revealed that his unit was located south of the Thu Bồn River and east of An Hoa Base where they were preparing defenses to engage any Marine forces that might enter the area. Further intelligence indicated that the VC were armed with heavy weapons including 5 12.7mm machine guns, 3 81mm mortars and 57mm recoilless rifles. Aerial reconnaissance by VMO-2 confirmed that the VC were entrenched south of the Thu Bồn.

On 4 July two companies of the R-20 Battalion moved west towards the Thu Bồn and established ambush positions around the hamlets of My Loc (3) and My Loc (4) threatening the road link to An Hoa Base. At 15:20 Company K, 3/9 Marines operating with LVTHs triggered the ambush with one LVTH being knocked out and its commander killed. The 3/9 Marines commander, Maj. George H. Grimes, ordered Company I to move to support Company K's left flank and for helicopter to lift Company L from An Hoa Base to Hill 42, 2 km south of My Loc (4). As Company I approached the site it was met by heavy VC fire and Company K was unable to disengage or call in artillery support because the VC were too close to their position. At 17:30 Company I linked up with Company K and the VC began to disengage and 200–250 VC were observed moving northwest. Air and artillery strikes were called in on the retreating VC and estimates of the dead ranged from 12 to 62 killed. Companies I and K established a night defensive position and were harassed by mortar fire throughout the night. At dawn on 5 July they began a sweep of the area. At 08:40 VC fire killed a Company K Marine and artillery strikes were called in resulting in 12 VC killed. By dusk on 5 July a total of 17 VC had been killed.

On the afternoon of 5 July III Marine Amphibious Force commander MG Lew Walt saw the opportunity to destroy the R-20 Battalion and ordered a multi-battalion operation in the An Hoa area, commencing on 4 July.

== Operation ==
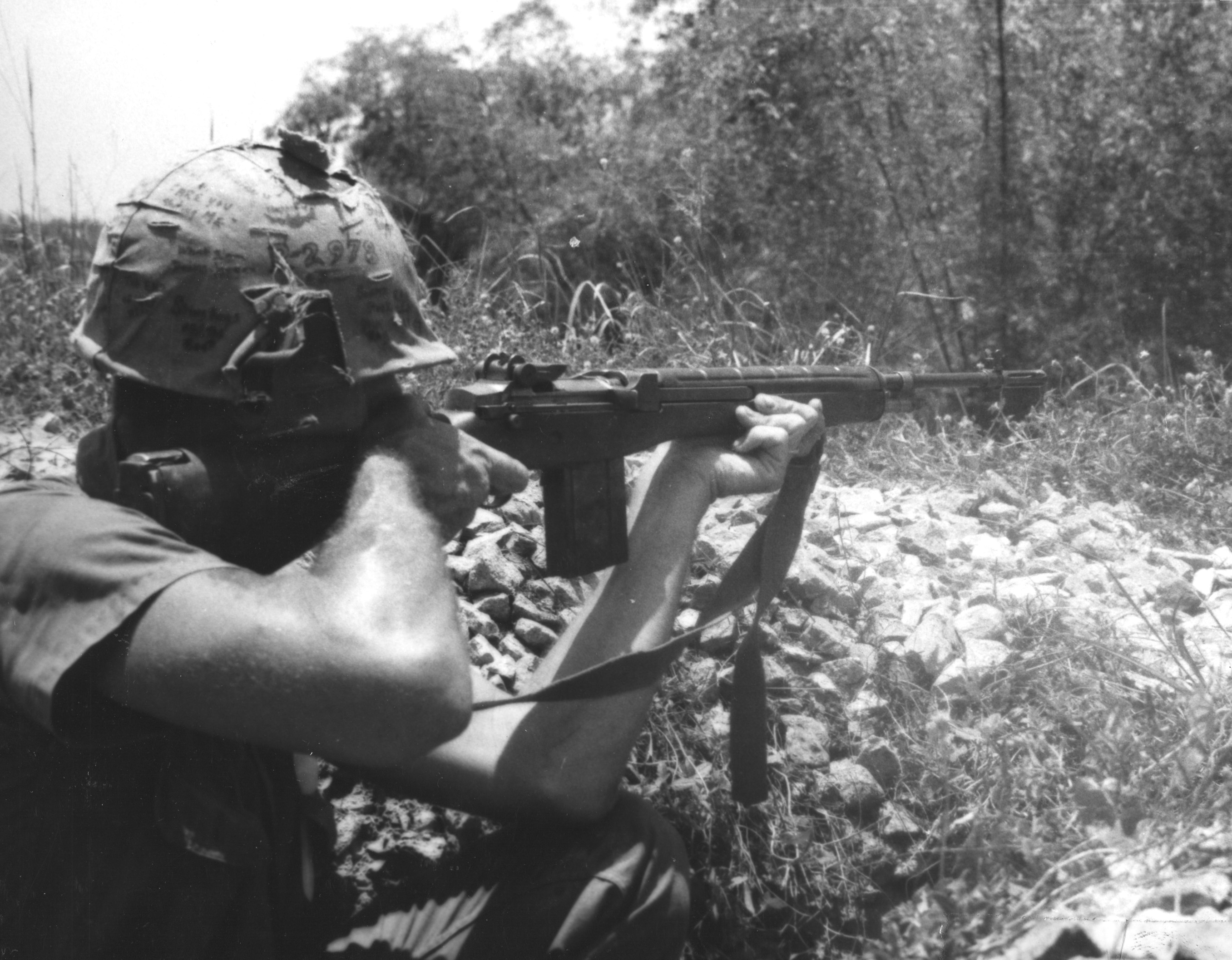
Company I, 3/3 Marines rifleman fires his M-14 at Vietcong

At 10:00 on 6 July, following preparatory artillery bombardment by the 12th Marine Regiment, CH-46s from HMM-164 and HMM-265 began landing the 1st Battalion, 3rd Marines at Landing Zone Dixie, 1.5 km south of the Ky Lam River. At 11:00 HMM-164 and HMM-265 began landing the 3rd Battalion, 3rd Marines at Landing Zone Savannah, 4 km southwest of LZ Dixie to establish block positions. Once the 2 Battalions were in position, 3/9 Marines began moving northwest towards them supported by LVTHs and tanks. By 10 July the 3/9 Marines had linked up with the 3/3 Marines at LZ Savannah, the VC had offered minimal resistance losing 87 killed for the loss of 8 Marines killed.

On 11 July 1/3 Marines reinforced by a company from 3/3 Marines and Company K, 3/9 Marines was ordered to advance east with the Army of the Republic of Vietnam (ARVN) 51st Regiment, while rest of 3/9 Marines were to move southwest back towards the 4 July ambush position. At 02:50 on 12 July the VC mortared the 3/9 Marines night defensive position with no effect. On 13 July 1/3 Marines completed its eastward sweep without encountering any VC. It appeared that the VC had left the area and the operation was to conclude on the morning of 14 July.

On the morning of 14 July a Marine patrol 11 km east of An Hoa Base observed a 3-400 strong VC unit and called in air and artillery strikes on them, killing at least 30. Given the continued VC presence around An Hoa, the operation was ordered to continue indefinitely.

The Marines engaged few VC throughout the rest of July and August although patrols continued to search the area and the Marines provided security for the upgrade of the road from An Hoa, across the Thu Bồn River to join up with Route 4, named Liberty Road. On 24 August the first road convoy from Da Nang along the Liberty Road arrived at An Hoa.

At midday on 3 September, Company I, 3/9 Marines engaged a VC company in the hamlet of Cu Ban (1) on the Thu Bồn River, losing 5 Marines killed, while killing 32 VC in a 2-hour long firefight.

On 5 September Company K, 3/9 Marines and the ARVN 3rd Company, 2nd Battalion, 51st Regiment were moving west along Route 537, 2 km southeast of the 3 September engagement when the ARVN unit was ambushed by VC. Company K was unable to moved forward to assist the ARVN and Company I which was operating southeast of the ambush site was ordered to assist them in a pincer movement. On approaching the ambush site, a VC recoilless rifle knocked out an M50 Ontos supporting Company I and the Company was soon heavily engaged. Air and artillery strikes were called in, but the VC resisted fiercely and the two groups were unable to link up until dusk. The VC withdrew overnight leaving 29 dead, while the Marines had lost 3 dead.

The rest of September and October saw little action in the Macon area of operations apart from attacks by fire, mines and booby-traps as the VC generally avoided contact.

== Aftermath ==
Operation Macon concluded on 28 October, the Marines had lost 24 killed and they claimed 380 VC killed.
