= 341st Division =

341st Division may refer to:

- 341st Rifle Division, Soviet Union
- 341st Division (Vietnam)

== See also ==
- List of military divisions by number
