= Operation Henderson Hill =

Part of the Vietnam War (1968)

- Part of Vietnam War
Date	23 October – 6 December 1968
Location	Happy Valley, Quảng Nam Province, South Vietnam 15.85°N 108.2°E
Result	US operational success

Belligerents
United States	North Vietnam; Viet Cong

Commanders and leaders
MG Carl A. Youngdale	

Units involved
5th Marine Regiment	90th Regiment

Casualties and losses
35 killed	US body count: 700 killed 94 captured 41 individual and 5 crew-served weapons recovered

Operation Henderson Hill was a US Marine Corps operation that took place in Happy Valley southwest of Danang, lasting from 23 October to 6 December 1968.

== Background ==
On 23 October Marine intelligence detected that the People’s Army of Vietnam (PAVN) 90th Regiment had moved into the Arizona Territory and the 5th Marine Regiment was ordered to the area to investigate.

== Operation ==
After small arms fire prevented their landing at the primary landing zone the 2nd Battalion, 5th Marines were successfully landed by nightfall on 23 October without opposition. The 2nd and 3rd Battalion, 5th Marines searched the area without making contact with any PAVN but did discover a 24-page “Winter-Spring 1968-9 Campaign” strategy document. The operation was then expanded into the An Hoa and Go Noi Island (located approximately 25 km south of Danang to the west of Highway 1) sectors in November.

The 5th Marines surrounded the PAVN 1st Battalion, 36th Regiment at Chau Phong but the PAVN attempted to escape rather than fight.

On 27 October a unit of the 5th Regiment observed 15 PAVN moving 5 miles (8.0 km) northeast of An Hoa and called in artillery fire and airstrikes on them killing 14. On 31 October 2 groups totalling 60-75 PAVN were observed 6 miles (9.7 km) east northeast of An Hoa and the Marines attacked them with mortar and small arms fire killing 13 before the remainder withdrew.

On 1 November between 11:00 and 17:00, elements of the 5th Regiment engaged several small groups of PAVN 6 miles east northeast of An Hoa killing 15. Between 14:30 and 15:30 other Regiment units engaged PAVN 8 miles (13 km) east northeast of An Hoa killing 18 and capturing 5 and 5 individual and 1 crew-served weapons for Marine losses of 7 killed.

On 4 November at 14:30 a Marine recon platoon observed 24 PAVN moving 2 miles (3.2 km) northwest of An Hoa and called in artillery fire resulting in 8 PAVN killed. On 5 November at 09:30 a Marine unit engaged a PAVN force 9 miles (14 km) northeast of An Hoa killing 3 and capturing 2 together with 3 weapons for Marine loss of 1 killed. The same day Marines found a 5-ton rice cache 9 miles east northeast of An Hoa.

On 7 November at 06:45 12 PAVN were engaged 5 mi northeast of An Hoa killing 8. Later that day another 12 PAVN were engaged 6 mi northeast of An Hoa, 5 were killed. On 8 November a Marine recon team observed 35 PAVN moving 3 miles (4.8 km) northwest of An Hoa and called in artillery fire on them killing 19. On 11 November a Marine recon team observed 47 PAVN 3 miles northwest of An Hoa and called in artillery fire on them killing 16. On 13 November a Chieu Hoi led Marines to a 57-ton rice cache.

On 18 November at 09:15 a Marine recon team observed 80 PAVN 2 miles northwest of An Hoa and called in artillery fire on them killing 20 and causing 5 secondary explosions. At 15:20 another recon team observed 75 PAVN 3 miles northwest of An Hoa and called in artillery fire on them killing 28 and causing 3 secondary explosions. On 19 November at 14:30 a Marine recon team observed 55 PAVN 2 miles west northwest of An Hoa and called in artillery fire on them killing 33. Approximately 2 hours later in the same area the recon team observed 35 PAVN and called in artillery fire on them killing 23.

On 20 November at 14:00 a Marine recon team observed 30 PAVN 6 miles southeast of An Hoa and engaged them with small arms killing 11 and capturing 1 weapon before the PAVN withdrew. At 16:00 a Marine recon team observed 24 PAVN digging foxholes 2 miles west northwest of An Hoa and called in artillery fire on them killing 5 and causing 2 secondary explosions. At 17:50 in the same area the team observed 35 PAVN moving southeast and called in artillery fire on them killing 10. On 21 November in two sighting by Marine recon teams 36 PAVN were seen 3–6 miles northwest of An Hoa and were engaged by artillery fire killing 11. On 24 November a Marine recon team observed 60 PAVN/Viet Cong (VC) 3 miles north northwest of An Hoa and called in artillery fire on them killing 20. On 29 November a Marine recon team observed 22 PAVN 3 miles north northwest of An Hoa and called in artillery fire on them killing 12.

On 5 December at 18:30 a Marine recon team observed 10 PAVN 6 miles north of An Hoa and called in artillery fire on them killing 8. At 19:00 a Marine recon team observed 15 sampans carrying 26 VC 6 miles north of An Hoa and called in artillery fire on them sinking 4 sampans and killing 16 VC. At 20:45 another Marine recon team observed 7 PAVN 7 miles (11 km) north of An Hoa and directed artillery fire on them killing 8.

== Aftermath ==
The operation concluded on 6 December. PAVN/VC losses were 700 killed and 94 captured and 41 individual and 5 crew-served weapons captured for Marine losses of 35 killed.
