= Operation Essex =

Part of the Vietnam War (1967)

- Part of the Vietnam War
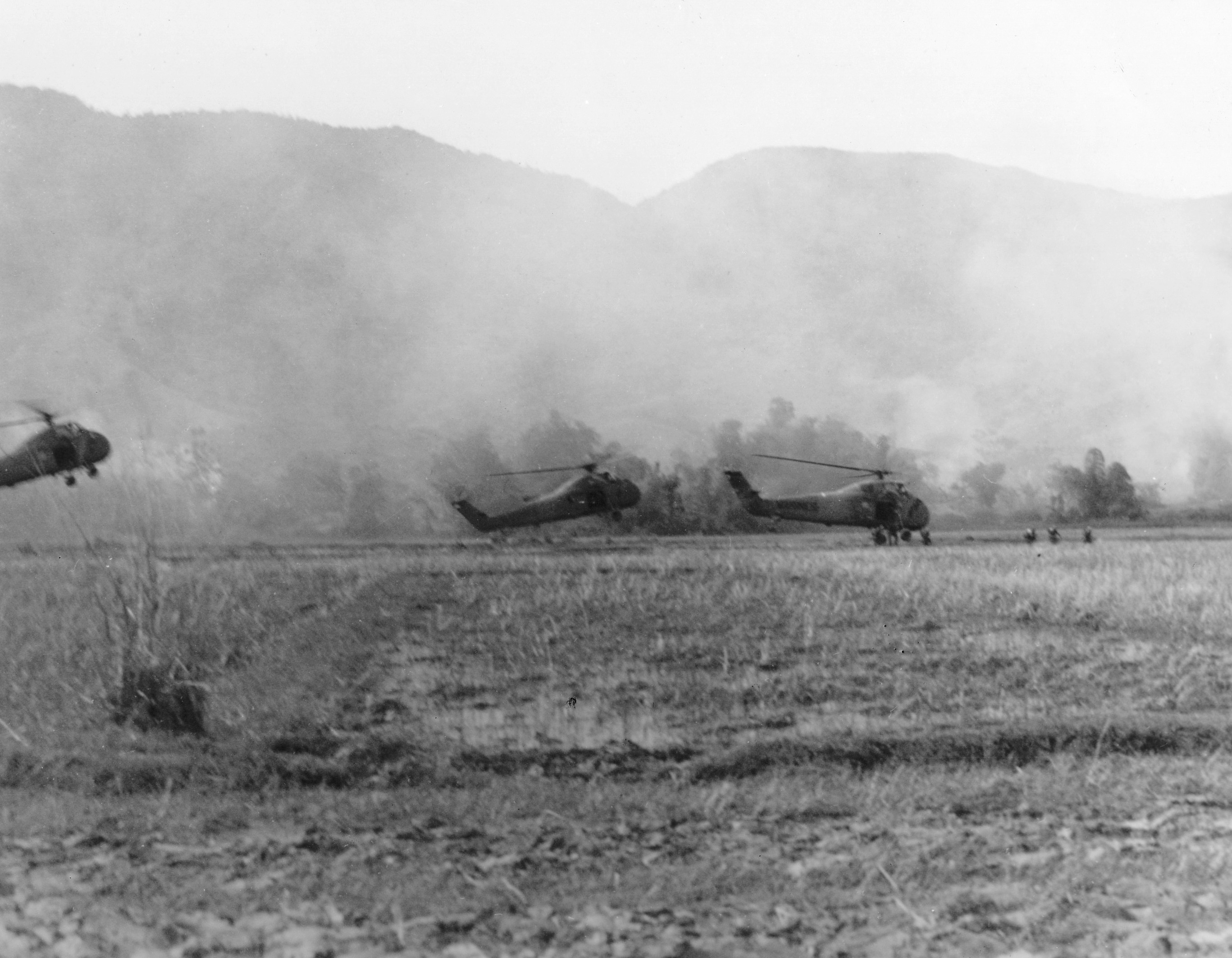
- Marine helicopters land during Operation Essex
Date	6–17 November 1967
Location	Hiệp Đức District, Quảng Nam Province South Vietnam

Belligerents
United States	North Vietnam

Commanders and leaders
Lt. Col. George C. McNaughton	Unknown

Units involved
2nd Battalion, 5th Marines	1 Battalion

Casualties and losses
16 killed	60+ estimated killed

Operation Essex was an operation by the 2nd Battalion, 5th Marines in "Antenna Valley", Hiệp Đức District south of An Hoa Combat Base from 6 to 17 November 1967.

== Background ==
Essex was planned as a continuation of Operation Swift designed to push People's Army of Vietnam (PAVN) and Viet Cong (VC) units operating in the area into US Army units conducting Operation Wheeler/Wallowa in the Hiệp Đức District-Quế Sơn Valley.

== Operation ==
On the morning of 6 November 2/5 Marines was landed by helicopter in Antenna Valley. Company H was proceeding towards its objective, the village of Ap Bon 2 in the northeast of the valley when it was ambushed by an entrenched PAVN unit. The Company commander ordered his 2nd platoon to outflank the PAVN ambush but they were also ambushed west of the village losing 2 Marines killed and withdrew back to the Company position. Air and artillery strikes were called in and then the 1st and 3rd platoons assaulted the village however they made little progress against the well-entrenched PAVN. At 16:00 Company F arrived to reinforce Company H and launched a fresh attack on Ap Bon (2) but was also repulsed. At dusk both Marine companies withdrew and established a night defensive position which the PAVN hit with mortar and machine gun fire until 04:30 on 7 November when they withdrew. At dawn the Marines attacked Ap Bon (2), but found it deserted with most of the bunkers and fighting positions destroyed by airstrikes and artillery fire. The Marines had lost 16 killed in the fighting.

On 10 November 2/5 Marines captured a PAVN officer cadet who had been at Ap Bon (2) who revealed that the village had contained a battalion headquarters which had been destroyed by bombing killing the battalion commander and over 60 soldiers with many more wounded.

== Aftermath ==
The operation concluded on 17 November.
