= Operation Oregon =

Part of the Vietnam War (1966)

- Part of the Vietnam War
Date	19–23 March 1966
Location	Thừa Thiên Province, South Vietnam 16°40′06″N 107°23′40″E
Result	U.S. victory

Belligerents
United States	Viet Cong

Commanders and leaders
BG Lowell English; LCOL Ralph Sullivan	

Units involved
1st Marine Division: 1st Battalion 4th Marines; 2nd Battalion 1st Marines	802nd Battalion

Casualties and losses
11 killed	48 killed 8 captured

Operation Oregon was a United States Marine Corps operation that took place on the Street Without Joy about 36 km northwest of Huế, lasting from 19 to 23 March 1966.

== Prelude ==
On 17 March the Army of the Republic of Vietnam (ARVN) 1st Division had killed more than 50 soldiers of the Viet Cong (VC) 804th Battalion in the area south of the district capital of Phong Điền. The ARVN command asked the Marines to mount an operation 8 km north of Phong Điền. The operation plan called for Companies A and B of the 1st Battalion 4th Marines to be landed by helicopters north and south of Route 597 and then move 4 km southeast to sweep the hamlets of Ap Phu An and Ap Tay Hoang, which were believed to be held by the VC 802nd Battalion. The 2nd Battalion 1st Marines would reinforce if enemy was engaged. The operation was supposed to be launched on 19 March, but bad weather forced a postponement to 20 March.

== Operation ==
=== 20 March ===
The landing of the 1/4 Marines was delayed for four hours by fog. By 10:15, the helicopters of HMM-163 were over the landing zones, where they were met with anti-aircraft fire. Low clouds ruled out air support, but artillery fire from the 4th Battalion, 12th Marines at Phong Điền softened up the landing zones. The Marines started landing by 12:55. Company B moved out from Landing Zone Robin and into a minefield around the hamlet of Ap Chinh An that wounded one Marine. The Marines attempted to take the hamlet but found that the VC had fortified it with bunkers and barbed wire. The Marines withdrew to allow aircraft, artillery, and naval gunfire to hit the Viet Cong positions. At 16:49 Company E was landed to reinforce the Marines but by the evening the attack was halted. The Marines had suffered nine dead and 41 wounded.

=== 21 March ===
Marine artillery bombarded the VC positions while dense fog delayed planned airstrikes. The 1/4 Marines captured Ap Chinh An with minimal opposition as the VC had abandoned their positions during the night. 2/1 Marines was landed at Landing Zone Duck 3 km west of LZ Robin at 11:15 encountering no resistance. The operation continued for the next two days with no further engagements.

== Aftermath ==
Operation Oregon concluded on 23 March. The Marines had suffered 11 dead and 45 wounded; they claimed that the VC had lost 48 killed and eight captured.
