= 341st Division (Vietnam) =

341st Infantry Division
- Allegiance: Vietnam
- Branch: Vietnam People's Army
- Type: Infantry
- Role: Mechanized infantry
- Size: Division
- Nickname(s): Sông Lam (Lam River)
- Engagements: Operation Prairie III; 1975 Spring Offensive; Battle of Xuân Lộc

The 341st Infantry Division is a division of the People's Army of Vietnam, first formed in the 1960s.

== Vietnam War ==
U.S. intelligence indicated that the Division was operating in the Vietnamese Demilitarized Zone (DMZ) by August 1966.

In mid-May 1968 the Division was the target of Operation Mameluke Thrust launched by the 1st Marine Division in the Happy Valley area southwest of Danang, however the Division did not engage the Marines.

In 1974 the Division was converted from a training division to a mobile division part of the PAVN strategic reserve and stationed in souther Military Region 4 immediately north of the DMZ.

During the 1975 Spring Offensive, on 4 March the Division attacked Định Quán District, cleared Route 20 and captured Lâm Đồng Province.

In early April the Division joined PAVN 4th Corps and on 9 April 1975, 4th Corps attacked the Army of the Republic of Vietnam (ARVN) 18th Division around the strategic city of Xuân Lộc part of the last defensive line before Saigon. The Division suffered 1,100 casualties on 9 and 10 April.The 18th Division withstood the initial PAVN attacks and on 12 April were reinforced by men of the elite 1st Airborne Brigade and Vietnamese Marines. By 16 April the battle was turning in favour of the PAVN and on 19 April the ARVN General Staff ordered the units defending Xuân Lộc to withdraw to defend Biên Hòa. On the afternoon of 22 April the Division's headquarters near Xuân Lộc was hit by a CBU-55 bomb dropped from a Republic of Vietnam Air Force C-130, killing over 250 soldiers. The 4th Corps pushed on towards Biên Hòa and at 5pm on 26 April they attacked Bien Hoa Air Base and Long Bình. By the morning of April 28 troops from the 4th Corps overran ARVN positions at the eastern end of the Newport Bridge.
