= Dan Bullock =

United States Marine (1953–1969)

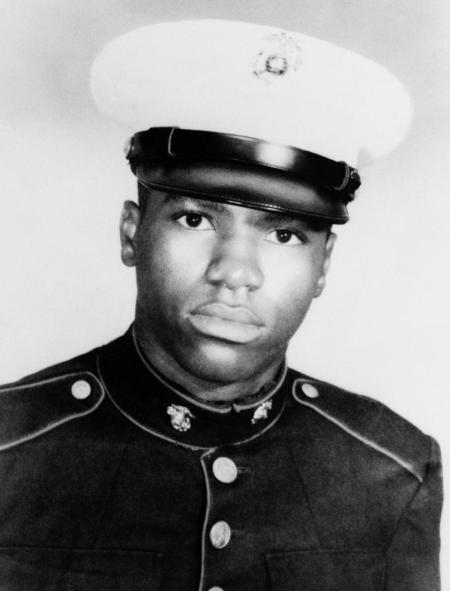
- Born: December 21, 1953; Goldsboro, North Carolina, United States
- Died: June 7, 1969 (aged 15); An Hoa Combat Base, Quảng Nam Province, South Vietnam
- Military career
- Allegiance: United States
- Branch: United States Marine Corps
- Service years: 1968–1969
- Rank: Private first class
- Units: Company F, 2nd Battalion, 5th Marine Regiment, 1st Marine Division
- Conflicts: Vietnam War †

Dan Bullock (December 21, 1953 – June 7, 1969) was a United States Marine and the youngest U.S. serviceman killed in action during the Vietnam War, dying at the age of 15.

== Early life and education ==
Dan Bullock was born in Goldsboro, North Carolina. He lived in North Carolina until he was about 12, when his mother died and he and his younger sister, Gloria, moved to Brooklyn, New York to live with their father and his wife. He said he wanted to become a pilot, a police officer, or a United States Marine.

== Career ==
When Bullock was 14 years old, he altered the date on his birth certificate to show that he was born on December 21, 1949. He processed through the recruiting station, and enlisted in the U.S. Marine Corps on September 18, 1968. He was a member of Platoon 3039 at Parris Island. At first he struggled to make it through, but was able to do so with the help of one of his fellow recruits. Bullock graduated from boot camp on December 10, 1968.

Private First Class Bullock arrived in South Vietnam on May 18, 1969, and was assigned as a rifleman in 2nd Squad, 2nd Platoon, Company F, 2nd Battalion 5th Marines, 1st Marine Division. He was stationed at An Hoa Combat Base, west of Hội An in Quảng Nam Province. Less than a month later on June 7, 1969, Bullock and three other Marines were occupying a bunker near the base airstrip when a People's Army of Vietnam sapper unit attacked the base at night, throwing a satchel charge into the bunker, killing three Marines, including Bullock, who was just 15 years old. He had been assigned to cleaning duty that night, but was transferred to the night watch after one Marine was wounded on night duty.

After Bullock was interred, his grave site did not have a marker. A veteran's marker was finally provided in 2000.

== Legacy ==
On June 7, 2003, a section of Lee Avenue in Brooklyn, where Bullock had lived since age 11, was renamed in his honor. In 2019, a North Carolina state historical marker honoring his life was erected near his childhood home in Goldsboro near 200 West Ash Street. The entrance to Elmwood Cemetery in southwest Goldsboro was named "PFC Dan Bullock Way".

== Military awards ==
Bullock's awards and decorations include:

1st row	Purple Heart		Combat Action Ribbon
2nd row	National Defense Service Medal	Navy Unit Commendation	Republic of Vietnam Civil Actions Medal with frame and palm
3rd row	Vietnam Service Medal with 1 Campaign star	Vietnam Gallantry Cross with frame and palm	Vietnam Campaign Medal
