= Operation Georgia =

Part of the Vietnam War (1966)

- Part of the Vietnam War
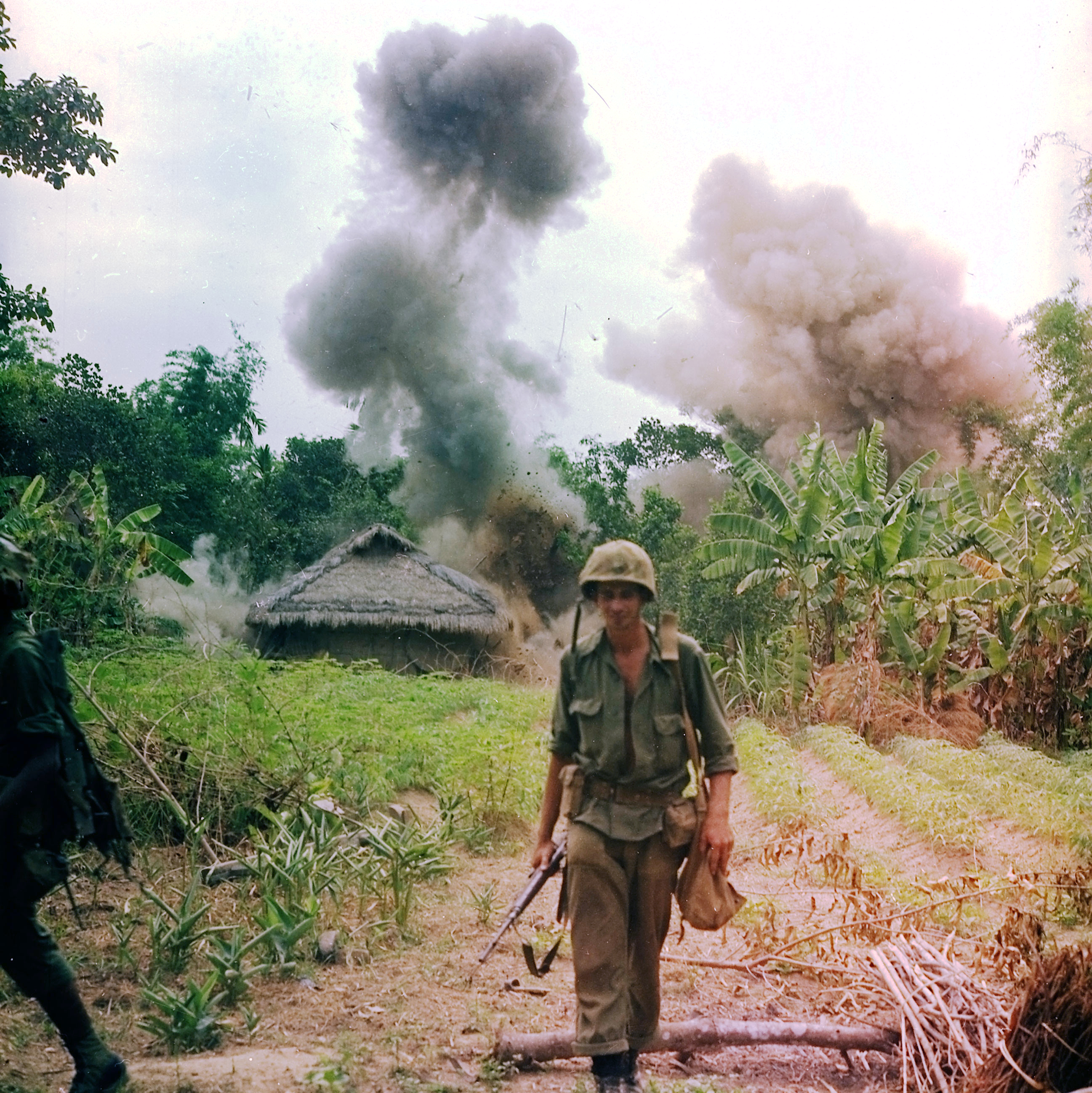
- 3/9 Marines destroy Viet Cong positions
Date	21 April – 10 May 1966
Location	Quảng Nam province, South Vietnam 15.785°N 108.073°E

Belligerents
United States	Viet Cong

Commanders and leaders
Lt. Col. William W. Taylor; Lt. Col. Paul C. Trammell	

Units involved
3rd Battalion, 9th Marines	R-20 Battalion; V-25 Battalion

Casualties and losses
9 killed	103 killed

Operation Georgia was a U.S. Marine Corps security operation around the An Hoa Industrial Complex in western Quảng Nam province, lasting from 21 April to 10 May 1966.

== Prelude ==
In mid-April, the 9th Marine Regiment began planning for an operation to provide security for the An Hoa Industrial Complex in western Quảng Nam province. Operational orders were completed on 14 April and the mission was assigned to the 3rd Battalion, 9th Marines. On 20 April the 3/9 Marines established a forward headquarters at An Hoa airstrip deploying Company L and Battery F, 12th Marine Regiment there.

== Operation ==
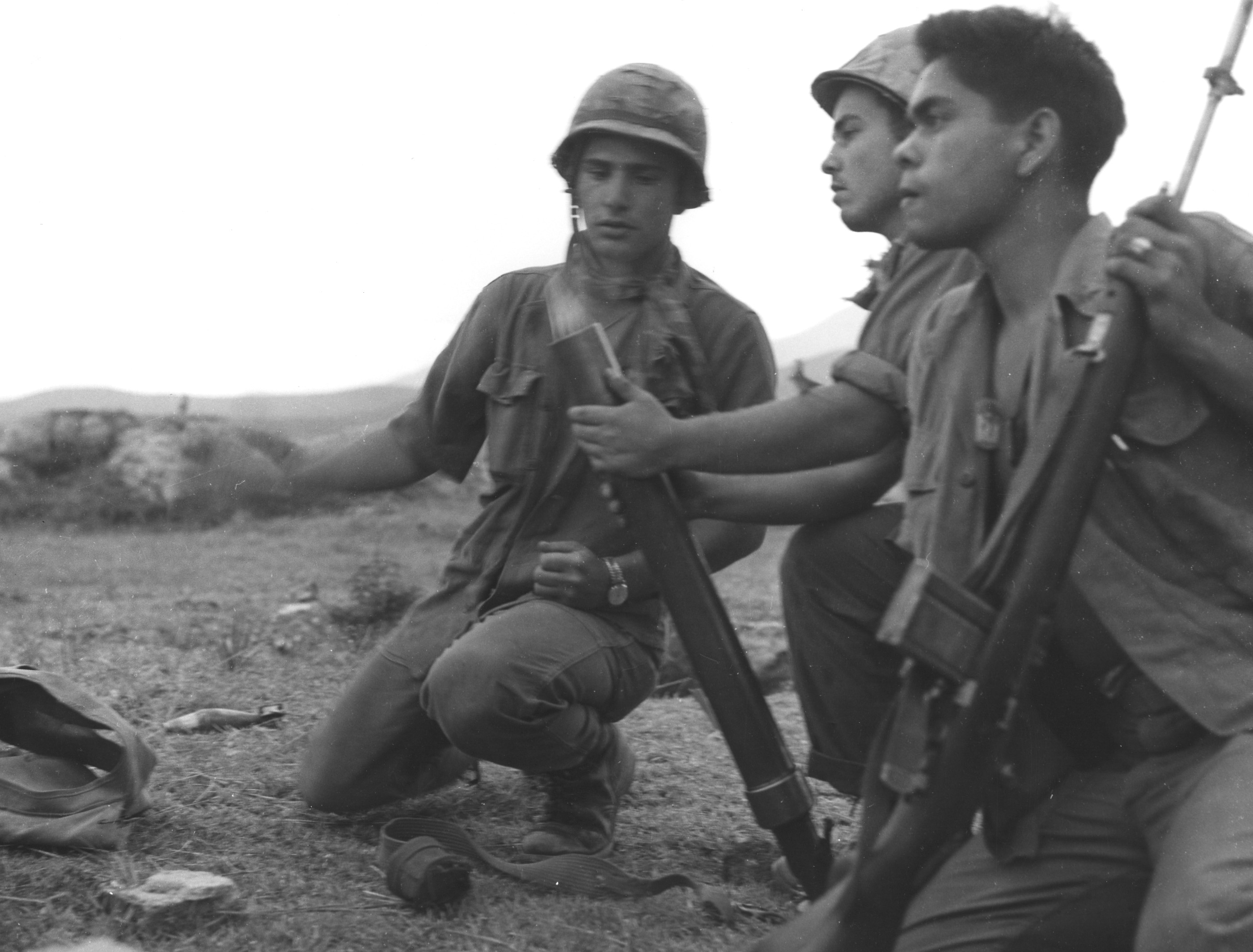
Marines fire a 60 mm mortar

The operation commenced on 21 April with the continued build up for forces at An Hoa airstrip with 2 companies arriving on LVTHs of Company B, 1st Amphibian Tractor Battalion and Company I, 3/9 Marines and Battery B, 12th Marines arriving by air.

The Marines divided up the area of operations into 20 company-sized areas and began systematic sweeps with the local South Vietnamese Popular Force, meeting minimal opposition apart from occasional mines and mortar fire. A platoon from the 3rd Reconnaissance Battalion operating in the southwestern part of the operational area called in air and artillery strikes on Viet Cong (VC) forces killing at least 30.

On 3 May as Company M was crossing the Thu Bồn River on LVTHs to search the hamlet of Phu Long (1) they were fired on by VC, later identified as coming from the R-20 Battalion. A 4-hour firefight followed before Company M, reinforced by 2 other companies and with air and artillery support secured the hamlet, finding 15 VC dead for the loss of 5 Marines.

== Aftermath ==
Operation Georgia concluded on 10 May, the Marines had lost 9 killed and the U.S. claimed the Vietcong had 103 killed. While the operation officially concluded, the Marines established a permanent presence in the area, developing the airstrip into An Hoa Combat Base.
