= Happy Valley, Vietnam =

Valley near Đà Nẵng, Vietnam

Happy Valley (15°55′00″N 107°58′00″E) was the name given by US Marines to a valley southwest of Danang in Quảng Nam Province, Vietnam

== Vietnam War ==
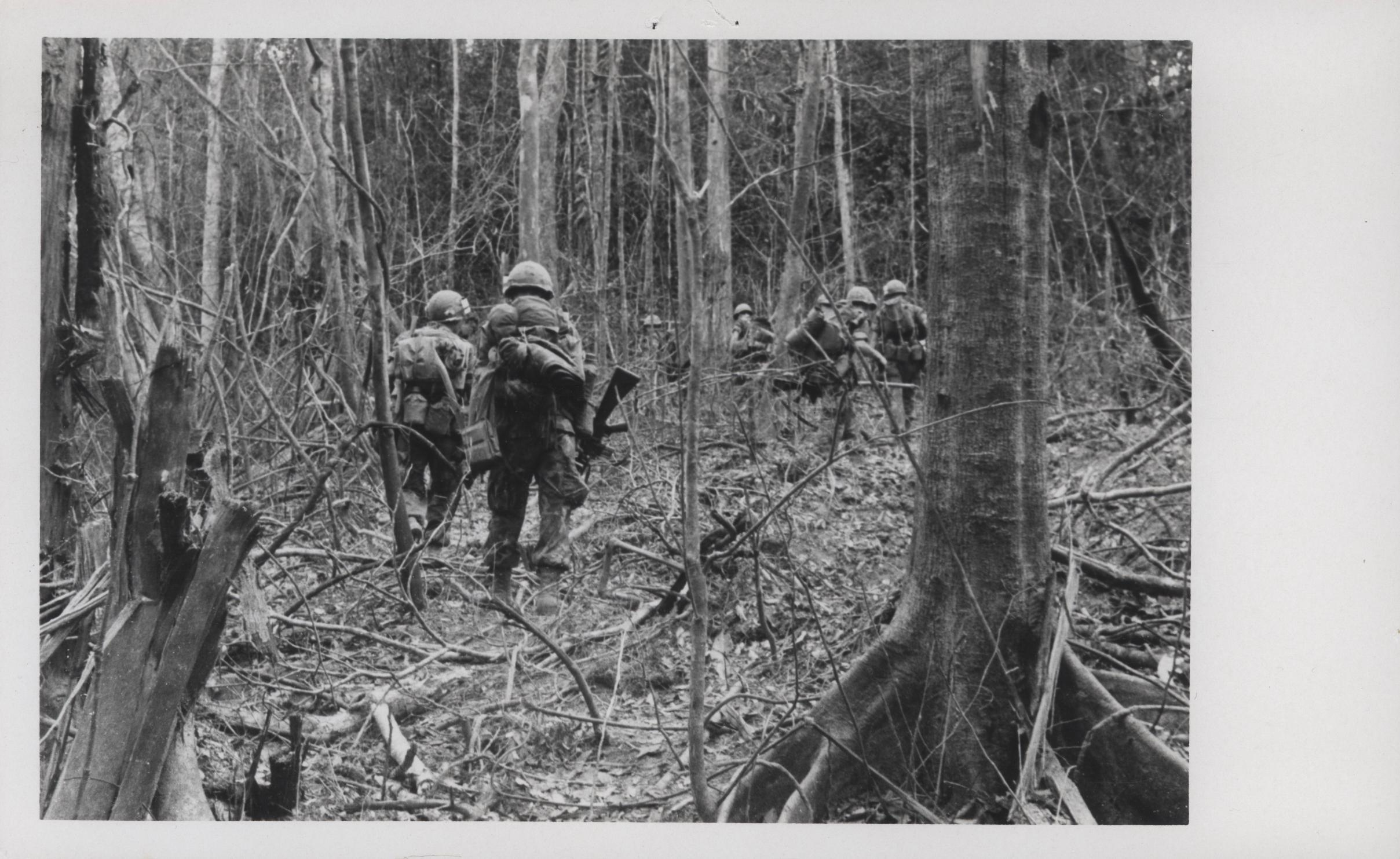
3/26 Marines move through Happy Valley during Operation Oklahoma Hills

=== Base camp ===
Happy Valley was a major Vietcong (VC)/People's Army of Vietnam (PAVN) base camp, storage area and supply infiltration route. Men and material would move from PAVN base areas near Ai Yen 20 km east of the Laotian border, down Route 614, to units operating near Song Tuy Loan or other positions overlooking or surrounding the Danang vital area, comprising Danang City, Danang Air Base, Red Beach Base Area, port facilities, and Marble Mountain Air Facility. The PAVN would fire 122mm rockets (with a range of 12 km) from the hills overlooking Danang (the "Rocket Belt") at the city and military facilities. The Happy Valley area was covered by dense undergrowth and elephant grass 7–10 feet (2.1–3.0 m) tall.

=== Engagements ===
The Valley was the scene of numerous engagements during the Vietnam War, to disrupt PAVN movement and counter the rocket belt, including:

Operation Mameluke Thrust

Operation Mameluke Thrust was a 1st Marine Division operation from 19 May to 23 October 1968 resulting in 269 U.S. and 2,728 PAVN killed.

Operation Oklahoma Hills

Operation Oklahoma Hills a clear and search operation mounted by the 1st Battalion, 7th Marines, 2nd Battalion, 7th Marines, 3rd Battalion, 7th Marines and 3rd Battalion, 26th Marines and ARVN 51st Regiment from 1 March to 29 May 1969.
