= Thường Ðức Camp =

Site information
- Type: Army Base

Location
- Coordinates: 15.84°N 107.931°E

Site history
- Built: 1966
- In use: 1966-74
- Battles/wars: Vietnam War; Battle of Thượng Đức (1974)

Garrison information
- Occupants: 5th Special Forces Group

Ha Tan Airfield
- IATA: none; ICAO: none

Summary
- Elevation AMSL: 66 ft (20 m)

Runways
Direction	Length		Surface
Direction	ft	m	Surface
	2,300	701	dirt/clay/rock

Thường Ðức Camp (also known as Thường Ðức Special Forces Camp) is a former U.S. Army and Army of the Republic of Vietnam (ARVN) base southwest of Da Nang in Quảng Nam Province, central Vietnam.

== History ==
The 5th Special Forces Group Detachment A-109 first established a base at the location in March 1966 to monitor communist infiltration into the Da Nang vital area. The base was located near Route 14, approximately 40 km southwest of Da Nang.

On 28 September 1968, the People's Army of Vietnam (PAVN) attacked and temporarily overran the base. In response, the U.S. Marines launched Operation Maui Peak from 6 to 19 October to relieve the siege. The forces involved included the 1st Battalion, 1st Marines, 2nd Battalion, 5th Marines, 3rd Battalion, 5th Marines, 2nd Battalion, 7th Marines and 3rd Battalion, 7th Marines and resulted in an estimated 353 PAVN killed for the loss of 28 Marines.

On 19 October 1970, the PAVN/VC attacked Thường Ðức but were repelled by ARVN forces with artillery and air support including from helicopters. The PAVN/VC withdrew after two days, having suffered 163 killed and 20 captured.

In July 1974, Thường Ðức was attacked again by a Regiment of the PAVN's 324th Division starting the Battle of Thượng Đức (1974). In November 1974, by the end of the battle, the PAVN occupied Thường Ðức.

== Current use ==
The base is now partly a cemetery, while the remainder has returned to jungle.
