= An Hoa Combat Base =

An Hòa Combat Base
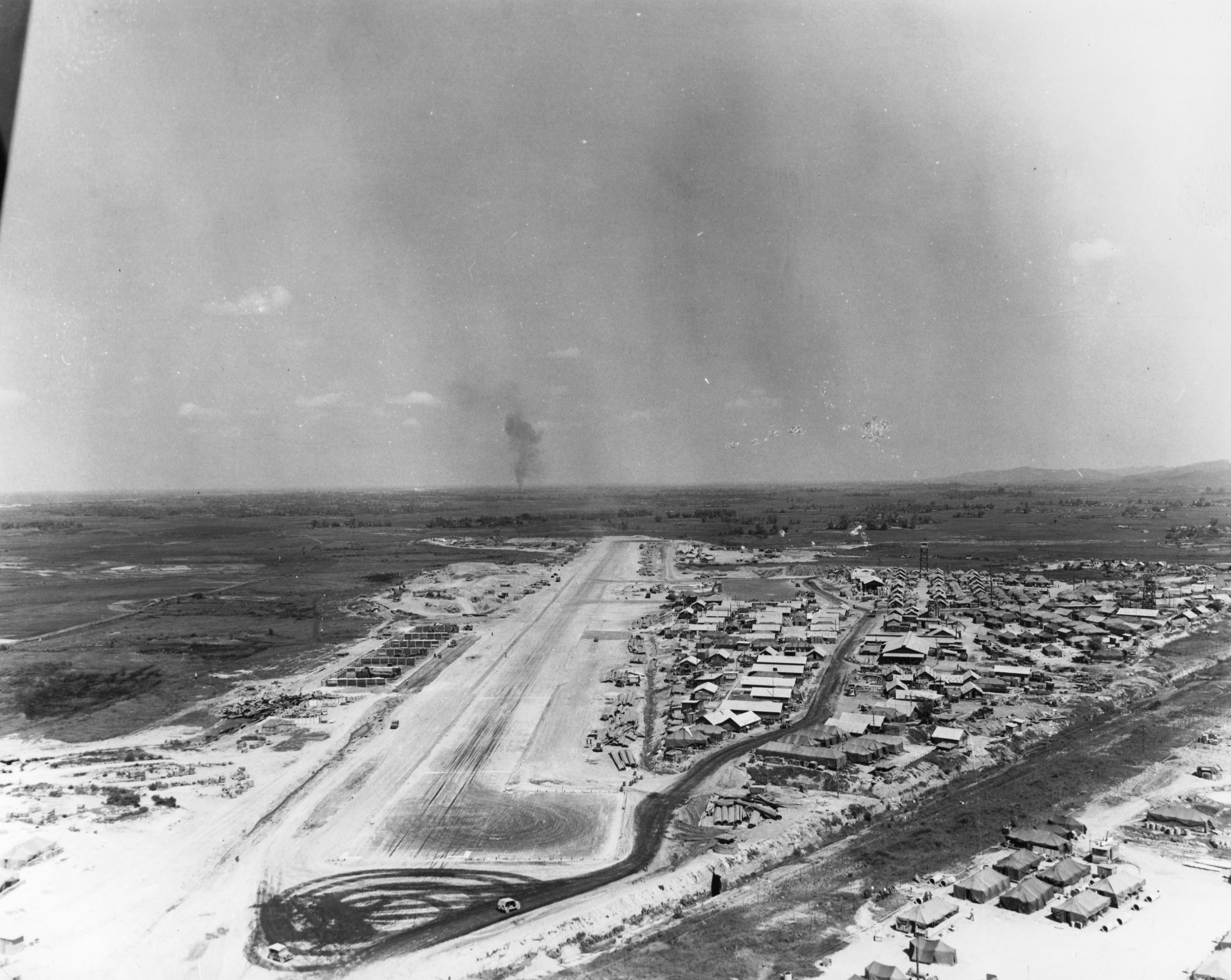
- An Hòa Combat Base, 27 January 1969

Site information
- Type: Marines
- Condition: abandoned

Location
- Coordinates: 15.785°N 108.073°E

Site history
- Built: 1966
- In use: 1966–70
- Battles/wars: Vietnam War

Garrison information
- Occupants: 3rd Marine Division; 1st Marine Division

An Hòa Airfield
- IATA: none; ICAO: none

Summary
- Elevation AMSL: 66 ft (20 m)
- Interactive map of An Hòa Airfield

Runways
| Direction | Length | | Surface |
| Direction | ft | m | Surface |
|---|---|---|---|
| | 2,700 | 823 | asphalt |

An Hòa Combat Base (also known as Đức Dục) is a former U.S. Marine Corps and Army of the Republic of Vietnam (ARVN) base west of Hội An in Quảng Nam Province, Vietnam.

== History ==
The base was located approximately 28 km west of Hội An and 4 km west northwest of the Mỹ Sơn temple complex, near to the Tỉnh Yên River (Thu Bồn River) and the An Hòa industrial complex.

An Hòa was located southeast of a major Vietcong (VC)/People's Army of Vietnam (PAVN) base area known as the Arizona Territory across the Vu Gia River.

In December 1965, Naval Mobile Construction Battalion 3 completed the upgrading of An Hòa Combat Base's airstrip within five days for use by the 1st Marine Aircraft Wing. The process involved removing old mesh matting, preparing a new soil-cement base, and then laying the new matting. While the facility was closed to fixed-wing traffic, Marine helicopters still conducted over 400 flight operations including the movement of an entire battalion.

=== Operations ===
The base was first used by the Marines in January 1966 during Operation Mallard when the 1st Battalion, 12th Marines established a firebase there while the 1st Battalion, 3rd Marines and a Company from the 2nd Battalion, 9th Marines swept the surrounding area. On 20 April 1966 the Marines returned to An Hòa on Operation Georgia, the 12th Marines reestablished a firebase while the 3rd Battalion 9th Marines provided security, the base would become permanent at this time as the Marines sought to pacify the area. On 6 July 5 Marine Battalions launched Operation Macon around the An Hòa area, the operation continued into October resulting in 24 Marines and 380 VC killed.

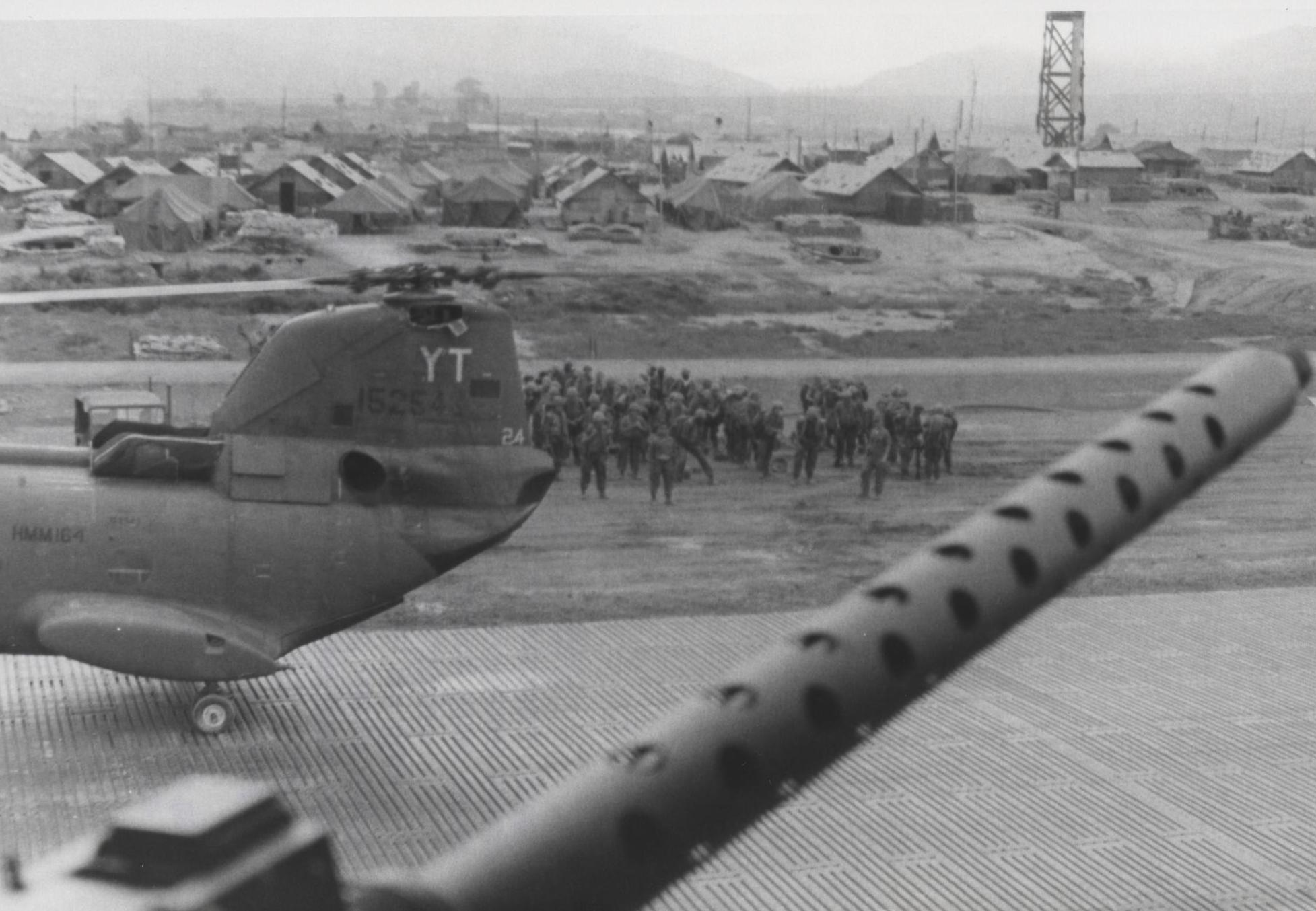
Marines waiting to board HMM-164 helicopters at An Hòa in 1968

In August 1966 the Marines completed the construction of the MSR (main supply route) between Da Nang and An Hòa, naming it the "Liberty Road". It was decided that a bridge would be built to shorten the route. From April to September 1967 Seabees of Mobile Construction Battalion 4 built a 2,040 feet (620 m) "Liberty bridge" (Tự Do bridge, now the Giao Thủy bridge) over the Thu Bồn river.

The airfield was capable of handling C-7, C-123 and C-130 aircraft.

On the night of 21 November 1968, a PAVN/VC battalion attacked the base. Supported by fire from 82mm and 60mm mortars, 57mm recoilless rifles and B-44 rockets, PAVN and VC troops advanced against the base's eastern perimeter. When the attack began at 22:00, Marine tank and artillery crews on the perimeter began direct fire against the advancing PAVN/VC, using Beehive anti-personnel rounds. Amphibian tractors arrived and added the weight of their machine guns to the battle. Combined Action Platoon (CAP) 2-9-1, positioned in the hamlet of Mau Chanh (2), about a kilometer east of the base, lay in the path of the attack. The CAP Marines and their South Vietnamese Popular Force (PF) counterparts took the PAVN/VC flanks and rear under fire, calling for air and artillery support. At 23:30, the PAVN/VC troops fell on CAP 2-9-1. AC-47 gunships held back the PAVN/VC while a platoon of Marines mounted in amphibian tractors, with tanks and helicopter gunships escorting, attacked east from An Hoa to reinforce the hamlet and bring an ammunition resupply. The battle raged for five hours, during which the Marines threw back four attack waves. At 03:30 the shooting died down. Despite the heavy fighting, friendly casualties numbered only three Marines and a PF with minor wounds. Marine sources listed 21 dead PAVN/VC in the area.

Marine PFC Dan Bullock, the youngest American serviceman killed in action in the Vietnam War died at An Hòa on 7 June 1969.

The 2nd Battalion, 5th Marines handed over the base to the ARVN 1st Battalion, 51st Regiment on 15 October 1970.

== Current use ==
The base is abandoned and has reverted to jungle. Remains of the runway can still be seen.
