= 26th Marine Regiment (United States) =

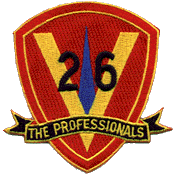
- 26th Marine Regiment emblem
- Country: United States of America
- Branch: United States Marine Corps
- Type: Infantry
- Part of: 5th Marine Division (WWII); 5th Marine Division then 1st and 3rd Marine Divisions once it returned to CONUS (Vietnam)
- Garrison/HQ: Deactivated
- Nickname: "The Professionals"
- Engagements: World War II: Battle of Iwo Jima; Vietnam War: Battle of Khe Sanh

Commanders
- Notable commanders: David E. Lownds

The 26th Marine Regiment (26th Marines) is an inactivated infantry regiment of the United States Marine Corps. The 26th Marines were activated in 1944 and fought in the Battle of Iwo Jima during World War II and were activated again on 1 March 1966, and fought in the Battle of Khe Sanh during the Vietnam War.

== Subordinate units ==
The regiment was composed of three infantry battalions and one headquarters company:

Battalions
Headquarters Company 26th Marines
1st Battalion, 26th Marines (1/26) – Seabrook
2nd Battalion, 26th Marines (2/26)
3rd Battalion, 26th Marines (3/26)

== History ==
=== World War II ===
==== Commissioning and training ====
The 26th Marine Regiment was commissioned on January 10, 1944 at Marine Corps Base Camp Pendleton, California.

==== Iwo Jima ====
On D-Day at Iwo Jima, the 26th Marine Regiment was originally the V Amphibious Corps' reserve. Relieved of the mission with the arrival of the 21st Marine Regiment, the regiment came ashore on the afternoon of February 19, 1945 and established defensive positions on the southwestern end of South Field (Iwo Jima). The next day when the 5th Marine Division went into the assault, the regiment remained in place as the regimental reserve. On February 22, under a heavy rain and while receiving heavy enemy fire, the regiment relieved the 27th Marine Regiment on the Division's left flank and continued attacking to the north in an attempt to secure the airfield.

During the battle the 26th Regiment suffered 622 Marines killed and 2025 wounded in action.

==== Post-war activities ====
The Regimental Headquarters returned from the Pacific Theater on February 19, 1946 when the USS Sarasota (APA-204) docked at Naval Base San Diego. The 26th Marines was decommissioned on March 5, 1946.

=== Vietnam ===
On 1 March 1966 the 26th Marine Regiment was activated at Camp Pendleton initiating the formation of the 5th Marine Division.

The regimental headquarters arrived in South Vietnam on 26 April 1967. In mid-May 1967, following the conclusion of The Hill Fights, the 26th Marines took over responsibility for the area around Khe Sanh from the 3rd Marines as Operation Crockett. The 26th Marines conducted Operation Ardmore a search and destroy mission in the Khe Sanh area from 17 July-31 October 1967. At the conclusion of Operation Ardmore the Marines commenced Operation Scotland, the defense of Khe Sanh Combat Base and search and destroy missions against People's Army of Vietnam (PAVN) infiltration. From 21 January 1968 the 26th Marines were under siege at Khe Sanh until the conclusion of Operation Pegasus on 14 April 1968 and were replaced by the 1st Marines on 15 April 1968. The 26th Marines were awarded a Presidential Unit Citation for their actions during the Battle of Khe Sanh as were the Seabees that supported them.

The 3rd Battalion, 26th Marines participated in Operation Kingfisher around Con Thien from 7–11 September 1967.

The 1st and 3rd Battalions, 26th Marines participated in Operation Mameluke Thrust from May–June 1968.

The 1st Battalion, 26th Marines participated in Operation Allen Brook from 26 May to 6 June 1968.

The 3rd Battalion, 26th Marines fought in Operation Oklahoma Hills from 1 March to 29 May 1969.

At the beginning of 1970 the 26th Marines were responsible for the defense of the northern and western approaches to Da Nang. As part of Operation Keystone Bluejay the regiment stood down for deactivation in late February to early March with the 1st Marines taking over most of their tactical area of responsibility. From 11 to 19 March 1970 the regiment redeployed from South Vietnam and was inactivated.

== Unit awards ==
A unit citation or commendation is an award bestowed upon an organization for the action cited. Members of the unit who participated in said actions are allowed to wear on their uniforms the awarded unit citation. The 26th Marine Regiment has been presented with the following awards:

| Streamer | Award | Year(s) | Additional Info |
|---|---|---|---|
| | Presidential Unit Citation Streamer with two Bronze Stars | 1945, 1966–67, 1968 | Iwo Jima, Vietnam, Khe Sanh |
| | Navy Unit Commendation Streamer | 1968 | Vietnam |
| | Asiatic-Pacific Campaign Streamer one Bronze Star | 1945 | Iwo Jima |
| | World War II Victory Streamer | 1944–1945 | Pacific War |
| | National Defense Service Streamer | 1966–1974 | Vietnam War |
| | Vietnam Service Streamer | | |
| | Vietnam Gallantry Cross with Palm Streamer | | |
| | Vietnam Meritorious Unit Citation Civil Actions Streamer | | |

== See also ==
- List of United States Marine Corps regiments
- Organization of the United States Marine Corps
