= Operation Oklahoma Hills =

Part of the Vietnam War (1969)

- Part of the Vietnam War
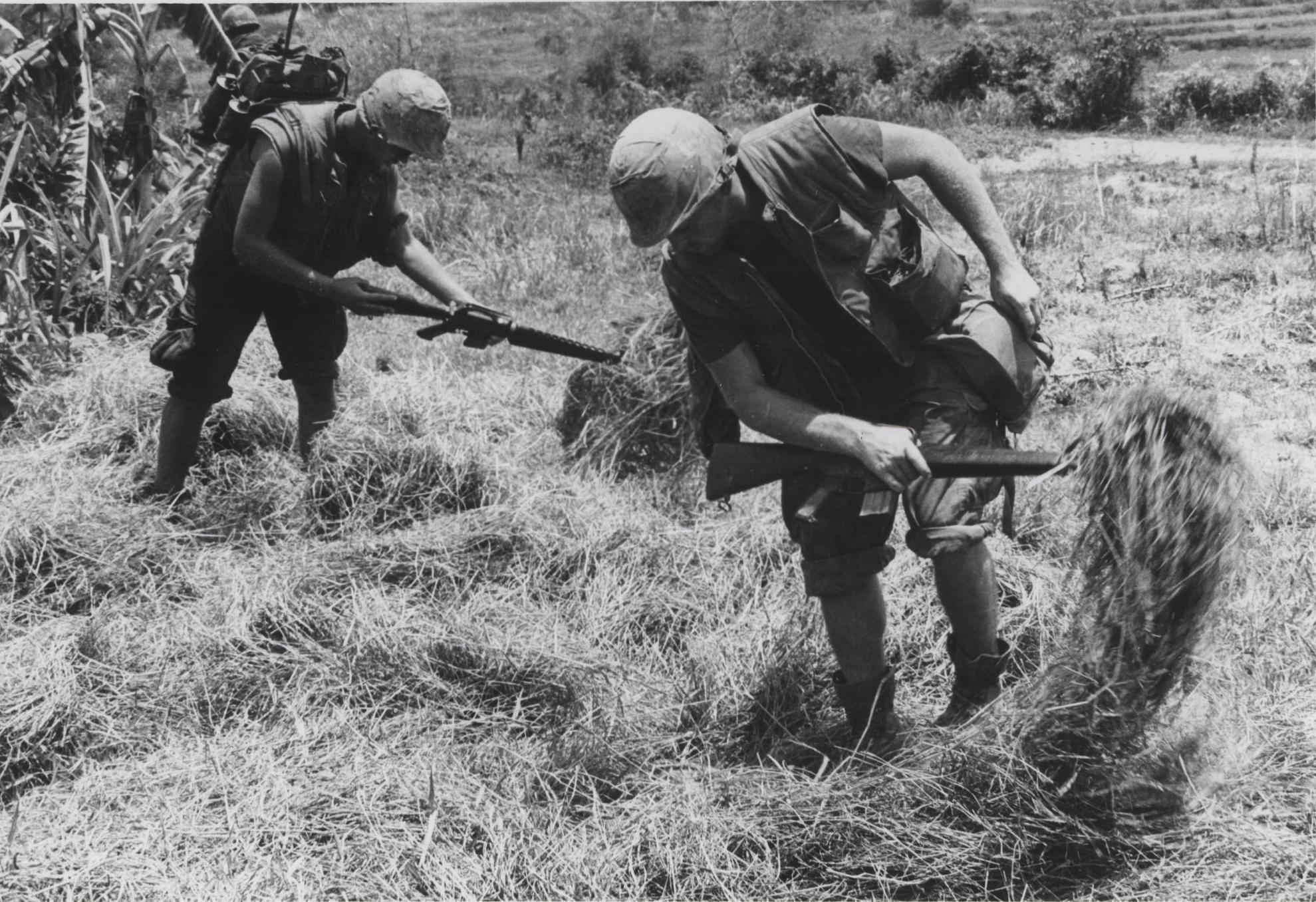
- Marines search for enemy supply caches during Operation Oklahoma Hills
Date	31 March – 29 May 1969
Location	Quảng Nam Province, South Vietnam
Result	Allies claim operational success

Belligerents
United States; South Vietnam	North Vietnam

Commanders and leaders
MG Ormond R. Simpson; Col. Robert L. Nichols	

Units involved
(United States) 3rd Battalion, 1st Marines; 7th Marine Regiment; 3rd Battalion, 26th Marines (South Vietnam) 51st Regiment	31st Regiment; 141st Regiment

Casualties and losses
(United States) 44 killed	US body count: 589 killed

Operation Oklahoma Hills was a clear and search operation during the Vietnam War mounted by the 1st Marine Division and the Army of the Republic of Vietnam (ARVN) 51st Regiment from 31 March to 29 May 1969.

== Background ==
The objective was to clear out People's Army of Vietnam (PAVN) units from their base camps and infiltration routes in the hills and valleys of Quảng Nam Province, southwest of Da Nang, particularly Happy Valley and Charlie Ridge (15.936°N 108.095°E) 20–25 km southwest of Da Nang.

The Marines had previously scoured the area in Operation Mameluke Thrust and Operation Maui Peak both of which ended in October 1968. Defector and prisoner interrogations gave intelligence about a renewed buildup of PAVN forces in the area and one prisoner, a captain in the 141st Regiment, gave detailed intelligence on infiltration routes into the area. He revealed that the main infiltration route was from Ai Yen along Route 614 and into Happy Valley, while another branch followed the Song Con river south to An Dien 8 km northeast of Thường Ðức Camp and then along the Vu Gia River into Base Area 112 or Charlie Ridge. As the Marines had recently neutralized Base Area 112 in Operation Taylor Common it was decided that the next operation would be to clear the hills west of Da Nang.

The terrain was expected to be a major challenge as Charlie Ridge was a steep and narrow mountain range with numerous gullies and ravines with thick undergrowth and dense overhead cover, while Happy Valley was covered by dense undergrowth, all of this would limit the effectiveness of supporting arms and make helicopter support more difficult.

On 21 March the 1st Battalion, 7th Marines began a 10 km march west along Route 4 from Firebase Rawhide to take Hill 52. On 24 March Company C secured Hill 52 and the Marines began construction of Firebase Mustang and on 30 March Battery K, 4th Battalion, 11th Marines was in position at Mustang.

== Operation ==
After sunset on 30 March the 2nd Battalion, 7th Marines landed at Hill 10 establishing Firebase Stallion and they began moving west into the operational area, at the same time 3rd Battalion, 7th Marines landed on Hill 41 and also began moving west and by the following morning both battalions were in positions along the slopes of Charlie Ridge.

At 11:00 on 31 March HMM-165 helicopters landed the ARVN 2nd Battalion, 51st Regiment northeast of Thường Ðức Camp and the 3rd Battalion, 51st Regiment northwest of the camp. On 1 April the 3rd Battalion, 26th Marines and the 4.2in mortar battery from 1st Battalion, 13th Marines were landed at Landing Zone Robin overlooking Happy Valley.

With the forces in place the 2/7 Marines and 3/7 Marines advanced west searching Charlie Ridge while the 3/26 Marines and the ARVN battalions searched southeast and northeast. Movement was extremely difficult in the thick jungle and the forces soon restricted themselves to operating along the network of trails, establishing company base camps and then sending platoon radiating out to search the trail network.

On 1 April a reconnaissance team captured a PAVN sergeant from the 141st Regiment and Company K, 3/7 Marines captured a warrant officer from the 31st Regiment and they each revealed the location of their regimental base camps. Col. Robert L. Nichols decided to attack the base camp of the 141st Regiment near the summit of Hill 1166 and the 3/26 Marines was ordered to advance south up the ridgeline towards the Hill while 3/7 Marines advance from the east. By the afternoon of 7 April 3/26 Marines had secured Hill 1166 and 3/7 Marines had secured Hill 1062 nearby. On the morning 8 April 3/26 Marines descended into the ravine containing the base camp engaging 20 PAVN soldiers as they attempted to escape to the southwest. The next day 3/26 Marines continued to search the camp area skirmishing with small groups of PAVN. On 11 April 2/7 Marines advanced on the 31st Regiment base camp on Hill 745 discovering over 200 structures. By 15 April the PAVN had abandoned their base areas.

1/7 Marines patrolled the south of the operational area along the Vu Gia carrying out ambushes of likely PAVN lines of communication between Charlie Ridge and the Arizona Territory to the south and on the night of 13 April ambushed a group of 30 PAVN as they crossed the river killing 14.

On 21 April 2/7 Marines and Battery H 3/11 Marines were withdrawn from the operation and replaced by an ARVN battalion on Firebase Buckskin on Hill 502. The remaining units participating in the operation were now assigned general areas of responsibility sweeping Happy Valley and Charlie Ridge encountering scattered groups of PAVN.

On the afternoon of 21 April intelligence indicated that a PAVN force was moving from the Arizona Territory north towards the Vu Gia and 1/7 Marines established ambush positions along the north bank of the river. After sunset small groups of PAVN were observed on the south bank of the river but the Marines held their fire and at 21:00 a large group of PAVN emerged from the bush on the south bank bring 17 small boats with them. When the PAVN boats started crossing the river the 1/7 Marines opened fire with recoilless rifles, 81mm mortars, machine-gun and rifle fire while pre-registered artillery engaged the PAVN remaining on the south bank. 57 PAVN dead were later counted floating in the river. At dawn on 22 April air strikes hit the south bank and at 09:30 Company B, 1/7 Marines boarded LVT-5s to cross the river and search the south bank finding a further 14 dead PAVN.

On 29 April the area of operations was extended south of the Vu Gia into the northern Arizona Territory and that night Companies B and D, 1/7 Marines crossed the river and established positions near the village of My Hoa. On the morning of 30 April the two companies advanced southeast and Company B on the right flank was engaged by a PAVN force, Company D then swung round to the northwest and both companies then began attacking southwest into a PAVN force estimated to be two companies strong. The fighting continued throughout the day and into 1 May and the 3rd Battalion, 1st Marines operating north of Go Noi Island to the northeast was sent by truck to assist the 1/7 Marines. On the morning of 2 May 3/1 Marines began advancing east and by midday had linked up with 1/7 Marines and that evening both battalions crossed north over the Vu Gia. The sweep of the northern Arizona Territory had killed 60 PAVN for the loss of 9 Marines.

On 2 May Companies K and L, 3/26 Marines and Battery C, 1/13 Marines were withdrawn from the operation.

From 6–12 May Company I, 3/7 Marines conducted a sweep of the Song Tan Thong river area west of Happy Valley with minimal results.

On 9 May 3/1 Marines left the operation.

On 21 May Company L, 3/7 Marines began a 5-day sweep of the Ken Valley with minimal results.

On 26 May after completing the destruction of the 31st Regiment base the ARVN 1st Battalion, 51st Regiment was withdrawn from the operation and on 29 May after destroying the remaining firebases the 3/7 Marines withdrew from the area.

== Aftermath ==
The operation concluded on 29 May. The operation was regarded as a success because while the PAVN generally did not stand and fight, the disruption of their base areas and lines of communication was believed to have led to a substantial decline in activity in the Da Nang area. Forty-four Marines were killed during the operation and 439 suffered injuries requiring medical evacuation. The US claimed that 589 PAVN were killed.
