= 3rd Battalion, 26th Marines =

- Country: United States of America
- Branch: United States Marine Corps
- Type: Infantry regiment
- Role: Locate, close with and destroy the enemy with fire and maneuver
- Size: 1,000
- Part of: Inactive
- Engagements: World War II: Battle of Iwo Jima; Vietnam War: Operation Kingfisher; Battle of Khe Sanh; Operation Mameluke Thrust; Operation Meade River; Operation Bold Mariner; Operation Taylor Common; Operation Oklahoma Hills

The 3rd Battalion, 26th Marines (3/26) is an inactive infantry battalion of the United States Marine Corps. They were part of the 26th Marine Regiment and 5th Marine Division and fought during the Battle of Iwo Jima in World War II. They were activated again for the Vietnam War but were deactivated after the war and remain inactive today.

== History ==
=== Vietnam War ===
On 1 March 1966 the 26th Marine Regiment was activated at Camp Pendleton initiating the formation of the 5th Marine Division. The battalion was deployed from the United States to Okinawa in October 1966. From 4 October until 10 December the battalion formed the battalion landing team (BLT) of the Special Landing Force. On 11 December the battalion arrived in South Vietnam. On 17 December the battalion moved by road from Dong Ha Combat Base into the Co Bi-Thanh Tan corridor where they initiated Operation Chinook.

In mid-May 1967, following the conclusion of The Hill Fights, the 1st Battalion, 26th Marines took over responsibility for the area around Khe Sanh Combat Base from the 3rd Marines as Operation Crockett and the battalion was subsequently deployed to support them on 13 June. The 26th Marines conducted Operation Ardmore a search and destroy mission in the Khe Sanh area from 17 July-31 October 1967. At the conclusion of Operation Ardmore the Marines commenced Operation Scotland, the defense of Khe Sanh Combat Base and search and destroy missions against People's Army of Vietnam (PAVN) infiltration. The battalion participated in Operation Kingfisher around Con Thien from 7–11 September 1967. In early November the battalion provided security at Camp Evans. They were relieved by the 1st Battalion 9th Marines on 22 November and then conducted small-unit patrols and company-size sweeps with Army of the Republic of Vietnam (ARVN) forces in the CoBi-Thanh Tan area. On 13 December the battalion redeployed by air to Khe Sanh, they conducted a four-day sweep of a ridge line west of the combat base, then settled into new positions. Companies I and K occupied Hills 881 South and 861, respectively and Company L joined the 1/26th at the combat base proper.

From 21 January 1968 the 26th Marines were under siege at Khe Sanh until the conclusion of Operation Pegasus on 14 April 1968 and were replaced by the 1st Marines on 15 April 1968 with the battalion flying to Quang Tri Combat Base. The 26th Marines was transferred from the operational control of the 3rd Marine Division to the 1st Marine Division on 18 May 1968. The battalion and 1/26th Marines participated in Operation Mameluke Thrust from 18 May until 20 July 1968 when they went Phu Bai Combat Base to relieve the 5th Marine Regiment conducting Operation Houston. On the conclusion of Operation Houston on 12 September the 26th Marines were moved south to the Da Nang TAOR. The battalion participated in Operation Meade River from 20 November to 9 December 1968.

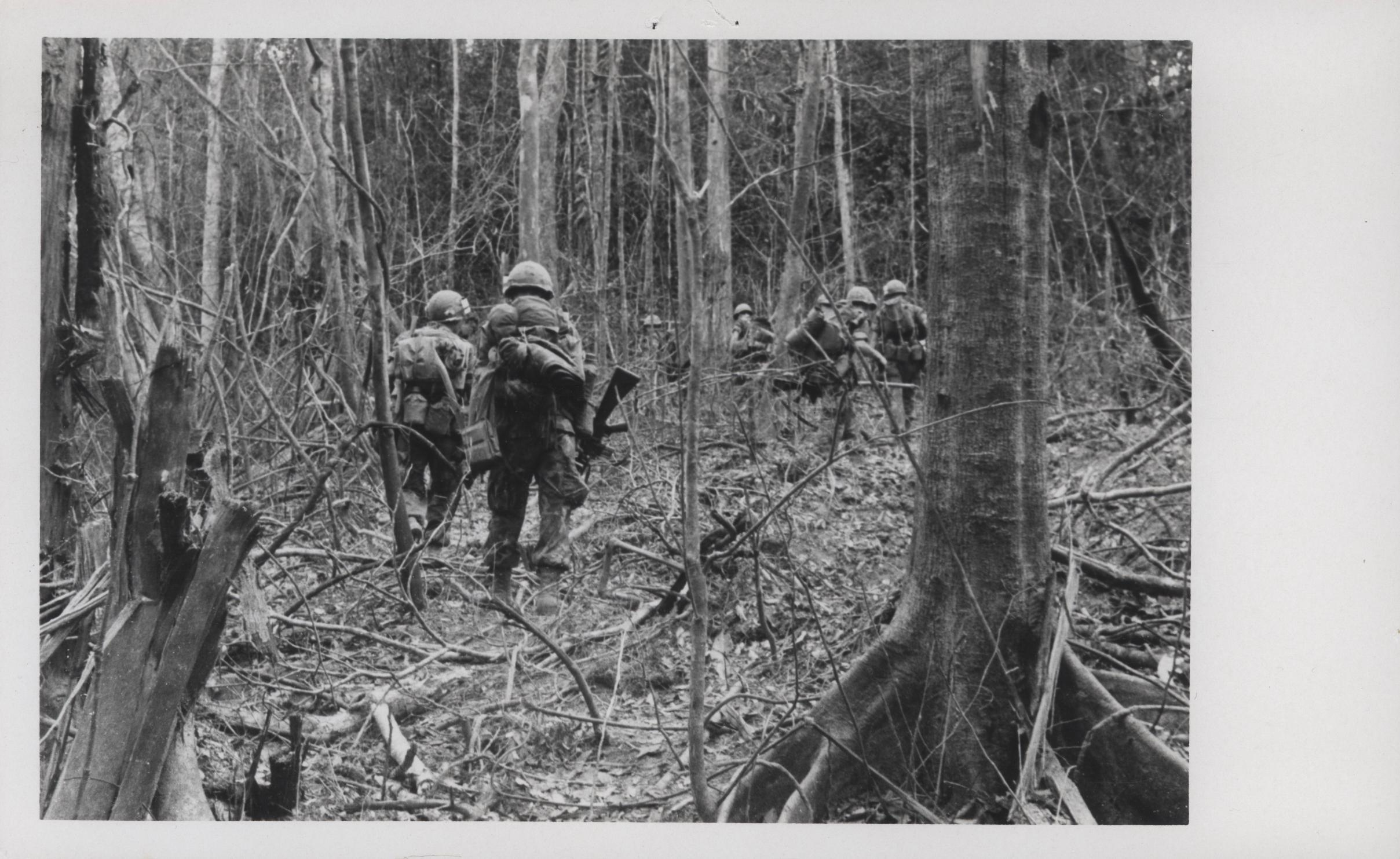
Company M, 3/26th Marines patrol during Operation Oklahoma Hills

From 12 January to 7 February 1969 the battalion operating as BLT 3/26 conducted Operation Bold Mariner with BLT 2/26. BLT 3/26 then joined Operation Taylor Common on 10 February until they were relieved on 20 March and went to An Hoa Combat Base for rehabilitation. The battalion fought in Operation Oklahoma Hills from 31 March to 29 May 1969. From 4 May until 10 June they returned to sea for BLT duty. On 21 September the 5th Marine Division was deactivated however the 26th Marines were assigned to the 1st Marine Division.

At the beginning of 1970 the 26th Marines were responsible for the defense of the northern and western approaches to Da Nang. Battalion companies protected the Nam O Bridge, where Route 1 crosses the Cu De River and held positions on Hills 190 and 124 and Outpost Reno. As part of Operation Keystone Bluejay the regiment stood down for deactivation in late February to early March with the 1st Marines taking over most of their tactical area of responsibility. On 1 March, the 3rd Battalion, 1st Marines relieved the battalion. From 11 to 19 March 1970 the 26th Marine Regiment redeployed from South Vietnam and was inactivated.

== See also ==
- History of the United States Marine Corps
- List of United States Marine Corps battalions
