= 1st Battalion, 26th Marines =

- Country: United States of America
- Branch: United States Marine Corps
- Type: Infantry regiment
- Role: Locate, close with and destroy the enemy with fire and maneuver
- Size: 1000
- Part of: Inactive
- Engagements: World War II: Battle of Iwo Jima; Vietnam War: Battle of Khe Sanh; Operation Allen Brook; Operation Mameluke Thrust; Operation Pipestone Canyon

The 1st Battalion, 26th Marines (1/26) is an inactive infantry battalion of the United States Marine Corps. They were part of the 26th Marine Regiment and 5th Marine Division and fought during the Battle of Iwo Jima in World War II. They were activated again for the Vietnam War but were deactivated after the war and remain inactive today.

== History ==
=== Vietnam War ===
On 1 March 1966 the 26th Marine Regiment was activated at Camp Pendleton initiating the formation of the 5th Marine Division. The 26th Marines moved to Okinawa in August. Until 4 October the battalion formed the battalion landing team (BLT) of the Special Landing Force (SLF). The battalion conducted Operation Deckhouse IV from 15 to 18 September. On 27 September the battalion was landed at Da Nang.

On 4 May 1967 the battalion was flown from Phu Bai to Khe Sanh Combat Base to support the Marines engaged in The Hill Fights. On 11 May the battalion took over responsibility for the area around Khe Sanh Combat Base from the 3rd Marines as Operation Crockett and the 3rd Battalion, 26th Marines was subsequently deployed to support them. The 26th Marines conducted Operation Ardmore a search and destroy mission in the Khe Sanh area from 17 July to 31 October. At the conclusion of Operation Ardmore the Marines commenced Operation Scotland, the defense of Khe Sanh Combat Base and search and destroy missions against People's Army of Vietnam (PAVN) infiltration.

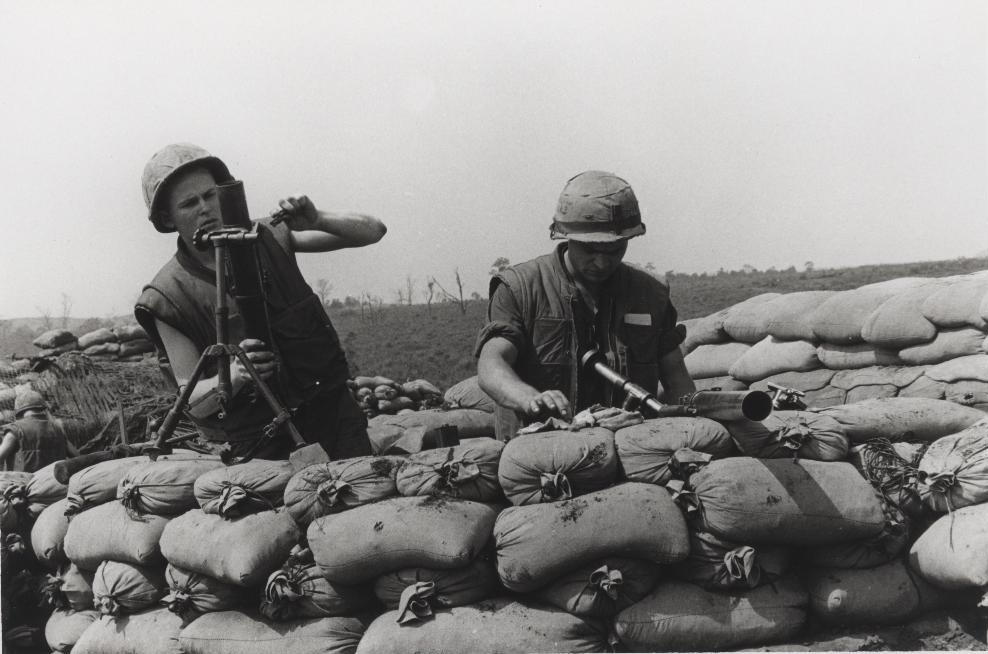
Company B, 1/26 Marines clean their 60mm mortars at Khe Sanh Combat Base

From 21 January 1968 the 26th Marines were under siege at Khe Sanh until the conclusion of Operation Pegasus on 14 April 1968 and were replaced by the 1st Marines on 15 April 1968 with the battalion flying to Quang Tri Combat Base. The 26th Marines was transferred from the operational control of the 3rd Marine Division to the 1st Marine Division on 18 May 1968. From 26 May to 6 June the battalion participated in Operation Allen Brook. The battalion then joined Operation Mameluke Thrust on 7 June. On 22 July the battalion was moved north to Phu Bai to replace the 5th Marine Regiment conducting Operation Houston. On the conclusion of Operation Houston on 12 September the 26th Marines were moved south to the Da Nang tactical area of responsibility (TAOR).

At the beginning of 1969 the battalion was responsible for security on the northern approaches to Da Nang including the Hải Vân Pass. On 1 April the battalion joined the SLF Alpha as the BLT. On 5 May SLF Alpha launched Operation Daring Rebel. From 26 May to 10 June the battalion participated in Operation Pipestone Canyon. On 27 June SLF Alpha launched Operation Bold Pursuit which continued until 6 July. From 10 to 20 July SLF Alpha conducted Operation Mighty Play. The battalion rejoined Operation Pipestone Canyon on 20 July. On 8 August the battalion reembarked on ships and on 7 September began Operation Defiant Stand which continued until 18 September. The battalion then ended its BLT duties and moved ashore replacing the 2nd Battalion, 26th Marines which became the BLT. On 21 September 1969 the 5th Marine Division was deactivated however the 26th Marines were assigned to the 1st Marine Division.

At the beginning of 1970 the 26th Marines were responsible for the defense of the northern and western approaches to Da Nang. The battalion had its command post on Hill 10 southwest of Da Nang with its TAOR directly below Charlie Ridge (15.936°N 108.095°E), a hill mass that projected from the Annamite Mountains that was frequently used by the VC for attacks on Da Nang. As part of Operation Keystone Bluejay the regiment stood down for deactivation in late February to early March with the 1st Marines taking over most of their tactical area of responsibility. On 6 March the 1st Battalion 1st Marines relieved the battalion. From 11 to 19 March 1970 the 26th Marine Regiment redeployed from South Vietnam and was inactivated.

== Notable former members ==
- Robert Hugo Dunlap, recipient of the Medal of Honor
- Jacklyn H. Lucas, recipient of the Medal of Honor
- Edward J. Miller, later Lieutenant general
- Bob Parsons, rifleman during the Vietnam War

== See also ==
- History of the United States Marine Corps
- List of United States Marine Corps battalions
