= Operation Crockett =

1967 American mission in the Vietnam War

- Part of the Vietnam War
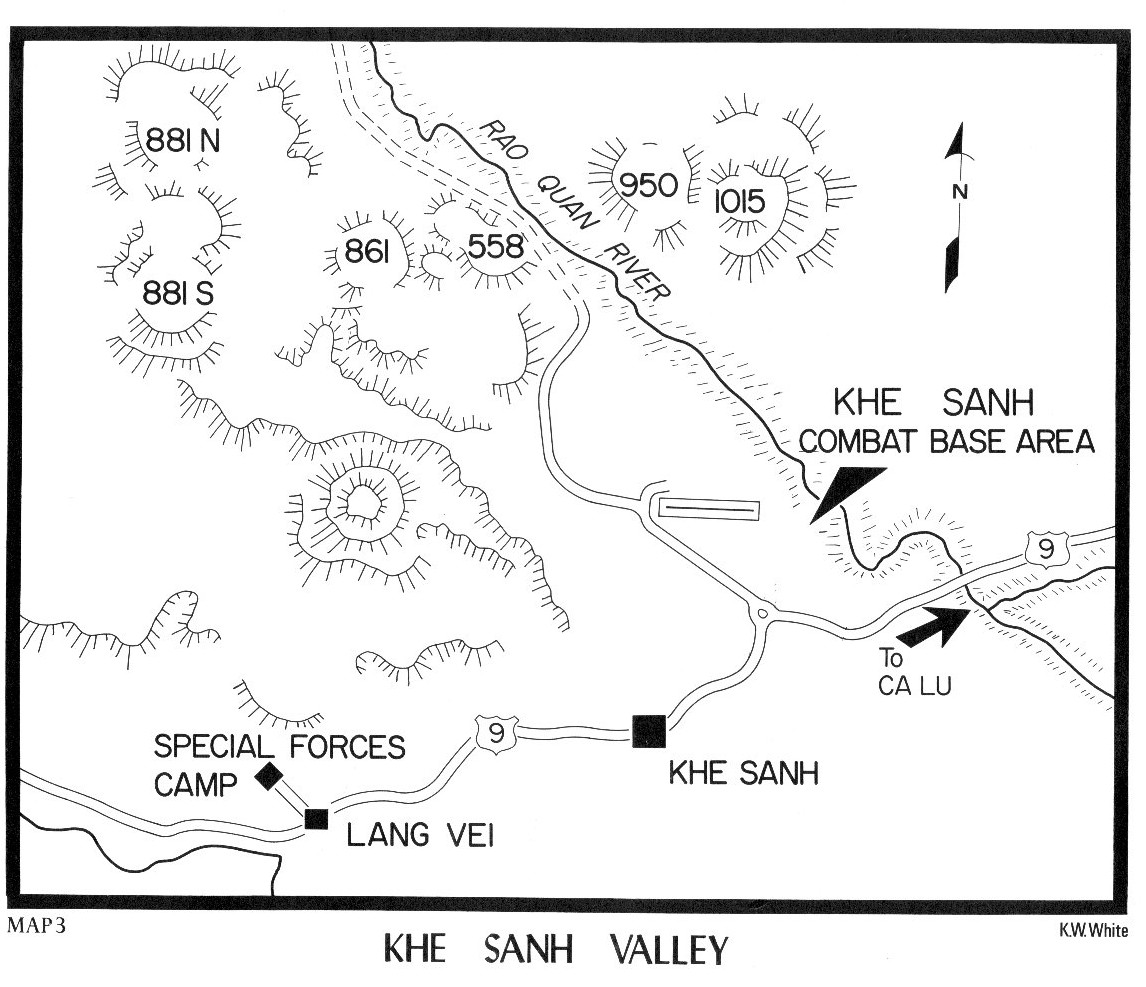
- Map showing location of hills around the Khe Sanh area
Date	13 May – 16 July 1967
Location	Near Khe Sanh, Quảng Trị Province, South Vietnam
Result	American victory

Belligerents
United States	North Vietnam

Commanders and leaders
Colonel John J . Padley	

Units involved
1st Battalion, 26th Marines; Company A, 3rd Reconnaissance Battalion; 3rd Battalion, 26th Marines	325C Division

Casualties and losses
34 killed	US body count: 111 killed 1 captured

Operation Crockett was an operation during the Vietnam War conducted by the United States Marine Corps against People's Army of Vietnam (PAVN) forces around Khe Sanh Combat Base in northwest Quảng Trị Province that took place from 13 May to 16 July 1967. The PAVN tested U.S. defenses, forcing the Marines to deploy additional forces to the area, following which the PAVN disengaged but did not withdraw from the area. The operation resulted in 111 PAVN killed and one captured for Marine losses of 34 killed. The operation was immediately followed by Operation Ardmore, an ongoing security operation.

== Background ==
Following the conclusion of The Hill Fights north of Khe Sanh Combat Base on 11 May, III Marine Amphibious Force commander Lieutenant General Lew Walt began reducing forces at Khe Sanh. From 11 to 13 May, the 1st Battalion, 26th Marines replaced the 2nd Battalion, 3rd Marines and the 3rd Battalion, 3rd Marines and at 15:00 on 13 May, Colonel John J. Padley, commanding officer of the 26th Marine Regiment, assumed responsibility for Khe Sanh.

The mission assigned to Padley's Marines was to occupy key terrain, deny enemy access into the vital areas, conduct aggressive patrolling in order to detect and destroy enemy elements within the Tactical area of responsibility (TAOR) and provide security for the base and adjacent outposts. Padley was to support the Special Forces Camp at Lang Vei (16.600°N 106.668°E) with his organic artillery, as well as to coordinate all activities of allied units operating in the area. The code name for Marine operations in the Khe Sanh TAOR was Operation Crockett.

== Operation ==
To accomplish the mission, the 1/26th Marines, commanded by Lieutenant colonel Donald E. Newton, stationed one company each on Hill 881S (16°40′18″N 106°39′45.2″E) and 861 (16°40′36″N 106°41′13″E); a security detachment at the radio relay site on Hill 950; and the remainder of the battalion at the base, acting both as base security and battalion reserve. The units at the company outposts patrolled continuously within a 4,000-meter radius of their positions. Company A, 3rd Reconnaissance Battalion, operating from Khe Sanh, inserted reconnaissance teams at greater ranges to provide long-range surveillance. Although numerous sightings and reports indicated that all three regiments of the PAVN 325C Division were still in the tri-border region, there was only occasional contact during May.

As June began, there was a sharp increase in the number of sightings throughout the Crockett TAOR. At 01:01 6 June, 25 120 mm mortar rounds and 102 mm rockets hit Khe Sanh Combat Base. One hour later Hill 950 came under attack from the west and northeast by an unknown number of PAVN. The PAVN penetrated the position, but the defending Marines quickly forced them to withdraw, leaving 10 dead, one wounded and seven weapons. Marine losses in the action were six killed and two wounded.

On the afternoon of 7 June mortar and small-arms fire hit a patrol from Company B, approximately 2,000 meters west of Hill 881S. The mortar attack immediately preceded an assault by about 40 PAVN troops. The Marines repulsed the PAVN attack and called artillery in on the attackers. A platoon from Company A arrived by helicopter to help. By 16:30, when the PAVN withdrew, the two Marine units had killed 66 PAVN and lost 18 Marines killed and 28 wounded. On 9 June the PAVN shot down a UH-1E gunship in the same area, killing the pilot and wounding the copilot. Friendly forces rescued the copilot and two crew members, but the helicopter had to be destroyed.

Due to the increasing number of contacts, Lieutenant colonel Kurt L. Hoch's 3rd Battalion, 26th Marines returned to the operational control of the 26th Marines (Forward) at Khe Sanh; the battalion arrived at Khe Sanh on the 13th. During the two weeks after the 3rd Battalion's arrival, both Marine battalions had many contacts with isolated PAVN forces throughout the TAOR.

In the early morning of 27 June, 50 82 mm mortar rounds hit Khe Sanh Combat Base, killing nine Marines and wounded 125. Another attack occurred at 05:25 by 50 102 mm rockets killing one Marine and wounding 14. The Marines' artillery answered both attacks with unknown results. At 12:30, Company I, 26th Marines, while searching for a suspected mortar position to the west of the base, ran into two PAVN companies. Company L landed by helicopter to reinforce the engaged Marines. By 19:00 the PAVN broke contact and withdrew to the northwest leaving 35 bodies on the battlefield. This was the last significant action during June.

During the July period of the operation there was a gradual increase in the number of sightings, but only occasional contact.

== Aftermath ==
The operation concluded on 16 July. It was clear that the PAVN intended to remain in the Khe Sanh area. The 26th Marine Regiment subsequently conducted Operation Ardmore in the same area from 17 July to 31 October 1967.
