= VMM-165 =

Marine Medium Tilt Rotor Squadron 165
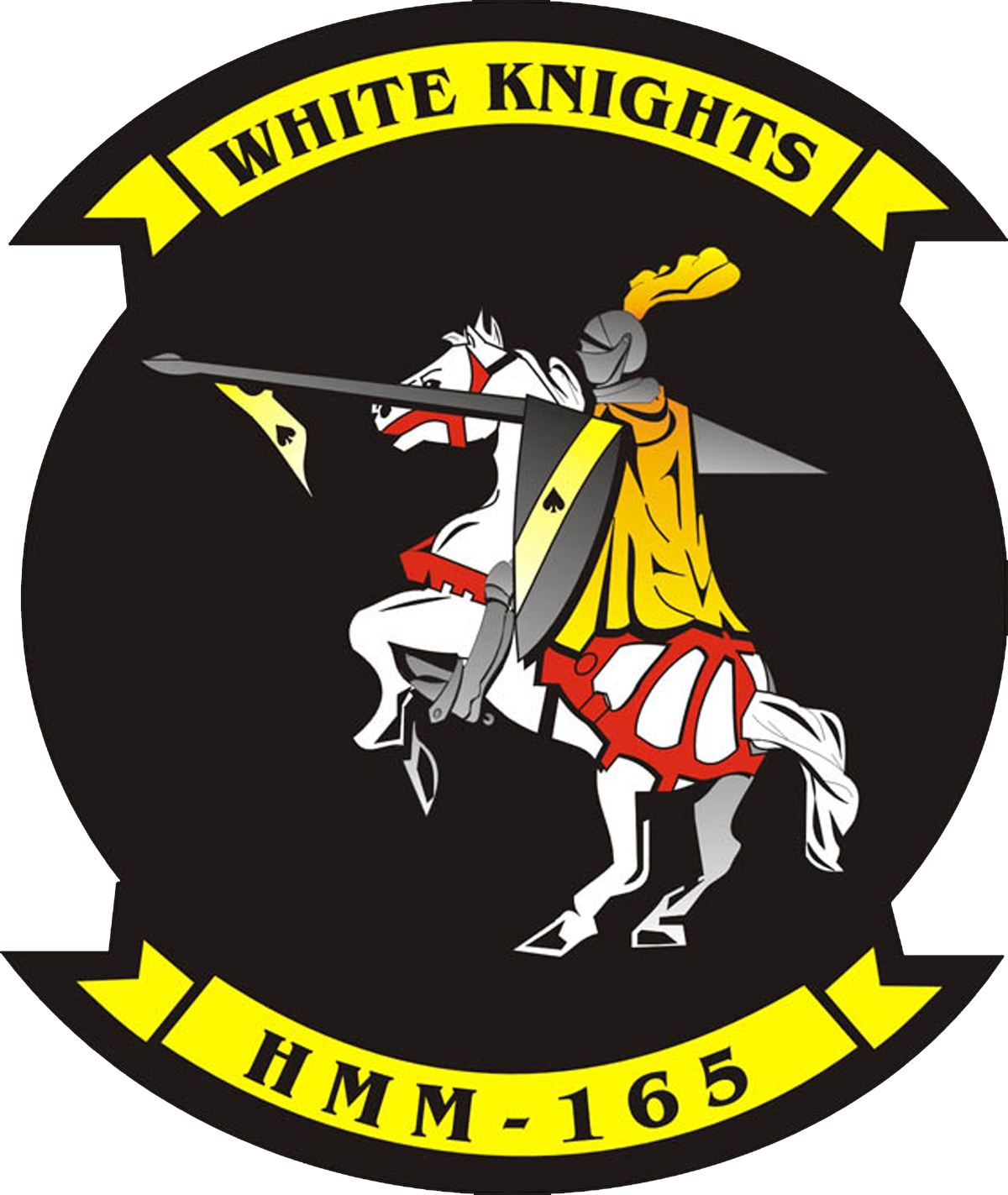
- HMM-165's insignia
- Founded: 1 July 1965
- Country: United States
- Branch: United States Marine Corps
- Type: Medium lift tilt rotor squadron
- Role: Assault support
- Part of: Marine Aircraft Group 16; 3rd Marine Aircraft Wing
- Garrison/HQ: Marine Corps Air Station Miramar
- Nicknames: "White Knights" "Lady Ace"
- Motto: Whatever it Takes
- Tail Code: YW
- Engagements: Vietnam War; Operation Desert Storm; Operation Enduring Freedom; Operation Iraqi Freedom * 2003 invasion of Iraq; *Operation Inherent Resolve

Marine Medium Tilt Rotor Squadron 165 (VMM-165) is a United States Marine Corps Tilt-rotor squadron consisting of MV-22B Osprey transport aircraft. The squadron, known as the "White Knights", is based at Marine Corps Air Station Miramar, California and fall under the command of Marine Aircraft Group 16 (MAG-16) and the 3rd Marine Aircraft Wing (3rd MAW).

== Mission ==
Provide assault support transport of combat troops, supplies and equipment during expeditionary, joint or combined operations. Be prepared for short-notice, worldwide employment in support of Marine Air-Ground Task Force operations.

== History ==
=== Vietnam War ===
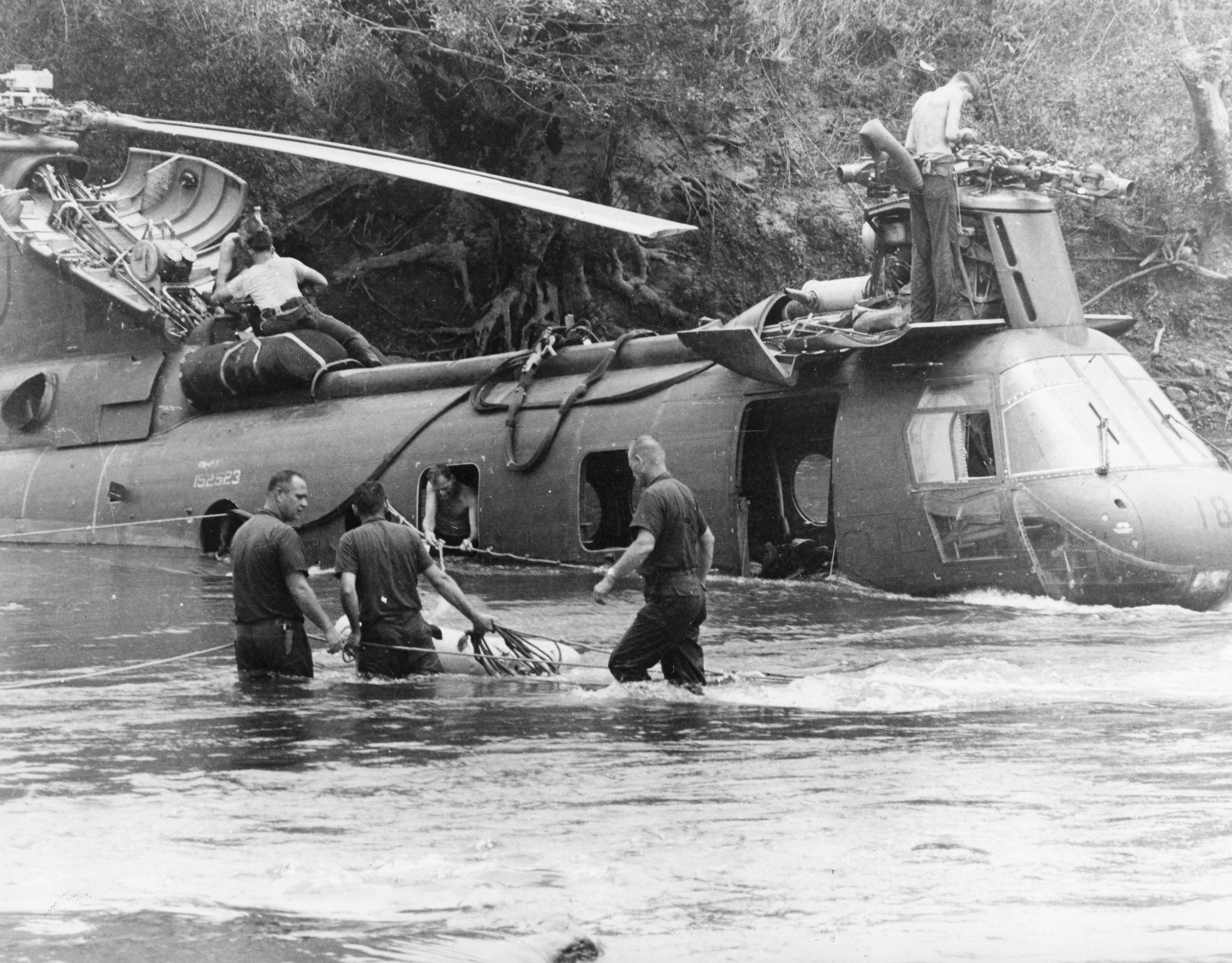
HMM-165 CH-46 is prepared for retrieval near Chu Lai, 12 March 1967

Marine Medium Helicopter Squadron 165 was activated on 1 July 1965 at Marine Corps Air Station Santa Ana, California as part of Marine Aircraft Group 36 (MAG-36), 3rd Marine Aircraft Wing. During August 1965, the squadron was reassigned to Marine Wing Service Group 37.

In July 1966 the squadron supported Operation Hastings. The squadron was assigned to MAG-36 at Kỳ Hà in October.

On 3 June 1967 a squadron CH-46A #150955 was shot down just after having extracted a Military Assistance Command, Vietnam – Studies and Observations Group Hatchet Force in eastern Laos. Two crewmen were killed and two captured, with one dying in captivity, gunner Corporal Frank Cius, was released on 5 March 1973 as part of Operation Homecoming. Two U.S. members of the Hatchet Force and an unknown number of Nùngs were killed in the crash and subsequent fighting, Sergeant first class Charles Wilklow escaped captivity and was rescued five days later. In August the squadron supported Operation Cochise. In November the squadron moved from Kỳ Hà to Phu Bai Combat Base joining the rest of MAG-36 there.

From 10 January to 18 February 1968 the squadron served on USS Valley Forge as the Special Landing Force (SLF) Bravo helicopter squadron. During this time they supported Operation Badger Catch. The squadron supported US and South Vietnamese forces fighting in the Battle of Huế, flying in Army of the Republic of Vietnam (ARVN) reinforcements into the Mang Ca Garrison on 1 February. On 6 June a squadron CH-46A #152533 was shot down at LZ Loon, southeast of Khe Sanh Combat Base, resulting in 13 U.S. killed. On 1 September the squadron transferred to SLF Bravo again onboard USS Tripoli. On 28 December the squadron was transferred to Marine Aircraft Group 16 (MAG-16) at Marble Mountain Air Facility. In December the squadron supported Operation Taylor Common.

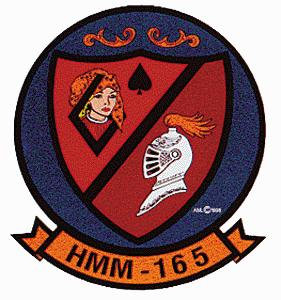
Vietnam-era squadron insignia

On 5 January 1969 the squadron moved onboard USS Tripoli as the SLF Bravo helicopter squadron. In late January the squadron supported Operation Linn River. In March the squadron supported Operation Oklahoma Hills. In mid-June the squadron was advised that it would be redeployed to Okinawa. On 14 August the squadron boarded the Valley Forge and departed South Vietnam. On Okinawa the squadron was reassigned to Marine Aircraft Group 15 of the 9th Marine Amphibious Brigade at Marine Corps Air Station Futenma. On 7 November the squadron was reassigned to MAG-36. In December the squadron was embarked on ships as the Amphibious Ready Group Alpha helicopter squadron.

In early 1971 the squadron was assigned to the 31st Marine Amphibious Unit (31st MAU). In mid-January the squadron supported the ARVN in Operation Cuu Long 44/02, flying support missions into Phú Quốc. On 1 February the 31st MAU which was then at U.S. Naval Base Subic Bay was ordered to embark on board ships for deployment off the Vietnamese coast. The squadron operated from USS Iwo Jima as the 31st MAU conducted amphibious operations east of Vinh from 11 February to 6 March in an attempt to distract North Vietnamese forces from Operation Lam Son 719.

On 27 June 1972 the squadron, operating from USS Tripoli, conducted feint air assault operations in support of the ARVN Operation Lam Son 72. On 29 June the squadron transported South Vietnamese Marines into landing zones east of Quảng Trị. On 11 July the squadron again transported the Marines into landing zones 2 km north of Quảng Trị. From 22 July to 13 August the squadron took part in Philippine flood relief operations, flying in food and supplies to local populations. On 9 September the squadron again conducted a feint air assault in support of the final South Vietnamese assault on the Quảng Trị Citadel. In late 1972 the squadron was designated as a mine-sweeping support squadron with three CH-53s from HMH-462, two UH-1s and five CH-46s on the USS New Orleans.

In early February 1973 the composite squadron was deployed on board the New Orleans and left Subic Bay for the North Vietnamese coast to commence Operation End Sweep arriving off Haiphong on 23 February. On 17 April minesweeping operations were suspended and the task force withdrawn due to North Vietnamese delays in the handover of prisoners. On 20 April the squadron moved to USS Tripoli. Minesweeping operations recommenced on 18 June and were completed by 4 July when the task force returned to Subic Bay.

In March with the deteriorating situation in South Vietnam caused by the North Vietnamese 1975 spring offensive, U.S. forces began making preparations for the evacuation of U.S. civilians and "at-risk" South Vietnamese. On 28 March 1975 the squadron was again assigned to the 31st MAU, however as no amphibious assault ship was available the squadron was initially split into four separate detachments and divided among the available ships, seven CH-46s were placed on board the USS Dubuque, two UH-1Es went on board the USS Blue Ridge and one CH-46 joined both the USS Durham and the USS Frederick. From early April squadron helicopters began daily reconnaissance flights along the South Vietnamese coast. On 5 April a squadron helicopter located the data recorder from the C-5 Galaxy that had crashed the previous day. From 29 to 30 April the squadron participated in Operation Frequent Wind, the evacuation of Saigon. At 04:58 on 30 April, under direct orders from President Gerald Ford, squadron CH-46 Lady Ace 09 evacuated U.S. Ambassador Graham Martin from the US Embassy, Saigon.

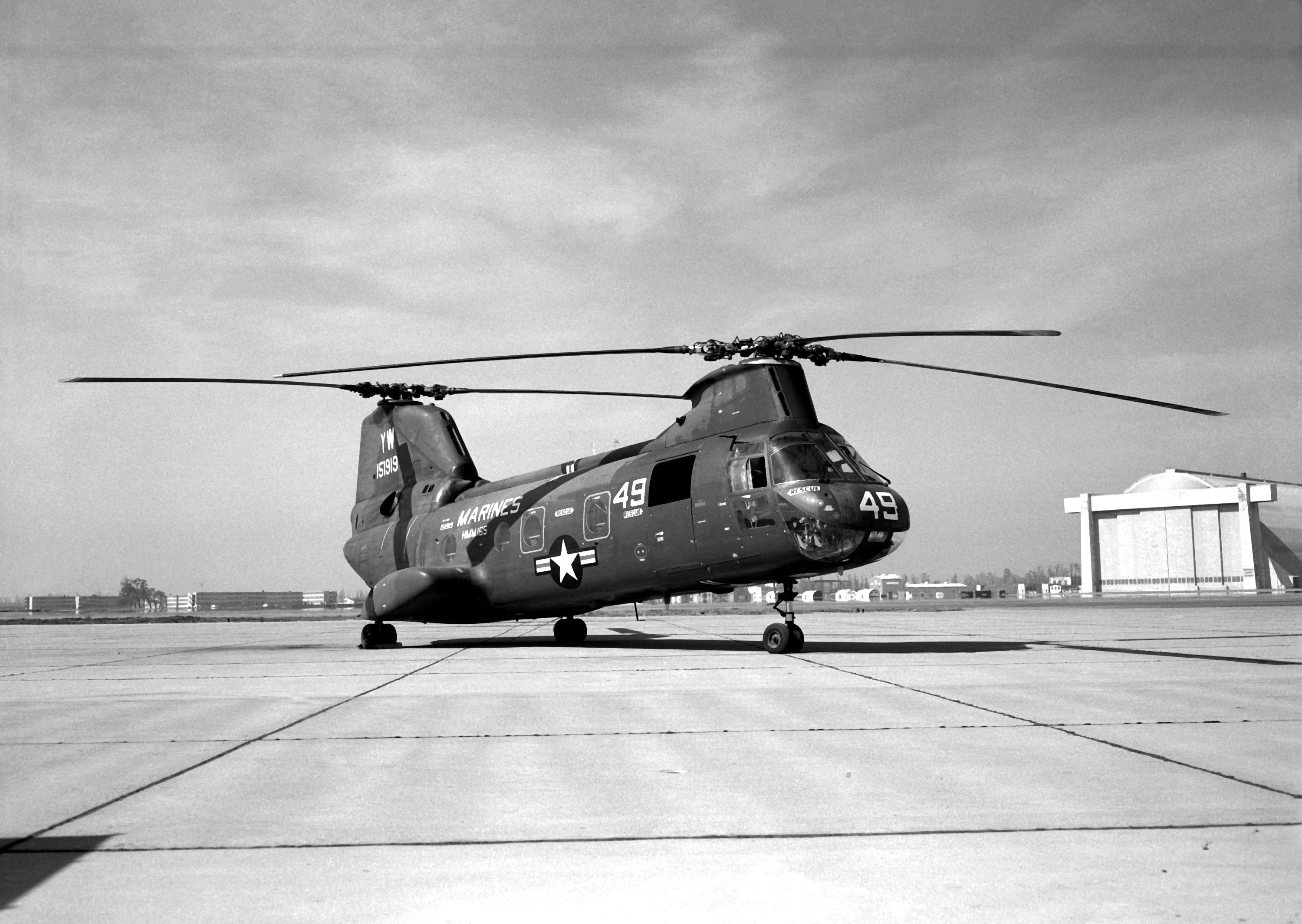
A CH-46 in front of an old blimp hangar at Marine Corps Air Station Tustin.

=== Post Vietnam and the 1980s ===
In November 1977, the White Knights moved to Marine Corps Air Station Kaneohe Bay, Hawaii where they were reassigned to Marine Aircraft Group 24, the air combat element of the 1st Marine Brigade. At this time the name of the squadron was changed from White Knights to Hawaiian Warriors. The logo on the tail of the aircraft was changed from a traditional knight to that of a profile of a Hawaiian king that resembled the logo of Primo beer, causing the squadron enlisted to refer to themselves as, The Primo Warriors: .

In December 1979 at a time of high international tension arising from the Iran hostage crisis and the Soviet invasion of Afghanistan, HMM-165 deployed to the Arabian Sea with the 31st Marine Amphibious Unit (31st MAU) on board USS Okinawa. Their mission was to deter Soviet aggression under the orders of then President Jimmy Carter. This policy would later be named the Carter Doctrine. At the same time, the squadron served in a minor support role for the Hostage Rescue Attempt in Iran.

Upon returning to Hawaii in June 1980, the following winter produced a severe storm that damaged electrical lines crossing Oahu and HMM-165 assisted local officials in replacing these downed lines.

In 1981, HMM-165 was again deployed to the Western Pacific and Arabian Sea with the 31st MAU on board USS Belleau Wood. Their name changed back to The White Knights and replaced the tail insignia with a traditional White Knight helmet. HMM-165 performed humanitarian work assisting the government of Sri Lanka in delivering television transmitters to a remote site providing the people of Sri Lanka full national coverage of their television station for the first time.

During April 1983 HMM-165 became the Air Combat Element (ACE) of the 31st Marine Amphibious Unit. The squadron was reinforced with 2 UH-1s, 4 AH-1s, 4 CH-53s, and 6 AV-8s in addition to its 12 CH-46s and was redesignated as HMM(C)Rein-165. The squadron deployed to the western Pacific and Indian Oceans and completed contingency operations in the Okinawa, Philippines, Thailand, Malaysia, Kenya, and Somalia. The reinforced squadron was diverted to Beirut, Lebanon, where they conducted contingency operations in Lebanon, Cyprus, and Israel from the deck of USS Tarawa. The squadron returned to Kaneohe Bay in time for Christmas. In December 1989, the White Knights supported American interests, to include reinforcement of the American Embassy, in the Republic of the Philippines during that country's coupe attempt.

=== Gulf War & the 1990s ===
In August 1990, the squadron was sent to Saudi Arabia to participate in Operation Desert Shield and Operation Desert Storm. The White Knights returned home from Saudi Arabia in March 1991. HMM-165 was the "last squadron in the Philippine Islands" when they supported the special purpose MAGTF from July to November 1992. From September to October 1992 a detachment was sent to Cambodia to participate in Joint Task Force Full Accounting. The squadron aided the task force in the search for remains of MIA's from the war in Vietnam. In March 1993, another detachment from HMM-165 was sent to Cambodia to participate in Joint Task Force Full Accounting; this time the mission was cut short when the task force base camp was attacked by mortar fire in April 1993.

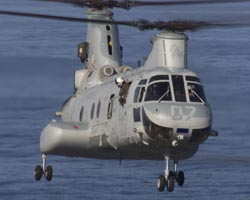
CH-46E

As a result of the Base Realignment And Closure Committee's (BRAC) actions HMM-165 was reassigned from the 1st Marine Aircraft Wing Aviation Support Element, Marine Corps Base Hawaii, to Marine Aircraft Group 16, 3rd Marine Aircraft Wing, Marine Corps Air Station El Toro, California on 15 May 1996.

HMM-165 moved to MCAS Miramar, San Diego, California in November 1998 as the result of additional BRAC requirements. In December 1998 HMM-165 was designated the Aviation Combat Element for the 11th Marine Expeditionary Unit.

=== Global War on Terror ===
In July 2001, HMM-165 was designated the Aviation Combat Element for the 13th Marine Expeditionary Unit. After the terror attacks of September 11, 2001, HMM-165 deployed in support of Operation Enduring Freedom in Afghanistan.

The White Knights received orders to deploy to Iraq in December 2002. Beginning in January, HMM-165 deployed on USS Boxer and cruised to the Persian Gulf. After offloading in Kuwait, the squadron was tasked with supporting Regimental Combat Team 1 (RCT-1) for the duration of Operation Iraqi Freedom. On the night of 1 April 2003, HMM-165 comprised the CH-46 element of Task Force 20, the special team that extracted prisoner of war Army PFC Jessica Lynch.

The squadron redeployed to Iraq in September 2006 attached to the 15th Marine Expeditionary Unit. On 3 December 2006 a helicopter carrying 16 personnel made an emergency landing on Lake Qadisiyah in Al Anbar Province. Four of the passengers drowned in the incident. They returned to Camp Pendleton on 30 May 2007.

In June 2010, the unit again sailed with the 15th MEU aboard USS Peleliu, marking the last deployment of its CH-46s. The squadron demonstrated its prowess in a wide variety of missions as the White Knights headed up Task Force Ghazi in Khyber, Pakhtunkhwa Province, Northern Pakistan and Task Force South in the Sindh Province, Southern Pakistan in support of Humanitarian Assistance / Disaster Relief operations.

HMM-165 transitioned to the V-22 Osprey on 1 March 2011 and were subsequently re-designated Marine Medium Tiltrotor Squadron 165 (VMM-165). On 6 October 2012, a MV-22 Osprey tilt-rotor aircraft from squadron VMM-165 land and refueled on board USS Nimitz. This operation was part of an evaluation of the feasibility of the MV-22 as a potential replacement for the C-2 Greyhound carrier onboard delivery (COD) cargo transport aircraft.

In July 2013, VMM-165 deployed to Afghanistan in support of Operation Enduring Freedom. Upon arriving at Camp Bastion, Afghanistan, the squadron assumed the duties of assault support for Regional Command Southwest [RC(SW)]. During their seven-month deployment to Afghanistan, the White Knights of VMM-165 conducted assault support, battlefield illumination, VIP transport, and CASEVAC in support of the International Security Assistance Force (ISAF) effort in Helmand Province.

== Unit awards ==
A unit citation or commendation is an award bestowed upon an organization for the action cited. Members of the unit who participated in said actions are allowed to wear on their uniforms the awarded unit citation. VMM-165 has been presented with the following awards:

Streamer	Award	Year(s)	Additional Info
	Presidential Unit Citation Streamer with one Bronze Star	1966–1967, 1968, 2003	Vietnam War, Iraq
	Navy Unit Commendation Streamer with three Bronze Stars	1968, 1968, 1969, 1972	Vietnam War
	Meritorious Unit Commendation Streamer with three Bronze Stars	1972, 1975	Vietnam War
	National Defense Service Streamer with two Bronze Stars	1961–1974, 1990–1995, 2001–present	Vietnam War, Gulf War, War on Terrorism
	Armed Forces Expeditionary Streamer		Somalia
	Vietnam Service Streamer with two Silver and three Bronze Stars	July 1965 - April 1971, April - December 1975	
	Southwest Asia Service Streamer	September 1990 - February 1991	Desert Shield, Desert Storm
	Iraq Campaign Streamer		January - July 2003, March - April 2005, November 2006 - April 2007
	Afghanistan Campaign Streamer with one Bronze Star		August 2013 - February 2014
	Global War on Terrorism Expeditionary Streamer	March - May 2003, April - October 2015	Operation Inherent Resolve
	Global War on Terrorism Service Streamer	2001–present	
	Vietnam Gallantry Cross with Palm Streamer		

== See also ==
- List of active United States Marine Corps aircraft squadrons
- United States Marine Corps Aviation
