= William R. Prom =

William Raymond Prom
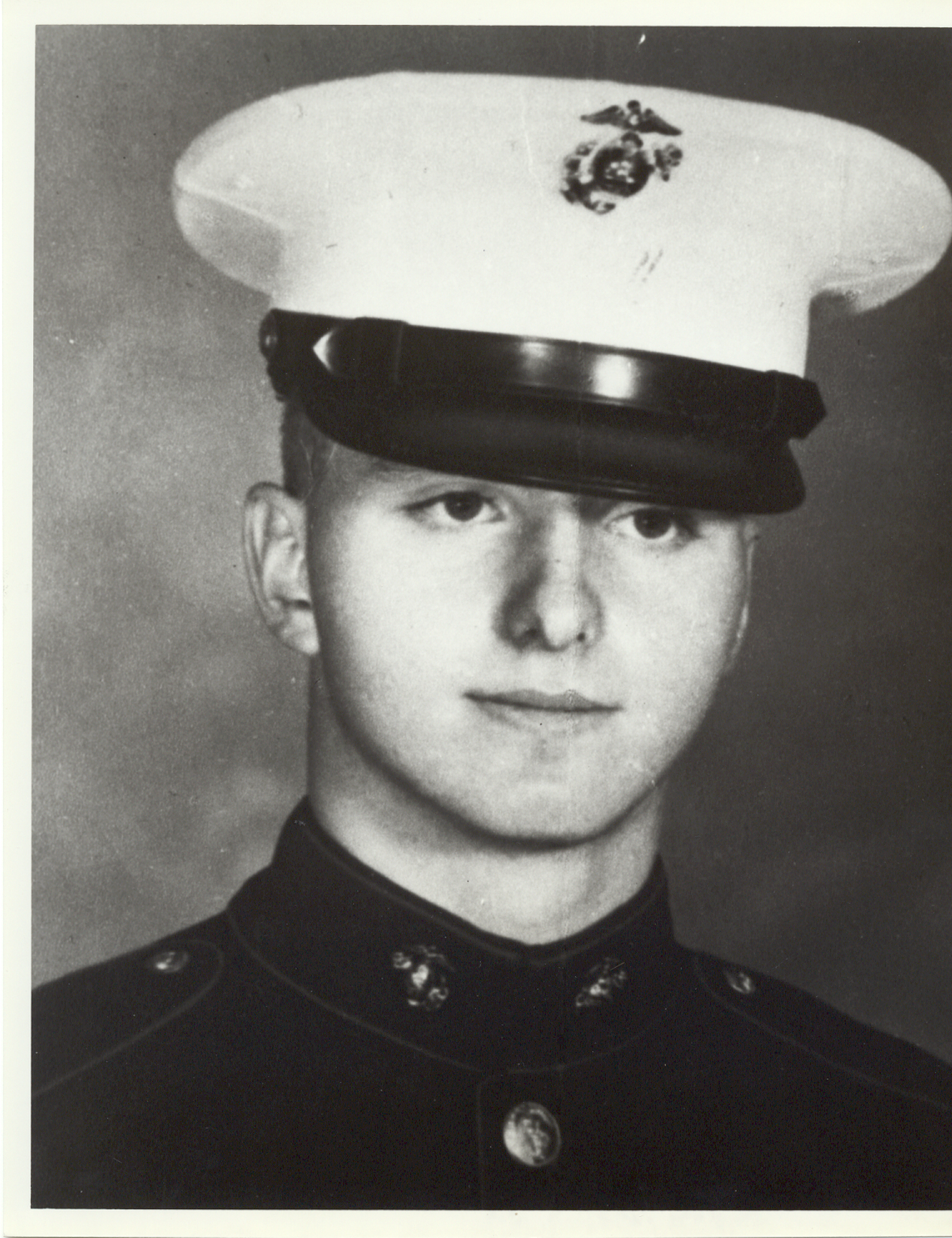
- William R. Prom, posthumous Medal of Honor recipient
- Born: November 17, 1948; Pittsburgh, Pennsylvania, U.S.
- Died: February 9, 1969 (aged 20) near An Hoa Combat Base, Quang Nam Province, South Vietnam
- Burial place: Allegheny County Memorial Park, Allison Park, Pennsylvania
- Military career
- Allegiance: United States of America
- Branch: United States Marine Corps
- Service years: 1967–1969
- Rank: Lance Corporal
- Units: Company I, 3rd Battalion 3rd Marines, 3rd Marine Division
- Conflicts: Vietnam War: Operation Taylor Common †
- Awards: Medal of Honor; Purple Heart

William Raymond Prom (November 17, 1948 – February 9, 1969) was a United States Marine who posthumously received the Medal of Honor for heroism in February 1969 during the Vietnam War.

== Biography ==
William Raymond Prom was born on November 17, 1948, in Pittsburgh, Pennsylvania. He attended Mt. Troy Public School in Pittsburgh and Millvale High School in Millvale, Pennsylvania.

Prom enlisted in the U.S. Marine Corps Reserve at Pittsburgh on December 8, 1967, and was discharged to enlist in the Regular Marine Corps on December 27, 1967.

Upon completion of recruit training with the 3rd Recruit Training Battalion, Marine Corps Recruit Depot Parris Island, South Carolina, he was promoted to private first class on March 1, 1968. Transferred to the Marine Corps Base Camp Lejeune, North Carolina, he underwent individual combat training with the 2nd Infantry Training Regiment, and weapons special training with the 1st Battalion, 1st Infantry Training Regiment, completing the latter in April 1968.

In June 1968, he arrived in the Republic of Vietnam, where he served consecutively as ammunition man, assistant gunner, machine gun team leader, and machine gun squad leader, with Company I, 3rd Battalion, 3rd Marines, 3rd Marine Division. He was promoted to Lance Corporal on September 1, 1968. While participating in Operation Taylor Common during a reconnaissance in force operation southwest of An Hoa Combat Base on February 9, 1969, he was killed in action.

William R. Prom is buried in Allegheny County Memorial Park in Allison Park, Pennsylvania.

== Decorations ==
A complete list of his medals and decorations include: the Medal of Honor, the Purple Heart, the National Defense Service Medal, the Vietnam Service Medal, and the Republic of Vietnam Campaign Medal.

Medal of Honor		Purple Heart
National Defense Service Medal	Vietnam Service Medal	Republic of Vietnam Campaign Medal

== Medal of Honor citation ==
The President of the United States in the name of Congress takes pride in presenting the MEDAL OF HONOR posthumously to

LANCE CORPORAL WILLIAM R. PROM
UNITED STATES MARINE CORPS

for service as set forth in the following CITATION:

For conspicuous gallantry and intrepidity at the risk of his life above and beyond the call of duty while serving as a Machine Gun Squad Leader with Company I, Third Battalion, Third Marines, Third Marine Division in action against the enemy in the Republic of Vietnam. While returning from a reconnaissance operation on 9 February 1969 during Operation TAYLOR COMMON, two platoons of Company I came under an intense automatic weapons fire and grenade attack from a well-concealed North Vietnamese Army force in fortified positions. The leading element of the platoon was isolated and several Marines were wounded. Lance Corporal Prom immediately assumed control of one of the machine guns and began to deliver return fire. Disregarding his own safety he advanced to a position from which he could more effectively deliver covering fire while first aid was administered to the wounded men. Realizing that the enemy would have to be destroyed before the injured Marines could be evacuated, Lance Corporal Prom again moved and delivered a heavy volume of fire with such accuracy that he was instrumental in routing the enemy, thus permitting his men to regroup and resume the march. Shortly thereafter, the platoon again came under heavy fire in which one man was critically wounded. Reacting instantly Lance Corporal Prom moved forward to protect his injured comrade. Unable to continue his own fire because of his severe wounds, he continued to advance to within a few yards of the enemy positions. There, standing in full view of the enemy, he accurately directed the fire of his support elements until he was mortally wounded. Inspired by his heroic actions, the Marines launched an assault that destroyed the enemy. Lance Corporal Prom's indomitable courage inspiring initiative and selfless devotion to duty upheld the highest traditions of the Marine Corps and the United States Naval Service. He gallantly gave his life for his country.

/S/ RICHARD M. NIXON

== In memory ==
The name William R. Prom is inscribed on the Vietnam Veterans Memorial ("The Wall") on Panel 32W Row 002.

The 31st Street Bridge over the Allegheny River in Pittsburgh, PA, is the William Randolph Prom Memorial Bridge.

== See also ==
- List of Medal of Honor recipients
