= 13th Marine Regiment (United States) =

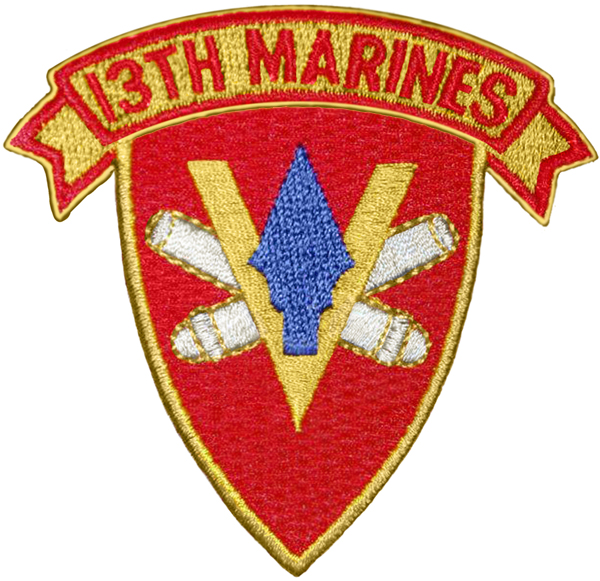
- 13th Marine Regiment insignia
- Active: July 3, 1918 – August 15, 1919, December 10, 1944 – January 12, 1946 June 1, 1966 – October 15, 1969
- Country: United States of America
- Branch: United States Marine Corps
- Type: Infantry (1916–19); Artillery (1943–46; 1966–69)
- Part of: 5th Marine Division
- Garrison/HQ: Decommissioned
- Engagements: World War II: Battle of Iwo Jima; Vietnam War: Battle of Khe Sanh; Battle of Kham Duc; Operation Taylor Common

Commanders
- Notable commanders: Major General Smedley Butler

The 13th Marine Regiment (13th Marines) was an artillery regiment of the United States Marine Corps. The regiment was activated for service three times during the 20th century when the Marine Corps expanded to meet war time requirements. Originally activated as an infantry regiment during World War I, the unit arrived in France before the war ended but did not participate in combat operations. It was reactivated for service in World War II as the artillery regiment for the 5th Marine Division. The unit saw intense combat during the Battle of Iwo Jima, participated in occupation duty in Japan and was quickly decommissioned shortly after the war. The regiment was last activated during the Vietnam War to again provide fire support for 5th Marine Division regiments supporting operations in South Vietnam. The regiment was finally deactivated on April 30, 1970, as the Marine Corps began to draw down its force structure at the conclusion of the Vietnam War.

== Organization ==
Battalion
Headquarters and Service Battalion 15th Marines (H&S 13)
1st Battalion, 13th Marines (1/13)
2nd Battalion, 13th Marines (2/13)
3rd Battalion, 13th Marines (3/13)
4th Battalion, 13th Marines (4/13)

== History ==
=== World War I ===
The 13th Marines was formed on July 3, 1916, as an infantry regiment. Assigned to the 5th Marine Brigade, the regiment arrived in France on September 25, 1918, and served in the vicinity of Brest."A Brief History of U.S. Marine Corps Action in Europe During World War I". www.worldwar1centennial.org. United States Foundation for the Commemoration of the World Wars. After the war the regiment was deactivated on August 15, 1919.

=== World War II ===
On December 10, 1943, the regiment was reactivated at Marine Corps Base Camp Pendleton, California as an artillery unit underneath the 5th Marine Division. Training continued at Camp Pendleton through the summer of 1944 which culminated in simulated amphibious landings on San Clemente Island. The 13th Marines departed San Diego in August 1944 sailing for Hawaii. Upon arrival they were housed at Camp Tarawa on Hawaiʻi Island. While at Tarawa the Division continued to train and incorporate lessons learned from each new amphibious landing that took place in the Pacific.

==== Iwo Jima ====
The four battalions of the 13th Marines, under the command of Colonel James D. Waller, took part in the Battle of Iwo Jima. Reconnaissance parties and forward observers for the regiment came ashore at Red Beach 2, 1500 yards north of Mount Suribachi in the 5th wave at 0922 on D-Day to scout out artillery positions before the battalions arrived. At that time, most of the positions that had initially been identified were still in enemy hands. At 0935 the Japanese opened their vicious attack of machine guns, mortars and artillery. 3/13 came ashore first on the southern beaches at 1400, followed by 2/13 at 1430, 1/13 at 1645 and 4/13 at 1930. Early on the morning of February 21, 1/13 and 2/13 dispersed an enemy counterattack that had been building up in front of the 1st Battalion, 27th Marines.

The 105mm howitzers from 3/13 were in direct support of the 28th Marine Regiment as it wheeled south on the morning of February 21 to secure Mount Suribachi. On the evening of February 28 at 0215 in the morning the 5th Marine Division ammunition dump was hit causing a massive explosion and subsequent fire. Marines from H&S Battery, 13th Marines and the 5th Engineer Battalion were responsible for eventually getting the blaze under control. As the end of the battle neared many of the infantry battalions were critically low on personnel. Marines from H&S Battery and 1/13 and 2/13 were provided to the 28th Marine Regiment to help serve as replacements for the infantry battalions.

The regiment participated in the occupation of southern Japan and in particular Kyushu for several months.

Upon returning from overseas the regiment was again placed in an inactive status on January 12, 1946.

=== Vietnam War ===
The 13th Marines were reactivated on May 1, 1966, for service during the Vietnam War. In August 1966, the 13th Marine Regiment was deployed to South Vietnam. Battery "A" 1–13 participated in amphibious operations as part of Special Landing Force (SLF) 26 and later BLT 1–26 in support of the 1st Battalion, 26th Marines

== Insignia ==
The insignia of the 13th Marine Regiment is that of the 5th Marine Division, differenced by adjusting the charges to surmount crossed artillery cannons all below a banner of gold inscribed "THIRTEENTH MARINES" of scarlet and a 1936-type Marine Corps emblem of gold in the chief (top) of the shield.

== Unit awards ==
A unit citation or commendation is an award bestowed upon an organization for the action cited. Members of the unit who participated in said actions are allowed to wear on their uniforms the awarded unit citation. The 13th Marine Regiment has been presented with the following awards:

Streamer	Award	Year(s)	Additional Info
	Navy Unit Commendation Streamer	1945	Iwo Jima
	World War I Victory Streamer w/ Bronze Maltese Cross	Jul 3 – Sep 23, 1918, Sep 24 – Nov 11, 1918	General Service, France
	Asiatic-Pacific Campaign Streamer with one Bronze Star	1945	Iwo Jima
	World War II Victory Streamer	1941–1945	Pacific War
	Navy Occupation Service Streamer with "ASIA" Clasp	Sep 22 – Dec 7, 1945	Japan
	National Defense Service Streamer	1966–69	Vietnam War
	Vietnam Service Streamer with three Bronze Stars	Feb 21 – Apr 1, 1968, Apr 2 – Jun 30, 1968, Jul 1 – Sep 12, 1968	Tet, Counteroffensive Phase IV, Counteroffensive Phase V
