= Robert L. Nichols =

American military officer

- Born: February 9, 1922; Providence, Rhode Island, U.S.
- Died: July 4, 2001 (aged 79); Encampment, Wyoming, U.S.
- Burial place: Arlington National Cemetery
- Military career
- Allegiance: United States
- Branch: United States Marine Corps
- Service years: 1939–1978
- Rank: Lieutenant general
- Commands: Deputy Chief of Staff for Manpower; Fleet Marine Force, Atlantic

Robert L. Nichols (February 9, 1922 – July 4, 2001) was a lieutenant general in the United States Marine Corps who served as Deputy Chief of Staff for Manpower. He was commissioned in 1944 after enlisting in 1939 and retired in 1978.
