= Operation Taylor Common =

Part of the Vietnam War (1968–1969)

- Part of the Vietnam War
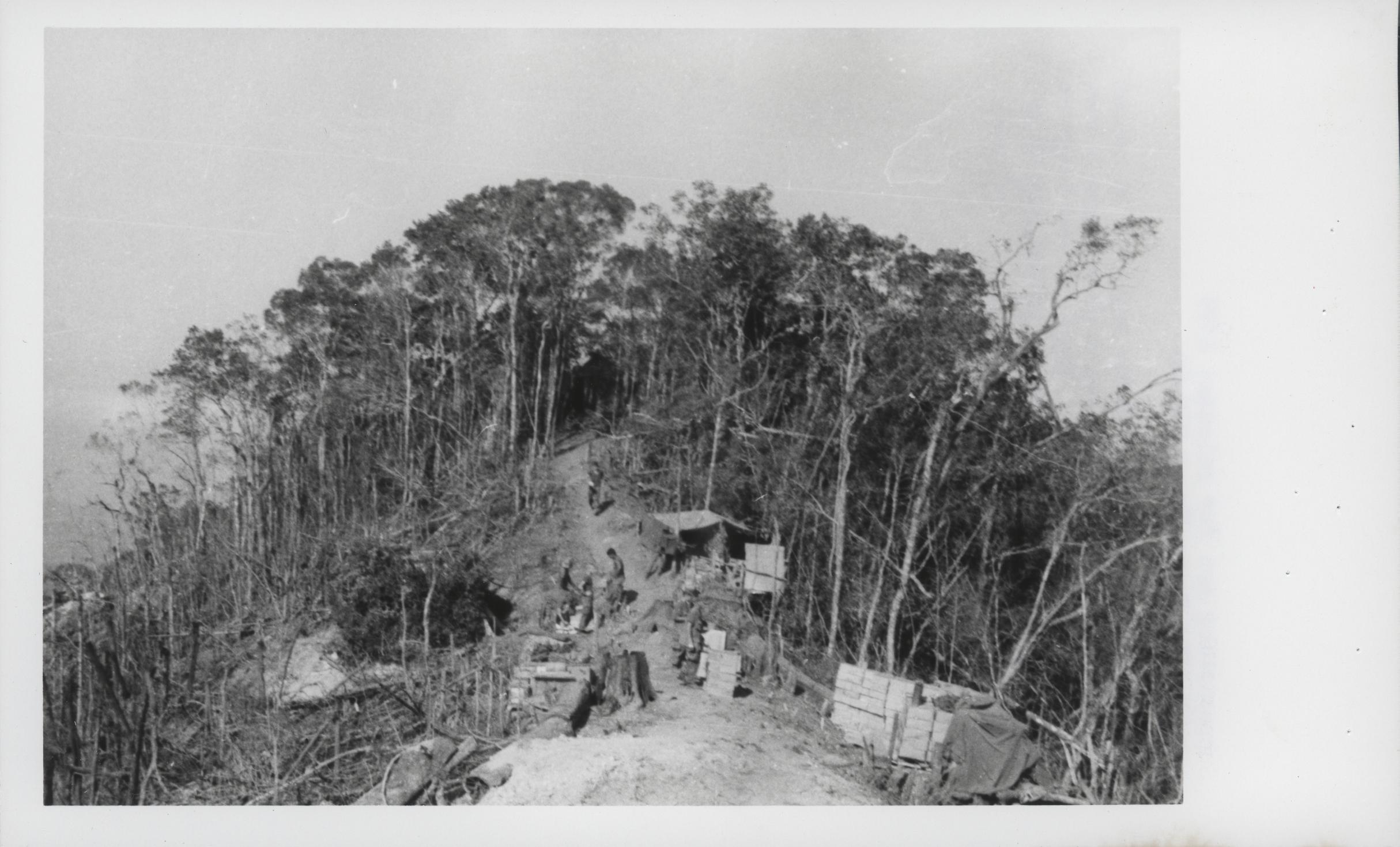
- 5th Marines on Hill 575
Date	7 December 1968 – 8 March 1969
Location	An Hoa Basin, Quảng Nam Province
Result	U.S. and South Vietnamese victory

Belligerents
United States; South Vietnam	North Vietnam

Commanders and leaders
BG Ross T. Dwyer; BG Samuel Jaskilka; COL Michael M. Sparks †	Unknown

Units involved
(United States) Task Force Yankee comprising: 1st Battalion, 3rd Marines; 3rd Battalion, 3rd Marines; 5th Marine Regiment; 1st Battalion, 7th Marines; 2nd Battalion, 7th Marines; Kilo Battery, 4th Battalion, 13th Marines; 3rd Battalion, 26th Marines (South Vietnam) 1st Ranger Group	Unknown

Casualties and losses
(United States) 183 killed (South Vietnam) 100 killed	US body count: 1,398 killed 29 captured

Operation Taylor Common was a search and destroy operation conducted by Task Force Yankee, a task force of the 1st Marine Division supported by the Army of the Republic of Vietnam (ARVN), southwest of Hội An from 6 December 1968 to 8 March 1969.

== Background ==
Base Area 112 was a Viet Cong (VC) and People's Army of Vietnam (PAVN) base area located in the mountains of Quảng Nam Province southwest of Da Nang near the area known to the Marines as the "Arizona Territory" The base was believed to support the PAVN 21st Regiment, 3rd Battalion, 68B Rocket Regiment, 2nd Battalion, 141st Regiment and command and support units.

The operational plan was for Task Force Yankee, an ad hoc unit based around the 5th Marine Regiment, to secure the An Hoa Basin together with the ARVN 1st Ranger Group, the Task Force would then construct a series of fire support bases to support operations west into the Base Area and finally destroy the Base Area.

== Operation ==
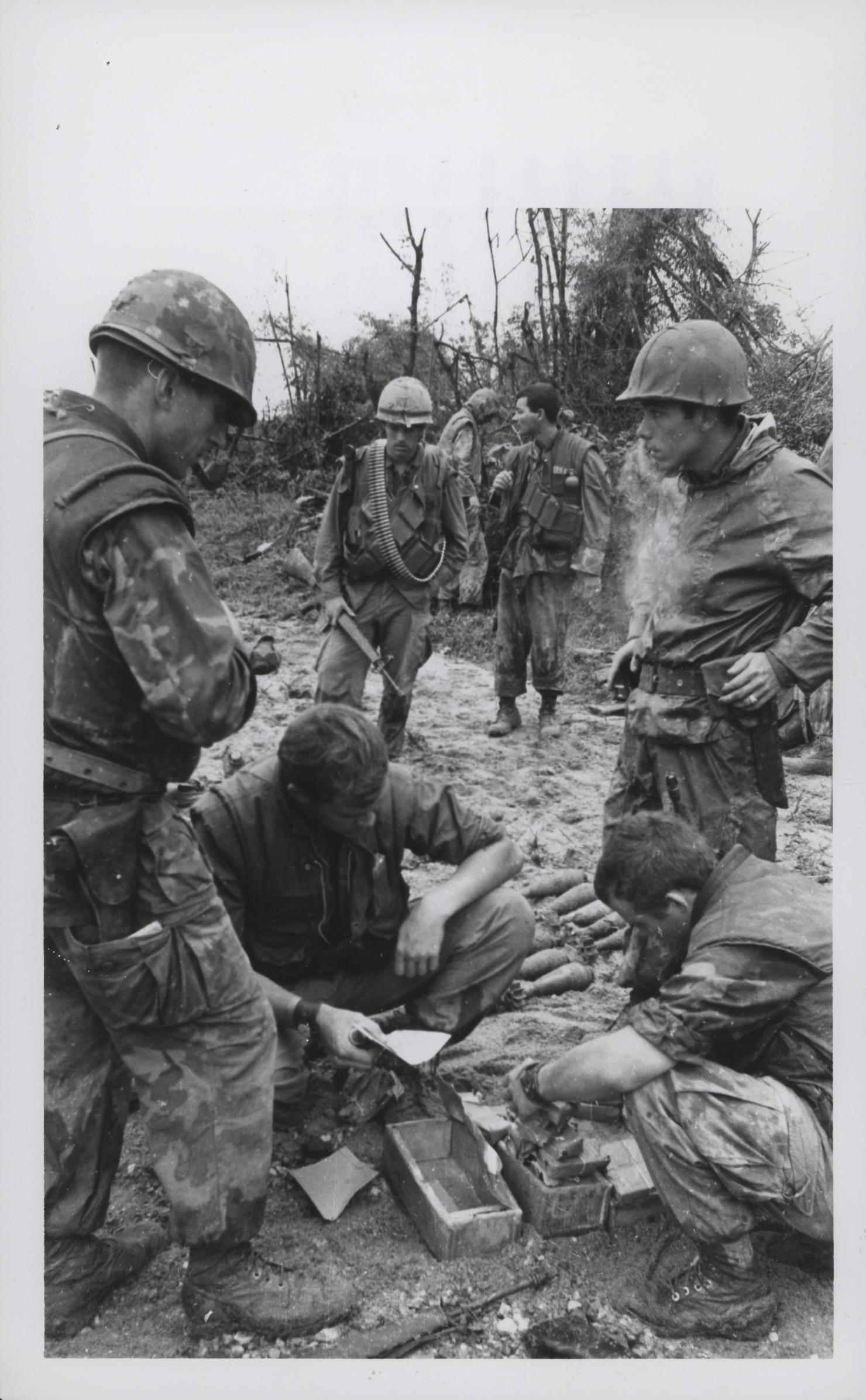
Marines inspect a PAVN ammunition cache

=== Phase 1 ===
The operation commenced on 7 December with the 2nd Battalion, 7th Marines being landed by helicopters from HMM-165 and HMM-364 into the Arizona Territory to act as a blocking force for the ARVN Rangers. The 2nd Battalion, 5th Marines and 3rd Battalion, 5th Marines which had just completed Operation Meade River had already moved southwest from the Liberty Bridge (15.841°N 108.121°E) into the An Hoa area.

On 9 December control of the operation passed to Colonel Michael M. Spark, commander of the 3rd Marine Regiment which had recently redeployed from Quảng Trị Province.

=== Phase 2 ===
On 11 December following a preparatory air and artillery strike the engineers of Company B, 3rd Engineer Battalion supported by Company K, 5th Marines landed on Hill 575 8 km southwest of An Hoa Combat Base and established Firebase Lance (15.726°N 108.003°E). On 13 December the engineers supported by Company E, 2/5 Marines established Firebase Pike (15.767°N 107.974°E) northwest of Firebase Lance.

On 15 December several M-121 Combat Trap bombs were dropped on Hill 558 in an experiment to blast helicopter landing zones in dense jungle. The Combat Trap was only a partial success and Company B, 3rd Engineer Battalion supported by 1st Battalion, 3rd Marines were landed by helicopters to establish Firebase Spear (15.767°N 107.974°E) 8 km west of Firebase Lance.

On 18 December 3rd Battalion, 3rd Marines was landed on Hill 375 4 km southwest of Firebase Spear and established Combat Operations Base Mace (15.677°N 107.958°E).

Having established their operating bases the Marines began patrolling west into the eastern part of Base Area 112, while they found numerous abandoned bunkers, barracks and support facilities no major encounters with the PAVN/Viet Cong occurred and Phase 2 of the operation ended on 31 December 1968

=== Phase 3 ===
On 1 January 1969 3/5 Marines was landed at Combat Operations Base Javelin (15.702°N 107.871°E) and proceeded to bombard Hill 508 (15.739°N 107.885°E) however heavy PAVN fire prevented a landing there and the 3/3 Marines was landed on Hill 728 and fought their way to Hill 508 seizing it by 15 January and establishing Firebase Maxwell there. The Marines then proceeded to search the western part of Base Area 112, establishing further firebases as they went and uncovering PAVN base camps and stores.

On 15 January an Army UH-1H carrying Colonel Spark and his command group was hit by machine-gun fire near Firebase Maxwell and crashed, killing all on board.

On 29 January the 1st Battalion, 7th Marines on Go Noi Island observed a 300 strong PAVN force crossing the Song Ky Lam and artillery fire was directed against them, the PAVN tried to escape to the west but were engaged by Company D, 5th Marines. The fighting continued all night before the PAVN broke contact and the next morning the bodies of 72 PAVN were found.

On 10 February Battalion Landing Team (BLT) 3rd Battalion, 26th Marines joined the operation and was landed in the Arizona Territory where they engaged numerous small PAVN units. At the end of February Company L, 3/26 Marines killed 75 PAVN and destroyed two anti-aircraft machine-gun positions.

By mid-February Base Area 112 had been largely neutralized and the participating units were needed in the DMZ area, so the operation was progressively scaled back, with the 3/3 Marines and the 3rd Marines command group being withdrawn on the 16th and redeployed to Đông Hà Combat Base, followed the next day by 1/3 Marines.

After midnight on 23 February, PAVN mortars hit An Hoa Combat Base triggering explosions in the ammunition dumps, followed by a sapper attack which was repulsed with gunship and artillery fire. At the same time, firebases Maxwell and Tomahawk (15.74°N 107.81°E) were hit by mortar and sapper attacks. Due to the withdrawal of participating units from the operation, it was decided to withdraw the Marines from the western firebases. On 3 March a patrol from Company M, 3/5 Marines was ambushed near Firebase Maxwell. Three Marines were killed and two of the bodies were left behind as the company withdrew. The next day the Marines recovered one of the bodies and the following day attempted to recover the other, but were ambushed again, and two Marines killed whose bodies also could not be recovered. On 6 March the Marines tried to recover the bodies again, but were forced back by PAVN fire. The bodies were later recovered by a reconnaissance team. Firebase Tomahawk was evacuated and closed on 5 March, while Maxwell was closed on 7 March.

== Aftermath ==
The operation ended on 8 March 1969. Marine losses were 183 killed and 1,487 wounded, ARVN losses were 100 killed and 378 wounded. The Marines reported 1,398 PAVN were killed and took 29 prisoner. One Marine, Lance Corporal William R. Prom, was awarded the Medal of Honor for gallantry during Taylor Common.

== See also ==
- Navy Unit Commendation TF Yankee 1968–1969
