= The Hill Fights =

Part of the Vietnam War (1967)

- Part of the Vietnam War
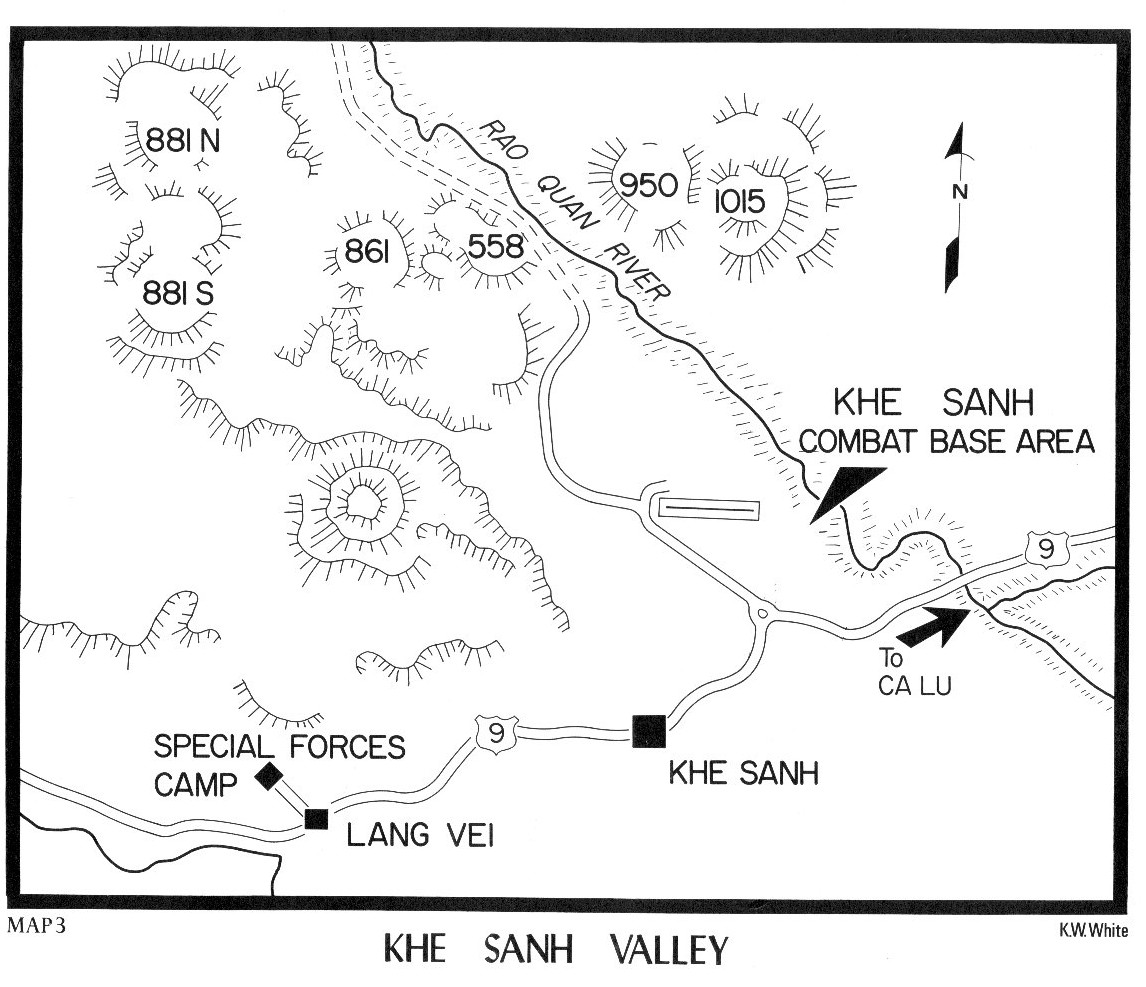
- Map showing location of hills around the Khe Sanh area
Date	24 April – 11 May 1967
Location	Near Khe Sanh, Quảng Trị Province, South Vietnam
Result	American victory
Territorial changes	Hill 861 secured

Belligerents
United States	North Vietnam

Units involved
2nd Battalion, 3rd Marines; 3rd Battalion, 3rd Marines; 9th Marine Regiment	6 Battalions from the 325C Division

Strength
~1,500	~2,000 troops (US Sources)

Casualties and losses
155 killed 425 wounded	US body count: 940 killed

The Hill Fights (also known as the First Battle of Khe Sanh) took place during the Vietnam War between the People's Army of Vietnam (PAVN) 325C Division and United States Marines on several hill masses north of the Khe Sanh Combat Base in northwest Quảng Trị Province.

== Background ==
On 20 April operational control of the Khe Sanh area passed to the 3rd Marine Regiment.

On 22 April 1967 SLF Bravo comprising 2nd Battalion, 3rd Marines supported by HMM-164 had commenced Operation Beacon Star on the southern part of the Street Without Joy straddling Quảng Trị and Thừa Thiên Provinces against the Vietcong (VC) 6th Regiment and 810th and 812th Battalions.

== Battle ==
=== Hill 861 ===
On 24 April, 2nd Platoon, Company B, 3rd Battalion, 3rd Marines moved to Hill 700 to establish a mortar position to support another company. Five Marines then moved to Hill 861 (16°40′36″N 106°41′13″E) to establish an observation post, but as they entered a bamboo grove near the summit they were ambushed by the PAVN, killing four Marines. After this contact, a squad was sent to investigate, and rescued the lone survivor of the ambush. As they attempted to recover the bodies of the dead, they were met with fire and withdrew into the mortar position. Another squad moved to the ambush site and recovered two bodies, but as an evacuation helicopter approached the hilltop it was hit by heavy fire, which was suppressed by helicopter gunships. 1st and 3rd Platoons, Company B were then ordered to move southeast across Hill 861 to cut off the PAVN but were hit by mortar fire, medevac helicopters were called in, attracting PAVN fire each time. 1st and 3rd Platoons dug in for the night, while 2nd Platoon withdrew to Khe Sanh Combat Base. Marines losses for the day were 12 dead, two missing (later found dead) and 17 wounded.

The next morning Company B continued its slow advance on Hill 861, hampered by fog, difficult terrain and PAVN fire. On the afternoon of 25 April, Company K, 3rd Marines (which was scheduled to relieve Company B at Khe Sanh from 29 April) arrived at Khe Sanh Base and immediately moved towards Hill 861 to support Company B. The 1st and 3rd Platoons of Company K moved up Hill 861 on different approaches and 1st Platoon was hit by fire from well-entrenched PAVN 300m from the summit. 2nd Platoon was sent to reinforce 1st Platoon and the fighting continued until nightfall when the Marines dug in. At 18:00 Company K, 9th Marines was flown into Khe Sanh to support the attack.

At 05:00 on 26 April, the 3rd Battalion command post and Khe Sanh Base were hit by mortar and recoilless rifle fire. Company K continued their assault on Hill 861 and were joined by Company K, 9th Marines around midday. The assault made little progress and the Marines withdrew protected by fire from helicopter gunships. Company B was also heavily engaged throughout the morning eventually breaking contact at 12:00 and establishing a defensive perimeter on a knoll. Medevac helicopters were called in, but as their approach brought PAVN mortar fire and by 14:45 the company commander reported that he was unable to move. Artillery was then walked into and around the company's position, forcing the PAVN to fall back. A Marine platoon was then sent to assist Company B as it fell back to the battalion command post. Also on 26 April, SLF Bravo received urgent orders to move to Khe Sanh to reinforce the 3/3 Marines. 2/3 Marines was flown to Phu Bai Combat Base and from there to Khe Sanh linking up with 3/3 Marines by 16:00 on 26 April.

On 27 April 3/3 Marines returned to Khe Sanh for replacements and Battery B, 12th Marine Regiment arrived at Khe Sanh to support Battery F. Marine artillery and aircraft were used to pound Hill 861 throughout the 27th and 28th, dropping 518,700 pounds of bombs and 1800 artillery rounds on the hill. Due to the dense foliage and overhead cover protecting many of the bunkers, Marine aircraft dropped Snakeye bombs to remove the foliage and expose the bunkers and then larger bombs (up to 2000 lb) to destroy them.

The Marines' plan was for 2/3 Marines to take Hill 861, then 3/3 Marines would move west securing the ground between Hill 861 and Hill 881 South (16°40′18″N 106°39′45.2″E), 2/3 Marines would then provide flank security for 3/3 Marines and take Hill 881 North (16°41′26.5″N 106°39′34.5″E).

On the afternoon of 28 April 2/3 Marines moved up Hill 861 with minimal opposition as the PAVN had withdrawn from the hill. The Marines found 25 bunkers and numerous fighting positions and reported an odor of dead bodies across the hilltop.

=== Hill 881S ===
On 29 April with 2/3 Marines having secured Hill 861, 3/3 Marines advanced from Khe Sanh towards a hill 750m northeast of Hill 881S that was to be used as an intermediate position for the attack on Hill 881S. Company M, 9th Marines engaged a PAVN platoon, while Company M, 3rd Marines secured the intermediate position and dug in.

On 30 April 2/3 Marines moved from Hill 861 to support 3/3 Marines and walked into a PAVN bunker complex suffering nine killed and 43 wounded, the Marines backed off to let artillery and air support hit the bunkers and then overran them. Company M, 3rd Marines and Company K, 9th Marines began their assault on Hill 881S encountering minimal resistance until 10:25 when they were hit by mortar fire and then heavy fire from numerous PAVN bunkers. The Marines were pinned down and only able to disengage after several hours with gunship and air support, the Marines suffered 43 killed and 109 wounded in the engagement while PAVN losses were 163 killed. Company M, 3rd Marines was rendered combat ineffective and was replaced by Company F 2/3 Marines and Company E, 9th Marines was deployed to Khe Sanh on the afternoon of 1 May.

The Marines withdrew from Hill 881S to allow for an intense air bombardment, on 1 May 166 Marine sorties were flown against Hills 881 North and South and over 650,000 lbs of bombs were dropped on them resulting in over 140 PAVN killed.

On 2 May Companies K and M, 9th Marines assaulted Hill 881S capturing it with minimal resistance by 14:20. The Marines discovered over 250 bunkers protected by anywhere between two and eight layers of logs and then 4–5 ft of earth, only 50 bunkers remained intact after the bombing.

=== Hill 881N ===
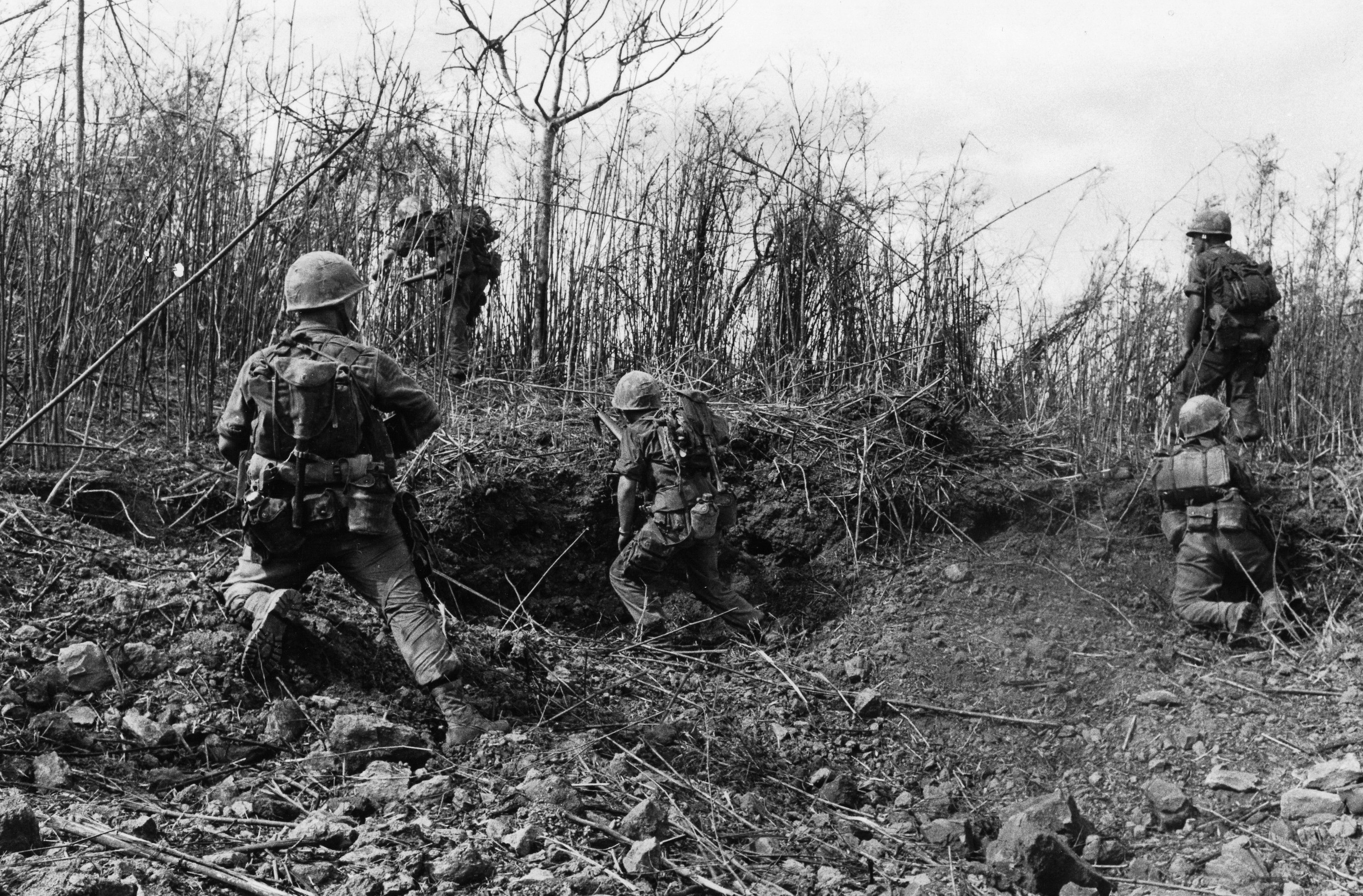
Company G, 2/3 Marines assault Hill 881N

At 10:15 on 2 May Companies E and G, 2/3 Marines assaulted Hill 881N from the south and east. Company G encountered a PAVN position and pulled back to allow for artillery support. Company E almost reached the summit of the hill when it was hit by an intense rainstorm and the battalion was pulled back into night defensive positions.

At 04:15 on 3 May a PAVN force attacked Company E's night defensive position, penetrating the east of the position and reoccupying some bunkers. A Marine squad sent to drive out the PAVN was hit by machine gun fire and a scratch squad of engineers was sent to support them while air and artillery strikes were called in on the PAVN. A flare ship arrived overhead and the Marines on Hill 881S could see approximately 200 PAVN forming up to attack Company E from the west and fired over 100 rounds of recoilless rifle fire to break up this fresh assault. At dawn reinforcements were flown in to support Company E while Company H, 2/3 Marines attacked the PAVN from the rear. The last bunker was cleared at 15:00, 27 Marines were killed and 84 wounded in the attack, while claiming the PAVN had lost 137 killed and three captured. Prisoner interrogations revealed plans for another attack on the Marine positions that night but this did not occur.

At 08:50 on 5 May Companies E and F, 2/3 Marines began their assault on Hill 881N, PAVN fire increased as they neared the summit and both companies pulled back to allow for air and artillery strikes. The assault resumed at 13:00 and by 14:45 the hilltop had been captured.

=== Subsequent operations ===
After securing Hill 881N the Marines thoroughly searched the area around Hills 881N and 881S and air and artillery strikes were called in on suspected PAVN positions, but it appeared that the PAVN had withdrawn north across the Vietnamese Demilitarized Zone or west into Laos.

On 9 May Company F, 2/3 Marines encountered a PAVN force 3.2 km northwest of Hill 881N, artillery fire was called in and Company E was deployed in support. The engagement resulted in 24 Marines killed and 19 wounded while US forces claimed the PAVN had lost 31 killed, while a further 203 recent graves were alleged to have been discovered in the area.

At midnight on 9/10 May the PAVN attacked Reconnaissance Team Breaker of the 3rd Reconnaissance Battalion. The PAVN could have easily overrun the Marines, but instead targeted the Marine helicopters attempting to extract them severely damaging several helicopters. Marine losses were four Reconnaissance Team members and one helicopter pilot, while claiming PAVN losses were seven dead.

== Aftermath ==
The Hill Fights officially ended on 10 May. Marine losses were 155 dead and 425 wounded while PAVN losses were reported by the Marines to be 940 dead. Intelligence gathered after the battle revealed that the PAVN plan was to build up stores and positions north of Khe Sanh Base, isolate the base from resupply by attacks on Marines bases in northern I Corps, launch a diversionary attack on Lang Vei Special Forces Camp (which occurred as scheduled on 4 May) and then several Regiments of the 325C Division would overrun Khe Sanh Base, however the encounter on 24 April had frustrated the PAVN plan.

As with the later Battle of Khe Sanh, the PAVN's strategy remains unclear. Trần Văn Trà, PAVN commander of the B-2 Front in III Corps stated in a 1990 interview that the intention of the border battles and particularly at Khe Sanh was to draw U.S forces into the remote border regions away from the population centers that would be attacked during the Tet Offensive.

Following the conclusion of the battle the Marines began Operation Crockett in the same area.
