= Khe Sanh Combat Base =

Former US base in South Vietnam

Khe Sanh Combat Base (Khe Sanh Airfield)
- Khe Sanh, Quảng Trị province in Vietnam
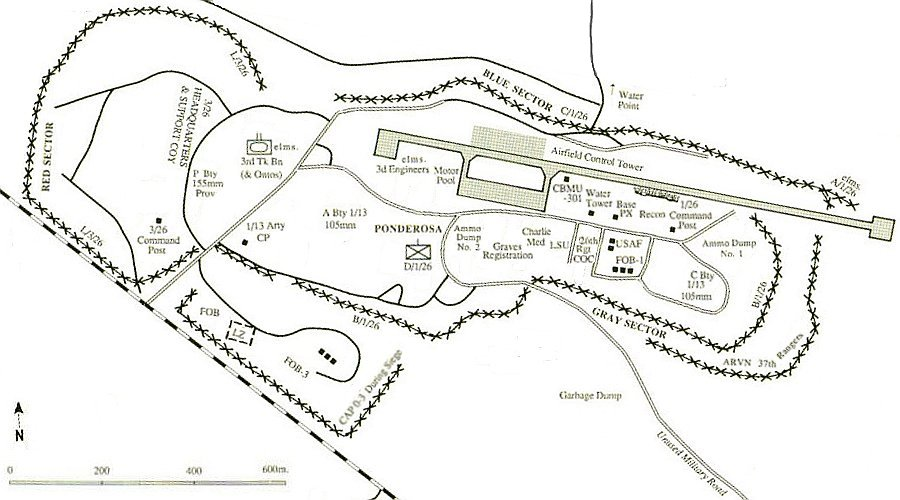
- Diagram of base

Site information
- Type: Marine/Army base
- Operator: Army of the Republic of Vietnam (ARVN); United States Marine Corps; United States Army (U.S. Army)
- Condition: Abandoned

Location
- Shown within Vietnam
- Coordinates: 16.65420°N 106.72423°E

Site history
- Built: 1962
- In use: 1962-1975
- Battles/wars: Vietnam War; Battle of Khe Sanh; Operation Lam Son 719

Garrison information
- Garrison: 3rd Marine Division; 1st Brigade, 5th Infantry Division

Airfield information
- Elevation: 1,608 feet (490 m) AMSL
Runways
Direction	Length and surface
10/28	3,300 feet (1,006 m) PSP

Khe Sanh Combat Base (also known as Ta Con) was a United States Marine Corps outpost south of the Vietnamese Demilitarized Zone (DMZ) in Quang Tri province used during the Vietnam War.

== History ==
US Army Special Forces (Detachment A-101, Company C, 5th Special Forces Group) constructed a camp in August 1962 at an old abandoned French fort, about 2km east of the village of Khe Sanh and just below Route 9. It served as an outpost of the Civilian Irregular Defense Groups (CIDG). Its purpose was to keep watch on People's Army of Vietnam (PAVN) infiltration along the border and to protect the local population.

In November 1964, the Special Forces team moved from the French fort to a light-duty airstrip, built by French forces in 1949 on the Xom Cham Plateau, above Route 9 and about 2km north of their former base. This new site, which eventually became the Khe Sanh base, had several advantages. Militarily, it was on relatively level ground and offered good fields of fire in all directions. The terrain provided both good drainage and stable soil, mostly consisting of "laterite clay or weathered iron/aluminum rock." It also contained a few basalt outcroppings, at what was later called the "Rock Quarry". At their new camp, the Special Forces and CIDG personnel built a number of bunkers.

In January 1966 the People's Army of Vietnam (PAVN) attacked the camp with 120 mm mortars and intelligence indicated that a PAVN buildup was taking place in the area. In March MACV instructed the III Marine Amphibious Force (III MAF) to plan a one-battalion security operation around the camp. On 27 March 3rd Marine Division commander MG Wood B. Kyle ordered the 4th Marine Regiment at Phu Bai Combat Base to deploy the 1st Battalion, 1st Marines and supporting artillery and mortar batteries to Khe Sanh. 1/1 Marines commander Lt. Col. Van D. Bell flew into Khe Sanh to plan his deployment and found the Special Forces there to be nervous and leaving all patrolling outside the perimeter to Nùng forces. On 3 April the operational order for Operation Virginia was issued, with the operation to begin on 5 April. On 4 April an advance unit was landed at Khe Sanh, but the arrival of the rest of the force was delayed by bad weather and the effects of the Buddhist Uprising and it wasn't until 18 April that VMGR-152 Lockheed Martin KC-130s were able to complete the deployment. The plan called for sequential sweeps to the northeast, northwest and then southwest of the base. On 19 April HMM-163 helicopters landed the headquarters unit and Company C in a blocking position 6km north of the base and then landed Companies A and B 9 km further east, Companies A and B then swept west meeting no PAVN and joined up with Company C on 21 April and the force then returned to the base. Reconnaissance patrols of the northwest sector indicated no PAVN presence and so the secondnd phase of the operation was cancelled. III MAF then ordered 1/1 Marines to march east along Route 9 which had been closed for several years to determine if there was any PAVN buildup south of the DMZ. The artillery unit was moved to Ca Lu to cover Route 9 and on 1 May the 1/1 Marines completed the 30 miles (48 km) march from the base to Cam Lộ encountering no PAVN.

In early September 1966, COMUSMACV General William Westmoreland, fearing that PAVN might skip around the main Marine defenses at The Rockpile and Dong Ha and attempt to open a corridor in the northwest corner of Quang Tri province in the mountains bordering both Laos and North Vietnam, suggested that III MAF reinforce Khe Sanh with a Marine battalion. The Marine command resisted Westmoreland's suggestion. More than one Marine general expressed the belief that Khe Sanh had no basic military value. General Lowell E. English, the 3rd Marine Division ADC, declared "When you're at Khe Sanh, you're not really anywhere. It's far away from everything. You could lose it and you really haven't lost a damn thing." Despite Marine protests, it was soon obvious that III MAF would have to move into the area. The catalyst was a 26 September intelligence report that pinpointed a PAVN troop concentration and base camp only 14km northeast of Khe Sanh. III MAF bowed to the inevitable and ordered Lieutenant colonel Peter A. Wickwire's 1st Battalion, 3rd Marines, already on the alert to move to Dong Ha from Da Nang, to move to Khe Sanh instead. On 29 September, Marine KC-130 transports ferried the 1/3 Marines, reinforced with an artillery battery, to Khe Sanh. Its new mission was to determine the extent of the PAVN buildup in the area. Wickwire established liaison with the U.S. Army Special Forces advisor at Khe Sanh who believed that the area was in imminent danger of being overrun. The Marines established their area of operations, coordinated their activities with the Army of the Republic of Vietnam (ARVN) forces in the area, and manned defensive positions around the Khe Sanh airstrip. The 1st Battalion conducted extensive patrolling out to maximum artillery range, but made little contact with any PAVN troops. The original 30-day stay was extended into 1967. During this period, the Marines killed 15 PAVN troops, but North Vietnamese intentions remained obscure.

In December 1966, Special Forces Detachment A-101 moved from Khe Sanh to a site near the village of Lang Vei.

Fighting began at Khe Sanh in late April 1967 with the Hill Fights, which later expanded into the 1968 Battle of Khe Sanh. U.S. commanders hoped that the PAVN would attempt to repeat their famous victory at the Battle of Dien Bien Phu, which would permit the U.S. to wield enormous air power. Boeing B-52 Stratofortresses alone dropped more than 75,000 tons of bombs on the PAVN 304th and 325th divisions encroaching the combat base in trenches.

On April 1, 1968, the U.S. Army's 1st Cavalry Division launched Operation Pegasus to break the siege of the base. All three brigades from the 1st Cavalry participated in this vast airmobile operation, along with a Marine armor thrust.

The defense of Khe Sanh commanded international attention and was considered the climactic phase of the Tet Offensive. On July 5, 1968, the combat base was abandoned, the U.S. Army citing the vulnerability of the base to dug-in enemy artillery positions in neutral Laos and the arrival of significant airmobile forces in I Corps (1st Cavalry and 101st Airborne divisions). However, the closure permitted the 3rd Marine Division to conduct mobile operations along the DMZ.

On 30 January 1971, Khe Sanh was reactivated by the U.S. Army (Operation Dewey Canyon II) to support Operation Lam Son 719, the South Vietnamese invasion of Laos. On the night of 23 March a PAVN sapper attack on Khe Sanh resulted in 3 Americans killed and several aircraft and 2 ammunition dumps destroyed, PAVN losses were 14 killed and 1 captured. The base was abandoned again on 6 April 1971.

On 27 January 1972 a U.S. Air Force Lockheed AC-130 gunship was shot down by a PAVN SA-2 missile over the base. In March 1973, American intelligence reported that the PAVN had rebuilt the airstrip at Khe Sanh and were using it for courier flights into the South.

== Tourism ==
Khe Sanh Combat Base can be visited daily as part of tours starting in Huế. Since its abandonment, most of the base has become overgrown by wilderness or coffee and banana plants. A small museum on the site contains exhibits of historical pictures, weapons, and ubiquitous "impression books" common among battlefield and heritage museums in Vietnam. Additionally a C-130, Boeing CH-47 Chinook, Bell UH-1 Iroquois, artillery and armor, restored bunkers and portions of the airstrip are visible.

== Gallery ==
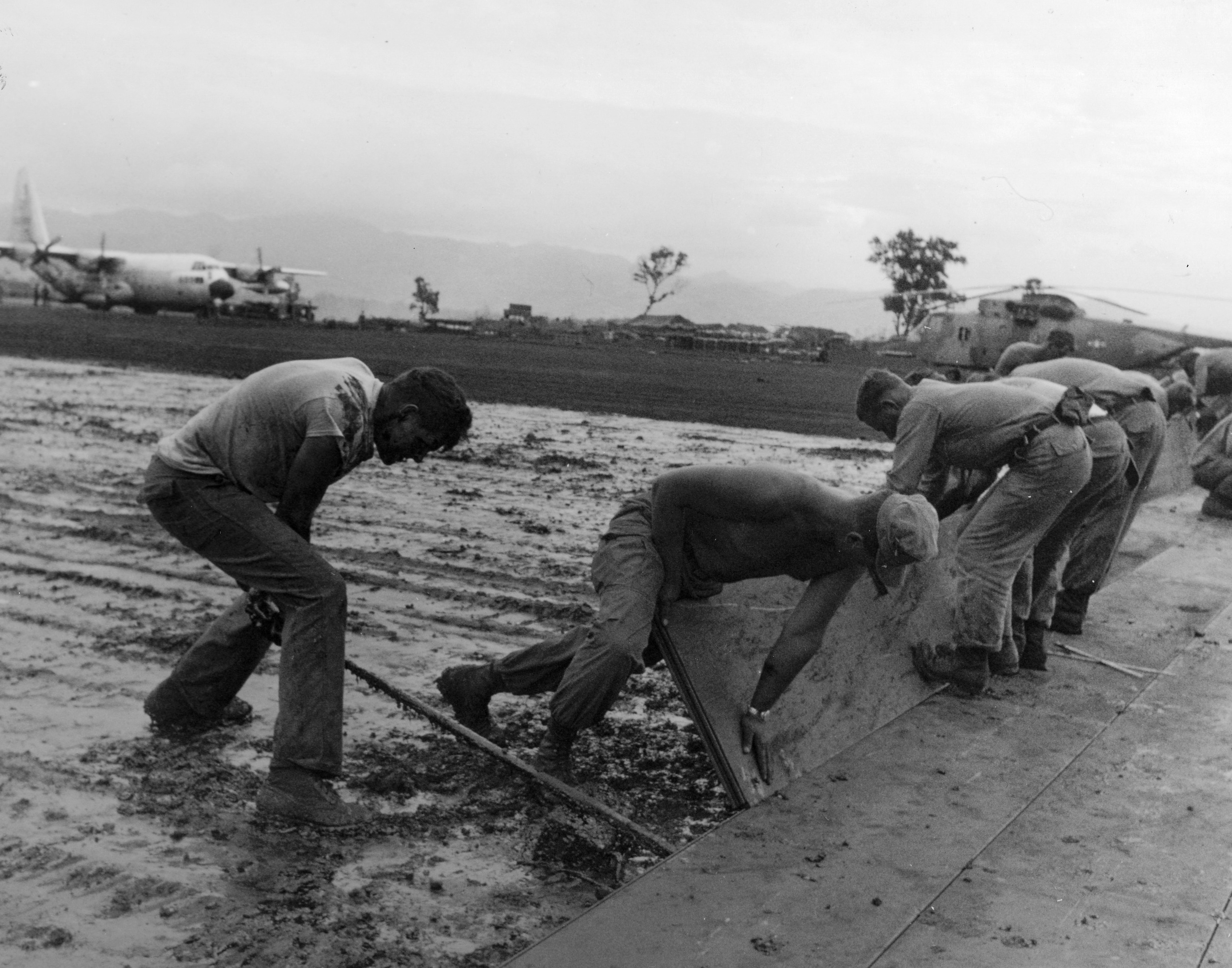
Seabees of Mobile Construction Battalion (MCB) 301 set and seal runway mats into place at Khe Sanh, 29 November 1967

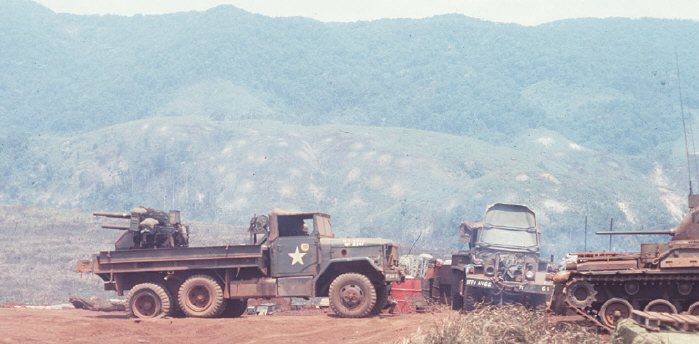
Khe Sanh base, 1968

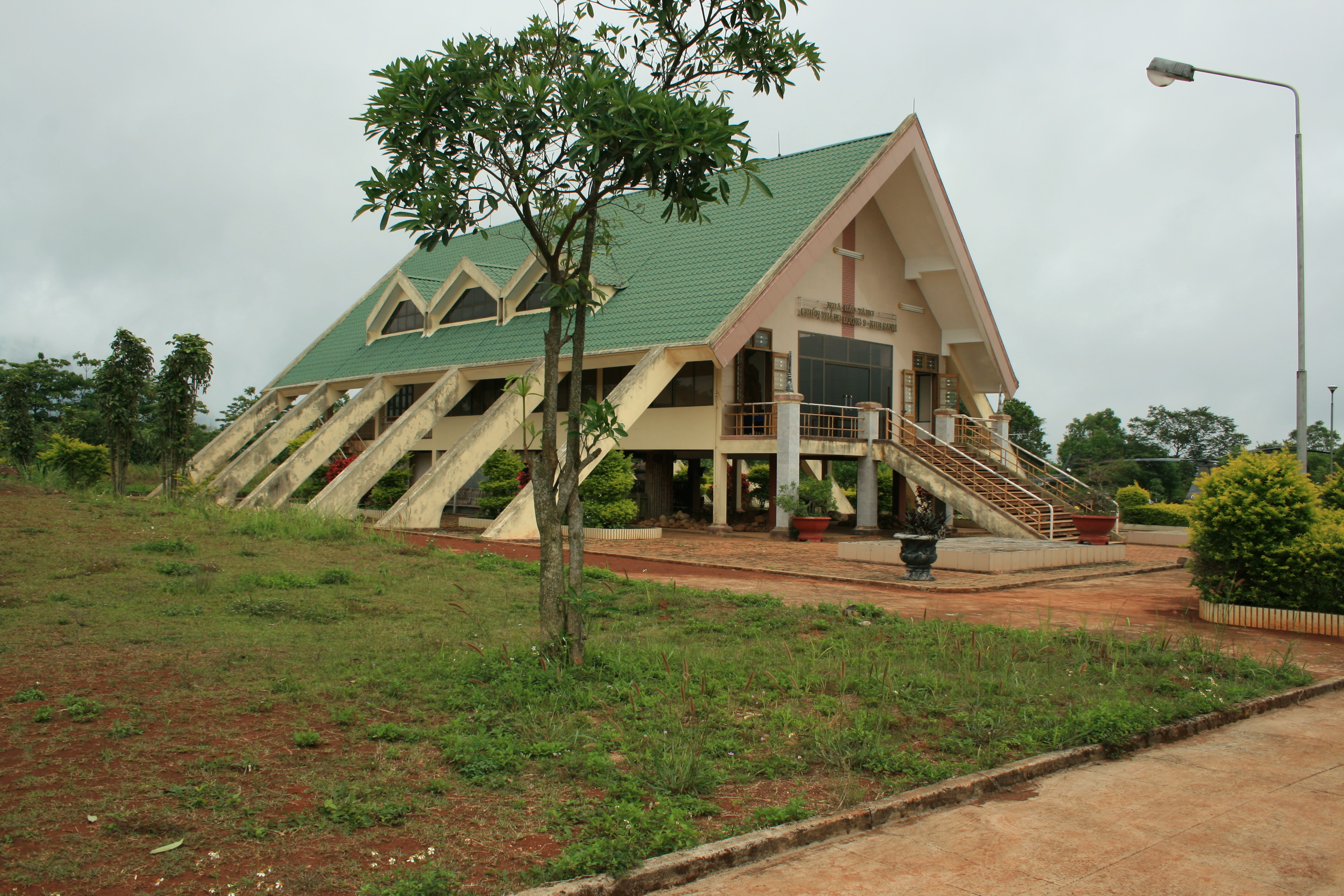
Museum

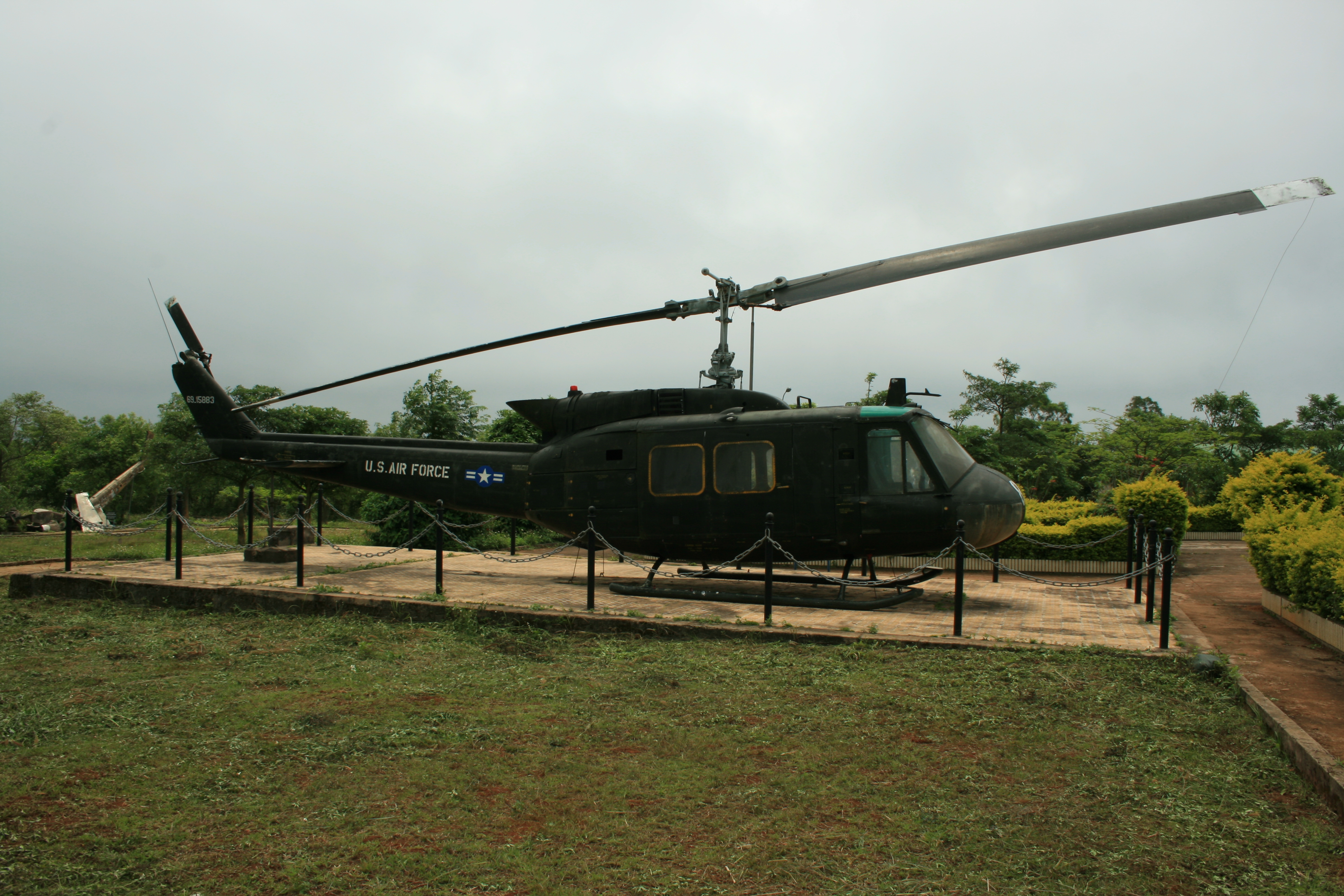
UH-1H helicopter

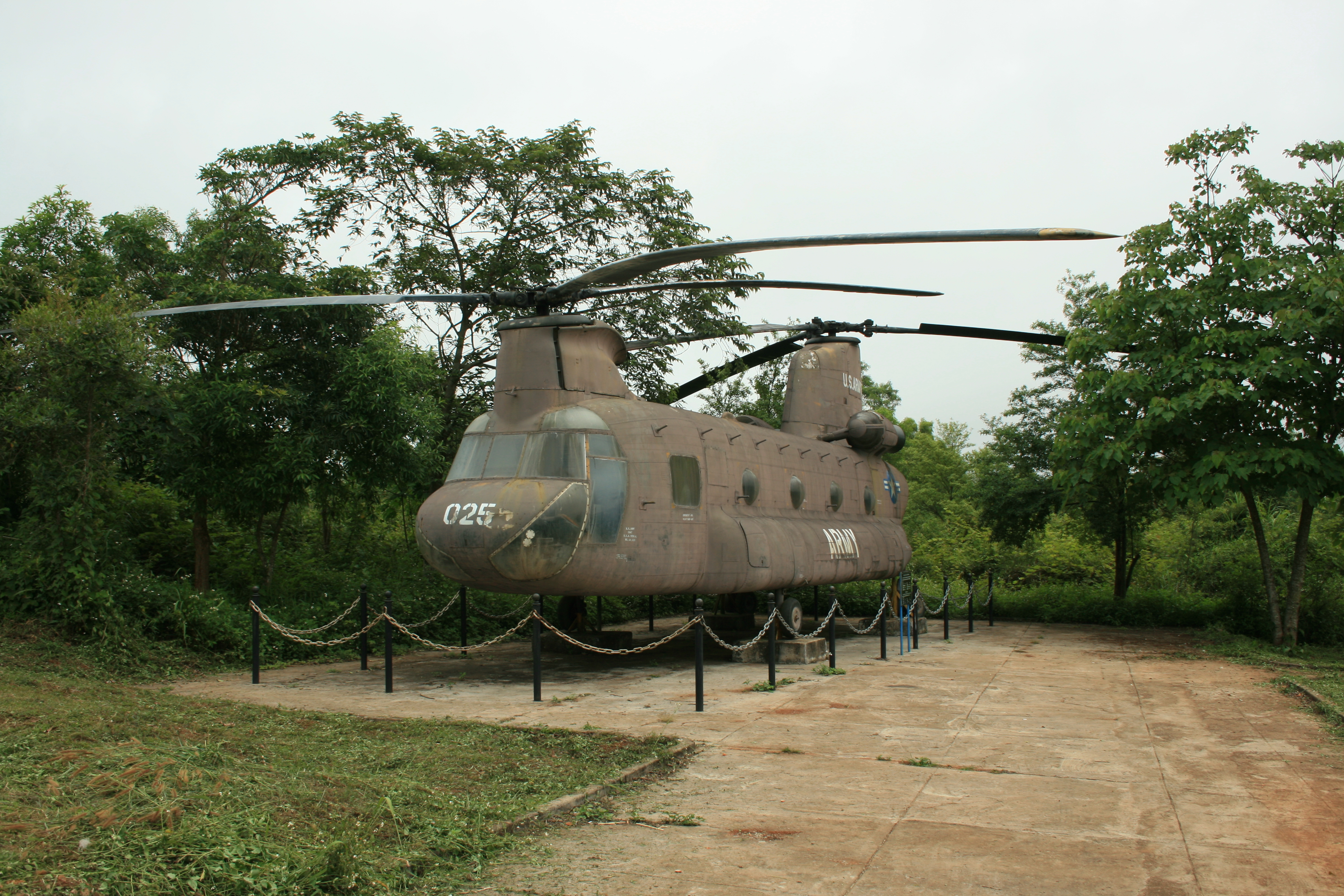
CH-47 helicopter

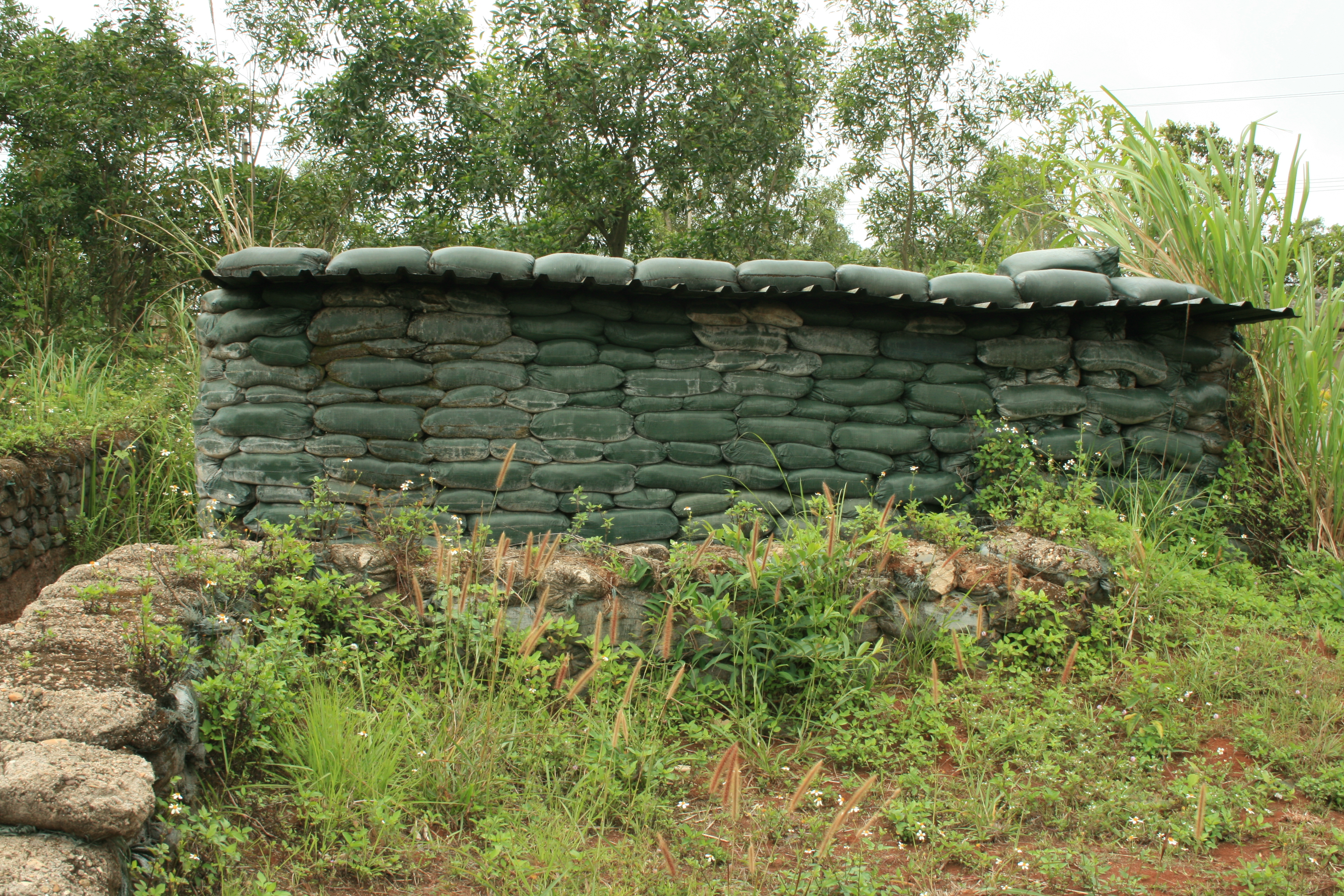
Outside view of a restored bunker

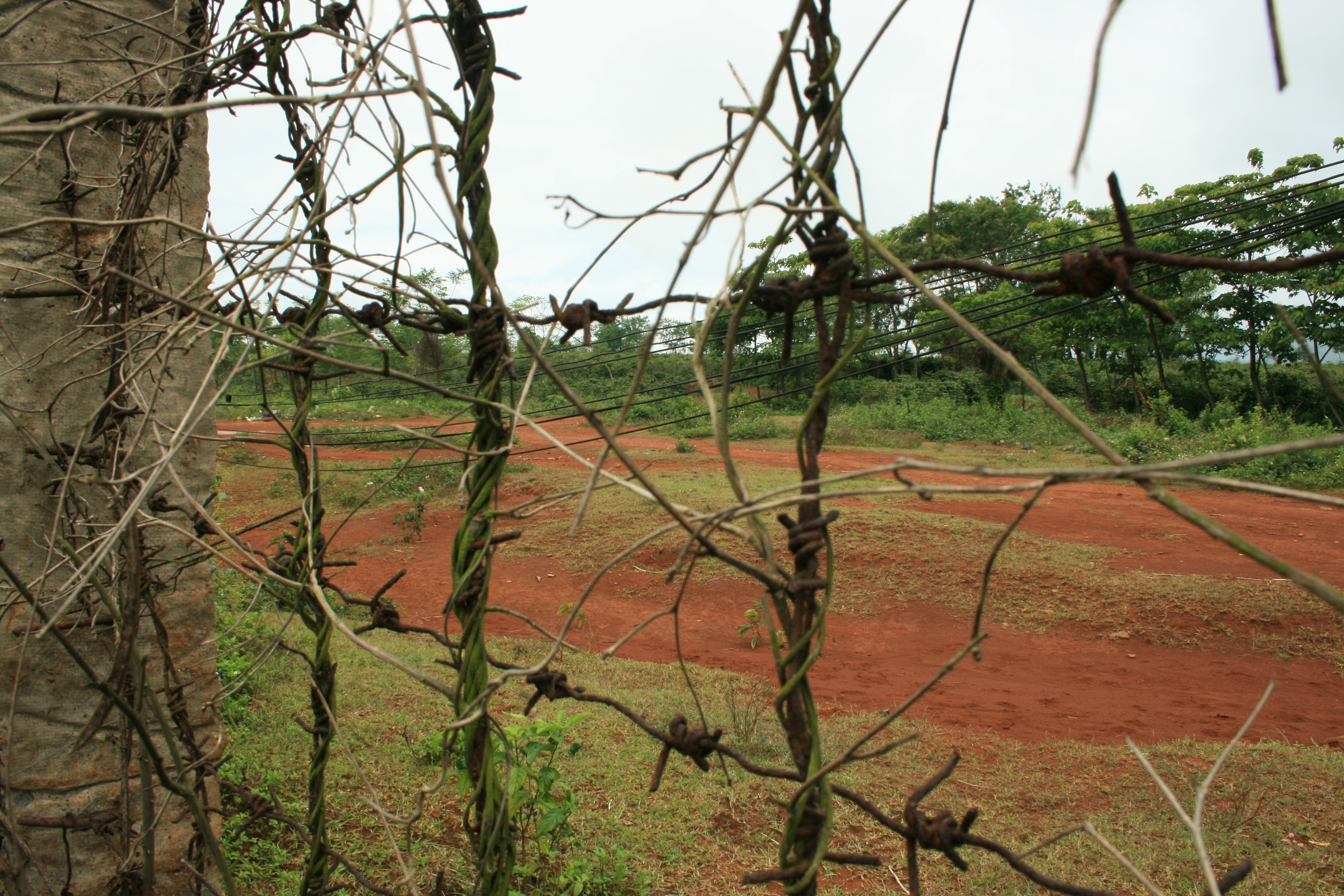
The airstrip

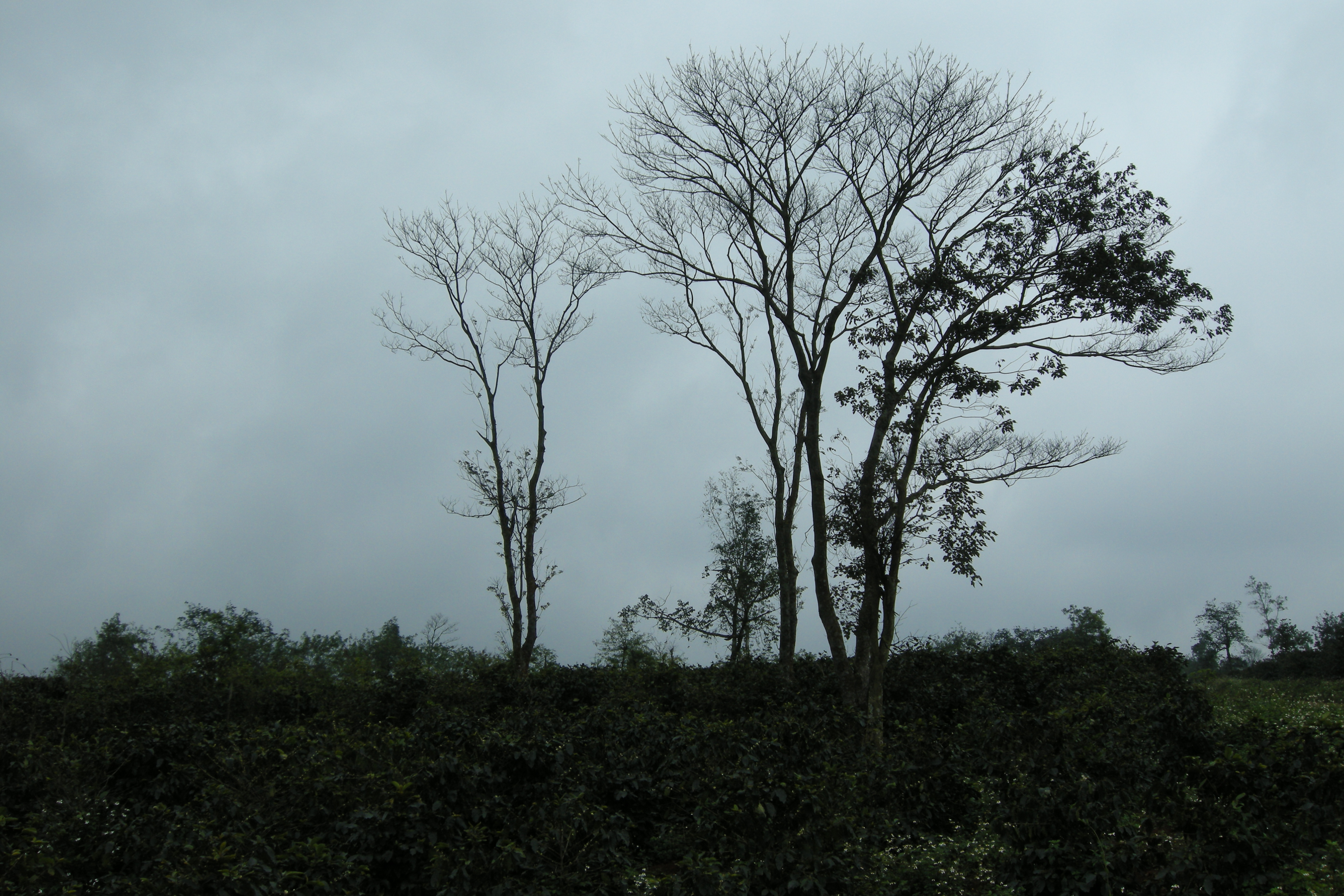
Khe Sanh landscape.

== See also ==
- Vietnamese Demilitarized Zone
- Khe Sanh
