= Operation Houston =

Part of the Vietnam War (1968)

- Part of Vietnam War
Date	26 February – 12 September 1968
Location	Route 1, Thừa Thiên Province, South Vietnam 16.321°N 107.773°E
Result	U.S. victory

Belligerents
United States	Viet Cong; North Vietnam

Commanders and leaders
Foster C. LaHue; Robert D. Bohn	

Units involved
1st Marine Division Task Force X-Ray: 5th Marine Regiment (until 22 July); 26th Marine Regiment	K-2 Battalion

Casualties and losses
117 killed	US body count: 702 killed 29 captured

Operation Houston was a security operation in the Vietnam War conducted by the United States Marine Corps’ Task Force X-Ray to reopen and secure Route 1 between Da Nang and Phu Bai Combat Base that took place from 26 February to 12 September 1968.

== Background ==
With the securing of Huế in late February, Task Force X-Ray, a brigade-size component of the 1st Marine Division built around the 1st and 5th Marine Regiments at Phu Bai Combat Base prepared to take the offensive to open Route 1 between Da Nang and Phu Bai, which had been closed since the start of the Tet Offensive. According to Marine reports, during the Tet Offensive the Vietcong (VC) and People’s Army of Vietnam (PAVN) had damaged or destroyed 20 bridges and 26 culverts along Route 1, largely between Hải Vân Pass and Phu Bai.

== Operation ==
On 26 February, Colonel Robert D. Bohn's 5th Marine Regiment began Operation Houston in the Phú Lộc District and Hải Vân Pass sectors. To carry out the operation, Bohn controlled his 3rd Battalion, 5th Marines and the 2nd Battalion, 3rd Marines. In addition, Brigadier General Foster C. LaHue, the Task Force X-Ray commander, provided the 5th Marines with operational control over three United States Army battalions, the 1st and 3rd Battalions, 327th Infantry Regiment and the 2nd Battalion, 502nd Infantry Regiment. While the infantry provided security Seabees, Marine engineers and the U.S. Army 35th Engineer Battalion worked on the repairs of Route 1 and its bridges and culverts.

On 29 February, the engineers completed the repair work on the final section of Route 1 between Hải Vân Pass and Phú Lộc. Technically Route 1 was now open throughout the entire length of I Corps. III Marine Amphibious Force (III MAF), nevertheless, postponed the first road convoy from Da Nang to Phu Bai until March. On 2 March the 1st Battalion, 5th Marines and the 2nd Battalion, 5th Marines, which had fought in the Battle of Huế rejoined their parent regiment in the operation in the Phú Lộc District. At the same time the 1/327th Infantry and the 2/502nd Infantry returned to Army control while the 2/327th Infantry was withdrawn from the operation and sent on an operation along Route 547 southwest of Huế.

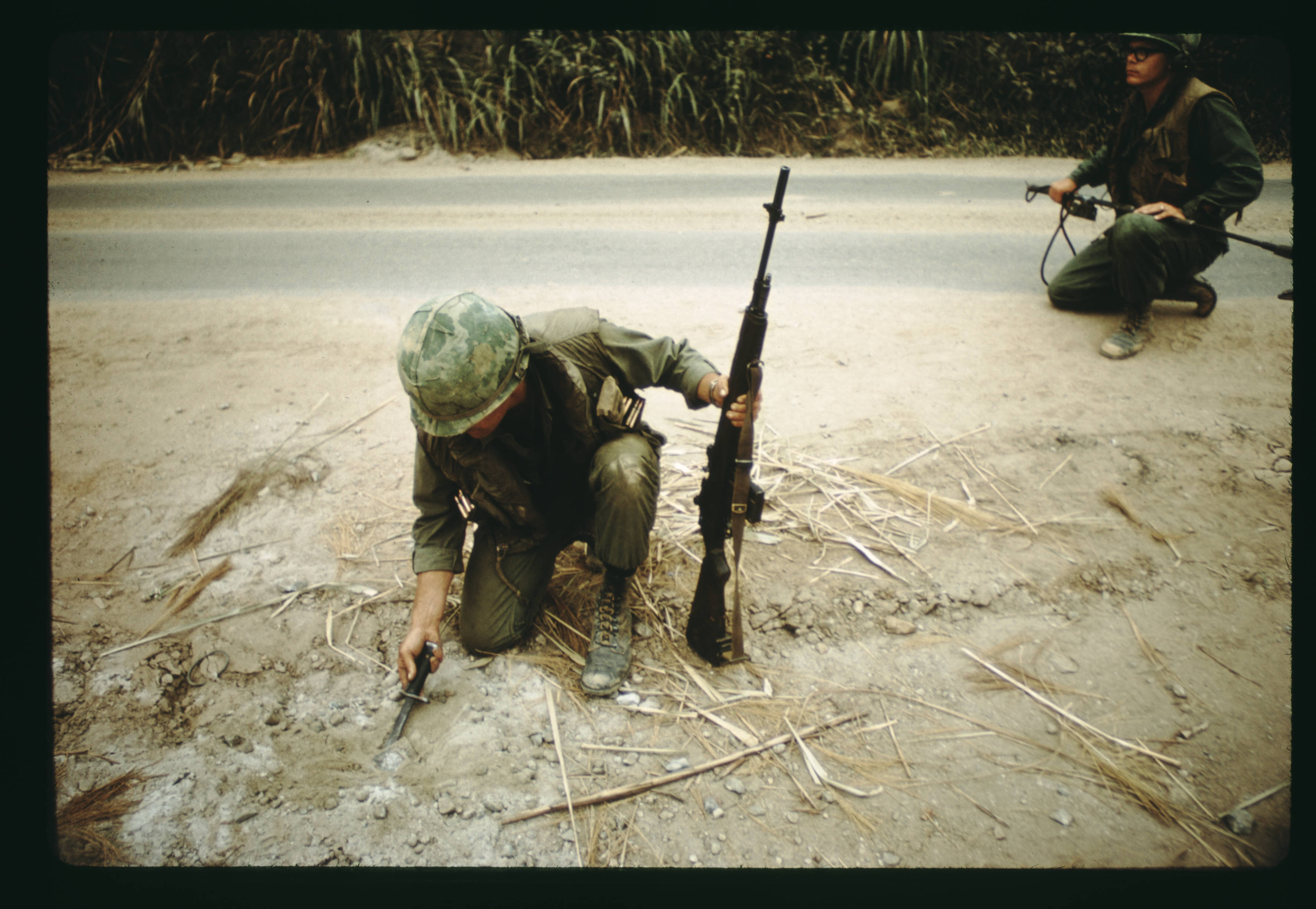
35th Engineer Battalion engineers demining on the Hải Vân Pass, March 1968

In late March LaHue expanded the 5th Marines' Houston tactical area of responsibility (TAOR) to include the remaining portion of the X-Ray TAOR, excluding the area occupied by the newly arrived 1st Battalion, 27th Marines between Hue and Phu Bai and the Phu Bai vital area. At the same time, the task force commander ordered the 1st Battalion, 5th Marines with two companies to take over from the 1st Marine Regiment the protection of key outposts and bridges, especially the Truoi River Bridge (16.321°N 107.7728°E) on Route 1 southeast of Phu Bai.

On 31 March 1968, under cover of a mortar and ground attack, VC sappers successfully placed demolitions on the Truoi River Bridge and a smaller bridge, designated Bridge No. 4. The VC K-2 Battalion with three companies reinforced by three sapper platoons had simultaneously attacked the two bridge outposts and a nearby Combined Action Platoon, CAP H-3. Alerted by one of their ambushes, the Combined Action Marines repulsed the VC attack after it reached the outer wire. However both the Truoi Bridge and Bridge No. 4 sustained major damage with both bridges impassable for motor traffic and Bridge No. 4 to foot traffic as well. Company C, 1/5th Marines had placed two squads on the smaller bridge supported by a machine gun and a recoilless rifle and a platoon supported by two machine guns and two mortars on the Truoi River Bridge. The attacking force on Bridge No. 4 killed eight Marines and wounded seven more. On the Truoi River Bridge, the Marine platoon sustained casualties of six dead and 23 wounded. The VC lost a total of 12 men in the attacks. In an investigation of the attack, Bohn reported "the strength of the security forces was adequate." He blamed the success of the attack partially on the fact that the company was new to the sector and had only occupied these positions the day before.

On 1 June, Phase III of the operation began with the 5th Marines conducting extensive rice denial operations in the Phu Thu and Vinh Loc Districts, east and southeast of Phu Bai, in conjunction with South Vietnamese Regional and Popular Forces. During the month, the Marines captured more than 31,000 pounds of rice and returned them to government control and relocated more than 44 tons to secure storage areas. The regiment also conducted a number of short operations in the jungle canopy south of the Phu Bai vital area, in the Phú Lộc and Hải Vân Pass areas of the operation, to locate and destroy PAVN/VC forces, supply caches and base areas.

During Phase IV of the operation, which began on 1 July, Task Force X-Ray assumed operational control of battalion landing team (BLT) 2nd Battalion, 7th Marines, which on 9 July assaulted into the Vinh Loc District by helicopter and amphibian tractors and continued the task force's vigorous rice denial campaign. A week later, the BLT joined the 5th Marines and was helilifted to the Thon Mu Kham Valley, southwest of Phu Bai, where fire support bases were constructed and search operations begun.

On 22 July the 1st Battalion, 26th Marines and the 3rd Battalion, 26th Marines replaced the 5th Marines in the operation. With the departure of the BLT and the 5th Marines, the 26th Marine Regiment, assumed tactical responsibility for the Task Force X-Ray area of operations and began Phase V of the operation on 25 July.

The operation mainly saw the use of booby-traps and small hit and run ambushes by the PAVN/VC.

== Aftermath ==
Operation Houston ended on 12 September, after more than six months during which the 5th Marines, and then the 26th Marines, successfully kept Route 1 open between Phu Bai and Da Nang. The Marines reported 702 VC/PAVN killed, 29 captured and 258 weapons captured, while 117 Marines were killed. As Houston ended, XXIV Corps units assumed control of the area around Phu Bai, allowing the dissolution of Task Force X-Ray and movement of the 26th Marines south to the Da Nang TAOR.
