= Operation Auburn =

Part of the Vietnam War (1967–1968)

- Part of the Vietnam War
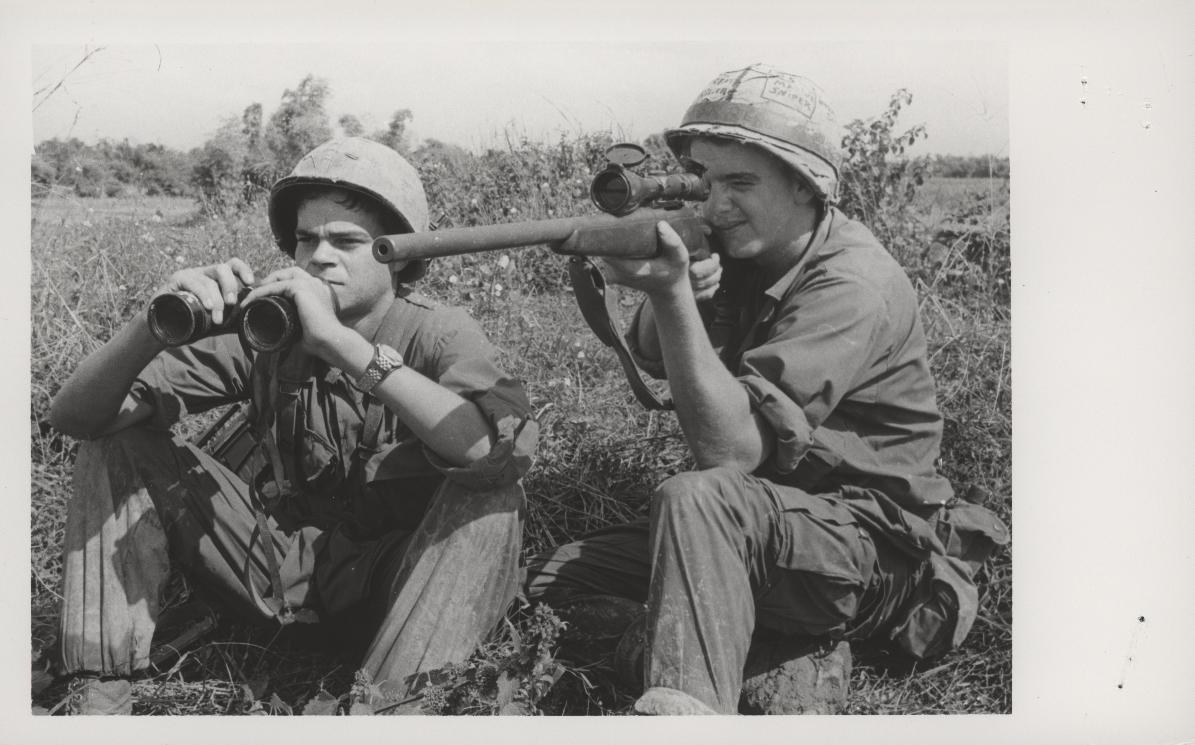
- Company I, 3/5 Marines sniper team during Operation Auburn
Date	28 December 1967 – 3 January 1968
Location	Go Noi Island, Quảng Nam Province, South Vietnam 15.85°N 108.186°E
Result	U.S. claims operational success

Belligerents
United States	Viet Cong

Commanders and leaders
COL Robert D. Bohn; LTC William Rockey	Unknown

Units involved
2nd Battalion, 3rd Marines; 2nd Battalion, 5th Marines; 3rd Battalion, 5th Marines	R-20 Battalion; V-25 Battalion

Casualties and losses
23 killed	37 killed

Operation Auburn was a US Marine Corps operation that took place south of Danang, lasting from 28 December 1967 to 3 January 1968.

== Background ==
Go Noi Island was located approximately 25 km south of Danang to the west of Highway 1, together with the area directly north of the island, nicknamed Dodge City by the Marines due to frequent ambushes and firefights there, it was a Vietcong (VC) and People's Army of Vietnam (PAVN) stronghold and base area. While the island was relatively flat, the small hamlets on the island were linked by hedges and concealed paths providing a strong defensive network. Go Noi was the base for the VC R-20 and V-25 Battalions and, it was believed, elements of the PAVN 2nd Division.

The operational plan called for four Marine infantry Companies to establish blocking positions along the railway tracks on Go Noi Island while an Army of the Republic of Vietnam (ARVN) force swept east to west along Route 537 in the hope of pushing the PAVN/VC against the Marines and a southern blocking position established by the 1st Battalion, 7th Infantry Regiment in the Operation Wheeler/Wallowa area.

== Operation ==
Following a preparatory air and artillery bombardment, at 09:04 on 28 December 1967 Marine helicopters started landing Company E, 2nd Battalion, 3rd Marines at Landing Zone Hawk (15.848°N 108.192°E). The Marines were met with small arms fire coming from Bao An Dong village (15.85°N 108.186°E) west of the landing zone and as they advanced on the village they were hit by heavy fire and withdrew to allow for airstrikes on the village. Company I, 3rd Battalion, 5th Marines and the command group arrived at the landing zone by 11:30, Company I quickly secured a nearby hamlet while Company E remained engaged at Bao An Dong suffering 5 killed and 9 wounded. Company I was then sent to support Company E but was stopped by VC hidden in the elephant grass. With both Companies pinned down air and artillery support was called in close to the Marine lines. At 15:30 Company M, 3/5 Marines was landed and sent forward to support Company E. At 18:00 under the cover of UH-1E gunship fire, Company E withdrew to join up with Company M and establish a night defensive position. 3rd Marine losses for the day were 19 dead and 25 wounded, 9 of the Marine dead had been left behind during the withdrawal, while the PAVN/VC had lost 32 killed.

On the morning of 29 December Companies E and G 2nd Battalion, 5th Marines and the 5th Marine Regiment command group landed at LZ Hawk and the 5th Marines commander Colonel Robert D. Bohn assumed command of the operation from the 3/5 Marines commander, Lt. Col. Rockey. Company E followed by Company G advanced on Bao An Dong and after a brief skirmish with PAVN/VC defenders secured the village by midday, also recovering the bodies of the 9 Marines killed on the previous day. Two suspected VC were captured and an estimated six VC had been killed.

On 30 December the ARVN concluded their sweep operation with minimal results but the operation was extended after intelligence was received that an enemy unit was located between LZ Hawk and the Liberty Bridge (15.841°N 108.121°E). The operation was however reduced in size and operational command returned to Rockey. By the afternoon of 3 March the Marines had swept 7 km west and were located near the Liberty Bridge having encountered minimal resistance.

== Aftermath ==
Operation Auburn concluded at 17:25 on 3 January 1968, the Marines had suffered 23 dead and 60 wounded and the PAVN/VC 37 killed. The majority of the Marine losses took place during the engagement on 28 December.

The Marines would return to Go Noi during Operation Jasper Square and Operation Allen Brook.
