= Robert D. Bohn =

U.S. Marine Corps general (1921–2002)

Robert Dewey Bohn
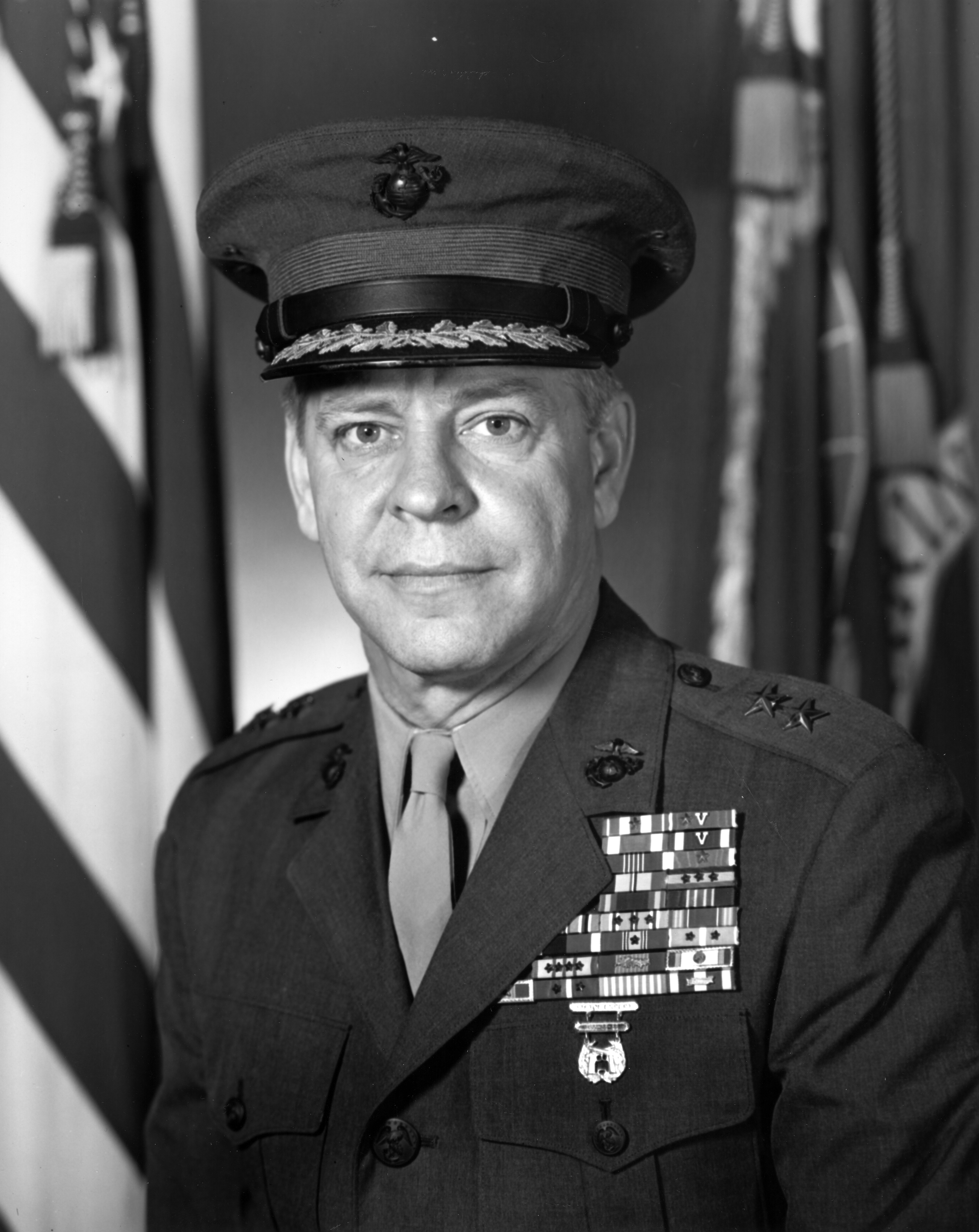
- MG Robert D. Bohn, USMC
- Born: November 30, 1921; Neenah, Wisconsin, US
- Died: November 3, 2002 (aged 80); Fairfax, Virginia, US
- Burial place: Arlington National Cemetery
- Military career
- Allegiance: United States
- Branch: United States Marine Corps
- Service years: 1942–1974
- Rank: Major General
- Service number: 0-37498
- Commands: MCB Camp Lejeune; 2nd Marine Division; 5th Marine Regiment
- Conflicts: World War II: Philippines Campaign; Battle of Iwo Jima; Battle of Okinawa; Korean War: Battle of Inchon; Battle of Pusan Perimeter; Second Battle of Seoul; Vietnam War: Operation Auburn; Tet Offensive; Operation Allen Brook
- Awards: Silver Star (2); Legion of Merit (2); Purple Heart (2)
- Other work: Sports Club Owner

Robert Dewey Bohn (November 30, 1921 – November 3, 2002) was a highly decorated officer of the United States Marine Corps, reaching the rank of major general. He served in three wars and concluded his career as commanding general of Marine Corps Base Camp Lejeune.

== Biography ==
=== World War II ===
Bohn was born in Neenah, Wisconsin, on November 30, 1921, and, following high school, he graduated with a bachelor's degree from the University of San Francisco. During his university studies, Bohn enlisted in the Marine Corps Reserve in August 1942 and following his graduation in April 1944, he was commissioned a Second Lieutenant on May 3, 1944. He was then sent to the Officer Candidates School at Quantico, Virginia, for officer training. After ten weeks of hard drill, Bohn sailed to the Pacific area to be assign to the Marine detachment aboard the light aircraft carrier USS Monterey.

While aboard that vessel, his detachment took part in the support actions during the landings at Leyte and Mindoro in the Philippines in fall 1944. Bohn later participated in the support operations during Iwo Jima and Okinawa operations in early 1945 and received Navy Commendation Medal with Combat "V".

Upon the end of the War, Bohn remained in active service and after his transfer to the United States, he spent some time with the Marine Barracks in Boston, Massachusetts. He later reached the rank of First Lieutenant and was appointed Officer in Charge of the District Headquarters Recruiting station in Omaha, Nebraska. Bohn returned to Pacific in 1949, when was attached to the Marine Barracks at Guam.

=== Korean War ===
Bohn was later transferred to the 3rd Battalion under Lieutenant Colonel Robert Taplett and appointed Commanding Officer of "G" Company. With the outbreak of the Korean War, Bohn sailed to Korea with his company and took part in the Battle of Pusan Perimeter within 1st Marine Division under Major General Oliver P. Smith in August 1950 and his task was to lead his "G" Company up to the hill held by enemy in the vicinity of Kosong. Advancing under enemy rifle and machine gun fire, Bohn was wounded in the shoulder and neck, but refused to be evacuated and continued to personally lead and deploy his troops in an effective attack. Only until all enemy forces were annihilated did he allow himself to be taken to the rear and his wounds to be dressed. For this act of valor, Lieutenant Bohn was decorated with the Silver Star.

Following his recovery from his wounds, Bohn returned to his "G" Company and later took part in the Battle of Inchon in September 1950, where he led his company up to the radio hill near Wolmido and subsequently secured the nearby Sowolmi-do. Bohn later participated in the Second Battle of Seoul at the end of September 1950 and reached the rank of Captain. He was wounded again and succeeded by First Lieutenant Charles D. Mize in command of "G" Company. Bohn was subsequently sent back to the United States for treatment.

=== Post Korea service ===
In April 1952, Bohn was appointed to the prestigious capacity of naval aide to General Omar Bradley, Chairman of the Joint Chiefs of Staff. He served in this capacity until July 1953, when he was ordered to the special course at Amphibious Warfare School at Quantico, Virginia. Upon graduation from the course in 1954, Bohn was attached as Operations Officer (S-3) to the Training Unit-I under Lieutenant Colonel Regan Fuller at Camp Pendleton, where he participated in the development of new combat tactics and techniques. While in that capacity, he received promotion to the rank of Major in December 1954.

Bohn was ordered to Okinawa, Japan in September 1956 and appointed Operations Officer of 9th Marine Regiment, 3rd Marine Division under Major General Alan Shapley. While in Japan, the 3rd Marine Division took part in defense of the Far Eastern area in a tense situation after the Korean War. His tour of duty ended in December 1957, when he was ordered to the staff of the Marine Corps Schools Quantico as an instructor of Tactics within Junior Course. He was promoted to the rank of lieutenant colonel on July 1, 1960.

He left United States during 1961 and sailed to the United Kingdom as a student at Joint Services Staff College in Latimer, England. Bohn graduated in April 1962 and subsequently served as U.S. representative for Amphibious Warfare at British Ministry of Defence.

=== Dominican crisis ===
Lieutenant Colonel Bohn returned stateside in October 1964 and assumed duties as Commanding Officer 2nd Battalion, 6th Marines, 2nd Marine Division at Camp Lejeune, North Carolina. Shortly before the outbreak of Communist-attempted coup in Dominican Republic in April 1965, Bohn's unit was designated "Ready Battalion" within the 2nd Marine Division. That meant that the battalion was brought up to full strength in both men and equipment. Bohn decided to take his battalion on a conditioning march from Camp Lejeune to Fort Bragg, but 2nd Marine Division Commander, Major General Ormond R. Simpson, disallowed it.

Bohn argued vehemently in the favor of the march, but Simpson was unmoved. Bohn continued to argue and finally got his permission for the march. After two days of marching, the crisis in the Dominican Republic broke. Bohn as Commander of "Ready Battalion", constantly called the division headquarters and asked if he should return to Camp Lejeune. Major General Simpson's response was negative. Bohn called him several more times during the march, but the answer was still negative. After several days, the 2nd Battalion reached Fort Bragg, and Bohn was informed by division chief of staff, Colonel John R. Chaisson, that designation "Ready Battalion" was switched to 1st Battalion, 6th Marines by Major General Simpson. The 1st Battalion already began with the preparation for the deployment to the Dominican Republic, and Bohn's battalion stayed in the States.

Bohn was transferred to Washington, D.C., in October 1965 and assumed duties as a member of NATO Military Posture Study group, Joint Chiefs of Staff. While in Washington, Bohn attended George Washington University and graduated with a master's degree. He was promoted to the rank of colonel in June 1966 and ordered to the course at Industrial College of the Armed Forces.

=== Vietnam War ===
Bohn graduated in June 1967 and received orders for deployment in Vietnam. He joined the staff of the 1st Marine Division under the command of Major General Donn J. Robertson and was assigned to division operations officer. His division took part in the combats in Quế Sơn Valley at that time and Bohn assumed command of 5th Marine Regiment on October 17, 1967.

He led his regiment during Operation Auburn in December 1967 at Go Noi Island south of Danang. This search-and-destroy mission was launched on December 28 and Bohn assumed operational command of the operation. He came under enemy mortar fire, but remain calm and led his units during the attack on entrenched enemy positions. Bohn deployed his command in forward area and continued in operation until January 3, 1968. For his gallantry in action and leadership, Bohn was decorated with his second Silver Star.

When enemy launched Tet Offensive at the end of January 1968, his regiment took part in the street fighting during the Battle of Huế. Bohn was transferred to the staff of 1st Marine Division at the beginning of May and appointed assistant chief of staff for operations. He took part in Operation Allen Brook in the summer of 1968 and received the Legion of Merit with Combat "V" for his service in this capacity.

Bohn was ordered back to the States in July 1968 and appointed secretary of the general staff at Headquarters Marine Corps under Lieutenant General William J. Van Ryzin. While in this capacity, he was decorated with the recently established Meritorious Service Medal. Bohn was promoted to the rank of brigadier general on September 10, 1969, and appointed assistant division commander, 2nd Marine Division at Camp Lejeune, North Carolina.

Brigadier General Bohn also served as temporary division commanding officer from June 5 to September 28, 1971, when his superior, Major General Michael P. Ryan was appointed deputy commander Fleet Marine Force Atlantic. He was relieved by Major General Fred E. Haynes Jr. at the end of September of that year and subsequently ordered back to Headquarters Marine Corps in Washington, D.C., as assistant chief of staff for programs.

He was promoted to the rank of major general on May 1, 1973, and assumed duties as commanding general of Marine Corps Base Camp Lejeune on August 22 of that year. In this capacity, Bohn was co-responsible for the Marine military training on the East Coast in the later part of Vietnam War. For his service in this capacity, he was decorated with his second Legion of Merit.

Major General Robert D. Bohn retired from the Marine Corps service on September 1, 1974, after 32 years of service to his country.

=== Retirement ===
Following his retirement from the Marine Corps, he was active in business and founded Courts Royal Racquetball Clubs. Bohn later lived in Alexandria, Virginia, before he moved to Falls Church, Virginia.

Major General Robert D. Bohn died of pneumonia on November 3, 2002, at Fairfax Nursing Center. He is buried at Arlington National Cemetery together with his wife Anna Marie Serocca. They had together two daughters, Barbara and Nancy.

== Decorations ==
Here is the ribbon bar of Major General Robert D. Bohn:

1st Row	Silver Star with one 5/16" Gold Star		Legion of Merit with one 5/16" Gold Star and Combat "V"	Meritorious Service Medal
2nd Row	Navy Commendation Medal with Combat "V"	Army Commendation Medal	Purple Heart with one 5/16" Gold Star	Combat Action Ribbon
3rd Row	Navy Presidential Unit Citation with three stars	Navy Unit Commendation	Navy Meritorious Unit Commendation	American Campaign Medal
4th Row	Asiatic-Pacific Campaign Medal with three 3/16 inch service stars	World War II Victory Medal	Navy Occupation Service Medal	National Defense Service Medal with one star
5th Row	Korean Service Medal with two 3/16 inch service stars	Vietnam Service Medal with four 3/16 inch service stars	Vietnam Gallantry Cross with Palm	Republic of Korea Presidential Unit Citation
6th Row	Vietnam Gallantry Cross Unit Citation	Philippine Liberation Medal with two stars	United Nations Korea Medal	Vietnam Campaign Medal

Military offices
Preceded by Herbert L. Wilkerson	Commanding General of the Camp Lejeune; August 22, 1973 – September 1, 1974	Succeeded by Fred E. Haynes Jr.
Preceded by Michael P. Ryan	Commanding General of the 2nd Marine Division; June 5, 1971 – September 28, 1971	Succeeded by Fred E. Haynes Jr.
