= Jerry Haynes =

American actor (1927–2011)

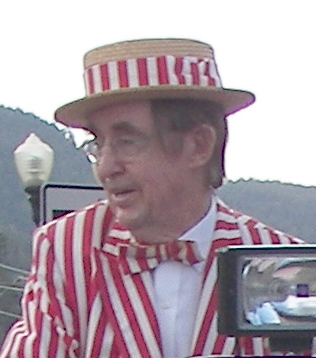
- Jerry Haynes, dressed as Mr. Peppermint, participating in Red River, New Mexico 4th of July parade
- Born: Jerome Martin Haynes; January 31, 1927; Dallas, Texas, U.S.
- Died: September 26, 2011 (aged 84); Longview, Texas, U.S.
- Other name: Mr. Peppermint
- Occupation: Actor
- Years active: 1961–2009
- Spouse: Doris Haynes
- Children: Gibby Haynes
- Relatives: Fred E. Haynes Jr. (brother)

Jerome Martin "Jerry" Haynes (January 31, 1927 – September 26, 2011) was an American actor from Dallas, Texas. He is most well known as Mr. Peppermint, a role he played for 30 years as the host of one of the longest-running local children's shows in television, the Dallas-based Mr. Peppermint (1961–1969), which was retitled Peppermint Place for its second run (1975–1996). He also had a long career in local and regional theater and appeared in more than 50 films. A 1944 graduate of Dallas' Woodrow Wilson High School, he was the father of Butthole Surfers frontman Gibby Haynes.

== Early life ==
He was born in Dallas, Texas to Louise Schimelpfenig Haynes and Fred Haynes. In 1990, Haynes was inducted into Woodrow Wilson High School's Hall of Fame. Jerry graduated from Southern Methodist University after attending Louisiana State University and Yale.

== Family ==
Jerry was the father of vocalist Gibby Haynes of Butthole Surfers, and his brother was Major General Fred E. Haynes Jr., USMC.

== Acting career ==
=== The "Mr. Peppermint" years ===
Haynes began his most famous role in 1961, playing a character who wore a red- and white-striped jacket and straw hat and carried a candy-striped magic cane. The original show ran for nine years as a live show on WFAA-TV (Channel 8, the ABC affiliate in Dallas owned by the parent company of the Dallas Morning News), with Mr. Peppermint talking with a variety of puppet characters and including everything from cartoons to French lessons.

Early in the run of his show, an accident of fate made Haynes the first to report the Kennedy assassination on local news, together with his WFAA program director, Jay Watson. During lunch on the day of the shooting, the two men watched the Presidential motorcade pass on Main Street, and less than a minute later heard the deadly shots after the limousine turned onto Elm Street. The men quickly located and interviewed eyewitnesses, going on the air shortly later:

I ran three blocks back to the station, and Jay got some eyewitnesses and brought them over. He and I were the first to go live on local TV and report the terrible moment. I went home that afternoon, and Doris and I gathered our children around and discussed it as best we could. There was no direct discussion about it on Mr. Peppermint the next week. I didn't feel qualified to counsel the viewers on it. We just behaved in a subdued and respectful manner.

— Jerry Haynes on the Kennedy assassination

During these early years, Mr. Peppermint began at 7:30 AM and ran for one hour, competing in its last half-hour with the national CBS broadcast of Captain Kangaroo but usually winning its time slot. National trends shifted, however, and in 1970, the show was replaced by a talk program for the adult audience. Haynes moved back to the Channel 8 news team, reporting on sports (as he did for a few years in the 1950s before the Mr. Peppermint assignment) alongside sports director Verne Lundquist (later of CBS Sports fame); included among the sports legends Haynes interviewed (in much the same "subdued and respectful manner" as his Mr. Peppermint persona) were Joe Namath, Merlin Olsen, Hayden Fry, the then-head football coach of Southern Methodist University, Dallas Cowboys head coach Tom Landry and their then-star quarterback Roger Staubach. Haynes reported on the Cowboys' home of Texas Stadium as it neared completion and prepared for its inaugural season in 1971, and on the newly relocated Texas Rangers home of Arlington Stadium as the former minor league ballpark completed upgrades and renovations, preparing for the Rangers' inaugural season the following year, bringing the American League to the state of Texas.

After the Federal Communications Commission called in 1975 for more educational programming for children, Haynes donned the candy-striped suit again, this time for a retooled Peppermint Place, a taped half-hour kids' magazine-style program, still originating from the WFAA studios. The show continued in that format for over 20 years, eventually being syndicated to 108 markets nationwide before ending its run in 1996.

=== Other television and film work ===
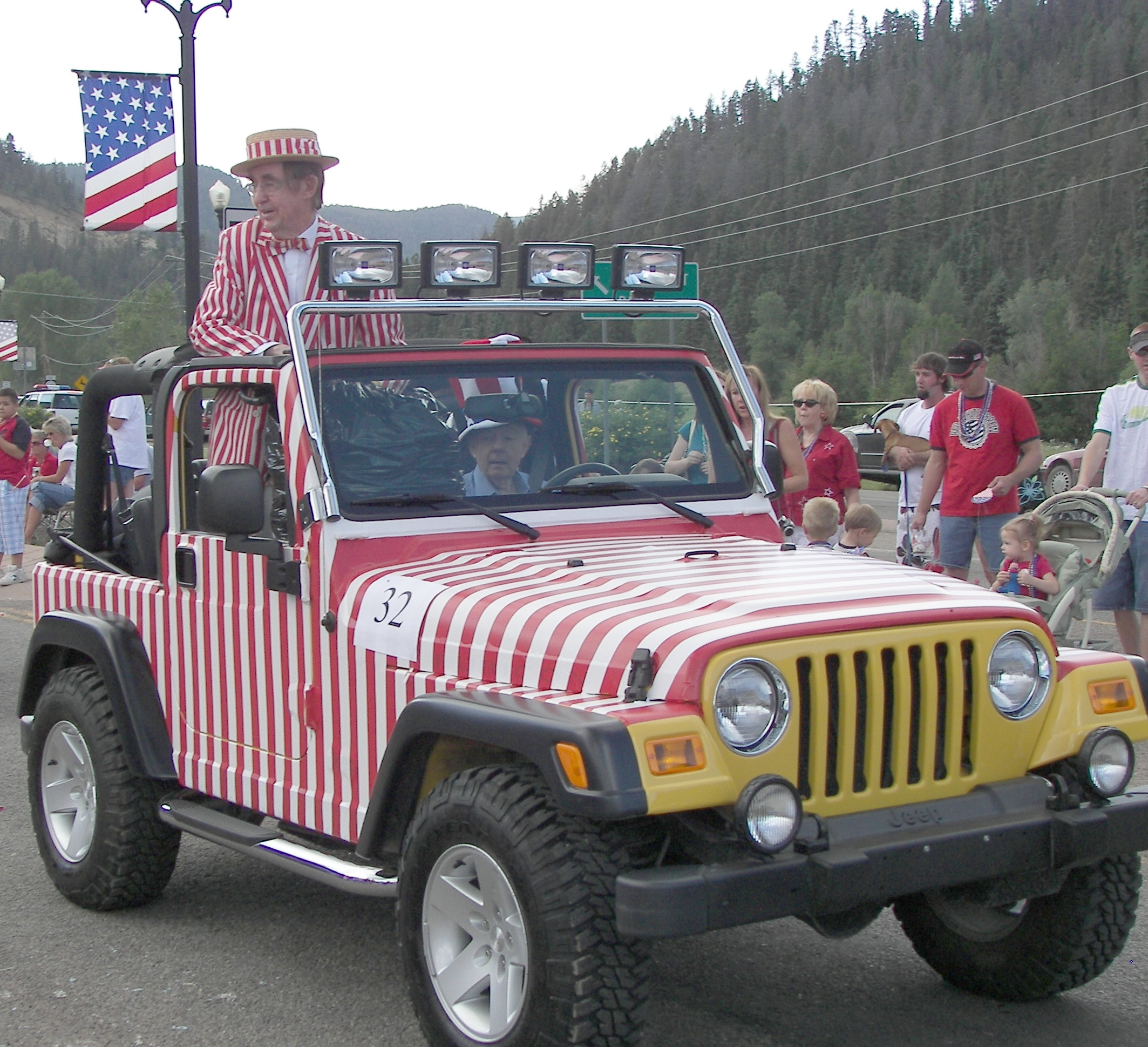
Haynes in the 2007 Red River, New Mexico Fourth of July parade, riding in his trademark Jeep Wrangler painted with candy stripes

Most of Haynes' film career was in made-for-television films, especially those set in his native Texas. His first film role was in the 1981 docudrama Crisis at Central High, about the integration of Little Rock's Central High School, filmed in Dallas. Texas-themed films in which he has appeared—mostly based on true stories—include Houston: The Legend of Texas (1986), A Killing in a Small Town (1990, aka Evidence of Love), Bonnie & Clyde: The True Story (1992), Texas Justice (1995), Don't Look Back (1996), and It's in the Water (1997).

His chief feature film roles included 1984's Places in the Heart, as Deputy Jack Driscoll, and in the 1985 Patsy Cline biopic Sweet Dreams as Owen Bradley, Cline's record producer. He also played minor roles in RoboCop (1987) and Boys Don't Cry (1999).

He also appeared as himself, partly through archive footage, in four documentary films discussing the Kennedy assassination: Rush to Judgment (1967), 11-22-63: The Day the Nation Cried (1989), Stalking the President: A History of American Assassins (1992), and Image of an Assassination: A New Look at the Zapruder Film (1998).

In 1996 the Lone Star Film & Television Awards honored him with a Lifetime Achievement Award. He regularly appeared in the Red River, New Mexico, Fourth of July parade in a candy-striped Jeep.

== Health ==
Haynes was diagnosed with Parkinson's disease in early 2008, and then was later diagnosed with a heart condition for which he received an artificial pacemaker. His doctors later revised their opinions to determine that he had a less aggressive form of Parkinson's. Haynes died on September 26, 2011, from complications due to the diseases. He was 84.

== Partial filmography ==
- Places in the Heart (1984) – Deputy Jack Driscoll
- Sweet Dreams (1985) – Owen Bradley
- Papa Was a Preacher (1985) – Jack Murphy
- RoboCop (1987) – Dr. McNamara
- Heartbreak Hotel (1988) – Mr. Hansen
- Hard Promises (1991) – Walt's Dad
- Steele's Law (1991) – Ben Slade
- Bonnie & Clyde: The True Story (1992) – Arvin
- My Boyfriend's Back (1993) – Minister At Funeral
- Walker, Texas Ranger (1993–2001) – Hank Sweet / Judge Abe Stiegler
- The Stars Fell on Henrietta (1995) – George (farmer #2)
- It's in the Water (1997) – Mr. Adams
- The Locusts (1997) – Harlan
- Possums (1998) – Bob
- The Outfitters (1999) – Father John
- Abilene (1999) – Pete
- Boys Don't Cry (1999) – Judge
- The Keyman (2002) – Canman
- Balls Out: Gary the Tennis Coach (2009) – Stringerman (final film role)
