= Fred E. Haynes Jr. =

U.S. Marine Corps Major General

Fred Elmore Haynes Jr.
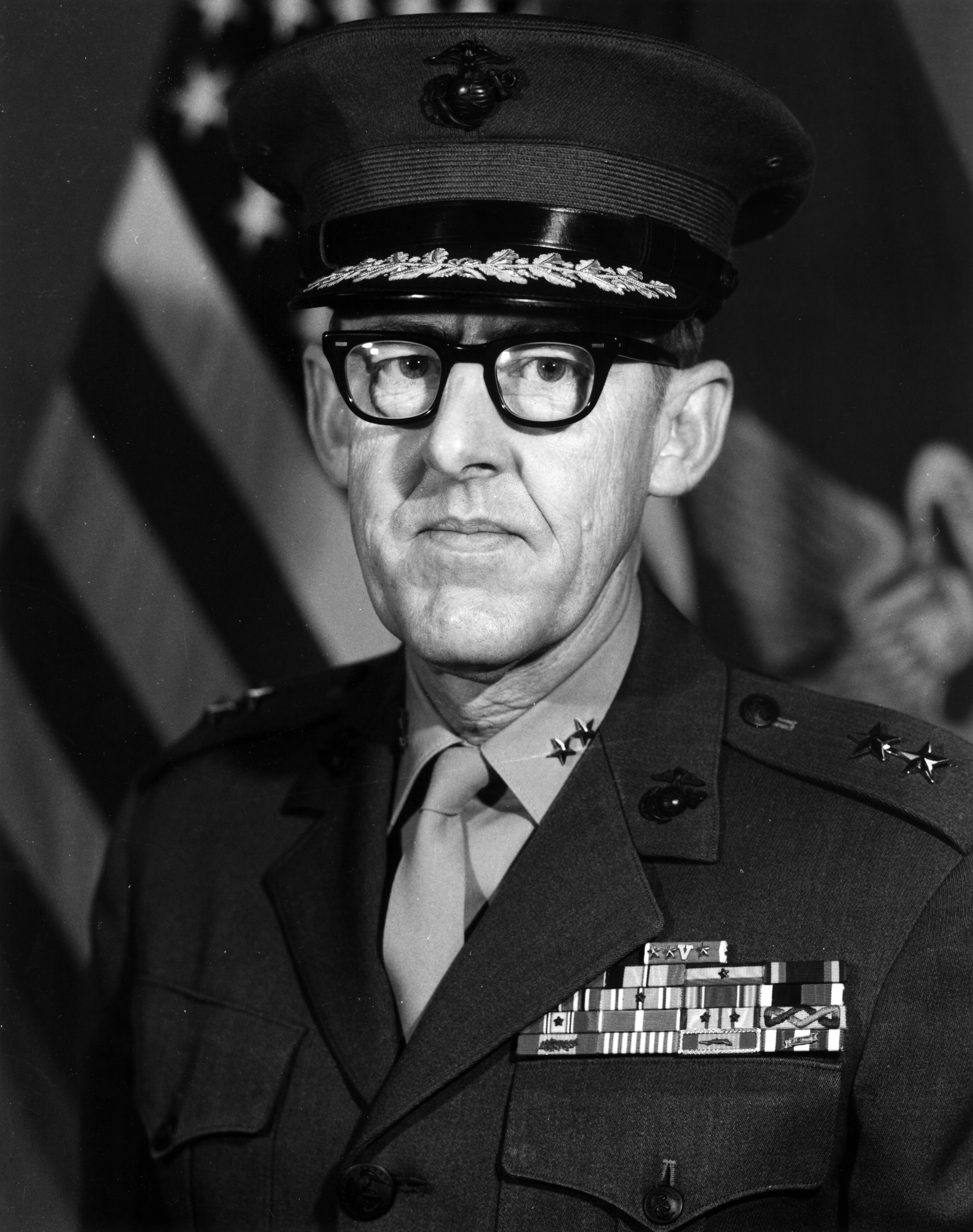
- Major General Fred E. Haynes Jr., USMC
- Born: January 5, 1921; Dallas, Texas, US
- Died: March 25, 2010 (aged 89); New York City, US
- Burial place: Arlington National Cemetery
- Relatives: Jerry Haynes (brother); Gibby Haynes (nephew); Vance A. Larson (brother-in-law)
- Military career
- Allegiance: United States of America
- Branch: United States Marine Corps
- Service years: 1942–1977
- Rank: Major general
- Service number: 0-10728
- Commands: Camp Lejeune; 3rd Marine Division; 2nd Marine Division; 5th Marine Regiment
- Conflicts: World War II: Battle of Iwo Jima; Vietnam War: Operation Desoto
- Awards: Legion of Merit (4) w/ Combat "V"; Bronze Star Medal w/ Combat "V"; Combat Action Ribbon

Fred Elmore Haynes Jr. (January 5, 1921 – March 25, 2010) was a United States Marine Corps major general who served in World War II and the Vietnam War. He completed his Marine Corps career as deputy chief of staff for Research, Development and Studies at Headquarters Marine Corps. He was the older brother of actor and Dallas television personality Jerry Haynes, aka Mr. Peppermint, and uncle of musician and artist Gibby Haynes.

== Early years ==
Fred E. Haynes was born on January 5, 1921, in Dallas, Texas, as the son of Fred E. Haynes Sr. and Louise Schimelpfenig. He had four siblings: Jerry, William, Hal and sister Mary Louise. He spent his childhood in Plano, Texas, where his maternal grandfather Frederick Schimelpfenig served as mayor and later operated a grocery store. He attended Plano High School and following the graduation in summer of 1937, he enrolled in Southern Methodist University in Dallas. Haynes was active in football and track teams during his time at the university and was the vice president of Delta Phi Alpha fraternity in his senior year. He graduated in June 1941 with a Bachelor of Science degree in biology.

== Military career ==
=== World War II ===
Following his graduation, he worked as reporter for The Dallas Morning News, but after the Japanese attack on Pearl Harbor in December 1941, he decided to volunteer for the military service. Haynes entered the Marine Corps Reserve as private on March 13, 1942, and was attached to Reserve Officers' Class at Officer Candidates School at Quantico Base, Virginia.

He completed the course on June 13, 1942, and was commissioned second lieutenant on that date. He subsequently attended the Platoon Leaders Course in August of that year and then accepted regular commission. Haynes was then appointed an instructor and platoon leader at Quantico and took part in the training of new officers. During his duties there, he was promoted to the rank of first lieutenant in February 1943.

Haynes was transferred to Camp Pendleton, California in February 1944 and attached to the newly activated 28th Marine Regiment under the command of former Marine Raider (the "Raiders" were disbanded in February 1944), Colonel Harry B. Liversedge. He was promoted to the rank of captain one month later and appointed regimental assistant to the regimental operations officer, Major Oscar F. Peatross. Haynes subsequently took part in the extensive training and finally sailed to the Pacific theater in early October 1944, reaching Hawaii during the same month. The 28th Marines were stationed at Camp Tarawa and conducted amphibious training for the next four months.

In late December, the 28th Marines embarked upon amphibious transports for Iwo Jima as part of the 5th Marine Division under Major General Keller E. Rockey, and after a few days liberty in Pearl Harbor they set sail heading west on January 7, 1945. The regiment stopped at Eniwetok on February 5, conducted a practice landing on Tinian on February 13 and arrived off the coast of Iwo Jima on February 16. Haynes landed with the assault troops on Green Beach in the morning of February 19. Haynes participated in the planning of the 28th Marines fight to isolate Mount Suribachi. The regiment fought to secure Mount Suribachi until the morning of February 23, when the mountain was captured and a flag raised on top of the summit by a patrol from E Company, 2nd Battalion, 28th Marines. Haynes remained with the regiment in the combat area until the battle was over at the end of March . He was awarded the Bronze Star Medal with Combat "V" for his actions as operations manager for the regiment and the Navy Presidential Unit Citation ribbon.

== Postwar service ==
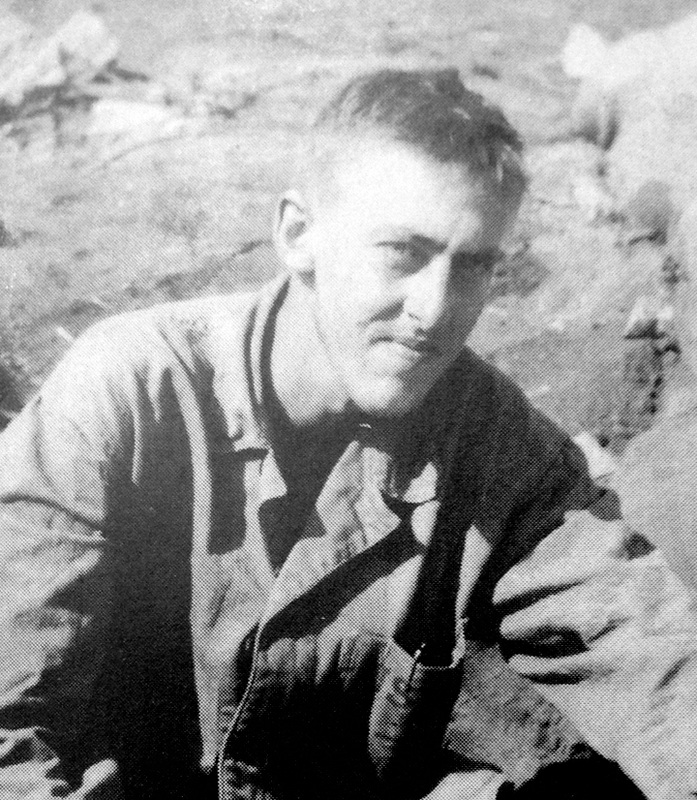
Fred E. Haynes Jr. shown here as captain during the Battle of Iwo Jima in February 1945.

Following Iwo Jima, the 28th Marines sailed back for Hawaii in order to prepare for the Invasion of Japan, but the surrender of the Empire at the beginning of September 1945 changed their plans. Haynes subsequently sailed to Japan with his regiment and took part in the occupation duties at Sasebo. The 28th Marines were ordered back to the United States for deactivation in December and Haynes was transferred to the 6th Marine Regiment under Colonel James P. Berkeley, where he served as Operations officer of 1st then 3rd Battalions.

Haynes returned to the United States in August 1946 and decided to remain on active service. He was ordered to Washington, D.C., for duty at Headquarters Marine Corps with the division of Plans and Policies and served in that capacity under Brigadier General Gerald C. Thomas until June 1949, when he was promoted to the rank of major and transferred back to his native Texas.

He then spent three years as associate professor of naval science at the University of Texas at Austin and was ordered for instruction to the Amphibious Warfare School at Quantico, Virginia, in June 1952. Upon the completion of the school in June 1953, Haynes was transferred to Japan and appointed Combat Intelligence Officer at the staff of 3rd Marine Division under Major General Robert H. Pepper. From March until September 1954, Haynes served as executive officer of 2nd Battalion, 1st Marines in South Korea and took part in the defense of the Korean Demilitarized Zone.

Upon his return to the United States, Haynes was ordered to the Little Creek Naval Amphibious Base and appointed Operations Officer of 2nd Combat Service Group within Force Troops, Fleet Marine Force, Atlantic under Brigadier General Francis B. Loomis. The Force Troops was responsible for all independent units under Fleet Marine Force, Atlantic such as support artillery units, anti-aircraft artillery units, military police battalions, separate engineer units and other miscellaneous force units. Haynes was promoted to the rank of lieutenant colonel in December 1954 and assumed command of Field Maintenance Battalion within this command.

In November 1956, Haynes was ordered to Washington, D.C., and attended Turkish studies at Foreign Service Institute. He was then transferred to Headquarters Marine Corps and served as Special Projects Officer within Operations Division. Haynes was transferred to Ankara, Turkey, in May 1958 and served as Assistant Naval Attache for Air at the American Embassy under Raymond A. Hare. He was also present in Turkey during the 1960 Turkish coup d'état and served as the principal contact between the embassy and the Turkish military.

Following his return to the United States, Haynes was ordered for instruction to Air War College at Maxwell Air Force Base, Alabama. He graduated with honors in June 1962 and assumed duties as head of Combat Intelligence Requirements and Readiness Branch, Intelligence Division at Headquarters Marine Corps under Major General Robert E. Cushman. While in this capacity, Haynes was promoted to the rank of colonel in July 1963. During his time in Washington, Haynes earned M.A. degree in international affairs from George Washington University in January 1963.

He was ordered to the Office of Assistant Secretary of Defense for International Security Affairs under John McNaughton and served on the Policy Planning Staff as special assistant to the principal deputy and then director of Near Eastern and South Asian Affairs at the Pentagon until October 1966. Haynes was decorated with the Legion of Merit in this capacity.

== Vietnam War era ==
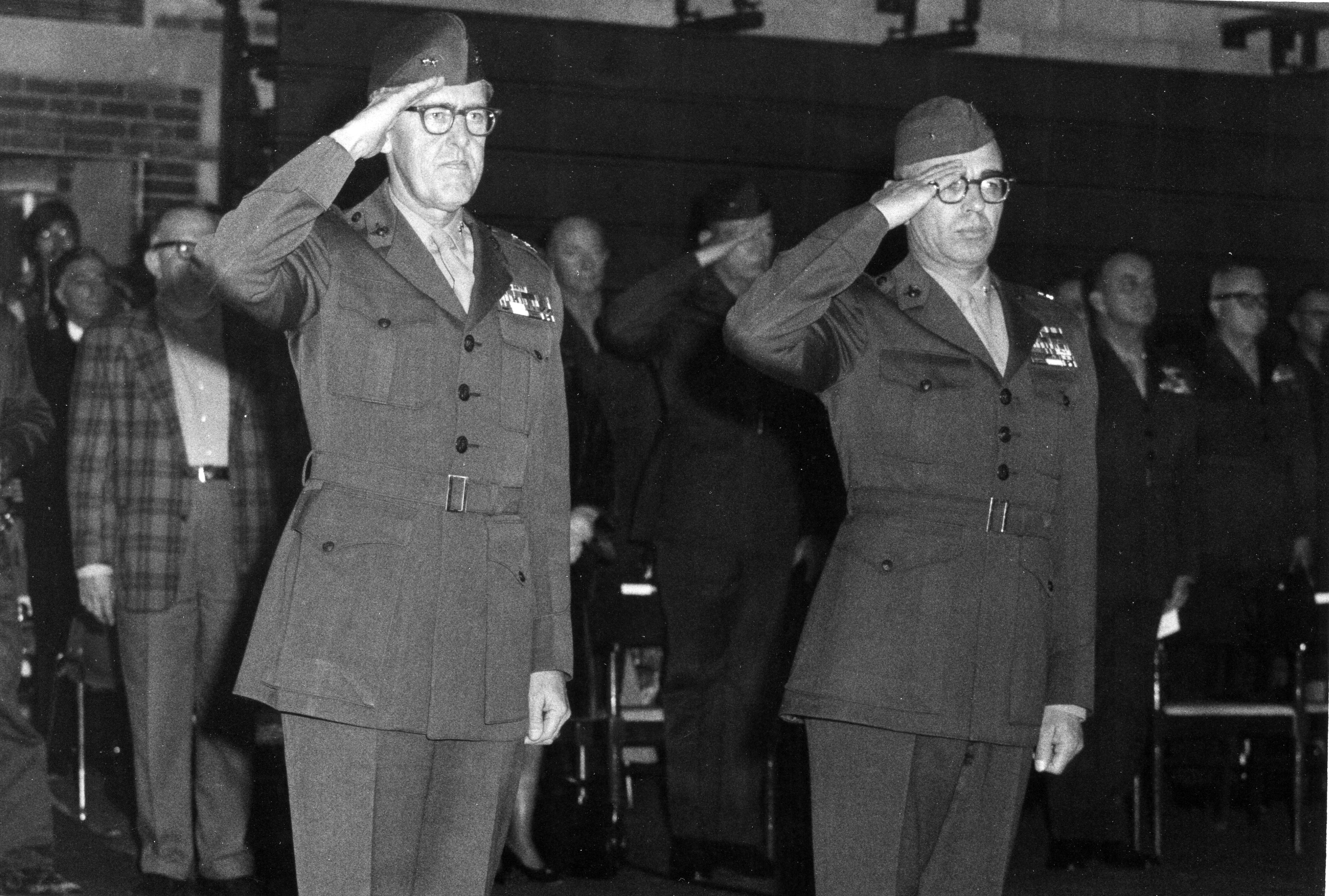
Second Marine Division Change of Command ceremony. Haynes (left) and his successor, Brig. Gen. Arthur J. Poillon.

Haynes arrived in South Vietnam in December 1966 and relieved Colonel Charles F. Widdecke as commanding officer of 5th Marine Regiment, 1st Marine Division at Chu Lai Base Area. He was subsequently appointed Chief of Staff of Task Force X-Ray, which was composed of the 1st and 3rd Battalion, 5th Marines and the 1st Battalion, 3rd Marines under the command of Brigadier General William A. Stiles. Haynes helped plan Operation Desoto, a search and destroy operation in Quang Ngai Province directed against North Vietnamese strongholds in that region. Haynes was decorated with his second Legion of Merit (with Combat "V") for his service in that capacity and also received his second Navy Presidential Unit Citation award.

He then assumed duty as operations officer on the staff of III Marine Amphibious Force under his old superior, Lieutenant General Robert E. Cushman and took part in the planning of III MAF Operations until November 13, 1967, when he was ordered back to the United States. Haynes received his third Legion of Merit for his service with III MAF and several South Vietnamese awards.

Following a brief leave at home, Haynes assumed duties as Military Secretary to the Commandant of the Marine Corps, General Leonard F. Chapman, Jr., who had just been appointed to office. In this capacity, he served as the senior advisor, task manager and oversaw the day-to-day operations of the Office of the Commandant, as well as supervised the schedule of the commandant, and performed other duties as the commandant may direct. Haynes remained in this capacity until September 1, 1968, when he was promoted to the rank of brigadier general and appointed legislative assistant to the commandant.

Haynes was promoted to the rank of major general on September 8, 1971, and assumed command of the 2nd Marine Division at Camp Lejeune, North Carolina, three weeks later. He held command of the division until January 1973, when he received transfer orders for Korea for duty as senior member of the United Nations Command, Military Armistice Commission in Korea and his duty was to supervise the Korean Armistice Agreement.

He was transferred to Okinawa on September 1, 1973, and assumed command of the 3rd Marine Division, which served as the defense force of the Far Eastern Area. Haynes was ordered back to the United States at the end of August 1974 and received the Korean Order of National Security Merit, 3rd Class for his service in Korea and Japan.

Haynes served as the commanding general of Camp Lejeune until the end of August 1975 and then began his last tour of duty as deputy chief of staff for research, development and studies at Headquarters Marine Corps. He retired from the Marine Corps after almost 35 years of service on January 1, 1977.

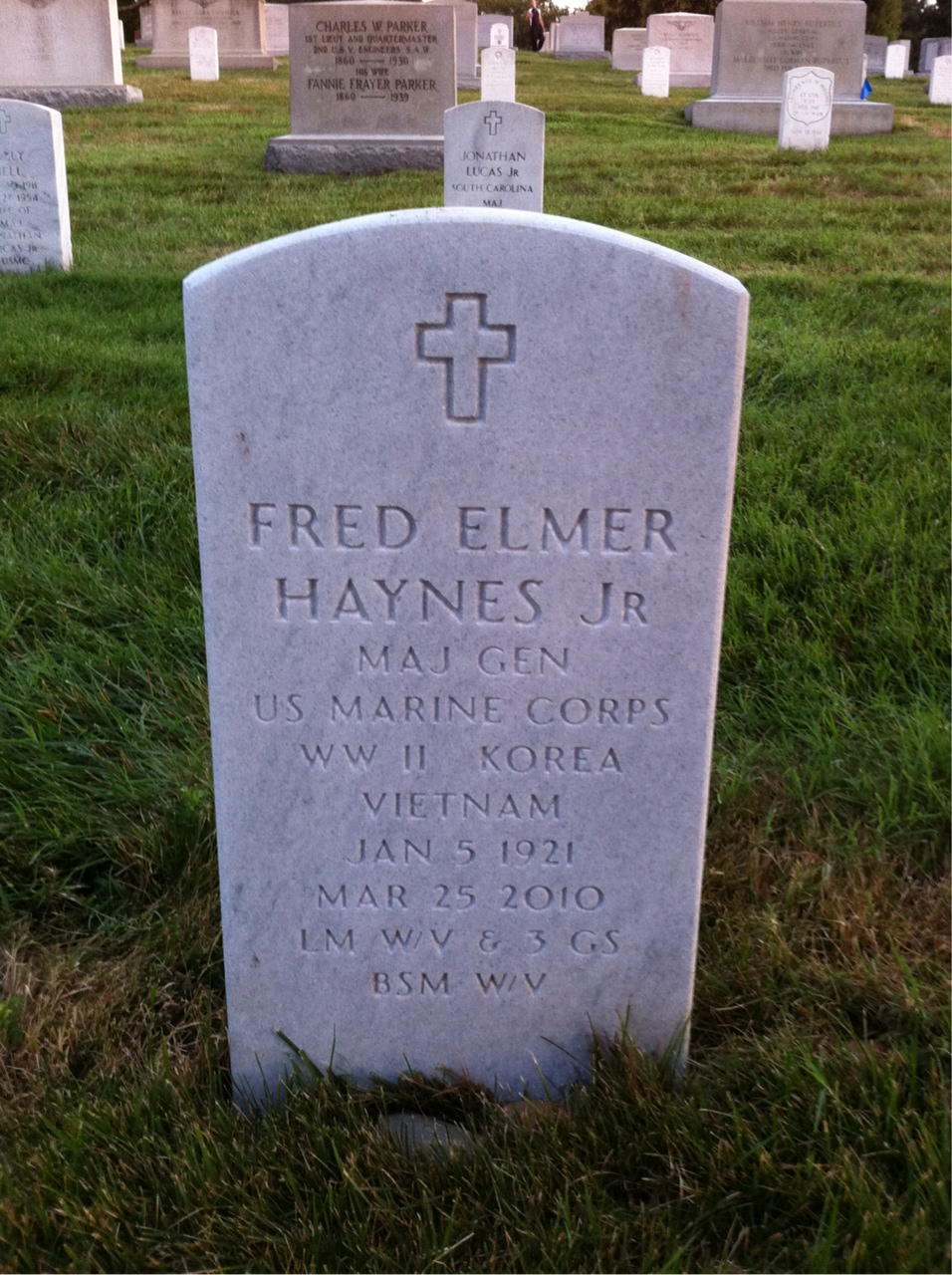
Haynes' headstone at Arlington National Cemetery

== Later life ==
Haynes settled in Washington, D.C., for 20 years before moving to New York City. He was the first Marine officer elected to the Council on Foreign Relations. He also served as chairman emeritus of American-Turkish Council and founded the Iwo Jima Association of America. He is co-author of the book: The Lions of Iwo Jima: The Story of Combat Team 28 and the Bloodiest Battle in Marine Corps History.

Because of his experience with POW at the end of World War II, he was the strong advocate of humane treatment of all prisoners, not only because he believed "it was the moral thing to do", but also because humane treatment often provided valuable intelligence at a time when the lives of servicemen and women depended on it. He also advised presidential candidates, as well as sitting presidents, on the treatment of those captured during battle.

Major General Fred Elmore Haynes Jr. died on March 25, 2010, in New York City and is buried at Arlington National Cemetery, Virginia. He is survived by his wife, Bonnie Arnold Haynes, and three children from his first marriage: Karen Francis Haynes, who is a research bio-chemist, and twin boys Fred Elmore Haynes and William Lane Haynes, who are lawyers.

== Military awards ==
MG Haynes' military decorations and awards:

Legion of Merit with 3 Gold Stars and Combat "V"	Bronze Star Medal with Combat "V"	Combat Action Ribbon	Navy Presidential Unit Citation with 1 bronze star
Navy Unit Commendation	American Campaign Medal	Asiatic-Pacific Campaign Medal with 1 bronze star	World War II Victory Medal
Navy Occupation Service Medal	National Defense Service Medal with 1 bronze star	Korean Service Medal (Note: Awarded during the period between June 25, 1950 and July 27, 1954)	Vietnam Service Medal with 2 bronze stars
Korea Defense Service Medal (Note: Awarded from July 28, 1954 to a date to be determined)	Republic of Korea Order of National Security Merit	Republic of Vietnam Gallantry Cross with Palm	Republic of Vietnam Army Distinguished Service Order, 2nd Class
Republic of Vietnam Gallantry Cross Unit Citation with Palm	Republic of Vietnam Civil Actions Unit Citation with Palm	United Nations Korea Medal	Republic of Vietnam Campaign Medal with 1960- device

== See also ==
- Battle of Iwo Jima
- Jerry Haynes

Military offices
Preceded by Robert D. Bohn	Commanding General of the Camp Lejeune; September 1, 1974 - August 30, 1975	Succeeded by Herman Poggemeyer Jr.
Preceded by Michael P. Ryan	Commanding General of the 3rd Marine Division; September 1, 1973 - August 22, 1974	Succeeded by Kenneth J. Houghton
Preceded by Robert D. Bohn	Commanding General of the 2nd Marine Division; September 29, 1971 - January 9, 1973	Succeeded by Arthur J. Poillon
