= Robert C. Burke =

United States Marine and Medal of Honor recipient

Robert Charles Burke
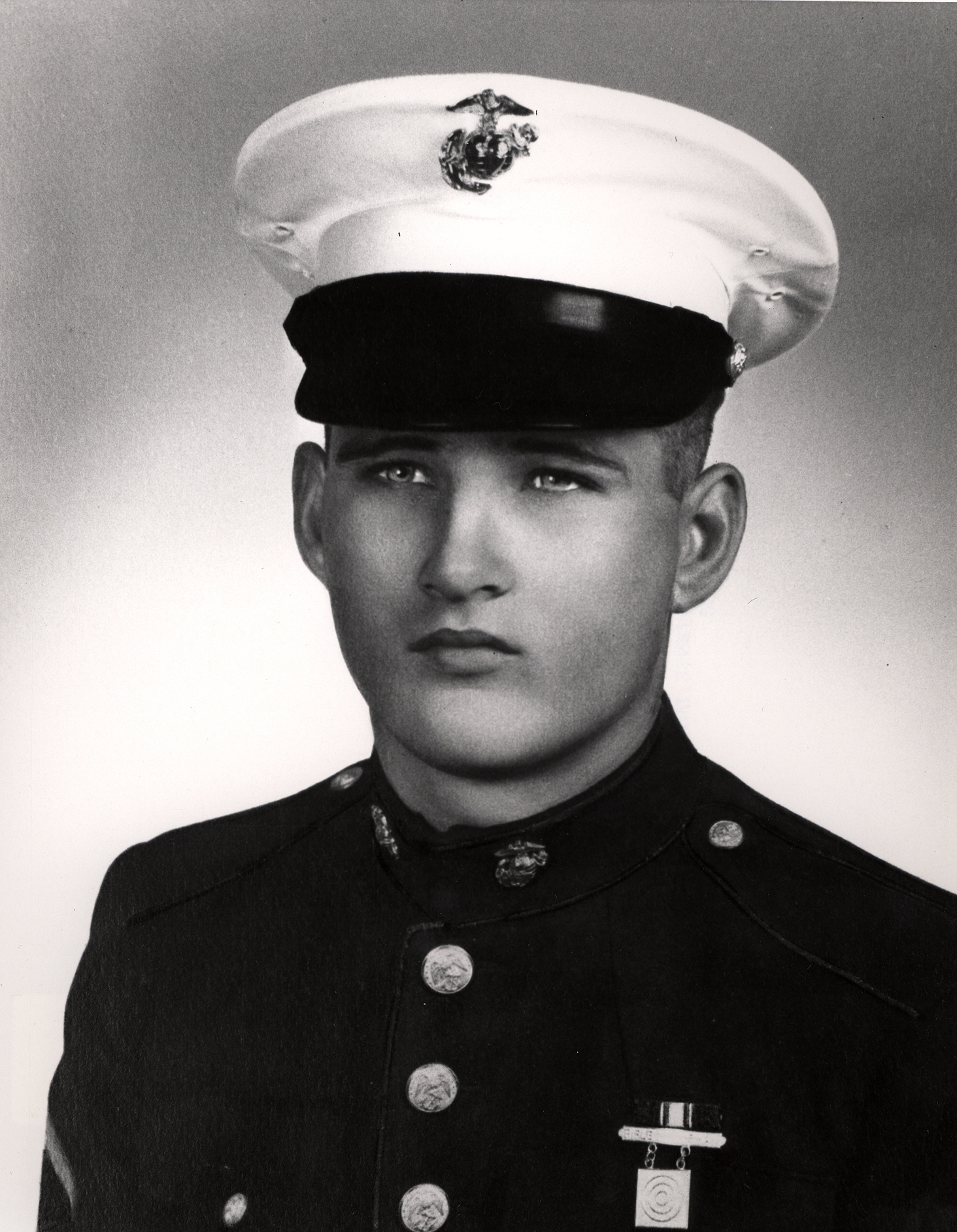
- Robert C. Burke
- Born: November 7, 1949; Monticello, Illinois, U.S.
- Died: May 17, 1968 (aged 18); Go Noi Island, Quảng Nam Province, South Vietnam
- Burial place: Monticello Cemetery, Monticello, Illinois
- Military career
- Allegiance: United States
- Branch: United States Marine Corps
- Service years: 1967–1968
- Rank: Private First Class
- Units: Company I, 3rd Battalion, 27th Marine Regiment, 1st Marine Division
- Conflicts: Vietnam War: Operation Allen Brook †
- Awards: Medal of Honor; Purple Heart; Military Merit Medal (South Vietnam); Gallantry Cross (South Vietnam)

Robert Charles Burke (November 7, 1949 – May 17, 1968) was a United States Marine who was killed in action during the Vietnam War and was posthumously awarded the Medal of Honor. Private First Class Burke, at age 18, was the youngest Medal of Honor recipient of the Vietnam War.

== Early life ==
Burke was born on November 7, 1949, in Monticello, Illinois. While still a student at Monticello High School, he enlisted in the U.S. Marine Corps Reserve in Chicago, March 17, 1967. Burke was discharged to enlist in the regular Marine Corps on May 16, 1967.

== United States Marine Corps ==
Upon completion of recruit training with the 1st Recruit Training Battalion, Recruit Training Regiment, Marine Corps Recruit Depot, San Diego, California, on July 20, 1967, Burke was transferred to the Marine Corps Base, Camp Pendleton, California. He completed individual combat training with Company Q, 2nd Battalion, 2nd Infantry Training Regiment, in August 1967, and was promoted to private first class on September 1, 1967. From September 1967 until January 1968, he was a student with the Motor Transport School, Student Company, Schools Battalion. This was followed by duty as a motor vehicle mechanic with Headquarters and Service Company, 5th Military Police Battalion, 5th Marine Division, Camp Pendleton.

In February 1968, Burke was sent to the Republic of Vietnam where he was assigned to Company I, 3rd Battalion, 27th Marines, 1st Marine Division (Reinforced) as a machine gunner. Burke was killed in action charging enemy positions on May 17, 1968, while on Operation Allen Brook with Company I, in the hamlet of Le Nam, Go Noi Island in Southern Quảng Nam Province.

Burke is buried in Monticello Cemetery, in Monticello, Illinois.

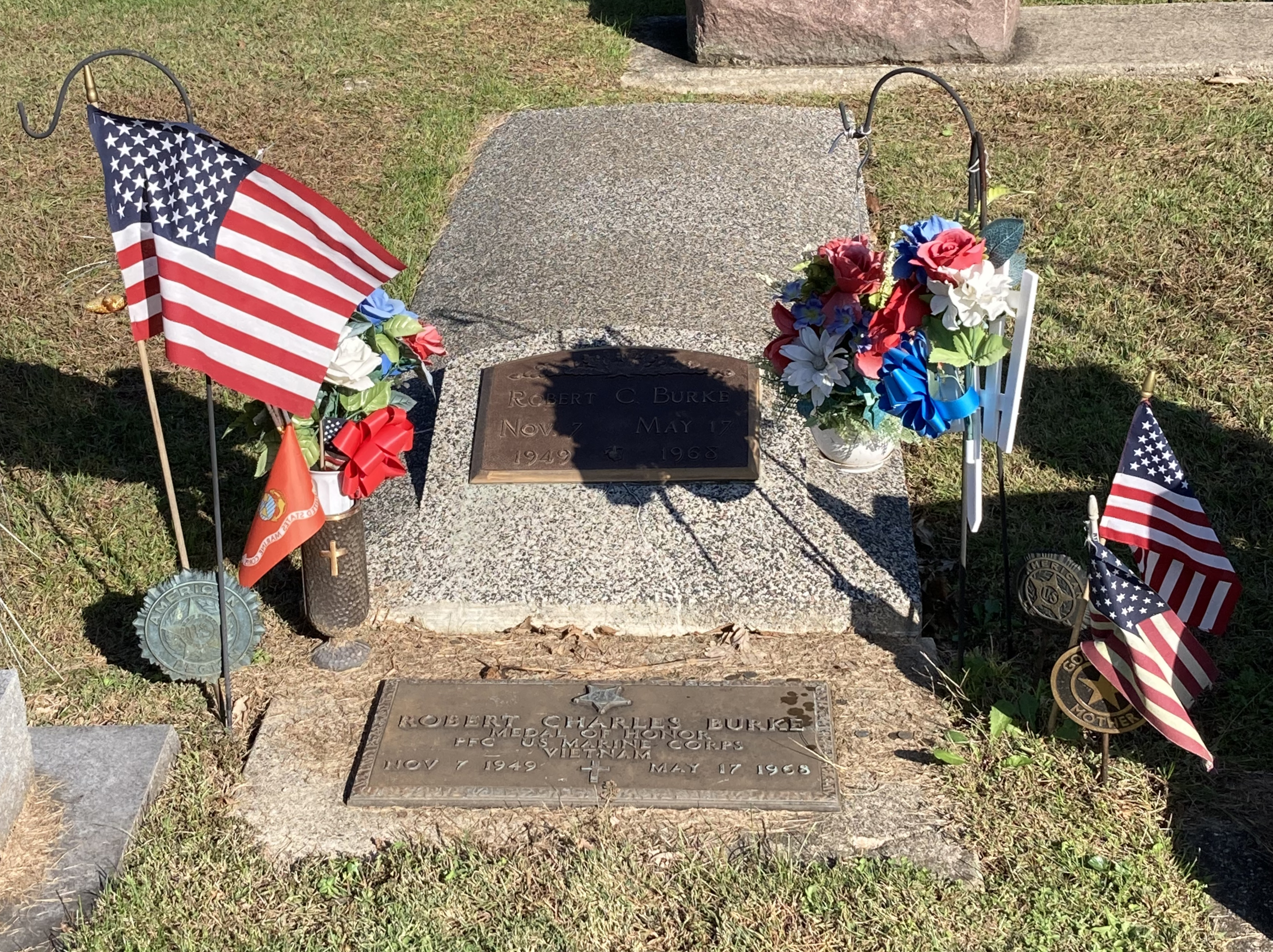
Burke's grave

== Medal of Honor citation ==
The President of the United States in the name of The Congress takes pride in presenting the MEDAL OF HONOR posthumously to

PRIVATE FIRST CLASS ROBERT C. BURKE
UNITED STATES MARINE CORPS

for service as set forth in the following CITATION:

For conspicuous gallantry and intrepidity at the risk of his life above and beyond the call of duty for service as a Machine Gunner with Company I, Third Battalion, Twenty Seventh Marines, First Marine Division in the Republic of Vietnam on May 17, 1968. While on Operation ALLEN BROOK, Company I was approaching a dry river bed with a heavily wooded treeline that bordered the hamlet of Le Nam (1), when they suddenly came under intense mortar, rocket propelled grenades, automatic weapons and small arms fire from a large, well concealed enemy force which halted the company's advance and wounded several Marines. Realizing that key points of resistance had to be eliminated to allow the units to advance and casualties to be evacuated, Private First Class Burke, without hesitation, seized his machine gun and launched a series of one man assaults against the fortified emplacement. As he aggressively maneuvered to the edge of the steep river bank, he delivered accurate suppressive fire upon several enemy bunkers, which enabled his comrades to advance and move the wounded Marines to positions of relative safety. As he continued his combative actions, he located an opposing automatic weapons emplacement and poured intense fire into the position, killing three North Vietnamese soldiers as they attempted to flee. Private First Class Burke then fearlessly moved from one position to another, quelling the hostile fire until his weapon malfunctioned. Obtaining a casualty's rifle and hand grenades, he advanced further into the midst of the enemy. Observing that a fellow Marine had cleared his malfunctioning machine gun he grasped his weapon and moved into a dangerously exposed area and saturated the hostile treeline until he fell mortally wounded. Private First Class Burke's gallant actions upheld the highest traditions of the Marine Corps and the United States Naval Service. He gallantly gave his life for his country.

/S/ RICHARD M. NIXON

== Military decorations & awards ==
Burke's service ribbons include:

	Medal of Honor	
Purple Heart Medal	National Defense Service Medal	Vietnam Service Medal with service star
Military Merit Medal (South Vietnam)	Gallantry Cross with Palm (South Vietnam)	Vietnam Campaign Medal with 1960– bar (South Vietnam)

== Legacy ==
The name Robert Charles Burke is inscribed on the Vietnam Veterans Memorial ("The Wall") in Washington, D.C., on Panel 61E, Line 024.

Robert C. Burke Memorial Park in Monticello, Illinois, his hometown, is named in his honor.

== See also ==
- List of Medal of Honor recipients
- List of Medal of Honor recipients for the Vietnam War
