= John N. McLaughlin =

U.S. Marine Corps Lieutenant General

John Nicholas McLaughlin
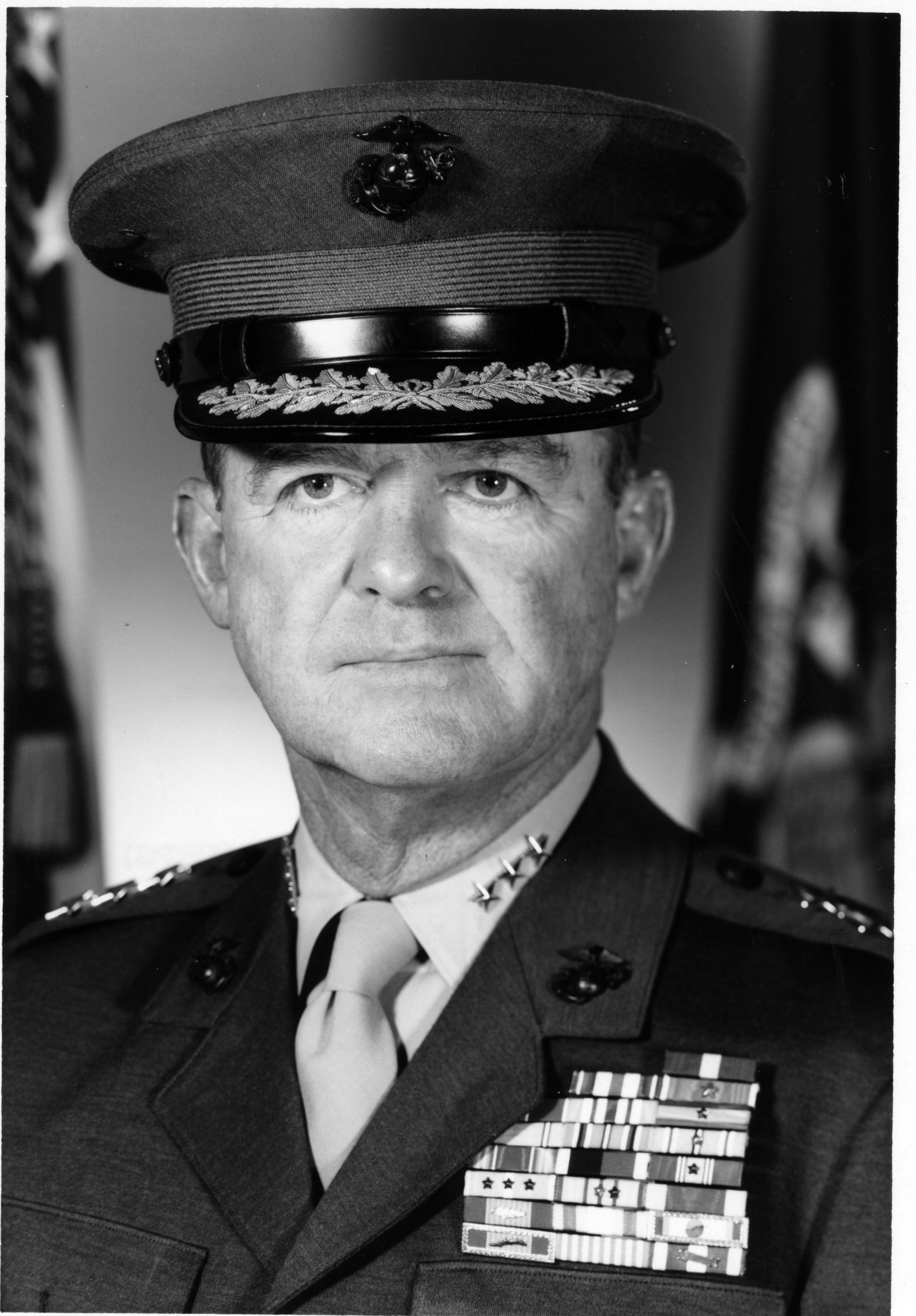
- LTG John N. McLaughlin, USMC
- Born: September 21, 1918; Charleston, South Carolina, US
- Died: August 8, 2002 (aged 83); Savannah, Georgia, US
- Burial place: Beaufort National Cemetery
- Military career
- Allegiance: United States
- Branch: United States Marine Corps
- Service years: 1941–1977
- Rank: Lieutenant general
- Nickname: "Jack"
- Service number: 0-8433
- Commands: Fleet Marine Force, Pacific; Chief of Staff, HQMC; MCRD San Diego; 4th Marine Division
- Conflicts: World War II: Battle of Guadalcanal; New Guinea campaign; Battle of Cape Gloucester; Battle of Peleliu; Korean War: Battle of P'ohang-dong; Battle of Chosin Reservoir; Vietnam War: Tet Offensive
- Awards: Distinguished Service Medal (2); Silver Star; Legion of Merit (3); Bronze Star Medal

John Nicholas McLaughlin (September 21, 1918 – August 8, 2002) was a highly decorated officer of the United States Marine Corps with the rank of lieutenant general. During his 33 years of active service, McLaughlin was a participant of wars in the Pacific, Korea and Vietnam. He was taken prisoner during the Korean War and spent almost three years in Chinese captivity. McLaughlin finished his career as commanding general of Fleet Marine Force, Pacific.

== Early years and World War II ==
John N. McLaughlin was born on September 21, 1918, in Charleston, South Carolina; however, his family moved to Savannah, Georgia, when he was four years old. McLaughlin later attended the Benedictine Military School there and following his graduation in 1936 enrolled at Emory University in Atlanta, Georgia. He also entered the Georgia National Guard at the same time.

Upon his graduation in June 1941 with a Bachelor of Arts degree, McLaughlin entered active Marine Corps service and was assigned to the Officer Candidates School at Marine Barracks Quantico, Virginia. He completed the five months course and was commissioned as a second lieutenant on November 1, 1941.

He was subsequently attached to Company "C", 1st Battalion, 5th Marines under famous Lieutenant Colonel Merritt "Red Mike" Edson at Camp Lejeune, North Carolina.

His regiment sailed to the Southwest Pacific, arriving at Wellington, New Zealand on June 14, 1942. The 5th Marines spent the next two months with preparations for combat deployment, which occurred at the beginning of August 1942 with an amphibious landing on Guadalcanal. McLaughlin later took part in actions along the Matanikau River and was promoted to the rank of first lieutenant in October 1942. However the 5th Marines took heavy casualties and were ordered to Australia on December 9 of that year for rest and refit. Meanwhile, McLaughlin was promoted to the rank of captain in February 1943 and assumed command of "C" Company.

While in Australia, a lot of men under his command recuperated from Malaria and other wounds and McLaughlin oversaw the training of his company and preparations for their next amphibious operation. At the end of September 1943, the 5th Marines left Australia and sailed for Milne Bay, New Guinea for advanced training, emphasizing shore-to-shore operations and utilizing terrain closely resembling that on New Britain.

The 5th Marines were ordered to Cape Gloucester on December 29, with the mission to capture a large Japanese airdrome. After one airfield was captured, at the end of December, the 5th Marines began chasing retreating Japanese units. McLaughlin and his company proceeded to Natamo Point and overran the enemy's positions. He then took part in combat in the vicinity of Mount Schleuther and helped to clear the village Talasea at the beginning of March 1944.

After the area was declared secured, McLaughlin and his battalion moved to Pavuvu Island at the beginning of May 1944. After the next several months of training duties, the 5th Marines were designated as landing force for the upcoming Peleliu operation. Captain McLaughlin landed with his company on September 15, 1944, and during the first days of combat, "C" Company repelled two Japanese tank-infantry counterattacks, destroying several tanks and killing supporting infantry. During the next two weeks, McLaughlin and his company repeatedly assaulted heavily fortified enemy positions along the Peleliu Airfield and after four days of intensive fighting, he bravely led his company in an assault under heavy fire to repulse several night counterattacks in which two enemy machine guns were captured, numerous Japanese killed and many tanks put out of action. For his gallantry in action, McLaughlin was decorated with the Silver Star.

At the end of October 1944, 5th Marines were ordered back to Pavuvu for rest and refit. McLaughlin spent the next four weeks there and returned to the United States at the beginning of December of that year. After brief leave for Christmas, McLaughlin reported for duty at the staff of Marine Corps Schools Quantico under his old 1st Marine Division Commander, Major General William H. Rupertus. While served in that capacity, McLaughlin was promoted to the rank of major in February 1945.

== Postwar service and Korea ==
=== Early service ===
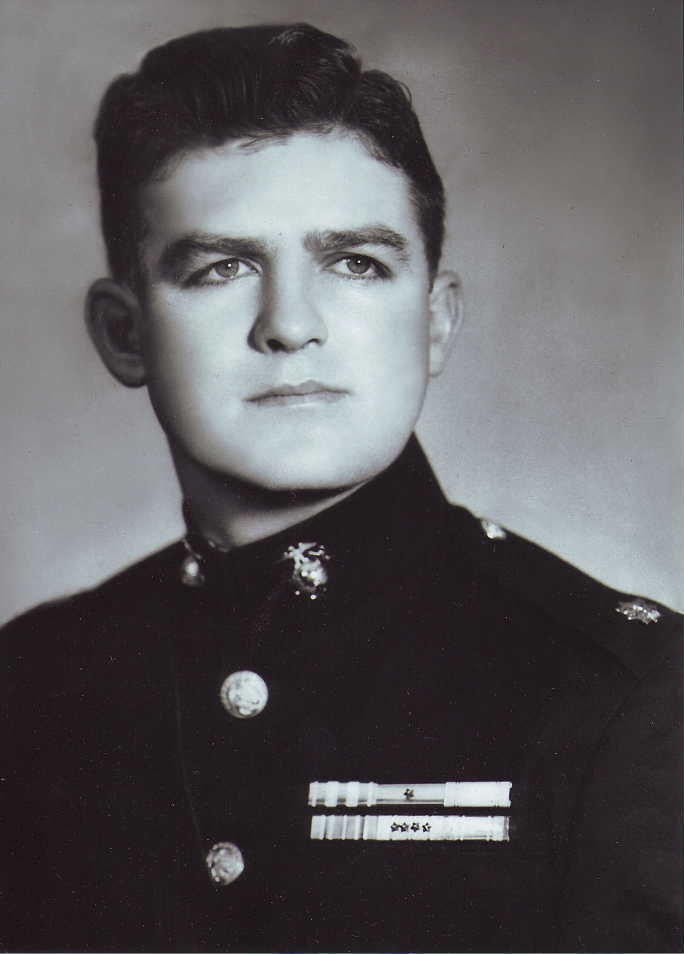
McLaughlin as Major following World War II

McLaughlin served at Quantico until spring 1948, when he was attached to the course at Army Infantry School at Fort Benning, Georgia. Upon graduation in June 1948, he was ordered to Naval Amphibious Base Coronado, California, where he was attached to the staff of Amphibious Training Command under Brigadier General John T. Walker.

As an officer with a great deal of experience in Amphibious warfare matters, McLaughlin was attached to Mobile Training Team Able under Colonel Edward H. Forney and ordered to Japan in January 1950. His duty was to train U.S. occupation forces in amphibious training. In July 1950, he was appointed an advisor with the 5th Cavalry Regiment and took part in the amphibious landing at P'ohang-dong during August 1950. McLaughlin subsequently received the Bronze Star Medal with Combat "V" for his leadership during the P'ohang-dong campaign.

=== Chinese captivity ===
McLaughlin was later appointed assistant to operations officer of X Army Corps under Lieutenant General Edward Almond and 1st Marine Division Liaison officer. During the Chosin Reservoir Campaign at the end of November 1950, McLaughlin was attached to the column of Task Force Drysdale which traveled to Hagaru-ri under the command of Lieutenant Colonel Arthur A. Chidester on November 29, 1950. The column was ambushed by the Chinese People's Volunteer Army and divided into several parts.

Although McLaughlin was originally just a passenger, he assumed command of his part of the column as a senior officer present. Because of the attacks from every direction, he quickly realized they were surrounded. Despite the hopelessness of his situation, McLaughlin calmed the troops down and ordered them to the proper places, where they could give the most firepower. He held out hope allied reinforcements would arrive at dawn, although it soon became obvious that was not going to happen. With no communication with other allied troops, almost no ammunition and a number of wounded men, McLaughlin decided to negotiate terms of surrender. He demanded that his wounded men be medically treated and handed over to the nearest American post. Although the Chinese commander agreed, McLaughlin intentionally delayed the surrender to allow more men to slip out of the perimeter undetected.

Major McLaughlin surrendered on November 30, 1950, and subsequently was forced to march with other Marines through freezing weather to the hills, where they were interrogated. Some of the wounded were moved to a nearby hut by the order of Chinese commander and later found by the U.S. forces. The rest of the wounded, those who were able to walk, were not treated by their captors but only captured U.S. Medical personnel provided some basic treatment.

They marched several days with a minimum of food and water, in freezing wind and snow. Several Marines died due to pneumonia and also malnutrition during the exhausting four days march. McLaughlin and his group of Marines, Army soldiers and several British commandos subsequently reached a Korean farmhouse somewhere in Chagang Province and stayed there until December 22. Subsequently, they marched for another four days until they reached the town of Kanggye in North Korea on December 26.

Not far from the town, they were all placed in a prisoner camp, which was also referred to as Kanggye. During the next days, another group of POWs came to the camp where the total number of prisoners was about 290. All prisoners struggled with the lack of food and disease and were continuously exposed to the communist indoctrination. McLaughlin began with establishing communications between scattered groups of prisoners. He issued instructions through non-commissioned officers in order to stick together and raise morale.

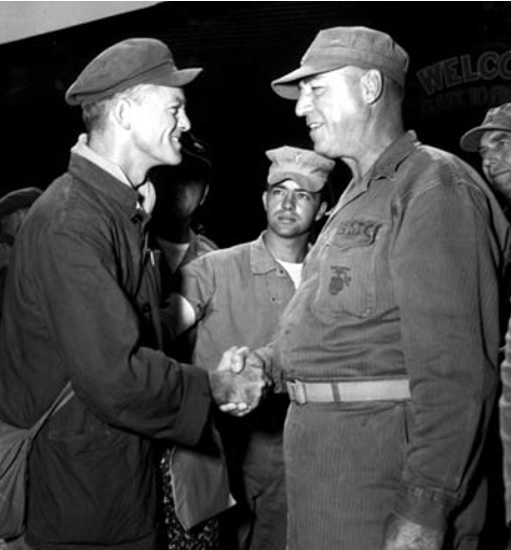
McLaughlin is greeted by BG Joseph C. Burger (Assistant Commander 1st Marine Division) following his release from captivity on September 5, 1953.

The communist indoctrination process lasted until the beginning of March 1951, when officers were gathered and sent to Pyoktong to the prisoner camp for officers referred as Camp 5. Under harsh conditions, with the absence of anything, prisoners died in large numbers. Even though McLaughlin was junior to some officers from the Army or Air Force at the camp, he was elected to represent them. Chinese administration of the camp quickly recognized him as the leader and concentrated their pressures on him. They offered him better living conditions and food if he would co-operate in propaganda matters. When he refused, the Chinese threatened him with death and beat him.

During July 1951, his family, which did not know anything about him since November 1950, was informed McLaughlin was still alive.

McLaughlin was transferred with some other officers to Camp 2 at Pu-Chong-Ni at the end of November 1951. Toward the end of the year, the Chinese camp commander ordered all U.N. prisoners to send New Year's greetings to communist general Peng Dehuai, who commanded all Chinese troops in North Korea at the time. McLaughlin refused to do so and organized Marine resistance within the camp prisoners. The Chinese camp commander ordered "court-martial" of all leaders. As a punishment, McLaughlin was sentenced to four months of solitary confinement.

During McLaughlin's absence, morale within Marine officers was at a very low state and also no discipline. In May 1952, Lieutenant Colonel William G. Thrash arrived at the camp and became the senior Marine officer. He succeeded McLaughlin, who was still in solitary confinement, and restored the discipline and morale. Meanwhile, McLaughlin was released from his custody and became Second-in-command. The Chinese had no understanding for Thrash's actions and put him in solitary confinement in September 1952. He was condemned to eight months in the "hole", and McLaughlin became leader of all the Marines again.

When the P.O.W. Olympics was established at the end of November 1952, McLaughlin was selected for the Camp 2 Athletic team. Even if he opposed the idea of P.O.W. Olympics, he competed, and his skill as an athlete helped restore the prestige of the officers torn down by the enemy's propaganda.

In March 1953, Chinese ordered the election of a camp chairman, which would be the Marine officer responsible for the cooking, police, recreation, and procurement of rations and fuel; in addition to which he was also responsible for the conduct of all POWs in camp. McLaughlin was elected to that capacity and during the next months, he established an athletic and physical conditioning program, which contributed greatly to morale.

As chairman, McLaughlin was sent to the POW conference in Pyoktong during May 1953. While at that conference, McLaughlin confronted general General Wang Yang Kung, commanding general of all prisoner of war camps, and demanded better living conditions and to cease persecution and imprisonment in solitary confinement of senior officers. As a result of his actions, Lieutenant Colonels Thrash and James Carne were released from their solitary cells.

Major McLaughlin was finally released from captivity on September 5, 1953, as a part of the Operation Big Switch, prisoner of war exchange. During his 1010 days of captivity, he suffered beatings, attempted brainwashing, four months of solitary confinement and lost 66 pounds. Lieutenant Colonel Thrash, who was repatriated at the same time, subsequently sent a report of McLaughlin's actions in prisoner of war camp to the Commandant of the Marine Corps and recommended him for a decoration. General Lemuel C. Shepherd Jr. approved his request, and McLaughlin was subsequently decorated with the Legion of Merit.

== Later service ==
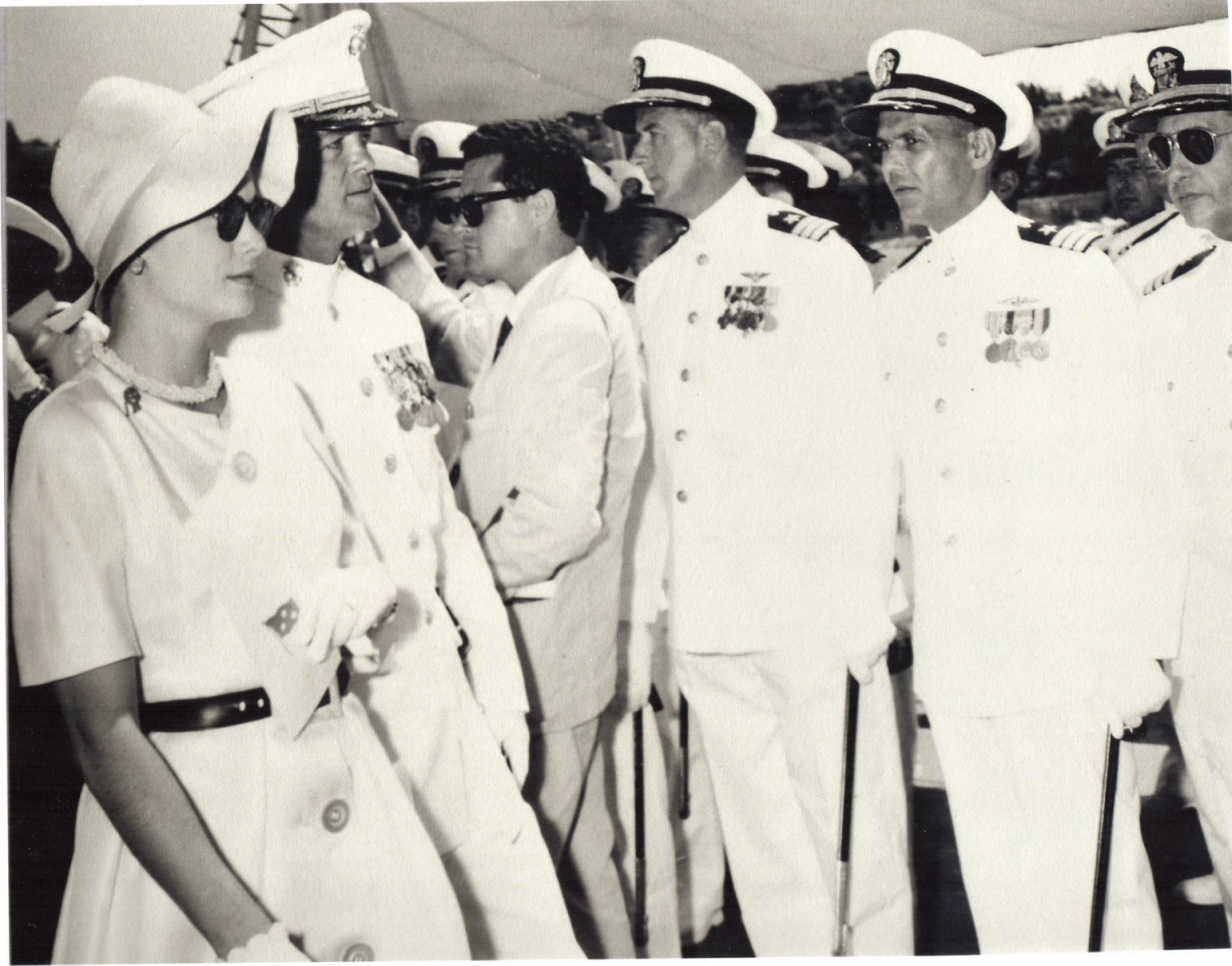
Commanding general of Fleet Marine Force Pacific, Lieutenant general McLaughlin escorting Princess Grace of Monaco during her visit to Hawaii.

Because of his medical condition, McLaughlin was also granted almost four months of medical leave. He was promoted to the rank of lieutenant colonel in December 1953, with date of rank from July 1, 1951. His new assignment was with the staff of Marine Corps Schools Quantico, which he knew well from his late World War II service.

McLaughlin also assumed command of his World War II, 1st Battalion, 5th Marines in September 1956. He was promoted to the rank of colonel on July 1, 1960, and transferred to the staff of United States Sixth Fleet under Vice Admiral George W. Anderson. He served in that capacity as fleet Marine officer and spent this time in Mediterranean Sea.

During 1961, McLaughlin returned to the United States and was ordered to Washington, D.C., where he assumed duties as Marine Corps aide to the United States Under Secretary of the Navy, Paul B. Fay.

McLaughlin's career slowly flourished, and he swapped one important assignment for another one. In early 1963, he was appointed Marine Corps liaison officer in the office of Chief of Naval Operations, where he served under his old superior from Sixth Fleet, Admiral Anderson. He also received the newly established Joint Service Commendation Medal for his service in that capacity.

While in Washington, D.C., McLaughlin was ordered to the Senior Course at National War College and subsequently also earned a master's degree in international affairs at George Washington University in July 1965. He subsequently assumed command of the 6th Marine Regiment at Camp Lejeune and served in that capacity until the end of December 1965.

McLaughlin subsequently assumed duties as chief of staff of the 2nd Marine Division under Major General Ormond R. Simpson, but did not go to South Vietnam and stayed stateside.

On January 10, 1967, he was promoted to the rank of brigadier general and appointed deputy chief of staff for Plans at the staff of United States Strike Command under General Theodore J. Conway. He distinguished himself again in this capacity, and received his second Legion of Merit.

Brigadier General McLaughlin finally received orders for deployment to Vietnam on February 18, 1968, when he was ordered to Danang and assumed duties as assistant division commander, 1st Marine Division under Major General Donn J. Robertson. In this capacity, McLaughlin relieved brigadier general Foster C. LaHue and simultaneously served as commander of Task Force X Ray in the area of Phu Bai Combat Base.

At the end of May 1968, McLaughlin was relieved by Brigadier General George D. Webster and was transferred to Saigon, where he was appointed deputy chief of staff for operations on the staff of Military Assistance Command, Vietnam under General Creighton Abrams. He succeeded Brigadier General John R. Chaisson in that capacity and was responsible for the planning of the military operations until August 1969. For his service in Vietnam, McLaughlin received the Navy Distinguished Service Medal and several Vietnamese decorations.

Upon his return to the United States, McLaughlin was promoted to the rank of major general on September 3, 1969, and appointed commanding general of Marine Corps Recruit Depot San Diego, California. In this capacity, he was responsible for the training of new recruits, which served as replacements for Marine units overseas and stateside.

During the beginning of March 1973, McLaughlin assumed command of the 4th Marine Division at Camp Pendleton, which served as the main ground force of the Marine Corps Reserve. Following one year of service in that capacity, McLaughlin was nominated for promotion to the rank of lieutenant general and subsequently promoted on September 1, 1974. His new assignment was in the capacity of Chief of Staff, Headquarters Marine Corps under General Robert E. Cushman. In this administrative position, McLaughlin proved great skills and received his third Legion of Merit.

His final assignment came at the beginning of August 1975, when he assumed duties as commanding general, Fleet Marine Force Pacific with headquarters in Hawaii. He held this largest field command of the Marine Corps until July 1, 1977, when he retired from active service after 36 years. At his retirement ceremony, McLaughlin was decorated with his second Navy Distinguished Service Medal.

== Retirement ==
Following his retirement, McLaughlin settled in Savannah, Georgia, with his wife Marilee Hicks McLaughlin. He was active in the Marine Corps Historical Foundation, where he received a Certificate of Appreciation by then-Commandant Robert H. Barrow for his contributions to the Oral History Program.

Upon the death of his first wife, he married again and spent the rest of his life with Andrea Adams McLaughlin. McLaughlin struggled with cancer and finally died due to a heart attack on August 8, 2002. He is buried at Beaufort National Cemetery, South Carolina.

His old friend from the prison camp, Lieutenant General William G. Thrash said:

"General McLaughlin was the best friend I ever had. He was a tower of strength in the camp," said Thrash. "He helped me run the camp. I could not have made it without him. Great leaders are born not made. He was a humble man, but a brilliant man and one of the outstanding officers of the Corps. He leaves a wonderful legacy for all Marines to emulate."

== Decorations ==
Here is the ribbon bar of Lieutenant General John N. McLaughlin:

1st Row	Navy Distinguished Service Medal with one 5/16" Gold Star		Silver Star	
2nd Row	Legion of Merit with two 5/16" Gold Stars	Bronze Star Medal with Combat "V"	Joint Service Commendation Medal	Prisoner of War Medal
3rd Row	Navy Presidential Unit Citation with two stars	American Defense Service Medal	American Campaign Medal	Asiatic-Pacific Campaign Medal with one 3/16 inch silver service star
4th Row	World War II Victory Medal	Navy Occupation Service Medal	National Defense Service Medal with one star	Korean Service Medal with three 3/16 inch service stars
5th Row	Vietnam Service Medal with one silver and one bronze 3/16 inch service stars	National Order of Vietnam, Grade of Knight	Vietnam Gallantry Cross with Palm	Vietnam Naval Service Medal
6th Row	Vietnam Gallantry Cross unit citation	Republic of Korea Presidential Unit Citation	United Nations Korea Medal	Vietnam Campaign Medal

== See also ==
- Battle of Chosin Reservoir

Military offices
Preceded by Thomas H. Miller	Commanding General of the Fleet Marine Force Pacific; August 1, 1975 – July 1, 1977	Succeeded by Leslie E. Brown
Preceded by Foster C. LaHue	Chief of Staff, Headquarters Marine Corps; September 1, 1974 – July 30, 1975	Succeeded by Leslie E. Brown
Preceded by Leo J. Dulacki	Commanding General of the 4th Marine Division; March 5, 1973 – August 9, 1974	Succeeded by Paul X. Kelley
Preceded by Lowell E. English	Commanding General of Marine Corps Recruit Depot San Diego; September 3, 1969 – February 28, 1973	Succeeded by Joseph C. Fegan Jr.
