= Foster C. LaHue =

U.S. Marine Corps Lieutenant General

Foster Carr LaHue
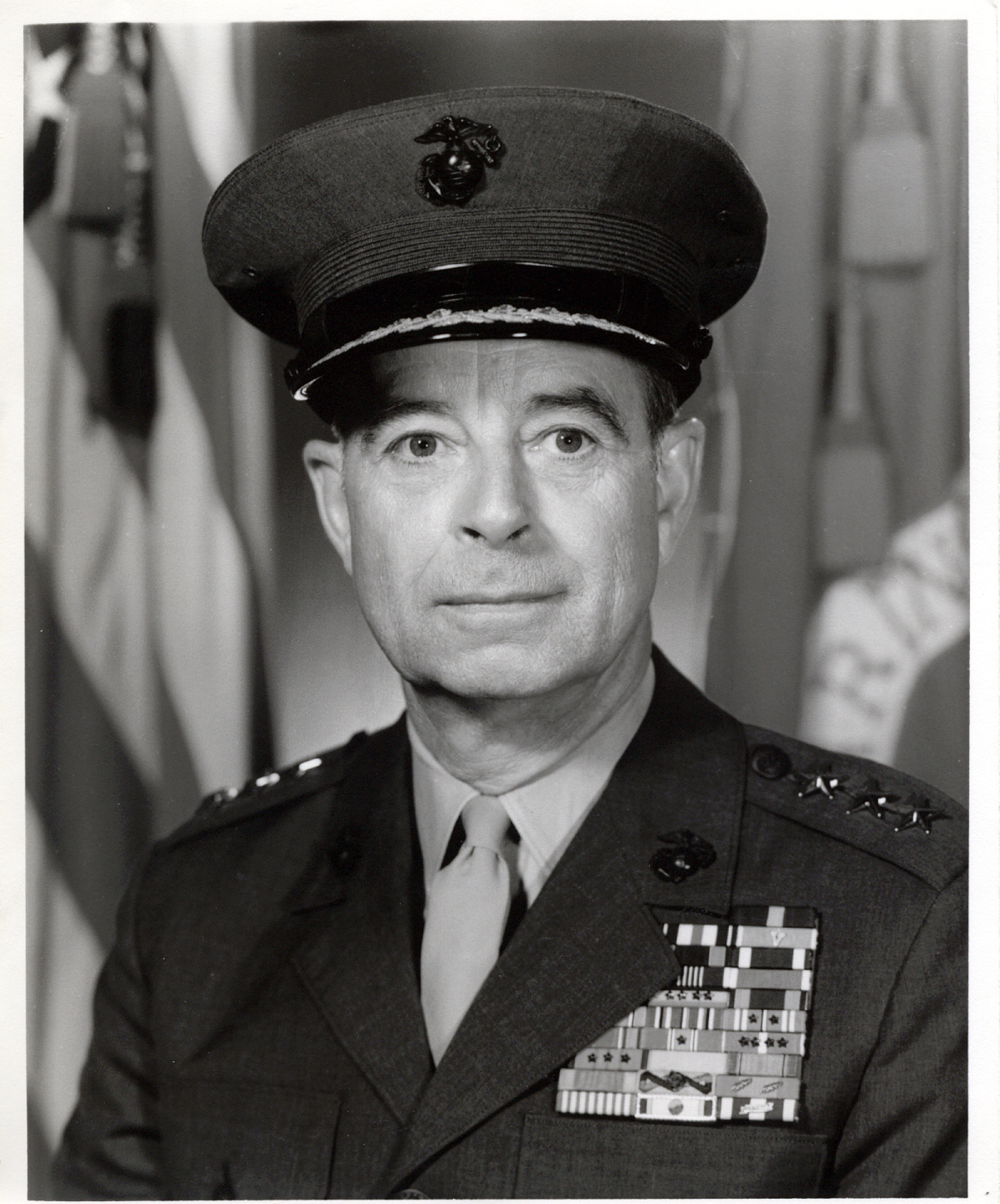
- Lieutenant General Foster C. LaHue, USMC
- Born: 2 September 1917; Corydon, Indiana, U.S.
- Died: 12 February 1996 (aged 78); Ormond Beach, Florida, U.S.
- Military career
- Allegiance: United States of America
- Branch: United States Marine Corps
- Service years: 1941–1974
- Rank: Lieutenant general
- Nickname: "Frosty"
- Service number: 0-7721
- Commands: Chief of Staff, HQMC; Force Troops, FMFLANT; Task Force X-Ray; 3rd Battalion, 1st Marines; 2nd Battalion, 4th Marines
- Conflicts: World War II; New Georgia Campaign; Admiralty Islands Campaign; Korean War; Battle of Chosin Reservoir; Battle of the Punchbowl; Vietnam War; Battle of Huế
- Awards: Distinguished Service Medal (2); Silver Star; Legion of Merit; Purple Heart; Air Medal; Commendation Medal (2)

Foster Carr LaHue (2 September 1917 – 12 February 1996) was a lieutenant general in the United States Marine Corps. He saw combat in World War II, the Korean War and the Vietnam War. During the Vietnam War, he commanded Task Force X-Ray which was involved in the heaviest fighting at the Battle of Huế.

== Early life and education ==
LaHue graduated from Corydon High School and subsequently attended DePauw University where he graduated in 1939.

== Career ==
LaHue completed Officer Candidates School at Marine Corps Base Quantico, Virginia, in May 1941 and was commissioned as a Marine Second lieutenant.

=== World War II ===
LaHue served as a platoon commander, company commander, and battalion staff officer with the First and Fourth Raider Battalions, participating in the New Georgia Campaign and in the Admiralty Islands campaign in the Pacific Theatre.

=== Korean War ===
LaHue deployed to Korea in November 1950, serving as the Division Adjutant in the 1st Marine Division. From June to November 1951, he commanded the 3rd Battalion, 1st Marines, during this time, he was awarded the Silver Star and the Legion of Merit.

=== Vietnam War ===
From March 1967 until April 1968, LaHue served with the 1st Marine Division in the Republic of Vietnam.

On 9 August 1967, the 1st Marine Division commander, MG Donn J. Robertson reactivated Task Force X-Ray with his Assistant Division Commander Brigadier general LaHue given command. Task Force X-Ray comprised the 1st Battalion, 5th Marines, 3rd Battalion, 5th Marines and the Battalion Landing Team 1st Battalion, 3rd Marines. BG LaHue then launched Operation Cochise against the People's Army of Vietnam (PAVN) 2nd Division in the Quế Sơn Valley. At the conclusion of the operation on 28 August 156 PAVN had been killed and 13 captured for the loss of 10 Marines.

On 4 December 1967, BG LaHue was again given command of Task Force X-Ray to implement Operation Checkers, the movement of the 1st Marine Division from Thừa Thiên Province north to Quảng Trị Province. On 11 January 1968 Task Force X-Ray headquarters was established at Phu Bai Combat Base and assumed operational control of the 5th Marine Regiment which moved north from Da Nang and the 1st Marine Regiment already based at Phu Bai.

In the early morning of 31 January 1968 as part of the Tet Offensive, the PAVN and Vietcong (VC) seized control of the city of Huế from the Army of the Republic of Vietnam (ARVN) 1st Division. The Marines at Phu Bai were called on to support the ARVN 1st Division and US forces at the Military Assistance Command Vietnam (MACV) compound in the new city on the south side of the river. LaHue would later write that "the initial deployment of forces was made with limited information." On 1 February BG LaHue ordered Colonel Gravel's 1st Battalion, 1st Marines to move 6 blocks west from the MACV Compound and recapture the Thừa Thiên provincial headquarters and prison. In a press interview he stated that "Very definitely, we control the south side of the city... I don't think they have any resupply capability, and once they've used up what they brought in, they're finished." As with other commanders LaHue still did not appreciate the strength of the PAVN/VC forces in the city or their open supply lines; the Marines would not capture the provincial headquarters and prison until 6 February. On 9 February once the new city of Huế had been largely secured by the Marines, BG LaHue ordered the 1/5 Marines to move into the Old City to support the ARVN in retaking the Citadel. In his briefing of 1/5 Marines commander Major Robert Thompson, LaHue expressed his view that it would only take a few days to clear the Citadel. On 16 February at a meeting with LaHue and deputy COMUSMACV General Creighton Abrams, South Vietnamese Prime Minister Nguyễn Cao Kỳ approved the use of all necessary force to clear the PAVN and VC forces from the Citadel. The following day the 1st Brigade, 101st Airborne Division was placed under the operational control of Task Force X-Ray and tasked with blocking PAVN/VC lines of retreat to the south and southwest of the city. Operation Hue City formally concluded on 2 March 1968 and BG LaHue redeployed his units in line with the original Operation Checkers plan and relinquished control of Army units temporarily assigned to his command.

On 14 March, BG LaHue launched Operation Ford on the Phu Thu Peninsula east of Phu Bai. The 2nd Battalion, 3rd Marines and the 1st Battalion, 1st Marines swept the area engaging the VC 804th Main Force Battalion. At the conclusion of the operation on 20 March 145 VC had been killed and 5 captured for the loss of 14 Marines.

On 7 April, BG LaHue was relieved as commander of Task Force X-Ray and returned to Da Nang, where he was replaced as assistant division commander of the 1st Marine Division on 14 April.

== Later career ==
LaHue was promoted to major general in August 1969. He was promoted to lieutenant general on 1 August 1972, and served as chief of staff until his retirement on 1 September 1974

== Decorations ==
Here is the ribbon bar of Lieutenant General Foster C. LaHue:

1st Row	Navy Distinguished Service Medal with one 5/16" Gold Star	Silver Star	Legion of Merit with Combat "V"
2nd Row	Air Medal	Navy Commendation Medal	Army Commendation Medal
3rd Row	Purple Heart	Navy Presidential Unit Citation with four stars	Navy Unit Commendation
4th Row	American Defense Service Medal	American Campaign Medal	Asiatic-Pacific Campaign Medal with two 3/16 inch service stars
5th Row	World War II Victory Medal	National Defense Service Medal with one star	Korean Service Medal with four 3/16 inch service stars
6th Row	Vietnam Service Medal with three 3/16 inch service stars	Marine Corps Reserve Ribbon	Order of the White Elephant, Commander
7th Row	National Order of Vietnam, Knight	Vietnam Army Distinguished Service Order, 1st Class	Vietnam Gallantry Cross with Palm
8th Row	United Nations Korea Medal	Republic of Korea Presidential Unit Citation	Vietnam Campaign Medal

Military offices
Preceded by John R. Chaisson	Chief of Staff, Headquarters Marine Corps; August 1, 1972 - September 1, 1974	Succeeded by John N. McLaughlin
