= Operation Allen Brook =

1968 US Marine operation of the Vietnam War

- Part of the Vietnam War
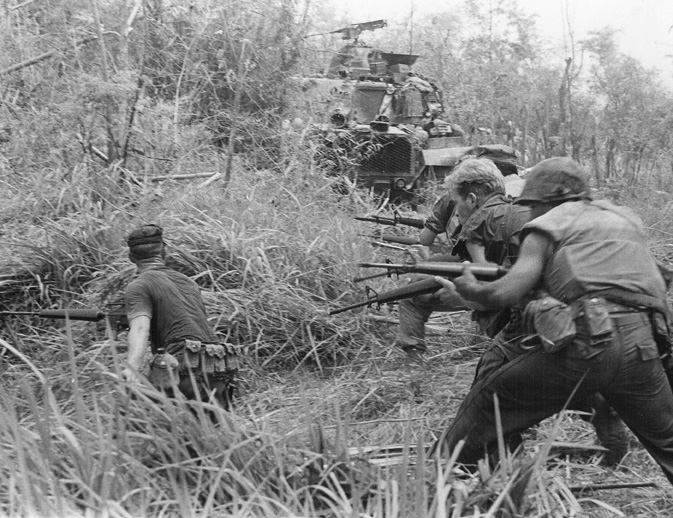
- 2/7 Marines in action on 7 May 1968
Date	4 May – 24 August 1968
Location	Go Noi Island, Quảng Nam Province, South Vietnam 15.85°N 108.2°E
Result	US victory PAVN/VC forces driven from Go Noi Island and "Dodge City"

Belligerents
United States	Viet Cong; North Vietnam

Commanders and leaders
(United States) Donn J. Robertson	(North Vietnam) Vương Thừa Vũ

Units involved
1st Marine Division: 3rd Battalion 5th Marines; 7th Marine Regiment; 1st Battalion 26th Marines; 27th Marine Regiment	(Vietnam) 308th Division: 36th Regiment; R-20 Battalion; V-25 Battalion; T-3 Sapper Battalion

Casualties and losses
172 killed	US body count: 917 killed 11 captured

Operation Allen Brook was a US Marine Corps operation that took place south of Da Nang, lasting from 4 May to 24 August 1968.

== Background ==
Go Noi Island was located approximately 25 km south of Danang to the west of Highway 1. Together with the area directly north of the island, nicknamed Dodge City by the Marines due to frequent ambushes and firefights there, it was a Vietcong (VC) and People's Army of Vietnam (PAVN) stronghold and base area. While the island was relatively flat, the small hamlets on the island were linked by hedges and concealed paths providing a strong defensive network. Go Noi was the base for the VC's Group 44 headquarters for Quảng Nam Province, the R-20 and V-25 Battalions and the T-3 Sapper Battalion and, it was believed, elements of the PAVN 2nd Division. The 3rd Battalion 7th Marines had conducted Operation Jasper Square on the island during April with minimal results. At the beginning of May the 1st Marine Division headquarters ordered a new operation on Go Noi.

== Operation ==
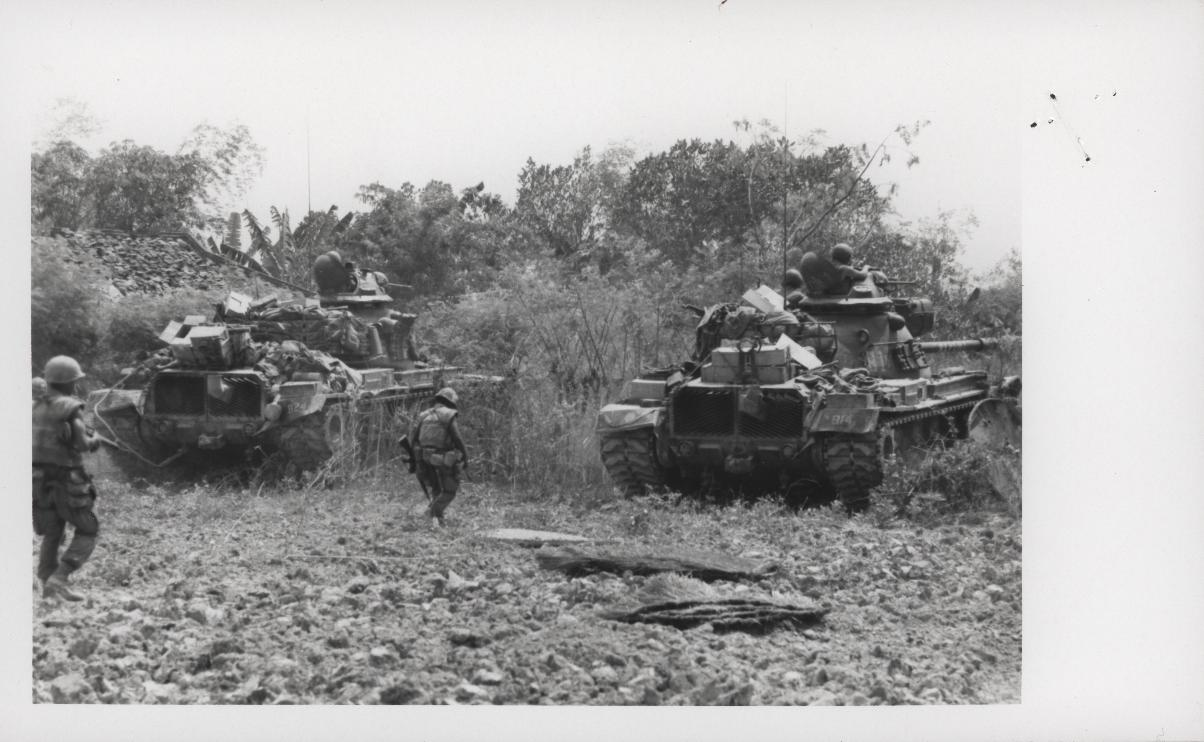
M48s of Company B, 5th Tank Battalion accompany Company E, 2/7 Marines on a sweep of Go Noi Island

On the morning of 4 May 1968 two companies of the 2nd Battalion 7th Marines supported by tanks crossed the Liberty Bridge (15.841°N 108.121°E) onto the island meeting only light resistance for the first few days. On 7 May Company A 1st Battalion 7th Marines relieved one company from 2/7 Marines and Company K 3/7 Marines was added to the operation. By 8 May the Marines had lost nine killed and 57 wounded and the VC 88 killed. On the evening of 9 May the Marines encountered heavy resistance at the hamlet of Xuan Dai (2). After calling in air strikes the Marines overran the hamlet resulting in 80 PAVN killed.

On 13 May Company I 3rd Battalion 27th Marines was deployed to the Quế Sơn mountains southwest of Go Noi moving east onto the island. The Marines on the island began sweeping west with the elements linking up at the Liberty Bridge on 15 May. Company E 2/7 Marines and the command group were airlifted out of the area on the evening of 15 May.

The Marines then began a deception plan crossing the Liberty Bridge as if the operation had concluded and then crossing back onto the island on the early morning of 16 May. At 09:00 on 16 May 3/7 Marines encountered a PAVN battalion at the hamlet of Phu Dong (2) (15.862°N 108.21°E). The Marines were unable to outflank the PAVN and called in air and artillery support as the battle continued. By nightfall the PAVN abandoned their positions, leaving more than 130 dead while Marine losses were 25 dead and 38 wounded. The hamlet was found to contain a PAVN regimental headquarters and vast quantities of supplies.

On the morning of 17 May 3/7 Marines moved out of Phu Dong (2) patrolling southeast. Company I, 3/27 Marines was leading the column when it was ambushed by a strongly entrenched PAVN force near the hamlet of Le Nam (1) (15.854°N 108.21°E). The other Marine companies attempted to assist Company I, but the PAVN defenses proved too strong and artillery support was the only way to relieve the pressure on Company I. It was decided that Companies K and L 3/27 Marines would air assault into the area. The first helicopters landed at 15:00 and Company K broke through to relieve Company I at 19:30 while the PAVN withdrew. Marine losses were 39 dead and 105 wounded while PAVN losses were 81 killed. PFC Robert C. Burke a machine-gunner in Company I would be posthumously awarded the Medal of Honor for his actions during the battle.

On 18 May 3rd Battalion 5th Marines replaced 3/7 Marines and operational control passed to 3/27 Marines. At 09:30 the Marines began taking sniper fire from the hamlet of Le Bac (2)(15.858°N 108.21°E). Companies K and L were sent to clear out the snipers but were quickly pinned down by another well-prepared PAVN ambush. Airstrikes and artillery fire were called in but due to the proximity of the opposing forces were of limited effect. At 15:00 Company M, 3/27 Marines arrived by helicopter to replace Company L and cover the retreat of Company K and air and artillery strikes were directed against Le Bac (2). Marine losses were 15 killed, 35 wounded with over 90 cases of heat exhaustion while PAVN losses were 20 killed.

For the next six days the Marines continued patrolling, suffering frequent ambushes despite strong preparatory fires. The Marines altered their tactics so that when the enemy was encountered they would hold their positions or pull back to allow air and artillery to deal with the entrenched forces. From 24–7 May a sustained fight took place at the hamlet of Le Bac (1), only ending when torrential rain made further fighting impossible. By the end of May total casualties for the battle were 138 Marines killed and 686 wounded while PAVN/VC losses exceeded 600 killed.

Intelligence later determined the PAVN force encountered by the Marines was the 36th Regiment, 308th Division which had only recently arrived in South Vietnam and that they were probably deployed in preparation for an attack on Danang as part of the "mini-Tet" or May Offensive. Operation Allen Brook prevented any such attack and mini-Tet in Danang was marked only by increased rocket attacks on the base areas.

On 26 May the 1st Battalion 26th Marines reinforced the operation, while on the 28th 3/27 Marines was relieved by 1st Battalion 27th Marines and 3/5 Marines was returned to the Division reserve. During early June the 1/26 and 1/27 Marines carried out ongoing search and clear operations on the island encountering regular ambushes by small PAVN/Vietcong forces.

On 5 June as the Marine Battalions moved west along the island they were ambushed by a PAVN force at the hamlet of Cu Ban (3). Due to the proximity of the enemy forces supporting fire was ineffective and a confused close-quarters battle raged throughout the day until tanks arrived and the Marines overran the enemy positions. Marines losses were seven killed and 55 wounded while PAVN losses were 30 killed.

On 6 June 1/26 Marines was withdrawn from the operation and elements of the 1st Engineer Battalion arrived with orders to destroy the fortifications on Go Noi with 1/27 Marines providing security. On the early morning of 15 June a PAVN force attacked Company B 1/17 Marines' night defensive position, the attack was defeated with 21 PAVN killed for no Marine losses.

On 19 June Companies B and D were ambushed by the PAVN at the hamlet of Bac Dong Ban. The fight lasted nine hours before the Marines were able to overrun the PAVN bunkers. Marine losses were six killed and 19 wounded while the PAVN lost 17 killed.

On 23 June 2nd Battalion 27th Marines relieved 1/27 Marines on Go Noi. 2/27 Marines stayed on Go Noi until 16 July when it was relieved by 3/27 Marines. Marine losses during this period were four Marines killed and 177 wounded for 144 PAVN/Vietcong killed.

On 31 July, BLT 2/7 Marines which had just completed Operation Swift Play in the Da The mountains 6 km south of Go Noi arrived on the island and relieved 3/27 Marines.

Land clearing operations on Go Noi continued into August by which time much of the island had been completely levelled and seeded with herbicides. As enemy activity had been reduced to a minimal level it was decided to close the operation. While much of their infrastructure had been destroyed the PAVN/VC continued to resist until the last as the Marines and Engineers withdrew across the Liberty Bridge harassed by sniper fire.

== Aftermath ==
Operation Allen Brook concluded on 24 August, the Marines had suffered 172 dead and 1124 wounded while claiming the PAVN/VC suffered 917 killed and 11 captured.
